= List of exoplanets observed during Kepler's K2 mission =

This is a list of exoplanets observed during the Kepler space telescope's K2 mission.

On 31 March 2022, K2-2016-BLG-0005Lb was reported to be the most distant exoplanet found by Kepler to date.

== List ==
Table keys
Planet type
Planet discovered prior to K2 mission
Additional non transiting planet discovered during radial velocity follow up
Potentially habitable planet
None of the above

Planet	Discovery method	Mass (M_{J})	Radius (R_{J})	Density (g/cm^{3})	Equilibrium Temperature (K)	Orbital period (days)	Semimajor axis (AU)	Orbital eccentricity	Properties of the parent star					Year of discovery	Ref.
Planet	Discovery method	Mass (M_{J})	Radius (R_{J})	Density (g/cm^{3})	Equilibrium Temperature (K)	Orbital period (days)	Semimajor axis (AU)	Orbital eccentricity	App. mag.	Distance (ly)	Spectral type	Host star mass (M_{☉})	Host star temp. (K)	Year of discovery	Ref.
Earth (for reference)		0.00315	0.0892	5.515	255	365.2563	1	0.0167	−26.74	0	G2 V	1	5772	—	
WASP-28b (K2-1b)	Transit	0.907	1.213	0.676	1468	3.4088300	0.04469		12.03	1,300	F8	1.021	6150	2014	
HIP 116454 b (K2-2b)	Transit	0.037	0.226	4.17	690	9.1205	0.0906	0.205	10.190	180	K1	1.021	6150	2014	
K2-3b	Transit	0.0255	0.194	4.5	463	10.05449	0.0769		12.17		M0 V	0.60	3896	2015	
K2-3c	Transit	0.0066	0.165	1.82	344	24.64354	0.1399		12.17		M0 V	0.60	3896	2015	
K2-3d	Transit	0.0236	0.135	11.7	282	44.55983	0.2076	0.045	12.17		M0 V	0.60	3896	2015	
K2-4b	Transit		0.187		563	10.003417	0.078		14.907			0.63	4014	2015	
K2-5b	Transit		0.170		565	5.73594	0.0532		14.91		K7.5 V	0.61	3930	2015	
K2-5c	Transit		0.202		456	10.93241	0.0818		14.91		K7.5 V	0.61	3930	2015	
K2-6b	Transit		0.223		615	30.94191	0.1898		12.654			0.970	5850	2015	
K2-7b	Transit		0.238		651	28.67992	0.1814		13.213			0.970	5772	2015	
K2-8b	Transit		0.319		631	10.35239	0.0856		14.61		K3 V	0.78	4870	2015	
K2-8c	Transit		0.215		801	5.06416	0.0532		14.61		K3 V	0.78	4870	2015	
K2-9b	Transit		0.201		314	18.4498	0.0910		15.63		M2.5 V	0.30	3390	2015	
K2-10b	Transit	0.085	0.343	2.6	703	19.3044	0.1370	0.31	12.418			0.92	5620	2015	
K2-11b	Transit		0.6736		734	39.93767	0.2257		13.386			1.35	5433	2015	
K2-12b	Transit		0.208		1003	8.28212	0.0802		12.258			1.01	5800	2015	
K2-13b	Transit		0.169		511	39.91488	0.2114		12.901			0.80	5698	2015	
K2-14b	Transit		0.429		488	8.36802	0.0627	0.14	16.310			0.47	3789	2015	
K2-15b	Transit		0.221		676	11.81040	0.0910		14.663			0.72	5131	2015	
K2-16b	Transit		0.180		658	7.61880	0.0667		14.67		K3 V	0.68	4742	2015	
K2-16c	Transit		0.227		485	19.07863	0.1229		14.67		K3 V	0.68	4742	2015	
K2-17b	Transit		0.199		487	17.96753	0.1190		13.519			0.71	4320	2015	
K2-18b	Transit	0.0250	0.212	3.3	235	32.93963	0.143	<0.43	13.496	110	M2.5 V	0.359	3457	2015	
K2-18c	Radial velocity	0.0236			363	8.962	0.060	<0.47	13.496	110	M2.5 V	0.359	3457	2017	
K2-19b	Transit	0.0897	0.691	0.334	854	7.91940	0.0740		13.00		G9 V	0.93	5430	2015	
K2-19c	Transit	0.0805	0.434	1.18	745	11.90715	0.0971		13.00		G9 V	0.93	5430	2015	
K2-19d	Transit		0.102		1252	2.50856	0.0344		13.00		G9 V	0.93	5430	2016	
HAT-P-56b (K2-20b)	Transit	2.18	1.466	0.86	1840	2.7908327	0.04230	<0.246	10.908		F8	1.296	6566	2015	
K2-21b	Transit		0.164		500	9.325038	0.076		12.85		M0.0	0.68	4222	2015	
K2-21c	Transit		0.222		420	15.501920	0.107		12.85		M0.0	0.68	4222	2015	
K2-22b	Transit	<1.4	<0.22		2100	0.381078	0.0088		15.597		M0 V	0.60	3830	2015	
WASP-47b (K2-23b)	Transit	1.13	1.139	0.940	1275	4.1591409	0.051	<0.026	11.986	200		1.11	5576	2012	
WASP-47c (K2-23c)	Radial velocity	≥1.24			247	572	1.36	0.13	11.986	200		1.11	5576	2015	
WASP-47d (K2-23d)	Transit	0.0327	0.321	1.2		9.03079	0.0850		11.986	200		1.11	5576	2015	
WASP-47e (K2-23e)	Transit	0.0384	0.1621	11.2		0.789518	0.01673		11.986	200		1.11	5576	2015	
K2-24b	Transit	0.0661	0.507	0.63	709	20.88508	0.1542		11.07		G9 V	1.12	5743	2016	
K2-24c	Transit	0.0850	0.698	0.31	606	42.36342	0.2471		11.07		G9 V	1.12	5743	2016	
K2-25b	Transit		0.306			3.484552			15.881		M4.5	0.294	3180	2015	
K2-26b	Transit		0.238		430	14.5665	0.09620		14.53		M1.0 V	0.56	3785	2016	
K2-27b	Transit	0.0972	0.400	1.87	902	6.771315	0.06702	0.251	12.64			0.866	5248	2016	
K2-28b	Transit		0.207		568	2.260455	0.0214		16.061		M4	0.257	3214	2016	
WASP-152b (K2-29b)	Transit	0.73	1.19	0.53	1171	3.2588321	0.04217	0.066	12.526		G7 V	0.94	5358	2016	
K2-30b	Transit	0.579	1.039	0.640	1092	4.098503	0.04839	<0.08	13.530		G6 V	0.900	5425	2016	
K2-31b	Transit	1.774	1.06			1.257850	0.0220		10.775		G7 V	0.91	5280	2016	
K2-32b	Transit	0.0519	0.458	0.67	817	8.99213	0.08036		12.31		G9 V	0.856	5275	2016	
K2-32c	Transit	<0.0381	0.269	<2.7	619	20.6602	0.1399		12.31		G9 V	0.856	5275	2016	
K2-32d	Transit	0.0324	0.306	1.38	537	31.7154	0.1862		12.31		G9 V	0.856	5275	2016	
K2-33b	Transit	<3.7	0.450		850	5.424865	0.0409		15.714		M3.3	0.56	3540	2016	
K2-34b	Transit	1.773	1.44	0.800	1715	2.995610	0.0465	<0.022	11.548		F9 V	0.640	6132	2016	
K2-35b	Transit		0.172		979	5.608352	0.055		14.35		K4 V	0.70	4402	2016	
K2-35c	Transit		0.118			2.399964	0.031		14.35		K4 V	0.70	4402	2016	
K2-36b	Transit		0.118		1232	1.42266	0.0230		11.80		K2 V	0.80	4924	2016	
K2-36c	Transit		0.250		793	5.34059	0.0555		11.80		K2 V	0.80	4924	2016	
K2-37b	Transit		0.144		974	4.44117	0.0511		12.52		G3 V	0.90	5413	2016	
K2-37c	Transit		0.245		861	6.42904	0.0654		12.52		G3 V	0.90	5413	2016	
K2-37d	Transit		0.244		663	14.09189	0.1103		12.52		G3 V	0.90	5413	2016	
K2-38b	Transit	0.0378	0.138	17.5	1184	4.01593	0.0506		11.39	631	G2 V	2.24	5757	2016	
K2-38c	Transit	0.0311	0.216	3.6	858	10.56103	0.0964		11.39		G2 V	2.24	5757	2016	
K2-39b	Transit	0.125	0.509	1.17	1356	4.60497	0.0574	0.152	10.83			0.660	4881	2016	
WASP-75b (K2-40b)	Transit	1.07	1.270	0.69		2.484193	0.0375	<0.056	11.45	260	F9	1.14	6100	2013	
WASP-157b (K2-41b)	Transit	0.576	0.998		~1190	3.951623	0.0499	0.0	12.9	1100	G2 V	1.06	5772	2016	
K2-42b	Transit		0.192			6.68796	0.0617			1309		0.7	4613	2016	
K2-43b	Transit		0.402			3.471149	0,0.201		15.6	600	K7 V	0.57	3841	2016	
K2-43c	Transit		0.216			2.198884	0.0148		15.6	600	K7 V	0.57	3841	2019	
BD+20 594b (K2-56b)	Transit	0.016	0.199	5.91	613	41.68547	0.2226	0	10.849	580	G2 V	0.847	5748	2016	
K2-58b	Transit		0.231			7.052475	0.0692		12.415	593	K2 V	0.857	5134	2016	
K2-58c	Transit		0.0185			2.537071	0.0350		12.415	593	K2 V	0.857	5134	2016	
K2-58d	Transit		0.0199			22.881590	0.1517		12.415	593	K2 V	0.857	5134	2016	
K2-66b	Transit	0.0503	0.245	3.0	1427	5.06939	0.05983		11.710	1,670		1.06	5865	2016	
K2-72b	Transit		0.0964			5.577212	0.040		15.370	49.0		0.31	3498	2016	
K2-72c	Transit		0.103			15.189034	0.078		15.370	49.0		0.31	3498	2016	
K2-72d	Transit		0.0901			7.760178	0.050		15.370	49.0		0.31	3498	2016	
K2-72e	Transit		0.115			24.158868	0.106		15.370	49.0		0.31	3498	2016	
K2-80d	Transit		0.228			28.8673	0.1778			658.7				2018	
HD 3167 b (K2-96b)	Transit	0.01524	0.1428	6.49	1781	0.95965451	0.01814		8.97	154.2		0.864	5338	2016	
HD 3167 c (K2-96c)	Transit	0.035900	0.2661	2.36	567	29.846511	0.1794	0.040	8.97	154.2		0.864	5338	2016	
HD 3167 d (K2-96d)	Radial Velocity	>0.01430			865	8.3967	0.0770	0.35	8.97	154.2		0.864	5338	2017	
HD 3167 e (K2-96e)	Radial Velocity	>0.0308			389	91.90	0.3797	0.128	8.97	154.2		0.864	5338	2022	
K2-111b	Transit	0.0271	0.17							680		0.89	5730	2017	
K2-111c	Radial velocity	0.0356				15.6785	0.1166			680		0.89	5730	2020	
GJ 9827 b (K2-135b)	Transit	0.0135	0.128	7.858	1035	1.208974	0.0189		10.37	109.9	K7 V	0.62	4236	2017	
GJ 9827 c (K2-135c)	Transit	0.00585	0.101	7.142	715	3.648103	0.0395		10.37	109.9	K7 V	0.62	4236	2017	
GJ 9827 d (K2-135d)	Transit	0.00950	0.177	2.51	675	6.201830	0.053		10.37	109.9	K7 V	0.62	4236	2017	
K2-136b	Transit	<0.014	0.09046	<24	610	7.97525	0.0707	0.14	11.101	55.0	K5 V	0.742	4500	2017	
K2-136c	Transit	0.0569	0.268	3.69	470	17.30723	0.1185	0.0470	11.101	55.0	K5 V	0.742	4500	2017	
K2-136d	Transit	<0.0094	0.1396	<4.3	420	25.5750	0.1538	0.0710	11.101	55.0	K5 V	0.742	4500	2017	
K2-137b	Transit	<0.5	0.079		1471	0.179715	0.0058		15.94	32.9	M3 V	0.463	3492	2017	
K2-138b	Transit								12.21	597	K1 V	0.93	5378	2018	
K2-138c	Transit								12.21	597	K1 V	0.93	5378	2018	
K2-138d	Transit								12.21	597	K1 V	0.93	5378	2018	
K2-138e	Transit								12.21	597	K1 V	0.93	5378	2018	
K2-138f	Transit								12.21	597	K1 V	0.93	5378	2018	
K2-138g	Transit		0.249?			41.97			12.21	597	K1 V	0.93	5378	2018	
K2-141b	Transit													2018	
HATS-36b (K2-145b)	Transit	2.79	1.235	2.12	1356	4.17524	0.0529	14.386			G0 V			2017	
K2-146b	Transit													2018	
K2-147b	Transit		0.123			0.961917	0.0159			296.1				2018	
K2-148b	Transit				674									2018	
K2-155d	Transit	0.015	0.146		289	40.6835	0.1937	low		200				2018	
K2-187b	Transit					0.773981	0.016322		12.864	1090	G	0.966999	5477	2018	
K2-187c	Transit					2.871788	0.0391185		12.864	1090	G	0.966999	5477	2018	
K2-187d	Transit					7.149079	0.0718533		12.864	1090	G	0.966999	5477	2018	
K2-187e	Transit					13.608341	0.11036		12.864	1090	G	0.966999	5477	2018	
K2-229b	Transit													2018	
K2-236b	Transit													2017	
K2-239b	Transit								14.549	101.5	M3 V	0.4	3420	2018	
K2-239c	Transit	0.0028	0.089		427	7.775	0.0576		14.549	101.5	M3 V	0.4	3420	2018	
K2-239d	Transit				399				14.549	101.5	M3 V	0.4	3420	2018	
K2-288Bb	Transit		0.17		226.36	31.393463	0.164					0.33		2019	
K2-315b	Transit		0.085		460	3.1443189	0.0234		17.67	185	M3.5 V	0.174	3300	2020	
