= List of exoplanets discovered in 2018 =

This List of exoplanets discovered in 2018 is a list of confirmed exoplanets that were first observed during 2018.

For exoplanets detected only by radial velocity, the listed value for mass is a lower limit. See Minimum mass for more information.

Name	Mass (M_{J})	Radius (R_{J})	Period (days)	Semi-major axis (AU)	Temp. (K)	Discovery method	Distance (ly)	Host star mass (M_{☉})	Host star temp. (K)	Remarks
24 Boötis b	0.91^{+0.13}_{−0.10}		30.3506^{+0.0078}_{−0.0077}	0.190^{+0.012}_{−0.009}		radial vel.	313.9±2.1	0.99^{+0.19}_{−0.13}	4893±15	
COROT-20c	17±1		1675^{+19}_{−17}	2.90±0.07		radial vel.	2819±80	1.14±0.08	6050±200	Brown dwarf (possibly)
DE Canum Venaticorum b	12±3		4098.1±131.5	5.75±2.02		timing	99.64±0.09	0.51		
Gamma Librae b	1.02±0.14		415.2^{+1.8}_{−1.9}	1.24±0.10		radial vel.	154.7±2.9	1.47±0.20	4822±15	
Gamma Librae c	4.58^{+0.45}_{−0.43}		964.6±3.1	2.17±0.10		radial vel.	154.7±2.9	1.47±0.20	4822±15	
Gliese 15 Ac	0.11		7600	5.4		radial vel.	11.6	0.38	3567	
Gliese 96 b	0.06186^{+0.00761}_{−0.00724}		73.94^{+0.33}_{−0.38}	0.291±0.005		radial vel.	38.929±0.0302	0.60±0.07	3785±62	
Gliese 143 b	0.09637^{+0.00827}_{−0.00840}	0.228±0.028	35.589^{+0.006}_{−0.005}	0.1932±0.0002		transit	53.25±0.02	0.76^{+0.03}_{−0.02}		
Gliese 1132 c	0.00831±0.00138		8.929±0.010	0.0476±0.0017	300±5	radial vel.	41.153±0.023	0.181±0.019	3270±140	
Gliese 1265 b	0.023±0.002		3.6511±0.0012	0.026±0.001		radial vel.	33.45±0.02	0.18±0.02	3236±51	Host star also known as LP 819-052
Gliese 3779 b	0.025±0.002		3.0232±0.0013	0.026±0.001		radial vel.	44.84±0.04	0.27±0.02	3324±51	Host star also known as Ross 1020
HAT-P-11c	1.60^{+0.09}_{−0.08}		3407^{+360}_{−190}	4.13^{+0.29}_{−0.16}		radial vel.	123.31±0.11	0.809^{+0.020}_{−0.030}	4780±50	
HATS-39b	0.63±0.13	1.57±0.12	4.5776348	0.06007±0.00058	1645±43	transit	2910±240	1.379±0.040	6572±83	
HATS-40b	1.59±0.24	1.58^{+0.16}_{−0.12}	3.2642736	0.04997±0.00074	2101±69	transit	4550±110	1.561±0.069	6460±130	
HATS-41b	9.7±1.6	1.33^{+0.29}_{−0.20}	4.193649	0.0583^{+0.0015}_{−0.0010}	1710^{+170}_{−120}	transit	2457±47	1.496^{+0.115}_{−0.078}	6424±91	
HATS-42b	1.88±0.15	1.40^{+0.25}_{−0.14}	2.2921020	0.03689±0.00065	1856^{+105}_{−75}	transit	2672±35	1.273±0.067	6060±120	
HATS-54b	0.753±0.057	1.015±0.024	2.5441765±0.0000024	0.0370±0.001	1429±24	transit	2350±30	1.05±0.05	5621±70	Host star also known as NGTS-22
HATS-55b	0.921	1.251	4.2042001	0.05412	1367	transit	2034	1.20	6214	
HATS-56b	0.602	1.688	4.324799	0.06043	1902	transit	1882	1.57	6536	
HATS-57b	3.147	1.139	2.3506210	0.03493	1413.4	transit	913	1.03	5587	
HATS-58Ab	1.03	1.095	4.2180896	0.05798	1721	transit	1605	1.46	7175	
HATS-59b	0.806±0.069	1.126±0.077	5.416081±0.000016	0.06112±0.00076	1128±40	transit	2140±50	1.04±0.04	5670±91	
HATS-59c	12.70±0.87		1422±14	2.504±0.035	175.9±6.4	radial vel.	2140±50	1.04±0.04	5670±91	
HATS-60b	0.662±0.055	1.153±0.053	3.560829±0.000032	0.04708^{+0.00015}_{−0.00023}	1528±11	transit	1609±28	1.097^{+0.010}_{−0.016}	5688±20	
HATS-61b	3.40±0.14	1.195±0.067	7.817953±0.000024	0.07908±0.00033	1226.1±7.3	transit	2262±29	1.08±0.01	5542±21	
HATS-62b	0.179^{+0}_{−0.179}	1.055±0.025	3.2768837±0.0000033	0.04163^{+0.00024}_{−0.00016}	1237±12	transit	1731±34	0.90^{+0.02}_{−0.01}	5416^{+19}_{−13}	
HATS-63b	0.960±0.120	1.207±0.039	3.0566527±0.0000049	0.04026±0.00028	1398.3±9.0	transit	2070±20	0.93±0.02	5627±18	
HATS-64b	0.960±0.200	1.679±0.081	4.908897±0.000013	0.06562±0.00039	1793±27	transit	3640±140	1.56±0.03	6554±27	
HATS-65b	0.821±0.083	1.501±0.050	3.1051610±0.0000016	0.04497±0.00033	1634±18	transit	1631±41	1.26±0.03	6277±30	
HATS-66b	5.33±0.68	1.411±0.084	3.1414391±0.0000074	0.04714±0.00025	1998±21	transit	5040±130	1.41±0.02	6625±35	
HATS-67b	1.45±0.12	1.685±0.047	1.6091788±0.0000040	0.03032±0.00015	2193±22	transit	3219±80	1.44±0.02	6594±33	
HATS-68b	1.290±0.059	1.232^{+0.039}_{−0.029}	3.5862202±0.0000047	0.05071±0.00018	1741±12	transit	2004±34	1.35±0.01	6147±22	
HATS-69b	0.577^{+0}_{−0.577}	0.945±0.022	2.2252577±0.0000019	0.03211^{+0.00014}_{−0.00019}	1295.7±6.9	transit	1368±11.7	0.89^{+0.01}_{−-0.02}	5137±16	
HATS-70b	12.9^{+1.8}_{−1.6}	1.384^{+0.079}_{−0.074}	1.8882378±0.0000015	0.03632^{+0.00074}_{−0.00087}	2730^{+140}_{−160}	transit	4263^{+196}_{−202}	0.81^{+0.50}_{−0.33}	1.08^{+0.16}_{−0.14}	
HD 1397 b	0.415±0.020	1.026^{+0.025}_{−0.027}	11.53533^{+0.00079}_{−0.00080}	0.1097^{+0.0011}_{−0.0013}	1228.3^{+10.0}_{−9.9}	transit	260.121	1.324^{+0.042}_{−0.046}	5521±60	
HD 2685 b	1.17±0.12	1.44±0.05	4.12688^{+0.00005}_{−0.00004}	0.0568±0.0006	2061±28	transit	645.72^{+2.77}_{−2.28}	1.43^{+0.05}_{−0.04}	6801±76	
HD 4917 b	1.615±0.092	1.224	400.5±1.7	1.167±0.065		radial vel.	670.1±8.1	1.32	4802	Two additional planets in system are suspected
HD 13167 b	3.31±0.16	1.167	2613±17	4.10±0.34		radial vel.	487.8±3.5	1.35	5671	
HD 14787 b	1.121±0.069	1.250	676.6±8.1	1.70±0.19		radial vel.	389.9±2.5	1.43	4946	
HD 18015 b	3.18±0.23	1.170	2278±71	3.87±0.32		radial vel.	405.2±2.6	1.49	5603	
HD 23472 b	0.05638^{+0.00444}_{−0.04405}	0.179±0.009	17.667^{+0.142}_{−0.095}	0.121±0.001	543±18	transit	127.48±0.06	0.67±0.03	4684±99	
HD 23472 c	0.05405^{+0.00337}_{−0.04333}	0.167±0.010	29.625^{+0.224}_{−0.171}	0.170±0.001	467^{+19}_{−18}	transit	127.48±0.06	0.67±0.03	4684±99	
HD 33142 c	5.97^{+1.04}_{−0.80}		834^{+29}_{−24}			radial vel.	37.34±0.18	1.78±0.31	5009±15	Marginal detection
HD 55696 b	3.87±0.72		1827±10	3.18±0.18		radial vel.	255±1	1.29±0.20	6012	
HD 72490 b	1.768±0.080	1.218	858±12	1.88±0.21		radial vel.	413.5±3.6	1.21	4934	
HD 72490 c	4.5±1.2		3878±261	5.22±0.58		radial vel.	224±20	1.26±0.25	4867	
HD 89345 b	0.110	0.660	11.81430	0.1066	1089	transit	433.1	1.16	5576	Host star also known as K2-234
HD 94834 b	1.26±0.17	1.242	1576±76	2.74±0.18		radial vel.	321.0±2.1	1.11	4798	
HD 98736 b	2.33±0.78		968.8±2.2	1.864±0.091		radial vel.	106±0.2	0.92±0.13	5271	
HD 125390 b	22.16		1756.2	3.16		radial vel.	503	1.36	4850	
HD 148164 b	1.23±0.25		328.55±0.41	0.9930±0.0660		radial vel.	252±1.0	1.21±0.24	6032	
HD 148164 c	5.16±0.82		5062±114	6.15±0.50		radial vel.	252±1.0	1.21±0.24	6032	
HD 158996 b	14.0±2.3		820.2±14.0	2.1±0.2		radial vel.	933±15	1.8±0.3	4069±30	
HD 180053 b	2.194±0.064	1.203	213.72±0.47	0.843±0.063		radial vel.	448.7±2.0	1.75	5131	
HD 180617 b	0.03839^{+0.00315}_{−0.0044}		105.9^{+0.09}_{−0.1}	0.3357^{+0.0099}_{−0.01}		radial vel.	19.28±0.07	0.45±0.04	3557±51	Planetary orbit partly in habitable zone
HD 202772 Ab	1.017^{+0.070}_{−0.068}	1.545^{+0.052}_{−0.060}	3.308958±0.000083	0.05208^{+0.00064}_{−0.00068}	2132^{+28}_{−30}	transit	480.1^{+8.2}_{−7.8}	1.72^{+0.06}_{−0.07}	6272^{+77}_{−71}	
HD 203473 b	7.8±1.1		1552.9±3.4	2.73±0.17		radial vel.	237±1.0	1.12±0.21	5780	
HD 211810 b	0.670±0.440		1558±22	2.656±0.043		radial vel.	211±0.4	1.03±0.02	5652	
HD 215152 b	0.0057^{+0.0016}_{−0.0020}		5.7600^{+0.0016}_{−0.0018}	0.05764^{+0.00074}_{−0.00076}		radial vel.	70.48±0.16	0.770±0.015	4935±76	
HD 215152 e	0.0091^{+0.0033}_{−0.0047}		25.197^{+0.048}_{−0.051}	0.1542±0.0020		radial vel.	70.48±0.16	0.770±0.015	4935±76	
HD 219666 b	0.0552±0.0041	0.4202±0.0152	6.03607±0.00064	0.06356±0.00265	1073±20	transit	307.89±0.98	0.92±0.03	5527±65	Host star also known as TOI-118
HD 220197 b	0.20		1728	2.729		radial vel.	210	0.91	5683	
HD 233832 b	1.78		2058	2.827		radial vel.	192	0.71	4981	
HD 238914 b	6.0		4100	5.7		radial vel.	982	1.47	4769	
K2-80d		0.228^{+0.025}_{−0.012}	28.8673^{+0.0051}_{−0.0046}	0.1778^{+0.0051}_{−0.0055}		transit	658.7±5.7	0.90±0.08	5441±249	
K2-138b		0.140	2.35322	0.03380		transit	597	0.93	5378	
K2-138c		0.225	3.55987	0.04454		transit	597	0.93	5378	
K2-138d		0.237	5.40478	0.05883		transit	597	0.93	5378	
K2-138e		0.294	8.26144	0.07807		transit	597	0.93	5378	
K2-138f		0.251	12.75759	0.10430		transit	597	0.93	5378	
K2-141c	0.023^{+0}_{−0.023}	0.624^{+0.410}_{−0.250}	7.74850	0.06739^{+0.00089}_{−0.00091}		transit	202.16±0.54	0.708±0.028	4599±79	
K2-155b	0.015^{+0.002}_{−0.001}	0.138^{+0.018}_{−0.015}	6.34365	0.0546^{+0.0013}_{−0.0014}	708^{+38}_{−31}	transit	237.94±0.93	0.65^{+0.06}_{−0.03}	4258±150	
K2-155c	0.020^{+0.005}_{−0.002}	0.174^{+0.024}_{−0.020}	13.85402	0.0946^{+0.0031}_{−0.0030}	583^{+52}_{−35}	transit	237.94±0.93	0.65^{+0.06}_{−0.03}	4258±150	
K2-155d	0.015^{+0.005}_{−0.002}	0.146^{+0.016}_{−0.015}	40.6835±0.0031	0.1937^{+0.0064}_{−0.0059}	381^{+47}_{−25}	transit	237.94±0.93	0.65^{+0.06}_{−0.03}	4258±150	
K2-156b		0.103^{+0.009}_{−0.006}	0.813149	0.0149±0.0001	1347^{+18}_{−19}	transit	492.0±3.5	0.66^{+0.02}_{−0.01}	4597±50	
K2-157b		0.094	0.365257			transit		0.94	5456	
K2-158b		0.236^{+0.014}_{−0.009}	10.0605^{+0.0013}_{−0.0015}	0.0887±0.0008	794±11	transit	647.1±6.7	0.92^{+0.03}_{−0.02}	5503^{+51}_{−48}	
K2-158c		0.114^{+0.012}_{−0.009}	5.9028^{+0.0019}_{−0.0023}	0.0622±0.0006	948±13	transit	647.1±6.7	0.92^{+0.03}_{−0.02}	5503^{+51}_{−48}	
K2-159b		0.202^{+0.015}_{−0.010}	12.4221±0.0018	0.1013^{+0.0008}_{−0.0009}	684±8	transit	560.4±4.6	0.90^{+0.02}_{−0.03}	5425±44	
K2-160b		0.284^{+0.019}_{−0.013}	3.705871	0.04660^{+0.00037}_{−0.00041}		transit	1038±15	0.983^{+0.023}_{−0.025}	5649±50	
K2-161b		0.546^{+0.146}_{−0.070}	9.283188	0.0861^{+0.0018}_{−0.0023}		transit	3070±160	0.987^{+0.082}_{−0.060}	4972±50	
K2-162b		0.128^{+0.010}_{−0.006}	9.4589^{+0.0010}_{−0.0011}	0.0795±0.0006	631±8	transit	407.3±2.0	0.75±0.02	4842^{+49}_{−45}	
K2-163b		0.220^{+0.023}_{−0.011}	6.673117	0.06509^{+0.00050}_{−0.00060}		transit	684±14	0.826^{+0.019}_{−0.023}	4937±50	
K2-164b		0.290^{+0.046}_{−0.037}	17.3551^{+0.0041}_{−0.0038}	0.1387^{+0.0036}_{−0.0025}		transit	1238±25	1.181^{+0.093}_{−0.061}	5791±50	
K2-165b		0.1137^{+0.0129}_{−0.0087}	2.35499	0.03262±0.00040		transit	440.6±3.9	0.835^{+0.031}_{−0.030}	5185±50	
K2-165c		0.1386^{+0.0187}_{−0.0098}	4.38275	0.04935±0.00061		transit	440.6±3.9	0.835^{+0.031}_{−0.030}	5185±50	
K2-165d		0.236^{+0.023}_{−0.013}	14.1014±0.0011	0.1076±0.0013		transit	440.6±3.9	0.835^{+0.031}_{−0.030}	5185±50	
K2-166b		0.195^{+0.018}_{−0.017}	8.5272±0.0020	0.08583^{+0.00123}_{−0.00076}		transit	1577±32	1.16^{+0.05}_{−0.03}	5960^{+52}_{−53}	
K2-167b		0.252^{+0.046}_{−0.040}	9.9775±0.0010	0.0912^{+0.0036}_{−0.0029}		transit	264.5±1.5	1.02^{+0.12}_{−0.09}	5908±50	
K2-168b		0.191^{+0.018}_{−0.012}	15.8540±0.0014	0.1195^{+0.0013}_{−0.0014}		transit	801±14	0.907^{+0.029}_{−0.032}	5554±50	
K2-169b		0.1136^{+0.0096}_{−0.0069}	6.38080	0.06764^{+0.00063}_{−0.00061}		transit	774±15	0.986^{+0.028}_{−0.026}	5548±50	
K2-170b		0.127^{+0.018}_{−0.012}	7.5765^{+0.0018}_{−0.0017}	0.07457^{+0.00083}_{−0.00086}		transit	1296±21	0.964±0.032	5748±50	
K2-170c		0.161^{+0.022}_{−0.014}	12.4000^{+0.0017}_{−0.0019}	0.1036^{+0.0011}_{−0.0012}		transit	1296±21	0.964±0.032	5748±50	
K2-171b		0.240^{+0.036}_{−0.030}	5.6285^{+0.0017}_{−0.0015}	0.05960^{+0.00132}_{−0.00062}		transit	2010±61	0.892^{+0.060}_{−0.027}	5250±50	
K2-172b		0.1486^{+0.014}_{−0.0085}	14.3169±0.0014	0.1128^{+0.0010}_{−0.0011}		transit	820.3±9.6	0.934^{+0.026}_{−0.027}	5569±50	
K2-172c		0.286^{+0.017}_{−0.012}	29.6268±0.0016	0.1832^{+0.0017}_{−0.0018}		transit	820.3±9.6	0.934^{+0.026}_{−0.027}	5569±50	
K2-173b		0.1435^{+0.0143}_{−0.0094}	5.86870	0.06105^{+0.00078}_{−0.00085}}		transit	750.6±6.4	0.881^{+0.034}_{−0.036}	5580±70	
K2-174b		0.2223^{+0.0157}_{−0.0087}	19.56274	0.1242±0.0013		transit	326.9±1.2	0.668^{+0.022}_{−0.021}	4500±50	
K2-175b		0.182^{+0.032}_{−0.024}	9.5260^{+0.0012}_{−0.0013}	0.0906^{+0.0016}_{−0.0011}		transit	812.2±9.1	1.095^{+0.057}_{−0.039}	5909±50	
K2-176b		0.1330^{+0.0110}_{−0.0083}	5.32944	0.05846^{+0.00042}_{−0.00052}		transit	812±12	0.939^{+0.020}_{−0.025}	5428±50	
K2-177b		0.189^{+0.025}_{−0.014}	14.1552^{+0.0032}_{−0.0030}	0.1221^{+0.0011}_{−0.0013}		transit	1628±42	1.211^{+0.032}_{−0.038}	6063±50	
K2-178b		0.317^{+0.018}_{−0.012}	8.74782	0.08171^{+0.00066}_{−0.00081}		transit	704.7±6.0	0.951^{+0.023}_{−0.027}	5525±50	
K2-179b		0.224^{+0.015}_{−0.011}	5.17219	0.05488^{+0.00048}_{−0.00060}		transit	625.7±6.9	0.824^{+0.022}_{−0.027}	5015±50	
K2-180b		0.2150^{+0.0184}_{−0.0098}	8.86593	0.07550^{+0.00070}_{−0.00075}		transit	668.9±5.7	0.730^{+0.020}_{−0.022}	5263±50	
K2-181b		0.241^{+0.028}_{−0.016}	6.89425	0.07191^{+0.00055}_{−0.00067}		transit	1189±17	1.044^{+0.024}_{−0.029}	5609±50	
K2-182b	0.063±0.016	0.2469^{+0.0152}_{−0.0089}	4.736884	0.05223^{+0.00048}_{−0.00064}		transit	507.2±4.1	0.847^{+0.024}_{−0.031}	5159±50	Confirmed in 2021.
K2-183b		0.098±0.090	0.469269	0.011586^{+0.00010}_{−0.000087}		transit	1083±14	0.942^{+0.021}_{−0.025}	5482±50	
K2-183c		0.224^{+0.024}_{−0.012}	10.79347	0.09371^{+0.00070}_{−0.00083}		transit	1083±14	0.942^{+0.021}_{−0.025}	5482±50	
K2-183d		0.227^{+0.025}_{−0.013}	22.6295^{+0.0018}_{−0.0019}	0.1535^{+0.0014}_{−0.0012}		transit	1083±14	0.942^{+0.021}_{−0.025}	5482±50	
K2-184b		0.1372^{+0.0134}_{−0.0080}	16.99344	0.1210^{+0.0014}_{−0.0015}		transit	247.1±1.1	0.819^{+0.028}_{−0.030}	5252±50	
K2-185b		0.117^{+0.020}_{−0.010}	10.6166^{+0.0016}_{−0.0018}	0.09378^{+0.00088}_{−0.00093}		transit	882±11	0.976^{+0.027}_{−0.028}	5722±50	
K2-186b		0.283^{+0.024}_{−0.015}	41.4742^{+0.0033}_{−0.0043}	0.2359^{+0.0018}_{−0.0021}		transit	1089±18	1.019^{+0.023}_{−0.027}	5784±50	
K2-187b		0.123	0.773981			transit		0.97	5477	
K2-187c		0.152^{+0.022}_{−0.010}	2.87179	0.03910^{+0.00034}_{−0.00033}		transit	1089±19	0.967^{+0.025}_{−0.024}	5477±50	
K2-187d		0.287^{+0.045}_{−0.022}	7.14908	0.07182^{+0.00062}_{−0.00061}		transit	1089±19	0.967^{+0.025}_{−0.024}	5477±50	
K2-187e		0.201^{+0.019}_{−0.012}	13.6083^{+0.0017}_{−0.0016}	0.11031^{+0.00096}_{−0.00094}		transit	1089±19	0.967^{+0.025}_{−0.024}	5477±50	
K2-188b		0.112^{+0.015}_{−0.010}	1.74298	0.02932^{+0.000276}_{−0.000225}		transit	1476±28	1.107^{+0.031}_{−0.025}	5982±50	
K2-188c		0.234^{+0.028}_{−0.016}	7.80760	0.07967^{+0.00075}_{−0.00061}		transit	1476±28	1.107^{+0.031}_{−0.025}	5982±50	
K2-189b		0.1349^{+0.0136}_{−0.0085}	5.17630	0.05711^{+0.00049}_{−0.00057}		transit	795.2±6.3	0.928^{+0.024}_{−0.027}	5503±50	
K2-189c		0.222^{+0.028}_{−0.012}	6.67934	0.06769^{+0.00058}_{−0.00068}		transit	795.2±6.3	0.928^{+0.024}_{−0.027}	5503±50	
K2-190b		0.1210^{+0.0157}_{−0.0091}	10.09886	0.0884^{+0.0011}_{−0.0012}		transit	526.5±3.7	0.905^{+0.033}_{−0.036}	5631±50	
K2-190c		0.0975^{+0.0135}_{−0.0082}	21.5740^{+0.0057}_{−0.0043}	0.1467^{+0.0018}_{−0.0020}		transit	526.5±3.7	0.905^{+0.033}_{−0.036}	5631±50	
K2-191b		{{0.141^{+0.024}_{−0.012}	2.85865	0.03807^{+0.00036}_{−0.00040}		transit	944.5±7.8	0.901^{+0.026}_{−0.028}	5176±50	
K2-192b		0.1405^{+0.0135}_{−0.0099}	4.16322	0.04840^{+0.00045}_{−0.00058}		transit	727.9±5.9	0.873^{+0.024}_{−0.031}	5252±50	
K2-193b		0.358^{+0.031}_{−0.018}	14.78721	0.1177±0.0011		transit	1360±12	0.994^{+0.029}_{−0.027}	5623±50	Low fidelity
K2-194b		0.325^{+0.055}_{−0.045}	39.7214^{+0.0057}_{−0.0056}	0.2359^{+0.0032}_{−0.0025}		transit	2090±61	1.110^{+0.046}_{−0.035}	5979±52	
K2-195b		0.262^{+0.018}_{−0.012}	15.85354	0.1220^{+0.0012}_{−0.0014}		transit	1037±14	0.963^{+0.028}_{−0.031}	5712±50	
K2-195c		0.230^{+0.024}_{−0.013}	28.4828^{+0.0064}_{−0.0073}	0.1803^{+0.0018}_{−0.0020}		transit	1037±14	0.963^{+0.028}_{−0.031}	5712±50	
K2-196b		0.321^{+0.054}_{−0.045}	48.3242^{+0.0085}_{−0.0087}	0.2730^{+0.0058}_{−0.0036}		transit	1938±73	1.162^{+0.075}_{−0.045}	6045±50	
K2-197b		0.223^{+0.017}_{−0.010}	8.35795	0.07992^{+0.00068}_{−0.00080}		transit	813.4±7.8	0.975^{+0.025}_{−0.029}	5675±50	Low fidelity
K2-198b		0.367^{+0.023}_{−0.015}	17.04318	0.1221±0.0014		transit	361.7±2.8	0.836±0.029	5262±50	
K2-199b	0.022±0.006	0.1679^{+0.0167}_{−0.0079}	3.225423	0.03804^{+0.00043}_{−0.00042}		transit	351.8±2.0	0.706^{+0.024}_{−0.023}	4681±50	
K2-199c	0.039±0.007	0.253^{+0.015}_{−0.010}	7.37450	0.06601^{+0.00075}_{−0.00074}		transit	351.8±2.0	0.706^{+0.024}_{−0.023}	4681±50	
K2-200b		0.1217^{+0.0128}_{−0.0094}	2.84988	0.03741^{+0.00033}_{−0.00040}		transit	603.7±6.1	0.860^{+0.023}_{−0.027}	5233±50	
K2-201b		0.1249^{+0.0120}_{−0.0069}	1.059790	0.02004^{+0.00014}_{−0.00015}		transit	649.2±5.4	0.956^{+0.020}_{−0.021}	5507±50	
K2-201c		0.293^{+0.036}_{−0.016}	22.7799^{+0.0020}_{−0.0019}	0.1549^{+0.0011}_{−0.0012}		transit	649.2±5.4	0.956^{+0.020}_{−0.021}	5507±50	
K2-202b		0.205^{+0.016}_{−0.011}	3.40516	0.04387^{+0.00044}_{−0.00042}		transit	988.2±8.7	0.971^{+0.030}_{−0.028}	5491±58	
K2-203b		0.122^{+0.025}_{−0.011}	9.6951±0.0013	0.08238^{+0.00112}_{−0.00098}		transit	544.5±5.1	0.794^{+0.033}_{−0.028}	5000±50	
K2-204b		0.272^{+0.039}_{−0.033}	7.05578	0.07222^{+0.00074}_{−0.00066}		transit	1914±58	1.009^{+0.031}_{−0.027}	5755±50	
K2-205b		0.178^{+0.024}_{−0.021}	26.6723^{+0.0042}_{−0.0037}	0.1718^{+0.0023}_{−0.0022}		transit	1337±30	0.951^{+0.038}_{−0.036}	5890±50	
K2-206b		0.249^{+0.020}_{−0.014}	18.2945^{+0.0017}_{−0.0016}	0.1256^{+0.0016}_{−0.0015}		transit	803±10	0.789^{+0.030}_{−0.028}	5043±50	
K2-207b		0.232^{+0.033}_{−0.019}	12.4875±0.0012	0.1033±0.0010		transit	1196±18	0.942±0.028	5522±50	
K2-208b		0.150^{+0.015}_{−0.011}	4.19095	0.04957^{+0.00053}_{−0.00054}		transit	844±10	0.925±0.030	5582±50	
K2-209b		0.0775^{+0.0094}_{−0.0056}	2.08062	0.02891^{+0.00033}_{−0.00032}		transit	250.05±0.99	0.745^{+0.026}_{−0.024}	4720±50	
K2-210b		0.0730^{+0.0090}_{−0.0062}	0.570233	0.01305^{+0.00011}_{−0.00014}		transit	578.6±6.0	0.912^{+0.023}_{−0.029}	5396±50	
K2-211b		0.1226^{+0.0154}_{−0.0091}	0.669558	0.01436^{+0.00011}_{−0.00015}		transit	895±14	0.882^{+0.019}_{−0.027}	5221±50	Another planet discovered in 2020
K2-212b		0.2135^{+0.0127}_{−0.0082}	9.79540	0.07648^{+0.00082}_{−0.00075}		transit	357.3±3.0	0.622^{+0.020}_{−0.018}	4349±50	
K2-213b		0.135^{+0.027}_{−0.019}	8.1309±0.0018	0.08093^{+0.00138}_{−0.00099}		transit	1285±23	1.070^{+0.055}_{−0.038}	5794±50	
K2-214b		0.198^{+0.034}_{−0.023}	8.59653	0.08273^{+0.00083}_{−0.00076}		transit	989±14	1.022^{+0.031}_{−0.028}	5768±50	
K2-215b		0.189^{+0.023}_{−0.014}	8.26965	0.08003^{+0.00070}_{−0.00073}		transit	1333±21	1.000^{+0.026}_{−0.027}	5704±50	
K2-216b		0.1497^{+0.0090}_{−0.0068}	2.174789	0.02916^{+0.00031}_{−0.00032}		transit	377.8±2.3	0.699±0.023	4591±50	
K2-217b		0.319^{+0.062}_{−0.043}	14.07452	0.1179^{+0.0016}_{−0.0013}		transit	1259±25	1.103^{+0.046}_{−0.037}	5967±50	
K2-218b		0.229^{+0.025}_{−0.014}	8.67989	0.08395^{+0.00082}_{−0.00075}		transit	1299±32	1.048^{+0.031}_{−0.028}	5757±50	
K2-219b		0.120^{+0.018}_{−0.016}	3.90129}}	0.04885^{+0.00054}_{−0.00048}		transit	1071±16	1.022^{+0.034}_{−0.030}	5753±50	
K2-219c		0.128^{+0.019}_{−0.017}	6.6677^{+0.0013}_{−0.0016}	0.06982^{+0.00077}_{−0.00070}		transit	1071±16	1.022^{+0.034}_{−0.030}	5753±50	
K2-219d		0.230^{+0.032}_{−0.029}	11.13728	0.09830^{+0.00108}_{−0.00097}		transit	1071±16	1.022^{+0.034}_{−0.030}	5753±50	
K2-220b		0.198^{+0.023}_{−0.013}	13.68251	0.11043^{+0.00099}_{−0.00112}		transit	766.7±8.9	0.960^{+0.026}_{−0.029}	5599±50	
K2-221b		0.1498^{+0.0149}_{−0.0085}	2.39909	0.03520^{+0.00028}_{−0.00029}		transit	1049±22	1.011^{+0.024}_{−0.025}	5716±50	
K2-222b	0.0252±0.0057	0.210±0.007	15.38883	0.1190^{+0.0016}_{−0.0015}		transit	331.4±2.0	0.950^{+0.040}_{−0.036}	5934±50	
K2-223b		0.0812^{+0.0088}_{−0.0066}	0.505570	0.012664^{+0.000080}_{−0.000081}		transit	651.3±8.3	1.06±0.02	5835^{+38}_{−40}	
K2-223c		0.144^{+0.010}_{−0.006}	4.56417	0.05491±0.00035		transit	651.3±8.3	1.06±0.02	5835^{+38}_{−40}	
K2-224b		0.139^{+0.014}_{−0.012}	4.47859	0.05422^{+0.00034}_{−0.00035}	1002±11	transit	904.8±9.6	0.91±0.02	5620^{+42}_{−45}	
K2-224c		0.215^{+0.014}_{−0.011}	10.0949^{+0.0012}_{−0.0011}	0.08858^{+0.00065}_{−0.00066}	764±9	transit	904.8±9.6	0.91±0.02	5620^{+42}_{−45}	
K2-225b		0.311^{+0.023}_{−0.018}	15.8715^{+0.0017}_{−0.0021}	0.13385^{+0.00140}_{−0.00072}	902±13	transit	1179±19	1.27^{+0.02}_{−0.04}	5742^{+49}_{−47}	
K2-226b		0.137^{+0.012}_{−0.008}	3.27111	0.04133^{+0.00047}_{−0.00048}	1120±16	transit	693±11	0.88±0.03	5424^{+48}_{−46}	
K2-227b		0.149^{+0.109}_{−0.016}	13.6218^{+0.0032}_{−0.0033}	0.1098^{+0.0011}_{−0.0012}		transit	613.9±6.7	0.951^{+0.028}_{−0.030}	5673±50	
K2-228b		0.108^{+0.009}_{−0.005}	2.69837	0.0338±0.0003	914^{+14}_{−13}	transit	423±13	0.71±0.02	4715^{+48}_{−46}	
K2-229b	0.0082±0.0014	0.102^{+0.005}_{−0.003}	0.584249	0.012888±0.00013	1818^{+14}_{−15}	transit	335.5±3.5	0.87±0.01	5315^{+25}_{−31}	
K2-229c	0.067^{+0}_{−0.067}	0.181^{+0.011}_{−0.005}	8.32801	0.0769±0.0003	750±6	transit	335.5±3.5	0.87±0.01	5315^{+25}_{−31}	
K2-230b		0.175^{+0.016}_{−0.014}	2.86064	0.0409^{+0.0003}_{−0.0002}	1529±22	transit	1791±47	1.11±0.02	5945^{+23}_{−25}	
K2-231b		0.22±0.02	13.8419±0.0014	0.1132±0.0011		transit	1057±14	1.01±0.03	5695±50	
K2-232b	0.398±0.037	1.000^{+0.022}_{−0.020}	11.168459	0.10356^{+0.00081}_{−0.00077}	1001±14	transit	427.9±2.5	1.188^{+0.028}_{−0.026}	6154±60	
K2-233b		0.1247^{+.0055}_{−0.0054}	2.46746	0.03317^{+0.00044}_{−0.00045}	1040^{+28}_{−26}	transit	220.60±0.91	0.800±0.032	4950±100	
K2-233c		0.1191^{+0.0074}_{−0.0069}	7.06142	0.06687	728^{+20}_{−19}	transit	220.60±0.91	0.800±0.032	4950±100	
K2-233d		0.236±0.010	24.3662±0.0021	0.1527^{+0.0020}_{−0.0021}	482^{+14}_{−13}	transit	220.60±0.91	0.800±0.032	4950±100	
K2-236b	0.085^{+0.044}_{−0.040}	0.546±0.009	19.49213	0.148±0.004	886±17	transit	595.7±4.2	1.18^{+0.03}_{−0.04}	6025±100	First exoplanet discovered by scientists based in India.
K2-237b	1.60±0.11	1.65^{+0.07}_{−0.08}	2.18056	0.037±0.002	1884^{+37}_{−36}	transit	1036±23	1.28^{+0.03}_{−0.04}	6257±100	Also called EPIC 229426032 b
K2-238b	0.86^{+0.13}_{−0.12}	1.30^{+0.15}_{−0.14}	3.20466	0.046±	1587^{+75}_{−76}	transit	22000^{+13000}_{−50000}	1.19±0.08	5630±78	Also called EPIC 246067459 b
K2-239b	0.0044±0.0013	0.098±0.009	5.240±0.001	0.0441±0.0008	502^{+22}_{−18}	transit	101.48±0.27	0.40±0.01	3420±18	
K2-239c	0.0028±0.0009	0.089±0.009	7.775±0.001	0.0576±0.0009	427^{+24}_{−19}	transit	101.48±0.27	0.40±0.01	3420±18	
K2-239d	0.0041±0.0013	0.098±0.009	10.115±0.001	0.0685±0.0012	399^{+18}_{−15}	transit	101.48±0.27	0.40±0.01	3420±18	
K2-240b	0.016^{+0.002}_{−0.001}	0.18^{+0.02}_{−0.01}	6.034±0.001	0.0513±0.0009	586^{+24}_{−18}	transit	238.3±1.7	0.58±0.01	3810±17	
K2-240c	0.014^{+0.002}_{−0.001}	0.16^{+0.03}_{−0.01}	20.523±0.001	0.1159±0.0020	389^{+19}_{−17}	transit	238.3±1.7	0.58±0.01	3810±17	
K2-241b		0.227^{+0.016}_{−0.009}	26.8199±0.0025	0.1567^{+0.0007}_{−0.0008}	507±5	transit	489.6±3.5	0.71±0.01	5262^{+43}_{−39}	
K2-242b		0.227^{+0.019}_{−0.017}	6.51389	0.0494±0.0004	416±8	transit	357.4±2.0	0.38±0.01	3459^{+65}_{−38}	
K2-243b		0.194^{+0.012}_{−0.011}	11.5418^{+0.0027}_{−0.0022}	0.1087±0.0014	1035^{+36}_{−35}	transit	877±11	1.29^{+0.04}_{−0.06}	6570^{+269}_{−171}	
K2-243c		0.179^{+0.013}_{−0.012}	24.9460^{+0.0049}_{−0.0056}	0.1817^{+0.0022}_{−0.0024}	801^{+27}_{−28}	transit	877±11	1.29^{+0.04}_{−0.06}	6570^{+269}_{−171}	
K2-244b		0.156^{+0.012}_{−0.009}	21.0688^{+0.0032}_{−0.0033}	0.1418^{+0.0010}_{−0.0011}	638±7	transit	698.6±7.8	0.86±0.02	5677^{+38}_{−39}	
K2-245b		0.387^{+0.017}_{−0.012}	11.89307	0.0959±0.0006	923±14	transit	1507±28	0.83^{+0.02}_{−0.01}	5793^{+66}_{−52}	
K2-246b		0.311^{+0.022}_{−0.019}	5.76918	0.0602±0.0004	977^{+19}_{−18}	transit	2341±89	0.87±0.02	5610^{+32}_{−29}	
K2-247b		0.189^{+0.017}_{−0.014}	2.25021	0.0304±0.0004	979^{+52}_{−51}	transit	848.1±6.7	0.74±0.03	4667^{+305}_{−183}	
K2-247c		0.195^{+0.022}_{−0.021}	6.4942^{+0.0026}_{−0.0025}	0.0615±0.0008	688^{+36}_{−35}	transit	848.1±6.7	0.74±0.03	4667^{+305}_{−183}	
K2-248b		0.229^{+0.018}_{−0.012}	7.1726^{+0.0015}_{−0.0014}	0.0699±0.0010	886^{+19}_{−18}	transit	1341±16	0.88^{+0.04}_{−0.03}	5528^{+97}_{−86}	
K2-249b		0.249^{+0.024}_{−0.020}	12.4090^{+0.0034}_{−0.0028}	0.1151^{+0.0030}_{−0.0031}	1061±66	transit	1726±55	1.32^{+0.09}_{−0.12}	6504^{+329}_{−419}	
K2-250b		0.218^{+0.017}_{−0.013}	4.01457	0.0459±0.0005	958^{+14}_{−13}	transit	1369±21	0.80^{+0.03}_{−0.02}	5172^{+46}_{−44}	
K2-251b		0.210^{+0.023}_{−0.019}	9.3008^{+0.0033}_{−0.0032}	0.0694±0.0005	437±9	transit	481.6±3.4	0.52±0.01	3717^{+85}_{−50}	
K2-252b		0.155^{+0.015}_{−0.011}	13.8151^{+0.0046}_{−0.0045}	0.1041^{+0.0008}_{−0.0007}	639±7	transit	751.3±6.8	0.79^{+0.02}_{−0.01}	5152^{+41}_{−39}	
K2-253b		1.130^{+0.062}_{−0.054}	4.00167	0.0506^{+0.0010}_{−0.0011}	1238^{+57}_{−53}	transit	2933±95	1.08^{+0.05}_{−0.08}	6027^{+221}_{−240}	
K2-254b		0.145^{+0.025}_{−0.021}	4.09639	0.0448±0.0005	791±26	transit	747.8±4.2	0.71^{+0.02}_{−0.03}	4629^{+168}_{−123}	
K2-254c		0.195^{+0.021}_{−0.016}	12.1184^{+0.0030}_{−0.0032}	0.0923±0.0010	551±18	transit	747.8±4.2	0.71^{+0.02}_{−0.03}	4629^{+168}_{−123}	
K2-255b		0.259^{+0.025}_{−0.010}	1.96417	0.0274±0.0003	1034±17	transit	628.4±5.0	0.71±0.03	4676^{+63}_{−61}	
K2-257b		0.074^{+0.005}_{−0.004}	1.60588	0.0216±0.0002	789±14	transit	209.14±0.84	0.52±0.01	3725^{+80}_{−46}	
K2-258b		0.268^{+0.019}_{−0.018}	19.0921^{+0.0058}_{−0.0063}	0.1490^{+0.0025}_{−0.0026}	{831±30	transit	2201±37	1.21^{+0.05}_{−0.08}	6351^{+198}_{−228}	
K2-259b		0.207^{+0.018}_{−0.015}	15.4804^{+0.0033}_{−0.0039}	0.1271^{+0.0010}_{−0.0011}	795±13	transit	1374±27	1.14±0.03	6059^{+62}_{−76}	
K2-260b	1.42^{+0.31}_{−0.32}	1.552^{+0.048}_{−0.057}	2.6266657	0.0404^{+0.0013}_{−0.0016}	1957^{+78}_{−77}	transit	2206±63	1.39^{+0.05}_{−0.06}	6367±250	
K2-261b	0.223±0.031	0.850^{+0.026}_{−0.022}	11.63344	0.102^{+0.019}_{−0.020}	1080^{+110}_{−100}	transit	699.9±6.4	1.10^{+0.01}_{−0.02}	5537±71	
K2-263b	0.0466±0.0098	0.215±0.011	50.818947±0.000094	0.2573±0.0029	470±10	transit	532±4	0.88±0.03	5368±44	
K2-264b		0.203^{+0.018}_{−0.014}	5.839770^{+0.000061}_{−0.000063}		489^{+12}_{−13}	transit	609±7	0.47±0.01	3580±70	
K2-264c		0.247^{+0.018}_{−0.016}	19.663650^{+0.000303}_{−0.000306}		326^{+8}_{−9}	transit	609±7	0.47±0.01	3580±70	
K2-265b	0.0206±0.0026	0.153±0.010	2.369172±0.000089	0.03376±0.00021		transit	454±3	0.912±0.02	5477±27	
K2-266b	0.0356^{+0.0346}_{−0.0205}	0.29^{+0.16}_{−0.12}	0.658524±0.000017	0.01306^{+0.00020}_{−0.00021}	1515±18	transit	251.7^{+1.95}_{−1.92}	0.686±0.033	4285^{+49}_{−57}	
K2-266c	0.00091^{+0.00053}_{−0.00035}	0.0629^{+0.0086}_{−0.0076}	7.8140^{+0.0019}_{−0.0016}	0.0679±0.0011	664.5^{+8.0}_{−7.7}	transit	251.7^{+1.95}_{−1.92}	0.686±0.033	4285^{+49}_{−57}	
K2-266d	0.0296^{+0.0091}_{−0.0063}	0.261^{+0.012}_{−0.011}	14.69700^{+0.00034}_{−0.00035}	0.1035^{+0.0016}_{−0.0017}	538.3^{+6.5}_{−6.3}	transit	251.7^{+1.95}_{−1.92}	0.686±0.033	4285^{+49}_{−57}	
K2-266e	0.0261^{+0.0085}_{−0.0057}	0.244^{+0.012}_{−0.010}	19.4820±0.0012	0.1249^{+0.0019}_{−0.0020}	490.1^{+5.9}_{−5.7}	transit	251.7^{+1.95}_{−1.92}	0.686±0.033	4285^{+49}_{−57}	Two more planets are suspected
K2-267b	3.0^{+1.1}_{−1.2}	1.051±0.044	6.180235±0.000014	0.07229^{+0.00074}_{−0.00075}	1401±16	transit	1098^{+27}_{−26}	1.317^{+0.041}_{−0.040}	6202^{+52}_{−50}	host star also known as EPIC 246851721
K2-268b		0.126±0.012	2.151894^{+0.000393}_{−0.000363}	0.0308±0.0002	1121±14	transit	1081.1±10.27	0.84±0.02	5068±51	
K2-268c		0.240±0.021	9.326841^{+0.001532}_{−0.001617}	0.0819±0.0006	688±8	transit	1081.1±10.27	0.84±0.02	5068±51	
K2-269b		0.140±0.011	4.144965^{+0.000817}_{−0.000619}	0.0531±0.0006	1429±37	transit	1180.1±47.0	1.16±0.04	6209±88	
K2-270b		0.123±0.010	1.543069^{+0.000189}_{−0.000185}	0.0247±0.0002	1203±17	transit	924.75±7.60	0.85±0.02	4877±58	
K2-270c		0.263±0.014	4.400028^{+0.000169}_{−0.000178}	0.0497±0.0004	848±12	transit	924.75±7.60	0.85±0.02	4877±58	
K2-271b		0.649±0.021	8.562421±0.000127	0.0770^{+0.0008}_{−0.0009}	893±17	transit	1863.9±44.32	0.83±0.03	5644±71	
K2-272b		0.260±0.013	14.453533^{+0.001328}_{−0.001360}	0.1081^{+0.0016}_{−0.0017}	655±12	transit	1391.3±17.3	0.81±0.04	5419±79	
K2-273b		0.394±0.114	11.716332^{+0.001172}_{−0.001198}	0.0974±0.0011	672±11	transit	1013.0±9.39	0.90±0.03	5200±67	
K2-274b		0.196±0.011	14.129714^{+0.0021022}_{−0.001876}	0.1064^{+0.0009}_{−0.0008}	589±9	transit	1013.0±9.39	0.81±0.02	5065±60	
K2-275b		0.200±0.011	3.280961^{+0.000112}_{−0.000107}	0.0400±0.0003	905±13	transit	404.73±2.28	0.79±0.02	4812±59	
K2-275c		0.209±0.009	8.438756^{+0.000269}_{−0.000271}	0.0750±0.0005	660±9	transit	404.73±2.28	0.79±0.02	4812±59	
K2-276b		0.336±0.019	18.718269^{+0.003153}_{−0.003008}	0.1291±0.0011	583^{+10}_{−9}	transit	1597.8±23.9	0.82±0.02	5139±62	
K2-277b		0.185±0.011	6.326763^{+0.000355}_{−0.000361}	0.0675±0.0006	958±14	transit	370.29±2.28	1.02±0.03	5741±65	
K2-278b		0.266±0.021	3.334966^{+0.000701}_{−0.000859}	0.0488±0.0009	1711±101	transit	2622.7±53.7	1.40±0.08	6747±383	
K2-279b		0.108±0.012	7.122605^{+0.001647}_{−0.001601}	0.0670^{+0.0008}_{−0.0009}	879±14	transit	599.48±5.15	0.79±0.03	5558±70	
K2-280b		0.684±0.023	19.895202^{+0.000774}_{−0.000753}	0.1488^{+0.0019}_{−0.0020}	744±15	transit	1294.5±2.38	1.11±0.04	5742±90	
K2-281b		0.730±0.019	8.687721^{+0.000151}_{−0.000150}	0.0773±0.0008	665±12	transit	1520.2±23.6	0.82±0.03	4812±72	
K2-282b		0.252±0.012	4.169836^{+0.000279}_{−0.000300}	0.0499^{+0.0006}_{−0.0007}	1057±20	transit	1638.2±25.3	0.95±0.04	5523±82	Two more planets discovered in 2019 and 2020
K2-283b		0.314±0.014	1.921036^{+0.000051}_{−0.000053}	0.0291±0.0003	1186±20	transit	1331.5±15.7	0.89±0.03	5060±70	
K2-284b		0.248^{+0.012}_{−0.011}	4.795069±0.000086	0.04771±0.00025	653^{+16}_{−14}	transit	351.0±1.6	0.63±0.01	4140±50	Very young host star
K2-285b	0.03046^{+0.00381}_{−0.00431}	0.231±0.005	3.471745^{+0.000044}_{−0.000046}	0.03817^{+0.00095}_{−0.00092}	1088.9^{+22.1}_{−21.9}	transit	508±4	0.83±0.02	4975±95	
K2-285c	0.04933^{+0.00717}_{−0.00670}	0.315±0.007	7.138048^{+0.000072}_{−0.000063}	0.0824±0.0018	741.4±14.5	transit	508±4	0.83±0.02	4975±95	
K2-285d	0.020±0.020	0.221±0.005	10.45582^{+0.00025}_{−0.00023}	0.1178±0.0029	619.9^{+12.7}_{−12.5}	transit	508±4	0.83±0.02	4975±95	
K2-285e	0.0337^{+0}_{−0.0337}	0.174±0.004	14.76289^{+0.00065}_{−0.00061}	0.18041^{+0.00420}_{−0.00430}	500.9^{+10.1}_{−9.9}	transit	508±4	0.83±0.02	4975±95	
K2-287b	0.315±0.027	0.847±0.013	14.893291±0.000025	0.1206±0.0008	804^{+8}_{−7}	transit	518.7±4.2	1.06±0.02	5695±58	
K2-292b	0.0771±0.0138	0.235^{+0.010}_{−0.009}	16.9841±0.0008	0.13±0.01	795^{+33}_{−28}	transit	372.76^{+2.67}_{−2.64}	1.00±0.03	5725±65	Host star also known as HD 119130
K2-295b	0.335±0.062	{0.897^{+0.011}_{−0.005}	4.024867±0.000015	0.0451^{+0.0006}_{−0.0014}	852^{+14}_{−6}	transit	736.1±7.8	0.74±0.04	4444±70	
K2-311b	13	1.11±0.07	3650^{+1280}_{−1130}	4.5±1.0	183^{+25}_{−18}	transit	1826.48	0.90±0.09	4898±68	
Kepler-730c		0.140±0.012	2.851883380	0.03997^{+0.00089}_{−0.00069}	1607^{+27}_{−29}	transit	6590^{+254}_{−267}	1.05^{+0.07}_{−0.05}	5620^{+55}_{−59}	
Kepler-1654b		0.819^{+0.019}_{−0.017}	1047.8356^{+0.0018}_{−0.0019}	2.026^{+0.037}_{−0.035}	206.0^{+3.7}_{−3.5}	transit	1884±13	1.011^{+0.056}_{−0.052}	5597^{+95}_{−93}	
Kepler-1655b	0.016^{+0.010}_{−0.009}	0.1974±0.0073	11.87290396	0.103±0.001		transit	699.9±3.2	1.03±0.04	6148±71	Similar to a mini-Neptune
Kepler-1656b	0.153^{+0.013}_{−0.012}	0.448±0.047	31.578659	0.197±0.021	651^{+51}_{−47}	transit	610±3	1.03±0.04	5731±60	Highly eccentric orbit
Kepler-1657b	1.93^{+0.19}_{−0.21}	0.990^{+0.060}_{−0.070}	141.241671±0.000086	0.534^{+0.012}_{−0.030}	347±12	transit	3090±80	1.01^{+0.07}_{−0.16}	5830±100	Also called KOI-3680 b in Exoplanet Archive
KMT-2016-BLG-1397Lb	7.00^{+5.20}_{−4.30}			5.1^{+1.5}_{−1.7}		microlensing	22000^{+3600}_{−4200}	0.45^{+0.33}_{−0.28}		
KMT-2016-BLG-1820Lb	4.57^{+5.03}_{−2.14}			1.08^{+0.22}_{−0.24}		microlensing	20420^{+3720}_{−4170}	0.039^{+0.043}_{−0.018}		
KMT-2016-BLG-2142Lb	15.49^{+24.99}_{−8.58}			0.830^{+0.150}_{−0.200}		microlensing	7010^{+1010}_{−1160}	0.0730^{+0.1170}_{−0.0400}		
KPS-1b	1.090^{+0.086}_{−0.087}	1.03^{+0.13}_{−0.12}	1.706291	0.0269±0.0010	1459±56	transit	863.3±8.5	0.892^{+0.090}_{−0.100}	5165±90	First transiting exoplanet found by an amateur astronomer
LHS 1140 c	0.00569±0.00123	0.1144±0.0021	3.777931±0.000003	0.02675±0.00070	438±9	transit	40.67±1.37	0.18±0.01	3216±39	
MOA-2011-BLG-291Lb	0.057^{+0.107}_{−0.038}			0.69±0.24		microlensing	14000±4600	0.15^{+0.27}_{−0.10}		
MOA-2015-BLG-337Lb	0.1060^{+0.4059}_{−0.0730}			0.24^{+0.06}_{−0.09}		microlensing	23000^{+3600}_{−3300}	0.00940^{+0.03590}_{−0.00650}		
MOA-2016-BLG-319Lb	0.620^{+1.160}_{−0.330}			0.950^{+0.170}_{−0.200}		microlensing	22000^{+3900}_{−4600}	0.15^{+0.28}_{−0.08}		
NGTS-2b	0.74^{+0.13}_{−0.12}	1.595^{+0.047}_{−0.045}	4.511164±0.000061	0.0630^{+0.0024}_{−0.0030}	1468^{+45}_{−42}	transit	1174^{+27}_{−25}	1.64^{+0.19}_{−0.22}	6478^{+94}_{−89}	Also known as WASP-179b
NGTS-3Ab	2.38±0.26	1.48±0.37	1.6753728	0.023^{+0.007}_{−0.005}		transit	2480±36	1.017±0.093	5600±150	
NGTS-4b	0.0648±0.0094	0.284±0.023	1.3373508±0.0000080	0.019±0.005	1650±400	transit	921.7±5.9	0.75±0.02	5143±100	
OGLE-2011-BLG-0173Lb	0.19^{+0.18}_{−0.11}			8		microlensing	20000^{+4200}_{−5500}	0.41^{+0.30}_{−0.21}		Not the planetary candidate OGLE-2017-BLG-0173Lb!
OGLE-2014-BLG-1722Lb	0.17^{+0.16}_{−0.10}		1512^{+3715}_{−1029}	1.9^{+1.3}_{−0.8}		microlensing	20900^{+4200}_{−5900}	0.40^{+0.36}_{−0.24}	3500^{+1490}_{−470}	
OGLE-2014-BLG-1722Lc	0.26^{+0.27}_{−0.16}		2283^{+7021}_{−1589}	2.5^{+2.2}_{−1.1}		microlensing	20900^{+4200}_{−5900}	0.40^{+0.36}_{−0.24}	3500^{+1490}_{−470}	
OGLE-2015-BLG-1670Lb	0.0563^{+0.0302}_{−0.0277}			2.62^{+0.58}_{−0.60}		microlensing	22000^{+3300}_{−4200}	0.55±0.28		
OGLE-2016-BLG-1067Lb	0.43			1.7		microlensing	12165.633	0.3		
OGLE-2017-BLG-0373Lb	0.40^{+0.64}_{−0.26}		2768^{+3343}_{−1704}	2.42^{+0.76}_{−0.78}		microlensing	19200^{+4200}_{−6400}	0.25^{+0.27}_{−0.13}	3250^{+500}_{−300}	
OGLE-2017-BLG-0482Lb	0.0283^{+0.028}_{−0.014}		1972^{+1306}_{−2322}	1.8^{+0.6}_{−0.7}		microlensing	18900^{+5900}_{−6800}	0.20^{+0.20}_{−0.10}	3150^{+350}_{−300}	
OGLE-2017-BLG-1140Lb	1.59^{+0.35}_{−0.26}		819^{+253}_{−218}	1.02±0.15		microlensing	11300	0.211^{+0.032}_{−0.025}	3170^{+60}_{−50}	
OGLE-2017-BLG-1522Lb	0.75^{+1.26}_{−0.40}		780^{+728}_{−431}	0.59^{+0.12}_{−0.11}		microlensing	3200^{+3000}_{−1800}	0.045^{+0.076}_{−0.024}	1500^{+1000}_{−500}	
OGLE-2017-BLG-1434Lb	0.014±0.002		968±69	1.18±0.10		microlensing	2800±290	0.234±0.026	3220^{+30}_{−70}	Planet confirmed in 2021
PDS 70b	8.0±6.0	>1.3	43500	22		imaging	369.96±1.70	0.76±0.02	3972±36	
Pi Mensae c	0.0152^{+0.0026}_{−0.0027}	0.1822±0.0045	6.26790±0.00046	0.06839±0.00050	1169.8^{+2.8}_{−4.3}	transit	59.62±0.073	1.094±0.039	6037±45	
Qatar-7b	1.88±0.25	1.70±0.03	{2.0320460±0.0000097	0.0352±0.0002		transit	2364.6337	1.409±0.026	6387±38	
TCP J05074264+2447555 b	0.0289±0.0208			0.5		microlensing	1200	0.25±0.18		Also known as Kojima-1Lb
TYC 3318-1333-1 b	3.42±0.35		562.0^{+4.1}_{−4.0}	1.414±0.063		radial vel.	1622±33	1.19±0.14	4776±10	
UKIRT-2017-BLG-001Lb	1.28^{+0.37}_{−0.44}		3468^{+2324}_{−1300}	4.18^{+0.96}_{−0.88}		microlensing	20500^{+5200}_{−6800}	0.81^{+0.21}_{−0.27}	5100^{+700}_{−1300}	
WASP-134b	1.40±0.08		10.1498	0.0956±0.0025	953±22	transit	636±7	0.81±0.04	5700±100	
WASP-134c	0.70±0.07		70.01±0.14			radial vel.	636±7	0.81±0.04	5700±100	
WASP-137b	0.681±0.054	1.27±0.11	3.9080284±0.0000053	0.0519±0.0018	1601±65	transit	943±13	1.216±0.066	6100±140	
WASP-143b	0.725±0.084	1.234±0.042	3.7788730±0.0000032	0.0490±0.0014	1325±30	transit	1310±20	1.087±0.045	5900±140	
WASP-144b	0.44±0.06	0.85±0.05	2.2783152±0.0000013	0.0316±0.0005	1260±40	transit	1170±34	0.81±0.04	5200±140	
WASP-145Ab	0.89±0.04	0.90±0.40	1.7690381±0.0000008	0.0261±0.0005	1200±60	transit	298±0.8	0.76±0.04	4900±150	
WASP-146b	1.11±0.15	1.228±0.076	3.3969440±0.0000036	0.0451±0.0024	1486±43	transit	1610±90	1.057±0.085	6100±140	
WASP-147b	0.275^{+0.028}_{−0.027}	1.115^{+0.140}_{−0.093}	4.602730±0.000027	0.0549^{+0.0012}_{−0.0013}	1404^{+69}_{−43}	transit	1390±46	1.044^{+0.070}_{−0.073}	5702±100	
WASP-158b	2.79±0.23	1.07±0.15	3.656333±0.000004	0.0517±0.0018	1590±80	transit	1740±41	1.38±0.14	6350±150	
WASP-159b	0.55±0.08	1.38±0.09	3.840401±0.000007	0.0538±0.0015	1850±50	transit	2382±36	1.41±0.12	6120±140	
WASP-160Bb	0.278^{+0.044}_{−0.045}	1.090^{+0.047}_{−0.041}	3.7684952±0.0000035	0.0452±0.0012	1119^{+25}_{−23}	transit	926±16	9.750±2.280	5298±99	
WASP-161b	2.49±0.21	1.143^{+0.065}_{−0.058}	5.4060425±0.0000048	0.0673±0.0023	1557^{+34}_{−29}	transit	1130±14	1.39±0.14	6400±100	Proper name Isli
WASP-162b	5.2±0.2	1.00±0.05	9.62468±0.00001	0.0871±0.0013	910±20	transit	1023±13	0.95±0.04	5300±100	
WASP-163b	1.87±0.21	1.202±0.097	1.6096884±0.0000015	0.0266±0.0014	1638±68	transit	858±12	0.97±0.15	5500±200	
WASP-164b	2.13^{+0.12}_{−0.13}	1.128^{+0.041}_{−0.043}	1.7771255±0.0000028	0.02818^{+0.00065}_{−0.00072}	1610^{+58}_{−53}	transit	1050±23	0.9460^{+0.0670}_{−0.0710}	5806^{+190}_{−200}	
WASP-165b	0.658^{+0.097}_{−0.092}	1.26^{+0.19}_{−0.17}	3.465509±0.000023	0.04823^{+0.00091}_{−0.00092}	1624^{+93}_{−89}	transit	1900±110	1.248^{+0.072}_{−0.070}	5599±150	
WASP-166 b	0.101±0.005	0.63±0.03	5.443540±0.000004	0.0641±0.0011	1270±30	transit	368.55	1.19±0.06	6050±50	
WASP-168b	0.42±0.04	1.5^{+0.5}_{−0.3}	4.153658±0.000003	0.0519±0.0008	1340±40	transit	1000±6	1.08±0.05	6000±100	
WASP-170b	1.6±0.2	1.096±0.085	2.34478022±0.00000360	0.0337±0.0018	1422±42	transit	1005±12	0.93±0.15	5600±150	
WASP-172b	0.47±0.10	1.57±0.10	5.477433±0.000007	0.0694±0.0011	1740±60	transit	1780±50	1.49±0.07	6900±140	
WASP-173Ab	3.69±0.18	1.20±0.06	1.38665318±0.00000027	0.0248±0.0006	1880±55	transit	235±5.8	1.05±0.08	5800±140	Also known as KELT-22Ab
WASP-174b	1.3^{+0}_{−1.3}	1.3	4.233700	0.0559	1490	transit	1350	1.30	6400	
WASP-190b	1.0±0.1	1.15±0.09	5.367753±0.000004	0.0663±0.0008	1500±50	transit	1796.323	1.35±0.05	6400±100	
Wolf 503b	0.020±0.002	0.1811^{+0.0068}_{−0.0065}	6.00118^{+0.00008}_{−0.00011}	0.0571±0.0020	805±9	transit	145.4±0.3	0.688^{+0.023}_{−0.016}	4716±60	

== Specific exoplanet lists ==
Lists of exoplanets

- List of directly imaged exoplanets
- List of exoplanet extremes
- List of exoplanet firsts
- List of exoplanets discovered by the Kepler space telescope
- List of exoplanets observed during Kepler's K2 mission
- List of exoplanets discovered by the TESS mission
- List of terrestrial exoplanet candidates for atmosphere detection
- List of hottest exoplanets
- List of coldest exoplanets
- List of multiplanetary systems
- List of circumbinary planets
- List of nearest exoplanets
- List of nearest terrestrial exoplanet candidates
- List of potentially habitable exoplanets
- List of proper names of exoplanets
- List of largest exoplanets
- List of smallest exoplanets
- List of transiting exoplanets
- List of exoplanets and planetary debris around giant stars
- List of exoplanets and planetary debris around white dwarfs
- List of extrasolar planetary collisions

=== Lists of exoplanets by year of discovery ===
- List of exoplanets discovered before 2000 (31)
- List of exoplanets discovered between 2000–2009 (376)
- List of exoplanets discovered in 2010 (109)
- List of exoplanets discovered in 2011 (178)
- List of exoplanets discovered in 2012 (147)
- List of exoplanets discovered in 2013 (149)
- List of exoplanets discovered in 2014 (869)
- List of exoplanets discovered in 2015 (144)
- List of exoplanets discovered in 2016 (1497)
- List of exoplanets discovered in 2017 (152)
- List of exoplanets discovered in 2018 (300)
- List of exoplanets discovered in 2019 (169)
- List of exoplanets discovered in 2020 (256)
- List of exoplanets discovered in 2021 (253)
- List of exoplanets discovered in 2022 (312)
- List of exoplanets discovered in 2023 (304)
- List of exoplanets discovered in 2024 (284)
- List of exoplanets discovered in 2025 (239)
- List of exoplanets discovered in 2026 (351)
