= OGLE-2017-BLG-1522Lb =

Exoplanet

Discovery
- Discovered by: Y. K. Jung et al.
- Discovery site: OGLE, KMTNet
- Discovery date: 2018
- Detection method: Microlensing

Orbital characteristics
- Star: OGLE-2017-BLG-1522L

Physical characteristics
- Mass: 0.75+1.26 −0.40 M_{J}

OGLE-2017-BLG-1522Lb is an exoplanet thought to be orbiting a brown dwarf. It was discovered by KMTNet and the OGLE in 2018.

== See also ==
- List of exoplanets discovered in 2018
