= K2-288 =

Star in the constellation Taurus

Observation data Epoch J2000 Equinox ICRS
- Constellation: Taurus
- Right ascension: 03^{h} 41^{m} 46.43^{s}
- Declination: +18° 16′ 08.0″
- Apparent magnitude (V): 13.97

Characteristics
- Spectral type: M2V + M3V

Astrometry

Orbit
Primary	K2-288 A
Name	K2-288 B
Semi-major axis (a)	55 AU

Details

K2-288 A
Mass	0.52±0.02 M_{☉}
Radius	0.45±0.03 R_{☉}
Surface gravity (log g)	4.85±0.03 cgs
Temperature	3584±205 K
Metallicity [Fe/H]	−0.29±0.09 dex

K2-288 B
Mass	0.33±0.02 M_{☉}
Radius	0.32±0.03 R_{☉}
Surface gravity (log g)	4.96±0.02 cgs
Temperature	3341±276 K
Metallicity [Fe/H]	−0.21±0.09 dex

Database references
SIMBAD	data

K2-288 is a binary system of two red dwarf stars about 226 light-years from Earth in the constellation Taurus. The companion star, K2-288B, is known to host a single planet, K2-288Bb.

== Planetary system ==
In January 2019, it was announced that a team of citizen scientists had discovered a planet orbiting K2-288B.

The K2-288 planetary system
Companion (in order from star)	Mass	Semimajor axis (AU)	Orbital period (days)	Eccentricity	Inclination (°)	Radius
b	—	0.164 ± 0.03	31.393463+0.000067 −0.000069	—	89.81+0.13 −0.17	1.90 ± 0.3 R_{🜨}
