= HD 89345 b =

Neptune-like exoplanet

- Image from 2MASS Two Micron All-Sky Survey

Orbital characteristics
- Semi-major axis: 0.1086 AU
- Eccentricity: 0.25°
- Orbital period (sidereal): 11.8143 day
- Inclination: 87.7°

Physical characteristics
- Mean radius: 0.616 R_{J}
- Mass: 0.103 M_{J}
- Temperature: 1059 K

HD 89345 b is a Neptune-like exoplanet that orbits a G-type star. It is also called K2-234b. Its mass is equivalent to 35.7 Earths, it takes 11.8 days to complete one orbit of its star, and is 0.105 AU away from its star. It was discovered by a team of 43 astrophysicists, one of which was V. Van Eylen, and was announced in 2018.

== Overview ==
The exoplanet HD 89345 b, which has a mass of 0.1 M_{J} and a radius of 0.61 R_{J}, was assigned to the class of ocean planets. The parent star of the planet, which is about 5.3 billion years old, belongs to the spectral class of G5V-G6V. It is 66 percent larger and 22 percent more massive than the Sun, and is located 413 light-years away. The effective temperature of the star is 5609 K. Considering that HD 89345 b makes one revolution around the star in 11.8 days at a distance of 0.11 AU, this planet was described by researchers as a warm subterranean with an equilibrium temperature of 1059 K.

== Discovery ==
HD 89345 b, a Saturn-sized exoplanet orbiting a slightly evolved star HD 89345, was discovered in 2018 using the transit photometry method, the process that detects distant planets by measuring the minute dimming of a star as an orbiting planet passes between it and the Earth. It is the only planet orbiting around HD 89345, a G5 class star, situated in the constellation of Leo in 413 light-years from the Sun. This star is aged 9.4 billion years. HD 89345 b orbits its star in about 12 terrestrial days in an elliptical orbit. The orbit is closer to the star than the inner limit of the habitable zone. It has a low density and can be composed of gas.

Its parent star, HD 89345, is a bright star (apparent magnitude 9.3) observed by the K2 mission with one-minute time sampling. It exhibits solar-like oscillations. The data is collected by asteroseismology, which enables to determine the parameters of the star and find its mass and radius. Its mass is 1.12^{+0.04}_{−0.01} M_{☉} and its mean radius is 1.657^{+0.020}_{−0.004} R_{☉}. The star appears to have recently left the main sequence, based on the inferred age, 9.4^{+0.4}_{−1.3} Gyr, and the non-detection of mixed modes. The star hosts a "warm Saturn" with an orbital period of approximately 11.8 days and a radius of 6.86±0.14 R_{🜨}. Radial-velocity follow-up observations performed with the FIES, HARPS, and HARPS-N spectrographs show that the planet has a mass of 35.7±3.3 M_{🜨}. The data also show that the planet's orbit is eccentric ($e \thickapprox 0.2$).

== See also ==
- List of potentially habitable exoplanets
- List of exoplanet firsts
- List of exoplanetary host stars
- List of exoplanets discovered using the Kepler spacecraft
- List of planets observed during Kepler's K2 mission
- List of nearest terrestrial exoplanet candidates
