= WASP-28 =

F-type star in the Pisces constellation

Observation data Epoch J2000.0 Equinox ICRS
- Constellation: Pisces
- Right ascension: 23^{h} 34^{m} 27.88149^{s}
- Declination: −01° 34′ 48.1101″
- Apparent magnitude (V): 12.03

Characteristics
- Evolutionary stage: main sequence
- Spectral type: F8

Astrometry
Radial velocity (R_{v})	+25.20±1.08 km/s
Proper motion (μ)	RA: +22.422 mas/yr Dec.: +10.591 mas/yr
Parallax (π)	2.9215±0.0151 mas
Distance	1,116 ± 6 ly (342 ± 2 pc)

Details
Mass	0.993±0.067 M_{☉}
Radius	1.083±0.025 R_{☉}
Surface gravity (log g)	4.370±0.018 cgs
Temperature	6150±140 K
Metallicity [Fe/H]	−0.29±0.10 dex
Rotational velocity (v sin i)	3.25±0.34 km/s
Age	5.5±2.6 Gyr

Other designations
- K2-1, EPIC 246375295, TOI-4518, TIC 398572544, WASP-28, 2MASS J23342787-0134482

Database references
SIMBAD	data
Exoplanet Archive	data

WASP-28 is a F8V-type main sequence star located 1116 light-years from Earth in the constellation of Pisces. It has a mass of 0.9 solar masses and a radius of 1.08 solar radii. It is an aged and cool star being around 5 billion years old and having a temperature at around 6100 Kelvin.

== Planetary system ==
The only known exoplanet orbiting around this star is WASP-28b, a highly irradiated and inflated hot Jupiter. It has a mass of 0.9 Jupiters and a radius of 1.3 Jupiters. It orbits at a distance of 0.044 AU taking about 3.4 days to complete an orbit around its star. The orbit has an eccentricity of 0.975 and an inclination of 88.61°.

The WASP-28 planetary system
Companion (in order from star)	Mass	Semimajor axis (AU)	Orbital period (days)	Eccentricity	Inclination (°)	Radius
b	0.889±0.058 M_{J}	0.0442±0.0010	3.40883495(15)	<0.075	88.514±0.090	1.219±0.028 R_{J}
