= K2-66b =

Mega-Earth exoplanet orbiting K2-66

Discovery
- Discovered by: K2
- Discovery date: 2017
- Detection method: Transit

Orbital characteristics
- Semi-major axis: 0.05983±0.00072 AU
- Orbital period (sidereal): 5.06963±0.00081 d
- Inclination: 86.6+4.4 −2.4°
- Star: K2-66

Physical characteristics
- Mean radius: 2.49 R_{🜨}
- Mass: 0.06702 M_{J}
- Mean density: 7.6 g/cm^{3}

K2-66b is a confirmed mega-Earth orbiting the subgiant K2-66, about 520 parsecs (1,700 ly) from Earth in the direction of Aquarius. It is an extremely hot and dense planet heavier than Neptune, but with only about half its radius.

== Planet properties ==
=== Mass, radius, and temperature ===
K2-66b is a mega-Earth with radius 2.49 R_{🜨} and mass 21.3 M_{🜨}. The planet's temperature is highly variable due to the variability of its host star, and is currently estimated at 1,372 K (1,099 °C; 2,010 °F).

=== Orbit ===
The planet orbits every 5.07 days at 0.06 AU. It orbits within a "photoevaporation desert", where orbiting exoplanets should be very uncommon. K2-66b's orbit is nearly circular.

== Star ==
The star, K2-66 is a G1 sub-giant in Aquarius. It has a sun-like temperature of 5887 K, which corresponds to its spectral class and is very close to that of the rotationally variable star Kepler-130. It has a radius of 1.67 R_{☉} and a mass of 1.11 M_{☉}. Its metallicity is −0.047, and its apparent magnitude is 11.71.

== See also ==
- Kepler
- Mega-Earth
- K2-56b
- Sub-giant
- G-type main sequence star
- Density
- List of exoplanets discovered in 2017
- List of exoplanets discovered in 2016
- Lava planet
- Stellar evolution
