= K2-239 =

Star

Observation data Epoch J2000 Equinox ICRS
- Constellation: Sextans
- Right ascension: 10^{h} 42^{m} 22.6343^{s}
- Declination: +04° 26′ 28.886″
- Apparent magnitude (V): 14.549

Characteristics
- Evolutionary stage: Main sequence
- Spectral type: M3V

Astrometry
Radial velocity (R_{v})	−21.15(99) km/s
Proper motion (μ)	RA: −42.338(19) mas/yr Dec.: 4.147(22) mas/yr
Parallax (π)	32.1290±0.0190 mas
Distance	101.51 ± 0.06 ly (31.12 ± 0.02 pc)

Details
Mass	0.40 ± 0.01 M_{☉}
Radius	0.36 ± 0.01 R_{☉}
Luminosity	0.016 ± 0.001 L_{☉}
Surface gravity (log g)	4.9 ± 0.1 cgs
Temperature	3420 ± 18 K
Metallicity [Fe/H]	-0.1 ± 0.1 dex

Other designations
- EPIC 248545986

Database references
SIMBAD	data
Exoplanet Archive	data

K2-239 (also designated EPIC 248545986) is a small red dwarf star in the constellation Sextans, about 32 parsecs (101 light-years) away from Earth. Observed by the Kepler Space Telescope during Campaign 14 of its K2 "Second Light" mission, it was found to have three hot, likely rocky Earth-sized planets in orbit around it.

== Stellar characteristics ==
K2-239 is a small red dwarf star of spectral class M3V. It is 40% the mass and 36% the radius of the Sun with just 0.016 times the luminosity. It has a temperature of 3420 K and its age is unknown. For comparison, the Sun has a temperature of 5778 K and is 4.5 billion years old. K2-239 has a visual magnitude of 14.549, far too dim to see with the unaided eye. It is also one of the closer systems found by Kepler, only about 101 light-years away from Earth.

== Planetary System ==
The K2-239 planetary system
Companion (in order from star)	Mass	Semimajor axis (AU)	Orbital period (days)	Eccentricity	Inclination (°)	Radius
b	1.4 ± 0.4 M_{🜨}	0.0441 ± 0.0008	5.240 ± 0.001	—	88.99 ^{+0.68}_{−0.87}	1.1 ± 0.1 R_{🜨}
c	0.9 ± 0.3 M_{🜨}	0.0576 ± 0.0009	7.775 ± 0.001	—	88.77 ^{+0.70}_{−0.57}	1.0 ± 0.1 R_{🜨}
d	1.3 ± 0.4 M_{🜨}	0.0685 ± 0.0012	10.115 ± 0.001	—	89.43 ^{+0.38}_{−0.45}	1.1 ± 0.1 R_{🜨}

K2-239 has a system of three small, Earth-sized planets in a tight 2:3:4 orbital resonance chain. All of them are between 1.0 and 1.1 times the size of Earth, meaning they are very likely to be rocky. The discovery team estimated their masses to range from 0.9 M_{🜨} to 1.4 M_{🜨}, consistent with a rocky composition for each of the planets. Due to their proximity to K2-239 they are all hot; however, because the host star is just 1.6% as luminous as the Sun, they are much cooler than if they were placed around the Sun. For albedoes of 0 they would have equilibrium temperatures of 502 K (229 °C; 444 °F) for K2-239b, 427 K (154 °C; 309 °F) for K2-239c, and 399 K (126 °C; 259 °F) for K2-239d. None of them are cool enough to host liquid water or be considered potentially habitable.

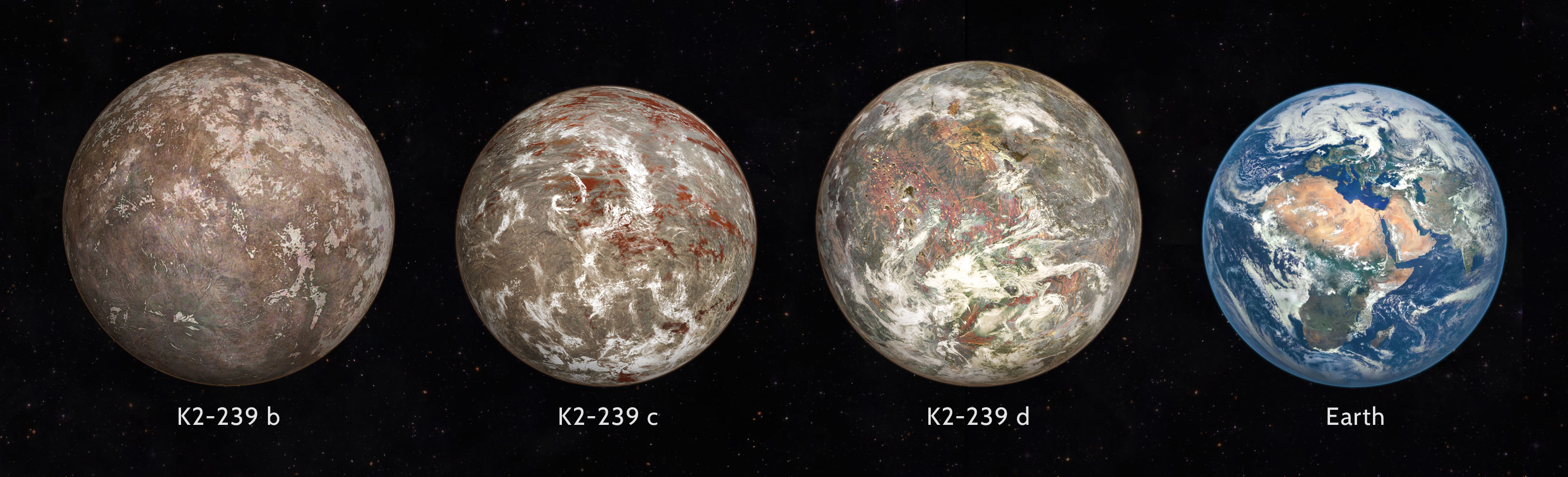
Size comparison of the three known planets of K2-239 (artistic concept) with Earth

== See also ==
- K2-148b
