= K2-288Bb =

Exoplanet orbiting K2-288B

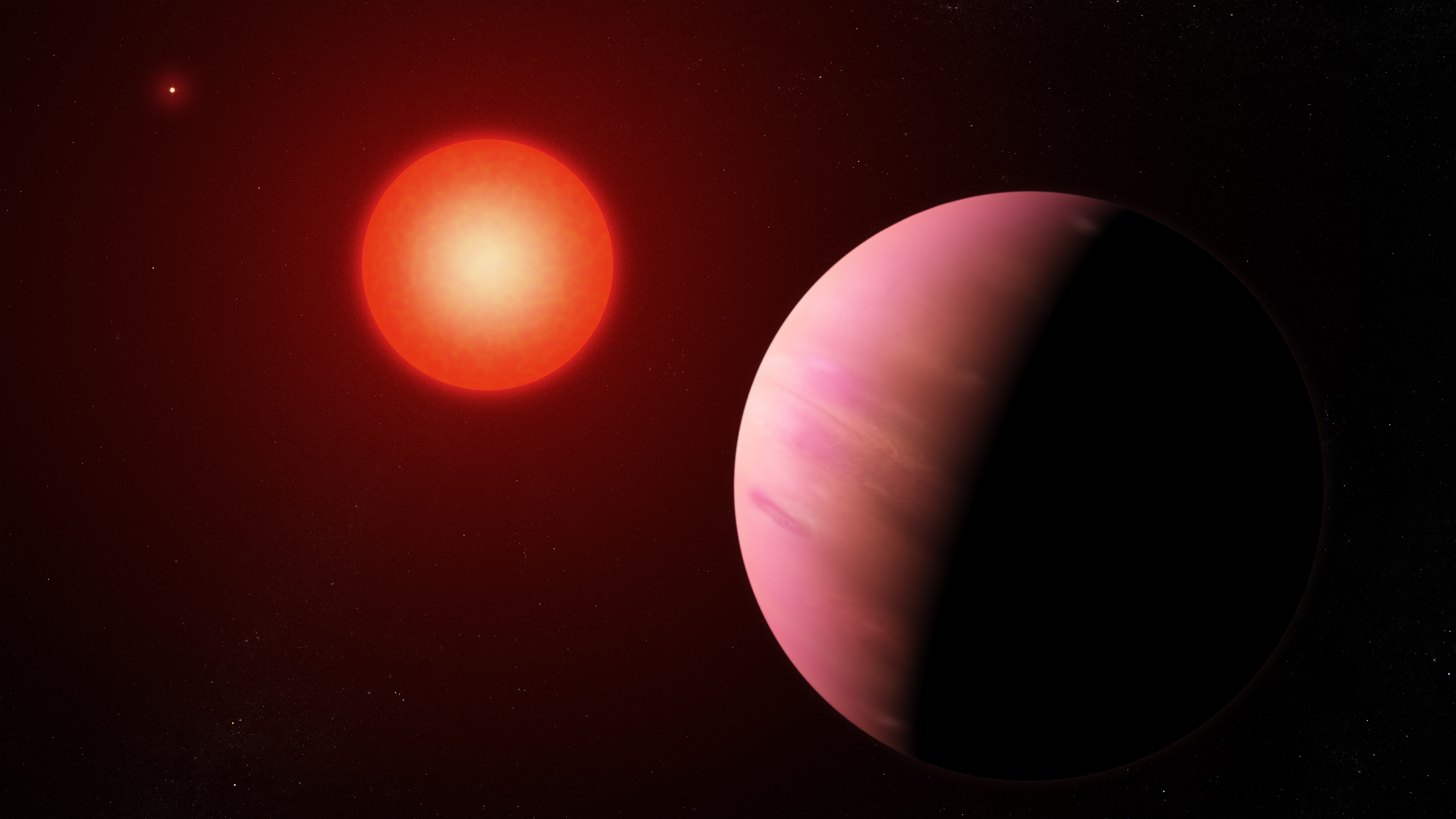
- Artist’s impression of K2-288Bb orbiting its host star K2-288B, with the primary star K2-288A in the top left corner

Discovery
- Discovery date: 7 January 2019
- Detection method: Transit

Orbital characteristics
- Semi-major axis: 0.164±0.03 AU
- Orbital period (sidereal): 31.393463 ^{+0.000067}_{−0.000069} d
- Inclination: 89.81+0.13 −0.17
- Star: K2-288B

Physical characteristics
- Mean radius: 1.90±0.3 R_{🜨}
- Temperature: 226.36 ± 22.3 K (−46.79 °C; −52.22 °F)

K2-288Bb (previously designated EPIC 210693462 b) is a super-Earth or mini-Neptune exoplanet orbiting in the habitable zone of K2-288B, a low-mass M-dwarf star in a binary star system in the constellation of Taurus about 226 light-years from Earth. It was discovered by citizen scientists while analysing data from the Kepler space telescope's K2 mission, and was announced on 7 January 2019. K2-288 is the third transiting planet system identified by the Exoplanet Explorers program, after the six planets of K2-138 and the three planets of K2-233.

K2-288Bb is likely to be in the habitable zone of its host star, and thus may be capable of supporting life, though the planet's composition is unknown.

== Discovery ==
K2-288 was observed by the Kepler space telescope during Campaign 4 of its extended K2 "Second Light" mission, lasting from April through September 2015. A group of astronomers looked through this data to try and find transiting exoplanets. However, because of Kepler's decreased stability after the failure of two reaction wheels, the start of each campaign had extreme systematic errors, and these few days of data were discarded by the team. For K2-288, they only found two transits in the remaining data, not enough to merit follow-up studies. As a result, this system was put aside for more convincing candidates.

After the first analysis, the same team used better methods to model the systematic errors caused by K2 and re-processed all the Campaign 4 data they had. However, instead of looking through it all again by eye, they decided to upload it to the new Zooniverse project Exoplanet Explorers in April 2017. Among other systems, like K2-138, citizen scientists also spotted three transits of the red dwarf star EPIC 210693462. Several volunteers started a lengthy discussion thread about the system, concluding that, with the current transit and stellar parameters, the planet candidate was very similar in both size and temperature to Earth. This caught the attention of the original team of astronomers and another at NASA Goddard who independently found the three transits at the same time, and follow-up observations were started. The group, led by Adina Feinstein, started by obtaining spectra of the star using the Keck Observatory in Hawaii, where they noticed that there was a secondary companion star. This meant there was a possibility that the second star was creating the transit signal, and it wasn't a real planet. However, the team concluded that it was far more likely to be an exoplanet and not a false positive. They used data from Kepler, as well as a transit observed by the Spitzer Space Telescope, to determine which star the planet orbited. Observations and modelling suggested the transit data was most compatible with the planet transiting the smaller, secondary star. The team was then able to calculate the radius, orbit, and temperature of the planet, and they announced their results at the 233rd American Astronomical Society meeting in Seattle on 7 January 2019.

== Characteristics ==
=== Mass, radius, and temperature ===
K2-288Bb is unusual for having a radius not commonly seen among most exoplanets. At 1.90 R_{🜨}, it falls within the so-called Fulton gap between 1.5 and 2.0 R_{🜨}. This is the range of sizes where rocky super-Earths start to accumulate thick volatile layers and turn into mini-Neptunes. Planets in the middle of this gap are uncommon, and as such, not much is known about them. K2-288Bb could either be a low-density mini-Neptune like GJ 9827 d, or a large rocky super-Earth like LHS 1140 b. Its mass is currently unknown and would require additional studies using the Radial velocity method to be determined. Based on its size, K2-288Bb is probably still undergoing atmospheric evolution and/or erosion. The planet is also orbiting in or near the habitable zone of K2-288B, where temperatures are just right for a planet to host liquid water with the right atmosphere. K2-288 Bb has an equilibrium temperature of 226.36 K (−46.79 °C; −52.22 °F) (lower than Earth's 255 K (−18 °C; −1 °F)) and receives less sunlight than Earth.

=== Orbit and rotation ===
K2-288Bb has a close orbit around the second, smaller star of the binary system. It orbits every 31.393 days at a distance of about 0.164 AU. For comparison, the Earth's Solar System's innermost planet, Mercury, orbits every 88 days at 0.38 AU. However, due to the small size of the host star, K2-288Bb is well within the habitable zone. In the unlikely possibility that the planet orbits the primary, it would have a semi-major axis of 0.231 AU and still reside in the habitable zone. K2-288Bb is probably tidally locked regardless of which star it orbits; one side of the planet would permanently face the host, while the other side would be always facing away.

=== Host stars ===
K2-288Bb is within a binary system of two red dwarf stars. The primary, K2-288A, is 52% the mass and 45% the radius of the Sun, while the secondary, K2-288B, is 33% the mass and 32% the radius. They are both much cooler and dimmer than the Sun, with temperatures of 3584 K and 3341 K, and are 0.03236 and 0.01175 times as luminous as the Sun, which has a temperature of 5772 K. Both stars are also rather metal-poor, with metallicities of -0.29 dex [Fe/H] for the primary, and -0.21 dex [Fe/H] for the secondary. In comparison, the Sun has a metallicity of 0.00 dex [Fe/H]. K2-288A and K2-288B orbit each other at a distance of about 55 AU, around six times the distance from Saturn to the Sun.

== Potential habitability ==
It is unknown if K2-288Bb is capable of supporting life. On one hand, it is likely well within the habitable zone of its star, with a temperate equilibrium temperature of about 226 K. However, because of its radius within the Fulton gap, there is significant uncertainty in its composition. K2-288Bb could be a potentially habitable rocky or water-rich world, but it might also be a hostile gas planet.

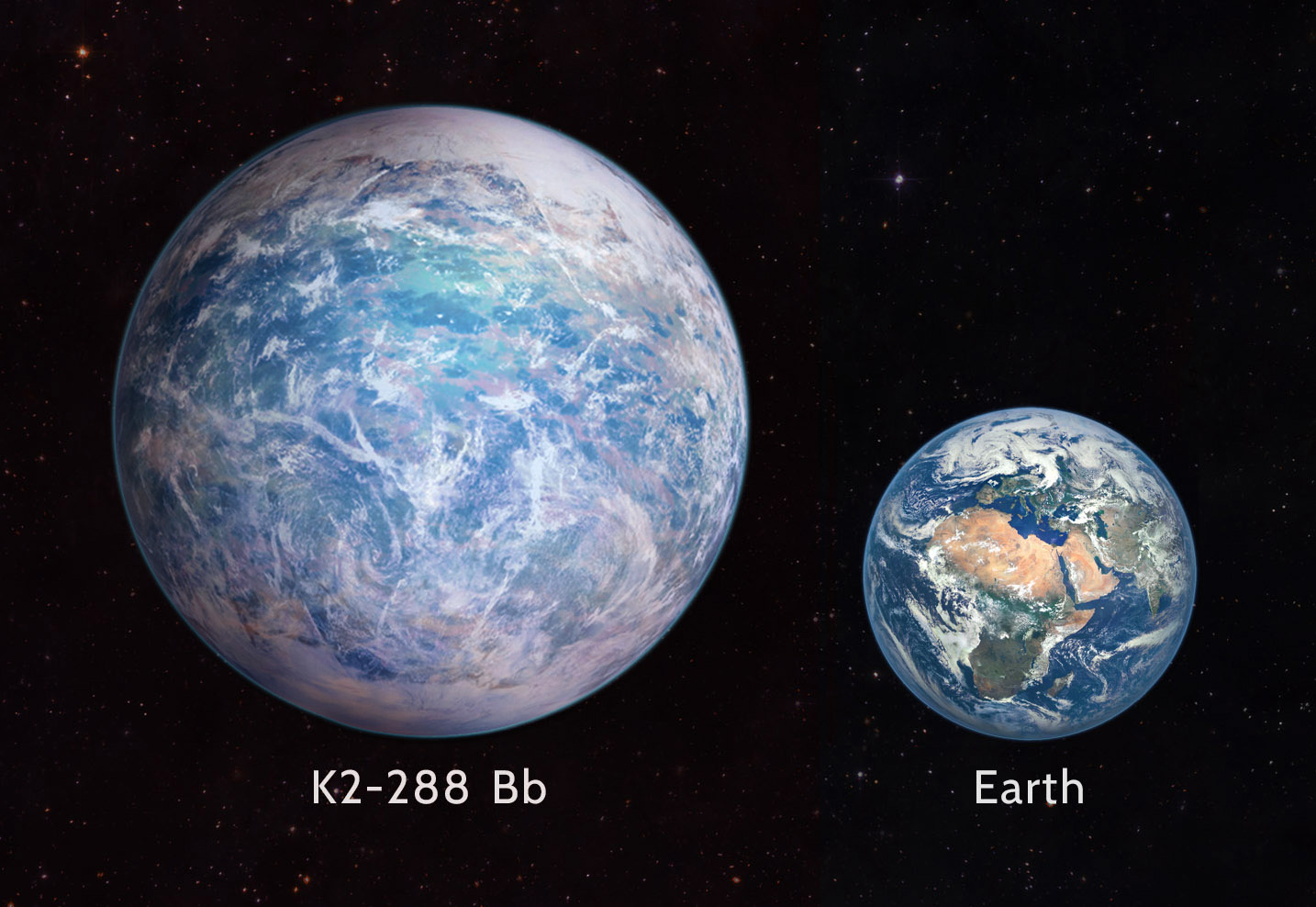
Artist's impression and size comparison of the planet K2-288Bb with Earth

== See also ==
- K2-138
- List of exoplanet extremes
- List of potentially habitable exoplanets
