= HD 219666 b =

Hot Neptune with water-rich atmosphere and lacking Methane

Discovery
- Discovery date: 2018
- Detection method: Transit

Orbital characteristics
- Semi-major axis: 0.06356 AU
- Orbital period (sidereal): 6.03607 d
- Star: HD 219666

Physical characteristics
- Mean radius: 4.71 Earth radius
- Mass: 16.6 M_{🜨}
- Temperature: 1073 K

HD 219666b is a hot Neptune type exoplanet that orbits around the G-type main sequence star named HD 219666 (also known as TOI-118). It orbits the star at a distance of 0.06 AU with an orbital period of 6.03 days. The close orbit of the planet makes the temperature of the planet rise to 1073 Kelvin. The planet has a mass of 16.6 Earth masses with a radius of 4.71 Earth radii. It was discovered in 2018 using the transit method of exoplanet detection.

HD 219666b has an atmosphere that is rich in water vapor but is significantly depleted in methane.
