= K2-236b =

Exoplanet

- A high angular resolution image EPIC 211945201 taken using the NIRC2 instrument on the 10m Keck II telescope

Discovery
- Discovery date: May 10, 2017
- Detection method: Doppler spectroscopy (Transit)

Designations
- Alternative names: EPIC 211945201 b

Orbital characteristics
- Semi-major axis: 0.148 AU
- Orbital period (sidereal): 19.4921498(77) d
- Inclination: 87.9°
- Semi-amplitude: 5.7 m/s

Physical characteristics
- Mean radius: 0.546 R_{J}
- Mass: 0.085 M_{J}
- Temperature: 817 K

K2-236b is a Neptune-like exoplanet that orbits an F-type star. It is also called EPIC 211945201 b. Its mass is 27 Earths, it takes 19.5 days to complete one orbit of its star, and is 0.148 AU from its star. Its discovery was announced in 2018. This was the first exoplanet discovered by scientists based in India. The discoverers were Abhijit Chakraborty (PRL), Arpita Roy (Caltech), Rishikesh Sharma (PRL), Suvrath Mahadevan (Penn State), Priyanka Chaturvedi (Thüringer Landessternwarte Tautenburg), Neelam J. S. S. V. Prasad (PRL), and B. G. Anandarao (PRL).

== Overview ==
The exoplanet K2-236b was discovered in 2018 using the transit method. Using this method, astronomers can photometrically analyze the atmospheric composition of other planets, detecting compounds such as methane and water vapor. It is the only planet orbiting around EPIC 211945201, a G0 class star, situated in the constellation of Cancer at a distance of 596 light-years from the Sun. Its host star is aged 4 billion years. K2-236b orbits its star in about 19 terrestrial days. It orbits closer to the star than the internal limit of the habitable zone. It has a low density and may be composed of gas.

== Discovery ==
K2-236b was found to be a planetary candidate from K2 photometry in Campaigns 5 & 16. The exoplanet transits the bright star (V_{mag} = 10.15, G0 spectral type) in a 19.492 day orbit. The photometric data combined with false positive probability calculations using VESPA may not be sufficient to confirm the planetary scenario, but high-resolution spectroscopic are taken using the PARAS spectrograph (19 radial velocity observations) over a time-baseline of 420 days.

The data shows that the planet has a radius of 6.12 ± 0.1 R_{🜨} and a mass of 27+14
−12.6 M_{🜨}. It consists of a density of 0.65+0.34
−0.30 g/cm^{3}. Based on the mass and radius, it is estimated that the heavy element content is 60-70 % of the total mass. The surface temperature of the planet was found to be around 817 K (544 °C; 1,011 °F), as it is very close to the host star. It is seven times nearer to its star, in comparison with Earth-Sun distance. This shows that the extra-solar planet is in the uninhabitable zone. The discovery is of importance for understanding the formation mechanism of such super-Neptune or sub-Saturn planets that are too close to the host star, according to scientists.

== See also ==
- List of exoplanet firsts
- List of exoplanetary host stars
- List of exoplanets discovered using the Kepler spacecraft
- List of planets observed during Kepler's K2 mission
