= WASP-28b =

Strongly-irradiated hot Jupiter

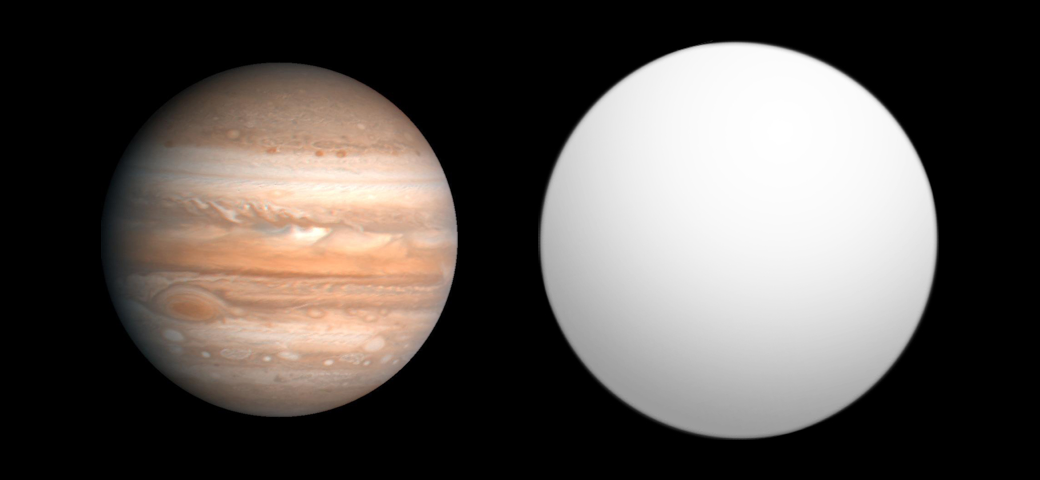
- Size comparison of WASP-28b with Jupiter.

Discovery
- Discovered by: Wide Angle Search for Planets
- Discovery date: 2010
- Detection method: Transit

Orbital characteristics
- Semi-major axis: 0.0442±0.0010 AU
- Eccentricity: <0.075
- Orbital period (sidereal): 3.40883495±0.00000015 d
- Inclination: 88.61 ± 0.67
- Star: WASP-28

Physical characteristics
- Mean radius: 1.319+0.028 −0.026 R_{J}
- Mass: 0.948+0.051 −0.052 M_{J}
- Temperature: 1468 ± 37 K

WASP-28b or K2-1b is an extrasolar planet discovered in 2010 by the Wide Angle Search for Planets (WASP) project orbiting WASP-28, a magnitude 12 star also known as 1SWASP J233427.87-013448.1, 2MASS J23342787-0134482 and K2-1. Since it orbits its star very closely, the planet is a strongly irradiated hot Jupiter. As seen from the Earth, WASP-28b transits its host star every 3.41 days taking about 3 hours to do so.

The planet was observed by the Kepler space telescope during the K2 mission engineering campaign in February 2014 as part of an early science demonstration. It was also observed from December 2016 to March 2017 during K2's campaign 12 which allowed a refinement of the system parameters.

== Internal structure ==
The planet seems to be a gas giant with a low core mass (<~10M(Earth)) and a low heavy elements content (Z<~0.2).
