= K2-19 =

Orangish-hued star in the constellation Virgo

Observation data Epoch J2000 Equinox ICRS
- Constellation: Virgo
- Right ascension: 11^{h} 39^{m} 50.4803^{s}
- Declination: +00° 36′ 12.875″
- Apparent magnitude (V): 13.002±0.009

Characteristics
- Evolutionary stage: main sequence
- Spectral type: K0 V or G9V
- Apparent magnitude (J): 11.596±0.024
- Apparent magnitude (H): 11.208±0.022
- Apparent magnitude (K): 11.161±0.026
- Apparent magnitude (B): 13.798±0.020
- Variable type: Planetary transit variable

Astrometry
Radial velocity (R_{v})	−7.2296±0.0080 km/s
Proper motion (μ)	RA: −18.673±0.022 mas/yr Dec.: +4.571±0.015 mas/yr
Parallax (π)	3.3410±0.0196 mas
Distance	976 ± 6 ly (299 ± 2 pc)

Details
Mass	0.892±0.034 M_{☉}
Radius	0.824±0.024 R_{☉}
Surface gravity (log g)	4.556±0.024 cgs
Temperature	5350±110 K
Metallicity [Fe/H]	+0.03±0.02 dex
Rotation	18.36±0.51 d
Rotational velocity (v sin i)	3.00±0.50 km/s
Age	1.70±0.25 Gyr

Other designations
- UCAC4 454-050261, EPIC 201505350, 2MASS J11395048+0036129, Gaia DR3 3798833775141351552

Database references
SIMBAD	data
Exoplanet Archive	data

K2-19 is an early K-type or late G-type main sequence star that is magnetically active, and has a light curve that exhibits variations in brightness of ~1%. It is located approximately 976 light-years away in the constellation Virgo. Three confirmed transiting exoplanets are known to orbit this star.

== Planetary system ==
=== Discovery ===
The two outer planets were reported as planet candidates during analysis of data from Campaign 1 of the Kepler space telescope's K2 extended mission. Both planets were confirmed by David J. Armstrong and collaborators, who used ground-based telescopes to detect additional transits and measure hour-long transit-timing variations for K2-19b. They were independently validated along with 20 other planets by Benjamin T. Montet and team.

K2-19d was first reported as a planet candidate during a search for candidates from the first year of the K2 Mission and was later validated by Sinukoff et al.

A fourth possible planet orbiting further out was reported in 2025.

=== Characteristics ===
K2-19 has a planetary system with three known planets, of which the two larger ones, K2-19b and K2-19c, are either close to the 3:2 mean motion resonance or inside it. All three planets orbit closer to their star than the planet Mercury does to the Sun.

The K2-19 planetary system
Companion (in order from star)	Mass	Semimajor axis (AU)	Orbital period (days)	Eccentricity	Inclination (°)	Radius
d	<6.2 M_{🜨}	0.03478±0.00043	2.50827+0.00027 −0.00014	<0.44	89.7±1.6	1.044±0.064 R_{🜨}
b	30.8±1.3 M_{🜨}	0.07487±0.00090	7.922806±0.000090	0.040±0.024	89.70±0.26	6.59±0.22 R_{🜨}
c	11.12±0.44 M_{🜨}	0.0982±0.0012	11.89770±0.00046	0.067±0.017	89.37±0.15	3.88±0.14 R_{🜨}
e (candidate)	<2.0 M_{🜨}	0.1387±0.0017	19.9724±0.0054	<0.15	89.20+0.17 −0.43	1.22±0.15 R_{🜨}
