= K2-155d =

Exoplanet in constellation Taurus

Discovery
- Discovered by: Teruyuki Hirano et al.
- Discovery site: Tokyo Institute of Technology
- Discovery date: March 2018
- Detection method: Transit method

Designations
- Alternative names: LP 415-17 c EPIC 210897587 c

Orbital characteristics
- Semi-major axis: 0.1886±0.0066 AU
- Eccentricity: unknown
- Orbital period (sidereal): 40.6835±0.0031 d
- Inclination: unknown
- Star: K2-155

Physical characteristics
- Mean radius: 1.64+0.18 −0.17 R_{🜨}
- Mean density: 5.41±1.11 g/cm^{3}
- Temperature: 289 K (16 °C; 61 °F)

K2-155d is a potentially habitable Super-Earth exoplanet in the K2-155 system. It is the outermost of three known planets orbiting around the K-type star K2-155 in the constellation Taurus, approximately 290 light-years (89 parsecs) from Earth. It is one of 15 new exoplanets around red dwarf stars discovered by Japanese astronomer Teruyuki Hirano of the Tokyo Institute of Technology and his team. The team used data from NASA's Kepler space telescope during its extended K2 "Second Light" mission. K2-155d orbits near the so-called habitable zone of its system, and has the potential to host liquid water.

== Discovery and observations ==
K2-155d is one of 15 exoplanets discovered by a team of Japanese astronomers led by Teruyuki Hirano at the Tokyo Institute of Technology. Its discovery is based on data from the K2 mission of NASA's Kepler spacecraft. The exoplanet has also been observed from ground-based telescopes including the Nordic Optical Telescope (NOT) in La Palma and the Subaru Telescope in Hawaii. Its characteristics were confirmed using speckle imaging and high-dispersion optical spectroscopy. The mass of K2-155d and the brightness of its host star may be measured by future observations from the W. M. Keck Observatory and the James Webb Space Telescope. The brightness of its host star makes K2-155d a good target for future studies using instruments such as the James Webb Space Telescope.

In October 2026, China astronomers used the world's biggest single-dish radio telescope FAST data to conduct a deep scan of 33 exoplanet systems via newly introduced wavelet-integrated search pipeline for narrowband technosignature candidates in dynamic radio spectra.

From the direction of K2-155 came a narrowband drifting signal at 1148.4167 MHz exhibiting a downward drift at approximately −0.038 Hz s^{−1} over the observation.

˚Natural astrophysical processes rarely generate extremely narrow spectral features while engineered transmitters often do,” writes a team of astronomers including first author Zi-Qi Li of Beijing Normal University in a paper published in The Astronomical Journal. The repeated appearance of narrowband features dominated by YY polarization near the same frequency in several observations at the same timestamp strongly favors a common interference origin over a signal located at K2-155. However, there was no obvious explanation as well. Aviation systems in the 960–1215 MHz region are predominantly short pulsed bursts that do not naturally reproduce a smooth, continuous drifting track. Known satellites and GNSS illumination frequencies are separated from 1148 MHz by tens of megahertz and do not naturally account for the high degree of linear polarization observed. Consequently, the candidate remains unclassified.

== Characteristics ==
K2-155d is a super-Earth exoplanet with a radius 1.64 times that of Earth, near the transition zone between small rock-based and larger gaseous planets. Climate models predict that it is located near its star's habitable zone and has an insolation 1.67 ± 0.38 (between 1.29 and 2.05) times that of Earth. Its physical temperature is estimated to be 289 K (16 °C; 61 °F). Studies have shown that the planet would maintain a moderate surface temperature if its insolation is smaller than ~1.5 times that of Earth.

K2-155d is one of three known planets in the system orbiting K2-155, a red dwarf star located 62.3 parsecs (203 ly) from Earth. Its parent star has 88% less volume than the Sun. K2-155d orbits its star with a 40.7-day period, but as the planet is tidally locked the same side always faces its sun. K2-155d has an orbital radius of 0.1886 AU and studies suggest that the planet has a low orbital eccentricity.

== Potential habitability ==
K2-155d has been labeled a potentially habitable planet that may be able to harbor liquid water. A three-dimensional climate simulation was used to confirm the possibility of the existence of water. However, its discoverer Teruyuki Hirano was cautious about the findings, stating that they do not guarantee K2-155d is habitable, as the ranges in its orbit and temperature allow the possibility of it being outside the habitable zone. Factors such as the absence of solar flares could also decide if K2-155d is habitable.

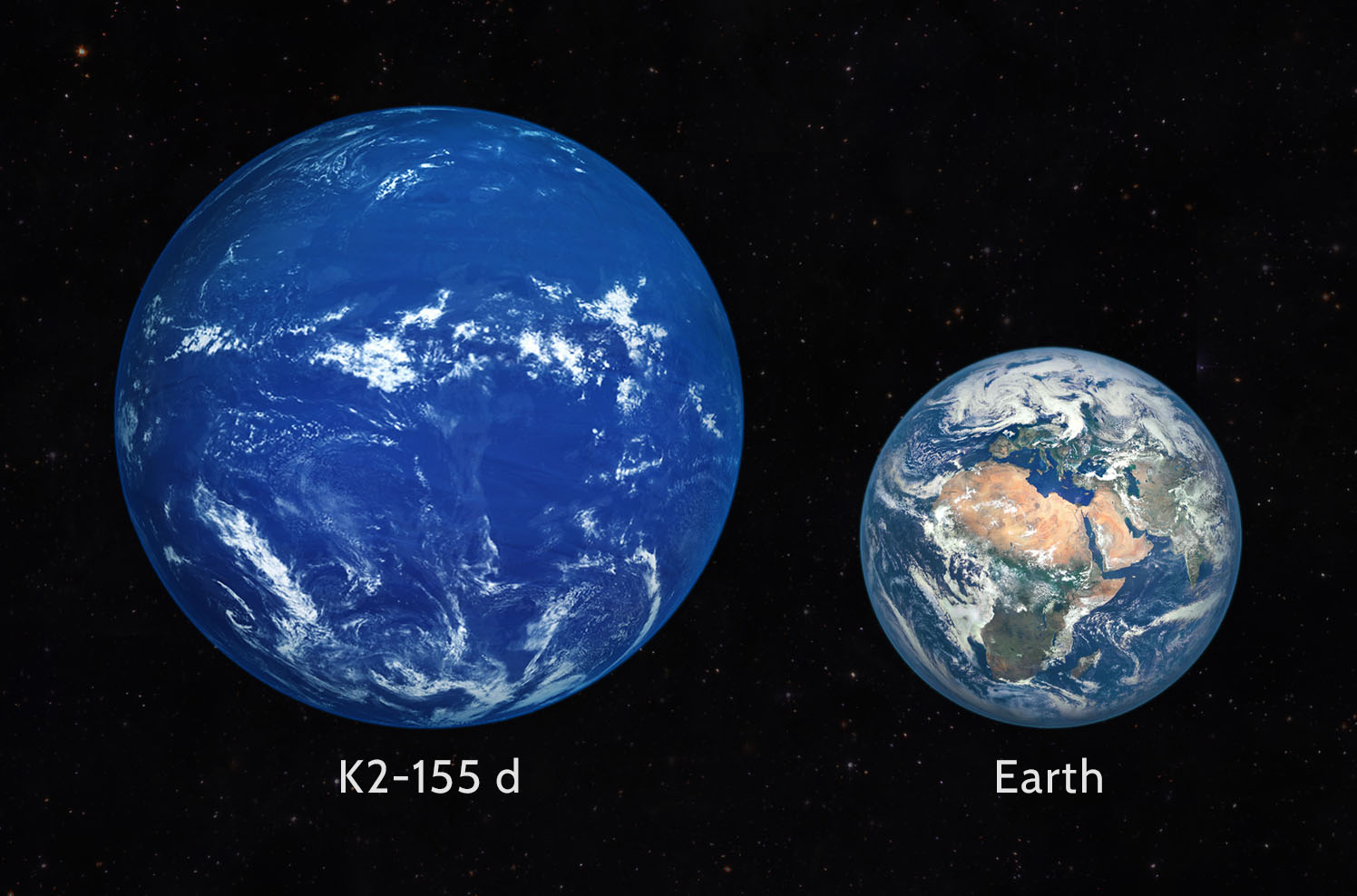
Size comparison of the planet K2-155 d (artistic concept) with Earth
