= K2-138 =

Star in the constellation Aquarius

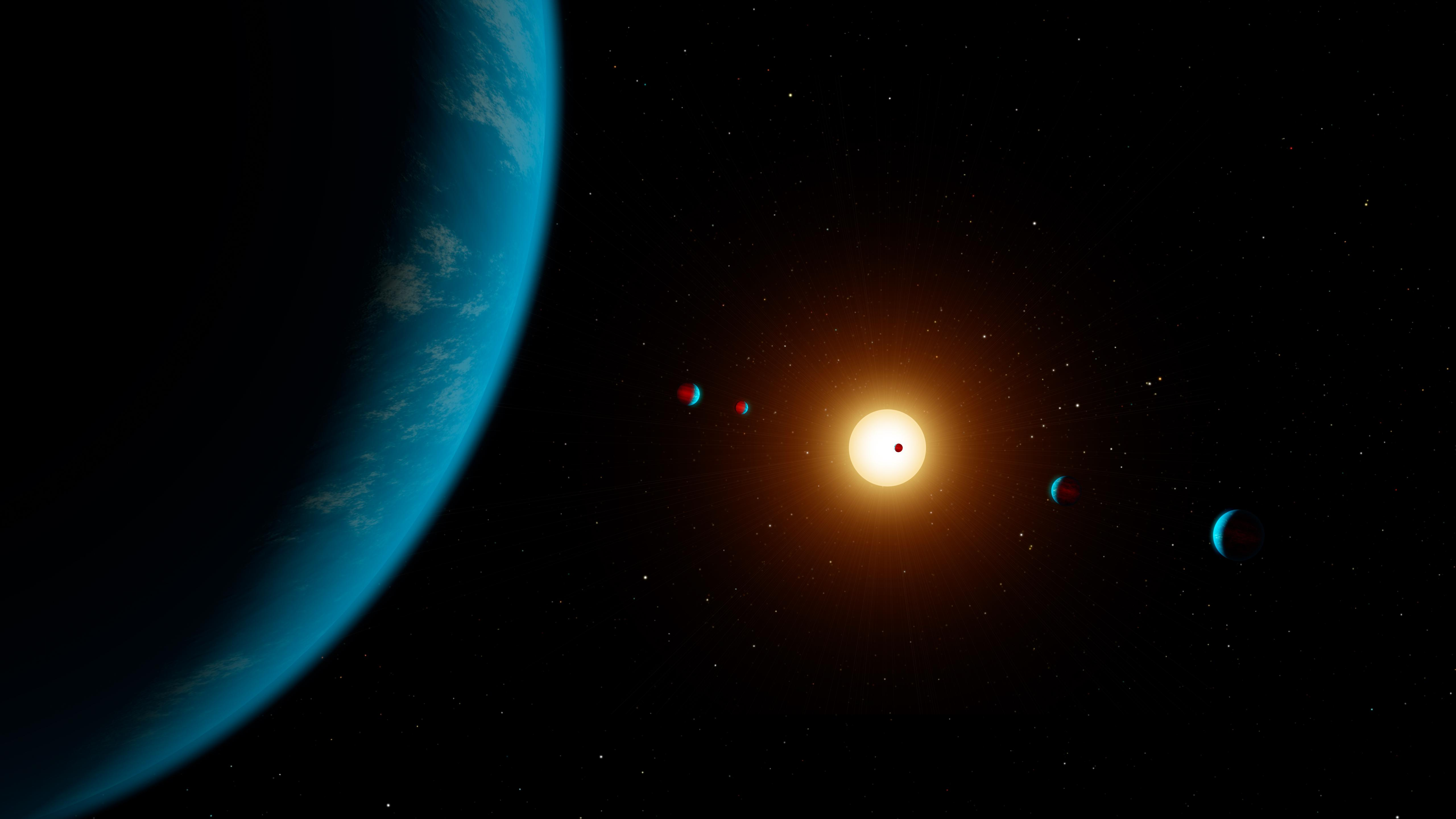
- Artist’s impression of the K2-138 system

Observation data Epoch J2000 Equinox ICRS
- Constellation: Aquarius
- Right ascension: 23^{h} 15^{m} 47.76861^{s}
- Declination: −10° 50′ 58.8955″
- Apparent magnitude (V): 12.21

Characteristics
- Evolutionary stage: Main sequence
- Spectral type: K1V

Astrometry
Radial velocity (R_{v})	0.77±0.49 km/s
Proper motion (μ)	RA: −1.080 mas/yr Dec.: −10.675 mas/yr
Parallax (π)	4.9437±0.0150 mas
Distance	660 ± 2 ly (202.3 ± 0.6 pc)

Details
Mass	0.93 ± 0.06 M_{☉}
Radius	0.86 ± 0.08 R_{☉}
Luminosity	~0.554 L_{☉}
Surface gravity (log g)	4.59 ± 0.07 cgs
Temperature	5378 ± 60 K
Metallicity [Fe/H]	+0.16 ± 0.04 dex
Age	2.3+0.44 −0.36 Gyr

Other designations
- EE-1, EPIC 245950175, 2MASS J23154776-1050590

Database references
SIMBAD	data
Exoplanet Archive	data

K2-138, also designated EPIC 245950175 or EE-1, is a K-type main-sequence star with a system of six exoplanets discovered by citizen scientists. Four were found in the first two days of the Exoplanet Explorers project on Zooniverse in April 2017, while two more were revealed in further analysis. The system is about 660 light-years (200 parsecs) away in the constellation Aquarius, within K2 Campaign 12.

== Planetary system ==
K2-138 is notable for its large number of planets, all found through the efforts of citizen scientists. (Note: While the publication cites some of the citizen scientist that are discoverers of the planets in the publication, many are only mentioned on the website.) They are designated K2-138b, c, d, e, f, and g in order from their host star. The first five were validated by Christiansen et al., while K2-138g was noted as being a likely candidate. However, since there were only two transits of it, K2-138g could not be validated. There was a possibility that the two transits for this candidate were from two individual long-period planets. K2-138g was confirmed by follow-up studies in 2019 and 2021.

All six planets are within the super-Earth and sub-Neptune categories, with radii between about 1.6 R_{🜨} to 3.3 R_{🜨}. The outer five, including K2-138g, are likely small gaseous planets with no solid surface. However, the smaller K2-138b could be rocky. The masses of the planets were initially unknown, as the data for K2-138 did not have a high enough signal-to-noise ratio for transit-timing variation (TTV) analysis. However, the Spitzer Space Telescope could be able to accurately detect TTVs and lead to the masses of the planets being calculated. Planets b through f are predicted to cause TTVs on the order of 2.5 to 7.1 minutes, for predicted masses between 4 M_{🜨} and 7 M_{🜨}.

The five validated planets of K2-138 are very close to the parent star and form an unbroken chain of near-3:2 resonances. Their orbital periods range from 2.35 to 12.76 days, with the sixth planet orbiting much further out with a period of about 42 days. K2-138b, c, d, e, and f are locked in several chains of three-body resonances, a feat shared by only a handful of systems, including TRAPPIST-1 and Kepler-80. Like the former, K2-138 could show the end result of slow, inward disk migration.

Spitzer observations of K2-138g were announced on the AAS Meeting #233. The iPoster shows of K2-138g with an updated radius of about 3.7 R_{🜨}, making it the largest planet in the system. This result was preliminary until being confirmed in February 2021. The planet g could be in a first-order three-planet resonance (3P-MMR) with planet e and f. This would make the system a six-planet resonant chain.

A team of astronomers collected 215 spectra over 79 nights with the instrument HARPS mounted on the ESO 3.6 m Telescope. With a Bayesian analysis of the K2 photometry and HARPS radial-velocities (RVs) the team were able to constrain the mass of planet b to e. The bulk densities of the planets range from Earth-like density for planet b to Neptune-like density for planet e. The determination of masses and densities constrains the composition of the planets. They have likely rocky cores and a substantial atmospheric layer, composed of volatile molecules. For planets f and g this team was able to constrain the upper limit of the mass to 8.7 and 25.5 earth masses.

A paper by Acuña et al. studied the water content of the K2-138 system, assuming a volatile layer constituted of water in steam and supercritical phases. This paper found that the planet b has an upper water-mass-fraction of 0.7% and is a volatile-poor planet. Planet b could have formed with a thick water atmosphere that was blown away by XUV-radiation coming from the host star, a process which is called photoevaporation.

Planet f is possibly the most water-rich planet in the system, with an estimated upper water-mass-fraction of 66%. The radius of planet g is larger than a planet with a water-rich composition and the researchers conclude that planet g likely has an atmosphere rich in hydrogen and helium and in this case the upper volatile-mass fraction would be only 5%. All planets of the system likely have a less massive core compared to earth.

K2-138 was selected as a target by ESA in the first Announcement of Opportunity (AO-1) Program of the CHEOPS mission, which was launched in December 2019. For 87.6 orbits the spacecraft will record the transits to measure TTVs of the planets. K2-138 could become a benchmark system to compare RV and TTV masses. The system is also a good candidate to search for co-orbital bodies, which are predicted to exist and to be stable in resonant chain systems like K2-138. CHEOPS observations did not detect planet b, which could be the result of a large error in the ephemeris due to precession of the planet. Planets in K2-138 have detected TTVs in the order of 10 minutes, only planet d shows TTVs up to 60 minutes. The number of transits observed were not enough to perform a full TTV analysis. The masses are consistent with previous RV masses, except for planet d, which showed a low mass and high eccentricity in the first-order TTV analysis. A better sample of TTVs is needed to resolve this issue.

The K2-138 planetary system
Companion (in order from star)	Mass	Semimajor axis (AU)	Orbital period (days)	Eccentricity	Inclination (°)	Radius
b	3.1±1.1 M_{🜨}	0.03385+0.00023 −0.00029	2.35309±0.00022	<0.1887	87.2+1.2 −1.0	1.510+0.110 −0.084 R_{🜨}
c	6.3+1.1 −1.2 M_{🜨}	0.04461+0.00030 −0.00038	3.559823±0.000050	<0.1917	88.1±0.7	2.299+0.120 −0.087 R_{🜨}
d	7.9+1.4 −1.3 M_{🜨}	0.05893+0.00040 −0.00050	5.405362±0.000038	<0.1441	89.0±0.6	2.390+0.104 −0.084 R_{🜨}
e	13.0±2.0 M_{🜨}	0.07820+0.00053 −0.00066	8.261334±0.000011	<0.1829	88.6±0.3	3.390+0.156 −0.110 R_{🜨}
f	2.47±1.63 M_{🜨}	0.10447+0.00070 −0.00088	12.756618±0.000061	<0.2098	88.8±0.2	2.904+0.164 −0.111 R_{🜨}
g	2.56±1.59 M_{🜨}	0.23109+0.00154 −0.00196	41.965443±0.000061	<0.2256	89.4+0.4 −0.3	3.013+0.303 −0.251 R_{🜨}

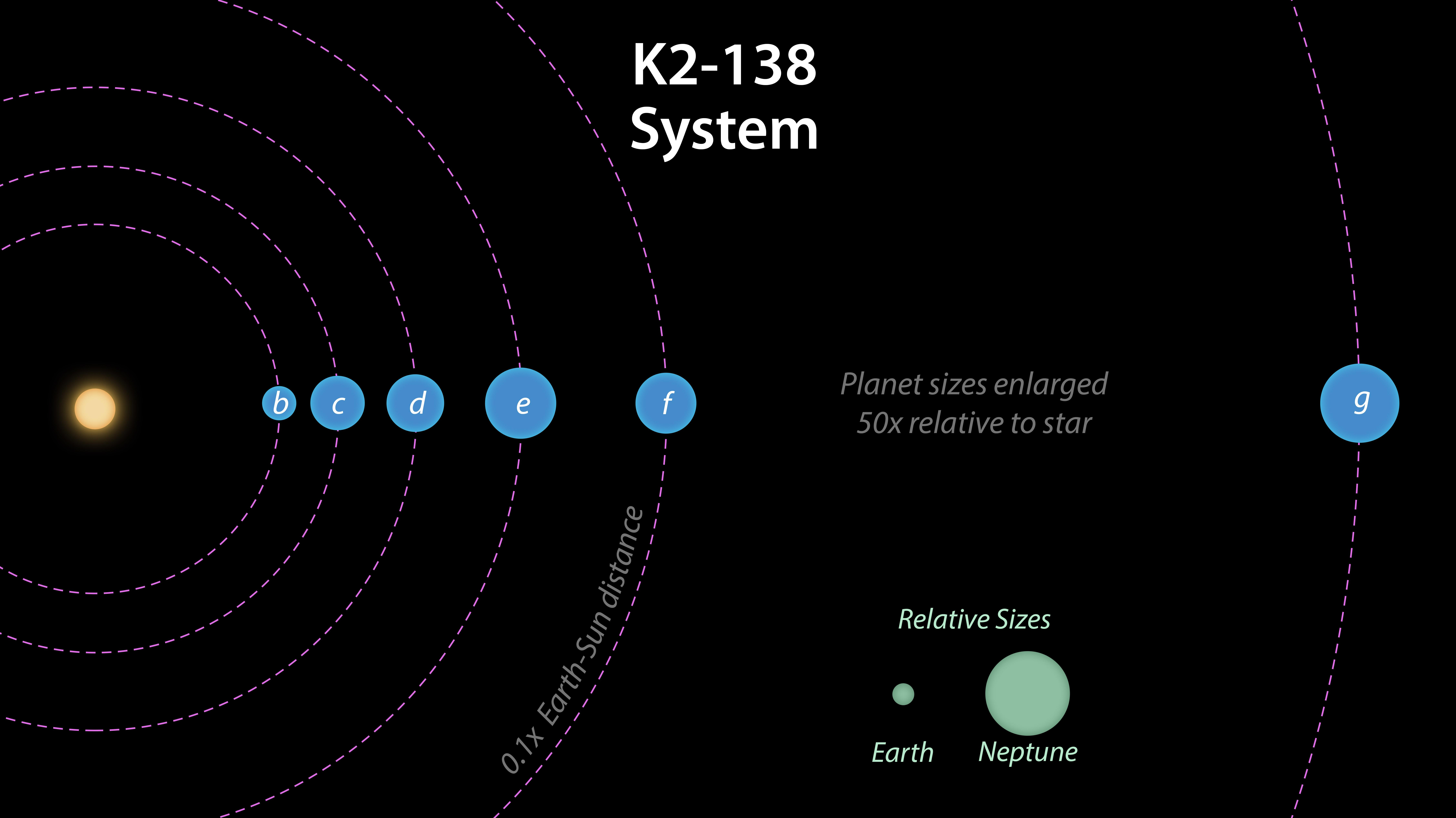
K2-138 planetary system (artist concept)

== See also ==
- Amateur exoplanet discoveries
- K2-288Bb, another planet found by citizen scientists from Exoplanet Explorers
- Kepler-86
- Kepler-90
- PH1b
- TRAPPIST-1
