= K2-138b =

Extrasolar planet

Discovery
- Discovered by: Jessie L. Christiansen et al.
- Discovery site: Kepler
- Discovery date: 11 January 2018
- Detection method: Transit

Orbital characteristics
- Epoch BJD 2457773.3170
- Semi-major axis: 0.03380 AU (5,056,000 km)
- Eccentricity: <0.403
- Orbital period (sidereal): 2.35322 d
- Inclination: 86.9
- Star: K2-138

Physical characteristics
- Mean radius: 1.57 R_{🜨}
- Mass: 3.1+1.1 −1.1 M_{🜨}
- Mean density: 4.9+2.0 −1.8 g/cm^{−3}

K2-138b is a potentially rocky super-Earth exoplanet orbiting around the star K2-138. The planet, along with the four others in the system, was found by citizen scientists of the Exoplanet Explorers project on Zooniverse. It was the final planet found in the system and was officially announced in 2018.

K2-138b is a planet with a radius of 1.57 R_{🜨}, meaning it could be rocky. It orbits its host star every 2.35 days at a distance of 0.0338 AU. At this proximity, the planet is likely very hot and receives 486 times the stellar flux as Earth. The planet has a Mass of 3.1+1.1
−1.1 M_{🜨} and a bulk density of 4.9+2.0
−1.8 g/cm^{−3}, which is an Earth-like density. The planet has likely a rocky core and a substantial atmospheric layer, composed of volatiles.

The K2-138 system is unique for being the first exoplanet system discovered entirely by citizen scientists.

The K2-138 system, including K2-138b will be studied with CHEOPS to further constrain the mass of the planets with transit-timing variation (TTV).
