= BD+20 594b =

Extrasolar planet in the constellation Aries

BD+20°594 b
Discovery
- Discovered by: Néstor Espinoza, et al.
- Discovery site: Kepler space telescope HARPS (La Silla, Chile)
- Discovery date: 2016
- Detection method: Transit

Designations
- Alternative names: K2-56 b

Orbital characteristics
- Semi-major axis: 0.2226±0.0002
- Eccentricity: 0
- Orbital period (sidereal): 41.68547+0.00097 −0.00094 d
- Inclination: 89.35°±0.49°
- Semi-amplitude: 1.08+0.46 −0.44 m/s
- Star: BD+20°594

Physical characteristics
- Mean radius: 2.23±0.20 R_{🜨}
- Mass: 5.2±2.2 M_{🜨}
- Mean density: 2.6±1.3 g/cm^{3}
- Temperature: 613±4 K (340 °C; 644 °F, equilibrium)

BD+20°594b (also known as K2-56b) is a sub-Neptune exoplanet discovered by the Kepler space telescope in collaboration with the HARPS spectrometer at La Silla in Chile.

== Naming ==
The designation BD+20 594b indicates that the planet circles a star found in the Bonner Durchmusterung catalogue, BD+20°594, the 594th entry in the +20-degree zone (declinations from +19 to +20 degrees), and that it is the first planet discovered orbiting that star.

The designation K2-56b indicates that the planet circles a star catalogued as part of the extended K2 Kepler mission, the 56th one in the catalogue, and that it is the first planet discovered orbiting that star.

== Properties ==
With a radius of 2.2 R_{🜨} and a mass of about 5 M_{🜨}, BD+20 594b is substantially smaller than Neptune, and so can be classified as a sub-Neptune. It was originally estimated to have a mass as large as 16.3 M_{🜨}, which would give it an unusually high density compatible with a rocky composition, classifying it as a possible mega-Earth. It is believed that planets with a radius greater than 1.6 times the Earth's are not usually rocky. However, subsequent research published in 2026 found a significantly lower mass and density.

The planet was discovered on January 28, 2016 by astrophysicist Néstor Espinoza and his team from the Catholic University of Chile, using data from the two-wheeled Kepler mission (K2). It orbits a K-type star 496.08 light years away in the constellation Taurus.
