= K2-187 =

Star in the constellation Cancer

Observation data Epoch J2000 Equinox ICRS
- Constellation: Cancer
- Right ascension: 08^{h} 50^{m} 05.668^{s}
- Declination: +23° 11′ 33.36″
- Apparent magnitude (V): 13.081

Characteristics
- Evolutionary stage: Main sequence
- Spectral type: G7

Astrometry
| Proper motion (μ) | RA: −11.872 mas/yr Dec.: −30.597 mas/yr |
| Parallax (π) | 3.0740±0.0192 mas |
| Distance | 1,061 ± 7 ly (325 ± 2 pc) |

Details
| Mass | 0.93 M_{☉} |
| Radius | 0.92 R_{☉} |
| Luminosity | 0.62 L_{☉} |
| Surface gravity (log g) | 4.48 cgs |
| Temperature | 5,477±50 K |
| Metallicity [Fe/H] | +0.26±0.08 dex |
| Rotation | 20.34 days |
| Rotational velocity (v sin i) | 45 km/s |
| Age | 1.85 Gyr |

Other designations
- K2-187, EPIC 212157262, 2MASS J08500566+2311333, WISE J085005.65+231133.0

Database references
| SIMBAD | data |
| Exoplanet Archive | data |

K2-187, also known as EPIC 212157262, is a Sun-like star in K2 Campaign 5. It is very close in size and temperature to the Sun, and has a system of four exoplanets ranging between 1.4 R_{🜨} and 3.2 R_{🜨}. The innermost planet takes just 18 hours to orbit its star, while the outermost planet orbits every 2 weeks.

== Planetary system ==
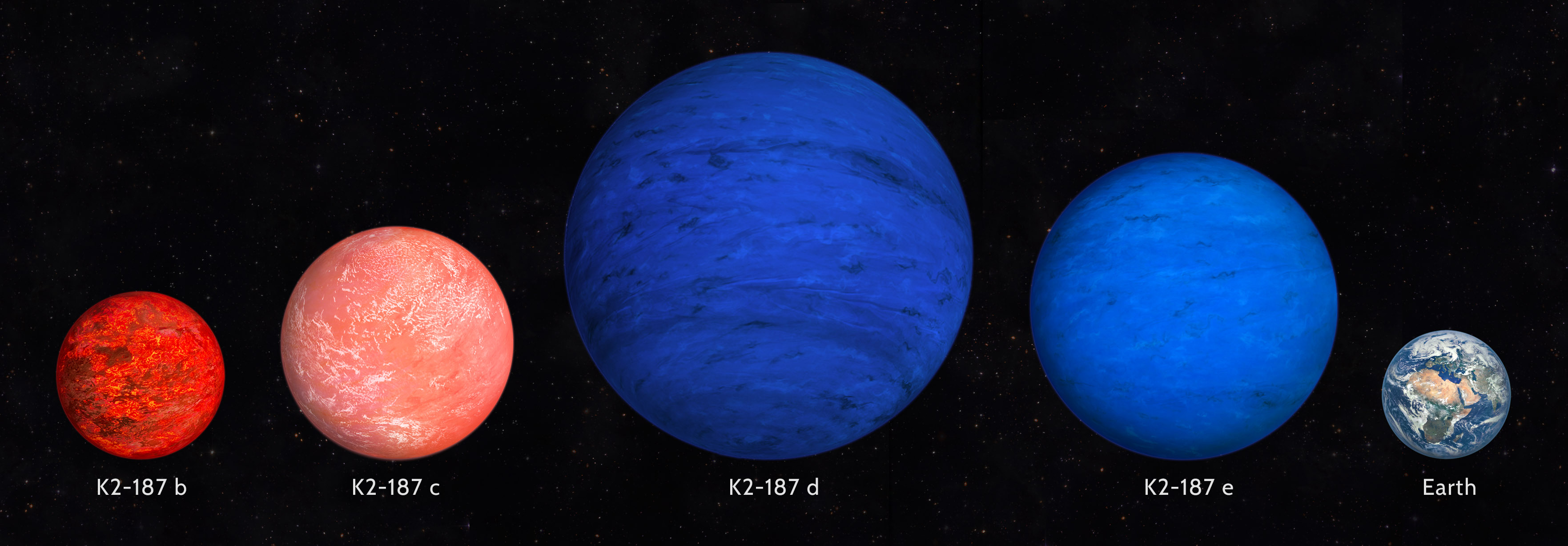
Size comparison of the known planets of K2-187 (artistic concept) with Earth

K2-187 has at least four planets: two super-Earths, one hot Neptune, and one sub-Neptune. All four planets are in near-resonances with each other and are too hot for life.

The K2-187 planetary system
| Companion (in order from star) | Mass | Semimajor axis (AU) | Orbital period (days) | Eccentricity | Inclination (°) | Radius |
|---|---|---|---|---|---|---|
| b | — | 0.016322 | 0.773981+0.000052 −0.000050 | — | 81.930168+5.825258 −11.735217 | 1.30+0.13 −0.13 R_{🜨} |
| c | — | 0.0391185 | 2.871788+0.000256 −0.000257 | — | 86.067367+2.836604 −6.998926 | 1.80+0.14 −0.14 R_{🜨} |
| d | — | 0.0718533 | 7.149079+0.000360 −0.000372 | — | 87.483206+1.886985 −3.903548 | 3.17+0.18 −0.18 R_{🜨} |
| e | — | 0.11036 | 13.608341+0.001661 −0.001580 | — | 88.970197+0.751147 −1.318388 | 2.38+0.18 −0.18 R_{🜨} |
