= List of exoplanets discovered in 2016 =

This is a list of exoplanets discovered in 2016. As of 2026, 2016 is the year with the most discoveries of exoplanets.

For exoplanets detected only by radial velocity, the mass value is actually a lower limit. (See Minimum mass for more information)

== List ==
Name	Mass (M_{J})	Radius (R_{J})	Period (days)	Semi-major axis (AU)	Temp. (K)	Discovery method	Distance (ly)	Host star mass (M_{☉})	Host star temp. (K)	Remarks
2MASS J22362452+4751425 b	12.5			230		imaging	240	0.6	4045	member of AB Doradus moving group
BD+15 2375 b	1.061		153.22	0.576		radial vel.	2520	1.08	4649	
BD+20 594 b	0.05129	0.199	41.6855	0.241	386	transit	496	0.96	5766	Unusually high density planet
EPIC 211901114 b	<5	0.9±0.5	1.6489±0.0001	0.0211±0.0003		transit	592±20	0.46±0.02	3440±65	2% false positive probability, host star also known as CK Cancri
Gliese 536 b	0.01686		8.7076	0.06661		radial vel.	32.7	0.52	3685	
Gliese 676 Ac	6.8		7337	6.6		radial vel.	55	0.71		
Gliese 3998 b	0.00777		2.64977	0.029	740	radial vel.	58.0	0.5	3722	
Gliese 3998 c	0.0197		13.74	0.089	420	radial vel.	58.0	0.5	3722	
HAT-P-65b	0.527	1.89	2.6054552	0.03951	1930	transit	2740	1.21	5835	
HAT-P-66b	0.783	1.59	2.972086	0.04363	1896+66 −42	transit	3020	1.25	6002	
HATS-11b	0.85	1.51	3.6191613	0.04614	1637	transit	2950	1	6060	
HATS-12b	2.38	1.35	3.142833	0.04795	2097	transit	3200	1.49	6408	
HATS-18b	1.98	1.337	0.8378434	0.01761	2060	transit	2100	1.04	5600	
HATS-19b	0.427±0.071	1.66^{+0.27}_{−0.21}	4.569673±0.000010	0.0589±0.0013	1570±110	transit	1860±30	1.303±0.083	5896±77	
HATS-20b	0.273±0.035	0.776±0.055	3.7992969±0.0000079	0.04619±0.00044	1147±36	transit	1610±40	0.910±0.026	5406±49	
HATS-21b	0.332^{+0.040}_{−0.030}	1.123^{+0.147}_{−0.054}	3.5543973±0.0000058	0.04676±0.00038	1284^{+55}_{−31}	transit	954±10	1.080±0.026	5695±67	
HATS-22b	2.74	0.953	4.7228124	0.05025	858	transit	678	0.76	4803	
HATS-23b	1.47	1.86	2.1605156	0.03397	1654	transit	2440	1.12	5780	
HATS-24b	2.44	1.487	1.3484954	0.02547	2067	transit	1700	1.21	6346	
HATS-25b	0.613	1.26	4.2986432	0.05163		transit	1520	0.99	5715	
HATS-26b	0.65	1.75	3.3023881	0.04735		transit	2960	1.3	6071	
HATS-27b	0.53	1.5	4.637038	0.0611		transit	2700	1.42	6438	
HATS-28b	0.672	1.194	3.1810781	0.04131		transit	1700	0.93	5498	
HATS-29b	0.653	1.251	4.6058749	0.05475		transit	1140	1.03	5670	
HATS-30b	0.706	1.175	3.1743516	0.04354		transit	1110	1.09	5943	
HATS-31b	0.88	1.64	3.37796	0.0478	1823	transit	2840	1.27	6050	
HATS-32b	0.92	1.249	2.8126548	0.04024	1437	transit	2740	1.1	5700	
HATS-33b	1.192	1.23	2.5495551	0.03727	1429	transit	830	1.06	5659	
HATS-34b	0.941	1.43	2.1061607	0.03166	1445	transit	1740	0.95	5380	
HATS-35b	1.222	1.464	1.8209993	0.03199	2037	transit	1820	1.32	6300	
HD 3167 b		0.139	0.959628			transit	149	0.86	5261	
HD 3167 c		0.254	29.8454			transit	149	0.86	5261	
HD 5583 b	5.78		139.35	0.53		radial vel.	720	1.01	4830	
HD 9174 b	1.11		1179	2.2		radial vel.	257.4	1.03	5577	
HD 12484 b	2.98		58.83	0.297		radial vel.	167	1.01	5920	
HD 30177 c	7.6		11613	9.89		radial vel.	178.4	0.99	5580	
HD 35759 b	3.76		82.467	0.389		radial vel.	236	1.15	6060	
HD 42618 b	0.04531		149.61	0.554	337	radial vel.	77	1.01	5727	
HD 47366 b	1.75		363.3	1.214		radial vel.	260	1.81	4866	
HD 47366 c	1.86		684.7	1.853		radial vel.	260	1.81	4866	
HD 68402 b	3.07		1103	2.18		radial vel.	250	1.12	5950	
HD 72892 b	5.45		39.475	0.228		radial vel.	237.4	1.02	5688	
HD 86950 b	3.6		1270	2.72		radial vel.	550	1.66	4805	
HD 87646 b	12.4		13.481	0.117		radial vel.	240.0	1.12	5770	Also brown dwarf in the system
HD 95089 c	3.97^{+0.33}_{−0.59}		1860^{+370}_{−570}			radial vel.	42.1±0.59	1.58±0.11	5002±44	
HD 99706 c	5.69^{+1.43}_{−0.96}		1278^{+151}_{−198}			radial vel.	480±4	1.70±0.35	4891±35	
HD 102329 c	1.52^{+0.30}_{−0.25}		1123^{+79}_{−53}			radial vel.	66.97±0.96	3.21±1.28	4745±71	
HD 116029 c	1.27±0.15		907^{+30}_{−29}			radial vel.	37.92±0.18	0.83±0.24	4819±54	
HD 128356 b	0.89		298.2	0.87		radial vel.	84.9	0.65	4875	
HD 133131 Ab	1.42		649	1.44		radial vel.	150	0.95	5799	
HD 133131 Ac	0.42		3568	4.49		radial vel.	150	0.95	5799	
HD 133131 Bb	2.5		5769	6.15		radial vel.	150	0.93	5805	
HD 143105 b	1.21		2.1974	0.0379		radial vel.	159	1.51	6380	
HD 147873 b	5.14		116.596	0.522		radial vel.	342.2	1.38	5972	
HD 147873 c	2.3		491.54	1.36		radial vel.	342.2	1.38	5972	
HD 156279 c	8.60^{+0.50}_{−0.55}		4191^{+270}_{−310}			radial vel.	119.109±0.011	0.95±0.08	5453±40	
HD 164922 c	0.04059		75.765	0.3351	400	radial vel.	72.2	0.87	5293	
HD 165155 b	2.89		434.5	1.13		radial vel.	211.9	1.02	5426	
HD 191806 b	8.52		1606.3	2.8		radial vel.	239.6	1.14	6010	
HD 214823 b	19.2		1877	3.18		radial vel.	317.9	1.22	6215	
HD 219828 c	15.1		4791	5.96		radial vel.	254	1.23	5891	
HD 220842 b	3.18		218.47	0.74		radial vel.	204	1.13	5960	
HD 221585 b	1.61		1173	2.306		radial vel.	174.8	1.19	5620	
HD 222076 b	1.56		871	1.83		radial vel.	272	1.07	4806	
HD 224538 b	5.97		1189.1	2.28		radial vel.	253.6	1.34	6097	
HD 11343 b	5.5		1560.2	2.8		radial vel.	550.0	1.17	4670	Host star also known as HIP 8541
HIP 41378 b		0.259	15.5712			transit	378.8	1.15	6199	
HIP 41378 c		0.228	31.6978			transit	378.8	1.15	6199	
HIP 41378 d		0.353	156			transit	378.8	1.15	6199	
HIP 41378 e		0.492	131			transit	378.8	1.15	6199	
HIP 41378 f		0.91	324			transit	378.8	1.15	6199	Possible ring system
HIP 65407 b	0.428		28.125	0.177		radial vel.	181	0.93	5460	
HIP 65407 c	0.784		67.3	0.316		radial vel.	181	0.93	5460	
HIP 67537 b	11.1		2556.5	4.91		radial vel.		2.41	4985	Eccentric orbit, host star also known as HD 120457
HD 135760 b	2.4		822.3	2.1		radial vel.	298.4	1.74	4850	Host star also known as HIP 74890
HIP 109384 b	1.56		499.48	1.134		radial vel.	183	0.78	5180	
HIP 109600 b	2.68		232.08	0.706		radial vel.	191	0.87	5530	
HR 2562 b	30	1.11		20.3		imaging	109.7	1.3		
K2-8c		0.215	5.06416	0.0532	631	transit		0.78	4870	
K2-19d	0.044	0.102	2.50856	0.0344	1252	transit	950	0.93	5430	
K2-24b	0.062	0.52	20.88508	0.1542	709	transit	590	1.12	5743	
K2-24c	0.082	0.723	42.36342	0.2471	560	transit	590	1.12	5743	
K2-26b		0.238	14.5665	0.0962		transit	300	0.56	3785	
K2-27b	0.09722	0.4	6.771315	0.06702		transit		0.87	5248	
K2-29b	0.73	1.19	3.2588321	0.04217	1171	transit	600	0.94	5358	
K2-30b	0.579	1.039	4.098503	0.04839	1185	transit	910	0.9	5425	
K2-31b	1.774	1.06	1.25785	0.022		transit		0.91	5280	
K2-32b	0.05191	0.458	8.99213	0.08036		transit		0.86	5275	
K2-32c	0.03807	0.269	20.6602	0.1399		transit		0.86	5275	
K2-32d	0.03241	0.306	31.7154	0.1862		transit		0.86	5275	
K2-33b	3.7	0.45	5.424865			transit	470	0.56	3540	
K2-34b	1.76	1.35	2.995607	0.04419	1742	transit	1230	1.28	6132	
K2-35b		0.125	2.39984	0.032		transit		0.76	4680	
K2-35c		0.186	5.60912	0.0564		transit		0.76	4680	
K2-36b		0.118	1.42266	0.023		transit		0.8	4924	
K2-36c		0.25	5.34059	0.0555		transit		0.8	4924	
K2-37b		0.144	4.44117	0.0511		transit		0.9	5413	
K2-37c		0.245	6.42904	0.0654		transit		0.9	5413	
K2-37d		0.244	14.09189	0.1103		transit		0.9	5413	
K2-38b	0.03776	0.138	4.01593	0.0506		transit	631±9	1.03^{+0.04}_{−0.02}	5731±66	Also candidate planet K2-38d in system not coplanar with two transiting planets
K2-38c	0.03115	0.216	10.56103	0.0964		transit	631±9	1.03^{+0.04}_{−0.02}	5731±66	Also candidate planet K2-38d in system not coplanar with two transiting planets
K2-39b	0.12522	0.509	4.60497	0.0574		transit	972.5	1.19	4912	
K2-42b		0.192	6.68796	0.0617		transit		0.7	4613	
K2-43b		0.368	3.47114	0.03784		transit		0.6	3939	
K2-44b		0.243	5.65688	0.0651		transit		1.15	5912	
K2-45b		0.599	1.7292684	0.0224		transit		0.5	4103	
K2-46b		0.183	19.1541	0.13821		transit		0.96	6256	
K2-47b		0.169	31.6372	0.1779		transit		0.75	5054	
K2-48b		0.2	20.5065	0.1344		transit		0.77	4899	
K2-49b		0.172	2.77065	0.0309		transit		0.51	4175	
K2-50b		0.142	8.7529	0.0705		transit		0.61	4326	
K2-52b		0.99	3.53482	0.0485		transit		1.21	6113	
K2-53b		0.223	12.2054	0.0975		transit		0.83	5269	
K2-54b		0.103	9.7843	0.0671		transit		0.42	3798	
K2-55b		0.341	2.849258	0.03486		transit		0.7	4456	
K2-57b		0.187	9.0063	0.0746		transit		0.68	4434	
K2-58b		0.239	7.05254	0.0692		transit		0.89	5413	
K2-58c		0.145	2.53726	0.035		transit		0.89	5413	
K2-58d		0.153	22.8827	0.1517		transit		0.89	5413	
K2-59b		0.215	20.6921	0.1354		transit		0.77	5055	
K2-59c		0.205	11.2954	0.0905		transit		0.77	5055	
K2-60b	0.426	0.683	3.00265	0.045	1400	transit		0.97	5500	
K2-61b		0.221	2.57302	0.0392		transit		1.21	6293	
K2-62b		0.191	6.67202	0.0636		transit		0.77	4880	
K2-62c		0.191	16.1966	0.1148		transit		0.77	4880	
K2-63b		0.287	20.257	0.1627		transit	1710	1.4	6771	
K2-64b		0.185	6.53044	0.0619		transit		0.74	5312	
K2-65b		0.141	12.6475	0.1014		transit	254.6	0.87	5213	
K2-66b		0.222	5.06965	0.06069		transit		1.16	5958	
K2-68b		0.141	8.05428	0.0708		transit		0.73	4746	
K2-69b		0.207	7.06599	0.0591		transit		0.55	4127	
K2-70b		0.258	13.97896	0.1112		transit		0.94	5622	
K2-71b		0.192	6.98541	0.0559		transit		0.48	4006	
K2-72b		0.067	5.57739	0.037		transit	217	0.22	3497	
K2-72c		0.077	15.1871	0.0722		transit	217	0.22	3497	Potentially habitable exoplanet
K2-72d		0.065	7.7599	0.0461		transit	217	0.22	3497	
K2-72e		0.073	24.1669	0.098		transit	217	0.22	3497	Potentially habitable exoplanet
K2-73b		0.219	7.49543	0.07619		transit		1.05	5922	
K2-74b		0.206	19.5666	0.1402		transit		0.96	6060	
K2-75b		0.238	7.8142	0.081		transit		1.16	5995	
K2-75c		0.247	18.311	0.1429		transit		1.16	5995	
K2-77b	1.9	0.205	8.199796			transit	460	0.8	4970	
K2-79b	0.0371±0.0113	0.365±0.015	10.99573	0.0987		transit		1.06	5926	
K2-80b		0.179	19.0918	0.135		transit		0.9	5441	
K2-80c		0.131	5.605	0.0596		transit		0.9	5441	
K2-81b		0.162	6.10224	0.0579		transit		0.7	4530	
K2-83b		0.111	2.74697	0.03014		transit		0.48	3910	
K2-83c		0.132	9.99767	0.07131		transit		0.48	3910	
K2-84b		0.215	6.4215	0.0665		transit		0.95	5652	
K2-84c		0.181	27.86	0.1768		transit		0.95	5652	
K2-85b		0.09	0.684533	0.01263		transit		0.57	4268	
K2-86b		0.175	8.77683	0.077		transit		0.79	5482	
K2-87b		0.41	9.72739	0.0876		transit		0.95	5406	
K2-88b		0.11	4.6122	0.0345		transit		0.26	3537	
K2-89b		0.055	1.096026	0.01462		transit		0.35	3691	
K2-90b		0.182	13.7311	0.0926		transit		0.56	4136	
K2-90c		0.091	2.90032	0.0328		transit		0.56	4136	
K2-91b		0.098	1.419549	0.0164		transit		0.29	3622	
K2-93b		0.228		0.138		transit	360	1.2	6200	
K2-93c		0.259		0.22		transit	360	1.2	6200	
K2-95b	0.03458	0.31	10.13389	0.0653		transit	560	0.36	3471	
K2-97b	0.48±0.07	1.31±0.11	8.4061			transit	2490	1.16	4790	
K2-98b	0.10131	0.384	10.13675	0.0943		transit	1420	1.07	6120	
K2-99b	0.97	1.06±0.01	18.249	0.159		transit	1980	1.6	5990	
K2-100b		0.312	1.673916			transit	592	1.18	6120	
K2-101b		0.178	14.677286			transit	592	0.8	4819	
K2-102b		0.116	9.915615			transit	592	0.77	4695	
K2-103b		0.196	21.169619			transit	592	0.61	3880	Host star (also known as EPIC 211822797), belongs to Beehive Cluster
K2-104b		0.17	1.97419			transit	592	0.51	3660	
K2-107b	0.84	1.44	3.31392	0.048		transit		1.3	6030	
K2-110b	0.0525	0.2312	13.86375	0.1021	640	transit	385	0.74	5010	
K2-113b	1.29	0.930	5.817608	0.0558	1178	transit	1800	1.01	5627	
KELT-11b	0.195±0.019	1.3^{+0.18}_{−0.12}	4.736529^{+0.000068}_{−0.000059}	0.06229^{+0.00088}_{−0.00076}	1712	transit	320±16	1.438^{+0.061}_{−0.052}	5370±51	
KELT-12b	0.950	1.78	5.031623	0.06708	1800	transit		1.59	6279	
KELT-16b	2.75	1.415	0.9689951	0.02044		transit	1289.2	1.21	6236	
KELT-17b	1.31	1.525	3.0801716	0.04881	2087	transit	680	1.64	7454	
KIC 7917485 b	11.8		840	2.03		timing		1.63	7067	
Kepler-20g	0.0628		34.94	0.2055		radial vel.	950	0.95	5495	
Kepler-46d		0.146	6.766589	0.067		transit	2790	0.9	5309	
Kepler-56d	5.61±0.38		1002±5	2.16±0.08		radial vel.	3060±80	1.32	4840	
Kepler-80f		0.108	0.9867873	0.0175		transit	1160	0.73	4540	
Kepler-132e		0.105	110.2869374			transit	900±70		6003	
Kepler-148d		0.774	51.84688575			transit	2630±50		5272	
Kepler-154d		0.343	20.54981883			transit	3060±50	0.89	5690	
Kepler-154e		0.134	3.93276465			transit	3060±50	0.89	5690	
Kepler-154f		0.134	9.91935684			transit	3060±50	0.89	5690	
Kepler-157d		0.13	7.02573474			transit	2580±30		5774	
Kepler-166d		0.154	1.55400393			transit	2000±20		5413	
Kepler-167d		0.107	21.803855	0.1405	536	transit	1100	0.77	4890	
Kepler-167e		0.906	1071.23228	1.89	131	transit	1100	0.77	4890	
Kepler-176e		0.129	51.16579			transit	1740±19		5232	
Kepler-191d		0.203	5.94504102			transit	1970±20	0.85	5282	
Kepler-192d		0.091	6.47027579			transit	2160±20		5479	
Kepler-198d		0.136	1.31184443			transit	1638±14	0.93	5574	
Kepler-217d		0.118	3.88689525			transit	3720±50		6171	
Kepler-218d		0.237	124.5244647			transit	2180±20		5502	
Kepler-245e		0.156	3.21982106			transit	2870±80	0.8	5100	
Kepler-255d		0.118	1.04562266			transit	3530±100	0.97	5573	
Kepler-271d		0.059	5.24972541			transit	1334±12		5524	
Kepler-304e		0.107	1.49914695			transit	1435±17	0.8	4731	
Kepler-342e		0.079	1.64422461			transit	2600±30	1.13	6175	
Kepler-351d		0.243	142.544247			transit	3640±140	0.89	5643	
Kepler-398d		0.079	6.83437001			transit	581.4±1.8		4493	
Kepler-401d		0.203	184.256405			transit	3230±50		6117	
Kepler-403d		0.127	13.61159129			transit	2800±50		6090	
Kepler-411c		0.292	7.83442788			transit	503.5±1.5	0.83	4974	
Kepler-436c		0.208	16.79713874			transit	2020	0.73	4651	
Kepler-461b		0.23	8.31378306			transit	1530	0.98	5634	
Kepler-462b		0.336	84.6879808			transit	2390	1.59	7070	
Kepler-463b		0.272	8.98101683			transit	1100	0.87	5661	
Kepler-464b		0.294	7.25696522			transit	2130	1.21	5933	
Kepler-465b		0.263	9.94067247			transit	1910	1.23	6310	
Kepler-466b		0.254	51.07926307			transit	1420	1.04	5927	
Kepler-466c		0.112	3.70921385			transit	1420	1.04	5927	
Kepler-467b		0.201	24.99324193			transit	1490	1.05	5809	
Kepler-468b		1.19	38.47875707			transit	1550	0.96	5498	
Kepler-471b		1.335	5.01423457			transit	4480	1.49	6733	
Kepler-472b		0.287	4.17625551			transit	980	0.85	4996	
Kepler-473b		0.364	14.55731705			transit	2090	1.06	5816	
Kepler-474b		0.273	5.66067294			transit	1850	0.99	5785	
Kepler-475b		0.222	3.10550819			transit	910	0.86	5009	
Kepler-476b		0.275	14.00640607			transit	2240	1.03	5837	
Kepler-477b		0.185	11.11990653			transit	1200	0.87	5240	
Kepler-478b		0.242	13.2217576			transit	1400	0.85	5210	
Kepler-479b		0.189	12.49341307			transit	1210	0.86	5247	
Kepler-480b		0.248	4.9195838			transit	2630	1.25	6322	
Kepler-481b		0.223	10.06082567			transit	2330	1.01	5802	
Kepler-482b		0.211	56.35418576			transit	950	0.75	4871	
Kepler-483b		0.286	30.229104			transit	3110	1.28	6346	
Kepler-484b		0.203	10.04556931			transit	1230	0.96	5668	
Kepler-485b		1.286	3.2432598			transit	3830	1.07	5958	
Kepler-487b		1.019	15.3587684			transit	2720	0.91	5444	
Kepler-487c		0.239	38.6519976			transit	2720	0.91	5444	
Kepler-489b		0.689	17.27629612			transit	1240	0.82	5014	
Kepler-490b		1.039	3.26869515			transit	4070	1.08	6045	
Kepler-491b		0.796	4.22538451			transit	2140	1.04	5582	
Kepler-493b		1.35	3.00387658			transit	6330	1.36	6457	
Kepler-495b		0.467	3.41303622			transit	2100	0.86	5346	
Kepler-496b		0.207	8.30864937			transit	2140	0.86	5293	
Kepler-497b		0.539	3.57320367			transit	3500	1.09	5834	
Kepler-498b		0.27	9.61375356			transit	2430	0.98	5744	
Kepler-499b		0.194	5.63252845			transit	1710	0.87	5312	
Kepler-500b		0.23	8.5083244			transit	2440	1.02	5813	
Kepler-501b		0.384	5.64067757			transit	3410	1.03	5904	
Kepler-502b		0.426	4.28686431			transit	4670	1.15	6125	
Kepler-504b		0.142	9.54927542			transit	240	0.33	3519	
Kepler-505b		0.232	27.52197994			transit	720	0.55	3931	
Kepler-506b		0.244	6.8834055			transit	750	1.19	6236	
Kepler-507b		0.116	3.56809693			transit	1300	1.16	6113	
Kepler-508b		0.146	25.30889748			transit	1060	1.16	6025	
Kepler-509b		0.222	41.74600392			transit	1110	1.1	6060	
Kepler-510b		0.22	19.55659418			transit	1230	0.91	5746	
Kepler-511b		0.567	296.637865			transit	1460	1	5770	
Kepler-512b		0.24	34.43587975			transit	1730	1.17	5997	
Kepler-513b		0.196	28.86235584			transit	1520	1.02	5849	
Kepler-514b		0.153	5.65179605			transit	1590	1.28	6106	
Kepler-515b		0.13	19.96371318			transit	830	0.9	5293	
Kepler-516b		0.512	24.85462415			transit	2530	1.62	7099	
Kepler-517b		0.238	60.92832271			transit	930	0.95	5690	
Kepler-518b		0.188	8.51203588			transit	1060	0.96	5842	
Kepler-519b		0.187	24.3078946			transit	760	0.89	5260	
Kepler-520b		0.148	19.67416124			transit	1600	1.1	6112	
Kepler-520c		0.095	5.21104261			transit	1600	1.1	6112	
Kepler-521b		0.284	22.20813214			transit	2400	1.34	6406	
Kepler-522b		0.616	38.58422849			transit	2440	1.54	6392	
Kepler-523b		0.175	5.83598311			transit	880	0.93	5515	
Kepler-524b		0.17	7.97419807			transit	2400	1.09	6014	
Kepler-524c		0.086	1.88897906			transit	2400	1.09	6014	
Kepler-525b		0.235	18.68404933			transit	1850	0.95	5573	
Kepler-526b		0.178	5.45849832			transit	1640	1.15	5894	
Kepler-527b		0.253	13.28535633			transit	2940	1.28	6388	
Kepler-528b		0.186	19.78297415			transit	2320	1.01	5807	
Kepler-529b		0.166	1.98035766			transit	2570	1.07	6087	
Kepler-529c		0.178	12.8345022			transit	2570	1.07	6087	
Kepler-530b		0.269	39.30941904			transit	1510	0.97	5697	
Kepler-531b		0.248	29.88485741			transit	830	0.78	4893	
Kepler-532b		0.229	12.92491623			transit	1060	0.87	5192	
Kepler-533b		0.302	28.51120525			transit	990	0.78	4758	
Kepler-534b		0.2	15.95994513			transit	1540	1.05	5884	
Kepler-535b		0.211	4.90332155			transit	2210	1.18	6123	
Kepler-536b		0.277	1.8270823			transit	1450	0.92	5524	
Kepler-537b		0.126	3.24755522			transit	1520	1.07	5763	
Kepler-538b		0.202	81.73780699			transit	540	0.96	5650	
Kepler-539b	0.97	0.747	125.63243	0.4988		transit	1020	1.05	5820	
Kepler-539c	2.4		1000	2.42		transit	1020	1.05	5820	
Kepler-540b		0.242	172.7049784			transit	1100	1.02	5946	
Kepler-541b		0.3	5.08005848			transit	3300	1.41	6166	
Kepler-542b		0.14	13.14497566			transit	1430	0.93	5526	
Kepler-543b		0.223	13.89961966			transit	690	0.7	4671	
Kepler-544b		0.189	21.41616926			transit	2600	1.16	6206	
Kepler-545b		0.24	13.24934059			transit	2710	1.04	5882	
Kepler-546b		0.624	4.14702026			transit	2920	1.11	5967	
Kepler-547b		0.357	6.01038429			transit	1180	0.78	4828	
Kepler-548b		1.07	4.45419434			transit	2530	0.93	5535	
Kepler-549b		0.229	42.9495649			transit	2110	0.88	5360	
Kepler-549c		0.261	117.040498			transit	2110	0.88	5360	
Kepler-550b		0.394	8.60010411			transit	1840	0.87	5322	
Kepler-551b		0.244	12.3764661			transit	1020	0.65	4286	
Kepler-552b		0.352	5.26341577			transit	2720	1.03	5863	
Kepler-553b		0.413	4.03046804			transit	2360	0.92	5266	
Kepler-553c		0.999	328.2399546			transit	2360	0.92	5266	
Kepler-554b		0.383	1.90220856			transit	2090	0.93	5447	
Kepler-555b		0.252	16.21775407			transit	2520	1.03	5894	
Kepler-556b		0.2	11.72292176			transit	2380	1	5740	
Kepler-557b		0.238	3.70598955			transit	3670	1.11	6068	
Kepler-558b		0.211	29.00790538			transit	2130	0.85	5242	
Kepler-559b		0.322	17.58752333			transit	2590	0.96	5630	
Kepler-560b		0.153	18.47764449			transit	290	0.34	3556	Potentially habitable exoplanet
Kepler-561b		0.621	58.3620495			transit	2180	0.96	5646	
Kepler-561c		0.239	5.35016198			transit	2180	0.96	5646	
Kepler-562b		0.465	18.00931444			transit	2680	0.93	5575	
Kepler-563b		0.276	22.18432708			transit	1820	0.8	5066	
Kepler-564b		0.413	3.75083228			transit	2700	0.95	5626	
Kepler-565b		0.325	4.24374723			transit	3400	0.98	5735	
Kepler-566b		0.192	18.42794624			transit	2050	0.83	5132	
Kepler-567b		0.201	16.54297375			transit	1850	0.84	5148	
Kepler-568b		0.202	11.02347475			transit	410	0.55	3768	
Kepler-569b		0.282	34.18890521			transit	2100	0.95	5616	
Kepler-570b		0.219	4.301662			transit	2090	0.93	5496	
Kepler-571b		0.236	4.79859939			transit	2470	0.93	5527	
Kepler-572b		0.23	17.20523483			transit	1740	0.83	5212	
Kepler-573b		0.249	22.18329658			transit	2470	0.99	5746	
Kepler-574b		0.213	7.65880414			transit	2440	0.95	5612	
Kepler-575b		0.213	9.37891944			transit	2780	0.97	5710	
Kepler-576b		0.292	29.91136794			transit	2280	0.99	5672	
Kepler-577b		0.227	25.69578251			transit	1790	0.78	4984	
Kepler-578b		0.178	1.6168837			transit	1850	0.87	5334	
Kepler-579b		0.178	9.66857723			transit	2160	0.99	5636	
Kepler-580b		0.229	8.22241966			transit	1090	0.67	4298	
Kepler-581b		0.235	40.6069821			transit	2720	1	5772	
Kepler-582b		0.328	18.49235668			transit	2450	0.93	5564	
Kepler-583b		0.203	6.5100253			transit	2630	0.94	5523	
Kepler-584b		0.376	35.1810304			transit	4710	1.17	6195	
Kepler-585b		0.252	2.75235975			transit	1970	0.96	5593	
Kepler-586b		0.249	2.10472218			transit	2310	0.94	5575	
Kepler-587b		0.199	10.94027841			transit	2780	0.92	5549	
Kepler-588b		0.235	4.22162536			transit	3170	1.01	5835	
Kepler-589b		0.203	16.54964934			transit	2100	0.88	5296	
Kepler-590b		0.359	5.85296257			transit	3220	1.1	6000	
Kepler-591b		0.302	81.1694299			transit	2590	0.97	5677	
Kepler-592b		0.213	2.82019241			transit	3370	1.04	5913	
Kepler-593b		0.256	21.21708973			transit	3310	1.08	5967	
Kepler-594b		0.194	13.64618192			transit	2420	0.91	5485	
Kepler-595b		0.34	25.30292332			transit	2080	0.87	5247	
Kepler-596b		0.309	21.30022655			transit	3530	1.21	6267	
Kepler-597b		0.211	13.02365861			transit	2200	0.97	5683	
Kepler-598b		0.134	3.70175428			transit	2240	0.87	5307	
Kepler-599b		0.253	15.65562652			transit	2050	0.83	5127	
Kepler-600b		0.259	23.67517607			transit	2040	0.84	5279	
Kepler-601b		0.17	5.37886844			transit	1400	0.85	5160	
Kepler-602b		0.186	15.28469497			transit	3170	1.08	6062	
Kepler-603b		0.236	21.05358596			transit	3150	1.01	5808	
Kepler-603c		0.58	127.9075774			transit	3150	1.01	5808	
Kepler-603d		0.118	6.2171292			transit	3150	1.01	5808	
Kepler-604b		0.231	25.85501786			transit	3200	1.02	5890	
Kepler-605b		0.128	3.38353807			transit	1900	0.91	5462	
Kepler-605c		0.077	2.35895152			transit	1900	0.91	5462	
Kepler-606b		0.295	24.31575992			transit	3940	1.13	6161	
Kepler-607b		0.078	0.6381632			transit	1600	0.84	5196	
Kepler-608b		0.325	6.41251504			transit	3020	1	5820	
Kepler-609b		0.299	6.52121067			transit	3730	1.09	5971	
Kepler-610b		0.374	6.99692655			transit	3630	1.1	5943	
Kepler-610c		0.294	151.86392			transit	3630	1.1	5943	
Kepler-611b		0.147	2.4370333			transit	2950	1.01	5761	
Kepler-612b		0.253	3.72215641			transit	3040	0.98	5693	
Kepler-613b		0.204	15.77979614			transit	2820	0.98	5723	
Kepler-614b		0.213	14.03491514			transit	1860	0.85	5268	
Kepler-615b		0.155	10.35584657			transit	1100	0.73	4655	
Kepler-616b		0.217	9.99761851			transit	3320	0.98	5753	
Kepler-616c		0.304	90.4113556			transit	3320	0.98	5753	
Kepler-617b		0.118	1.68269615			transit	490	0.51	3712	
Kepler-618b		0.232	3.59576964			transit	3640	1.05	5860	
Kepler-619b		0.282	5.4042722			transit	3620	1.09	5980	
Kepler-619c		0.151	1.20846503			transit	3620	1.09	5980	
Kepler-620b		0.296	12.91375431			transit	4050	1.15	6155	
Kepler-621b		0.205	2.62811375			transit	1270	0.72	4521	
Kepler-622b		0.19	14.28226676			transit	840	0.64	4201	
Kepler-623b		0.269	9.07097734			transit	2650	0.9	5443	
Kepler-624b		0.206	14.58649607			transit	2380	1.1	6117	
Kepler-625b		0.178	7.75192492			transit	1640	1.04	5789	
Kepler-625c		0.094	4.1653651			transit	1640	1.04	5789	
Kepler-626b		0.204	14.48585199			transit	2300	1.01	5813	
Kepler-627b		0.333	40.6994443			transit	3730	1.3	6424	
Kepler-629b		0.123	7.2385854			transit	1250	0.93	5444	
Kepler-630b		0.284	161.4743937			transit	2140	1.02	5829	
Kepler-631b		0.259	17.97979059			transit	2750	1.24	6185	
Kepler-632b		0.197	30.99660733			transit	1140	0.91	5322	
Kepler-633b		0.145	8.50340718			transit	2070	1.02	5899	
Kepler-634b		0.169	5.16950177			transit	2470	1.03	6075	
Kepler-635b		0.236	23.44971004			transit	2690	1.33	6174	
Kepler-636b		0.397	16.08066115			transit	1110	0.85	5203	
Kepler-637b		0.424	23.20584623			transit	5140	1.64	6096	
Kepler-638b		0.163	6.07972888			transit	1390	0.88	5382	
Kepler-639b		0.212	10.21420496			transit	2200	1.14	5896	
Kepler-640b		0.228	22.24813967			transit	1750	1.01	5653	
Kepler-641b		0.165	9.48961571			transit	2200	1.02	5713	
Kepler-642b		0.259	4.41745855			transit	3330	1.4	6570	
Kepler-643b		0.906	16.33889626			transit	3360	1	4908	
Kepler-644b		0.281	3.1739171			transit	4610	1.49	6747	
Kepler-645b		0.187	3.27582262			transit	2940	1.13	6170	
Kepler-646b		0.178	15.87364565			transit	1670	0.93	5634	
Kepler-647b		0.104	16.2254649			transit	2570	1.03	6020	
Kepler-648b		0.287	17.4211749			transit	2170	1.05	5741	
Kepler-649b		0.202	29.90722674			transit	1710	0.97	5871	
Kepler-650b		0.264	3.03214559			transit	2630	1.08	5849	
Kepler-651b		0.211	21.38521506			transit	1750	0.92	5522	
Kepler-652b		0.222	4.18200253			transit	1380	0.97	5490	
Kepler-653b		0.174	14.70748976			transit	1930	1.02	5665	
Kepler-653c		0.07	0.90037648			transit	1930	1.02	5665	
Kepler-654b		0.185	13.72465129			transit	2160	1.04	5865	
Kepler-655b		0.242	46.4063358			transit	2550	1.15	6170	
Kepler-656b		0.278	1.26025909			transit	2830	0.86	5281	
Kepler-657b		0.314	24.54350418			transit	4060	1.01	5808	
Kepler-658b		0.145	1.28707676			transit	1110	0.63	4103	
Kepler-659b		0.223	17.671796			transit	2240	0.79	4870	
Kepler-660b		0.229	9.27358194			transit	1840	0.75	4779	
Kepler-661b		0.274	6.02930132			transit	1820	0.7	4483	
Kepler-662b		0.194	21.67697486			transit	2090	0.79	4897	
Kepler-663b		0.232	4.99678284			transit	3400	0.86	5264	
Kepler-664b		0.237	2.52559332			transit	4520	1.01	5754	
Kepler-665b		0.232	16.01310205			transit	2120	0.79	4913	
Kepler-666b		0.214	4.49876092			transit	4300	1.03	5887	
Kepler-667b		0.422	41.43962808			transit	2960	0.91	5327	
Kepler-668b		0.241	8.35390639			transit	2860	0.87	5352	
Kepler-669b		0.431	4.12554687			transit	5800	1.15	6038	
Kepler-670b		1.176	2.81650485			transit	3200	0.99	5709	
Kepler-671b		0.24	4.28095859			transit	3710	0.97	5624	
Kepler-672b		0.223	38.3774623			transit	3300	0.95	5627	
Kepler-673b		0.583	3.72873109			transit	3190	0.88	5355	
Kepler-674b		0.151	2.24338185			transit	980	0.6	4192	
Kepler-675b		0.218	2.33743801			transit	2120	0.79	4945	
Kepler-676b		0.271	11.59822172			transit	790	0.51	3701	
Kepler-677b		0.48	6.57531678			transit	3800	1	5723	
Kepler-678b		0.459	7.27503724			transit	2850	0.94	5520	
Kepler-679b		0.269	12.39358604			transit	3160	0.87	5403	
Kepler-680b		0.216	3.68992629			transit	4380	1.08	5890	
Kepler-681b		0.275	26.39435646			transit	2170	0.8	5021	
Kepler-682b		0.658	12.61190667			transit	3100	0.92	5559	
Kepler-683b		0.176	2.53918318			transit	3180	0.96	5703	
Kepler-684b		0.3	6.77030201			transit	3480	0.89	5493	
Kepler-685b		0.944	1.6255222			transit	3730	1.11	5963	
Kepler-686b		1.084	1.59474546			transit	3920	0.94	5649	
Kepler-687b		0.314	20.50586978			transit	2050	0.77	4841	
Kepler-688b		0.871	3.89593684			transit	4070	0.98	5715	
Kepler-689b		0.258	22.36656079			transit	3410	0.91	5518	
Kepler-690b		0.531	7.74809437			transit	5390	1.11	5913	
Kepler-691b		0.186	8.114379			transit	780	0.53	3715	
Kepler-692b		0.277	21.81293494			transit	3300	0.9	5440	
Kepler-693b		0.908	15.37563332			transit	3270	0.76	4881	
Kepler-694b		0.25	6.36584161			transit	3340	0.97	5700	
Kepler-695b		0.822	3.04033042			transit	2000	0.84	5181	
Kepler-696b		0.548	4.19042557			transit	4190	1.06	5903	
Kepler-697b		0.368	3.70987065			transit	3560	0.92	5513	
Kepler-698b		0.328	16.32976218			transit	3700	0.94	5612	
Kepler-700b		0.534	80.8720639			transit	3460	0.98	5692	
Kepler-701b		0.253	10.35533177			transit	2460	0.88	5343	
Kepler-702b		0.818	10.52629406			transit	2910	0.9	5419	
Kepler-703b		0.732	4.58352176			transit	4830	1.18	6185	
Kepler-704b		0.233	3.76182115			transit	3440	0.97	5616	
Kepler-705b		0.188	56.0560538			transit	820	0.53	3722	Potentially habitable exoplanet
Kepler-707b		0.119	2.23749275			transit	2040	0.8	5099	
Kepler-708b		0.261	3.16789194			transit	4050	0.97	5692	
Kepler-709b		0.261	16.08524954			transit	2180	0.8	5071	
Kepler-710b		0.168	4.34728553			transit	3000	0.94	5611	
Kepler-711b		0.304	23.58914398			transit	2170	0.84	5222	
Kepler-712b		0.304	21.02247699			transit	3080	0.84	5148	
Kepler-712c		0.433	226.89047			transit	3080	0.84	5148	
Kepler-713b		0.221	7.411141			transit	3270	0.98	5785	
Kepler-714b		0.863	8.09888799			transit	4800	1.09	5995	
Kepler-715b		0.335	10.00652995			transit	3960	1.04	5871	
Kepler-716b		0.259	10.37168453			transit	2200	0.83	5099	
Kepler-717b		0.216	4.40840023			transit	3670	0.88	5485	
Kepler-718b		1.477	2.0523499			transit	5000	1.18	6191	
Kepler-719b		0.76	5.00731778			transit	4650	0.99	5777	
Kepler-720b		0.75	4.70832654			transit	2900	0.95	5618	
Kepler-721b		0.236	5.39202539			transit	2770	0.82	5075	
Kepler-722b		0.235	4.09357325			transit	4480	1.03	5863	
Kepler-722c		0.252	105.144749			transit	4480	1.03	5863	
Kepler-723b		1.088	4.08227507			transit	3150	0.92	5539	
Kepler-724b		0.294	3.31494634			transit	2810	0.9	5437	
Kepler-725b		0.948	39.64317811			transit	2540	0.88	5363	
Kepler-726b		0.291	21.80451088			transit	2730	0.88	5452	
Kepler-727b		0.226	5.15448442			transit	2910	0.89	5441	
Kepler-728b		0.298	5.74347727			transit	4030	0.95	5660	
Kepler-729b		0.319	3.16635371			transit	4150	0.94	5633	
Kepler-730b		0.822	6.49168426			transit	4750	1	5726	
Kepler-731b		1.238	3.85560355			transit	4280	1.03	5849	
Kepler-732b		0.194	9.46781405			transit	490	0.49	3631	
Kepler-732c		0.113	0.89304124			transit	490	0.49	3631	
Kepler-733b		0.252	20.83424726			transit	3200	0.9	5418	
Kepler-734b		0.318	6.10485286			transit	1800	0.85	5326	
Kepler-735b		0.263	11.51516988			transit	2600	0.85	5107	
Kepler-736b		0.261	3.60147201			transit	3280	0.86	5217	
Kepler-737b		0.175	28.59915399			transit	640	0.51	3813	
Kepler-738b		0.223	24.58721573			transit	3240	0.86	5327	
Kepler-739b		0.296	12.53248465			transit	3680	0.93	5601	
Kepler-740b		0.408	3.58410122			transit	4120	0.91	5438	
Kepler-741b		0.265	7.03902374			transit	5000	1.16	6129	
Kepler-742b		0.289	8.36086824			transit	1630	0.76	4642	
Kepler-743b		0.108	3.17926292			transit	840	0.94	5486	
Kepler-744b		0.145	12.06222443			transit	1590	0.94	5594	
Kepler-745b		0.193	9.93143556			transit	3910	1.04	5849	
Kepler-746b		0.099	3.48159251			transit	1500	0.91	5418	
Kepler-747b		0.47	35.61760587			transit	2790	0.82	5096	May not be a planet
Kepler-748b		0.225	7.40742793			transit	4150	1.07	5934	
Kepler-749b		0.277	17.31716585			transit	2460	0.79	5009	
Kepler-750b		0.274	9.42887179			transit	3850	1.15	6160	
Kepler-750c		0.145	4.08899022			transit	3850	1.15	6160	
Kepler-751b		0.219	17.44490636			transit	2440	0.87	5387	
Kepler-752b		0.251	18.82747265			transit	3510	0.87	5373	
Kepler-753b		0.17	5.74772501			transit	910	0.68	4346	
Kepler-754b		0.179	14.5596237			transit	3890	1.06	5935	
Kepler-755b		0.157	1.26909037			transit	1200	0.82	5043	
Kepler-755c		0.112	2.85313364			transit	1200	0.82	5043	
Kepler-756b		0.1	1.22486632			transit	2780	0.82	5282	
Kepler-757b		0.121	1.02267882			transit	3310	1.08	6014	
Kepler-758b		0.221	12.1097104			transit	4410	1.16	6228	
Kepler-758c		0.151	4.75793986			transit	4410	1.16	6228	
Kepler-758d		0.189	20.4966197			transit	4410	1.16	6228	
Kepler-758e		0.136	8.1934719			transit	4410	1.16	6228	
Kepler-759b		0.203	41.805985			transit	2910	1.04	5860	
Kepler-760b		0.273	8.70419416			transit	2550	0.89	5322	
Kepler-760c		0.132	2.46697439			transit	2550	0.89	5322	
Kepler-761b		0.181	10.12804789			transit	2830	0.95	5706	
Kepler-762b		1.131	3.7705521			transit	4780	1.06	5944	
Kepler-763b		0.109	1.19655156			transit	2940	0.84	5166	
Kepler-764b		0.146	7.33683936			transit	3300	0.92	5557	
Kepler-765b		0.217	27.6655226			transit	3300	1.05	5901	
Kepler-766b		0.302	6.10027804			transit	5260	1.1	5992	
Kepler-767b		0.592	161.5280101			transit	3860	0.96	5694	
Kepler-768b		0.16	11.3910025			transit	2590	0.82	5108	
Kepler-769b		0.261	7.42608998			transit	4440	1.19	6186	
Kepler-769c		0.16	15.9870174			transit	4440	1.19	6186	
Kepler-770b		0.205	18.92540274			transit	2480	0.94	5598	
Kepler-770c		0.107	1.47532231			transit	2480	0.94	5598	
Kepler-770d		0.125	4.15244722			transit	2480	0.94	5598	
Kepler-771b		0.162	8.73485836			transit	3300	1.03	5906	
Kepler-772b		0.162	12.99207337			transit	2250	0.98	5714	
Kepler-773b		0.128	3.74910006			transit	1720	1.04	5850	
Kepler-774b		0.283	11.0895723			transit	3900	1.57	6403	
Kepler-775b		0.106	0.97486893			transit	1300	0.92	5468	
Kepler-776b		0.114	4.89718784			transit	2370	0.83	5071	
Kepler-777b		0.131	5.72812599			transit	1250	0.58	4043	
Kepler-778b		0.15	3.75574426			transit	2930	0.81	5102	
Kepler-779b		0.082	7.09714223			transit	730	0.46	3804	
Kepler-780b		0.079	0.67737516			transit	1700	1.01	5769	
Kepler-781b		0.258	13.2140732			transit	3380	0.81	5162	
Kepler-782b		0.286	158.6853308			transit	1340	0.98	5867	
Kepler-783b		0.07	4.29264638			transit	1770	0.93	5521	
Kepler-784b		0.141	31.5922646			transit	1970	1	5674	
Kepler-785b		1.162	1.97376093			transit	2170	0.77	4739	
Kepler-786b		0.217	53.5293487			transit	1670	0.81	4838	
Kepler-787b		0.114	0.9283105			transit	1530	0.65	4248	
Kepler-788b		0.227	8.39846269			transit	5380	1.16	6159	
Kepler-789b		0.189	8.63847725			transit	2980	1.01	5870	
Kepler-790b		0.194	13.73469807			transit	2370	0.84	5208	
Kepler-791b		0.272	14.5539759			transit	4720	1.3	6383	
Kepler-792b		0.175	11.30119217			transit	3930	1.09	5971	
Kepler-793b		0.122	4.24153639			transit	2590	0.98	5745	
Kepler-794b		0.188	11.13125132			transit	2490	1.19	5839	
Kepler-795b		0.15	29.6193421			transit	1490	0.94	5631	
Kepler-796b		0.116	6.40087618			transit	1230	0.93	5475	
Kepler-797b		0.194	27.07237711			transit	2450	0.96	5680	
Kepler-798b		0.213	13.71933369			transit	3540	1.19	6224	
Kepler-799b		0.614	133.4605235			transit	3360	0.95	5681	
Kepler-800b		0.254	14.13176026			transit	3420	0.85	5315	
Kepler-801b		0.178	11.41928253			transit	1370	0.67	4435	
Kepler-802b		0.316	40.0587473			transit	2700	0.93	5507	
Kepler-803b		0.338	50.28638192			transit	2010	1.05	5919	
Kepler-804b		0.173	14.37457351			transit	2110	1.01	5817	
Kepler-804c		0.102	9.65185017			transit	2110	1.01	5817	
Kepler-805b		0.258	30.8638931			transit	2140	1.19	6112	
Kepler-806b		0.102	8.09219642			transit	850	0.99	5770	
Kepler-808b		0.13	0.63133235			transit	1050	0.76	4653	
Kepler-809b		0.269	55.63934			transit	3040	0.99	5734	
Kepler-810b		0.172	4.59725385			transit	5070	1.03	5803	
Kepler-811b		0.241	23.58447697			transit	2760	1.01	5747	
Kepler-812b		0.317	10.11716531			transit	4830	1.45	6761	
Kepler-813b		0.191	19.12947337			transit	2700	0.95	5743	
Kepler-814b		0.189	6.1469851			transit	4330	1.15	6162	
Kepler-815b		0.367	8.57503552			transit	3910	1.25	5028	
Kepler-816b		0.914	10.50682565			transit	3450	0.9	5286	
Kepler-817b		0.806	3.99010623			transit	4570	1.03	5861	
Kepler-818b		0.456	10.03538581			transit	3150	0.94	5638	
Kepler-819b		0.246	33.1995648			transit	2350	0.86	5279	
Kepler-820b		0.543	127.8338098			transit	3230	1.23	6260	
Kepler-821b		0.117	1.92279873			transit	2020	0.84	5191	
Kepler-822b		0.158	3.22296927			transit	3120	1.06	5928	
Kepler-823b		0.14	4.16809082			transit	2920	0.98	5643	
Kepler-824b		0.167	4.51436633			transit	4410	1.15	6035	
Kepler-825b		0.136	3.77360059			transit	2700	1.03	5976	
Kepler-825c		0.164	8.1818246			transit	2700	1.03	5976	
Kepler-826b		0.112	4.48758907			transit	2120	1.05	6079	
Kepler-827b		0.502	51.92927591			transit	4410	0.93	5602	
Kepler-828b		0.135	0.56785714			transit	2040	0.81	5039	
Kepler-829b		0.188	6.88337562			transit	3110	0.98	5698	
Kepler-830b		0.152	11.29695137			transit	3660	1.07	6037	
Kepler-831b		0.113	5.62153941			transit	1880	0.99	5732	
Kepler-832b		0.184	7.1396941			transit	4390	0.92	5596	
Kepler-833b		0.18	18.7546998			transit	1370	0.64	4339	
Kepler-834b		0.18	13.32388301			transit	2000	0.7	4554	
Kepler-835b		0.249	11.41909375			transit	6560	1.08	5954	
Kepler-836b		0.244	11.36112327			transit	3270	1.03	5895	
Kepler-837b		0.228	16.56059504			transit	2760	0.85	5403	
Kepler-838b		0.244	15.74957994			transit	3900	0.98	5770	
Kepler-839b		0.229	37.8144514			transit	2720	1.22	6058	
Kepler-841b		0.467	124.4198398			transit	3430	0.85	5324	
Kepler-842b		0.143	1.21956827			transit	1800	0.78	4848	
Kepler-843b		0.231	2.05387982			transit	4070	1.02	5830	
Kepler-844b		0.15	2.61302086			transit	1290	0.59	4128	
Kepler-845b		0.182	0.92785982			transit	1540	0.79	4913	
Kepler-846b		0.221	19.80792185			transit	4020	0.94	5579	
Kepler-847b		0.105	2.3432319			transit	1730	0.83	4940	
Kepler-848b		0.152	6.91134416			transit	2600	1.01	5695	
Kepler-849b		0.637	394.6244904			transit	2440	1.23	6059	
Kepler-850b		0.159	7.19303878			transit	5010	1.06	5932	
Kepler-851b		0.15	8.50699658			transit	2830	0.89	5455	
Kepler-852b		0.227	44.9309804			transit	2790	1.19	6100	
Kepler-853b		0.151	7.16892463			transit	2000	1.3	6350	
Kepler-855b		0.745	7.8866311			transit	3400	1.03	5835	
Kepler-856b		0.83	8.02768059			transit	3830	0.96	5535	
Kepler-857b		0.607	85.35129427			transit	3390	0.99	5773	
Kepler-858b		0.434	76.13602028			transit	970	0.96	5653	
Kepler-859b		0.276	20.38177573			transit	2980	0.81	5020	
Kepler-860b		0.289	5.10137945			transit	4220	1.04	5836	
Kepler-861b		0.203	3.94963138			transit	2630	0.82	5047	
Kepler-862b		0.197	3.14866453			transit	2630	0.88	5333	
Kepler-863b		0.259	15.59461874			transit	3730	0.96	5678	
Kepler-864b		0.214	5.83376092			transit	5130	1	5754	
Kepler-865b		0.222	14.16399294			transit	2170	0.93	5570	
Kepler-866b		0.145	2.61703254			transit	2300	0.75	4751	
Kepler-867b		0.414	150.242127			transit	2690	0.92	5541	
Kepler-868b		0.183	5.03251791			transit	4140	0.93	5614	
Kepler-869b		0.322	40.4287755			transit	3120	0.97	5664	
Kepler-870b		0.248	21.3587621			transit	4010	1.01	5857	
Kepler-871b		0.334	22.0459018			transit	5530	1.11	5993	
Kepler-872b		0.178	2.57885507			transit	3630	1.05	5902	
Kepler-873b		0.335	20.5533844			transit	4560	1.18	6163	
Kepler-874b		0.352	40.0686727			transit	3500	1.09	6020	
Kepler-875b		0.259	27.5073799			transit	4060	1.06	5958	
Kepler-876b		0.128	5.14438011			transit	2400	0.81	5060	
Kepler-877b		0.189	18.45847097			transit	1870	0.85	5261	
Kepler-878b		0.172	25.9422033			transit	1850	0.81	5044	
Kepler-879b		0.229	33.3855938			transit	2520	1.02	5792	
Kepler-880b		0.237	7.71468975			transit	2200	1.46	6761	
Kepler-881b		0.159	4.44448017			transit	4450	1.06	5961	
Kepler-882b		0.11	3.98953967			transit	1710	0.9	5476	
Kepler-883b		0.159	12.98495573			transit	1790	1.06	6116	
Kepler-884b		0.11	5.69919514			transit	1400	1	5715	
Kepler-885b		0.223	18.11472949			transit	2060	1.21	6187	
Kepler-886b		0.136	6.24146367			transit	2800	1.1	6098	
Kepler-887b		0.164	20.42228798			transit	2710	1.19	6194	
Kepler-887c		0.101	7.63846023			transit	2710	1.19	6194	
Kepler-888b		0.157	70.6979061			transit	1350	0.97	5875	
Kepler-889b		0.097	3.744439			transit	1670	1.14	5961	
Kepler-890b		0.793	52.75875577			transit	4520	1.09	5954	
Kepler-891b		0.572	53.44945593			transit	4470	1.06	5887	
Kepler-892b		0.251	13.7521072			transit	2100	0.75	4747	
Kepler-893b		0.27	6.33855761			transit	3970	1	5820	
Kepler-894b		0.248	9.803224			transit	3600	0.87	5603	
Kepler-895b		0.137	2.80624233			transit	1680	0.65	4315	
Kepler-896b		0.226	144.547396			transit	2920	0.84	5262	
Kepler-897b		0.213	8.0472642			transit	3740	1.03	5839	
Kepler-898b		0.133	5.8706191			transit	1560	0.65	4223	
Kepler-899b		0.239	19.17891293			transit	3390	0.93	5595	
Kepler-900b		0.186	6.9913086			transit	1650	0.78	4836	
Kepler-901b		0.122	3.51749439			transit	790	0.59	4184	
Kepler-902b		0.227	40.1099547			transit	2950	0.95	5647	
Kepler-903b		0.179	10.3507721			transit	2700	0.98	5682	
Kepler-903c		0.226	62.9228557			transit	2700	0.98	5682	
Kepler-904b		0.158	3.02166863			transit	3750	1.16	6160	
Kepler-905b		0.126	5.08274652			transit	1700	0.95	5461	
Kepler-906b		0.188	41.6979976			transit	2470	1.06	6035	
Kepler-907b		0.107	15.86621821			transit	1150	1.08	6106	
Kepler-908b		0.109	1.34059747			transit	820	1.11	5973	
Kepler-909b		0.131	13.93290318			transit	1040	1.17	6154	
Kepler-910b		0.073	2.36436901			transit	1310	1.26	6230	
Kepler-911b		0.232	20.310501			transit	1850	1.34	6112	
Kepler-912b		0.25	2.53475627			transit	4130	1.07	5998	
Kepler-913b		0.184	10.29672521			transit	1950	0.63	4687	
Kepler-914b		0.123	4.40966548			transit	2210	1.1	5877	
Kepler-915b		0.134	4.59489604			transit	2630	1.21	6173	
Kepler-916b		0.157	32.2968798			transit	2510	0.85	5248	
Kepler-917b		0.17	2.97041437			transit	3350	0.8	5418	
Kepler-918b		0.155	4.85386933			transit	4060	1.11	6028	
Kepler-919b		0.201	11.04603384			transit	3980	1.15	6113	
Kepler-920b		0.216	6.53192704			transit	3020	0.89	5403	
Kepler-920c		0.339	100.8274113			transit	3020	0.89	5403	
Kepler-921b		0.256	51.300634			transit	2760	0.93	5663	
Kepler-922b		0.127	0.93846683			transit	1820	0.95	5671	
Kepler-923b		0.123	6.93366476			transit	3150	1.11	5988	
Kepler-924b		0.274	61.0370117			transit	3250	1.14	6167	
Kepler-925b		0.209	33.8678531			transit	2030	0.77	4673	
Kepler-926b		0.206	52.0688601			transit	2510	1.01	5806	
Kepler-927b		0.153	9.1149903			transit	2870	0.99	5743	
Kepler-928b		0.142	3.9324613			transit	1740	0.73	4700	
Kepler-929b		0.099	0.92103214			transit	2700	1.01	5869	
Kepler-930b		0.19	71.4517775			transit	2950	1.25	6335	
Kepler-931b		0.119	8.03755877			transit	1600	0.86	5241	
Kepler-932b		0.122	1.9214374			transit	1560	0.87	5331	
Kepler-933b		0.219	14.20443009			transit	3010	0.87	5346	
Kepler-934b		0.186	55.6738309			transit	1970	0.81	5001	
Kepler-935b		0.12	4.88083852			transit	1570	0.78	4830	
Kepler-936b		0.129	10.56134221			transit	2240	0.92	5482	
Kepler-937b		0.332	67.668827			transit	4830	1.15	6095	
Kepler-937c		0.238	153.343364			transit	4830	1.15	6095	
Kepler-938b		0.198	52.6298417			transit	2810	0.92	5533	
Kepler-939b		0.156	14.878296			transit	3360	0.88	5471	
Kepler-940b		0.298	59.6225257			transit	4300	0.97	5769	
Kepler-941b		0.275	17.42395198			transit	3600	0.89	5539	
Kepler-942b		0.19	44.96417488			transit	710	0.81	4861	
Kepler-943b		0.529	49.7701438			transit	4040	0.93	5612	
Kepler-944b		0.235	43.3167737			transit	3380	0.86	5409	
Kepler-945b		0.235	31.0033814			transit	5030	0.97	5718	
Kepler-946b		0.172	11.79162572			transit	2990	0.94	5665	
Kepler-947b		0.203	26.9644317			transit	3870	0.9	5508	
Kepler-948b		0.165	7.76846622			transit	2880	0.96	5679	
Kepler-949b		0.26	8.6893073			transit	1870	0.89	5403	
Kepler-950b		0.801	98.7180406			transit	4860	1.02	5857	
Kepler-951b		0.499	71.52530845			transit	1330	0.77	4834	
Kepler-952b		0.682	130.3546919			transit	3810	1	5730	
Kepler-953b		0.376	88.40655258			transit	780	0.95	5416	
Kepler-953c		0.106	9.10967112			transit	780	0.95	5416	
Kepler-954b		0.207	16.78176602			transit	730	0.82	4990	
Kepler-955b		0.279	14.53244172			transit	2080	0.89	5350	
Kepler-956b		0.268	5.24867263			transit	2060	1.1	6040	
Kepler-957b		0.491	5.90741354			transit	2440	0.81	4963	
Kepler-958b		0.184	9.7678805			transit	1520	0.91	5421	
Kepler-959b		0.391	14.80074836			transit	3270	1.6	7005	
Kepler-960b		0.204	3.12686223			transit	970	0.77	4755	
Kepler-961b		0.227	16.87727414			transit	1980	0.96	5582	
Kepler-962b		0.176	12.05707239			transit	1430	0.93	5478	
Kepler-963b		0.237	9.97683705			transit	2560	0.91	5461	
Kepler-964b		0.189	13.5225106			transit	1560	0.93	5427	
Kepler-965b		0.302	134.2527298			transit	2020	1.05	5886	
Kepler-966b		0.368	99.747622			transit	2520	1.02	5840	
Kepler-967b		0.21	13.22713379			transit	1630	0.84	5178	
Kepler-967c		0.326	198.7112502			transit	1630	0.84	5178	
Kepler-968b		0.178	3.69298373			transit	1020	0.76	4598	
Kepler-968c		0.151	5.70940492			transit	1020	0.76	4598	
Kepler-969b		0.185	34.1731714			transit	1340	0.92	5214	
Kepler-969c		0.088	1.6829346			transit	1340	0.92	5214	
Kepler-970b		0.247	16.73652231			transit	1100	0.7	4511	
Kepler-971b		0.19	9.59070716			transit	1130	0.88	5431	
Kepler-972b		0.415	7.03932553			transit	4250	1.15	6146	
Kepler-973b		0.175	49.6077331			transit	970	0.86	5213	
Kepler-974b		0.14	4.19449651			transit	390	0.52	3687	
Kepler-975b		0.132	1.97034246			transit	1320	0.8	4897	
Kepler-976b		0.353	105.9564148			transit	3300	0.87	5232	
Kepler-977b		0.234	26.85328322			transit	2170	0.87	5315	
Kepler-978b		0.267	49.6221509			transit	2040	1.07	6002	
Kepler-979b		0.243	8.0880135			transit	1980	0.87	5310	
Kepler-980b		0.238	11.55102504			transit	2620	1.05	5935	
Kepler-981b		0.206	4.46975774			transit	2980	0.98	5718	
Kepler-982b		0.201	15.7738221			transit	2290	1.16	6139	
Kepler-983b		0.211	60.0855082			transit	2140	1.13	6052	
Kepler-984b		0.189	43.0342272			transit	1500	0.96	5610	
Kepler-985b		0.266	116.331901			transit	2420	0.91	5434	
Kepler-986b		0.211	56.4349938			transit	1840	0.96	5642	
Kepler-987b		0.291	105.3033148			transit	3050	0.97	5637	
Kepler-988b		0.185	17.76080053			transit	810	0.55	4005	
Kepler-989b		0.197	7.96431535			transit	1580	0.82	5074	
Kepler-990b		0.232	9.91723428			transit	3040	1.05	5948	
Kepler-990c		0.136	0.53835431			transit	3040	1.05	5948	
Kepler-991b		0.227	82.5342519			transit	1200	0.64	4392	
Kepler-992b		0.145	20.16034462			transit	870	0.8	4944	
Kepler-993b		0.265	22.08557563			transit	970	0.57	3843	
Kepler-994b		0.143	1.15116651			transit	550	0.56	3934	
Kepler-995b		0.241	28.26731672			transit	2150	0.83	5206	
Kepler-996b		0.177	3.77059058			transit	3580	1.09	6014	
Kepler-997b		0.121	2.70730672			transit	1500	1.22	6150	
Kepler-998b		0.207	5.65377733			transit	3250	1.12	6058	
Kepler-999b		0.209	5.99185702			transit	1850	1.29	6237	
Kepler-1000b		0.425	120.0181272			transit	3020	1.4	6453	
Kepler-1001b		0.281	14.30511983			transit	3290	0.9	5491	
Kepler-1002b		0.153	4.33642933			transit	1390	1.22	6144	
Kepler-1003b		0.159	3.55485691			transit	2850	1.11	6109	
Kepler-1004b		0.56	5.28789787			transit	3500	1.11	4972	
Kepler-1005b		0.134	6.49801525			transit	1680	1	5782	
Kepler-1006b		0.137	19.76172042			transit	1620	0.78	5328	
Kepler-1007b		0.128	5.18500207			transit	1190	0.73	4587	
Kepler-1008b		0.114	12.43931193			transit	980	0.81	5066	
Kepler-1009b		0.194	11.35011917			transit	920	0.59	4027	
Kepler-1010b		0.207	34.2685705			transit	2000	0.86	5253	
Kepler-1011b		0.256	5.75322197			transit	2800	0.91	5416	
Kepler-1012b		0.115	5.50860439			transit	1400	0.95	5556	
Kepler-1013b		0.192	18.93054959			transit	1410	0.81	4954	
Kepler-1014b		0.213	16.57110363			transit	2190	0.88	5388	
Kepler-1015b		0.317	16.00494214			transit	3040	1.49	6769	
Kepler-1016b		0.194	1.95452434			transit	4040	0.99	5821	
Kepler-1016c		0.328	105.6551369			transit	4040	0.99	5821	
Kepler-1017b		0.178	7.23400469			transit	1810	0.93	5473	
Kepler-1018b		0.23	49.1013514			transit	2920	0.91	5518	
Kepler-1019b		0.13	1.41122985			transit	650	0.7	4433	
Kepler-1020b		0.203	96.9151496			transit	1450	0.87	5227	
Kepler-1021b		0.208	13.47469571			transit	2730	0.89	5431	
Kepler-1022b		0.211	10.99469878			transit	1480	0.71	4445	
Kepler-1023b		0.235	62.1387714			transit	2240	0.93	5494	
Kepler-1024b		0.349	66.4162133			transit	3320	0.81	5143	
Kepler-1025b		0.177	37.3229493			transit	2340	1.09	6089	
Kepler-1026b		0.197	36.5156053			transit	1270	0.79	4948	
Kepler-1027b		0.079	1.9078052			transit	950	0.91	5436	
Kepler-1028b		0.119	2.51462432			transit	2060	0.9	5522	
Kepler-1029b		0.112	4.41769648			transit	1380	0.82	5030	
Kepler-1030b		0.221	19.32952416			transit	2590	0.8	4983	
Kepler-1031b		0.078	1.22621732			transit	2420	1.09	6011	
Kepler-1032b		0.167	3.29011795			transit	1980	0.77	4647	
Kepler-1033b		0.224	7.56052806			transit	4650	0.94	5547	
Kepler-1034b		0.202	12.12400943			transit	2300	0.83	5198	
Kepler-1035b		0.104	2.71407755			transit	1330	0.98	5763	
Kepler-1036b		0.269	122.8808058			transit	1650	0.95	5533	
Kepler-1037b		0.114	1.06378867			transit	1470	0.82	5105	
Kepler-1038b		0.315	148.4603382			transit	2030	0.87	5335	
Kepler-1039b		0.13	0.93488424			transit	1060	0.79	4870	
Kepler-1040b		0.186	201.1214			transit	1540	0.98	5694	
Kepler-1041b		0.262	24.7576421			transit	3190	1.06	5957	
Kepler-1042b		0.195	10.13202575			transit	2150	0.75	4815	
Kepler-1043b		0.227	38.5053398			transit	2730	0.92	5629	
Kepler-1044b		0.238	6.77408868			transit	4920	1.08	5985	
Kepler-1045b		0.24	26.41045478			transit	3170	0.86	5301	
Kepler-1046b		0.153	14.37508035			transit	1690	1.04	5913	
Kepler-1047b		0.186	56.1886887			transit	1850	1.08	5754	
Kepler-1047c		0.088	3.18897601			transit	1850	1.08	5754	
Kepler-1048b		0.144	6.92101021			transit	1350	0.75	4651	
Kepler-1049b		0.085	3.27346074			transit	420	0.51	3864	
Kepler-1050b		0.143	15.3787546			transit	1810	1.09	6010	
Kepler-1050c		0.132	21.1284569			transit	1810	1.09	6010	
Kepler-1051b		0.303	25.96200249			transit	3330	1.43	6675	
Kepler-1052b		0.261	34.8538276			transit	3430	1.03	5888	
Kepler-1053b		0.087	2.41435165			transit	560	0.74	4529	
Kepler-1054b		0.235	4.30655689			transit	3400	1.22	6209	
Kepler-1055b		0.11	2.29503623			transit	1380	0.98	5723	
Kepler-1056b		0.269	27.495606			transit	3170	1.12	6127	
Kepler-1057b		0.3	14.08827448			transit	4770	1.07	5987	
Kepler-1058b		0.243	110.96546			transit	1710	0.73	4644	
Kepler-1059b		0.154	3.76419105			transit	2200	0.75	4906	
Kepler-1060b		0.212	46.8779367			transit	2810	0.99	5797	
Kepler-1061b		0.177	2.75798267			transit	1910	1.09	6067	
Kepler-1062b		0.157	9.30412078			transit	1270	0.75	4597	
Kepler-1063b		0.133	14.07971466			transit	1190	1.09	5945	
Kepler-1064b		0.138	16.54080322			transit	1220	0.85	5153	
Kepler-1065b		0.333	3.60930891			transit	3520	0.94	5635	
Kepler-1065c		0.143	2.37030743			transit	3520	0.94	5635	
Kepler-1066b		0.211	1.93155984			transit	1300	0.98	5762	
Kepler-1067b		0.071	0.76212926			transit	2250	0.95	5592	
Kepler-1068b		0.324	16.92344113			transit	5000	1.01	5806	
Kepler-1069b		0.143	23.8990296			transit	1420	0.99	5722	
Kepler-1070b		0.154	6.2216147			transit	3400	1.21	6261	
Kepler-1071b		0.212	6.1799844			transit	3140	0.86	5215	
Kepler-1072b		0.141	1.5690665			transit	3180	1.2	6199	
Kepler-1073b		0.205	8.67888593			transit	2730	1	5792	
Kepler-1073c		0.146	4.02582254			transit	2730	1	5792	
Kepler-1074b		0.112	5.94566534			transit	800	0.6	4002	
Kepler-1075b		0.127	1.52372816			transit	860	0.56	3959	
Kepler-1076b		0.071	6.14727918			transit	650	0.79	4868	
Kepler-1077b		0.247	34.3511874			transit	3580	1.02	5816	
Kepler-1078b		0.17	3.00725242			transit	3960	0.94	5612	
Kepler-1079b		0.145	13.24503188			transit	1570	1.08	5758	
Kepler-1080b		0.293	77.2548396			transit	2240	1.1	5956	
Kepler-1081b		0.09	3.85691855			transit	1390	0.88	5345	
Kepler-1082b		0.1	1.5432066			transit	2050	1.03	5923	
Kepler-1083b		0.3	33.4177993			transit	2970	0.81	5049	
Kepler-1084b		0.099	2.05333679			transit	1390	1.12	6113	
Kepler-1085b		0.644	219.3217528			transit	4950	1.11	6000	
Kepler-1086b		0.218	18.78425728			transit	1510	0.7	4350	
Kepler-1086c		0.262	161.5163345			transit	1510	0.7	4350	
Kepler-1087b		0.054	0.69384285			transit	1150	0.96	5589	
Kepler-1088b		0.127	23.12748644			transit	980	1.08	5975	
Kepler-1089b		0.163	5.13248562			transit	740	0.52	3753	
Kepler-1090b		0.201	198.680179			transit	2290	0.86	5321	
Kepler-1091b		0.13	1.43474156			transit	2980	1.01	5851	
Kepler-1092b		0.185	58.6017925			transit	2980	0.99	5862	
Kepler-1093b		0.174	25.0824626			transit	2770	1.13	6166	
Kepler-1093c		0.175	89.722292			transit	2770	1.13	6166	
Kepler-1094b		0.284	78.1000231			transit	4470	1.14	6112	
Kepler-1095b		0.108	4.27103091			transit	2470	0.94	5658	
Kepler-1096b		0.111	2.89221751			transit	1120	0.66	4306	
Kepler-1097b		0.291	187.747029			transit	2410	0.82	5211	
Kepler-1098b		0.116	2.54307286			transit	2860	0.99	5794	
Kepler-1099b		0.252	2.16845259			transit	3940	1.01	5837	
Kepler-1100b		0.156	6.42200058			transit	3100	1.21	6247	
Kepler-1101b		0.22	81.3151059			transit	2930	0.94	5614	
Kepler-1102b		0.237	51.3285623			transit	3220	0.96	5724	
Kepler-1103b		0.203	19.79191978			transit	3000	1.11	6092	
Kepler-1104b		0.11	5.03728015			transit	1680	1.3	6417	
Kepler-1105b		0.179	4.42157218			transit	1200	0.71	4299	
Kepler-1106b		0.147	1.25275217			transit	3810	1.11	6104	
Kepler-1107b		0.12	0.57103852			transit	1490	0.86	5268	
Kepler-1108b		0.13	4.51005748			transit	2490	0.88	5406	
Kepler-1109b		0.195	37.6467384			transit	2600	1.05	5893	
Kepler-1110b		0.237	9.69312032			transit	2370	0.73	4781	
Kepler-1111b		0.178	8.79617863			transit	3720	1.1	6077	
Kepler-1112b		0.269	14.36267939			transit	5660	1.34	6496	
Kepler-1113b		0.251	42.3004954			transit	3680	1.12	5931	
Kepler-1114b		0.12	14.97435694			transit	1390	0.87	5374	
Kepler-1115b		0.152	23.5540725			transit	3050	1.6	8480	
Kepler-1116b		0.227	41.6977827			transit	3320	0.95	5641	
Kepler-1117b		0.099	4.79028459			transit	2020	0.95	5612	
Kepler-1118b		0.244	38.6715075			transit	2670	0.96	5688	
Kepler-1119b		0.171	8.3265153			transit	4200	1.11	6083	
Kepler-1120b		0.123	2.94902905			transit	2070	0.78	4904	
Kepler-1121b		0.17	13.15141081			transit	1730	1.29	6231	
Kepler-1122b		0.182	42.1917357			transit	3010	0.92	5544	
Kepler-1123b		0.149	4.33946454			transit	2600	0.93	5500	
Kepler-1124b		0.114	2.85234897			transit	580	0.35	3658	
Kepler-1125b		0.164	17.6700642			transit	3000	0.95	5683	
Kepler-1126b		0.154	108.593329			transit	2180	0.92	5798	
Kepler-1127b		0.175	5.12330347			transit	3250	0.97	5664	
Kepler-1128b		0.326	61.6178167			transit	3790	0.94	5543	
Kepler-1129b		0.264	24.3397804			transit	4100	1	5831	
Kepler-1129c		0.244	76.5369586			transit	4100	1	5831	
Kepler-1130b		0.071	5.45298175			transit	760	0.9	5403	
Kepler-1131b		0.142	3.53232449			transit	3620	1.03	5851	
Kepler-1132b		0.21	62.8916228			transit	3100	0.87	5298	
Kepler-1133b		0.176	11.55562343			transit	2680	0.93	5569	
Kepler-1134b		0.236	17.13263989			transit	3250	0.84	5281	
Kepler-1135b		0.165	76.957857			transit	2370	0.96	5656	
Kepler-1136b		0.146	2.36172433			transit	1780	0.72	4512	
Kepler-1137b		0.196	23.9210791			transit	3170	1.5	6807	
Kepler-1138b		0.152	3.17060005			transit	3590	0.95	5582	
Kepler-1139b		0.106	0.81316672			transit	1810	0.94	5550	
Kepler-1140b		0.247	24.0862707			transit	2140	0.76	4850	
Kepler-1141b		0.073	2.34451194			transit	1190	1.01	5791	
Kepler-1142b		0.131	18.3027248			transit	2270	0.97	5685	
Kepler-1143b		0.149	2.88890485			transit	2060	0.81	5053	
Kepler-1143c		0.321	210.630591			transit	2060	0.81	5053	
Kepler-1144b		0.178	17.14647302			transit	3300	0.98	5753	
Kepler-1145b		0.125	3.97076766			transit	2330	0.79	5064	
Kepler-1146b		0.11	2.3522658			transit	2260	0.74	4692	
Kepler-1147b		0.233	10.62784997			transit	4810	1.09	5941	
Kepler-1148b		0.151	1.10446351			transit	2220	0.81	5054	
Kepler-1149b		0.128	3.73089898			transit	3340	1.02	5833	
Kepler-1150b		0.091	2.78786839			transit	1220	0.76	4754	
Kepler-1151b		0.198	65.6478424			transit	2490	0.88	5470	
Kepler-1152b		0.078	1.64680191			transit	600	0.55	3964	
Kepler-1153b		0.154	1.75583533			transit	3860	0.91	5470	
Kepler-1154b		0.209	5.1856142			transit	4990	1.26	6327	
Kepler-1154c		0.211	8.45808312			transit	4990	1.26	6327	
Kepler-1155b		0.181	33.469743			transit	3220	1.03	5842	
Kepler-1156b		0.118	11.89520511			transit	2480	1	5778	
Kepler-1157b		0.097	4.45743164			transit	1130	0.76	4679	
Kepler-1158b		0.209	13.5396293			transit	4100	1.41	6203	
Kepler-1159b		0.211	22.70816791			transit	4040	1.19	6217	
Kepler-1160b		0.191	7.97034958			transit	4220	0.92	5519	
Kepler-1161b		0.19	10.71252541			transit	1400	0.59	4253	
Kepler-1162b		0.197	32.5637069			transit	3230	0.89	5390	
Kepler-1163b		0.092	6.11786898			transit	1590	1.22	6302	
Kepler-1164b		0.1	3.97599768			transit	1460	0.85	5183	
Kepler-1165b		0.138	9.478522			transit	3530	1.13	6080	
Kepler-1166b		0.151	33.2406882			transit	2110	0.9	5446	
Kepler-1167b		0.153	1.00393374			transit	2650	0.79	4971	
Kepler-1168b		0.223	55.8226539			transit	2970	0.87	5157	
Kepler-1169b		0.084	6.11009134			transit	1750	1.24	6191	
Kepler-1170b		0.215	9.98969327			transit	2970	0.8	5069	
Kepler-1171b		0.228	1.44259224			transit	2010	1.58	7044	
Kepler-1172b		0.285	26.0204423			transit	4210	0.92	5558	
Kepler-1173b		0.079	0.7698536			transit	1310	0.86	5252	
Kepler-1174b		0.142	6.89225223			transit	2700	1.04	5936	
Kepler-1175b		0.267	37.94563			transit	4060	0.9	5453	
Kepler-1176b		0.219	24.1738579			transit	3340	1.01	5844	
Kepler-1177b		0.17	106.247547			transit	2700	0.98	5712	
Kepler-1178b		0.095	31.80634			transit	1100	0.8	4990	
Kepler-1179b		0.118	2.68505749			transit	1480	0.84	5212	
Kepler-1180b		0.178	16.8601286			transit	4190	1.09	6077	
Kepler-1181b		0.14	4.89337519			transit	2830	1.17	6176	
Kepler-1182b		0.215	11.17394617			transit	4100	1.04	5924	
Kepler-1183b		0.252	28.5057189			transit	4490	1	5765	
Kepler-1184b		0.239	53.5991044			transit	3890	1.05	5983	
Kepler-1185b		0.119	104.3518976			transit	970	0.96	5622	
Kepler-1186b		0.199	16.07677615			transit	3630	0.95	5635	
Kepler-1187b		0.233	18.87064068			transit	3360	1.06	5975	
Kepler-1188b		0.186	17.1369543			transit	3920	1.04	5913	
Kepler-1189b		0.158	3.78858982			transit	2880	1.11	6012	
Kepler-1190b		0.119	10.45843441			transit	1250	0.76	4730	
Kepler-1191b		0.135	5.60014851			transit	2860	0.85	5308	
Kepler-1192b		0.211	25.2034787			transit	3610	0.86	5438	
Kepler-1193b		0.118	2.83265213			transit	2270	1.08	5908	
Kepler-1194b		0.135	16.22371307			transit	2010	0.94	5590	
Kepler-1195b		0.186	8.49642241			transit	2650	0.74	4965	
Kepler-1196b		0.199	66.1849031			transit	3090	0.98	5756	
Kepler-1197b		0.112	2.03231845			transit	1650	0.78	4708	
Kepler-1198b		0.131	7.6847716			transit	2530	0.93	5517	
Kepler-1199b		0.103	15.0447198			transit	1800	0.94	5889	
Kepler-1200b		0.095	1.11854972			transit	1890	0.74	4612	
Kepler-1201b		0.204	15.18725932			transit	3920	1.15	6177	
Kepler-1202b		0.262	28.6851324			transit	4540	1.03	5834	
Kepler-1203b		0.095	0.58800076			transit	880	0.64	4105	
Kepler-1204b		0.272	85.7350285			transit	4180	1.03	5825	
Kepler-1205b		0.126	1.07839035			transit	2500	0.84	5226	
Kepler-1206b		0.146	1.21699766			transit	2630	0.8	4877	
Kepler-1207b		0.145	13.68237119			transit	3090	1.06	5909	
Kepler-1208b		0.207	11.08507637			transit	2860	0.8	5001	
Kepler-1209b		0.135	25.369116			transit	1820	1.23	6210	
Kepler-1210b		0.152	8.07124073			transit	3770	0.94	5568	
Kepler-1211b		0.227	11.01816836			transit	4850	0.96	5705	
Kepler-1212b		0.191	12.94130146			transit	4250	1.1	6051	
Kepler-1213b		0.106	5.34982412			transit	2230	1.14	6050	
Kepler-1214b		0.211	18.82634264			transit	2470	0.85	5130	
Kepler-1215b		0.109	4.76703963			transit	2290	0.95	5616	
Kepler-1216b		0.124	4.37034536			transit	3670	0.99	5743	
Kepler-1217b		0.178	2.03232507			transit	4450	1.06	5905	
Kepler-1218b		0.128	22.9221266			transit	2180	1.06	5986	
Kepler-1219b		0.189	16.10467749			transit	2030	1.25	5944	
Kepler-1220b		0.136	7.42693741			transit	3120	1	5842	
Kepler-1221b		0.168	12.00096042			transit	2960	0.87	5194	
Kepler-1222b		0.07	1.91694425			transit	1480	0.84	5239	
Kepler-1223b		0.109	16.301259			transit	1480	0.8	4870	
Kepler-1224b		0.119	13.32351601			transit	1890	1.18	6155	
Kepler-1225b		0.162	7.01075434			transit	4050	1.13	6140	
Kepler-1226b		0.129	17.2923453			transit	2540	1.02	5923	
Kepler-1227b		0.204	94.2887577			transit	2180	0.97	5747	
Kepler-1228b		0.137	0.57736958			transit	1780	0.78	5063	
Kepler-1229b		0.125	86.828989			transit	770	0.54	3784	Potentially habitable exoplanet
Kepler-1230b		0.242	9.95661537			transit	4670	1.06	5961	
Kepler-1231b		0.127	10.41725184			transit	3090	1.01	5778	
Kepler-1232b		0.172	26.7839183			transit	2400	0.92	5471	
Kepler-1233b		0.232	45.1263042			transit	4180	1.16	6198	
Kepler-1234b		0.251	11.94014029			transit	2820	0.8	4967	
Kepler-1235b		0.07	4.16055856			transit	1740	0.93	5541	
Kepler-1236b		0.191	31.0571618			transit	3520	0.86	5337	
Kepler-1237b		0.255	84.5733226			transit	3660	0.94	5472	
Kepler-1238b		0.172	4.14787559			transit	5000	1.3	6386	
Kepler-1239b		0.259	5.19104016			transit	8190	1.4	6564	
Kepler-1240b		0.103	4.8663815			transit	2000	0.98	5682	
Kepler-1241b		0.235	18.5525701			transit	3050	0.84	5261	
Kepler-1242b		0.202	13.62798432			transit	2220	0.77	4895	
Kepler-1243b		0.156	16.8320729			transit	2860	0.96	5667	
Kepler-1244b		0.12	3.70428172			transit	2490	1.46	6680	
Kepler-1245b		0.128	4.35409304			transit	2810	0.86	5306	
Kepler-1245c		0.128	2.93658468			transit	2810	0.86	5306	
Kepler-1246b		0.121	11.32271513			transit	1420	0.73	4611	
Kepler-1247b		0.208	13.71220213			transit	3570	0.86	5303	
Kepler-1248b		0.105	7.46725407			transit	1800	1.21	6149	
Kepler-1249b		0.212	24.3347127			transit	5460	1.19	6202	
Kepler-1250b		0.171	2.60754383			transit	4470	0.99	5717	
Kepler-1251b		0.164	45.0904643			transit	2810	0.92	5545	
Kepler-1252b		0.149	15.0540329			transit	2700	1.06	5949	
Kepler-1253b		0.119	68.8861915			transit	1300	0.97	5850	
Kepler-1254b		0.138	9.99113313			transit	2200	0.78	4985	
Kepler-1254c		0.116	3.60084276			transit	2200	0.78	4985	
Kepler-1254d		0.117	5.72717226			transit	2200	0.78	4985	
Kepler-1255b		0.207	36.2919336			transit	4380	1.08	6018	
Kepler-1256b		0.133	12.4127754			transit	2810	1.17	6129	
Kepler-1257b		0.136	2.66831376			transit	3530	0.9	5502	
Kepler-1258b		0.077	0.98494017			transit	2120	0.99	5839	
Kepler-1259b		0.128	0.66308526			transit	2300	0.8	5053	
Kepler-1260b		0.158	19.1187753			transit	3400	1.06	5961	
Kepler-1261b		0.202	48.4308991			transit	2590	0.82	5006	
Kepler-1262b		0.162	8.67900242			transit	3760	0.99	5771	
Kepler-1263b		0.102	4.55139967			transit	2270	0.84	5213	
Kepler-1264b		0.105	0.96852602			transit	2650	0.99	5791	
Kepler-1265b		0.12	6.49441289			transit	1890	0.71	4630	
Kepler-1266b		0.23	28.474748			transit	2940	0.8	5044	
Kepler-1267b		0.269	13.0313945			transit	5310	1.15	6096	
Kepler-1268b		0.181	40.9903986			transit	4590	1.06	5904	
Kepler-1269b		0.145	37.3331536			transit	2300	1.1	5998	
Kepler-1270b		0.296	6.03356196			transit	3930	1.28	5047	
Kepler-1271b		0.132	3.0255955			transit	2890	1.13	6143	
Kepler-1272b		0.211	51.1309704			transit	2920	1.06	5926	
Kepler-1273b		0.222	28.625653			transit	4420	0.94	5566	
Kepler-1274b		0.127	6.98152703			transit	1990	1.45	6179	
Kepler-1275b		0.132	3.65691115			transit	4200	1.23	6296	
Kepler-1276b		0.106	12.5720095			transit	1910	1.14	6188	
Kepler-1277b		0.143	40.8365012			transit	1980	0.94	5578	
Kepler-1278b		0.09	3.23941344			transit	2420	1.11	6074	
Kepler-1279b		0.156	23.4774101			transit	3320	1.21	6221	
Kepler-1280b		0.167	66.5579057			transit	3280	1.2	6227	
Kepler-1281b		0.146	3.11602791			transit	3600	0.87	5353	
Kepler-1282b		0.138	2.13194651			transit	3670	0.92	5504	
Kepler-1283b		0.17	12.9460978			transit	4740	1.16	6175	
Kepler-1284b		0.108	0.66407381			transit	2780	0.84	5123	
Kepler-1285b		0.087	14.7967458			transit	1190	1.2	6170	
Kepler-1286b		0.192	11.25402929			transit	3800	1	5753	
Kepler-1287b		0.137	11.47685909			transit	3350	0.96	5715	
Kepler-1288b		0.1	2.76122421			transit	2330	1.2	6132	
Kepler-1289b		0.136	7.99019627			transit	3450	1.1	6080	
Kepler-1290b		0.127	4.69500134			transit	4310	0.95	5660	
Kepler-1291b		0.148	8.63043276			transit	3200	0.84	5216	
Kepler-1292b		0.162	3.27646405			transit	4590	0.95	5556	
Kepler-1293b		0.087	5.57654784			transit	2500	1.18	6241	
Kepler-1294b		0.285	115.6862258			transit	3700	0.99	5776	
Kepler-1295b		0.138	3.81371974			transit	4100	0.92	5486	
Kepler-1296b		0.081	8.3839865			transit	2060	0.87	5359	
Kepler-1297b		0.087	1.68189002			transit	3250	0.99	5818	
Kepler-1298b		0.117	7.12811928			transit	1620	1.45	6339	
Kepler-1299b		0.266	19.9400874			transit	4410	0.94	5609	
Kepler-1300b		0.122	22.2419092			transit	2470	1.29	6130	
Kepler-1301b		0.125	9.08237046			transit	2660	0.85	5188	
Kepler-1302b		0.128	8.83922659			transit	2370	0.86	5236	
Kepler-1303b		0.127	7.56127224			transit	2950	1.01	5771	
Kepler-1304b		0.204	16.1288853			transit	2220	0.85	5259	
Kepler-1305b		0.168	13.5630972			transit	4380	0.97	5701	
Kepler-1306b		0.17	16.29595382			transit	3700	0.98	5727	
Kepler-1307b		0.22	18.01621096			transit	4550	1.06	5884	
Kepler-1308b		0.046	2.10433812			transit	240	0.35	3468	
Kepler-1309b		0.211	28.8432647			transit	2760	0.85	5235	
Kepler-1310b		0.128	0.67933627			transit	1900	0.91	5549	
Kepler-1311b		0.111	11.1726994			transit	2300	1.05	5748	
Kepler-1311c		0.109	2.53573424			transit	2300	1.05	5748	
Kepler-1312b		0.187	5.44832529			transit	990	0.99	5719	
Kepler-1313b		0.157	3.83309118			transit	610	0.92	5453	
Kepler-1314b		0.456	5.42474928			transit	1510	0.6	4188	
Kepler-1315b		0.123	0.84338011			transit	1650	0.8	4861	
Kepler-1316b		0.316	87.9732136			transit	2460	1.04	5884	
Kepler-1317b		0.139	0.56887443			transit	2390	0.83	5144	
Kepler-1318b		0.277	213.257663			transit	1550	0.73	4598	
Kepler-1319b		0.12	2.88676265			transit	370	0.56	3655	
Kepler-1320b		0.152	0.86838653			transit	2510	0.8	4817	
Kepler-1321b		0.439	11.12830484			transit	1780	0.54	4094	
Kepler-1321c		0.214	2.22649109			transit	1780	0.54	4094	
Kepler-1322b		0.144	0.96286738			transit	3970	0.9	5488	
Kepler-1323b		0.136	0.92990668			transit	1700	1.18	6169	
Kepler-1324b		0.135	4.11584468			transit	1700	0.78	4776	
Kepler-1325b		0.255	33.8786838			transit	3110	0.93	5550	
Kepler-1326b		0.373	42.3514267			transit	3000	1.45	6725	
Kepler-1327b		0.161	14.88801098			transit	2240	1.02	5885	
Kepler-1328b		0.087	4.52158888			transit	2100	1	5780	
Kepler-1329b		0.194	9.33646594			transit	2040	0.72	4500	
Kepler-1330b		0.147	10.10769068			transit	3060	0.97	5608	
Kepler-1331b		0.094	0.78916165			transit	1190	0.72	4508	
Kepler-1332b		0.122	11.87456832			transit	1680	0.95	5581	
Kepler-1333b		0.251	109.6471842			transit	3120	0.94	5628	
Kepler-1334b		0.204	15.64591713			transit	3410	0.94	5614	
Kepler-1335b		0.129	6.26406846			transit	2050	0.77	4903	
Kepler-1336b		0.177	23.198681			transit	2680	0.94	5512	
Kepler-1336c		0.153	5.77721211			transit	2680	0.94	5512	
Kepler-1337b		0.215	24.4002549			transit	1920	0.7	4523	
Kepler-1338b		0.082	0.93511806			transit	2020	1.04	5909	
Kepler-1339b		0.063	1.34155513			transit	870	0.94	5586	
Kepler-1340b		0.138	0.66502692			transit	4630	1.27	6331	
Kepler-1341b		0.267	132.9968322			transit	1520	0.79	4662	
Kepler-1342b		0.148	2.21571036			transit	3070	0.93	5527	
Kepler-1343b		0.172	3.35183158			transit	4260	0.95	5759	
Kepler-1344b		0.164	4.7683049			transit	2780	1.09	5981	
Kepler-1345b		0.211	44.6169557			transit	3800	1.32	6449	
Kepler-1346b		0.141	3.40165668			transit	3660	1.14	6133	
Kepler-1347b		0.092	14.00947528			transit	1050	0.82	5193	
Kepler-1348b		0.173	27.5722742			transit	3370	1.04	5911	
Kepler-1349b		0.062	2.12823928			transit	850	1.16	6086	
Kepler-1350b		0.225	4.4968604			transit	1100	0.55	3827	
Kepler-1350c		0.154	1.76678906			transit	1100	0.55	3827	
Kepler-1351b		0.058	0.91614077			transit	790	0.7	4439	
Kepler-1352b		0.079	1.87788275			transit	2080	1.11	6118	
Kepler-1353b		0.161	24.7543966			transit	1940	0.76	4776	
Kepler-1354b		0.265	76.613377			transit	3450	1.16	6168	
Kepler-1355b		0.13	1.28958811			transit	3140	0.88	5352	
Kepler-1356b		0.136	0.63400294			transit	2870	0.82	5106	
Kepler-1357b		0.114	3.0091324			transit	3350	0.93	5597	
Kepler-1358b		0.1	7.06317341			transit	1820	0.82	5181	
Kepler-1359b		0.252	59.4970952			transit	2180	0.78	4709	
Kepler-1360b		0.303	40.5286413			transit	4580	1.51	6778	
Kepler-1361b		0.077	3.57554956			transit	1320	0.83	5131	
Kepler-1362b		0.232	136.205626			transit	2500	0.8	4857	
Kepler-1363b		0.112	2.94194094			transit	1820	0.76	4839	
Kepler-1364b		0.192	13.32196237			transit	3750	1.49	6805	
Kepler-1365b		0.082	7.69993485			transit	1760	1	5770	
Kepler-1365c		0.071	4.77468005			transit	1760	1	5770	
Kepler-1366b		0.128	2.16457097			transit	1290	0.62	4070	
Kepler-1367b		0.082	1.57409027			transit	1160	0.62	4106	
Kepler-1368b		0.147	0.67564949			transit	5700	1.07	5906	
Kepler-1369b		0.24	25.873148			transit	4030	0.99	5761	
Kepler-1370b		0.164	20.2641684			transit	2860	1.19	6202	
Kepler-1370c		0.113	7.44142113			transit	2860	1.19	6202	
Kepler-1371b		0.065	3.4462039			transit	1500	0.87	5361	
Kepler-1371c		0.057	2.00541269			transit	1500	0.87	5361	
Kepler-1372b		0.113	1.31155557			transit	3790	0.98	5677	
Kepler-1373b		0.103	1.29123275			transit	3630	1.22	6299	
Kepler-1374b		0.204	10.65276707			transit	3700	0.85	5323	
Kepler-1375b		0.155	3.3004192			transit	4040	1.47	6704	
Kepler-1376b		0.094	5.30880656			transit	2820	0.98	5659	
Kepler-1377b		0.112	0.74092842			transit	3320	0.86	5218	
Kepler-1378b		0.196	11.95398936			transit	1830	0.7	4407	
Kepler-1379b		0.116	0.88184115			transit	3100	0.83	5188	
Kepler-1380b		0.128	10.3108245			transit	3940	0.96	5570	
Kepler-1381b		0.201	25.3842686			transit	4260	0.96	5747	
Kepler-1382b		0.168	16.3583055			transit	2400	1.36	6161	
Kepler-1383b		0.126	13.9093583			transit	3130	1.26	6370	
Kepler-1384b		0.173	15.36262753			transit	2020	0.78	4919	
Kepler-1385b		0.076	2.88879862			transit	1720	1.15	5732	
Kepler-1386b		0.111	6.73972381			transit	2730	1.02	5733	
Kepler-1387b		0.083	2.27952666			transit	1600	0.82	5046	
Kepler-1388b		0.231	12.2854603			transit	1600	0.63	4098	
Kepler-1388c		0.202	5.53608151			transit	1600	0.63	4098	
Kepler-1388d		0.255	20.9568158			transit	1600	0.63	4098	
Kepler-1388e		0.219	37.6327084			transit	1600	0.63	4098	
Kepler-1389b		0.158	99.2530951			transit	1700	0.81	5078	
Kepler-1390b		0.105	6.48021673			transit	2500	0.98	5753	
Kepler-1391b		0.15	54.4092333			transit	2350	1.03	5840	
Kepler-1392b		0.175	15.1410397			transit	3640	0.88	5479	
Kepler-1393b		0.071	2.44357812			transit	1510	0.95	5697	
Kepler-1394b		0.124	3.93766373			transit	2700	1.64	6481	
Kepler-1395b		0.071	3.78470649			transit	1650	1.17	6138	
Kepler-1396b		0.185	18.2206421			transit	4030	1.18	6195	
Kepler-1397b		0.153	47.449955			transit	2500	1.09	6026	
Kepler-1398b		0.08	2.78815679			transit	2590	1.13	6126	
Kepler-1398c		0.092	4.13827595			transit	2590	1.13	6126	
Kepler-1399b		0.112	1.63865306			transit	4100	0.97	5735	
Kepler-1400b		0.145	9.06689421			transit	2870	0.83	5044	
Kepler-1401b		0.15	11.20066445			transit	4050	1.07	5964	
Kepler-1402b		0.068	2.03387914			transit	2220	0.9	5416	
Kepler-1403b		0.191	5.19492202			transit	5870	1.11	6060	
Kepler-1404b		0.179	15.9314739			transit	3090	0.84	5261	
Kepler-1405b		0.353	28.2274184			transit	5230	1.05	5925	
Kepler-1406b		0.098	11.62905828			transit	1910	1.05	5892	
Kepler-1407b		0.201	20.0711504			transit	4160	1.1	6010	
Kepler-1408b		0.079	2.99793191			transit	1390	1.21	6170	
Kepler-1409b		0.093	0.76486493			transit	2350	0.83	5160	
Kepler-1410b		0.159	60.866168			transit	1200	0.63	4092	Potentially habitable exoplanet
Kepler-1411b		0.252	86.1150888			transit	4670	0.95	5664	
Kepler-1412b		0.074	3.6146051			transit	2080	1.06	5880	
Kepler-1413b		0.162	13.1829642			transit	3790	0.84	5196	
Kepler-1414b		0.11	3.51576315			transit	1740	0.8	4951	
Kepler-1415b		0.115	0.63642408			transit	3480	0.89	5267	
Kepler-1416b		0.079	1.49514952			transit	2630	1.09	6019	
Kepler-1417b		0.089	20.3505213			transit	2140	1.02	5839	
Kepler-1418b		0.148	22.4764425			transit	1630	0.77	4770	
Kepler-1419b		0.255	42.5215895			transit	4710	1.01	5796	
Kepler-1420b		0.114	6.69960006			transit	3010	0.82	5187	
Kepler-1421b		0.083	6.9131112			transit	2200	1.25	6335	
Kepler-1422b		0.18	18.6051942			transit	6790	1.15	6194	
Kepler-1423b		0.095	23.955378			transit	1460	0.79	4939	
Kepler-1424b		0.103	29.6091744			transit	2000	1.02	5838	
Kepler-1425b		0.084	14.4541302			transit	1630	0.97	5718	
Kepler-1426b		0.139	14.2563227			transit	3950	1.02	5831	
Kepler-1427b		0.098	0.96897238			transit	4000	1.01	5793	
Kepler-1428b		0.146	10.67607169			transit	2620	1.28	6184	
Kepler-1429b		0.115	4.48487493			transit	3770	1.05	5902	
Kepler-1430b		0.105	2.46050993			transit	1760	0.77	4796	
Kepler-1431b		0.131	5.86601526			transit	4100	1.03	5806	
Kepler-1432b		0.198	23.9109011			transit	5060	1.09	6031	
Kepler-1433b		0.139	4.13592271			transit	4330	1.14	6097	
Kepler-1434b		0.099	8.05333618			transit	2200	1.47	6291	
Kepler-1435b		0.077	4.45343281			transit	2220	1.21	6356	
Kepler-1436b		0.117	9.705716			transit	3720	1.06	5972	
Kepler-1437b		0.122	10.9295461			transit	3860	0.93	5557	
Kepler-1438b		0.084	2.31942009			transit	2820	0.97	5530	
Kepler-1439b		0.13	8.07392849			transit	700	0.46	3578	
Kepler-1440b		0.112	39.859484			transit	2230	0.98	5698	
Kepler-1441b		0.117	39.4419839			transit	2450	1	5802	
Kepler-1442b		0.351	81.4162941			transit	1710	1.34	6394	
Kepler-1443b		0.087	2.41811321			transit	1550	1.19	6289	
Kepler-1444b		0.194	33.42035034			transit	1100	1.03	5810	
Kepler-1445b		0.086	10.60052251			transit	1570	1.13	6150	
Kepler-1446b		0.073	0.68996783			transit	530	0.81	4865	
Kepler-1447b		0.259	56.6747285			transit	2840	0.97	5722	
Kepler-1448b		0.144	12.27065865			transit	2560	0.95	5774	
Kepler-1449b		0.15	13.2274528			transit	4310	1.08	5979	
Kepler-1450b		0.153	54.5094166			transit	1600	0.71	4524	
Kepler-1451b		0.299	35.622233			transit	3780	1	5782	
Kepler-1452b		0.241	42.913751			transit	3180	1.41	6101	
Kepler-1453b		0.238	47.1611696			transit	4190	0.97	5665	
Kepler-1454b		0.168	47.0319479			transit	2590	0.9	5448	
Kepler-1455b		0.193	49.276764			transit	1280	0.62	4075	Potentially habitable exoplanet
Kepler-1456b		0.102	18.1373829			transit	1240	0.64	4231	
Kepler-1457b		0.178	51.1110243			transit	2370	1.01	5866	
Kepler-1458b		0.246	47.9872764			transit	2090	0.96	5653	
Kepler-1459b		0.121	62.8691611			transit	1420	0.78	4828	
Kepler-1460b		0.175	29.9633247			transit	1870	0.7	4422	
Kepler-1461b		0.181	29.3494775			transit	2450	0.79	4919	
Kepler-1462b		0.341	65.6488341			transit	4460	1	5756	
Kepler-1463b		0.166	25.15864			transit	4370	0.96	5679	
Kepler-1464b		0.148	31.7785901			transit	2260	1.02	5828	
Kepler-1464c		0.089	5.32786292			transit	2260	1.02	5828	
Kepler-1465b		0.158	31.8277111			transit	1100	0.75	4726	
Kepler-1466b		0.138	31.1750448			transit	2240	1.01	5884	
Kepler-1467b		0.294	47.0569043			transit	2900	0.86	5332	
Kepler-1468b		0.154	8.23984869			transit	3700	1.04	5893	
Kepler-1468c		0.103	3.54553021			transit	3700	1.04	5893	
Kepler-1469b		0.25	21.8635301			transit	4090	0.92	5507	
Kepler-1470b		0.095	16.2950903			transit	1860	0.8	4961	
Kepler-1471b		0.126	3.63899398			transit	3450	0.95	5660	
Kepler-1472b		0.17	38.1312831			transit	4140	1.16	6159	
Kepler-1473b		0.106	14.4273551			transit	2040	1.09	6046	
Kepler-1474b		0.193	36.4333452			transit	3960	1.04	5870	
Kepler-1475b		0.261	82.177374			transit	5590	1.18	6214	
Kepler-1476b		0.149	10.35863224			transit	3970	0.98	5663	
Kepler-1477b		0.105	11.55530021			transit	1710	0.81	5100	
Kepler-1478b		0.154	26.0840594			transit	4580	1.04	5904	
Kepler-1479b		0.163	14.53261362			transit	2020	0.99	5796	
Kepler-1480b		0.149	22.12679948			transit	1800	0.85	5156	
Kepler-1481b		0.11	5.94220998			transit	1610	0.8	4908	
Kepler-1482b		0.09	12.25383217			transit	1440	0.88	5381	
Kepler-1483b		0.136	9.5085156			transit	4330	1.25	6337	
Kepler-1484b		0.188	30.4549136			transit	3570	0.94	5730	
Kepler-1485b		0.131	19.9157725			transit	1800	1.11	6087	
Kepler-1486b		0.207	54.6495759			transit	4780	1.08	5965	
Kepler-1487b		0.19	7.31946363			transit	3570	1.38	6541	
Kepler-1488b		0.166	39.8189932			transit	2020	1.05	5820	
Kepler-1489b		0.158	82.294751			transit	2800	0.93	5655	
Kepler-1490b		0.271	92.4362973			transit	3160	0.9	5515	
Kepler-1491b		0.135	16.5861762			transit	4280	1	5728	
Kepler-1492b		0.133	16.75255007			transit	1210	0.77	4712	
Kepler-1493b		0.126	15.0217983			transit	1870	1.06	5863	
Kepler-1494b		0.274	91.080482			transit	3450	0.96	5659	
Kepler-1495b		0.262	85.273256			transit	4260	1.03	5831	
Kepler-1496b		0.198	64.6588017			transit	4220	1.18	6182	
Kepler-1497b		0.148	8.74199772			transit	3660	0.96	5675	
Kepler-1498b		0.119	48.051405			transit	2400	0.86	5256	
Kepler-1499b		0.106	44.2008			transit	1000	0.82	5097	
Kepler-1500b		0.107	15.0330105			transit	2950	1	5845	
Kepler-1501b		0.139	14.5564533			transit	2900	1.2	6229	
Kepler-1502b		0.284	41.7083629			transit	5000	1.44	6666	
Kepler-1503b		0.203	96.16987			transit	2800	0.77	5069	
Kepler-1504b		0.19	82.304003			transit	3360	0.85	5393	
Kepler-1505b		0.083	30.8609366			transit	1170	0.93	5686	
Kepler-1506b		0.118	14.0329154			transit	4300	0.95	5676	
Kepler-1507b		0.075	16.0506213			transit	1120	0.89	5410	
Kepler-1508b		0.119	20.7056504			transit	2910	1.14	6158	
Kepler-1509b		0.165	25.4338197			transit	4170	1	5780	
Kepler-1510b		0.3	84.703921			transit	5270	1.19	6200	
Kepler-1511b		0.15	23.2382792			transit	2930	1.17	6064	
Kepler-1512b		0.105	20.35972599			transit	530	0.73	4372	
Kepler-1513b		0.755	160.88465087			transit	1250	0.99	5617	
Kepler-1514b		1.055	217.8317626			transit	1240	1.21	6251	
Kepler-1515b		0.852	214.3114164			transit	1640	1.3	6511	
Kepler-1516b		0.156	7.25931979			transit	2840	1.04	5904	
Kepler-1517b		0.871	5.54608367			transit	2830	1.58	7010	
Kepler-1518b		0.272	5.11177904			transit	3700	1.54	6846	
Kepler-1519b		0.63	240.7989397			transit	2800	0.94	5644	
Kepler-1520b		0.515	0.65355357			transit	2070	0.76	4677	
Kepler-1521b		0.223	47.14840805			transit	740	0.81	5042	
Kepler-1522b		0.154	1.84788917			transit	2300	0.96	5706	
Kepler-1523b		0.141	0.93875077			transit	2990	0.97	5708	
Kepler-1524b		0.316	70.9674603			transit	1650	1.17	6179	
Kepler-1525b		0.081	2.41660118			transit	1290	1.07	5748	
Kepler-1526b		0.217	3.908632			transit	1880	0.73	4601	
Kepler-1527b		0.426	160.129918			transit	5100	1.21	6224	
Kepler-1528b		0.13	1.79111021			transit	2990	1.03	5857	
Kepler-1529b		0.187	5.33905686			transit	2230	0.81	5048	
Kepler-1530b		0.146	2.5904434			transit	1800	0.92	5477	
Kepler-1530c		0.147	5.3227406			transit	1800	0.92	5477	
Kepler-1531b		0.099	1.13854338			transit	2200	1.16	6260	
Kepler-1532b		0.12	1.09366356			transit	2690	0.91	5559	
Kepler-1533b		0.309	308.5471			transit	2780	1.31	6431	
Kepler-1534b		0.169	5.71668872			transit	3610	0.9	5442	
Kepler-1535b		0.227	138.9442			transit	2870	1.08	6021	
Kepler-1536b		0.28	364.758031			transit	1310	0.71	4434	
Kepler-1537b		0.105	1.4444538			transit	1640	0.81	5079	
Kepler-1538b		0.252	175.138819			transit	4210	1.03	5837	
Kepler-1539b		0.241	133.3036741			transit	2570	0.84	5176	
Kepler-1540b		0.222	125.4131177			transit	850	0.74	4540	Potentially habitable exoplanet
Kepler-1541b		0.103	8.40691199			transit	1350	0.86	5282	
Kepler-1542b		0.068	3.95116882			transit	1100	0.94	5564	
Kepler-1542c		0.058	2.89223021			transit	1100	0.94	5564	
Kepler-1542d		0.078	5.99273738			transit	1100	0.94	5564	
Kepler-1542e		0.068	5.10115756			transit	1100	0.94	5564	
Kepler-1543b		0.242	6.96710269			transit	3630	1.39	6561	
Kepler-1544b		0.159	168.811174			transit	1140	0.81	4886	Potentially habitable exoplanet
Kepler-1545b		0.241	163.692349			transit	2240	0.84	5201	
Kepler-1546b		0.279	19.5974971			transit	3240	0.95	5623	
Kepler-1547b		0.08	0.69297968			transit	2170	1.12	6078	
Kepler-1548b		0.236	124.828679			transit	3800	0.99	5706	
Kepler-1549b		0.229	214.886545			transit	2580	0.88	5324	
Kepler-1550b		0.269	225.582809			transit	3920	1.07	5991	
Kepler-1551b		0.237	24.4973698			transit	5100	1.14	6136	
Kepler-1552b		0.22	184.771853			transit	2020	0.85	5202	
Kepler-1553b		0.103	4.24261881			transit	2350	0.85	5288	
Kepler-1554b		0.259	198.088774			transit	3200	0.84	5297	
Kepler-1555b		0.144	8.10501635			transit	4510	1.04	5866	
Kepler-1556b		0.175	8.82713457			transit	3500	0.97	5608	
Kepler-1557b		0.136	3.74032496			transit	5000	1.11	6099	
Kepler-1558b		0.061	3.50470358			transit	1120	0.83	5101	
Kepler-1559b		0.064	0.97191543			transit	1900	0.86	5316	
Kepler-1560b		0.079	3.03195744			transit	1730	1.02	5815	
Kepler-1561b		0.097	1.00520701			transit	3240	1.07	5957	
Kepler-1562b		0.317	64.2737752			transit	4290	1.02	5760	
Kepler-1563b		0.067	3.43276598			transit	1780	1	5765	
Kepler-1564b		0.131	18.0540381			transit	2840	0.93	5528	
Kepler-1565b		0.106	1.53818844			transit	2140	0.76	4940	
Kepler-1566b		0.07	0.53991524			transit	1670	0.84	5254	
Kepler-1567b		0.244	153.979578			transit	4000	0.95	5655	
Kepler-1568b		0.116	20.925392			transit	2880	1.09	5956	
Kepler-1569b		0.15	5.79180156			transit	3400	1.25	6319	
Kepler-1570b		0.095	26.548955			transit	1510	0.92	5550	
Kepler-1571b		0.136	3.38555488			transit	2620	1.23	6297	
Kepler-1572b		0.084	5.49548621			transit	2000	0.97	5618	
Kepler-1573b		0.107	2.6157554			transit	3800	1.01	5808	
Kepler-1574b		0.115	6.9424334			transit	4160	1.06	5892	
Kepler-1575b		0.117	2.55314213			transit	3800	0.95	5667	
Kepler-1576b		0.093	6.98471973			transit	1760	1.05	5876	
Kepler-1577b		0.101	6.30560247			transit	1770	0.78	4862	
Kepler-1578b		0.093	1.45088691			transit	3310	0.9	5545	
Kepler-1579b		0.075	0.84990789			transit	1520	0.75	4584	
Kepler-1580b		0.188	56.6449279			transit	2840	1.47	6228	
Kepler-1581b		0.071	6.28385491			transit	1440	1.12	6022	
Kepler-1582b		0.133	4.83817712			transit	370	0.28	3208	
Kepler-1583b		0.054	9.32807355			transit	1160	0.94	5645	
Kepler-1584b		0.144	13.3997099			transit	4320	1.1	6069	
Kepler-1585b		0.16	3.5827463			transit	4140	0.94	5538	
Kepler-1586b		0.136	15.6049212			transit	2820	1.45	6681	
Kepler-1587b		0.119	9.4060467			transit	2960	1.08	5933	
Kepler-1588b		0.068	7.84931739			transit	2150	0.96	5817	
Kepler-1589b		0.097	0.99166527			transit	4620	1.18	6166	
Kepler-1590b		0.102	7.61760804			transit	2900	1.11	6053	
Kepler-1591b		0.113	8.18504949			transit	3600	1.1	6082	
Kepler-1592b		0.137	3.05710069			transit	4400	1.18	6213	
Kepler-1593b		0.283	174.509835			transit	2460	0.81	4995	Potentially habitable exoplanet
Kepler-1594b		0.095	2.71603809			transit	3600	1.06	5946	
Kepler-1595b		0.11	4.56380468			transit	2740	0.84	5203	
Kepler-1596b		0.17	66.373379			transit	3800	0.95	5706	
Kepler-1597b		0.095	2.94654179			transit	4090	1.25	6377	
Kepler-1598b		0.085	4.34195123			transit	2390	1.07	5940	
Kepler-1599b		0.145	122.363553			transit	3270	0.99	5767	
Kepler-1600b		0.279	386.370548			transit	3240	0.86	5214	
Kepler-1601b		0.073	2.20921951			transit	2200	1.04	5869	
Kepler-1602b		0.12	11.17931605			transit	2660	1.22	6296	
Kepler-1603b		0.115	2.27163926			transit	5710	1.21	6241	
Kepler-1604b		0.126	0.68368426			transit	1830	0.81	4976	
Kepler-1605b		0.096	85.7565495			transit	730	0.86	5280	
Kepler-1606b		0.185	196.435224			transit	2900	0.9	5422	Potentially habitable exoplanet
Kepler-1607b		0.082	13.6473676			transit	2400	1.14	6116	
Kepler-1608b		0.154	16.4735686			transit	2710	0.75	4992	
Kepler-1609b		0.198	114.34219			transit	4840	1.18	6132	
Kepler-1610b		0.144	8.70181574			transit	3470	0.91	5383	
Kepler-1611b		0.072	5.1762429			transit	2240	0.94	5605	
Kepler-1612b		0.092	3.91795101			transit	2730	0.96	5643	
Kepler-1613b		0.186	1.5184299			transit	2790	1.08	6005	
Kepler-1614b		0.133	3.9466141			transit	3200	0.79	5121	
Kepler-1615b		0.184	47.3126192			transit	3100	1.04	5865	
Kepler-1616b		0.091	6.76284377			transit	2810	1.21	6266	
Kepler-1617b		0.107	27.4785572			transit	2650	1.15	6167	
Kepler-1618b		0.112	6.10826019			transit	4040	1.41	6620	
Kepler-1619b		0.068	23.6225913			transit	1700	1	5852	
Kepler-1620b		0.144	101.951829			transit	2520	1.15	6157	
Kepler-1621b		0.193	92.263714			transit	4770	1.15	6158	
Kepler-1622b		0.131	10.8118737			transit	3020	1.31	6436	
Kepler-1623b		0.117	4.36128348			transit	3220	1	5772	
Kepler-1624b		0.509	3.29030452			transit	650	0.5	3636	
Kepler-1625b		0.541	287.378949			transit	3960	0.96	5677	
Kepler-1626b		0.18	4.13962966			transit	5600	1.51	6826	
Kepler-1627b		0.329	7.20283653			transit	1010	0.87	5445	Young (38 million years) host star
Kepler-1628b		0.574	76.378033			transit	1150	0.55	3724	
Kepler-1629b		0.069	3.87595807			transit	1300	1.01	5776	
Kepler-1630b		0.195	509.997402			transit	910	0.66	4736	
Kepler-1631b		0.12	4.09513932			transit	3900	0.97	5679	
Kepler-1632b		0.22	448.303558			transit	1900	1.12	6137	
Kepler-1633b		0.141	186.404271			transit	2650	1.2	6256	
Kepler-1634b		0.285	374.876239			transit	2130	0.92	5474	
Kepler-1635b		0.325	469.63111			transit	3540	0.89	5347	
Kepler-1636b		0.288	425.47785			transit	5110	1.01	5797	
Kepler-1637b		0.079	6.10960324			transit	1650	1.02	5789	
Kepler-1638b		0.167	259.33683			transit	2870	0.97	5710	Potentially habitable exoplanet
Kepler-1639b		0.23	9.878482			transit	3810	1.12	6150	
Kepler-1640b		0.43	7.5844126			transit	4500	1.27	6324	
Kepler-1641b		0.277	19.672266			transit	3130	1.12	6152	
Kepler-1641c		0.263	32.657212			transit	3130	1.12	6152	
Kepler-1642b		0.285	12.2057513			transit	1460	0.88	5355	
Kepler-1642c		0.237	6.6513802			transit	1460	0.88	5355	
Kepler-1643b		0.205	5.34264507			transit	1350	0.92	5508	Young host star
Kepler-1644b		0.168	21.0907758			transit	1930	0.89	5499	
Kepler-1645b		0.159	16.1779561			transit	2750	1.02	5812	
Kepler-1646b		0.11	4.48558383			transit	260	0.24	3299	
Kepler-1647b	1.51968	1.059	1107.5923	2.7205		transit		1.22	6210	
OGLE-2007-BLG-349(AB)c	0.25171		2557	2.59		microlensing	9000	0.41		
OGLE-2012-BLG-0724Lb	0.47			1.6		microlensing	22000	0.29		
OGLE-2014-BLG-0676Lb	3.09			4.4		microlensing	7200	0.62		
OGLE-2015-BLG-0051Lb	0.72			0.73		microlensing	27000	0.1		
OGLE-2015-BLG-0954Lb	3.9			1.2		microlensing	2000	0.33		
OGLE-2012-BLG-0950Lb	0.11012			2.7		microlensing	9800	0.56		
OGLE-2014-BLG-1760Lb	0.56			1.75		microlensing	22400	0.51		
Pr0211 c	7.79		4850	5.5		radial vel.		0.94	5300	Host star belongs to Beehive Cluster
Proxima Centauri b	0.004		11.186	0.0485		radial vel.	4.2	0.12	3050	Nearest exoplanet to the Solar System, and is potentially habitable
Qatar-3b	4.31	1.096	2.5079204	0.03783	1681	transit		1.15	6007	
Qatar-4b	6.10	1.135	1.8053564	0.02803	1385	transit		0.90	5215	
Qatar-5b	4.32	1.107	2.8792319	0.04127	1415	transit		1.13	5747	
Rho Coronae Borealis c	0.07866		102.54	0.4123	448	radial vel.	56.2	0.89	5627	
TRAPPIST-1b	0.00267	0.097	1.51087081	0.01111	400	transit	39	0.08	2559	
TRAPPIST-1c	0.00434	0.094	2.4218233	0.01521	342	transit	39	0.08	2559	
TRAPPIST-1d	0.00129	0.069	4.04961	0.02144	288	transit	39	0.08	2559	Potentially habitable exoplanet
TYC 3667-1280-1 b	5.4		26.468	0.21	1350	radial vel.	1570	1.87	5130	Red giant star host
V830 Tauri b	0.7		4.927	0.057		radial vel.	490	1	4250	
WASP-53b	2.132	1.074	3.3098443	0.04101		transit		0.84	4953	
WASP-53c	16.35		2840	3.73		transit		0.84	4953	
WASP-81b	0.729	1.429	2.7164762	0.03908		transit		1.08	5870	
WASP-92b	0.805	1.461	2.1746742	0.0348	1871	transit	1700	1.19	6280	
WASP-93b	1.47	1.597	2.7325321	0.04211		transit	820	1.33	6700	
WASP-113b	0.475	1.409	4.54216875	0.05885	1496	transit	1200	1.32	5890	
WASP-114b	1.769	1.339	1.5487743	0.02851	2043	transit	1500	1.29	5940	
WASP-118b	0.514	1.44	4.0460435	0.05453		transit	820	1.32	6410	
WASP-119b	1.23	1.4	2.49979	0.0363	1600	transit	1090	1.02	5650	
WASP-124b	0.6	1.24	3.37265	0.0449	1400	transit	1410	1.07	6050	
WASP-126b	0.28	0.96	3.2888	0.0449	1480	transit	760	1.12	5800	
WASP-127b	0.18	1.37	4.178062	0.052		transit	330	1.08	5620	
WASP-129b	1	0.93	5.748145	0.0628	1100	transit	800	1	5900	
WASP-130b	1.23	0.89	11.55098	0.1012	833	transit	590	1.04	5625	
WASP-131b	0.27	1.22	5.322023	0.0607	1400	transit	820	1.06	6030	
WASP-132b	0.41	0.87	7.133521	0.067	763	transit	390	0.8	4775	Second planet discovered in 2022
WASP-133b	1.16	1.21	2.176423	0.0345	1790	transit	1780	1.16	5700	
WASP-136b	1.51	1.38	5.215357	0.0661		transit	530	1.41	6260	
WASP-138b	1.22	1.09	3.634433	0.0494		transit	1000	1.22	6272	
WASP-139b	0.117	0.8	5.924262	0.062	910	transit	750	0.92	5310	
WASP-140b	2.44	1.44	2.2359835	0.0323	1320	transit	590	0.9	5260	
WASP-141b	2.69	1.21	3.310651	0.0469	1540	transit	1900	1.25	5900	
WASP-142b	0.84	1.53	2.052868	0.0347	2000	transit	2700	1.33	6010	
WASP-157b	0.574	1.065	3.9516205	0.0529	1339	transit		1.26	5838	
XO-6b	4.4	2.07	3.7650007	0.0815	1577	transit	759.0	1.47	6720	
YBP 401 b	0.46		4.087			radial vel.		1.14	6165	Belongs to Messier 67

== Excluded objects and former candidate ==
The majority of exoplanet discoveries in 2016 were from a paper by Morton et al. that statistically validated over 1,000 Kepler planets. This statistical validation did not involve mass measurements, and some transiting objects validated as planets were later shown (or even previously known) to be small stars. Such cases include Kepler-469 (KOI-126), Kepler-470 (KOI-129), Kepler-486 (KOI-189), Kepler-488 (KOI-194), Kepler-503 (KOI-242), Kepler-628 (KOI-631), Kepler-699 (KOI-846), Kepler-706 (KOI-855), Kepler-807 (KOI-1288), Kepler-840 (KOI-1416), and Kepler-854 (KOI-1450). In another two cases, Kepler-492 (KOI-205) and Kepler-494 (KOI-219), the companions are brown dwarfs with masses about 40 times that of Jupiter.

HD 131399 Ab had been thought to be a massive directly imaged planet located in a trinary system. Later analysis showed that it is a background star instead.

== Specific exoplanet lists ==
Lists of exoplanets

- List of directly imaged exoplanets
- List of exoplanet extremes
- List of exoplanet firsts
- List of exoplanets discovered by the Kepler space telescope
- List of exoplanets observed during Kepler's K2 mission
- List of exoplanets discovered by the TESS mission
- List of terrestrial exoplanet candidates for atmosphere detection
- List of hottest exoplanets
- List of coldest exoplanets
- List of multiplanetary systems
- List of circumbinary planets
- List of nearest exoplanets
- List of nearest terrestrial exoplanet candidates
- List of potentially habitable exoplanets
- List of proper names of exoplanets
- List of largest exoplanets
- List of smallest exoplanets
- List of transiting exoplanets
- List of exoplanets and planetary debris around giant stars
- List of exoplanets and planetary debris around white dwarfs
- List of extrasolar planetary collisions

=== Lists of exoplanets by year of discovery ===
- List of exoplanets discovered before 2000 (31)
- List of exoplanets discovered between 2000–2009 (376)
- List of exoplanets discovered in 2010 (109)
- List of exoplanets discovered in 2011 (178)
- List of exoplanets discovered in 2012 (149)
- List of exoplanets discovered in 2013 (149)
- List of exoplanets discovered in 2014 (869)
- List of exoplanets discovered in 2015 (144)
- List of exoplanets discovered in 2016 (1497)
- List of exoplanets discovered in 2017 (152)
- List of exoplanets discovered in 2018 (300)
- List of exoplanets discovered in 2019 (169)
- List of exoplanets discovered in 2020 (256)
- List of exoplanets discovered in 2021 (253)
- List of exoplanets discovered in 2022 (312)
- List of exoplanets discovered in 2023 (304)
- List of exoplanets discovered in 2024 (284)
- List of exoplanets discovered in 2025 (239)
- List of exoplanets discovered in 2026 (351)
