= OGLE-2016-BLG-1928 =

Earth-sized rogue planet detected by microlensing

Discovery
- Discovered by: Mróz et al.
- Discovery site: Optical Gravitational Lensing Experiment
- Discovery date: 2020
- Detection method: Microlensing

Orbital characteristics
- Star: N/A

Physical characteristics
- Mass: 0.3 or 2 M_{🜨}

OGLE-2016-BLG-1928 is an exoplanet located in the constellation Sagittarius, discovered via gravitational microlensing. (Note: Constellation was inferred from exoplanet.eu's coordinates using this website.) It is likely to be a rogue (free-floating) planet, as no host star was detected within 8 astronomical units.

This likely free-floating planet has a mass of either 0.3 or 2 M_{🜨}, if it is located within the galactic disk or the galactic bulge, respectively. The former scenario is the most likely. Low-mass rogue planets like OGLE-2016-BLG-1928 are thought to be very common in the Milky Way, but few have been spotted as they are very hard to detect. It is believed that these planets have been ejected from their origin planetary systems.

== Discovery ==
An illustration of how the microlensing method works.

OGLE-2016-BLG-1928 was discovered through a gravitational microlensing event observed by the Optical Gravitational Lensing Experiment (OGLE) and Korea Microlensing Telescope Network (KMT-N) surveys. This event had the shortest duration of any observed, at just 41.5 minutes. The discovery was announced in 2020 by a team of astronomers led by Przemek Mroz. A microlensing event happens when the observer, the planet and a background star are aligned. The planet's gravitational effect magnifies, distorts and creates multiple images of the background star. Microlensing is a useful method for detecting planets that emit little or no radiation.

== See also ==
- List of exoplanets discovered in 2020
- OGLE-2005-BLG-390Lb
- OGLE-2012-BLG-0950Lb
