= Gliese 536 =

Star in the constellation Virgo

Observation data Epoch J2000 Equinox ICRS
- Constellation: Virgo
- Right ascension: 14^{h} 01^{m} 03.1882^{s}
- Declination: −02° 39′ 15.520″
- Apparent magnitude (V): +9.707

Characteristics
- Evolutionary stage: main sequence
- Spectral type: M0V
- B−V color index: 1.47

Astrometry
Radial velocity (R_{v})	−25.90±0.00 km/s
Proper motion (μ)	RA: −825.463 mas/yr Dec.: +598.433 mas/yr
Parallax (π)	95.9575±0.0253 mas
Distance	33.990 ± 0.009 ly (10.421 ± 0.003 pc)
Absolute magnitude (M_{V})	+9.7

Details
Mass	0.528±0.027 M_{☉}
Radius	0.529±0.022 R_{☉}
Luminosity	0.04437±0.00092 L_{☉}
Habitable zone inner limit	0.1756±0.0018 au
Habitable zone outer limit	0.3716±0.0038 au
Surface gravity (log g)	4.713±0.007 cgs
Temperature	3,641±88 K
Metallicity [Fe/H]	−0.08±0.09 dex
Rotation	43.9 days
Rotational velocity (v sin i)	2.0 km/s
Age	4.2±1.1 Gyr

Other designations
- BD−01°2892, GJ 536, HD 122303, HIP 68469, G 64-35, LHS 2842, LTT 5470, TYC 4978-501-1

Database references
SIMBAD	data

Gliese 536 is a red dwarf star in the constellation Virgo. It lies at a distance of approximately 34 light-years and has two known exoplanets.

== Planetary system ==
The two known exoplanets orbiting 536 were found from Doppler spectroscopy. Gliese 536 b was discovered in 2017, while Gliese 536 c was discovered in 2025. Based on their minimum masses (m sin i) of 6.37±0.38 and 5.89±0.70 M_{🜨}, both are thought to be either super-Earths or mini-Neptunes. The host star rotates at an angle of 58+16
−19° relative to Earth, and based on the assumption that the planets share this angle, their masses would be 7.6+2.3
−1.0 and 7.1+2.2
−1.2 M_{🜨}. For an inclination less than 5°, both would be gas giants.

The habitable zone spans from 0.176 to 0.372 astronomical units, so planet c is orbiting just below this zone. The equilibrium temperatures of Gliese 536 b and c are 451±15 and 291±10 K.

The Gliese 536 planetary system
Companion (in order from star)	Mass	Semimajor axis (AU)	Orbital period (days)	Eccentricity	Inclination (°)	Radius
b	≥6.37±0.38 M_{🜨}	0.0668±0.0012	8.70874±0.00056	0	—	—
c	≥5.89±0.70 M_{🜨}	0.1617±0.0028	32.761±0.015	0	—	—
