= Kepler-560b =

Extrasolar planet

Discovery
- Discovered by: Kepler space telescope
- Discovery date: 10 May 2016
- Detection method: Transit

Designations
- Alternative names: KOI-463.01, Kepler-560 Bb, KIC 8845205 b

Orbital characteristics
- Semi-major axis: 0.0899+0.0031 −0.0062 AU
- Eccentricity: 0.17
- Orbital period (sidereal): 18.4776196+0.0000130 −0.0000132 d
- Inclination: 89.606°+0.0031° −0.094°
- Star: Kepler-560 B

Physical characteristics
- Mean radius: 1.93+0.15 −0.14 R_{🜨}
- Temperature: 298+22 −32 K

Kepler-560b, also called Kepler-560 Bb, is a confirmed exoplanet orbiting the secondary star of the binary star system Kepler-560. It is 287 light-years away. Though not listed in the Habitable Exoplanets Catalog, one study gives the planet an 85% chance of being in the habitable zone.

Size comparison
Earth	Kepler-560b
	Exoplanet

== See also ==
- Kepler-705b
