= GJ 3998 =

Red dwarf

Observation data Epoch J2000 Equinox ICRS
- Constellation: Ophiuchus
- Right ascension: 17^{h} 16^{m} 00.63687^{s}
- Declination: +11° 03′ 27.6158″
- Apparent magnitude (V): 10.83

Characteristics
- Evolutionary stage: main sequence
- Spectral type: M1V
- Apparent magnitude (J): 7.634±0.021
- Apparent magnitude (H): 7.020±0.029
- Apparent magnitude (K): 6.816±0.016
- U−B color index: 1.183
- B−V color index: 1.510
- V−R color index: 0.970

Astrometry
Radial velocity (R_{v})	−45.62±0.14 km/s
Proper motion (μ)	RA: −137.435 mas/yr Dec.: −347.456 mas/yr
Parallax (π)	55.0169±0.0287 mas
Distance	59.28 ± 0.03 ly (18.176 ± 0.009 pc)
Absolute magnitude (M_{V})	9.58

Details
Mass	0.52±0.05 M_{☉}
Radius	0.50±0.05 R_{☉}
Luminosity	0.041±0.008 L_{☉}
Surface gravity (log g)	4.75±0.04 cgs
Temperature	3726±68 K
Metallicity [Fe/H]	−0.13±0.09 dex
Rotation	30.2±0.3 d
Rotational velocity (v sin i)	0.93±0.55 km/s
Age	8.38±4.06 Gyr

Other designations
- BD+11 3149, GJ 3998, HIP 84460, G 139-23, L 1205-67, LTT 15111, TYC 982-121-1

Database references
SIMBAD	data
Exoplanet Archive	data
ARICNS	data

GJ 3998 is a red dwarf star located 59.3 light-years (18.2 parsecs) away in the constellation Ophiuchus. It has about half the mass and radius of the Sun, and only 4% of its luminosity. Its rotation period is 30 days.

GJ 3998 hosts a system of three known planets, all super-Earth-mass planets detected by the radial velocity method. The outermost planet, with a minimum mass about six times the mass of Earth, orbits within the optimistic habitable zone. The star rotates with an inclination of >30° to the plane of the sky; if the planetary orbits are coplanar with the star, their true masses are at most twice their minimum masses.

The two inner planets were found in 2016, but were questioned by a 2022 study, which argued that the radial velocity signals may instead be due to intrinsic stellar activity. The third planet was found by a 2025 follow-up study by the original discovery team, who did a series of tests on stellar activity signals that they believe validate all three planets.

The GJ 3998 planetary system
Companion (in order from star)	Mass	Semimajor axis (AU)	Orbital period (days)	Eccentricity	Inclination (°)	Radius
b	≥2.50+0.30 −0.29 M_{🜨}	0.030±0.001	2.65033+0.00022 −0.00019	0	—	—
c	≥6.82+0.78 −0.75 M_{🜨}	0.090±0.003	13.727+0.003 −0.004	0	—	—
d	≥6.07+1.00 −0.96 M_{🜨}	0.189±0.006	41.78±0.05	0	—	—
