= K2-58 =

Star in the constellation Aquarius

Observation data Epoch J2000 Equinox J2000
- Constellation: Aquarius
- Right ascension: 22^{h} 15^{m} 17.2365^{s}
- Declination: −14° 02′ 59.313″
- Apparent magnitude (V): 12.13

Characteristics
- Evolutionary stage: Main sequence
- Spectral type: K0

Astrometry
Radial velocity (R_{v})	6.48±0.42 km/s
Proper motion (μ)	RA: 4.67±0.02 mas/yr Dec.: -11.11±0.02 mas/yr
Parallax (π)	5.4932±0.0194 mas
Distance	594 ± 2 ly (182.0 ± 0.6 pc)

Details
Mass	0.858^{+0.022}_{−0.027} M_{☉}
Radius	0.803^{+0.034}_{−0.020} R_{☉}
Luminosity	0.57 L_{☉}
Surface gravity (log g)	4.5 cgs
Temperature	5,038 K
Metallicity [Fe/H]	0.25 dex
Rotational velocity (v sin i)	2.2±0.5 km/s
Age	5.1+3.1 −2.6 Gyr

Other designations
- EPIC 206026904, 2MASS J22151722-1402593, Gaia DR3 2599975224481836672

Database references
SIMBAD	data
Exoplanet Archive	data

K2-58 (also designated as EPIC 206026904) is a G-type main-sequence star in the constellation of Aquarius, approximately 596 light-years from the Solar System. The star is metal-rich, having 155% of the Solar abundance of elements heavier than helium. The star is located in a region where a hypothetical observer in the K2-58 system can see Venus transiting the Sun.

== Planetary system ==
The planetary system has three confirmed exoplanets, named K2-58 b, K2-58 c, and K2-58 d, discovered in 2016.

The K2-58 planetary system
Companion (in order from star)	Mass	Semimajor axis (AU)	Orbital period (days)	Eccentricity	Inclination (°)	Radius
c	—	0.0350	2.53726	—	86.1^{+2.8}_{−7.3}	1.62 R_{🜨}
b	—	0.0692	7.05254	—	88.9^{+0.8}_{−1.6}	2.68 R_{🜨}
d	—	0.1517	22.8827	—	89.43^{+0.41}_{−0.81}	1.71 R_{🜨}
