= HD 133131 =

Binary star in the constellation Libra

Observation data Epoch J2000 Equinox ICRS
- Constellation: Libra
- A
- Right ascension: 15^{h} 03^{m} 35.44599^{s}
- Declination: −27° 50′ 33.2195″
- Apparent magnitude (V): 8.40
- B
- Right ascension: 15^{h} 03^{m} 35.80805^{s}
- Declination: −27° 50′ 27.5843″
- Apparent magnitude (V): 8.42

Characteristics

A
- Evolutionary stage: main sequence
- Spectral type: G2V
- B−V color index: +0.622

B
- Evolutionary stage: main sequence
- Spectral type: G2V
- B−V color index: +0.622

Astrometry

A
Radial velocity (R_{v})	−16.37±0.19 km/s
Proper motion (μ)	RA: +156.227 mas/yr Dec.: −133.767 mas/yr
Parallax (π)	19.4325±0.0265 mas
Distance	167.8 ± 0.2 ly (51.46 ± 0.07 pc)

B
Radial velocity (R_{v})	−15.70±0.18 km/s
Proper motion (μ)	RA: +159.010 mas/yr Dec.: −139.133 mas/yr
Parallax (π)	19.4131±0.0293 mas
Distance	168.0 ± 0.3 ly (51.51 ± 0.08 pc)

Orbit
Period (P)	~4240 yr

Details

HD 133131A
Mass	0.95 M_{☉}
Radius	1.00 R_{☉}
Luminosity	0.96 L_{☉}
Surface gravity (log g)	4.39±0.050 cgs
Temperature	5,799±19 K
Metallicity [Fe/H]	−0.306±0.016 dex
Rotation	23 days
Rotational velocity (v sin i)	4.0 km/s
Age	6.3 Gyr

HD 133131B
Mass	0.93 M_{☉}
Radius	1.01 R_{☉}
Luminosity	0.98 L_{☉}
Surface gravity (log g)	4.41±0.045 cgs
Temperature	5,805±15 K
Metallicity [Fe/H]	−0.281±0.013 dex
Rotation	22 days
Rotational velocity (v sin i)	7.0 km/s
Age	5.9 Gyr

Other designations
- CPD−27°5116, HD 133131, HIP 73674
- HD 133131A: SAO 183128, TYC 6756-1541-1, 2MASS J15033543-2750330
- HD 133131B: SAO 183129, TYC 6756-867-1, 2MASS J15033579-2750273

Database references
SIMBAD	The system
- A
- B
Exoplanet Archive	data

HD 133131 is a binary star in the constellation of Libra. It is 168 light-years (51.5 parsecs) away from the Sun. It consists of two G-type main-sequence stars; neither are bright enough to be seen with the naked eye. The star was first catalogued as a binary in 1972.

Both components, HD 133131 A and B, are very similar to the Sun but are far older, about 6 billion years old. They also have low metallicities (50% of solar abundance), and HD 133131A is additionally depleted in heavy elements compared to HD 133131B, indicating a possibly past planetary engulfment event for HD 133131 B.

== Planetary systems ==
In 2016, two planets orbiting HD 133131A and one planet orbiting HD 133131B were discovered utilizing the radial velocity method. All three are long-period giant planets.

The HD 133131A planetary system
Companion (in order from star)	Mass	Semimajor axis (AU)	Orbital period (days)	Eccentricity	Inclination (°)	Radius
b	≥1.43 M_{J}	1.44	649	0.32	—	—
c	≥0.63 M_{J}	4.79	3925	0.20	—	—

The HD 133131B planetary system
Companion (in order from star)	Mass	Semimajor axis (AU)	Orbital period (days)	Eccentricity	Inclination (°)	Radius
b	≥2.50 M_{J}	6.40	6119	0.62	—	—

== See also ==
Other systems with multiple planet-hosting stars:

- 55 Cancri
- HD 20781 & HD 20782
- TOI-2267
- WASP-94
- XO-2
- Struve 2398
