= K2-38b =

Exoplanet

Discovery
- Discovery site: Kepler Space Observatory
- Discovery date: 2016
- Detection method: Transit

Orbital characteristics
- Semi-major axis: 0.04994^{+0.00048}_{−0.00049} AU
- Eccentricity: 0.197^{+0.067}_{−0.060}
- Orbital period (sidereal): 4.01593 (± 0.0005) d
- Inclination: 88.36 ^{+0.17}_{−0.15}
- Star: K2-38

Physical characteristics
- Mean radius: 1.54±0.14 R_{🜨}
- Mass: 7.3^{+1.1}_{−1.0} M_{🜨}
- Mean density: 11.0^{+5.8}_{−3.7} g cm^{−3}
- Surface gravity: 3.08^{+1.2}_{−0.74} g
- Temperature: 1,266 K (993 °C; 1,819 °F)

K2-38b, also designated EPIC 204221263 b, is a massive rocky exoplanet closely orbiting a Sun-like star and is one of the densest planets ever found. Discovered in 2016 by Crossfield et al. and later characterized by Sinukoff et al., K2-38b is a rocky super-Earth about 55% larger than Earth (nearly 20,000 km wide) but about 12 times more massive (around 7.2*10^25 kg, a bit less than Uranus) indicating a composition rich in iron and an extremely high surface gravity. The planet is within K2 Campaign 2, in the constellation Scorpius.

== Characteristics ==
=== Mass, radius, and temperature ===
K2-38b is a massive rocky exoplanet significantly larger and more massive than Earth. It has a radius of 1.55 R_{🜨}, close to the 1.6 R_{🜨} limit where planets would begin to accumulate thick hydrogen-helium atmospheres and become something similar to a Mini-Neptune. However, K2-38b is instead a very dense terrestrial planet. Initially it was believed planet is made almost entirely of iron, with a mass of about 12.0 M_{🜨} and a density of about 17.5 g/cm^{3}. This made it one of the densest exoplanets ever discovered. Measurement in 2020 have resulted in lower mass of 7.3^{+1.1}_{−1.0} M_{🜨}, and less extreme constraints on composition though.

=== Orbit ===
K2-38b has a very tight orbit around its host star. The planet takes just 4 days to complete a single orbit at a distance of about 0.05 AU. For comparison, Mercury orbits every 88 days at 0.38 AU from the Sun. The eccentricity of K2-38b's orbit is slightly larger than that of Mars.

=== Host star ===
The parent star K2-38 is a G2 main-sequence star, similar to our own Sun. It is 1.10 R_{☉} and 1.07 M_{☉}, with a temperature of 5757 K and an unknown age. For comparison, the Sun has a temperature of 5778 K and is about 4.5 billion years old.

The visual magnitude of K2-38, or how bright it appears to the human eye, is 11.39. Therefore, it is far too dim to be seen without a telescope.

== See also ==
- Mega-Earth
