= Gliese 536 b =

Super-Earth orbiting the red dwarf star GJ 536

Discovery
- Discovered by: Suárez Mascareño et al.
- Discovery date: Nov. 2016
- Detection method: Radial Velocity

Orbital characteristics
- Semi-major axis: 0.067±0.01 AU
- Eccentricity: 0.119+0.125 −0.032
- Orbital period (sidereal): 8.708+0.002 −0.001 d
- Time of periastron: 2451410.730
- Argument of periastron: 19.2+36.9 −42.8
- Semi-amplitude: 3.12+0.36 −0.19
- Star: Gliese 536

Physical characteristics
- Mass: 6.52+0.69 −0.40 M_{🜨}

Gliese 536 b also known as GJ 536 b is a nearby Super-Earth sized exoplanet orbiting interior to the circumstellar habitable zone of the red dwarf (M1) star Gliese 536 every 8.7 days. Due to its short orbital period it could help with future studies of biological activity on exoplanets.

This exoplanet is given the title Super-Earth due to its immense size which is more than five times greater than the Earth. Like many other rocky exoplanets, Gliese 536 b should be part of a large planetary group. Astronomers are still in search of other planets that are in orbit of star Gliese 536. But this planet is hotter than Venus, and although the planet is hotter than it, it may be similar to Venus.
