= K2-32 =

Yellowish-hued star in the constellation Ophiuchus

Observation data Epoch J2000 Equinox ICRS
- Constellation: Ophiuchus
- Right ascension: 16^{h} 49^{m} 42.2602^{s}
- Declination: −19° 32′ 34.151″
- Apparent magnitude (V): 12.31±0.02

Characteristics
- Spectral type: G9V
- Apparent magnitude (J): 10.404±0.024
- Apparent magnitude (H): 9.993±0.025
- Apparent magnitude (K): 9.821±0.019
- Variable type: Planetary transit variable

Astrometry
Radial velocity (R_{v})	−1.82±0.14 km/s
Proper motion (μ)	RA: −16.662(18) mas/yr Dec.: −53.564(13) mas/yr
Parallax (π)	6.3939±0.0153 mas
Distance	510 ± 1 ly (156.4 ± 0.4 pc)

Details
Mass	0.856±0.028 M_{☉}
Radius	0.845+0.044 −0.035 R_{☉}
Surface gravity (log g)	4.49±0.05 cgs
Temperature	5275±60 K
Metallicity [Fe/H]	−0.02±0.04 dex
Rotational velocity (v sin i)	0.7 km/s
Age	7.9±4.5 Gyr

Other designations
- EPIC 205071984, 2MASS J16494226-1932340, Gaia DR2 4130539180358512768

Database references
SIMBAD	data
Exoplanet Archive	data

K2-32 is a G9-type main sequence star slightly smaller and less massive than the sun. Four confirmed transiting exoplanets are known to orbit this star. A study of atmospheric escape from the planet K2-32b caused by high-energy stellar irradiation indicates that the star has always been a very slow rotator.

== Planetary system ==
=== Discovery ===
The star K2-32 was initially found to have three transiting planet candidates by Andrew Vanderburg and collaborators in 2016. The innermost planet candidate, at that time, K2-32b was confirmed using radial velocity measurements made with the Keck telescope. Confirmation of planets c and d was made by Sinukoff et al. using adaptive optics imaging and computer analysis to eliminate possible false positives.

The Earth-sized planet K2-32e was discovered and validated by René Heller and team in 2019.

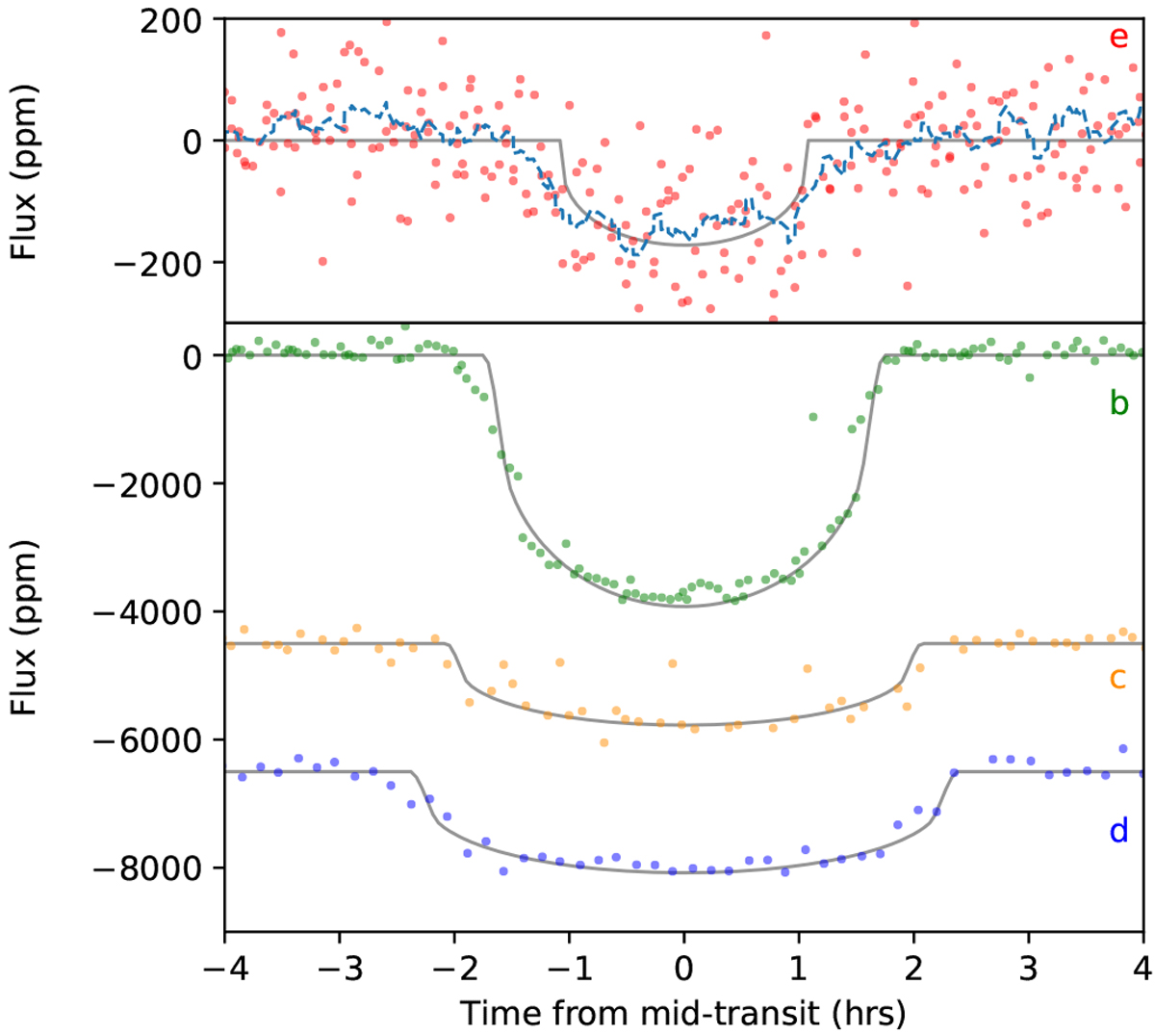
Transit light curves of all four planets orbiting the star K2-32.

=== Characteristics ===
With periods of 4.34, 8.99, 20.66 and 31.71 days the four planets orbits are very close to a 1:2:5:7 orbital resonance chain. The densities of planets b, c, and d are between those of Saturn and Neptune, which suggests large and massive atmospheres. The planet K2-32e with a radius almost identical to that of the Earth is almost certainly a terrestrial planet. All four planets are well inside even the optimistic inner boundary of the habitable zone located at 0.58 astronomical units.

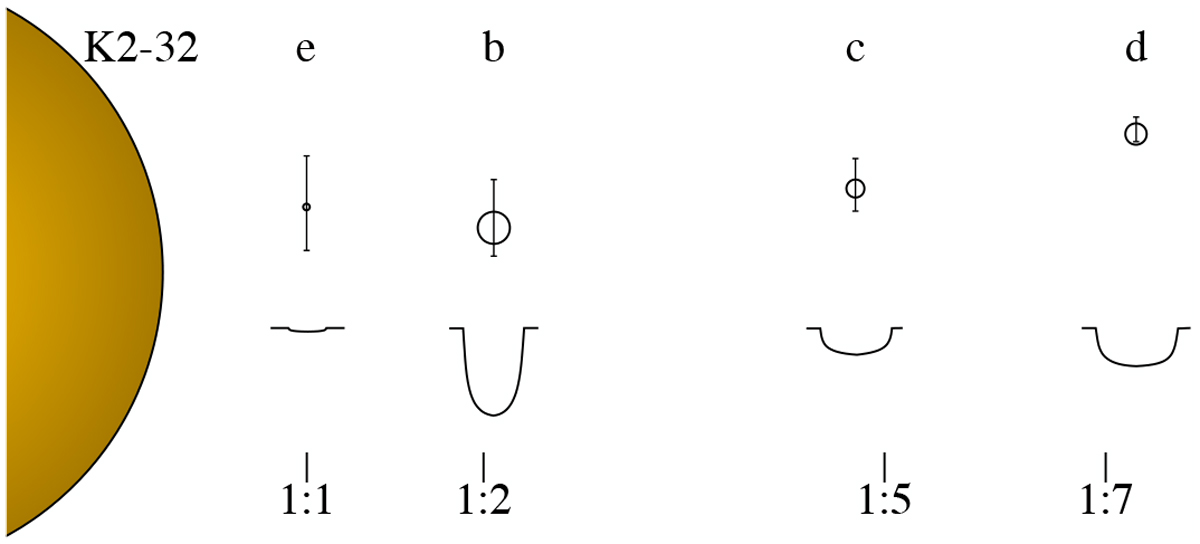
Planetary system of the star K2-32 showing planetary radii and orbital resonances.

The K2-32 planetary system
Companion (in order from star)	Mass	Semimajor axis (AU)	Orbital period (days)	Eccentricity	Inclination (°)	Radius
e	2.1^{+1.3}_{−1.1} M_{🜨}	0.04899^{+0.00041}_{−0.00038}	4.34934±0.00039	0.043^{+0.048}_{−0.030}	89.0±0.7	1.212^{+0.052}_{−0.046} R_{🜨}
b	15.0^{+1.8}_{−1.7} M_{🜨}	0.07950^{+0.00066}_{−0.00062}	8.992±0.00008	0.03^{+0.032}_{−0.02}	89.0^{+0.5}_{−0.3}	5.299±0.191 R_{🜨}
c	8.1±2.4 M_{🜨}	0.13843^{+0.00115}_{−0.00108}	20.66093^{+0.00080}_{−0.00079}	0.049^{+0.046}_{−0.035}	89.4^{+0.3}_{−0.2}	2.134^{+0.123}_{−0.102} R_{🜨}
d	6.7±2.5 M_{🜨}	0.18422^{+0.00152}_{−0.00144}	31.71701^{+0.00101}_{−0.00096}	0.05^{+0.053}_{−0.035}	89.4±0.1	3.484^{+0.112}_{−0.129} R_{🜨}
