= OGLE-2012-BLG-0950Lb =

Sub-Saturn exoplanet 8,500 light years away

Discovery
- Discovery date: 2016-12-14
- Detection method: Gravitational microlensing

Orbital characteristics
- Mean orbit radius: 2.6 AU
- Star: OGLE-2012-BLG-0950L

Physical characteristics
- Mean radius: 6.5 R_{🜨}
- Mass: 35–39 M_{🜨}
- Mean density: 0.7–0.8 g/cm^{3}

OGLE-2012-BLG-0950Lb is a sub-Saturn (super-Neptune)-type planet 2,600 parsecs (8,500 ly) away with 39 or 35 Earth masses. This type of planet was once thought to be extremely rare because of runaway gas accretion, which would create a gap between 4 and 8 Earth radii or 20 and 80 Earth masses, peaking around 32-64 Earth masses. The planet is 2.6 AU from its star. It is likely near-impossible to know much else about the planet's properties (or its star's) because it was detected by gravitational microlensing. The mass of the host star is approximately 0.56 solar masses (consistent with an M0-0.5V-type star). This exoplanet was the first to have its mass found out using only microlens parallax and lens flux.

According to microlensing and Kepler data, analogues to this world should be common, showing that the Solar System is not necessarily a perfect model for planetary formation and the runaway gas accretion model may be incorrect or incomplete. This has implications for habitability because gas/ice giants like Jupiter and Neptune greatly influenced the Earth's water content (see Grand Tack hypothesis).

== Composition ==
Sub-Saturns have a wide range of makeups, from puffy planets to large-core worlds. With a radius of 6.5 Earth radii (predicted based on mass-radius relationships), the density would be 0.87 (39 Earth masses) or 0.7 g/cm^{3} (35 Earth masses), implying a Saturn-like composition closer to a standard gas giant than an ice giant. Tholins, a building block of life, are very common in these types of planets as well as the universe as a whole and thus may be present here.

== See also ==
- Mini-Neptune
- Super-Jupiter
