= List of exoplanets discovered in 2025 =

This list of exoplanets discovered in 2025 is a list of confirmed exoplanets that were first reported in 2025. For exoplanets detected only by radial velocity, the listed value for mass is a lower limit. See Minimum mass for more information.

| Name | Mass (M_{J}) | Radius (R_{J}) | Period (days) | Semi-major axis (AU) | Temp. (K) | Discovery method | Distance (ly) | Host star mass (M_{☉}) | Host star temp. (K) | Remarks |
|---|---|---|---|---|---|---|---|---|---|---|
| AT2021uey b | 1.34^{+0.45}_{−0.50} | | 4,170^{+2,910}_{−1,710} | 4.01^{+1.68}_{−1.34} | | microlensing | 3,390^{+2,410}_{−1,440} | 0.49^{+0.16}_{−0.18} | 3,680^{+307}_{−204} | |
| Barnard's Star c | 0.00105±0.00009 | | 4.1244±0.0006 | 0.0274±0.0004 | 400 | radial vel. | 5.9629±0.0004 | 0.162±0.007 | 3,195±28 | |
| Barnard's Star d | 0.000827±0.000076 | | 2.3402±0.0003 | 0.0188±0.0003 | 483 | radial vel. | 5.9629±0.0004 | 0.162±0.007 | 3,195±28 | |
| Barnard's Star e | 0.000607±0.000104 | | 6.7392±0.0030 | 0.0381±0.0005 | 340 | radial vel. | 5.9629±0.0004 | 0.162±0.007 | 3,195±28 | |
| BEBOP-3 b | 0.558^{+0.051}_{−0.048} | | 547.0^{+6.2}_{−7.6} | 1.444±0.017 | | radial vel. | 385.13±0.58 | 1.3445 (Note: Sum of masses of the system) | 6,033 (Note: Temperature of component A) | A circumbinary planet. |
| BD+05 4868 Ab | <0.020 | | 1.271869±0.000001 | 0.0208±0.0003 | 1,820±45 | transit | 142.4±0.1 | 0.70±0.02 | 4,596^{+65}_{−64} | A disintegrating planet with a comet-like tail. |
| G 192-15 b | 0.00324±0.00057 | | 2.27476^{+0.00026}_{−0.00028} | 0.01723^{+0.00038}_{−0.00039} | 453.6^{+8.8}_{−8.5} | radial vel. | 31.086±0.022 | 0.132±0.009 | | Also known as GJ 3380 b. |
| G 192-15 c | 0.0450^{+0.0050}_{−0.0047} | | 1,219^{+13}_{−11} | 1.137^{+0.026}_{−0.027} | 55.9±1.1 | radial vel. | 31.086±0.022 | 0.132±0.009 | | Also known as GJ 3380 c. |
| G 261-6 b | 0.00431^{+0.00072}_{−0.00069} | | 5.4536^{+0.0031}_{−0.0032} | 0.02971^{+0.00087}_{−0.00093} | 322.3^{+9.9}_{−9.7} | radial vel. | 34.66±0.021 | 0.118±0.011 | | |
| G 268-110 b | 0.00478±0.00079 | | 1.432630^{+0.000072}_{−0.000076} | 0.01283^{+0.00028}_{−0.00029} | 534^{+12}_{−11} | radial vel. | 31.86 | 0.137±0.009 | | |
| Gliese 251 c | 0.01207 | | 53.647±0.044 | 0.196±0.014 | | radial vel. | 18.21 | 0.360±0.015 | 3342±24 | Potentially habitable. |
| Gl 410 b | 0.0249±0.0038 | | 6.02 | 0.0531±0.0007 | | radial vel. | 38.9 | 0.55±0.02 | 3,842±31 | Two additional planets in the same system are suspected. |
| GJ 536 c | 0.01853±0.0022 | | 32.76 | 0.1617±0.003 | 290 | radial vel. | 32.71 | 0.52±0.05 | 3685±68 | |
| GJ 2126 b | 1.3^{+0.2}_{−0.1} | | 272.7 | 0.71±0.03 | | radial vel. | 124.3±0.4 | 0.65^{+0.09}_{−0.07} | 4,159±130 | |
| GJ 3998 d | 0.0191^{+0.00315}_{−0.00302} | | 41.78±0.05 | 0.189±0.006 | | radial vel. | 58.056±2.283 | 0.52±0.05 | 3726±68 | |
| GJ 508.2 b | 1.85 | | ~5300 | 4.85 | | radial vel. | 54.3 | 0.54±0.12 | 3,720±12 | |
| GJ 9773 b | 0.543 | | 2965 | 2.921±0.045 | | radial vel. | 51.8 | 0.358±0.011 | 3,528±25 | |
| HD 85426 c | 0.0324^{+0.0050}_{−0.0047} | | 35.73^{+0.09}_{−0.10} | 0.2118^{+0.0050}_{−0.0044} (Note: Calculated from R_{★} = 1.1303±0.0069 R_{☉} and a/R_{★} = 40.3+0.7 −0.6.) | 640±9 | radial vel. | 175.3 | 0.991^{+0.027}_{−0.020} | 5,746±59 | Star also known as TOI-1774. An additional planet is suspected in the system. |
| HD 87816 b | 6.74±0.13 | | 484.17^{+0.13}_{−0.12} | 1.618±0.0003 | | radial vel. | 434.585±1.761 | 2.41±0.10 | 4989±46 | Host star also known as R Velorum. |
| HD 87816 c | 12.20^{+2.15}_{−1.59} | | 7,596^{+1140}_{−535} | 10.14^{+1.0}_{−0.5} | | radial vel. | 434.585±1.761 | 2.41±0.10 | 4989±46 | |
| HD 94890 b | 2.13^{+0.16}_{−0.17} | | 824.61^{+5.02}_{−4.80} | 2.07±0.001 | | radial vel. | 201.236±2.355 | 1.740±0.196 | 4867±38 | Host star also known as iota Antliae. |
| HD 94890 c | 8.91^{+0.24}_{−0.25} | | 2492.19^{+14.72}_{−13.94} | 4.33±0.02 | | radial vel. | 201.236±2.355 | 1.740±0.196 | 4867±38 | |
| HD 102888 b | 5.69 | | 252 | 1.05±0.001 | | radial vel. | 412.6 | 2.42±0.06 | 4,990±39 | |
| HD 135344 Ab | 10.0^{+1.4}_{−1.9} | 1.45^{+0.06}_{−0.03} | | 16.5^{+2.8}_{−2.0} | 1,585^{+82}_{−73} | imaging | 440 | 1.5 | 9,540±100 | |
| HD 143811 AB b | 5.6±1.1 | 1.41±0.03 – 1.7 ^{+0.7}_{−0.4} | 117000 ^{+91000}_{−31000} | 63.88 | 1042 | imaging | 446.4 | 2.5 | 6,575±325 | A circumbinary planet. |
| HD 224018 b | 0.0129±0.0025 | 0.0812^{+0.0036}_{−0.033} | 10.6413±0.0028 | 0.0952±0.002 | 968±19 | transit | 347.3 ± 0.8 | 1.013^{+0.069}_{−0.061} | 5784±60 | |
| HD 224018 c | 0.0327^{+0.0041}_{−0.0035} | 0.2159^{+0.0062}_{−0.0071} | 36.57669^{+0.00019}_{−0.00017} | 0.217±0.005 | 641±12 | transit | 347.3 ± 0.8 | 1.013^{+0.069}_{−0.061} | 5784±60 | |
| HD 224018 d | 0.0132^{+0.0057}_{−0.0050} | 0.214±0.009 | 138.0731^{+27.6127}_{−0.0050} | 0.53^{+0.06}_{−0.02} | 411^{+11}_{−21} | transit | 347.3 ± 0.8 | 1.013^{+0.069}_{−0.061} | 5784±60 | |
| K2-157 c | 0.09670±0.00600 | | 25.942^{+0.045}_{−0.044} | 0.165±0.0018 | 587 | radial vel. | 973.589 ^{+14.970}_{−14.532} | 0.890±0.029 | 5334±64 | |
| K2-157 d | 0.0732±0.0077 | | 66.50^{+0.71}_{−0.59} | 0.309±0.0038 | 429 | radial vel. | 973.589 ^{+14.970}_{−14.532} | 0.890±0.029 | 5334±64 | |
| Kepler-139 f | 0.113±0.0315 | | 355±2 | | | radial vel. + timing | 1,289.78±13.89 | 1.08 | 5,594±100 | |
| Kepler-279 e | 0.176^{+0.0189}_{−0.0154} | 0.310±0.0482 | ~98.35 | | | transit | 3,487.26±74.07 | 1.10^{+0.16}_{−0.13} | 6,363±259 | |
| Kepler-289 e | 0.0547^{+0.00409}_{−0.00377} | 0.286^{+0.00437}_{−0.00259} | ~330 | | | transit | 2,283.09±45.66 | 1.08±0.02 | 5,990±38 | |
| Kepler-725 c | 0.031 | | 207.5 | 0.674±0.002 | | timing | 2474±45 | 0.91 | 5,293±122 | Partially in habitable zone. |
| KMT-2017-BLG-2197L b | 8.84^{+8.3}_{−4.9} | | | 15.9^{+2.1}_{−2.7} | | microlensing | 25,400^{+3,300}_{−4,300} | 0.36^{+0.34}_{−0.2} | | |
| KMT-2019-BLG-0578L b | 1.2^{+1.2}_{−0.6} | | | 1.2±0.2 or 2.0±0.3 | | microlensing | 23,810^{+2,280}_{−2,610} | 0.28^{+0.28}_{−0.14} | | |
| KMT-2021-BLG-0736L b | 0.0661^{+0.0409}_{−0.0315} | | | 4.0^{+0.9}_{−0.8} | | microlensing | 22,830^{+2,610}_{−4,890} | 0.60^{+0.37}_{−0.29} | | |
| KMT-2022-BLG-1790L b | 1.73^{+0.95}_{−0.9} | | | 5.25^{+0.75}_{−1.0} | | microlensing | 21,100^{+3,000}_{−4,200} | 0.58^{+0.32}_{−0.3} | | |
| KMT-2022-BLG-2076L b | 0.88±0.46 | | | 5.67±1.58 | | microlensing | 18,200^{+4,100}_{−5,000} | 0.67±0.35 | | |
| KMT-2023-BLG-0119L b | 0.2634^{+0.16822}_{−0.14396} | | | 3.14^{+1.32}_{−1.33} or 4.01^{+1.69}_{−1.70} | | microlensing | 10,240^{+5,510}_{−5,540} | 0.71^{+0.45}_{−0.39} | | |
| KMT-2023-BLG-1896L b | 0.0515^{+0.03087}_{−0.02656} | | | 2.86^{+1.12}_{−1.02} or 4.62^{+1.81}_{−1.94} | | microlensing | 17,900^{+7,000}_{−7,500} | 0.72^{+0.43}_{−0.37} | | |
| KMT-2023-BLG-2209L b | 0.80±0.38 | | | 5.31^{+0.95}_{−1.1} | | microlensing | 18,200^{+5,000}_{−5,700} | 0.73±0.35 | | |
| KMT-2024-BLG-0404Lb | 0.0544^{+0.0802}_{−0.0277} | | | 0.34±0.05 | | microlensing | 23,510^{+3,030}_{−3,160} | 0.09^{+0.133}_{−0.046} | | Also a brown dwarf exists in the system |
| KMT-2024-BLG-1209L b | 2.64^{+1.57}_{−1.16} | | | 2.51^{+1.50}_{−1.10} | | microlensing | 12,800^{+6,600}_{−4,600} | 0.77^{+0.46}_{−0.34} | | |
| KOBE-1 b | 0.0277±0.0024 | | 8.5399^{+0.0037}_{−0.0036} | 0.07006±0.00043 | 594.4±5.3 | radial vel. | 78.19 ± 0.09 | 0.629±0.017 | 4135±36 | |
| KOBE-1 c | 0.039±0.0035 | | 29.671^{+0.050}_{−0.052} | 0.16071±0.00099 | 392.5±3.5 | radial vel. | 78.19 ± 0.09 | 0.629±0.017 | 4135±36 | |
| KOI-134 b | 1.09^{+0.12}_{−0.08} | 1.074±0.017 | 67.1277^{+0.0045}_{−0.0057} | 0.363^{+0.011}_{−0.013} | 659^{+35}_{−46} | transit | 3781.073 ± 54.531 | 1.407±0.043 | 6160±130 | |
| KOI-134 c | 0.220^{+0.017}_{−0.021} | | 33.950^{+0.013}_{−0.020} | 0.2305^{+0.0069}_{−0.0081} | | timing | 3781.073 ± 54.531 | 1.407±0.043 | 6160±130 | |
| L 98-59 f | 0.00934 | | 23.07 | 0.1053±0.0024 | | radial vel. | 34.6 | 0.32±0.03 | 3,415±135 | Potentially habitable |
| MOA-2022-BLG-033L b | 0.0382^{+0.0296}_{−0.0197} | | | 2.15^{+1.17}_{−0.75} or 2.31^{+1.27}_{−0.81} | | microlensing | 6,000^{+3,260}_{−2,640} | 0.51^{+0.39}_{−0.26} | | |
| MOA-2022-BLG-091L b | 3.59^{+2.00}_{−1.67} | | | 2.67^{+1.45}_{−1.24} to 3.63^{+1.30}_{−1.31} | | microlensing | 13,900^{+4,960}_{−4,990} | 0.75^{+0.42}_{−0.35} | | |
| HD 196067 c | 0.03272±0.00437 | | 4.601088±0.000192 | | | radial vel. | 130.3 ± 0.1 | 1.16^{+0.13}_{−0.09} | 6072^{+83}_{−76} | Host star Also known as Mu^{2} Octantis A. |
| OGLE-2016-BLG-0007L b | 0.00415^{+0.0028}_{−0.0022} | | | 10.1^{+3.8}_{−3.4} | | microlensing | 14,020^{+3590}_{−4570} | 0.6^{+0.4}_{−0.3} | | |
| Ross 176 b | 0.01438±0.0028 | 0.1642±0.0071 | 5.00663±0.00008 | 0.0464±0.001 | 682 | transit | 151.7 | 0.58±0.02 | 4,061±70 | |
| TIC 88785435 b | | 0.449±0.019 | 10.508843 | 0.08432±0.00068 | 635±16 | transit | 398.2±0.8 | 0.724±0.017 | 3,998±95 | |
| TOI-201 c | 14.2±2.0 | 0.99±0.017 | 2,800^{+360}_{−210} | 4.28^{+0.36}_{−0.2} | | timing + transit | 372.5 | 1.316±0.027 | 6,394±75 | |
| TOI-333 b | 0.0632±0.0076 | 0.3801±0.0098 | 3.785250±0.000006 | 0.049±0.001 | 1445 | transit | 1132 | 1.2±0.1 | 6,241±73 | |
| TOI-512 b | 0.01123^{+0.00167}_{−0.00173} | 0.1374±0.0089 | 7.18886^{+0.000069}_{−0.000077} | | 1,009±29 | transit | 219.16±0.14 | 0.74±0.03 | 5,277±67 | |
| TOI-771 c | 0.00903 | | 7.61 | 0.046±0.002 | 365 | radial vel. | 82.45 | 0.22±0.024 | 3,201±100 | |
| TOI-1117 b | 0.028±0.003 | 0.219^{+0.012}_{−0.011} | 2.22816±0.00001 | 0.0330±0.0002 | 1,538±21 | transit | 544 ± 1 | 0.97±0.02 | 5635±62 | |
| TOI-1117 c | 0.0276^{+0.0037}_{−0.0038} | | 4.579±0.004 | 0.0534±0.0003 | 1,210±16 | radial vel. | 544 ± 1 | 0.97±0.02 | 5635±62 | |
| TOI-1117 d | 0.0337±0.0050 | | 8.665±0.011 | 0.0817±0.0006 | 978±13 | radial vel. | 544 ± 1 | 0.97±0.02 | 5635±62 | |
| TOI-1203 b | 0.0110±0.0010 | 0.1356^{+0.0040}_{−0.0041} | 4.1572888 | 0.04869^{+0.00094}_{−−0.00095} | 1361.2^{+18.8}_{−18.4} | transit | 211.982 ^{+0.620}_{−0.617} | 0.886±0.036 | 5737±62 | An old thick disk star. The fourth planet in the system, TOI-1203 d, was already validated in 2020. |
| TOI-1203 c | 0.0172±0.0016 | | 13.0766^{+0.0079}_{−0.0072} | | | radial vel. | 211.982 ^{+0.620}_{−0.617} | 0.886±0.036 | 5737±62 | |
| TOI-1203 e | 0.1325^{+0.0058}_{−0.0056} | | 204.59^{+0.67}_{−0.63} | | | radial vel. | 211.982 ^{+0.620}_{−0.617} | 0.886±0.036 | 5737±62 | |
| TOI-1453 b | 0.00390^{+0.00208}_{−0.00204} | 0.105^{+0.00526}_{−0.00500} | 4.3135225^{+0.0000118}_{−0.0000092} | | | transit | 257.288±0.209 | 0.715±0.035 | 4,975±68 | |
| TOI-1453 c | 0.00928^{+0.00261}_{−0.00264} | 0.198±0.00848 | 6.5886982 | | | transit | 257.288±0.209 | 0.715±0.035 | 4,975±68 | |
| TOI-1846 b | 0.01385^{+0.00503}_{−0.00315} | 0.15987^{+0.00580}_{−0.00607} | 3.931 | 0.03646^{+0.00072}_{−0.00074} | 568.1^{+6.1}_{−5.9} | transit | 154.09±0.11 | 0.40±0.02 | 3,568±44 | |
| TOI-2005 b | <6.4 | 1.07^{+0.06}_{−0.11} | 17.305904^{+0.000023}_{−0.000020} | 0.16±0.02 | | transit | 1,072.08^{+15.00}_{−13.70} | 1.59^{+0.016}_{−0.017} | 7,130±150 | |
| TOI-2015 c | 0.02803^{+0.001196}_{−0.001259} | | 5.582796^{+0.000042}_{−0.000041} | 0.041232±0.000004 | 448±3 | timing | 154.34±0.16 | 0.3041^{+0.0353}_{−0.0312} | 3,297^{+14}_{−28} | |
| TOI-2076 e | | 0.12089^{+0.00901}_{−0.00874} | 3.0223445±0.0000033 | 0.0385^{+0.0021}_{−0.0049} | 1138 | transit | 136.7 | 0.849^{+0.027}_{−0.026} | 5,200±100 | |
| TOI-2267 b | | 0.0892±0.0098 | 2.2890900^{+0.0000012}_{−0.0000011} | 0.0205±0.0025 | 424^{+19}_{−17} | transit | 73.5±0.6 | 0.1710±0.0079 | 3030±100 | |
| TOI-2267 c | | 0.102±0.012 | 3.4950412±0.0000022 | 0.0263^{+0.0040}_{−0.0036} | 374^{+23}_{−21} | transit | 73.5±0.6 | 0.1710±0.0079 | 3030±100 | |
| TOI-2267 d | | 0.158±0.038 | 2.0344671±0.0000023 | 0.0145^{+0.0006}_{−0.0007} | 422^{+53}_{−56} | transit | 73.5±0.6 | | | |
| TOI-2407 b | | 0.380±0.023 | 2.703 | 0.033±0.001 | 705±12 | transit | 300.06 | 0.548±0.016 | 3,530±100 | |
| TOI-2449 b | 0.7±0.04 | 1.0±0.01 | 106.1447 | 0.45±0.01 | 400 | transit | 505.5 | 1.079^{+0.045}_{−0.048} | 6,021±62 | Also known as NGTS-36 b. |
| TOI-2969 b | 1.16±0.04 | 1.1±0.08 | 1.8237146±0.0000002 | 0.0261±0.0002 | 1186 | transit | 530.0 | 0.71±0.02 | 4738±100 | |
| TOI-2989 b | 3.0±0.2 | 1.12±0.05 | 3.122832±0.000001 | 0.0384±0.0003 | 1000 | transit | 635.7 | 0.77±0.02 | 4672±170 | |
| TOI-3493 b | 0.0282^{+0.00368}_{−0.00377} | 0.287±0.00714 | 8.1594667^{+0.0000016}_{−0.0000017} | | 1,102^{+20}_{−14} | transit | 315.59±0.65 | 1.023±0.041 | 5,844±42 | |
| TOI-4507 b | <0.094 | 0.7333±0.0071 | 104.61595±0.00004 | 0.449±0.003 | | transit | 580.6 | 1.15±0.07 | 6,235±100 | |
| TOI-5108 b | 0.101±0.0157 | 0.589±0.00892 | 6.753 | 0.073±0.004 | 1,180±40 | transit | 427.6±2.0 | 1.10±0.03 | 5,808±40 | |
| TOI-5143 c | | 1.45^{+0.18}_{−0.12} | 5.2097118^{+0.0000032}_{−0.0000039} | 0.05602^{+0.00082}_{−0.00079} | | transit | 582.42±1.97 | 0.864^{+0.040}_{−0.033} | 5,183±125 | |
| TOI-5300 b | 0.6±0.1 | 0.88±0.08 | 2.262196±0.000003 | 0.0295±0.0003 | 1043 | transit | 530.6 | 0.67±0.02 | 4610±207 | |
| TOI-5573 b | 0.35±0.06 | 0.87±0.04 | 8.79759±0.00001 | 0.0712±0.0008 | 528 | transit | 606.0 | 0.619±0.023 | 3,790±59 | |
| TOI-5786 b | 0.230±0.0283 | 0.762±0.0116 | 12.779 | 0.114±0.007 | 1,040±40 | transit | 632.1±1.6 | 1.23^{+0.04}_{−0.03} | 6,235±50 | |
| TOI-5795 b | 0.0744^{+0.0129}_{−0.0145} | 0.5014±0.0098 | 6.140632±0.000005 | 0.064±0.002 | 1137 | transit | 526.7 | 0.901^{+0.055}_{−0.037} | 5,715±55 | |
| TOI-5800 b | 0.030±0.006 | 0.218±0.026 | 2.6279 | 0.0345±0.0014 | 1,108±20 | transit | 139.4±0.1 | 0.778^{+0.037}_{−0.032} | 4,850±78 | |
| TOI-5817 b | 0.03241^{+0.00441}_{−0.00409} | 0.275±0.012 | 15.61 | 0.1223±0.0060 | 950^{+21}_{−18} | transit | 262.0±0.5 | 0.970^{+0.072}_{−0.055} | 5,770±50 | |
| TOI-6038 A b | 0.247^{+0.030}_{−0.031} | 0.572^{+0.018}_{−0.014} | 5.82673 | 0.0690^{+0.0012}_{−0.0011} | 1,439^{+25}_{−24} | transit | 577.9±2.0 | 1.291^{+0.066}_{−0.060} | 6,110±100 | The host star is part of a binary system with a K-type companion. |
| TOI-6041 b | <0.0909 | 0.406^{+0.016}_{−0.015} | 26.04945^{+0.00033}_{−0.00034} | 0.1651^{+0.0026}_{−0.0022} | 605.6^{+8.4}_{−8.3} | transit | 236.417 ^{+0.681}_{−0.677} | 0.885^{+0.042}_{−0.036} | 5445^{+97}_{−96} | |
| TOI-6041 c | 0.245^{+0.029}_{−0.028} | | 88.0^{+1.6}_{−1.3} | 0.3721^{+0.0067}_{−0.0063} | 403.5±5.9 | radial vel. | 236.417 ^{+0.681}_{−0.677} | 0.885^{+0.042}_{−0.036} | 5445^{+97}_{−96} | |
| TOI-6478 b | 0.0311 | 0.411±0.021 | 34.005019±0.000025 | 0.1136±0.0060 | 204.4±4.9 | transit | 125.93±0.33 | 0.230±0.007 | 3,230±75 | |
| TOI-6695 b | 0.21±0.01 | 0.85±0.02 | 80.389^{+0.003}_{−0.005} | 0.402±0.002 | 599±8 | transit | 921.814 ^{+11.700}_{−11.415} | 1.338^{+0.023}_{−0.022} | 6400±100 | |
| TOI-6695 c | 1.45±0.03 | | 242.4^{+0.4}_{−0.3} | 0.838±0.005 | 415^{+6}_{−5} | radial vel. | 921.814 ^{+11.700}_{−11.415} | 1.338^{+0.023}_{−0.022} | 6400±100 | |
| TOI-6894 b | 0.168±0.022 | 0.855±0.022 | 3.371 | 0.02604±0.00045 | 417.9±8.6 | transit | 237.96±0.95 | 0.207±0.011 | 3007±58 | |
| TOI-7149 b | 0.705±0.075 | 1.180±0.045 | 2.652 | 0.026±0.00076 | 593±21 | transit | 415.0±2.4 | 0.344±0.030 | 3,363±59 | |
| TOI-7166 b | | 0.1793±0.0054 | 12.920636±0.000001 | 0.06191±0.00044 | 249 | transit | 114.9 | 0.19±0.004 | 3,099±51 | Located in habitable zone. |
| TOI-7510 b | 0.0571±0.0052 | 0.652±0.020 | 11.5308690 | 0.1019±0.0020 | 878±13 | transit | 812.302 ^{+8.444}_{−8.277} | 1.063±0.065 | 5720±50 | |
| TOI-7510 c | 0.412±0.036 | 0.964±0.029 | 22.5687423 | 0.1595±0.0032 | 702±10 | transit | 812.302 ^{+8.444}_{−8.277} | 1.063±0.065 | 5720±50 | |
| TOI-7510 d | 0.597±0.064 | 0.939±0.029 | 48.8644680 | 0.2672±0.0053 | 542.4±7.8 | transit | 812.302 ^{+8.444}_{−8.277} | 1.063±0.065 | 5720±50 | |
| WASP-154 b | 0.626±0.129 | 0.96±0.06 | 3.811678±0.000001 | 0.044±0.003 | 994±63 | transit | 702.87±6.40 | 0.80±0.05 | 4,774±133 | |
| WASP-188 b | 1.443^{+0.296}_{−0.298} | 1.322±0.051 | 5.748916±0.000003 | 0.072±0.003 | 1,666±70 | transit | 2,202.47±31.55 | 1.50±0.09 | 6,850±125 | |
| WASP-195 b | 0.104^{+0.03}_{−0.031} | 0.92±0.05 | 5.051928±0.000004 | 0.063±0.003 | 1,522±71 | transit | 1,581.38±16.60 | 1.30±0.08 | 6,300±125 | |
| WASP-197 b | 1.269±0.254 | 1.289±0.049 | 5.167228±0.000003 | 0.065±0.002 | 1,665±67 | transit | 1,577.54±40.08 | 1.36±0.08 | 6,050±100 | |
| WISPIT 1 b | 10.4^{+0.7}_{−0.8} | | | 338 | | imaging | 747±2 | | 4670^{+990}_{−540} (Note: Temperature of component A) | Circumbinary planets. |
| WISPIT 1 c | 5.3^{+0.8}_{−0.6} | | | 840 | | imaging | 747±2 | | 4670^{+990}_{−540} | |
| WISPIT 2 b | 5.3±1.0 | 1.6±0.2 | | 15.0 | | imaging | 435 | 1.08^{+0.06}_{−0.17} | 4,400±50 | |
| Proxima Cen d | 0.000818±0.000120 | | 5.12338±0.00035 | 0.02881±0.00017 | 282±23 | radial vel. | 4.2465±0.0003 | 0.1221±0.0022 | 2900±100 | |
| 55 Cnc B b | 0.011±0.003 | | 6.7994^{+0.0013}_{−0.0014} | 0.0440±0.0012 | | radial vel. | 40.95±0.02 | 0.26±0.02 | 3286±31 | |
| 55 Cnc B c | 0.017±0.004 | | 33.747±0.035 | 0.130±0.003 | | radial vel. | 40.95±0.02 | 0.26±0.02 | 3286±31 | |
| AU Mic e | 0.0664^{+0.0170}_{−0.0135} | | 33.11±0.06 | | | radial vel. | 31.683±0.007 | 0.60±0.04 | 3665±31 | |
| GJ 251 b | 0.0122±0.0025 | | 53.647±0.044 | 0.196±0.014 | 216.0±0.8 | radial vel. | 18.215±0.003 | 0.35^{+0.05}_{−0.04} | 3342±24 | |
| GJ 341 b | <0.013 | 0.079±0.004 | 7.576860^{+0.000034}_{−0.000020} | | | transit | 34.095±0.010 | 0.48±0.03 | 3770±40 | |
| GJ 508.2 b | >1.85 | | >5300 | >4.85 | | radial vel. | 54.268±0.038 | 0.54±0.12 | 3720±12 | |
| GJ 9773 b | 0.543±0.016 | | 2965^{+41}_{−37} | 2.921±0.045 | | radial vel. | 51.933±0.082 | 0.358±0.011 | 3528±25 | |
| Gaia-4 b | 11.80^{+0.73}_{−0.66} | | 571.3^{+1.4}_{−1.3} | | | astrometry | 239.683 ^{+0.501}_{−0.499} | 0.644^{+0.025}_{−0.023} | 4034±77 | |
| Gl 725 A b | 0.00875±0.00110 | | 11.2201±0.0051 | 0.068±0.001 | | radial vel. | 11.4908±0.0009 | 0.330±0.008 | 3433±68 | |
| HD 101581 b | | 0.0883±0.0062 | 6.20401^{+0.00054}_{−0.00044} | 0.0573±0.0009 | 747^{+21}_{−20} | transit | 41.694±0.010 | 0.653±0.028 | 4675±53 | |
| HD 101581 c | | 0.08529^{+0.00544}_{−0.00562} | 4.46569^{+0.00029}_{−0.00032} | 0.0460±0.0007 | 834±23 | transit | 41.694±0.010 | 0.653±0.028 | 4675±53 | |
| HD 20794 f | 0.0183±0.0018 | | 647.6^{+2.5}_{−2.7} | 1.3541±0.0068 | | radial vel. | 19.58±0.03 | 0.79±0.01 | 5368±64 | |
| HD 23079 c | 0.0260±0.0025 | | 5.748913±0.000204 | | | radial vel. | 109.22±0.07 | 1.16^{+0.02}_{−0.03} | 5994^{+55}_{−64} | |
| HD 28471 b | 0.0117^{+0.0013}_{−0.0014} | | 3.1649^{+0.0002}_{−0.0003} | 0.042±0.001 | 1377 | radial vel. | 142.353 ^{+0.203}_{−0.202} | 0.9800±0.0440 | 5766±101 | |
| HD 28471 c | 0.0180^{+0.0018}_{−0.0023} | | 6.1245^{+0.0856}_{−0.0009} | 0.065±0.001 | 1066 | radial vel. | 142.353 ^{+0.203}_{−0.202} | 0.9800±0.0440 | 5766±101 | |
| HD 28471 d | 0.0154^{+0.0026}_{−0.0024} | | 11.6810^{+0.0042}_{−0.0055} | 0.100±0.002 | 945 | radial vel. | 142.353 ^{+0.203}_{−0.202} | 0.9800±0.0440 | 5766±101 | |
| HD 35843 b | 0.0184±0.0026 | | 9.8991^{+0.0557}_{−0.0574} | 0.088±0.002 | | radial vel. | 227.005 ^{+0.416}_{−0.414} | 0.94±0.06 | 5666±61 | |
| HD 35843 c | 0.03562^{+0.00497}_{−0.00466} | 0.227^{+0.007}_{−0.006} | 46.9622±0.0002 | 0.25±0.01 | 479±12 | transit | 227.005 ^{+0.416}_{−0.414} | 0.94±0.06 | 5666±61 | |
| HD 73344 c | 0.373^{+0.022}_{−0.021} | | 65.94±0.02 | 0.3388^{+0.0042}_{−0.0043} | | radial vel. | 114.94±0.09 | 1.19±0.05 | 6148±100 | |
| HD 73344 d | 2.21^{+0.34}_{−0.35} | 2.55^{+0.56}_{−0.46} | 5823^{+312}_{−308} | 6.70^{+0.25}_{−0.26} | | radial vel. | 114.94±0.09 | 1.19±0.05 | 6148±100 | |
| HD 86728 b | 0.0297±0.0018 | | 31.1515^{+0.0059}_{−0.0066} | 0.19160^{+0.00066}_{−0.00065} | | radial vel. | 48.671 ^{+0.157}_{−0.156} | 0.967±0.010 | 5610±46 | |
| HIP 111909 b | 1.21±0.10 | | 487.08^{+3.81}_{−3.63} | 1.32^{+0.04}_{−0.05} | | radial vel. | 287.303 ^{+1.654}_{−1.635} | 1.28±0.11 | 4891±50 | |
| HIP 111909 c | 0.81±0.08 | | 893.63^{+14.89}_{−16.03} | 1.97^{+0.08}_{−0.03} | | radial vel. | 287.303 ^{+1.654}_{−1.635} | 1.28±0.11 | 4891±50 | |
| HIP 18606 b | 0.77±0.07 | | 674.94^{+6.43}_{−6.28} | 1.61±0.05 | | radial vel. | 153.393±0.657 | 1.21^{+0.11}_{−0.10} | 4860±50 | |
| HIP 41378 g | 0.0205^{+0.0042}_{−0.0013} | 0.2235^{+0.0051}_{−0.0050} | 31.708380^{+0.000390}_{−0.000410} | 0.2093±0.0022 | 765.87±8.33 | radial vel. | 345.7±0.8 | 1.245^{+0.037}_{−0.043} | 6371±65 | |
| K2-73 c | 3.5931^{+0.1668}_{−0.1416} | | 1000.00±100.00 | | 186.1^{+6.6}_{−7.2} | radial vel. | 878.137 ^{+8.280}_{−8.131} | 1.02±0.04 | 5867±100 | |
| KMT-2023-BLG-0548L b | 3.42^{+1.21}_{−0.89} | | 6.85^{+1.22}_{−1.10} | | | microlensing | 22668 ^{+3979}_{−3588} | 0.72^{+0.26}_{−0.19} | | |
| KMT-2023-BLG-0830L b | 0.056^{+0.064}_{−0.033} | | 1.70^{+0.27}_{−0.29} | | | microlensing | 23385 ^{+3686}_{−3946} | 0.22^{+0.26}_{−0.13} | | |
| KMT-2023-BLG-0949L b | 5.980^{+4.360}_{−3.110} | | 2.03^{+0.66}_{−0.81} | | | microlensing | 17254 ^{+5350}_{−7860} | 0.48^{+0.35}_{−0.25} | | |
| KMT-2024-BLG-1281L b | 0.0600^{+0.0660}_{−0.0360} | | 1.96^{+0.30}_{−0.38} | | | microlensing | 22407 ^{+3555}_{−4566} | 0.32^{+0.35}_{−0.19} | | |
| KMT-2024-BLG-2059L b | 0.022^{+0.012}_{−0.013} | | 2.55^{+0.56}_{−0.89} | | | microlensing | 17221 ^{+4305}_{−6882} | 0.51^{+0.28}_{−0.30} | | |
| KMT-2024-BLG-2242L b | 0.044^{+0.076}_{−0.024} | | 0.890±0.120 | | | microlensing | 24788 ^{+3294}_{−3359} | 0.069^{+0.120}_{−0.038} | | |
| NGTS-31 b | 1.12±0.12 | 1.61±0.16 | 4.162734±0.000004 | 0.064±0.008 | 1410±20 | transit | 1622.247 | 0.960^{+0.110}_{−0.050} | 5710±70 | |
| NGTS-32 b | 0.57±0.05 | 1.42±0.03 | 3.31211±0.00002 | 0.044±0.001 | 1750±20 | transit | 2733.399 ^{+53.079}_{−51.121} | 1.07^{+0.06}_{−0.04} | 5680±60 | |
| NGTS-34 b | 0.0601^{+0.0154}_{−0.0142} | 0.326±0.020 | 43.12655^{+0.00012}_{−0.00017} | 0.257±0.018 | 624^{+19}_{−16} | transit | 392.971 ^{+1.412}_{−1.402} | 1.266^{+0.063}_{−0.081} | 6134^{+55}_{−50} | |
| NGTS-35 b | 0.478^{+0.069}_{−0.060} | 0.9724±0.0580 | 25.241192±0.000022 | 0.160±0.011 | 451^{+11}_{−10} | transit | 597.193 ^{+4.204}_{−4.149} | 0.789^{+0.035}_{−0.048} | 4717^{+18}_{−84} | |
| OGLE-2015-BLG-1609L b | 0.240^{+0.900}_{−0.170} | | | | | microlensing | 12394 ^{+8480}_{−6849} | 0.17^{+0.63}_{−0.12} | | |
| TIC 434398831 b | | 0.313^{+0.020}_{−0.019} | 3.685504^{+0.000012}_{−0.000011} | 0.04641±0.00017 | 1250±11 | transit | 707.986 ^{+7.143}_{−7.000} | 0.992^{+0.014}_{−0.018} | 5638±50 | |
| TIC 434398831 c | | 0.502^{+0.026}_{−0.025} | 6.210291^{+0.000013}_{−0.000020} | 0.06572±0.00024 | 1050±10 | transit | 707.986 ^{+7.143}_{−7.000} | 0.992^{+0.014}_{−0.018} | 5638±50 | |
| TOI-1011 b | 0.0127±0.0019 | 0.129±0.004 | 2.470498±0.000007 | | | transit | 171.601 ^{+0.259}_{−0.258} | 0.91±0.03 | 5475±84 | |
| TOI-1266 d | 0.0116^{+0.0033}_{−0.0035} | | 32.509^{+0.062}_{−0.049} | 0.1513±0.0024 | 288±5 | transit | 117.462 ± 0.096 | 0.437±0.021 | 3563±77 | |
| TOI-1346 b | | 0.213±0.014 | 1.7622538^{+0.0000047}_{−0.0000046} | | 1324 | transit | 376.554 ^{+1.053}_{−1.047} | 0.82±0.10 | 5099±50 | |
| TOI-1346 c | | 0.199±0.012 | 5.502558±0.000015 | | 928 | transit | 376.554 ^{+1.053}_{−1.047} | 0.82±0.10 | 5099±50 | |
| TOI-1422 c | 0.044±0.009 | 0.233±0.012 | 34.5633±0.0002 | 0.205±0.005 | 628±10 | radial vel. | 506.031 ^{+2.162}_{−2.143} | 0.99030^{+0.03580}_{−0.03550} | 5811^{+82}_{−81} | |
| TOI-1438 b | 0.0296±0.0057 | 0.271±0.017 | 5.139670±0.000003 | 0.0553±0.0015 | 971±11 | transit | 360.465 ^{+0.819}_{−0.812} | 0.876±0.038 | 5230±60 | |
| TOI-1438 c | 0.0334±0.0066 | 0.245±0.012 | 9.428089±0.000001 | 0.083±0.003 | 794±9 | transit | 360.465 ^{+0.819}_{−0.812} | 0.876±0.038 | 5230±60 | |
| TOI-1472 c | 0.067±0.003 | 0.298±0.007 | 15.5381747±0.0000031 | 0.116±0.003 | 662±13 | radial vel. | 397.488 ^{+4.341}_{−4.250} | 0.87±0.06 | 5100±50 | |
| TOI-1648 b | 0.0233^{+0.0035}_{−0.0040} | 0.227^{+0.013}_{−0.011} | 7.331602^{+0.000015}_{−0.000020} | 0.0694^{+0.0016}_{−0.0017} | 799±16 | transit | 227.765 ^{+0.537}_{−0.535} | 0.83±0.06 | 4850±50 | |
| TOI-1743 b | | 0.163^{+0.010}_{−0.009} | 4.266046±0.000002 | 0.03589^{+0.00092}_{−0.00110} | 799±16 | transit | 134.624 ± 0.289 | 0.339^{+0.027}_{−0.031} | 3277^{+78}_{−77} | |
| TOI-1803 b | 0.03247^{+0.00522}_{−0.00151} | 0.267±0.007 | 6.293287±0.000028 | 0.060±0.001 | 747±11 | transit | 388.962 ^{+3.102}_{−3.053} | 0.756^{+0.050}_{−0.042} | 4687±65 | |
| TOI-1803 c | 0.03^{+0.00}_{−0.01} | 0.383±0.007 | 12.885779±0.000036 | 0.097±0.002 | 588±10 | transit | 388.962 ^{+3.102}_{−3.053} | 0.756^{+0.050}_{−0.042} | 4687±65 | |
| TOI-2031 A b | 1.267±0.024 | 0.800±0.230 | 5.71548654^{+0.00000076}_{−0.00000075} | 0.0660^{+0.0011}_{−0.0012} | 1358^{+36}_{−28} | transit | 900.588 ^{+5.023}_{−4.967} | 1.174^{+0.060}_{−0.062} | 6490^{+170}_{−130} | |
| TOI-2093 b | 0.0334±0.0079 | | 12.836±0.021 | 0.097±0.002 | 535±17 | radial vel. | 270.057 ^{+0.518}_{−0.516} | 0.745±0.034 | 4426±85 | |
| TOI-2093 c | 0.0497^{+0.0113}_{−0.0120} | 0.205±0.011 | 53.81149±0.00017 | 0.257^{+0.017}_{−0.018} | 329^{+13}_{−11} | transit | 270.057 ^{+0.518}_{−0.516} | 0.745±0.034 | 4426±85 | |
| TOI-2141 c | 0.0193±0.0027 | | 5.4624^{+0.0026}_{−0.0027} | 0.0585^{+0.0011}_{−0.0012} | 1095±17 | radial vel. | 253.371 ^{+0.736}_{−0.732} | 0.896^{+0.059}_{−0.051} | 5635±61 | |
| TOI-2141 d | 0.0469±0.0066 | | 60.45^{+0.24}_{−0.25} | 0.2906^{+0.0055}_{−0.0057} | 491.4^{+7.4}_{−7.2} | radial vel. | 253.371 ^{+0.736}_{−0.732} | 0.896^{+0.059}_{−0.051} | 5635±61 | |
| TOI-2169 A b | 1.037^{+0.077}_{−0.076} | 1.116^{+0.037}_{−0.036} | 8.2148282^{+0.0000081}_{−0.0000080} | 0.0896^{+0.0014}_{−0.0015} | 1364±21 | transit | 1146.629 ^{+11.631}_{−11.406} | 1.420^{+0.069}_{−0.070} | 6270±130 | |
| TOI-2322 b | 0.00727^{+0.00840}_{−0.00485} | 0.08868^{+0.00509}_{−0.00526} | 11.307170^{+0.000085}_{−0.000079} | 0.09240^{+0.0061}_{−0.0097} | 603.1^{+33.6}_{−23.2} | transit | 195.252 ^{+0.260}_{−0.259} | 0.703^{+0.014}_{−0.017} | 4664±14 | |
| TOI-2322 c | 0.05695^{+0.01366}_{−0.01686} | 0.1672^{+0.0059}_{−0.0051} | 20.225528^{+0.000039}_{−0.000044} | 0.1362^{+0.0090}_{−0.0143} | 496.8^{+27.7}_{−19.1} | transit | 195.252 ^{+0.260}_{−0.259} | 0.703^{+0.014}_{−0.017} | 4664±14 | |
| TOI-2328 b | 0.16±0.02 | 0.89^{+0.03}_{−0.04} | 17.10197±0.00001 | 0.127^{+0.006}_{−0.007} | 842^{+20}_{−21} | transit | 756.000 ^{+3.617}_{−3.581} | 0.95±0.06 | 5525^{+147}_{−144} | |
| TOI-2345 b | 0.0110±0.0027 | 0.1342^{+0.0042}_{−0.0039} | 1.0528573^{+0.0000025}_{−0.0000026} | 0.01705^{+0.00022}_{−0.00023} | 1478±20 | transit | 266.319 ^{+0.540}_{−0.538} | 0.727±0.033 | 4687±60 | |
| TOI-2345 c | 0.0229^{+0.0071}_{−0.0077} | 0.2187^{+0.0040}_{−0.0041} | 21.064302±0.000041 | 0.1257^{+0.0016}_{−0.0017} | 544±7 | transit | 266.319 ^{+0.540}_{−0.538} | 0.727±0.033 | 4687±60 | |
| TOI-2346 b | 1.24±0.22 | 1.438^{+0.043}_{−0.041} | 3.3312029±0.0000024 | 0.04730^{+0.00086}_{−0.00094} | 1689^{+47}_{−42} | transit | 1427.418 ^{+20.039}_{−19.501} | 1.271^{+0.070}_{−0.074} | 6480^{+200}_{−180} | |
| TOI-2719 b | | 0.534±0.041 | 3.37594±0.00005 | | 1710 | transit | 1920.588 ^{+41.507}_{−39.817} | 1.02±0.13 | 5762±50 | |
| TOI-2382 b | 0.74±0.25 | 1.093^{+0.076}_{−0.051} | 4.6612061±0.0000032 | 0.0590±0.0010 | 1426^{+15}_{−14} | transit | 1422.215 ^{+53.336}_{−49.667} | 1.260^{+0.064}_{−0.065} | 6033^{+81}_{−83} | |
| TOI-283 b | 0.0206±0.0064 | 0.209±0.008 | 17.61745^{+0.00002}_{−0.00001} | 0.123±0.004 | 661±9 | transit | 269.740 ^{+0.690}_{−0.687} | 0.80±0.01 | 5213±70 | |
| TOI-2876 b | 0.170±0.052 | 0.860^{+0.030}_{−0.028} | 6.2996431±0.0000070 | 0.0654^{+0.0009}_{−0.0011} | 929^{+17}_{−15} | transit | 736.359 ^{+4.961}_{−4.892} | 0.939^{+0.041}_{−0.045} | 5271^{+110}_{−96} | |
| TOI-2886 b | 1.40±0.23 | 1.663^{+0.041}_{−0.035} | 1.60200105^{+0.00000044}_{−0.00000043} | 0.02871^{+0.00044}_{−0.00051} | 1978^{+45}_{−46} | transit | 1349.957 ^{+22.218}_{−21.526} | 1.229^{+0.057}_{−0.065} | 6240±150 | |
| TOI-2986 b | 0.304^{+0.067}_{−0.086} | 0.829^{+0.023}_{−0.021} | 3.2783662^{+0.0000044}_{−0.0000043} | 0.04489^{+0.00096}_{−0.00088} | 1622±18 | transit | 1843.681 ^{+84.080}_{−77.152} | 1.122^{+0.074}_{−0.064} | 5906^{+66}_{−69} | |
| TOI-2992 b | 3.33±0.39 | 1.227±0.045 | 3.0078120±0.0000019 | 0.0434^{+0.0009}_{−0.0013} | 1726^{+25}_{−24} | transit | 1769.859 ^{+43.268}_{−41.285} | 1.21^{+0.07}_{−0.10} | 6000^{+100}_{−110} | |
| TOI-3135 b | 1.03^{+0.30}_{−0.27} | 1.218±0.030 | 3.7065585±0.0000013 | 0.04756^{+0.00063}_{−0.00073} | 1292^{+31}_{−30} | transit | 723.077 ^{+4.498}_{−4.439} | 1.044^{+0.042}_{−0.047} | 5890^{+150}_{−140} | |
| TOI-3160 A b | 1.19^{+0.16}_{−0.15} | 1.228^{+0.046}_{−0.045} | 3.9712810±0.0000025 | 0.0505±0.0012 | 1539^{+39}_{−40} | transit | 1865.013 ^{+119.607}_{−106.127} | 1.088^{+0.082}_{−0.078} | 6190±170 | |
| TOI-3288 b | 2.11±0.08 | 1.00±0.03 | 1.4338635±0.0000004 | 0.0215±0.0001 | 1059±21 | transit | 653.943±5.057 | 0.64±0.01 | 3933±48 | |
| TOI-3464 b | 1.228^{+0.057}_{−0.053} | 1.25^{+0.27}_{−0.26} | 3.6515568^{+0.0000060}_{−0.0000061} | 0.0515^{+0.0012}_{−0.0013} | 1693^{+54}_{−45} | transit | 1951.654 ^{+44.687}_{−42.762} | 1.363^{+0.095}_{−0.099} | 6370^{+290}_{−250} | |
| TOI-3474 b | 0.61^{+0.14}_{−0.15} | 1.309^{+0.033}_{−0.032} | 3.8795105±0.0000045 | 0.0502±0.0010 | 1451^{+38}_{−36} | transit | 1371.064 ^{+24.080}_{−23.275} | 1.121^{+0.069}_{−0.067} | 6020^{+170}_{−160} | |
| TOI-3486 b | 0.312^{+0.057}_{−0.056} | 0.943^{+0.030}_{−0.029} | 2.21778105±0.00000088 | 0.03138^{+0.00046}_{−0.00043} | 1190^{+28}_{−24} | transit | 504.655 ^{+2.939}_{−2.903} | 0.837^{+0.037}_{−0.034} | 4930^{+120}_{−110} | |
| TOI-3523 A b | 1.37^{+0.12}_{−0.11} | 1.425^{+0.037}_{−0.035} | 2.30458952±0.00000082 | 0.03559^{+0.00076}_{−0.00084} | 1984±33 | transit | 2110.477 ^{+81.728}_{−75.933} | 1.131^{+0.074}_{−0.078} | 6450±110 | |
| TOI-3593 b | 1.78^{+0.09}_{−0.13} | 0.9840^{+0.0280}_{−0.0260} | 3.8212867±0.0000016 | 0.04810^{+0.00058}_{−0.00070} | 1170^{+19}_{−22} | transit | 739.235 ^{+5.554}_{−5.470} | 1.015^{+0.037}_{−0.043} | 5550^{+100}_{−120} | |
| TOI-3682 b | 0.218^{+0.075}_{−0.080} | 1.142^{+0.036}_{−0.035} | 3.3462406±0.0000023 | 0.0480^{+0.0006}_{−0.0015} | 1657^{+25}_{−24} | transit | 1319.343 ^{+25.933}_{−24.965} | 1.32^{+0.05}_{−0.12} | 5703^{+100}_{−98} | |
| TOI-3837 b | 0.59±0.05 | 0.970^{+0.050}_{−0.060} | 11.88865±0.00003 | 0.099^{+0.006}_{−0.005} | 1178^{+29}_{−31} | transit | 1017.035 ^{+14.361}_{−13.973} | 0.89±0.05 | 5905^{+157}_{−155} | |
| TOI-3856 b | 0.54±0.10 | 1.213^{+0.025}_{−0.024} | 2.04360352±0.00000094 | 0.03250^{+0.00044}_{−0.00049} | 1544^{+14}_{−13} | transit | 1026.046 ^{+15.278}_{−14.840} | 1.096^{+0.045}_{−0.049} | 5622±50 | |
| TOI-3877 b | 0.314^{+0.069}_{−0.067} | 1.042^{+0.044}_{−0.043} | 4.1235960±0.0000067 | 0.0529^{+0.0010}_{−0.0014} | 1445^{+19}_{−17} | transit | 1612.677 ^{+43.496}_{−41.304} | 1.160^{+0.066}_{−0.089} | 5731^{+82}_{−81} | |
| TOI-3980 b | 0.59^{+0.19}_{−0.17} | 1.29^{+0.20}_{−0.10} | 3.6089254^{+0.0000030}_{−0.0000031} | 0.0494^{+0.0010}_{−0.0018} | 1621^{+29}_{−28} | transit | 1588.177 ^{+26.435}_{−25.597} | 1.24^{+0.08}_{−0.13} | 5840±140 | |
| TOI-4155 b | | 0.286±0.015 | 3.320729±0.000058 | | 1255 | transit | 785.195 ^{+4.155}_{−4.113} | 1.16±0.22 | 5724±50 | |
| TOI-4214 b | 0.520^{+0.053}_{−0.054} | 0.953^{+0.032}_{−0.030} | 3.4913885^{+0.0000033}_{−0.0000032} | 0.05018^{+0.00077}_{−0.00094} | 1642^{+47}_{−40} | transit | 1131.843 ^{+16.595}_{−16.132} | 1.382^{+0.064}_{−0.076} | 6370^{+220}_{−210} | |
| TOI-4364 b | | 0.179^{+0.009}_{−0.007} | 5.424019^{+0.000010}_{−0.000011} | 0.04753^{+0.00053}_{−0.00054} | 488^{+9}_{−7} | transit | 143.401±0.341 | 0.487^{+0.017}_{−0.016} | 3528^{+33}_{−20} | |
| TOI-4465 b | 5.89±0.26 | 1.25^{+0.08}_{−0.07} | 101.94054^{+0.00040}_{−0.00036} | 0.416±0.014 | 427±65 | transit | 395.134 ^{+1.999}_{−1.983} | 0.93±0.06 | 5545±19 | |
| TOI-4487 A b | 1.25±0.16 | 1.303^{+0.069}_{−0.064} | 3.9540709±0.0000021 | 0.05448^{+0.00085}_{−0.00086} | 1639^{+17}_{−16} | transit | 1563.478 ^{+20.239}_{−19.737} | 1.378^{+0.065}_{−0.064} | 6206^{+90}_{−88} | |
| TOI-4666 b | 0.70±0.06 | 1.11±0.04 | 2.9089168^{+0.0000007}_{−0.0000006} | 0.0333±0.0002 | 713±14 | transit | 504.750 ^{+1.784}_{−1.768} | 0.58±0.01 | 3512±36 | |
| TOI-4734 b | 0.194^{+0.033}_{−0.032} | 0.974^{+0.025}_{−0.023} | 6.235633^{+0.000010}_{−0.000011} | 0.0740^{+0.0013}_{−0.0018} | 1468^{+36}_{−33} | transit | 1840.674 ^{+64.546}_{−60.378} | 1.391^{+0.074}_{−0.097} | 6070^{+160}_{−150} | |
| TOI-4773 b | 5.31^{+0.35}_{−0.34} | 1.358^{+0.049}_{−0.048} | 1.7452851±0.0000014 | 0.03216^{+0.00060}_{−0.00056} | 2255^{+73}_{−59} | transit | 1608.388 ^{+25.597}_{−24.822} | 1.452^{+0.082}_{−0.075} | 6740^{+250}_{−200} | |
| TOI-4794 b | 0.970^{+0.240}_{−0.230} | 1.281^{+0.044}_{−0.039} | 3.5658116±0.0000063 | 0.0492^{+0.0009}_{−0.0010} | 1673^{+35}_{−33} | transit | 1772.402 ^{+35.231}_{−33.907} | 1.250^{+0.068}_{−0.075} | 6390^{+160}_{−150} | |
| TOI-4940 b | | 0.590±0.033 | 25.867811^{+0.000058}_{−0.000056} | 0.165±0.012 | 643^{+21}_{−18} | transit | 1127.641 ^{+11.924}_{−11.683} | 1.012^{+0.040}_{−0.047} | 5504^{+43}_{−55} | |
| TOI-4961 b | 1.80^{+0.21}_{−0.23} | 1.101^{+0.041}_{−0.039} | 7.4791820±0.0000082 | 0.0726^{+0.0013}_{−0.0011} | 919^{+30}_{−29} | transit | 695.008 ^{+4.472}_{−4.416} | 0.912^{+0.051}_{−0.040} | 5380^{+180}_{−170} | |
| TOI-5181 A b | 1.04±0.17 | 1.191^{+0.040}_{−0.038} | 3.8922295±0.0000023 | 0.0522^{+0.0008}_{−0.0010} | 1585^{+25}_{−32} | transit | 1566.804 ^{+22.087}_{−21.491} | 1.250^{+0.060}_{−0.072} | 6060^{+120}_{−140} | |
| TOI-521 b | 0.017±0.003 | 0.177±0.012 | 1.54285047^{+0.00000100}_{−0.00000080} | 0.0195±0.0003 | 794±35 | transit | 198.774 ^{+0.733}_{−0.727} | 0.42±0.03 | 3544±100 | |
| TOI-5210 b | 0.258±0.041 | 0.957^{+0.032}_{−0.024} | 4.5661061^{+0.0000024}_{−0.0000023} | 0.0557^{+0.0010}_{−0.0012} | 1286^{+19}_{−21} | transit | 985.435 ^{+8.827}_{−8.670} | 1.105^{+0.063}_{−0.068} | 5723^{+95}_{−120} | |
| TOI-5261 b | 11.49^{+0.43}_{−0.46} | 1.035^{+0.042}_{−0.041} | 4.1509768±0.0000068 | 0.05134^{+0.00086}_{−0.00096} | 1244^{+30}_{−25} | transit | 1230.784 ^{+25.453}_{−24.455} | 1.037^{+0.053}_{−0.057} | 5790^{+140}_{−120} | |
| TOI-5322 b | 0.579±0.081 | 1.482^{+0.031}_{−0.027} | 5.4233207^{+0.0000039}_{−0.0000038} | 0.0604^{+0.0010}_{−0.0009} | 1350^{+21}_{−19} | transit | 1557.242 ^{+38.662}_{−36.861} | 0.998^{+0.051}_{−0.046} | 5692^{+87}_{−83} | |
| TOI-5340 b | 0.85±0.25 | 1.345^{+0.051}_{−0.049} | 4.9394392^{+0.0000071}_{−0.0000072} | 0.0628^{+0.0011}_{−0.0024} | 1566^{+26}_{−29} | transit | 1738.739 ^{+37.658}_{−36.123} | 1.35^{+0.07}_{−0.15} | 5990^{+130}_{−150} | |
| TOI-5350 b | 6.59^{+0.25}_{−0.26} | 1.108^{+0.038}_{−0.029} | 7.581367^{+0.000012}_{−0.000011} | 0.0796^{+0.0014}_{−0.0015} | 1195^{+21}_{−19} | transit | 905.218 ^{+13.421}_{−13.044} | 1.167^{+0.063}_{−0.066} | 6220^{+130}_{−120} | |
| TOI-5386 A b | 0.488^{+0.048}_{−0.046} | 1.108^{+0.038}_{−0.029} | 3.62156552±0.00000083 | 0.04856^{+0.00075}_{−0.00077} | 1488±16 | transit | 1287.169 ^{+18.842}_{−18.321} | 1.165±0.055 | 6094^{+67}_{−65} | |
| TOI-5489 b | | 0.125±0.004 | 3.15222±0.00001 | | 624 | transit | 147.064±0.412 | 0.41±0.02 | 3547±157 | |
| TOI-5489 c | | 0.114±0.006 | 4.92126±0.00001 | | 536 | transit | 147.064±0.412 | 0.41±0.02 | 3547±157 | |
| TOI-5592 b | 0.899^{+0.070}_{−0.069} | 1.53^{+0.32}_{−0.16} | 2.6085846±0.0000018 | 0.03935^{+0.00074}_{−0.00082} | 1789^{+25}_{−23} | transit | 1948.109 ^{+29.713}_{−28.849} | 1.194^{+0.069}_{−0.073} | 6237^{+100}_{−96} | |
| TOI-5716 b | | 0.0856±0.0045 | 6.76630±0.00001 | | 400 | transit | 128.544 ^{+0.221}_{−0.220} | 0.19±0.01 | 3436±79 | |
| TOI-5728 b | | 0.117±0.004 | 11.49761±0.00003 | | 382 | transit | 178.411 ^{+0.338}_{−0.337} | 0.36±0.02 | 3419±70 | |
| TOI-5736 b | | 0.139±0.006 | 0.64899±0.00001 | | 1311 | transit | 301.240±0.57 | 0.57±0.02 | 3949±157 | |
| TOI-5799 c | | 0.1546^{+0.0086}_{−0.0080} | 4.164507^{+0.000005}_{−0.000006} | 0.0348^{+0.0010}_{−0.0011} | 505±16 | transit | 90.718±0.082 | 0.325±0.030 | 3452±96 | |
| TOI-6000 b | | 0.084±0.004 | 0.448959±0.000011 | | 1120 | transit | 247.114 ^{+0.617}_{−0.614} | 0.37±0.02 | 3419±157 | |
| TOI-6109 b | | 0.43451^{+0.01447}_{−0.01098} | 5.690476±0.000004 | 0.0599^{+0.0007}_{−0.0004} | | transit | 494.956 ^{+3.565}_{−3.516} | 1.03±0.05 | 5660±50 | |
| TOI-6109 c | | 0.43114^{+0.00657}_{−0.00564} | 8.538878^{+0.000006}_{−0.000005} | 0.0786^{+0.0005}_{−0.0003} | | transit | 494.956 ^{+3.565}_{−3.516} | 1.03±0.05 | 5660±50 | |
| TOI-6223 b | | 0.452±0.020 | 3.855219±0.000004 | 0.04018^{+0.00061}_{−0.00062} | 714±14 | transit | 434.224±1.745 | 0.582±0.027 | 3895±44 | |
| TOI-6303 b | 7.84±0.31 | 1.034^{+0.054}_{−0.057} | 9.4852360±0.0000162 | 0.07610±0.00100 | 541±14 | transit | 496.446±3.880 | 0.644±0.024 | 3977±59 | |
| TOI-6324 b | 0.00368±0.00069 | 0.09448±0.00366 | 0.2792210±0.0000001 | | 1216±60 | transit | 67.024 ^{+0.050}_{−0.049} | 0.269±0.012 | 3247±70 | |
| TOI-6330 b | 10.00±0.32 | 0.9720^{+0.0330}_{−0.0310} | 6.8500246±0.0000033 | 0.05763^{+0.00073}_{−0.00077} | 495±14 | transit | 453.552 ^{+3.741}_{−3.679} | 0.531±0.021 | 3539±59 | |
| TOI-6420 b | 8.20^{+0.36}_{−0.40} | 1.065^{+0.065}_{−0.059} | 6.961508±0.000012 | 0.0753^{+0.0014}_{−0.0017} | 1213^{+20}_{−21} | transit | 2072.578 ^{+49.250}_{−47.045} | 1.165^{+0.069}_{−0.078} | 6020^{+140}_{−150} | |
| TOI-6448 b | | 0.756±0.068 | 14.844261^{+0.000027}_{−0.000028} | 0.131±0.014 | 745^{+28}_{−31} | transit | 1262.154 ^{+13.542}_{−13.262} | 1.03±0.05 | 5910±90 | |
| TOI-6628 b | 0.74±0.06 | 0.980±0.060 | 18.18424±0.00001 | 0.134^{+0.007}_{−0.008} | 833^{+21}_{−23} | transit | 1046.151 ^{+19.542}_{−18.851} | 0.97±0.06 | 5463^{+143}_{−142} | |
| TOI-7041 b | 0.36±0.16 | 1.02±0.03 | 9.691±0.006 | | | transit | 1433.977 ^{+18.937}_{−18.457} | 1.07±0.05 | 4700±100 | |
| TOI-756 b | 0.03093^{+0.00566}_{−0.00503} | 0.251±0.009 | 1.2392495±0.0000007 | 0.0180±0.0002 | 934^{+23}_{−24} | transit | 281.076 ^{+1.026}_{−1.020} | 0.505±0.019 | 3657±72 | |
| TOI-756 c | 4.05±0.11 | | 149.40±0.16 | 0.439±0.005 | 194±5 | radial vel. | 281.076 ^{+1.026}_{−1.020} | 0.505±0.019 | 3657±72 | |
| TOI-880 c | | 0.442±0.018 | 6.3872703^{+0.0000069}_{−0.0000073} | 0.0635±0.0036 | 805^{+25}_{−23} | transit | 197.874 ^{+0.366}_{−0.365} | 0.87±0.03 | 5050±100 | |
| TOI-912 b | 0.016±0.002 | 0.172±0.012 | 4.6780691±0.0000017 | 0.041±0.001 | 551±27 | transit | 85.15±0.05 | 0.418±0.030 | 3572±100 | |
| TWA 7 b | | 0.34±0.06 | | 52 | 316^{+19}_{−23} | imaging | 111.2±0.1 | 0.46 | | |
| WASP-102 b | 0.622±0.133 | 1.33±0.05 | 2.7098130±0.0000003 | 0.041±0.001 | 1671±65 | transit | 1750.081 ^{+52.407}_{−49.487} | 1.08±0.07 | 5990±100 | |
| WASP-116 b | 0.64±0.14 | 1.22±0.06 | 6.613200±0.000002 | 0.065±0.003 | 1414±70 | transit | 1826.822 ^{+52.537}_{−49.726} | 1.25±0.08 | 6250±125 | |
| WASP-149 b | 0.991±0.196 | 1.36±0.06 | 1.3328130^{+0.0000006}_{−0.0000005} | 0.024±0.001 | 1855±93 | transit | 690.656 ^{+5.548}_{−5.463} | 1.05±0.06 | 5750±125 | |
| WASP-155 b | 0.871±0.180 | 1.20±0.06 | 3.110413±0.000001 | 0.043±0.002 | 1468±76 | transit | 1303.829 ^{+16.121}_{−15.736} | 1.09±0.07 | 5660±100 | |
| WASP-194 b | 1.174±0.265 | 1.381±0.088 | 3.1833870^{+0.0000004}_{−0.0000005} | 0.047±0.003 | 1693±122 | transit | 1555.417 ^{+12.687}_{−12.489} | 1.29±0.08 | 6405±200 | |
| TOI-2427 c | 0.0203±0.0025 | | 5.150±0.011 | 0.05±0.01 | | radial vel. | 93.005 ± 0.091 | 0.639^{+0.021}_{−0.020} | 4203±110 | |

== Specific exoplanet lists ==
Lists of exoplanets

- List of directly imaged exoplanets
- List of exoplanet extremes
- List of exoplanet firsts
- List of exoplanets discovered by the Kepler space telescope
- List of exoplanets observed during Kepler's K2 mission
- List of exoplanets discovered by the TESS mission
- List of terrestrial exoplanet candidates for atmosphere detection
- List of hottest exoplanets
- List of coldest exoplanets
- List of multiplanetary systems
- List of circumbinary planets
- List of nearest exoplanets
- List of nearest terrestrial exoplanet candidates
- List of potentially habitable exoplanets
- List of proper names of exoplanets
- List of largest exoplanets
- List of smallest exoplanets
- List of transiting exoplanets
- List of exoplanets and planetary debris around giant stars
- List of exoplanets and planetary debris around white dwarfs
- List of extrasolar planetary collisions

=== Lists of exoplanets by year of discovery ===
- List of exoplanets discovered before 2000 (31)
- List of exoplanets discovered between 2000–2009 (376)
- List of exoplanets discovered in 2010 (109)
- List of exoplanets discovered in 2011 (178)
- List of exoplanets discovered in 2012 (147)
- List of exoplanets discovered in 2013 (149)
- List of exoplanets discovered in 2014 (869)
- List of exoplanets discovered in 2015 (144)
- List of exoplanets discovered in 2016 (1497)
- List of exoplanets discovered in 2017 (152)
- List of exoplanets discovered in 2018 (300)
- List of exoplanets discovered in 2019 (169)
- List of exoplanets discovered in 2020 (256)
- List of exoplanets discovered in 2021 (253)
- List of exoplanets discovered in 2022 (312)
- List of exoplanets discovered in 2023 (304)
- List of exoplanets discovered in 2024 (284)
- List of exoplanets discovered in 2025 (239)
- List of exoplanets discovered in 2026 (359)
