= List of exoplanets discovered by the TESS mission =

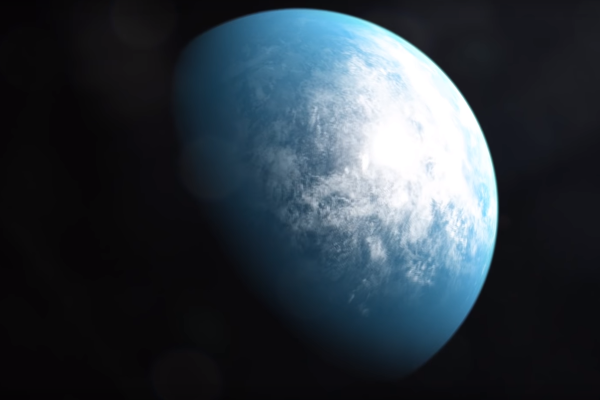
An artist's rendition of TOI-700 d, a potentially habitable exoplanet discovered using data transmitted by the TESS

The list of exoplanets detected by the Transiting Exoplanet Survey Satellite (TESS) contains bodies with a wide variety of properties, with significant ranges in orbital distances, masses, radii, composition, habitability, and host star type. As of 17 September 2025, the TESS Mission has detected 8,361 planets and confirmed 693 planets, including hot Jupiters, super-Earths, circumbinary planets, and planets located in the circumstellar habitable zones of their host stars. TESS has detected over 7,668 unconfirmed planet candidates.

== Table ==
Name	Mass (M_{J})	Radius (R_{J})	Period (days)	Semi-major axis (AU)	Temp. (K)	Discovery method	Distance (ly)	Host star	Host star mass (M_{☉})	Host star temp. (K)	Year of Discovery	Remarks
Earth (for reference)								Sun			–	
TESS Object of Interest (TOI)
TOI 122 b	0.028^{+0.029}_{−0.010}	0.243±0.016	5.078030±0.000015	0.0392±0.0007	471	transit	202.9±0.7	TOI-122	0.312±0.007	3403±100	2020	
TOI-125 b	0.0299±0.00277	0.2432±0.00669	4.65382±0.00033	0.05186^{+0.00086}_{−0.00077}	1037±11	transit	363.3382±1.435088	TOI-125	0.859^{+0.044}_{−0.038}	5320±39	2019	
TOI-125 c	0.02086±0.00311	0.24614±0.009	9.15059^{+0.0007}_{−0.00082}	0.814±0.0013	827.8±8.6	transit	363.3382±1.435088	TOI-125	0.859^{+0.044}_{−0.038}	5320±39	2019	
TOI-125 d	0.0428±0.0038	0.2614±0.0152	19.98^{+0.005}_{−0.0056}	0.05186^{+0.00086}_{−0.00077}	638.1±6.6	transit	363.3382±1.435088	TOI-125	0.859^{+0.044}_{−0.038}	5320±39	2019	
TOI-132 b	0.07048^{+0.00598}_{−0.00604}	0.305±0.012	2.1097019^{+0.000012}_{−0.000011}	0.026^{+0.002}_{−0.003}	1395^{+52}_{−72}	transit	536.43±89.11	TOI-132	0.970±0.06	5397±46	2020	
TOI-150 b	1.75^{+0.14}_{−0.17}	1.38±0.04	5.857342^{+0.000065}_{−0.000066}	0.0583^{+0.0013}_{−0.0018}	1493^{+29}_{−32}	transit	1095.89±6.52	TO-150	1.25^{+0.07}_{−0.12}	6003^{+104}_{−98}	2019	
TOI-157 b	1.18±0.13	1.29±0.02	2.0845435±0.0000023	0.03138^{+0.00025}_{−0.00020}	1588^{+21}_{−20}	transit	1171	TOI-157	0.948^{+0.023}_{−0.018}	5404^{+70}_{−67}	2020	
TOI-159 b	3.49±0.026	1.622±0.015	3.7628396	0.0560(7)		transit	347.2^{+3.91}_{−4.56619}	TOI-159	1.661^{+0.017}_{−0.019}	7294±70	2026	
TOI-163b	1.22	1.489	4.231306	0.0580	1669	transit	1359	TOI-163	1.44	6495	2019	
TOI-172b	5.42^{+0.22}_{−0.20}	0.965^{+0.032}_{−0.029}	9.47725^{+0.00064}_{−0.00079}	0.0914±0.0017		transit	1097.418	TOI-172	1.128^{+0.065}_{−0.061}	5645±50	2019	
TOI-175b	0.00126^{+0.00050}_{−0.00048}	0.0642^{+0.0046}_{−0.0035}	2.2531136^{+0.0000012}_{−0.0000015}	0.02191^{+0.00080}_{−0.00084}	627^{+33}_{−36}	transit	34.636±0.010	L 98-59	0.273±0.030	3415±135	2019	To date, it is the lowest mass planet confirmed, or measured, using the radial velocity technique. Host star also known as L 98-59.
GJ 3090 b (TOI-177 b)	0.0105	0.19	2.8531042±0.0000032	0.03165	696	transit	73.21±0.04	TOI-177	0.519±0.013	3556±70	2022	
HD 21749 b (TOI-186 b)	0.073^{+0.007}_{−0.006}	0.254^{+0.023}_{−0.020}	35.61253^{+0.00060}_{−0.00062}	0.1915^{+0.0058}_{−0.0063}	422^{+15}_{−14}	transit	53.261±0.023	HD 21749	0.73±0.07	4640±100	2019	
HD 21749 c (TOI-186 c)	<0.0116	0.0796^{+0.0057}_{−0.0052}	7.78993^{+0.00051}_{−0.00044}	0.0695^{+0.0021}_{−0.0023}	701^{+25}_{−23}	transit	53.261±0.023	HD 21749	0.73±0.07	4640±100	2019	
DS Tucanae Ab (TOI-200 b)		0.509±0.015	8.138268±0.000011		850	transit	143.89±0.22	DS Tucanae	1.01±0.06	5428±80	2019	
TOI-201 c	14.2±2.0	0.99±0.017	2,800^{+360}_{−210}	4.28^{+0.36}_{−0.2}		timing + transit	372.5	TOI-201	1.316±0.027	6,394±75	2025	
TOI-216 b	0.059±0.002	0.714^{+0.268}_{−0.179}	17.1607	0.1293^{+0.0067}_{−0.0051}	628^{+13}_{−11}	transit	583±3	TOI-216	0.77	5026±125	2019	Semi-major axes are strongly variable due to planet-planet interaction on a timescale of few years
TOI-216 c	0.56±0.02	0.902±0.018	34.525528	0.2069^{+0.0107}_{−0.0082}	497^{+10}_{−8}	transit	583±3	TOI-216	0.77	5026±125	2019	Semi-major axes are strongly variable due to planet-planet interaction on a timescale of few years
TOI-237 c		0.1076±0.0031	1.74486147	0.0160+0.0005 −0.0006	515+11 −8	transit	124.86	TOI-237	0.1698+0.0385 −0.0350	3226+47 −48	2026	
TOI-270b	0.0050	0.1112	3.360080	0.0306	528	transit	73.23	TOI-270	0.40	3386	2019	
TOI-270c	0.0193	0.216	5.660172	0.0472	424	transit	73.23	TOI-270	0.40	3386	2019	
TOI-270d	0.0150	0.190	11.38014	0.0733	340	transit	73.23	TOI-270	0.40	3386	2019	Hydrogen and steam atmosphere
TOI-333 b	0.0632±0.0076	0.3801±0.0098	3.785250±0.000006	0.049±0.001	1445	transit	1132	TOI-333	1.2±0.1	6,241±73	2025	
NGTS-6b (TOI-448 b)	1.339	1.326	0.8820590	0.01677		transit	1010	NGTS-6	0.77	4730	2019	
Gliese 238 b (TOI-486 b)		0.05049±0.0012	1.74	0.02123^{+0.00016}_{−0.00017}	758^{+16}_{−15}	transit	49.6	Gliese 238	0.419±0.01	3485±140	2024	Mars-sized exoplanet, one of the smallest exoplanets currently known
GJ 3473 b (TOI-488 b)	0.0059±0.0009	0.113^{+0.0045}_{−0.0044}	1.1980035^{+0.0000018}_{−0.0000019}	0.01589±0.00062	773^{+16}_{−15}	transit	89.29±0.13	GJ 3473	0.360±0.016	3347±54	2020	Potentially rocky world, larger than Earth, also called TOI-488 b
GJ 3473 c (TOI-488 c)	0.0233^{+0.0029}_{−0.0027}	0.235	15.509±0.033	0.0876^{+0.0035}_{−0.0034}	329.1^{+6.6}_{−6.4}	radial vel.	89.29±0.13	GJ 3473	0.360±0.016	3347±54	2020	Neptune-like ice giant also called TOI-488 c
TOI-512 b	0.01123^{+0.00167}_{−0.00173}	0.1374±0.0089	7.18886^{+0.000069}_{−0.000077}		1,009±29	transit	219.16±0.14	TOi-512	0.74±0.03	5,277±67	2025	
TOI-561 b	0.0050±0.0011	0.127±0.006	0.446578±0.000017	0.01055±0.00008		transit	279.2±1.6	TOI-561	0.785±0.018	5455^{+65}_{−47}	2020	
TOI-561 c	0.017±0.003	0.257±0.009	10.779±0.004	0.08809±0.0007		transit	279.2±1.6	TOI-561	0.785±0.018	5455^{+65}_{−47}	2020	
TOI-561 d	0.038±0.004	0.226±0.011	25.62±0.04	0.1569±0.0012		transit	279.2±1.6	TOI-561	0.785±0.018	5455^{+65}_{−47}	2020	
TOI-561 e	0.050±0.007	0.238±0.010	77.23±0.39	0.3274^{+0.0028}_{−0.0027}		transit	279.2±1.6	TOI-561	0.785±0.018	5455^{+65}_{−47}	2020	
TOI-564b	1.463^{+0.10}_{−0.096}	1.02^{+0.71}_{−0.29}	1.651144±0.000018	0.02734^{+0.00061}_{−0.00053}	1714^{+20}_{−21}	transit	643.8±5.9	TOI-564	0.998^{+0.068}_{−0.057}	5640^{+34}_{−37}	2019	
TOI-700 b	0.00406^{+0.003}_{−0.00116}	0.0901^{+0.00839}_{−0.00776}	9.97701^{+0.00024}_{−0.00028}	0.0637^{+0.0064}_{−0.006}		transit	101.5	TOI-700	0.416±0.01	3480±135	2020	
TOI-700 c	0.0249^{+0.0085}_{−0.0057}	0.2346^{+0.0214}_{−0.0205}	16.051998^{+0.000089}_{−0.000092}	0.0925^{+0.0088}_{−0.0083}		transit	101.5	TOI-700	0.416±0.01	3480±135	2020	
TOI-700 d	0.00711^{+0.0022}_{−0.00164}	0.1062±0.0098	37.426^{+0.0007}_{−0.001}	0.163±0.015	295±55	transit	101.5	TOI-700	0.416±0.01	3480±135	2020	First "Earth sized" discovered by TESS
TOI-771 c	0.00903		7.61	0.046±0.002	365	radial vel.	82.45	TOI-771	0.22±0.024	3,201±100	2025	
TOI-905b	0.667^{+0.042}_{−0.041}	1.171^{+0.052}_{−0.051}	3.739494±0.000038	0.04666^{+0.00096}_{−0.0011}	1192^{+39}_{−36}	transit	489.9^{+23.5}_{−22.5}	TOI-905	0.968^{+0.061}_{−0.068}	5570^{+150}_{−140}	2019	
TOI-1117 b	0.028±0.003	0.219^{+0.012}_{−0.011}	2.22816±0.00001	0.0330±0.0002	1,538±21	transit	546.64±2.94	TOI-1117	0.97±0.02	5,635±62	2025	
TOI-1117 c	0.0276^{+0.0037}_{−0.0038}		4.579±0.004	0.0534±0.0003	1,210±16	radial vel.	546.64±2.94	TOI-1117	0.97±0.02	5,635±62	2025	
TOI-1117 d	0.0337±0.0050		8.665±0.011	0.0817±0.0006	978±13	radial vel.	546.64±2.94	TOI-1117	0.97±0.02	5,635±62	2025	
TOI-1243 b	0.0242±0.0047	0.2079±0.0107	4.65948	0.0437±0.0001	450	transit	140.6	TOI-1243	0.515±0.027	3,515±79	2026	
TOI-3862 b	0.1688+0.0087 −0.0090	0.493±0.016	1.55745774	0.02539+0.00064 −0.00068	1539	transit	801.2	TOI-3861	0.90±0.07	5300±50	2026	
TOI-4336 Ac		0.1039+0.0054 −0.0052	7.587270	0.0481±0.0027	378±12	transit	73.23	TOI-4336	0.2853+0.0438 −0.0356	3369+51 −57	2026	
TOI-4495 b	0.024+0.004 −0.05	0.221+0.012 −0.008	2.56699	0.03957±0.00047	1735	transit	801.2	TOI-4495	1.247±0.045	6210±70	2026	
TOI-4529 b	0.0154	0.1579±0.008	5.87958	0.04997±0.0008	511	transit	92.6	TOI-4529	0.482±0.023	3,697±71	2026	
BD-14 3065 b (TOI-4987 b)	12.11^{+0.95}_{−0.91}	1.926±0.094	4.3	0.0646±0.0026	3520±130	transit	1847.4	BD-14 3065	1.4±0.06	6985±90	2024	Located in a triple star system. It orbits the primary component of the system (BD-14 3065 A), a subgiant star. Also known as TOI-4987 b
TOI-5788 b	0.0117±0.0030	0.1365±0.0067	6.340758	0.0640±0.0011		transit	318.2	TOI-5788	0.87±0.04	5615±25	2026	
TOI-5788 c	0.0201±0.0038	0.2025±0.0036	16.213358	0.1197±0.0020		transit	318.2	TOI-5788	0.87±0.04	5615±25	2026	
Gliese 12 b (TOI-6251 b)	0.002769^{+0.00123}_{−0.0008}	0.0892±0.0089 (Note: The radius is the same as that of the Earth, with an uncertainty of 10%)	12.7	0.066±0.002	315±5	transit	39.65	Gliese 12	0.241±0.006	3253±55	2024	
HD 101581 b (TOI-6276 b)		0.0877	4.47			transit	41.7	HD 101581	0.740±0.087	4675±53	2024	Host star is the brightest star with multiple known transiting Earth-size exoplanets. Another transiting planet in the system is suspected.
HD 101581 c (TOI-6276 c)		0.0925	6.21			transit	41.7	HD 101581	0.740±0.087	4675±53	2024	Host star is the brightest star with multiple known transiting Earth-size exoplanets. Another transiting planet in the system is suspected.
TOI-6716 b		0.0874±0.0062	4.71859	0.032±0.003	369	transit	61.6	TOI-6716	0.223±0.011	3,110±80	2026	
TOI-7384 b		0.3176±0.0187	6.23403	0.0439±0.004	378	transit	218	TOI-7384	0.318±0.016	3,185±75	2026	
TESS Input Catalog (TIC)
TIC 237913194b	1.942^{+0.092}_{−0.091}	1.117^{+0.054}_{−0.047}	15.168865±0.000018	0.1207±0.0037	974	transit	1009±6	TIC 237913194	1.026^{+0.057}_{−0.055}	5788±80	2020	Very eccentric orbit
BD+05 4868 Ab (TIC 466376085 b)	0.000063	0.028	1.27187	0.0208±0.0003	1,820±45	transit	142.4±0.1	BD+05 4868	0.70±0.02	4,596^{+65}_{−64}	2025	A disintegrating planet with a comet-like tail.
TIC 88785435 b		0.449±0.019	10.508843	0.08432±0.00068	635±16	transit	398.2±0.8	TIC 88785435	0.724±0.017	3,998±95	2025	

back to top

== See also ==
- Lists of exoplanets
- List of exoplanets discovered in 2018
- List of exoplanets discovered in 2019
- List of exoplanets discovered in 2020
- List of exoplanets discovered in 2021
- List of exoplanets discovered in 2022
- List of exoplanets discovered in 2023
- List of exoplanets discovered in 2024
- List of exoplanets discovered in 2025
- List of exoplanets discovered in 2026
- List of exoplanets discovered by the Kepler space telescope
- Exoplanet
