= AT2021ueyLb =

Jupiter-like exoplanet orbits AT2021ueyL

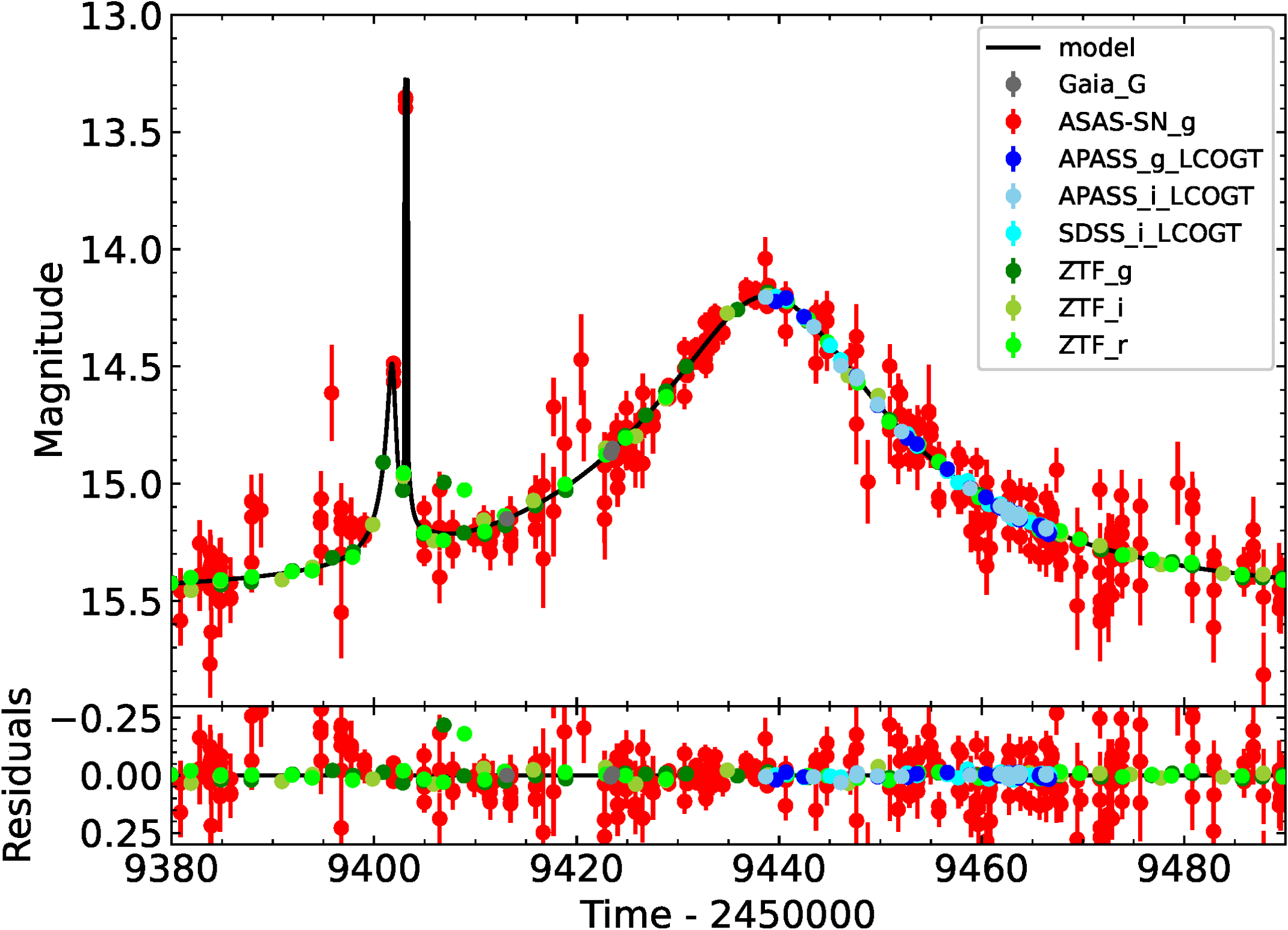
- Photometric data and fitted light curve of the event AT2021uey

Discovery
- Discovered by: Makiko Ban et al.
- Discovery date: March 28, 2025
- Detection method: Microlensing

Orbital characteristics
- Semi-major axis: 4.01+1.68 −1.34 AU
- Orbital period (sidereal): 4170+2910 −1710 d
- Star: AT2021ueyL

Physical characteristics
- Mean radius: 1.22 R_{J} (estimate)
- Mass: 1.34+0.45 −0.50 M_{J}

AT2021ueyLb is an exoplanet orbiting the star AT2021ueyL, located 3392 light-years away from Earth in the constellation Pegasus. The planet was discovered in 2021 using the gravitational microlensing method.

The microlensing event was initially detected by the Gaia space telescope as part of its transient monitoring program. The initial event was given the internal designation Gaia21dnc. Subsequently, ground-based observatories, including the Molėtai Astronomical Observatory in Lithuania and the KMTNet telescope network, joined the observations. Analysis of anomalies in the light curve confirmed the presence of a planetary companion to the lensing star. After thorough verification and data analysis, scientists were finally able to determine that it is a gas giant located at a distance of 3392 light-years, with a mass 1.34 times that of Jupiter. The NASA Exoplanet Archive estimates the planet's radius at 1.22 Rj. It orbits a low-mass M1V type red dwarf star, with a mass of 0.49 Solar masses and an effective temperature of 3680 K. The planet completes one orbit around its star in 4170 days, with a projected distance to the star of 4.01 astronomical units.

It is one of the few planets found by Gaia using microlensing in the galactic halo, rather than its central bulge.

== See also ==
- List of exoplanets discovered in 2025
- Gaia (spacecraft)
- Molėtai Astronomical Observatory
