= KMT-2024-BLG-0404L =

Star in the constellation Sagittarius

- Artistic rendering of the exoplanet system KMT-2024-BLG-0404L

Observation data Epoch J2000.0 Equinox J2000.0
- Constellation: Sagittarius
- Right ascension: 18^{h} 04^{m} 35.300^{s}
- Declination: −27° 57′ 12.60″

Characteristics
- Evolutionary stage: main sequence
- Spectral type: M

Astrometry
Distance	23,510 ly (7,210 pc)

Details
Mass	0.090+0.133 −0.046 M_{☉}

Other designations
- OGLE-2024-BLG-0378

Database references
SIMBAD	data

KMT-2024-BLG-0404L (also known as OGLE-2024-BLG-0378L) is a low-mass red dwarf located in the direction of the Galactic Bulge at a distance of 23,510 light-years, or approximately 7,210 parsecs, in the constellation Sagittarius.

== Planetary system ==
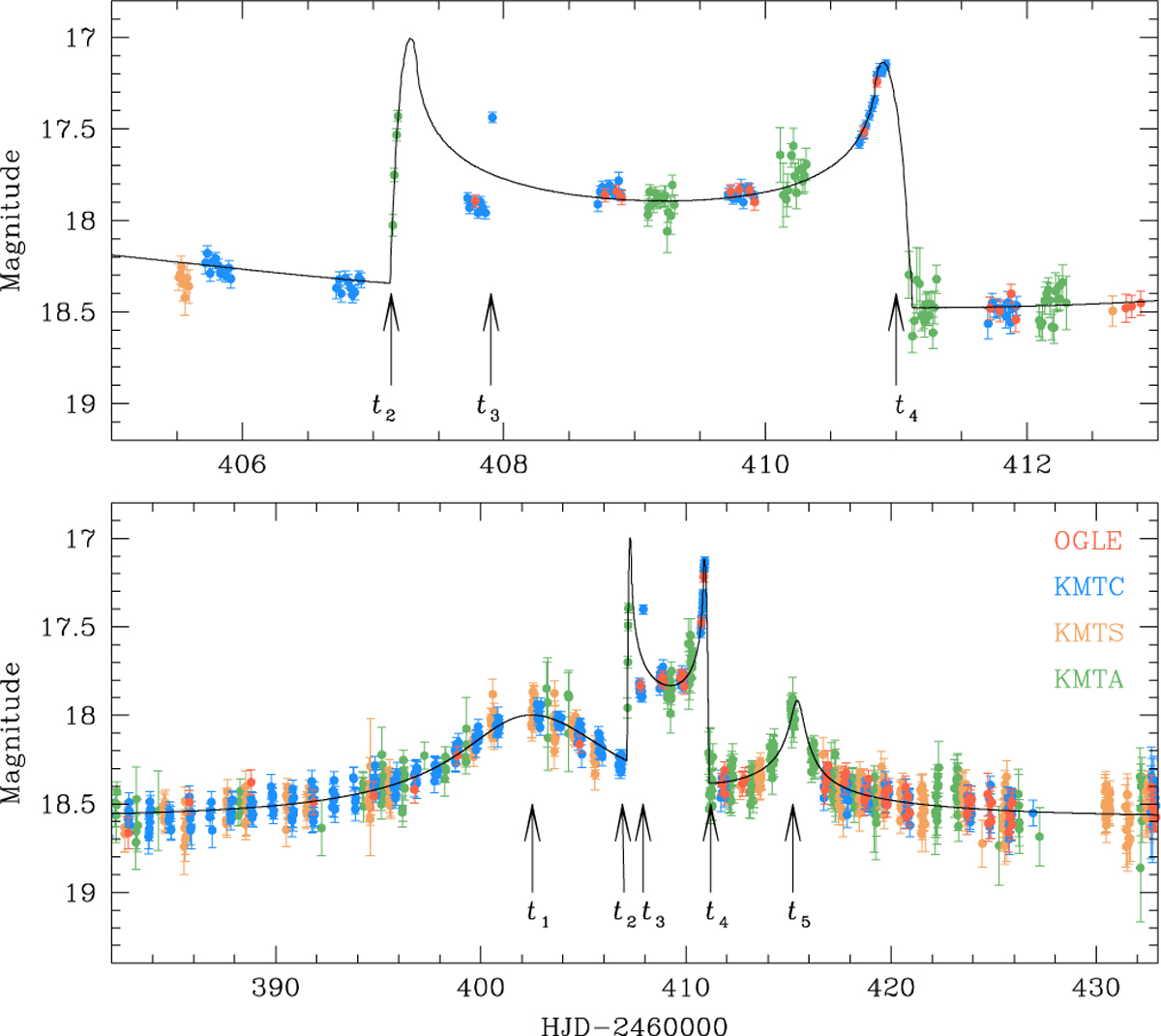
Light curve of the lensing event KMT-2024-BLG-0404

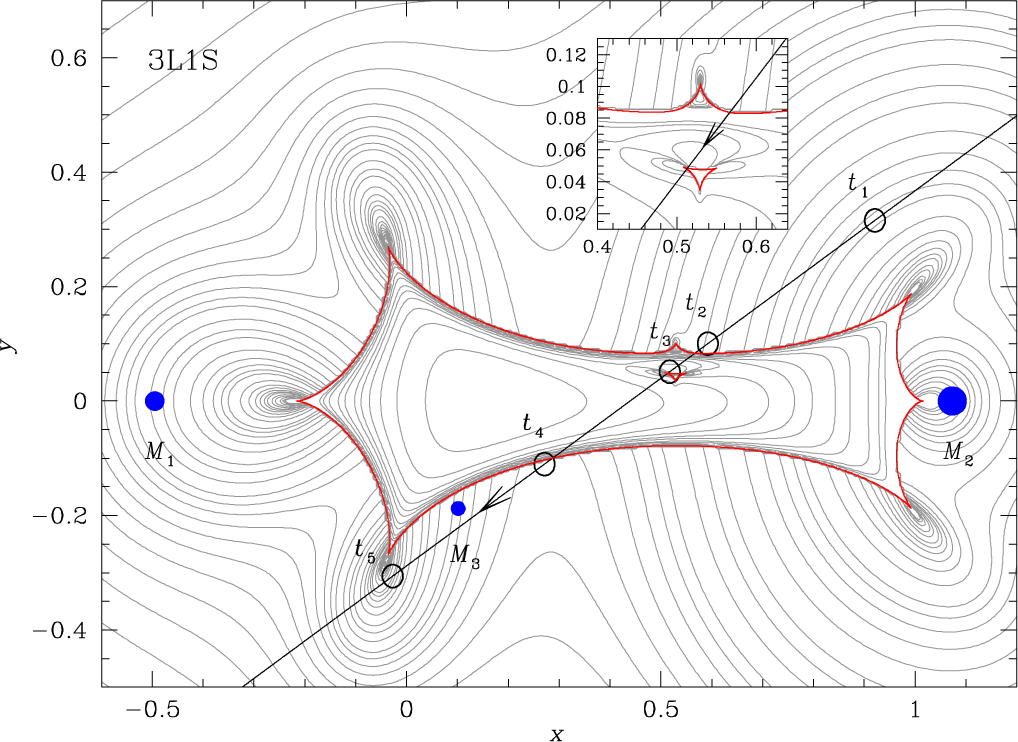
Lens system configuration for the 3L1S model

Around the star KMT-2024-BLG-0404L, two planetary-mass objects were discovered in 2025 using the gravitational microlensing method. The first component, designated KMT-2024-BLG-0404Lb, is an exoplanet with a mass of 17.3 Earth masses and a projected separation of 0.34 astronomical units. The second component of the system, designated KMT-2024-BLG-0404Lc, is a brown dwarf with a mass of 26 Jupiter masses. The projected separation between the star and the brown dwarf is 0.85 astronomical units from the star. To ensure dynamical stability in the system, the planet should orbit only one of the host stars, and the separation between the binary components must be considerably greater than the distance from the planet to its host.

Based on the estimated masses of the lens components, the system is identified as a planetary system in which a Neptune-mass planet orbits within a binary consisting of a late M dwarf and a brown dwarf.

The KMT-2024-BLG-0404L planetary system
Companion (in order from star)	Mass	Semimajor axis (AU)	Orbital period (days)	Eccentricity	Inclination	Radius
b	17.3+25.5 −8.8 M_{🜨}	0.34+0.04 −0.05	—	—	—	—
с	26.0+38.0 −13.0 M_{J}	0.85±0.11	—	—	—	—

== See also ==
- List of extrasolar planets
- KMTNet
