= AT 2021uey =

Star in the constellation Pegasus

Observation data Epoch J2000.0 Equinox ICRS
- Constellation: Pegasus
- Right ascension: 21^{h} 38^{m} 10.83^{s}
- Declination: +26° 27′ 59.78″

Characteristics
- Evolutionary stage: Main sequence
- Spectral type: M1V

Astrometry
| Distance | 3,392 ly (1,040 pc) |

Details
| Mass | 0.49+0.16 −0.18 M_{☉} |
| Temperature | 3680+307 −204 K |

Other designations
- Gaia21dnc, ZTF18abktckv, ASASSN-21mc, UCAC4 583-124062, 2MASS J21381082+2627598, Gaia DR3 1800388069295514496

Database references
| SIMBAD | data |

AT 2021uey (originally Gaia 21dnc) is a star located in the galactic disk at a distance of 3392 light-years, or approximately 1040 parsecs, from the Sun, in the constellation of Pegasus.

It is a red dwarf with a mass of 0.49 solar masses and a temperature of 3680 Kelvin. One exoplanet orbits around it, which was detected in 2021 using the gravitational microlensing method and subsequently discovered in 2025.

== Planetary system ==
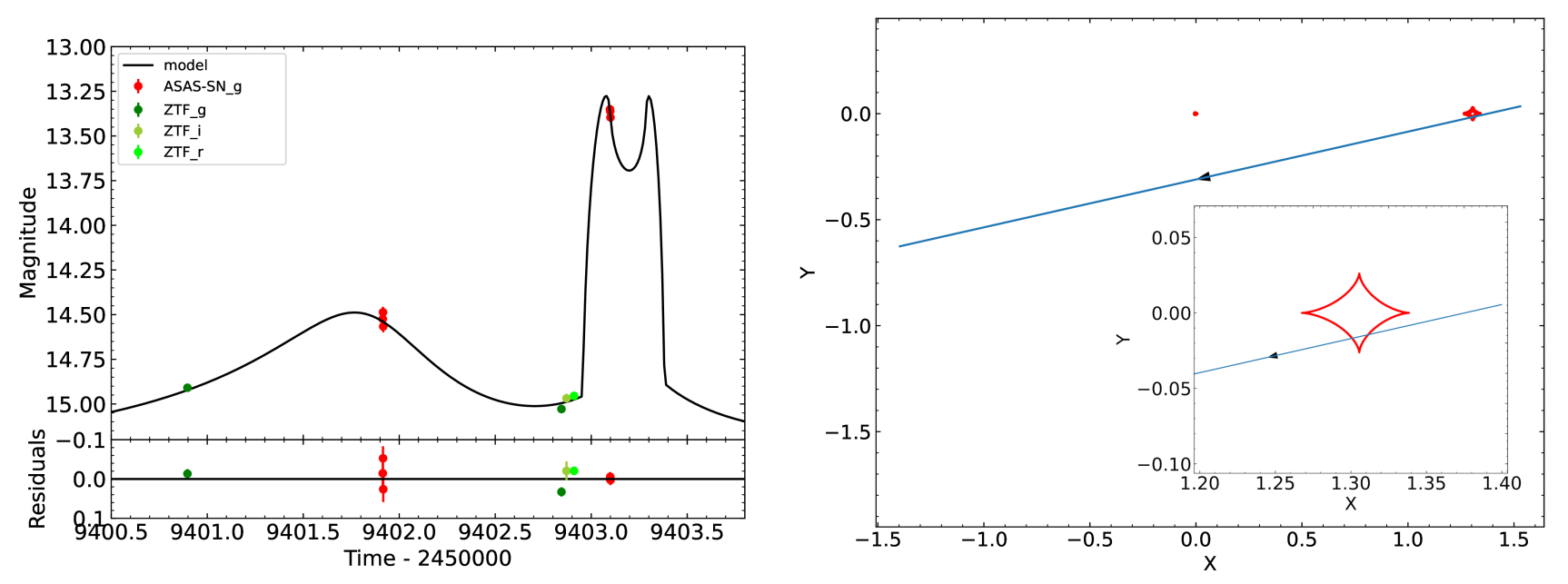
Photometric data and fitted light curve of the anomaly part of the event AT2021uey (left panel) and the plot of the source trajectory in the lens frame (right panel).

The Gaia space telescope detected a microlensing event as part of its transient search program, assigning it the internal designation Gaia21dnc. Subsequently, ground-based facilities, specifically the Molėtai Astronomical Observatory in Lithuania and the KMTNet telescope network, joined the observations. Analysis of anomalies in the light curve indicated the presence of a planetary companion to the lensing star. Based on thorough data processing, it was determined that this object is a gas giant with a mass of 1.34 Jupiter masses, and its projected distance from the parent star is estimated at 4.01 astronomical units. According to the NASA Exoplanet Archive, the planet's radius is 1.22 Jupiter radius. The planet completes one orbit around its star in 4170 Earth days.

The AT 2021uey planetary system
| Companion (in order from star) | Mass | Semimajor axis (AU) | Orbital period (days) | Eccentricity | Inclination (°) | Radius |
|---|---|---|---|---|---|---|
| b | 1.34+0.45 −0.50 M_{J} | 4.01+1.68 −1.34 | 4170+2910 −1710 | — | — | — |

== See also ==
- List of exoplanets
- Gaia (spacecraft)
- Molėtai Astronomical Observatory
