= KMT-2024-BLG-0404Lb =

Neptune-like exoplanet in orbit around KMT-2024-BLG-0404L

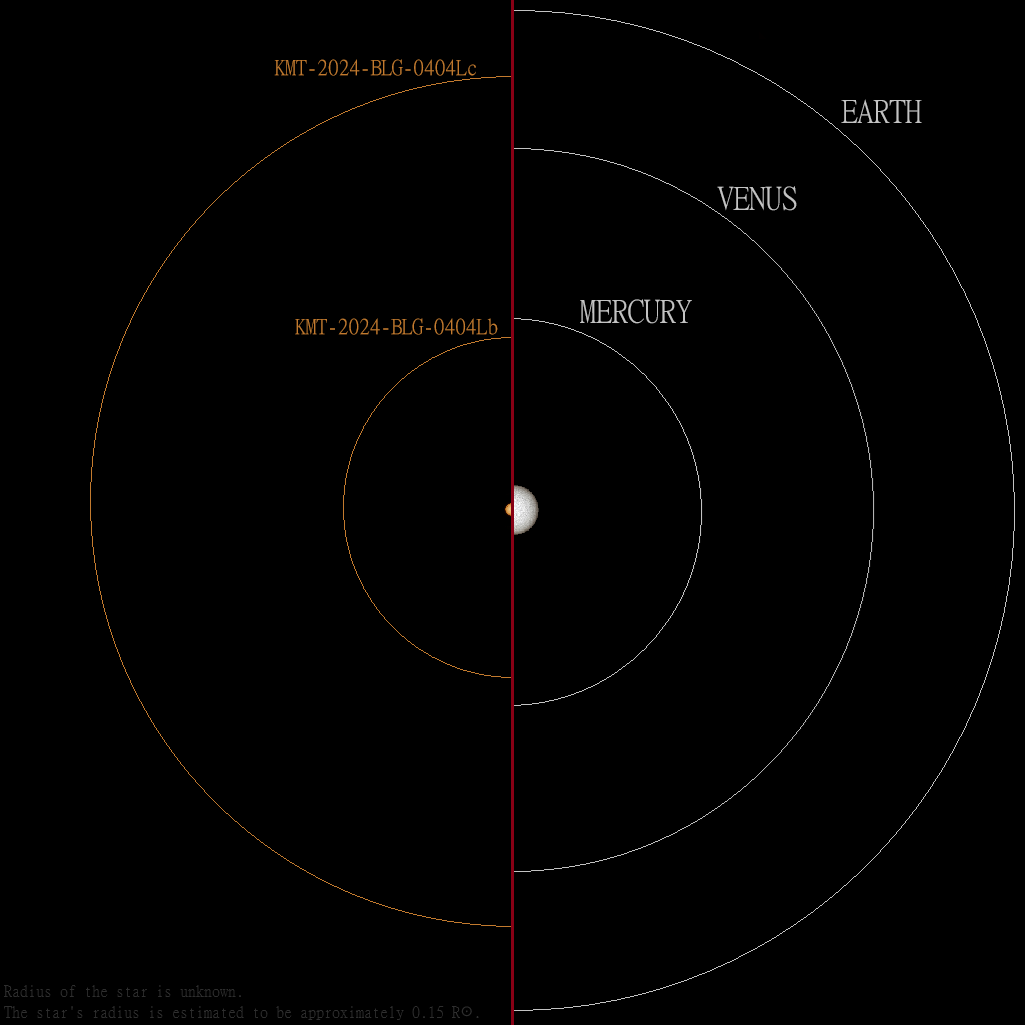
- An illustration of the exoplanetary system KMT-2024-BLG-0404L in comparison to the inner Solar System. KMT-2024-BLG-0404Lb is the innermost planet in the system.

Discovery
- Discovered by: Cheongho Han et al.
- Discovery site: KMTNet, OGLE
- Discovery date: July 9, 2025
- Detection method: Microlensing

Orbital characteristics
- Semi-major axis: 0.34+0.04 −0.05 AU
- Star: KMT-2024-BLG-0404L

Physical characteristics
- Mean radius: 0.386 R_{J} (4.24 R_{🜨}) - estimate
- Mass: 17.3+25.5 −8.8 M_{🜨}

KMT-2024-BLG-0404Lb is a exoplanet located 23,510 light-years away, or approximately 7,210 parsecs, in the constellation Sagittarius. It orbits the late red dwarf KMT-2024-BLG-0404L, which is part of a binary system. The planet was discovered in 2025 using the gravitational microlensing method.

== Properties ==
The object is a Neptune-like planet with a mass of 17.3+25.5
−8.8 M_{🜨}. Its projected distance from the star is 0.34+0.04
−0.05 AU. The NASA Exoplanet Archive estimated the planet's radius at 0.386 R_{J}, or 4.24 R_{🜨}. To ensure dynamical stability in the system, the planet should orbit only one of the host stars, and the separation between the binary components must be considerably greater than the distance from the planet to its host.

This exoplanet is unique because it orbits not a single star, but a close binary pair consisting of a late M-type dwarf and a brown dwarf, separated by 0.85±0.11 AU. This is the first such discovery.

== See also ==
- List of exoplanets discovered in 2025
- List of extrasolar planets
- KMTNet
- Optical Gravitational Lensing Experiment or OGLE
