= R Velorum =

R Velorum can refer to two different stars:

- HD 87816 used to go by the variable star designation R Velorum, but now is not suspected to be variable, and the designation has been dropped. It has two known exoplanets.
- HD 89998 goes by the Bayer designation r Velorum.
