= OGLE-2016-BLG-0007Lb =

Super-Earth in a Jupiter-like orbit

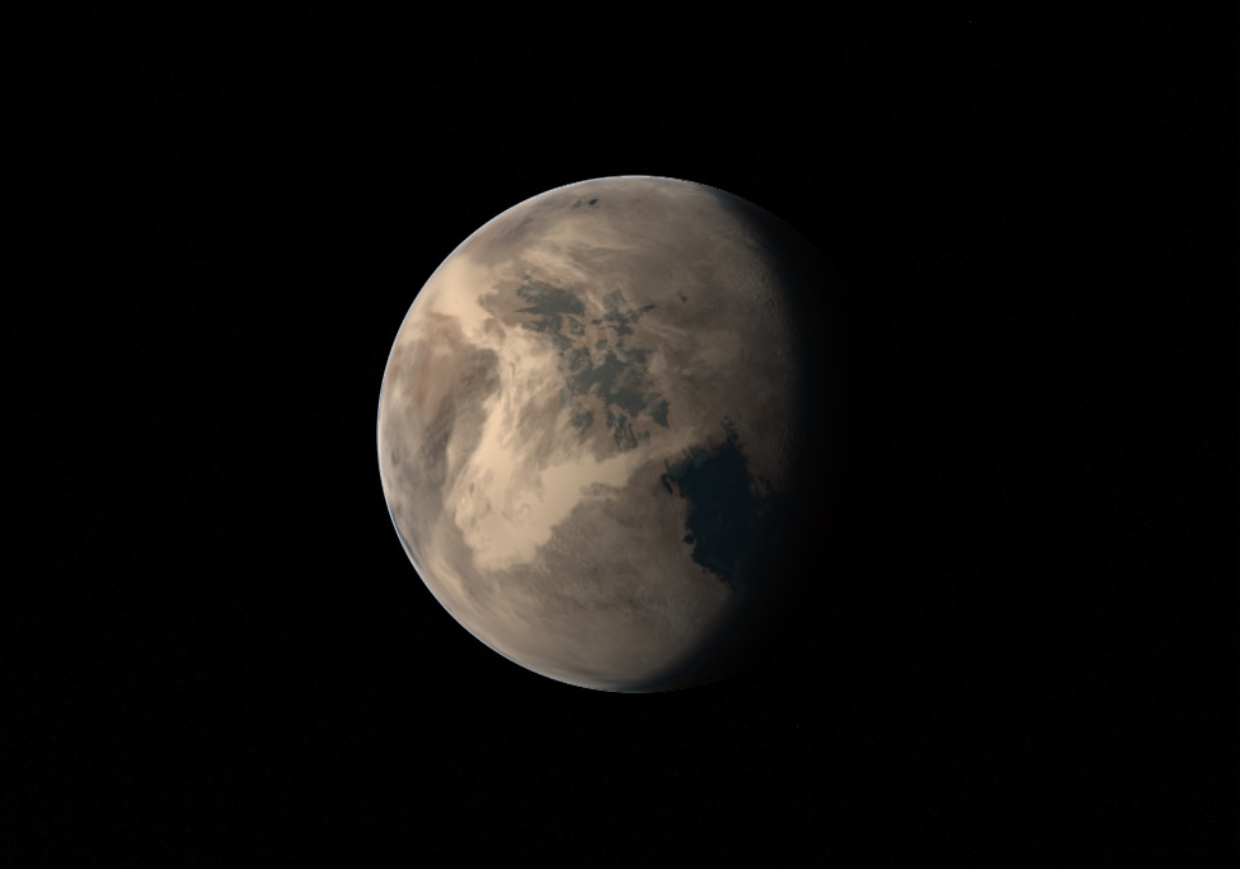
- Artistic representation of exoplanet OGLE-2016-BLG-0007Lb, featuring seas of liquid nitrogen on its surface

Discovery
- Discovered by: Weicheng Zang et al.
- Discovery site: OGLE
- Discovery date: April 28, 2025
- Detection method: Microlensing

Orbital characteristics
- Semi-major axis: 10.1+3.8 −3.4 AU
- Orbital period (sidereal): 39+21 −9 years
- Star: OGLE-2016-BLG-0007L

Physical characteristics
- Mean radius: 1.09 R_{🜨} (estimate)
- Mass: 1.32+0.91 −0.67 M_{🜨}

OGLE-2016-BLG-0007Lb is an exoplanet located approximately 14,020 light-years or 4,300 parsecs from Earth, in the constellation Sagittarius, orbiting the star OGLE-2016-BLG-0007L, (Note: OGLE-2016-BLG-0007 refers to the microlensing event in which this system was detected; "L" indicates the lens star.) which has a mass of 0.59+0.41
−0.30 M_{☉}.

Light curve of OGLE-2016-BLG-0007

The planet was discovered in April 2025 using gravitational microlensing method developed by the Korea Astronomy and Space Science Institute and the Spitzer Space Telescope. The object is a super-Earth with a mass of 1.32 M🜨 and is located 10.1 AU from its star, which is slightly further than Saturn. One year on this planet is equivalent to 39 Earth years. The NASA Exoplanet Archive estimated the planet's radius at 1.09 R🜨

Scientists hypothesize that OGLE-2016-BLG-0007Lb is the core of a giant planet that failed to accrete enough gas from the protoplanetary disk to become a gas giant, similar to Jupiter or Saturn.

== See also ==
- List of exoplanets discovered in 2025
- Optical Gravitational Lensing Experiment
