= HD 224018 =

High-proper-motion star with three exoplanets

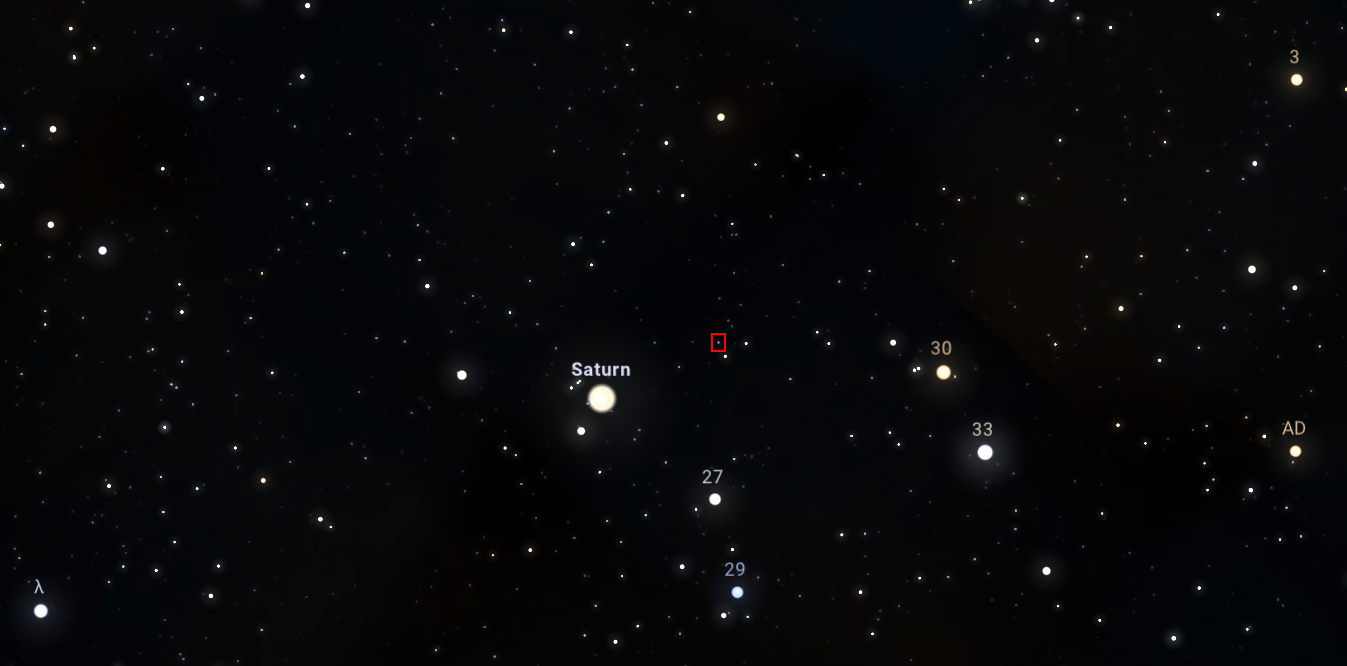
- Location of HD 224018 in the night sky. The star is marked within the red rectangle.

Observation data Epoch J2016.0 Equinox ICRS
- Constellation: Aquarius
- Right ascension: 23^{h} 54^{m} 33.48^{s}
- Declination: −04° 43′ 23.9″
- Apparent magnitude (V): 9.715±0.005

Characteristics
- Evolutionary stage: main sequence
- Spectral type: G5 V

Astrometry
Radial velocity (R_{v})	−62.75±0.17 km/s
Proper motion (μ)	RA: −112.585 mas/yr Dec.: −8.324 mas/yr
Parallax (π)	9.3912±0.0214 mas
Distance	347.3 ± 0.8 ly (106.5 ± 0.2 pc)

Details
Mass	1.013+0.069 −0.061 M_{☉}
Radius	1.147±0.028 R_{☉}
Luminosity	1.33+0.04 −0.05 L_{☉}
Surface gravity (log g)	4.32+0.04 −0.05 cgs
Temperature	5,784±60 K
Metallicity [Fe/H]	0.05±0.05 dex
Rotational velocity (v sin i)	2.1±0.5 km/s
Age	7.0+3.4 −3.2 Gyr

Other designations
- BD−05 6079, HD 224018, SAO 146968, K2-420, EPIC 246214735, TYC 5256-992-1, GSC 05256-00992, 2MASS J23543349-0443238

Database references
SIMBAD	data
Exoplanet Archive	data

HD 224018 is a high-proper-motion G5 V type star. It has surface temperature of 5,784±60 K. HD 224018 has a yellow hue and is not visible to the naked eye with an apparent visual magnitude of 9.715±0.005. Based upon parallax measurements, it is located 347 light-years (106 parsecs) in distance from the Sun. The object is drifting towards the Sun with a radial velocity of −62.75±0.17 km/s.

== Planetary system ==
In 2025, three exoplanets planets orbiting HD 224018 were discovered by both the radial velocity and transit methods. A fourth candidate planet is suspected.

The HD 224018 planetary system
Companion (in order from star)	Mass	Semimajor axis (AU)	Orbital period (days)	Eccentricity	Inclination (°)	Radius
b	0.013±0.003 M_{J}	0.0952±00.0020	10.6413±0.0028	0.060+0.070 −0.040	—	0.0812+0.0571 −0.0509 R_{J}
c	≥0.0327+0.0041 −0.0035 M_{J}	0.217±0.005	36.57669+0.00019 −0.00017	0.02±0.02	—	0.216+0.006 −0.007 R_{J}
d	0.013+0.006 −0.005 M_{J}	0.53+0.06 −0.02	138.0731+27.6127 −0.0050	0.04+0.05 −0.04	—	0.21±0.01 R_{J}
e (unconfirmed)	≥151+13 −14 M_{🜨}	8.60+1.50 −1.60	9129.0+2499.0 −2479.0	0.60+0.07 −0.08	—	—

== See also ==
- List of exoplanets discovered in 2025
