= HIP 41378 f =

Extrasolar planet in the constellation Cancer that may have ring

Discovery
- Discovered by: K2 (Vanderburg et al.)
- Discovery date: June 2016
- Detection method: Transit

Orbital characteristics
- Semi-major axis: 1.3856+0.0094 −0.0090 au
- Eccentricity: 0.052+0.025 −0.052
- Orbital period (sidereal): 542.0797±0.0001 d
- Inclination: 89.948°±0.008°
- Star: HIP 41378

Physical characteristics
- Mean radius: 9.47±0.07 R_{🜨} (or 3.7+0.3 −0.2 R_{🜨} with rings)
- Mass: 25±5 M_{🜨}
- Mean density: 0.16+0.03 −0.04 g/cm^{3} (or 2.3 g/cm^{3} with rings)
- Temperature: T_{eq}: 294 K (21 °C; 70 °F)

HIP 41378 f (also known as EPIC 211311380 f) is an exoplanet orbiting around the F-type star HIP 41378. It is the outermost planet of its system and notable for the possibility that the planet may host circumplanetary debris rings. It is located within the optimistic habitable zone of its parent star.

A 2023 study analyzed the orbital stability and detectability of a hypothetical Mars-sized exomoon orbiting HIP 41378 f, finding that the existence of such a moon is feasible but is currently unlikely to be detectable.

== Potential ring system ==
HIP 41378 f has an anomalously large radius (9.2 R_{🜨}) for a planet of its size and temperature. This radius, combined with its measured mass of (12 M_{🜨}), suggest that its core has a maximum mass of 3 M_{🜨} and subsequently the planet has an envelope fraction of 75% or greater. This envelope fraction is larger than would be possible in the core accretion model of planet formation for a planet with its core mass, which is consistent with the hypothesis that the planet's radius may be observed to be larger than it actually is due to an optically thick ring system. Said ring system would have a density roughly equivalent to that of water, indicating that if it exists it is composed of porous rocky material. A 2026 study revised the mass of HIP 41378 f upwards, to 25 M_{🜨}, which still makes it a super-puff with a density of 0.16 g/cm^{3}, and makes the ring hypothesis still plausible.

One proposed origin for such a ring system is an exomoon, which migrated outwards and had its eccentricity raised until it got tidally disrupted. No atmospheric signatures were found as of 2022, further reinforcing the hypothesis of opaque circumplanetary rings.

== See also ==
- Lists of exoplanets
- GJ 1132 b, rocky exoplanet without atmosphere.
- Mu Arae c, in the constellation Ara
- Planetary system
- Exomoon
