= OGLE-2016-BLG-0007 =

Star in the constellation Sagittarius

Observation data Epoch J2000.0 Equinox ICRS
- Constellation: Sagittarius
- Right ascension: 17^{h} 53^{m} 25.45^{s}
- Declination: −29° 38′ 32.1″

Characteristics
- Spectral type: K?

Astrometry
Distance	14,000+3,600 −4,600 ly (4,300+1,100 −1,400 pc)

Details
Mass	0.59+0.41 −0.30 M_{☉}

Other designations
- KMT-2016-BLG-1991, MOA-2016-BLG-088

Database references
SIMBAD	data

OGLE-2016-BLG-0007(also known as MOA-2016-BLG-088L) is a Galactic bulge star believed to be of spectral type K, located approximately 14,020 light-years or 4,300 parsecs from Earth in the constellation Sagittarius.

== Planetary system ==
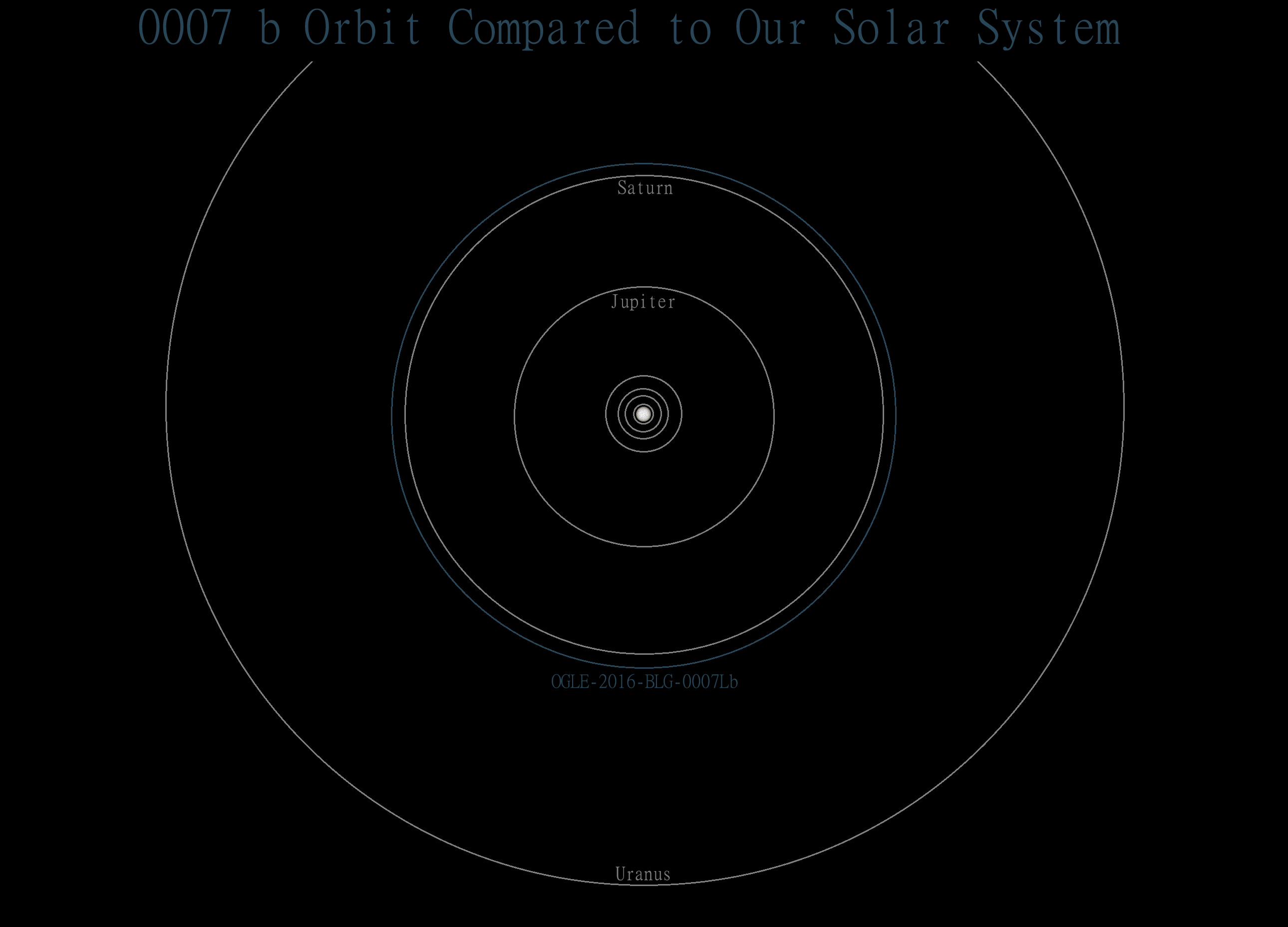
Illustration of the exoplanetary system OGLE-2016-BLG-0007L in comparison to the Solar System

The star OGLE-2016-BLG-0007L has one known planet, discovered in 2025 using the gravitational microlensing method. The object, named OGLE-2016-BLG-0007Lb, is a super-Earth with a mass of 1.32 M_{🜨} and is located at a distance of 10.1 astronomical units, similar to Saturn's distance from the Sun. The exoplanet's orbital period is approximately 39 years. The radius of OGLE-2016-BLG-0007Lb has not been measured, but it was estimated by the NASA Eyes on Exoplanets program to be 1.09 R🜨. Scientists believe this object is the core of a giant planet that did not have enough time to accumulate gas from the protoplanetary disk to become a gas giant similar to Jupiter or Saturn.

The OGLE-2016-BLG-0007 planetary system
Companion (in order from star)	Mass	Semimajor axis (AU)	Orbital period (days)	Eccentricity	Inclination (°)	Radius
b	1.32+0.91 −0.67 M_{🜨}	10.1+3.8 −3.4	14200+7700 −3300	—	—	—

== See also ==
- List of extrasolar planets
- Optical Gravitational Lensing Experiment or OGLE
