= HIP 41378 =

Star in the constellation Cancer

Observation data Epoch J2000 Equinox ICRS
- Constellation: Cancer
- Right ascension: 08^{h} 26^{m} 27.84909^{s}
- Declination: +10° 04′ 49.3342″
- Apparent magnitude (V): 8.92

Characteristics
- Evolutionary stage: Main sequence
- Spectral type: F8

Astrometry
Radial velocity (R_{v})	50.42±0.37 km/s
Proper motion (μ)	RA: −48.002(20) mas/yr Dec.: 0.062(15) mas/yr
Parallax (π)	9.4360±0.0208 mas
Distance	345.7 ± 0.8 ly (106.0 ± 0.2 pc)
Absolute magnitude (M_{V})	+3.65

Details
Mass	1.245+0.037 −0.043 M_{☉}
Radius	1.299±0.002 R_{☉}
Luminosity	2.44 L_{☉}
Surface gravity (log g)	4.32±0.02 cgs
Temperature	6,371±65 K
Metallicity [Fe/H]	0.046±0.044 dex
Rotation	7.8±1.0 d
Rotational velocity (v sin i)	7.5±0.5 km/s
Age	1.8+0.7 −0.6 Gyr

Other designations
- AG+10 1097, BD+10 1799, HIP 41378, SAO 97816, PPM 125260, K2-93, EPIC 211311380, TOI-4304, TIC 366443426, TYC 800-1325-1, YZ 10 3402

Database references
SIMBAD	data
Exoplanet Archive	data

HIP 41378 is a star located 346 light-years away in the constellation of Cancer. The star has an apparent magnitude of 8.92. This F-type main sequence dwarf has a mass of 1.245 M_{☉} and a radius of 1.299 R_{☉}. It has a surface temperature of about 6,371 K.

== Planetary system ==
In 2016, the K2 Kepler mission discovered five planets around HIP 41378, with sizes ranging from 2 times the size of Earth to the size of Jupiter, out to about 1 AU for the outermost planet. The semi-major axes were not known until K2 Haute-Provence Observatory radial velocity data was obtained in 2019. Also, a sixth non-transiting planet, HIP 41378 g, was discovered, along with speculation that additional planets may exist between HIP 41378 g and HIP 41378 d. The planet HIP 41378 f was also found to likely have optically-thick rings or a highly extended atmosphere. In 2026, radial velocity evidence for a seventh planet, named HIP 41378 h, with an orbital period of 2,600 days was found. However, it remains uncertain if the variations are caused by a planet or a magnetic cycle.

The stellar rotation of HIP 41378 appears to be misaligned relative to the orbit of HIP 41378 f, and thus likely the other planets' orbits as well.

Based on HIP 41378 e’s mass of 5 Earth masses and its orbital period of 393 days there is a low chance of it being habitable, though these calculations are somewhat radical.

The HIP 41378 planetary system
Companion (in order from star)	Mass	Semimajor axis (AU)	Orbital period (days)	Eccentricity	Inclination (°)	Radius
b	6.9±0.5 M_{🜨}	0.1300±0.0009	15.57209±0.00002	0.05+0.03 −0.05	88.847±0.048	2.640+0.022 −0.024 R_{🜨}
c	5.97+0.56 −0.86 M_{🜨}	0.2088±0.0014	31.70591±0.00005	0.044+0.022 −0.044	88.475±0.013	2.740+0.043 −0.049 R_{🜨}
g	6.81+1.14 −0.98 M_{🜨}	0.3307±0.0023	64.067+0.026 −0.067	0.055+0.024 −0.054	95+1 −10	—
d	6.53+2.65 −3.15 M_{🜨}	0.8885+0.0060 −0.0058	278.3618±0.0003	0.063+0.027 −0.063	89.789±0.005	3.650±0.029 R_{🜨}
e	7.6+3.2 −4.6 M_{🜨}	1.1195+0.0094 −0.0110	393+3 −5	0.065+0.031 −0.065	89.801±0.003	5.19±0.04 R_{🜨}
f	25±5 M_{🜨}	1.3856+0.0094 −0.0090	542.0797±0.0001	0.052+0.025 −0.052	89.948±0.008	9.47±0.07 R_{🜨}
h (unconfirmed)	≥43+16 −13 M_{🜨}	3.94+0.41 −0.51	2,602+468 −433	0.066+0.033 −0.066	—	—
