= Kepler-279 e =

Exoplanet in Kepler-279 system

Discovery
- Discovery date: 2025
- Detection method: Transit

Orbital characteristics
- Semi-major axis: 0.439 AU
- Eccentricity: 0.0
- Orbital period (sidereal): 98.4d
- Star: Kepler-279

Physical characteristics
- Mean radius: 26,343 km
- Mass: 3.34 × 10^26 kg

Kepler-279 e is a gas giant exoplanet that orbits Kepler-279, an F-type star located at 3,383 light years from Earth, it takes 98.4 days to orbit its star. This planet is the farthest from its star in its planetary system, located at distance of 0.439 AU. It has mass of 0.1761957 Jupiter masses and radius approximately 0.36845456 of Jupiter; this planet was discovered in 2025.
