= TOI-1117 =

Multiplanetary G-type star in the constellation of Pavo

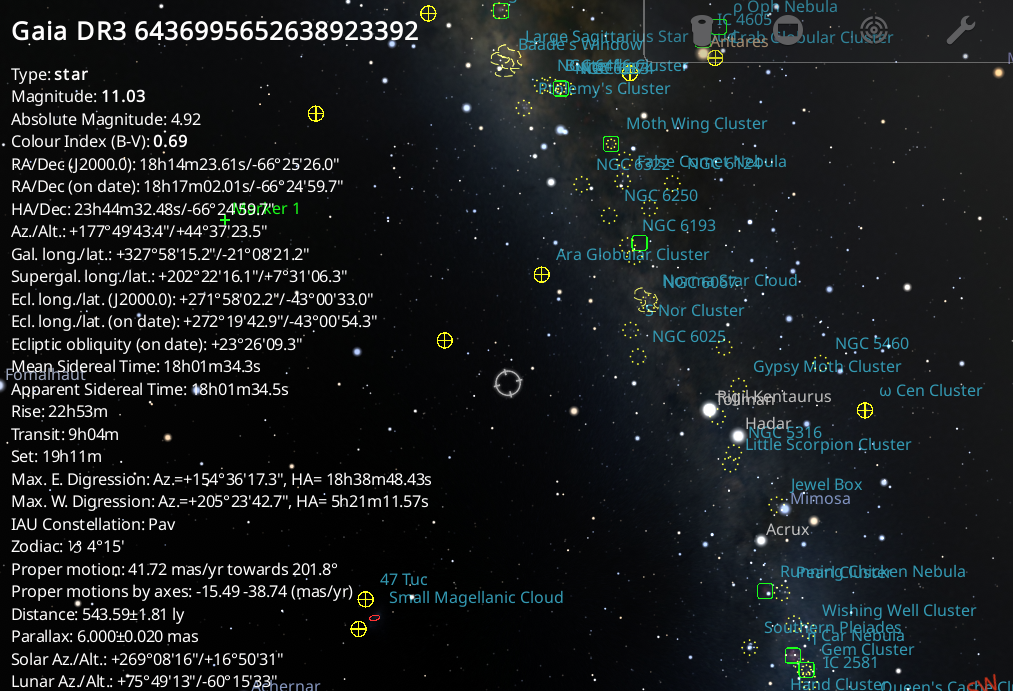
- The location of TOI-1117 in the sky, the star is located in the white circle.

Observation data Epoch J2000 Equinox J2000
- Constellation: Pavo
- Right ascension: 18^{h} 14^{m} 24.534^{s}
- Declination: −66° 25′ 11.31″
- Apparent magnitude (V): 11.016

Characteristics
- Evolutionary stage: main sequence

Astrometry
Radial velocity (R_{v})	−24.73±0.24 km/s
Proper motion (μ)	RA: −15.491 mas/yr Dec.: −38.741 mas/yr
Parallax (π)	5.9951±0.0154 mas
Distance	544 ± 1 ly (166.8 ± 0.4 pc)

Details
Mass	0.97±0.02 M_{☉}
Radius	1.05±0.03 R_{☉}
Luminosity	0.363 L_{☉}
Surface gravity (log g)	4.41±0.03 cgs
Temperature	5635±62 K
Metallicity [Fe/H]	+0.136±0.044 dex
Rotation	40 days
Rotational velocity (v sin i)	1.32±0.04 km/s
Age	4.42±1.50 Gyr

Other designations
- TOI-1117, TIC 295541511, 2MASS J18142452-6625113

Database references
SIMBAD	data
Exoplanet Archive	data

TOI-1117 is a single G-type star in the constellation of Pavo. It has approximately 0.97 times the mass and 1.05 times the radius of the Sun, with a surface temperature of 5,635±62 K and a spectral type of G7. TOI-1117 is too faint to be visible to the naked eye. Based upon parallax measurements, it is located 544 light-years (166.8 parsecs) from the Sun. The object is drifting towards the Sun with a radial velocity of −24.73 km/s.

== Planetary system ==
In June of 2025, three exoplanets (b, c and d) were identified via the radial velocity method. An additional planet was discovered using the transit technique.

None of these planets orbit in the habitable zone; all are believed to be sub-Neptune planets.

The TOI-1117 planetary system
Companion (in order from star)	Mass	Semimajor axis (AU)	Orbital period (days)	Eccentricity	Inclination	Radius
b	8.90+0.95 −0.96 M_{🜨}	0.0330±0.0002	2.22816±0.00001	0	—	2.46+0.13 −0.12 R_{🜨}
c	8.78+1.19 −1.21 M_{🜨}	0.0534±0.0003	4.579±0.004	0	—	—
d	10.71+1.59 −1.58 M_{🜨}	0.0817±0.0006	8.665±0.011	0	—	—

== See also ==
- List of exoplanets discovered in 2025
- Exoplanet
- sub-Neptune
- Main Sequence Star
