= HD 85426 c =

Neptunian exoplanet in the constellation Leo Minor

Discovery
- Discovered by: F. Lienhard
- Discovery date: 2025
- Detection method: Radial velocity

Orbital characteristics
- Semi-major axis: 0.212 AU
- Eccentricity: 0.06
- Orbital period (sidereal): 35.73 d
- Star: HD 85426

Physical characteristics
- Mass: 10.3 M_{🜨}

HD 85426 c is a Neptunian exoplanet, discovered in 2025, orbiting the G-type star HD 85426 (also known as TOI-1774) in the constellation Leo Minor. It is located about 176 light-years from Earth.

The planet completes a full orbit around its star in approximately 35.73 Earth days at an average distance of about 0.212 AU.

HD 85426 c as a mass of approximately 10.3 M_{🜨} and the equilibrium surface temperature is estimated to be 640 ± 9 K, or about 367 °C.
