= TOI-4507 b =

Exoplanet discovered in 2025

Discovery
- Discovery date: October 2025

Orbital characteristics
- Orbital period (sidereal): 104 days

Physical characteristics
- Mass: 0.094

TOI-4507 b is an exoplanet discovered in October 2025 that is roughly 578 light-years away. It is a similar size to Jupiter; however, it is roughly 30 times the mass of Earth. TOI-4507 b is notable as it challenges current models of planetary formation, and has a unique nearly polar orbit pattern around its F-type star.
