= TOI-6478 b =

Neptune-like exoplanet

TOI-6478b
Discovery
- Discovery date: 11 April 2025
- Detection method: Transit

Orbital characteristics
- Semi-major axis: 0.1136 AU
- Eccentricity: 0.0
- Orbital period (sidereal): 34.005019 d
- Inclination: 89.898
- Star: TOI-6478

Physical characteristics
- Mean radius: 4.6 R_{🜨}
- Mass: 9.9 M_{🜨}
- Temperature: 204.4 K

TOI-6478b is a cold under-dense Neptune-like exoplanet that orbits around TOI-6478, a M-type main sequence star located 126 light years from Earth in the constellation of Hydra. It has a mass of 9.9 Earth masses and a radius of 4.6 Earth radii. The planet orbital period is 34.005019 days.
