= TOI-2267 =

Binary star in the constellation Cepheus

Observation data Epoch J2000 Equinox J2000
- Constellation: Cepheus
- Right ascension: 04^{h} 20^{m} 12.64355^{s}
- Declination: +84° 54′ 06.2765″
- Apparent magnitude (V): 15.41

Characteristics
- Evolutionary stage: main sequence + main sequence
- Spectral type: M5V+M6V

Astrometry
Radial velocity (R_{v})	−19.0±0.3 km/s
Proper motion (μ)	RA: +182.388 mas/yr Dec.: −213.503 mas/yr
Parallax (π)	44.3496±0.3556 mas
Distance	73.5 ± 0.6 ly (22.5 ± 0.2 pc)

Position (relative to A)
Component	B
Epoch of observation	9 December 2021
Angular distance	0.384″
Position angle	279.7°
Projected separation	8 AU

Details

A
Mass	0.1710±0.0079 M_{☉}
Radius	0.2075±0.0225 R_{☉}
Luminosity	0.0033±0.0003 L_{☉}
Surface gravity (log g)	4.99±0.05 cgs
Temperature	3030±100 K
Metallicity [Fe/H]	0.164±0.11 dex
Rotation	0.6958 days
Age	≳1 Gyr

B
Mass	0.0989±0.0130 M_{☉}
Radius	0.130±0.030 R_{☉}
Luminosity	0.0011±0.0003 L_{☉}
Surface gravity (log g)	5.28±0.18 cgs
Temperature	2930±160 K
Metallicity [Fe/H]	0.164±0.11 dex
Rotation	0.4936 days
Age	≳1 Gyr

Other designations
- G 222-3, LP 4-80, LSPM J0420+8454, NLTT 12645, TOI-2267, TIC 459837008

Database references
SIMBAD	data
Exoplanet Archive	data

TOI-2267 is a binary star located 73.5 light-years (22.5 parsecs) away from the Sun. The system has a visual apparent magnitude of 15.4, too faint to be seen with the naked eye. It consists of two red dwarfs that are separated by only 8 AU.

== Planetary system ==
The star system hosts three confirmed Earth-sized planets, but it is not known which star each planet orbits. Two of the planets have similar orbital periods, so it is unlikely that all three planets orbit the same star, which would make TOI-2267 the second system known to host transiting planets around both stars. (Note: The previously known Kepler-132 system is a similar case; it is unknown which star each planet orbits, but they cannot all orbit the same star since two of them have almost the same period.) This configuration of planets might give more insights into studying the formation and evolution of planets in compact binary star systems. Alternatively, the planets may all orbit the same star in a very compact resonant configuration, which would make TOI-2267 the most compact exoplanetary system known.

The discovery of the planets was announced in 2025, using data from TESS as well as ground-based telescopes. Initially only two planets could be confirmed, and the third remained a candidate. A follow-up study a few months later confirmed the third planet.

The TOI-2267 A planetary system (Note: The parameters of the planets if they orbit the primary star.)
Companion (in order from star)	Mass	Semimajor axis (AU)	Orbital period (days)	Eccentricity	Inclination	Radius
d	—	0.0174±0.0003	2.0344678(23)	—	87.4±0.6°	0.98±0.09 R_{🜨}
b	—	0.0205±0.0025	2.2890900(12)	—	90.35+0.85 −1.2°	1.00±0.11 R_{🜨}
c	—	0.0263+0.0040 −0.0036	3.4950412(22)	—	89.66+1.6 −0.89°	1.14±0.13 R_{🜨}

The TOI-2267 B planetary system (Note: The parameters of the planets if they orbit the secondary star.)
Companion (in order from star)	Mass	Semimajor axis (AU)	Orbital period (days)	Eccentricity	Inclination	Radius
d	—	0.0145+0.0006 −0.0007	2.0344671(23)	—	89.0+0.6 −0.7°	1.77±0.43 R_{🜨}
b	—	0.0127±0.0032	2.2890896(17)	—	90.0±1.0°	1.22±0.29 R_{🜨}
c	—	0.0145+0.0045 −0.0037	3.4950404(28)	—	89.2+2.4 −1.1°	1.36±0.33 R_{🜨}
