= HD 101581 =

Star in the constellation Centaurus

Observation data Epoch J2000 Equinox ICRS
- Constellation: Centaurus
- Right ascension: 11^{h} 41^{m} 02.46847^{s}
- Declination: −44° 24′ 18.6867″
- Apparent magnitude (V): 7.762

Characteristics
- Evolutionary stage: main sequence
- Spectral type: K4.5Vk:

Astrometry
Radial velocity (R_{v})	13.55±0.13 km/s
Proper motion (μ)	RA: −660.634 mas/yr Dec.: 242.096 mas/yr
Parallax (π)	78.2268±0.0182 mas
Distance	41.694 ± 0.010 ly (12.783 ± 0.003 pc)
Absolute magnitude (M_{V})	+7.30

Details
Mass	0.653±0.028 M_{☉}
Radius	0.630±0.027 R_{☉}
Luminosity (bolometric)	0.18332±0.00059 L_{☉}
Surface gravity (log g)	4.654±0.057 cgs
Temperature	4675±53 K
Metallicity [Fe/H]	−0.505±0.027 dex
Rotation	~30 days
Rotational velocity (v sin i)	2.47±0.30 km/s
Age	6.88±4.27 Gyr

Other designations
- CD−43 7228, GJ 435, HD 101581, HIP 56998, SAO 222956, LHS 2441, TOI-6276, TIC 397362481

Database references
SIMBAD	data
Exoplanet Archive	data
ARICNS	data

HD 101581 (TOI-6276, Gliese 435) is a nearby K-type main-sequence star located in the constellation Centaurus, approximately 41.7 light-years (12.8 parsecs) away, based on a parallax of 78.227 mas. At an apparent magnitude of 7.8, it is too faint to be seen with the naked eye, although it can be viewed with a small telescope.

HD 101581 has a spectral type of K5V, which classifies it as a main sequence star (similar to the Sun) having the core hydrogen converted into helium. It has 0.65 times the Solar mass and 0.63 times the Solar radius while its age is estimated to be about 6.9 billion years old. Its surface has an effective temperature of 4633 K giving it the typical orange hue of a K-type star. The metallicity index of it is −0.344±0.059, indicating an iron-to-hydrogen ratio 45% that of the Sun.

== Planetary system ==
In 2024, two validated Earth-size planets orbiting HD 101581 were discovered via the transit method by TESS. These planets have orbital periods of 4.5 and 6.2 days, respectively. A candidate third small transiting planet in a wider orbit was possibly detected. The host star is the brightest star (in visual magnitude) with multiple known transiting Earth-size exoplanets, which should enable the atmospheric study of its orbiting planets via transmission spectroscopy in the near-future.

The HD 101581 planetary system
Companion (in order from star)	Mass	Semimajor axis (AU)	Orbital period (days)	Eccentricity	Inclination (°)	Radius
b	—	0.046±0.0007	4.46569+0.00029 −0.00032	—	87.78+0.27 −0.2	0.956+0.061 −0.063 R_{🜨}
c	—	0.0573±0.0009	6.20401+0.00054 −0.00044	—	87.93+0.19 −0.15	0.990±0.070 R_{🜨}
(unconfirmed)	—	0.0671±0.001	7.8708+0.0016 −0.0011	—	87.88+0.15 −0.14°	0.982+0.114 −0.098 R_{🜨}

== See also ==
- K2-138, which has a similar architecture "peas-in-pod" of planetary system
- LTT 1445, another nearby star system with transiting Earth-size planets
- Gliese 436
