= HD 87816 =

Star in the constellation Vela

- Location of HD 87816 (circled)

Observation data Epoch J2000 Equinox ICRS
- Constellation: Vela
- Right ascension: 10^{h} 06^{m} 07.21043^{s}
- Declination: −52° 11′ 16.5788″
- Apparent magnitude (V): 6.499±0.009

Characteristics
- Evolutionary stage: Red clump
- Spectral type: K1III
- B−V color index: 0.986

Astrometry
Radial velocity (R_{v})	4.7±0.4 km/s
Proper motion (μ)	RA: −55.682 mas/yr Dec.: +16.413 mas/yr
Parallax (π)	7.4825±0.0196 mas
Distance	436 ± 1 ly (133.6 ± 0.4 pc)
Absolute magnitude (M_{V})	+0.876±0.013

Details
Mass	2.41±0.10 M_{☉}
Radius	9.0±0.2 R_{☉}
Luminosity	45±1 L_{☉}
Surface gravity (log g)	2.860±0.096 cgs
Temperature	4,989±46 K
Metallicity [Fe/H]	+0.139±0.035 dex

Other designations
- R Vel (obsolete), CD−51°4471, HD 87816, HIP 49477, HR 3978, TYC 8194-294-1

Database references
SIMBAD	data

HD 87816 is a star in the constellation Vela. With an apparent magnitude of 6.499, it is very close to the average threshold for naked eye visibility, and can only be viewed from sufficiently dark skies, far from light pollution. Based on parallax measurements, it lies at a distance of 436 light-years. It is moving away from the Solar System at a velocity of 4.7 km/s.

The spectrum of this star matches a spectral class of K1III, with the luminosity class III indicating it is a giant star that has exhausted the hydrogen at its core. It is now fusing helium, being in the evolutionary stage known as the horizontal branch. The star has 2.4 times the Sun's mass, having grown to a radius 9.0 times the radius of the Sun. It shines with 45 times the Sun's luminosity at an effective temperature of 4,989 K. The temperature gives it the orange hue typical of K-type stars.

HD 87816 was once believed to be a variable star and received the variable-star designation R Velorum, but it is now considered a constant star.

== Planetary system ==
HD 87816 hosts two known exoplanets, discovered in 2025 via Doppler spectroscopy. Both are gas giants, like Jupiter and Saturn.

Planet b has a minimum mass of 6.7 Jupiter masses (M_{J}). It takes 484 days (1.33 years) to complete an orbit around HD 87816 and has a very high orbital eccentricity of 0.78, among the highest of exoplanets orbiting giant stars.

Planet c has a minimum mass of 12.2 Jupiter masses. It takes 7,600 days (21 years) to complete an orbit around its host, and has a low eccentricity of 0.11.

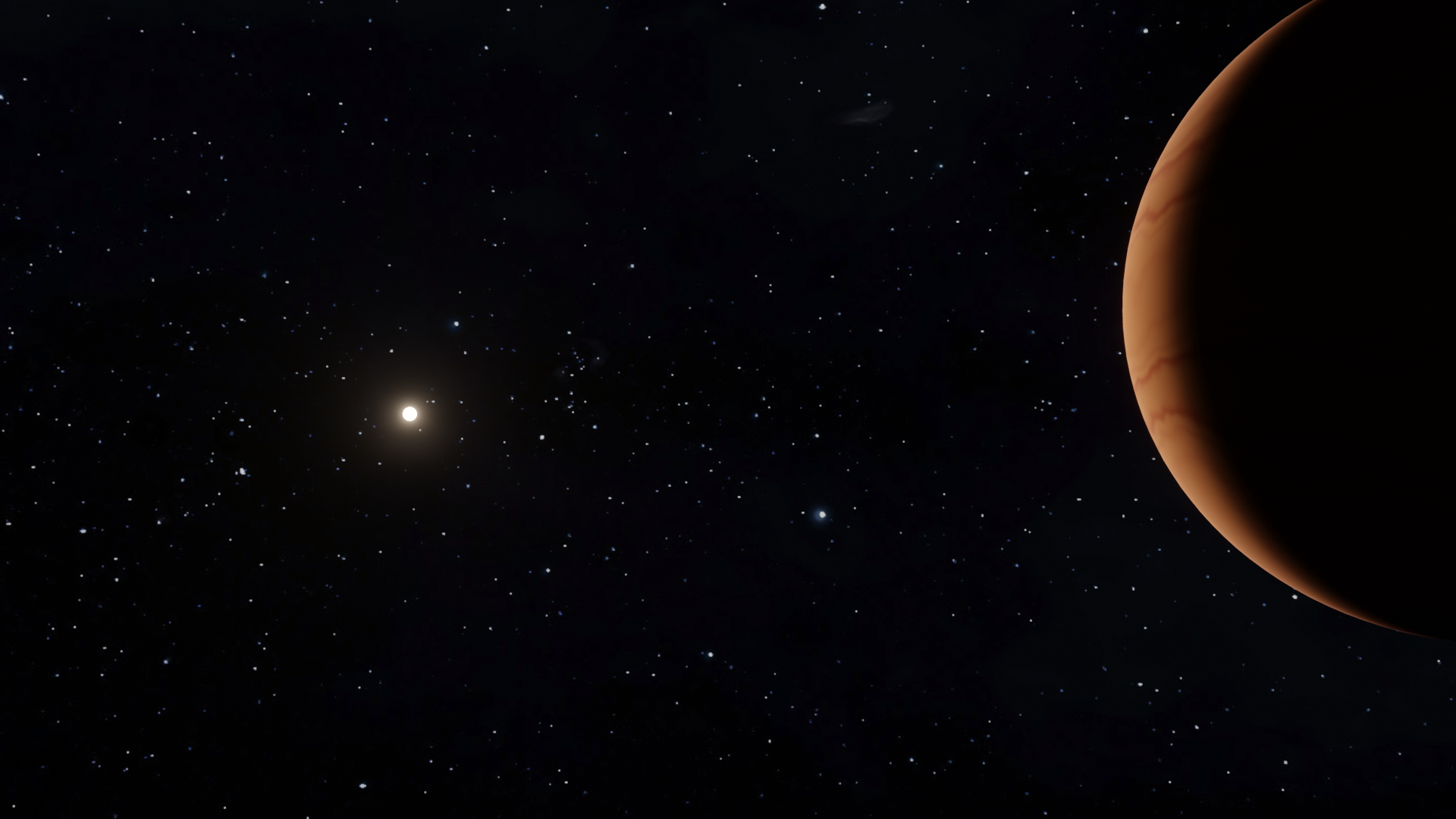
Artist's impression of HD 87816 viewed from its outer planet.

The HD 87816 planetary system
Companion (in order from star)	Mass	Semimajor axis (AU)	Orbital period (years)	Eccentricity	Inclination (°)	Radius
b	≥6.74±0.13 M_{J}	1.618±0.0003	1.3256+0.00036 −0.00033	0.780±0.005	—	—
c	≥12.20+2.15 −1.59 M_{J}	10.14+0.99 −0.48	20.80+3.1 −1.46	0.19±0.07	—	—
