= KMTNet =

South Korean optical telescope network

Korea Microlensing Telescope Network
- Alternative names: Korea Microlensing Telescope Network
- Organization: Korea Astronomy and Space Science Institute
- Wavelength: Optical/Infrared
- Built: 2015
- Diameter: 1.6 m (5 ft 3 in)
- Angular resolution: 0.37 arcsec
- Focal length: 5.16 m (16.9 ft)
- Website: https://kmtnet.kasi.re.kr/~ulens/

The Korea Microlensing Telescope Network (KMTNet; Korean: 외계행성 탐색시스템) is an ongoing wide-field photometric system that aims to discover extrasolar planets using gravitational microlensing. The system leverages three identical 1.6 m wide-field optical telescopes located at the Cerro-Tololo Inter-American Observatory (CTIO) in Chile, the South African Astronomical Observatory (SAAO) in South Africa, and the Siding Spring Observatory (SSO) in Australia. All three telescopes share a latitude of −30 degrees enabling continuous monitoring of the galactic bulge during 8 months of each year and other targets in the south hemisphere during non-bulge season such as near-earth asteroids and supernovae. Currently, 232 microlensing planets have been described by KMTNet. The KMTNet survey was recently used to show that super-earths are common in Jupiter-like orbits.
