= List of multiplanetary systems =

Number of extrasolar planet discoveries per year through 2023. Colors indicate method of detection. Direct imaging Gravitational microlensing Pulsar timing Radial velocity Transit photometry

From the total of 4,809 stars known to have exoplanets (as of 23 April 2026), there are a total of 1,061 known multiplanetary systems, or stars with at least two confirmed planets, beyond the Solar System. This list includes systems with at least three confirmed planets, or two confirmed planets where additional candidates have been proposed. The stars with the most confirmed planets are the Sun (the Solar System's star) and Kepler-90, with eight confirmed planets each, followed by TRAPPIST-1 with seven planets.

The multiplanetary systems are listed below according to the star's distance from Earth. Proxima Centauri, the closest star to the Solar System, has at least two planets (the confirmed b, d and the disputed c). The nearest system with four or more confirmed planets is Barnard Star, with four known. The farthest confirmed system with two or more planets is OGLE-2012-BLG-0026L, at 13,300 light-years (4,100 pc) away.

The table below contains information about the coordinates, spectral and physical properties, and the number of confirmed (unconfirmed) planets for systems with at least two planets and one not confirmed. The two most important stellar properties are mass and metallicity because they determine how these planetary systems form. Systems with higher mass and metallicity tend to have more planets and more massive planets. However, although low metallicity stars tend to have fewer massive planets, particularly hot-Jupiters, they also tend to have a larger number of close-in planets, orbiting at less than one AU.

== Multiplanetary systems ==
Color indicates number of planets
2 (x)	3	4	5	6	7	8

Star	Constellation	Right ascension	Declination	Apparent magnitude	Distance (ly)	Spectral type	Mass (M_{☉})	Temperature (K)	Age (Gyr)	Confirmed (unconfirmed) planets	Notes
Sun	N/A	N/A	N/A	−26.74	0.000016	G2V	1	5778	4.572	8	Has 8 confirmed major planets, possibly 9 Dwarf Planets, 19 Planetary-mass moons and hypothetical Planet Nine. Only known system to have life.
Proxima Centauri	Centaurus	14^{h} 29^{m} 42.94853^{s}	−62° 40′ 46.1631″	10.43 to 11.11	4.244	M5.5Ve	0.122	3042	4.85	2 (1)	Closest star to the Sun and closest star to the Sun with a multiplanetary system. Planet b is potentially habitable. Planet c is not confirmed.
Barnard's Star	Ophiuchus	17^{h} 57^{m} 48.4985^{s}	+04° 41′ 36.1139″	9.511	5.96	M4.0V	0.162	3195	10	4	Closest single star to the Sun with a confirmed multiplanetary system.
Lalande 21185	Ursa Major	11^{h} 03^{m} 20.1940^{s}	+35° 58′ 11.5682″	7.520	8.3044±0.0007	M2V	0.39	3601±51	8.047	2 (1)	Brightest red dwarf star in the northern celestial hemisphere.
Gliese 887	Piscis Austrinus	23^{h} 05^{m} 52.04^{s}	−35° 51′ 11.05″	7.34	10.721	M0.5V	0.486	3688±86	4.57	4 (1)	Star also known as Lacaille 9352. Planet d is potentially habitable.
Luyten's Star	Canis Minor	07^{h} 27^{m} 24.4991^{s}	+05° 13′ 32.827″	9.872	11.20	M3.5V	0.26	3150	unknown	2 (2)	Stellar activity level and rotational rate suggest an age higher than 8 billion years. Planet b is potentially habitable.
YZ Ceti	Cetus	01^{h} 12^{m} 30.64^{s}	−16° 59′ 56.3″	12.07	11.74	M4.5V	0.13	3056	4	3	A red dwarf flare star.
GJ 1061	Horologium	03^{h} 35^{m} 59.69^{s}	−44° 30′ 45.3″	13.03	12.04	M5.5V	0.113	2953	unknown	3	Planet d is potentially habitable.
Teegarden's Star	Aries	02^{h} 53^{m} 00.89^{s}	+16° 52′ 53″	15.13	12.497	M7V	0.097	3034	8	3	Teegarden's Star c is likely an Earth-mass planet that orbits in the habitable zone.
Wolf 1061	Ophiuchus	16^{h} 30^{m} 18.0584^{s}	−12° 39′ 45.325″	10.07	14.050 ± 0.002	M3.5V	0.294	3342	unknown	3	Planet c may not be habitable.
Gliese 876	Aquarius	22^{h} 53^{m} 16.73^{s}	−14° 15′ 49.3″	10.17	15.25	M4V	0.334	3348	4.893	4	Planet b is a gas giant which orbits in the habitable zone.
82 Eridani	Eridanus	03^{h} 19^{m} 55.65^{s}	−43° 04′ 11.2″	4.254	19.71	G8V	0.7	5401	5.76	3 (3)	This star also has a dust disk. with a semi-major axis at approximately 19 AU. This Star can be also be named HD 20794. Planet f moves in and out of the Habitable zone
Gliese 581	Libra	15^{h} 19^{m} 26.83^{s}	−07° 43′ 20.2″	10.56	20.56	M3V	0.311	3484	4.326	3 (1)	Planet d is disputed. If confirmed, it would be potentially habitable.
Gliese 667 C	Scorpius	17^{h} 18^{m} 57.16^{s}	−34° 59′ 23.14″	10.20	21	M1.5V	0.31	3700	2	5 (1)	Triple star system - all exoplanets orbit around Star C. Planet c is potentially habitable, There were thought to be up to 5 more planets orbiting the star, Gliese 667 Cd, Ce, Cf, Cg, and Ch, but some of them were false positives except for planets e, f, and g, but planet d remains unconfirmed.
HD 219134	Cassiopeia	23^{h} 13^{m} 14.74^{s}	+57° 10′ 03.5″	5.57	21	K3Vvar	0.794	4699	12.66	6 (1)	Closest star to the Sun with exactly six confirmed exoplanets. exoplanets, and closest K-type main sequence star to the Sun with a multiplanetary system. One of the oldest stars with a multiplanetary system, although it is still more metal-rich than the Sun. None of the known planets is in the habitable zone.
61 Virginis	Virgo	13^{h} 18^{m} 24.31^{s}	−18° 18′ 40.3″	4.74	28	G5V	0.954	5531	8.96	3	61 Virginis also has a debris disk. All planets in the system are gas giants.
Gliese 433	Hydra	11^{h} 35^{m} 26.9485^{s}	−25° 10′ 08.9″	9.79	29.8±0.1	M1.5V	0.48	3550±100	unknown	3	An infrared excess around this star suggests a circumstellar disk. Planet d is potentially habitable.
Gliese 367	Vela	09^{h} 44^{m} 29.15^{s}	−45° 46′ 44.46″	10.153	30.719	M1.0V	0.454	3522	7.95	3	Planet d is may not be habitable.
Gliese 357	Hydra	09^{h} 36^{m} 01.6373^{s}	−21° 39′ 38.878″	10.906	30.776	M2.5V	0.362	3488	unknown	3	Planet d is a potentially habitable gas giant.
AU Microscopii	Microscopium	20^{h} 45^{m} 09.87^{s}	−31° 20′ 32.82″	8.627	31.683	M1Ve	0.6	3665	0.019	2 (2)	Planet b potentially has rings. Planet b is also being blasted away.
L 98-59	Volans	08^{h} 18^{m} 07.62^{s}	−68° 18′ 46.8″	11.69	34.6	M3V	0.312	3412	unknown	5 (1)	The unconfirmed planet g orbits in closer than b. Planet f may not be habitable.
Gliese 806	Cygnus	20^{h} 45^{m} 04.099^{s}	+44° 29′ 56.6″	10.79	39.3	M1.5V	0.423	3586	3	2 (1)	Planet b is a Super-Earth.
TRAPPIST-1	Aquarius	23^{h} 06^{m} 29.283^{s}	−05° 02′ 28.59″	18.80	39.5	M8V	0.089	2550	7.6	7 (1)	Planets e, f and g are potentially habitable. Only star known with exactly seven confirmed planets. All seven confirmed terrestrial planets lie within only 0.07 AU of the star. Planet i is speculated, but it has not been confirmed.
55 Cancri	Cancer	08^{h} 52^{m} 35.8111^{s} & 08^{h} 52^{m} 40.8627^{s}	+28° 19′ 50.955″ & +28° 19′ 58.821″	5.95+13.15	41.05+40.95	K0IV-V+M4.5V	1.169	5172+3320	8.6	6 (2)	At least 4 planets orbit around the primary, and 2 planets around the secondary star. Planets Ad and Ag are unconfirmed. Planet Bc is potentially habitable. Star A has a mass of 0.905 while B has a mass of 0.264.
Gliese 180	Eridanus	04^{h} 53^{m} 49.9798^{s}	−17° 46′ 24.294″	10.894	40.3	M2V or M3V	0.39	3562	unknown	3	The habitability of planet c is disputed.
HD 69830	Puppis	08^{h} 18^{m} 23.95^{s}	−12° 37′ 55.8″	5.95	41	K0V	0.856	5385	7.446	3	A debris disk exterior to the three exoplanets was detected by the Spitzer Space Telescope in 2005.
HD 101581	Centaurus	11^{h} 41^{m} 01.51^{s}	−44° 24′ 14.93″	7.762	41.7	K4.5V	0.653	4675	6.88	2 (1)	This star can also be called HIP 56998.
HD 40307	Pictor	05^{h} 54^{m} 04.24^{s}	−60° 01′ 24.5″	7.17	42	K2.5V	0.752	4977	1.198	4 (2)	The existence of planets e and g are disputed. If confirmed, planet g is potentially habitable.
Upsilon Andromedae	Andromeda	01^{h} 36^{m} 47.84^{s}	+41° 24′ 19.7″	4.09	44	F8V	1.27	6107	3.781	3 (1)	Nearest F-type main-sequence star with a multiplanetary system. Brightest star in the night sky with at least three planets. All exoplanets orbit around star A in the binary system. The existence of planet e is disputed. Planet d is potentially habitable.
47 Ursae Majoris	Ursa Major	10^{h} 59^{m} 27.97^{s}	+40° 25′ 48.9″	5.10	46	G0V	1.029	5892	7.434	3	Planet Taphao Thong was discovered in 1996 and was one of the first exoplanets to be discovered. The planet was the first long-period extrasolar planet discovered. The other planets were discovered later.
Nu^{2} Lupi	Lupus	15^{h} 21^{m} 49.57^{s}	−48° 19′ 01.1″	5.65	47	G2V	0.906	5664	10.36	3	One of the oldest stars in the solar neighbourhood.
Gliese 163	Dorado	04^{h} 09^{m} 16^{s}	−53° 22′ 25″	11.8	49	M3.5V	0.4	unknown	3	5	Planet c is possibly habitable.
Mu Arae	Ara	17^{h} 44^{m} 08.70^{s}	−51° 50′ 02.6″	5.15	51	G3IV-V	1.077	5704	6.413	4	Planet Quijote orbits in the circumstellar habitable zone. However, it is a gas giant, so it itself is uninhabitable although a large moon orbiting around it may be habitable.
GJ 3929	Corona Borealis	15^{h} 58^{m} 18.8^{s}	+35° 24′ 24.3″	12.67	51.58	M3.5V	0.313	3384	unknown	2 (1)	
Gliese 676 A	Ara	17^{h} 30^{m} 11.2042^{s}	−51° 38′ 13.116″	9.59	53	M0V	0.71	unknown	unknown	4	Held the record for widest range of masses in a planetary system in 2012.
HD 48948	Lynx	06^{h} 49^{m} 57.55^{s}	+60° 20′ 14.33″	8.58	54.91	K3V	0.686	4593	11.48	3	
HD 7924	Cassiopeia	01^{h} 21^{m} 59.12^{s}	+76° 42′ 37.0″	7.19	55	K0V	0.832	5177	unknown	3	
Rho Coronae Borealis	Corona Borealis	16^{h} 01^{m} 02.42^{s}	+33° 18′ 00.67″	5.39	57.11	G0V	0.95	5817	10.2	3	
HD 153557	Hercules	16^{h} 57^{m} 52.96^{s}	+47° 22′ 04.28″	7.83	58.52	K3V	0.79	4837	unknown	3	
Pi Mensae	Mensa	05^{h} 37^{m} 09.8851^{s}	−80° 28′ 08.8313″	5.65	59.62±0.07	G0V	1.11	6013	3.4	3	Outer planet is likely a brown dwarf.
GJ 3293	Eridanus	04^{h} 28^{m} 35.72^{s}	−25° 10′ 08.9″	11.96	59	M2.5V	0.42	3466±49	unknown	4	Planets b and d orbit in the habitable zone.
GJ 3998	Ophiuchus	17^{h} 16^{m} 00.49^{s}	+11° 03′ 22.23″	10.83	59.28	M1V	0.52	3726	unknown	3	
LHS 1678	Caelum	04^{h} 32^{m} 43^{s}	−39° 47′ 21″	12	64.8	M2V	0.345	3490	unknown	3	
HD 104067	Corvus	11^{h} 59^{m} 10.0^{s}	−20° 21′ 13.6″	7.92	66.3	K3V	0.82	4942	4.8	2 (1)	The innermost planet, which is unconfirmed, might suffer from significant tidal heating.
TOI-5789	Sagitta	20^{h} 11^{m} 06.07^{s}	+16° 11′ 16.79″	7.30	66.7	K1V	0.821	5185	9.4	4	Star also known as HIP 99452. The system has a wide companion M-dwarf.
HD 142	Phoenix	00^{h} 06^{m} 19.0^{s}	−49° 04′ 30″	5.70	67	G1 IV	1.1	6180	5.93	3	-
HD 215152	Aquarius	22^{h} 43^{m} 21^{s}	−06° 24′ 03″	8.13	70	G8IV	1.019	5646	7.32	4	A debris disk candidate as it has an infrared excess.
HD 164922	Hercules	18^{h} 02^{m} 30.86^{s}	+26° 18′ 46.8″	7.01	72	G9V	0.874	5293	13.4	4	Oldest star with a multiplanetary system. Despite its age, it is more metal-rich than the Sun.
HD 63433	Gemini	07^{h} 49^{m} 55.0^{s}	+27° 21′ 47.4″	6.92	73	G5V	0.99	5640	0.4	3	
GJ 3090	Phoenix	01^{h} 21^{m} 45.39^{s}	−46° 42′ 51.76″	11.403	73.24	M2	0.519	3707	1.02	2 (1)	-
TOI-270	Pictor	04^{h} 33^{m} 39.86^{s}	−51° 57′ 26.62″	12.603	73.3	M3V	0.386	3506	unknown	3	
TOI-2267	Cepheus	4^{h} 20^{m} 12.6^{s}	+84° 54′ 6.3″	15.4	73.5	M5V+M6V	0.27	3030+2930	unknown	3	One of the few planetary systems to possibly have both stars having planets around them. TOI-2267 b, c orbit one star and the planet d likely orbits the remaining star.
HD 96700	Hydra	11^{h} 07^{m} 53.82^{s}	−30° 10′ 30.50″	6.51	82.8	G0V	1	5845	6.8	3	-
HIP 57274	Ursa Major	11^{h} 44^{m} 41^{s}	+30° 57′ 33″	8.96	85	K5V	0.73	4640	7.87	3	-
HD 39194	Mensa	05^{h} 44^{m} 32^{s}	−70° 08′ 37″	8.08	86.2	K0V	unknown	5205	unknown	3	The planets have eccentric orbits.
LP 791-18	Crater	11^{h} 02^{m} 45.95^{s}	−16° 24′ 22.3″	16.9	86.9	M6V/M7V	0.139	2960	0.5	3	planet d could be volcanically active because its elliptical orbit is periodically stretched and squeezed by the gravitational pull of a larger neighboring planet, LP 791-18 c.
HD 181433	Pavo	19^{h} 25^{m} 09.57^{s}	−66° 28′ 07.7″	8.38	87	K5V	0.777	4962	8.974	3	-
HD 134606	Apus	15^{h} 15^{m} 15^{s}	−70° 31′ 11″	6.85	87	G6IV	unknown	unknown	unknown	5	The planets have moderately eccentric orbits.
HD 158259	Draco	17^{h} 25^{m} 24.0^{s}	+52° 47′ 26″	6.46	89	G0	1.08	unknown	unknown	5 (1)	A G-type star slightly more massive than the Sun. Planet g remains unconfirmed.
HD 82943	Hydra	09^{h} 34^{m} 50.74^{s}	−12° 07′ 46.4″	6.54	90	F9V Fe+0.5	1.175	5874	3.08	2 (1)	Planets b and c are in a 2:1 orbital resonance. Planet b orbits in the habitable zone, but it and planet c are massive enough to be brown dwarfs. HD 82943 has an unusual lithium-6 abundance.
HD 176986	Aquila	19^{h} 03^{m} 05.872^{s}	−11° 02′ 38.131″	8.45	90.93	K2.5V	0.789	4931	4.3	3	
GJ 3138	Cetus	02^{h} 09^{m} 10.90^{s}	−16° 20′ 22.53″	10.877	92.9		0.681	3717±49	unknown	3	
GJ 9827	Pisces	23^{h} 27^{m} 04.84^{s}	−01° 17′ 10.59″	10.10	96.8±0.2	K6V	0.593	4294±52	unknown	3	Also known as K2-135. Planet d is the first confirmed steam world.
HD 50554	Gemini	06^{h} 54^{m} 42.7^{s}	+24° 14′ 42.51″	6.84	101.34	F8V	1.04	5968	2.16	3	The system also has an outer debris disk, hinting at a possible additional planet along its inner edge.
K2-239	Sextans	10^{h} 42^{m} 22.63^{s}	+04° 26′ 28.86″	14.5	101.5	M3V	0.4	3420	unknown	3	
TOI-700	Dorado	06^{h} 28^{m} 22.97^{s}	−65° 34′ 43.01″	13.10	101.61	M2V	0.416	3480	1.5	4	Planet d is potentially habitable.
HR 858	Fornax	02^{h} 51^{m} 56.16^{s}	−30° 48′ 53.2″	6.38	105	F6V	1.145	6201	unknown	3	The star forms a binary with a red dwarf.
HD 110067	Coma Berenices	12^{h} 39^{m} 21.41^{s}	+20° 01′ 38.42″	8.43	105.1	K0V	0.798	5266	8.1	6	
TOI-431	Lepus	05^{h} 33^{m} 04.62^{s}	−26° 43′ 25.93″	9.12	106.2	K3V	0.78	4850	unknown	3	-
HD 37124	Taurus	05^{h} 37^{m} 02.49^{s}	+20° 43′ 50.8″	7.68	110	G4V	0.83	5606	3.327	3	Planet c orbits at the outer edge of the habitable zone.
HD 73344	Cancer	08^{h} 38^{m} 45.47^{s}	+23° 41′ 06.95″	6.876	114.9	F6V	1.2	6220	1.15	3	
HD 20781	Fornax	03^{h} 20^{m} 03^{s}	−28° 47′ 02″	8.44	115	G9.5V	0.7	5256±29	unknown	4	Located in binary star system. The companion star, HD 20782, also has one planet in a highly eccentric orbit.
LHS 1903	Lynx	07^{h} 11^{m} 27.94^{s}	+48° 19′ 49.40″	12.21	116.3	M0.5V	0.538	3664	7.08	4 (1)	The system has an unusual architecture with a rocky planet on the outermost orbit, exterior to two gas dwarfs. An additional planetary signal is suggested from the radial velocity measurements.
Kepler-444	Lyra	19^{h} 19^{m} 01^{s}	+41° 38′ 05″	9.0	117	K0V	0.758	5040	11.23	5	Nearest multiplanetary system where the planets were discovered by the Kepler space telescope.
TOI-1266	Draco	13^{h} 11^{m} 59.18^{s}	+65° 50′ 01.31″	12.94	117.5	M2V	0.437	3563	4.6	3	
HD 141399	Boötes	15^{h} 46^{m} 54.0^{s}	+46° 59′ 11″	7.2	118	K0V	1.07	5600	unknown	4	Planet c orbits in the habitable zone.
Kepler-42	Cygnus	19^{h} 28^{m} 53^{s}	+44° 37′ 10″	16.12	126	M5V	0.13	3068	unknown	3	Host 3 sub earths orbiting it.
HD 31527	Lepus	04^{h} 55^{m} 38^{s}	−23° 14′ 31″	7.48	126	G0V	unknown	unknown	unknown	3	-
HD 10180	Hydrus	01^{h} 37^{m} 53.58^{s}	−60° 30′ 41.5″	7.33	127	G1V	1.055	5911	4.335	6 (3)	Has 6 confirmed planets orbiting around it, Evidence for 3 more planets in the system exist, If these worlds are confirmed, this system would be the largest planetary system found.
HD 23472	Reticulum	03^{h} 41^{m} 50.3988^{s}	−62° 46′ 01.4772″	9.72	127.48	K3.5V	0.67	4684±99	unknown	5	
HR 8799	Pegasus	23^{h} 07^{m} 28.72^{s}	+21° 08′ 03.3″	5.96	129	A5V	1.472	7429	0.064	4 (1)	Only A-type main sequence star with a known multiplanetary system, and hottest and most massive single main sequence star with a multiplanetary system. All four planets are massive super-Jupiters.
TOI-2076	Boötes	14^{h} 29^{m} 34.08^{s}	+39° 47′ 25.44″	9.139	136.7	K0	0.856	5192	0.21	4	-
HD 27894	Reticulum	04^{h} 20^{m} 47.05^{s}	−59° 24′ 39.0″	9.42	138	K2V	0.8	4875	3.9	3	-
HD 93385	Vela	10^{h} 46^{m} 15.1160^{s}	−41° 27′ 51.7261″	7.486	141.6	G2V	1.07	5823	4.13	3	
HD 28471	Reticulum	04^{h} 25^{m} 09.00^{s}	−64° 04′ 43.27″	7.89	142.4	G5V	0.98	5766	6.56	3 (1)	
K2-3	Leo	11^{h} 29^{m} 20.3918^{s}	−01° 27′ 17.280″	12.168	143.9±0.4	M0V	0.601	3835±70	1	3	The outermost planet orbits in the habitable zone.
HD 34445	Orion	05^{h} 17^{m} 41.0^{s}	+07° 21′ 12″	7.31	152	G0V	1.07	5836	8.5	1 (5)	Some planets were not detected or inferred to be false positives in a later study.
HD 204313	Capricornus	21^{h} 28^{m} 12.21^{s}	−21° 43′ 34.5″	7.99	154	G5V	1.045	5767	3.38	3	-
HD 3167	Pisces	00^{h} 34^{m} 57.5^{s}	+04° 22′ 53″	8.97	154.4	K0V	0.852	5300	10.2	4	-
TOI-500	Puppis	07^{h} 06^{m} 14.18^{s}	−47° 35′ 16.14″	10.54	154.6	K6V	0.74	4440	5	4	-
HIP 34269	Puppis	07^{h} 06^{m} 13.98^{s}	−47° 35′ 13.87″	10.59	154.81		0.74	4440±100	unknown	4	
HD 11506	Cetus	01^{h} 52^{m} 50.56^{s}	−19° 30′ 26.63″	7.51	167.0	G0V	1.24	6030	2.3	3	
HD 133131	Libra	15^{h} 03^{m} 35.80651^{s}	−27° 50′ 27.5520″	8.4	168	G2V+G2V	0.95	5799±19	6	3	2 planets around primary, and 1 planet around secondary star.
K2-136	Taurus	04^{h} 29^{m} 38.99^{s}	+22° 52′ 57.80″	11.2	173	K5V	0.71	4364±70	0.7	3	
HIP 14810	Aries	03^{h} 11^{m} 14.23^{s}	+21° 05′ 50.5″	8.51	174	G5V	0.989	5485	5.271	3	-
HD 191939	Draco	20^{h} 08^{m} 05.75^{s}	+66° 51′ 2.1″	8.971	175	G9V	0.81	5348	8.7	6	
HD 85426	Leo Minor	09^{h} 52^{m} 38.86^{s}	+35° 06′ 39.63″	8.25	175.3	G4	0.991	5746	7.4	2 (1)	Also known as TOI-1774.
HD 125612	Virgo	14^{h} 20^{m} 53.51^{s}	−17° 28′ 53.5″	8.33	177	G3V	1.099	5897	2.15	3	-
TOI-712	Dorado	06^{h} 11^{m} 44.67^{s}	−65° 49′ 33.02″	10.84	191.2	K4.5V	0.732	4622	0.83	3 (1)	
TOI-880	Canis Major	06^{h} 16^{m} 39.47^{s}	−13° 59′ 14.41″	10.10	197.9	K	0.87	5050	5.2	3	
HD 184010	Vulpecula	19^{h} 31^{m} 22.0^{s}	+26° 37′ 02″	5.9	200	K0III-IV	1.35	4971	2.76	3	-
TOI-4342	Octans	21^{h} 37^{m} 32.864^{s}	−77° 58′ 43.51″	12.67	200.7	M0V	0.63	3901	unknown	2 (1)	-
HD 109271	Virgo	12^{h} 33^{m} 36.0^{s}	−11° 37′ 19″	8.05	202	G5	1.047	5783	7.3	2 (1)	-
HD 38677	Orion	05^{h} 47^{m} 06.0^{s}	−10° 37′ 49″	8.0	202	F8V	1.21	6196.0	2.01	4	Also known as DMPP-1.
HD 22946	Eridanus	03^{h} 39^{m} 16.69^{s}	−42° 45′ 46″	8.27	204.8	F7/8V	1.098	6169	2.5	3	
TOI-178	Sculptor	00^{h} 29^{m} 12.30^{s}	+30° 27′ 13.46″	11.95	205.16	K7V	0.65	4316±70	7.1	6	The planets are in an orbital resonance.
TOI-663	Sextans	10^{h} 40^{m} 15.80^{s}	−08° 30′ 39.90″	13.67	209.5	M1V	0.514	3681	unknown	3	
HD 108236	Centaurus	12^{h} 26^{m} 17.89^{s}	−51° 21′ 46.21″	9.24	211	G3V	0.97	5730	5.8	5	-
TOI-1203	Hydra	11^{h} 12^{m} 54.42^{s}	−34° 24′ 24.97″	8.59	212.0	G3V	0.886	5737	12.5	4	-
Kepler-37	Lyra	18^{h} 58^{m} 23.1^{s}	+44° 31′ 05″	9.77	215	G8V	0.803	5417	6	3 (2)	The existence of Kepler-37e is dubious. A further long-period candidate Kepler-37f was also proposed.
K2-72	Aquarius	22^{h} 18^{m} 29.2548^{s}	−09° 36′ 44.3824″	15.04	217	M2V	0.27	3497	unknown	4	2 planets in habitable zone
Kepler-138	Lyra	19^{h} 21^{m} 32.0^{s}	+43° 17′ 35″	13.5	218.5	M1V	0.57	3871	2.3	3 (1)	Planet b is one of the smallest exoplanets known, planets c and d are the first confirmed exoplanets that are likely mostly water.
K2-233	Libra	15^{h} 21^{m} 55.2^{s}	−20° 13′ 54″	10.0	221	K3	0.8	4950	0.36	3	
HIP 29442	Lepus	06^{h} 12^{m} 13.88^{s}	−14° 38′ 57.54″	9.49	222.4	K0V	0.901	5289	11.2	3	
TOI-1260	Ursa Major	10^{h} 28^{m} 35.03^{s}	+65° 51′ 16.38″	11.973	239.5		0.66	4227±85	6.7	3	
LP 358-499	Taurus	04^{h} 40^{m} 35.64^{s}	+25° 00′ 36.05″	13.996	245.3		0.46	3655±80	unknown	4	Also known as K2-133
TOI-2104	Camelopardalis	10^{h} 06^{m} 26.93^{s}	+83° 05′ 16.22″	13.996	250.3		0.8	4907	unknown	0 (5)	The highest multiplicity system among unconfirmed TESS candidates.
K2-266	Sextans	10^{h} 31^{m} 44.5^{s}	+00° 56′ 15″		252	K	0.69	4285	8.4	4 (2)	
TOI-2141	Hercules	17^{h} 15^{m} 02.96^{s}	+18° 20′ 25.24″	9.46	253.4	G5	0.896	5635	9	3	
K2-155	Taurus	04^{h} 21^{m} 52.5^{s}	+21° 21′ 13″	12.8	267	K7	0.65	4258	unknown	3	
K2-384	Cetus	01^{h} 21^{m} 59.86^{s}	+00° 45′ 04.41″	16.12	270	M?V	0.33	3623±138	unknown	5	
TOI-1136	Draco	12^{h} 48^{m} 44.38 ^{s}	+64° 51′ 18.99″	9.534	275.8		1.022	5770±50	0.7	6 (1)	The planets are in an orbital resonance.
TOI-561	Sextans	09^{h} 52^{m} 44.44^{s}	+06° 12′ 57.97″	10.252	279	G9V	0.785	5455	5	4 (1)	-
Kepler-445	Cygnus	19^{h} 54^{m} 57.0^{s}	+46° 29′ 55″	18	294		0.18	3157	unknown	3	-
TOI-763	Centaurus	12^{h} 57^{m} 52.45^{s}	−39° 45′ 27.71″	10.156	311		0.917	5444	6.2	2 (1)	-
TOI-1749	Draco	18^{h} 50^{m} 56.93^{s}	+64° 25′ 10.08″	13.86	325	M0V	0.58	3985	unknown	3	
K2-229	Virgo	12^{h} 27^{m} 29.5848^{s}	−06° 43′ 18.7660″	10.985	335	K2V	0.837	5185	5.4	3	
Kepler-102	Lyra	18^{h} 45^{m} 55.9^{s}	+47° 12′ 29″	11.492	340	K3V	0.81	4809	1.41	5	
HD 224018	Aquarius	23^{h} 54^{m} 33.36^{s}	−04° 43′ 24.01″	9.715	344	G5V	1.013	5784	7	3 (1)	
V1298 Tauri	Taurus	04^{h} 05^{m} 19.5912^{s}	+20° 09′ 25.5635″	10.31	354	K0-1.5	1.101	4970	0.023	4	This star is a young T Tauri variable.
K2-302	Aquarius	22^{h} 20^{m} 22.7764^{s}	−09° 30′ 34.2934″	11.98	359.3		unknown	3297±73	unknown	3	
K2-198	Virgo	13^{h} 15^{m} 22.5^{s}	−06° 27′ 54″	11.0	362		0.8	5213	unknown	3	
TOI-125	Hydrus	01^{h} 34^{m} 22.73^{s}	−66° 40′ 32.95″	11.02	363		0.859	5320	unknown	3 (2)	
HIP 41378	Cancer	08^{h} 26^{m} 28.0^{s}	+10° 04′ 49″	8.9	378	F8	1.15	6199	unknown	6 (1)	Planet f has an unusually low density, and might have rings or an extended atmosphere.
Kepler-446	Lyra	18^{h} 49^{m} 00.0^{s}	+44° 55′ 16″	16.5	391	M4V	0.22	3359	unknown	3	-
HD 33142	Lepus	05^{h} 07^{m} 35.54^{s}	−13° 59′ 11.34″	7.96	394.3		1.52	5025^{+24}_{−16}	unknown	3	Host star is a giant star with spectral type of K0III.
WASP-132	Lupus	14^{h} 30^{m} 26.2^{s}	−46° 09′ 33″	11.938	403	K4V	0.782	4714	7.2	3	
TOI-451	Eridanus	04^{h} 11^{m} 51.93^{s}	−37° 56′ 23.03″	10.94	404		0.95	5550	0.12	3	
K2-148	Cetus	00^{h} 58^{m} 04.28^{s}	−00° 11′ 35.36″	13.05	407	K7V	0.65	4079±70	unknown	3	A secondary red dwarf is gravitationally bound to K2-148.
K2-165	Virgo	12^{h} 19^{m} 36.12^{s}	+00° 58′ 05.98″	11.33	439	K0V	0.835	5185	unknown	3	
Kepler-68	Cygnus	19^{h} 24^{m} 07.76^{s}	+49° 02′ 25.0″	8.588	440	G1V	1.079	5793	6.3	4	Planet d is a Jupiter-sized planet which orbits in the habitable zone.
HD 28109	Hydrus	04^{h} 20^{m} 57.13^{s}	−68° 06′ 09.51″	9.38	457		1.26	6120±50	unknown	3	
CoRoT-7	Monoceros	06^{h} 43^{m} 49.47^{s}	−01° 03′ 46.9″	11.73	489	K0V	0.93	5275	1.5	3	
XO-2	Lynx	07^{h} 48^{m} 07.4814^{s}	+50° 13′ 03.2578″	11.18	496±3	K0V+K0V	unknown	unknown	6.3	4	Binary with each star orbited by two planets.
Kepler-411	Cygnus	19^{h} 10^{m} 25.3^{s}	+49° 31′ 24″	12.5	499.4	K3V	0.83	4974	unknown	4	
K2-381	Sagittarius	19^{h} 12^{m} 06.46^{s}	−21° 00′ 27.51″	13.01	505	K2	0.754	4473±138	unknown	3	
K2-285	Pisces	23^{h} 17^{m} 32.2^{s}	+01° 18′ 01″	12.03	508	K2V	0.83	4975	unknown	4	
K2-32	Ophiuchus	16^{h} 49^{m} 42.2602^{s}	−19° 32′ 34.151″	12.31	510	G9V	0.856	5275	7.9	4	The planets are likely in a 1:2:5:7 orbital resonance.
TOI-1117	Pavo	18^{h} 14^{m} 24.49^{s}	−66° 25′ 11.91″	11.016	547	G5V	0.97	5635	4.42	3	
TOI-1246	Draco	16^{h} 44^{m} 27.96^{s}	+70° 25′ 46.70″	11.6	558		1.12	5217±50	unknown	4	
Kepler-220	Cygnus	19^{h} 26^{m} 01.45^{s}	+46° 53′ 44.25″	13.2	558	K3V	0.65	4591	8.32	4	
K2-24	Scorpius	16^{h} 10^{m} 17.70^{s}	−24° 59′ 25.26″	11.1	560	G3	1.041	5726	4.9	2 (1)	
K2-352	Cancer	09^{h} 21^{m} 46.8434^{s}	+18° 28′ 10.34710″	11.12	577	G2V	0.98	5791	unknown	3	
Kepler-398	Lyra	19^{h} 25^{m} 52.5^{s}	+40° 20′ 38″		578	K5V	0.72	4493	unknown	3	
TOI-4010	Cassiopeia	01^{h} 20^{m} 51.56^{s}	+66° 04′ 19.92″	12.29	579	K?V	0.88	4960	6.1	4	
Kepler-186	Cygnus	19^{h} 54^{m} 36.6^{s}	+43° 57′ 18″	15.29	579.23	M1V	0.478	3788	unknown	5	Planet f is the first Earth-size exoplanet discovered that orbits in the habitable zone.
K2-37	Scorpius	16^{h} 13^{m} 48.2445^{s}	−24° 47′ 13.4279″	12.52	590	G3V	0.9	5413	unknown	3	
K2-58	Aquarius	22^{h} 15^{m} 17.2364^{s}	−14° 02′ 59.3151″	12.13	596	K2V	0.89	5038	unknown	3	
K2-138	Aquarius	23^{h} 15^{m} 47.77^{s}	−10° 50′ 58.91″	12.21	597±55	K1V	0.93	5378±60	2.3	6	
Kepler-10	Draco	19^{h} 02^{m} 43.03^{s}	+50° 14′ 29.34″	11.043	607	G2V	0.91	5708	10.6	3	
Kepler-249	Cygnus	19^{h} 47^{m} 56.47^{s}	+43° 39′ 30.98″	16.4	621	M2V	0.4	3632	3.09	3	-
K2-38	Scorpius	16^{h} 00^{m} 08.06^{s}	−23° 11′ 21.33″	11.34	630	G3V	1.03	5731±66	unknown	2 (1)	Dust disk in system
WASP-47	Aquarius	22^{h} 04^{m} 49.0^{s}	−12° 01′ 08″	11.9	652	G9V	1.084	5400	unknown	4	One planet is a gas giant which orbits in the habitable zone. WASP-47 is the only planetary system known to have both planets near the hot Jupiter and another planet much further out.
K2-80	Taurus	03^{h} 56^{m} 09.00^{s}	+13° 33′ 32.50″	12.7	655	G8	0.9	5441	unknown	3	
K2-368	Aquarius	22^{h} 10^{m} 32.58^{s}	−11° 09′ 58.02″	13.54	674	K3	0.746	4663±138	unknown	3 (1)	
HAT-P-13	Ursa Major	08^{h} 39^{m} 31.81^{s}	+47° 21′ 07.3″	10.62	698	G4	1.22	5638	5	2 (1)	-
Kepler-19	Cygnus	19^{h} 21^{m} 41^{s}	+37° 51′ 06″	15.178	717	G	0.936	5541	1.9	3	System consists of a thick-envelope Super-Earth and two Neptune-mass planets.
Kepler-296	Lyra	19^{h} 06^{m} 09.6^{s}	+49° 26′ 14.4″	12.6	737.113	K7V + M1V	unknown	4249	unknown	5	All planets orbit around the primary star. Planets e and f are potentially habitable.
Kepler-454	Lyra	19^{h} 09^{m} 55.0^{s}	+38° 13′ 44″	11.57	753	G	1.028	5687	5.25	3	
Kepler-126	Cygnus	19^{h} 17^{m} 23.4^{s}	+44° 12′ 31″	10.505	774.3	F7IV	1.18	6311	3.39	3	-
Kepler-327	Cygnus	19^{h} 30^{m} 34.2^{s}	+44° 05′ 16″	15.7	789	M1V	0.57	3920	3.28	3	-
Kepler-25	Lyra	19^{h} 06^{m} 33.0^{s}	+39° 29′ 16″	11	799	F	1.22	6190	unknown	3	Two planets were discovered by transit-timing variations, and the third planet was discovered by follow-up radial velocity measurements.
TOI-7510	Telescopium	18^{h} 14^{m} 54.77^{s}	−54° 26′ 02.60″	11.989	812	G3	1.063	5720	4.4	3	
Kepler-1130	Lyra	19^{h} 00^{m} 49.78^{s}	+45° 23′ 03.60″	12.5	813	K0V	0.9	5403	1.58	3 (1)	
Kepler-352	Cygnus	19^{h} 59^{m} 35.19^{s}	+46° 03′ 06.85″	13.1	824		0.86	5279	3.47	3 (1)	-
Kepler-114	Cygnus	19^{h} 36^{m} 29.0^{s}	+48° 20′ 58″	13.7	846	K	0.71	4450	unknown	3	
Kepler-267	Cygnus	19^{h} 59^{m} 19.34^{s}	+47° 09′ 27.27″	16.7	864	M1V	0.56	3973	3.31	3	-
Kepler-381	Lyra	19^{h} 00^{m} 43.89^{s}	+43° 49′ 51.70″	10.5	872	F5	1.44	6337	2.57	3	-
Kepler-54	Cygnus	19^{h} 39^{m} 06.0^{s}	+43° 03′ 23″	16.3	886	M	0.52	3705	unknown	3	
Kepler-968	Draco	19^{h} 02^{m} 24.62^{s}	+50° 06′ 43.34″	14.6	947		0.681	4413	2.14	3	
Kepler-20	Lyra	19^{h} 10^{m} 47.524^{s}	+42° 20′ 19.30″	12.51	950	G8V	0.912	5466	8.8	5 (1)	Planets e and f were the first Earth-sized planets to be discovered.
K2-157	Virgo	12^{h} 15^{m} 00.36^{s}	−05° 46′ 55.26″	12.82	973	G9V	0.89	5334	8.8	3	
K2-19	Virgo	11^{h} 39^{m} 50.4804^{s}	+00° 36′ 12.8773″	13.002	976	K0V or G9V	0.918	5250±70	8	3	-
PSR B1257+12	Virgo	13^{h} 00^{m} 03.58^{s}	+12° 40′ 56.5″	24.31	980	pulsar	1.444	28856	0.797	3	The only known pulsar with a multiplanetary system, and the first exoplanets and multiplanetary system to be confirmed. Star with dimmest apparent magnitude to have a multiplanetary system.
Kepler-62	Lyra	18^{h} 52^{m} 51.060^{s}	+45° 20′ 59.507″	13.75	990	K2V	0.69	4925	7	5	Planets e and f orbit in the habitable zone.
Kepler-48	Cygnus	19^{h} 56^{m} 33.41^{s}	+40° 56′ 56.47″	13.04	1000	K	0.88	5190	unknown	5	
Kepler-100	Lyra	19^{h} 25^{m} 32.6^{s}	+41° 59′ 24″		1011	G1IV	1.109	5825	6.5	4	
Kepler-49	Cygnus	19^{h} 29^{m} 11.0^{s}	+40° 35′ 30″	15.5	1015	K	0.55	3974	unknown	4	
Kepler-65	Lyra	19^{h} 14^{m} 45.3^{s}	+41° 09′ 04.2″	11.018	1019	F6IV	1.199	6211	unknown	4	-
Kepler-158	Lyra	18^{h} 56^{m} 07.77^{s}	+39° 46′ 53.53″	14.7	1028	K	0.75	4720	3.98	3	-
Kepler-130	Lyra	19^{h} 13^{m} 48.2^{s}	+40° 14′ 43″	11.57	1033	G1V	1.02	6012	5.89	3	-
Kepler-52	Draco	19^{h} 06^{m} 57.0^{s}	+49° 58′ 33″	15.5	1049	K	0.58	4075	unknown	3	
Kepler-32	Cygnus	19^{h} 51^{m} 22.2^{s}	+46° 34′ 27″	16.4	1056	M1V	0.57	3900	2.69	5	Planet f is smaller than Earth.
K2-314	Libra	15^{h} 13^{m} 00.0^{s}	−16° 43′ 29″	11.4	1059	G8IV/V	1.05	5430	9	3	
K2-219	Pisces	00^{h} 51^{m} 22.9^{s}	+08° 52′ 04″	12.09	1071	G2	1.02	5753±50	unknown	3	
Kepler-197	Cygnus	19^{h} 40^{m} 54.3^{s}	+50° 33′ 32″	11.8	1078	F5	1.01	6180	5.37	4	
K2-268	Cancer	08^{h} 54^{m} 50.2862^{s}	+11° 50′ 53.7745″	13.85	1079		unknown	unknown	unknown	5	
K2-183	Cancer	08^{h} 20^{m} 01.7184^{s}	+14° 01′ 10.0711″	12.85	1083		unknown	5482±50	unknown	3	
K2-187	Cancer	08^{h} 50^{m} 05.6682^{s}	+23° 11′ 33.3712″	12.864	1090	G?V	0.967	5438±63	unknown	4	
K2-16	Virgo	11^{h} 40^{m} 23.33^{s}	+04° 33′ 26.75″	14.7	1093	K3V	0.68	4742	unknown	3	-
Kepler-1542	Lyra	19^{h} 02^{m} 54.8^{s}	+42° 39′ 16″		1096	G5V	0.94	5564	unknown	4 (1)	-
Kepler-26	Lyra	18^{h} 59^{m} 46^{s}	+46° 34′ 00″	16	1100	M0V	0.65	4500	unknown	4	Transiting exoplanets which are low-density planets below the size of Neptune.
TOI-4504	Carina	07^{h} 37^{m} 52.15^{s}	−62° 04′ 41.80″	13.36	1117	K1V	0.89	5315	10	3	The farthest multiplanetary system where exoplanets were not discovered by the Kepler space telescope.
Kepler-167	Cygnus	19^{h} 30^{m} 38.0^{s}	+38° 20′ 43″		1119 ± 6		0.76	4796	unknown	4	Planet e is the first transiting Jupiter analog discovered.
Kepler-332	Lyra	19^{h} 06^{m} 39.1^{s}	+47° 24′ 49″	14.2	1123		0.8	5008	2.82	3	-
Kepler-81	Cygnus	19^{h} 34^{m} 32.9^{s}	+42° 49′ 30″	15.56	1136	K?V	0.648	4391	unknown	3	
Kepler-132	Lyra	18^{h} 52^{m} 56.6^{s}	+41° 20′ 35″		1140	F9	0.98	6003	unknown	4	
Kepler-127	Lyra	19^{h} 00^{m} 45.6^{s}	+46° 01′ 41″	11.75	1151	G0	1.25	6225	2.63	3	-
Kepler-80	Cygnus	19^{h} 44^{m} 27.0^{s}	+39° 58′ 44″	14.804	1218	M0V	0.73	4250	unknown	6	Red dwarf star with six confirmed planets. Five of them are in an orbital resonance.
Kepler-159	Cygnus	19^{h} 48^{m} 16.8^{s}	+40° 52′ 08″		1219	K	0.63	4625	unknown	2 (1)	-
K2-299	Aquarius	22^{h} 05^{m} 06.5342^{s}	−14° 07′ 18.0135″	13.12	1220		unknown	5724±72	unknown	3	
Kepler-88	Lyra	19^{h} 24^{m} 35.5431^{s}	+40° 40′ 09.8098″	13.5	1243	G8IV	1.022	5513±67	2.45	3	
Kepler-221	Cygnus	19^{h} 46^{m} 37.14^{s}	+46° 50′ 06.81″	14.0	1256	G5	0.87	5296	4.57	4	
Kepler-174	Lyra	19^{h} 09^{m} 45.4^{s}	+43° 49′ 56″		1269	K	unknown	4880	unknown	3	Planet d may orbit in the habitable zone.
Kepler-139	Lyra	18^{h} 49^{m} 34.07^{s}	+43° 53′ 21.90″	12.775	1275	G8IV-V	1.05	5680	5.62	5	
Kepler-83	Lyra	18^{h} 48^{m} 55.8^{s}	+43° 39′ 56″	16.51	1306	K7V	0.664	4164	unknown	3	-
Kepler-104	Lyra	19^{h} 10^{m} 25.1^{s}	+42° 10′ 00″	12.73	1307	G0V	1.01	6032	3.72	3	The system has a wide companion K-type star.
TOI-375	Lyra	03^{h} 08^{m} 35.98^{s}	−77° 22′ 59.98″	11.29	1316	G8IV	1.441	5259.9	2.94	3	The system contains three gas giants orbiting a post-main-sequence star at the end of the subgiant phase.
Kepler-271	Lyra	18^{h} 52^{m} 00.7^{s}	+44° 17′ 03″		1319	G7V	0.9	5524	unknown	3 (2)	-
Kepler-169	Lyra	19^{h} 03^{m} 60.0^{s}	+40° 55′ 10″	12.186	1326	K2V	0.86	4997	unknown	5	
Kepler-129	Draco	19^{h} 01^{m} 14.68^{s}	+47° 50′ 54.52″	11.8	1333	G4V	1.07	5533	8.91	3	
Kepler-451	Cygnus	19^{h} 38^{m} 32.61^{s}	+46° 03′ 59.1″		1340	sdB; M	0.6	29564	6	3	Three circumbinary planets orbit around the Kepler-451 binary pair.
Kepler-124	Draco	19^{h} 07^{m} 00.7^{s}	+49° 03′ 54″	14.33	1370		0.73	5133	1.82	3	-
Kepler-334	Lyra	19^{h} 08^{m} 33.8^{s}	+47° 06′ 55″	12.8	1391	G0	1.07	5958	4.07	3	-
Kepler-235	Lyra	19^{h} 04^{m} 18.98^{s}	+39° 16′ 41.65″	16.6	1396	M0V	0.54	4067	3.8	4	
Kepler-304	Cygnus	19^{h} 37^{m} 46.0^{s}	+40° 33′ 27″		1418	K	0.8	4731	unknown	4	
Kepler-18	Cygnus	19^{h} 52^{m} 19.06^{s}	+44° 44′ 46.76″	13.549	1430	G7V	0.97	5345	10	3	
Kepler-106	Cygnus	20^{h} 03^{m} 27.4^{s}	+44° 20′ 15″	12.882	1449	G1V	1	5858	4.83	4	
Kepler-92	Lyra	19^{h} 16^{m} 21.0^{s}	+41° 33′ 47″	11.6	1463	G1IV	1.209	5871	5.52	3	
Kepler-196	Lyra	18^{h} 59^{m} 52.44^{s}	+42° 04′ 44.84″	14.3	1472	K3	0.85	5163	3.98	3	
Kepler-450	Cygnus	19^{h} 41^{m} 56.8^{s}	+51° 00′ 49″	11.684	1487	F	1.19	6152	unknown	3	
Kepler-89	Cygnus	19^{h} 49^{m} 20.0^{s}	+41° 53′ 28″	12.4	1580	F8V	1.25	6116	3.9	4	Farthest F-type main sequence star from the Sun with a multiplanetary system. One study found hints of additional planets orbiting Kepler-89.
Kepler-215	Cygnus	19^{h} 39^{m} 53.65^{s}	+45° 12′ 49.27″	13.7	1585	G3	0.94	5679	1.62	4	
Kepler-431	Lyra	18^{h} 44^{m} 26.9^{s}	+43° 13′ 40″	12.1	1587	F6IV	1.15	6087	4.27	3	
Kepler-326	Cygnus	19^{h} 37^{m} 18.1^{s}	+46° 00′ 08″	13.8	1591	K1V	0.85	5148	4.68	3	-
Kepler-1530	Cygnus	19^{h} 12^{m} 38.99^{s}	+48° 09′ 54.55″	14.2	1598	G7	0.92	5477	4.27	3	
Kepler-1388	Lyra	18^{h} 53^{m} 20.6^{s}	+47° 10′ 28″		1604		0.63	4098	unknown	4 (1)	-
Kepler-198	Lyra	19^{h} 22^{m} 41.55^{s}	+38° 41′ 27.62″	13.7	1616	F9	0.97	5636	3.72	3	-
Kepler-324	Draco	19^{h} 05^{m} 53.15^{s}	+49° 38′ 56.74″	14.2	1636		0.87	5255	5.37	4	-
K2-282	Pisces	00^{h} 53^{m} 43.6833^{s}	+07° 59′ 43.1397″	14.04	1638	G?V	0.94	5499±109	unknown	3	
Kepler-319	Lyra	19^{h} 15^{m} 14.87^{s}	+39° 46′ 14.32″	13.9	1642	G4V	0.96	5613	3.55	3	-
Kepler-298	Draco	18^{h} 52^{m} 09.56^{s}	+48° 49′ 31.19″	15.6	1690		0.69	4612	2.4	3	-
Kepler-107	Cygnus	19^{h} 48^{m} 06.8^{s}	+48° 12′ 31″	12.7	1714	G2V	1.238	5851	4.29	4	-
Kepler-176	Cygnus	19^{h} 38^{m} 40.3^{s}	+43° 51′ 12″		1746		unknown	5232	unknown	4	
Kepler-1669	Cygnus	19^{h} 49^{m} 43.29^{s}	+39° 50′ 52.37″	16.5	1772	M0V	unknown	unknown	unknown	3	-
Kepler-142	Cygnus	19^{h} 40^{m} 28.5^{s}	+48° 28′ 53″	13.3	1790		1.06	5872	5.5	3	-
Kepler-338	Lyra	18^{h} 51^{m} 54.9^{s}	+40° 47′ 04″	12.2	1803	G0	1.2	5999	4.79	4	
Kepler-354	Lyra	19^{h} 03^{m} 00.4^{s}	+41° 20′ 08″	15.8	1807	K5	0.73	4634	5.25	3	-
Kepler-1047	Cygnus	19^{h} 14^{m} 35.1^{s}	+50° 47′ 20″		1846	G2V	1.08	5754	unknown	3	-
Kepler-149	Lyra	19^{h} 03^{m} 24.9^{s}	+38° 23′ 03″	14.1	1862	K0V	0.92	5377	6.31	3	-
Kepler-55	Lyra	19^{h} 00^{m} 40.0^{s}	+44° 01′ 35″	16.3	1888	K	0.62	4362	unknown	5	Planet c may orbit in the inner habitable zone.
Kepler-331	Lyra	19^{h} 27^{m} 20.2^{s}	+39° 18′ 26″	16.2	1892		0.74	4631	3.24	3	-
Kepler-206	Lyra	19^{h} 26^{m} 32.3^{s}	+41° 50′ 02″	13.5	1939	G3	1.05	5853	5.25	3	-
Kepler-191	Cygnus	19^{h} 24^{m} 44.0^{s}	+45° 19′ 23″	15.0	1939	G9	0.84	5215	4.9	3	
Kepler-336	Lyra	19^{h} 20^{m} 57.0^{s}	+41° 19′ 53″	13.7	1939	G3	1.09	5911	4.9	3	-
Kepler-1987	Cygnus	19^{h} 43^{m} 18.11^{s}	+42° 56′ 36.14″	15.5	1943		0.73	4601	unknown	4	
Kepler-310	Cygnus	19^{h} 15^{m} 21.43^{s}	+46° 59′ 12.29″	14.3	1964		0.91	5551	4.47	3	-
Kepler-166	Cygnus	19^{h} 32^{m} 38.4^{s}	+48° 52′ 52″		1968	G	0.88	5413	unknown	3	-
Kepler-184	Lyra	19^{h} 27^{m} 48.5^{s}	+43° 04′ 29″	14.4	1991		0.97	5699	4.47	3	-
Kepler-339	Cygnus	19^{h} 33^{m} 24.41^{s}	+48° 26′ 40.53″	14.7	2011	G7	0.93	5571	4.37	3	-
Kepler-402	Lyra	19^{h} 13^{m} 28.9^{s}	+43° 21′ 17″	13.3	2040	F2	1.15	6199	3.31	4 (1)	-
Kepler-549	Lyra	18^{h} 52^{m} 05.48^{s}	+47° 15′ 40.12″	14.8	2072		0.88	5360	4.57	3	-
Kepler-192	Lyra	19^{h} 11^{m} 40.3^{s}	+45° 35′ 34″	14.2	2125	G7	0.94	5487	6.76	3	
Kepler-218	Cygnus	19^{h} 41^{m} 39.1^{s}	+46° 15′ 59″	14.1	2141	G8IV	1.01	5542	5.62	3	
Kepler-11	Cygnus	19^{h} 48^{m} 27.62^{s}	+41° 54′ 32.9″	13.69	2150 ±20	G6V	0.954	5681	7.834	6	Farthest star from the Sun with exactly six exoplanets. First system discovered with six transiting planets. The planets have low densities.
Kepler-247	Lyra	19^{h} 14^{m} 34.2^{s}	+43° 02′ 21″	15.46	2165		0.84	5130	4.27	3	
Kepler-1254	Draco	19^{h} 34^{m} 59.3^{s}	+45° 06′ 26″		2205		0.78	4985	unknown	3	-
Kepler-357	Cygnus	19^{h} 24^{m} 58.3^{s}	+44° 00′ 31″	15.7	2246		0.77	5029	4.47	3	-
Kepler-416	Lyra	19^{h} 26^{m} 13.67^{s}	+39° 13′ 38.25″	14.2	2253		1.01	5758	4.9	3 (1)	-
Kepler-297	Draco	18^{h} 52^{m} 50.20^{s}	+48° 46′ 39.42″	14.3	2257		0.98	5801	3.47	3	-
Kepler-290	Lyra	19^{h} 05^{m} 38.41^{s}	+42° 40′ 53.45″	15.8	2266		0.79	4958	4.47	3	-
Kepler-289	Cygnus	19^{h} 49^{m} 51.7^{s}	+42° 52′ 58″	12.9	2283	G0V	1.08	5990	0.65	3 (1)	-
Kepler-203	Cygnus	19^{h} 01^{m} 23.3^{s}	+41° 45′ 43″	14.1	2294	G1	1	5794	5.5	3	-
Kepler-178	Lyra	19^{h} 08^{m} 24.3^{s}	+46° 53′ 47″	14.8	2335		0.94	5535	4.68	3	-
Kepler-301	Draco	18^{h} 55^{m} 55.90^{s}	+49° 13′ 58.62″	14.5	2346	F9	0.98	5717	4.17	3	-
Kepler-222	Lyra	19^{h} 11^{m} 37.46^{s}	+46° 56′ 15.89″	15.4	2475		0.88	5295	4.79	3	-
Kepler-250	Cygnus	19^{h} 18^{m} 22.74^{s}	+44° 08′ 30.52″	15.8	2481		0.83	5097	5.13	3	-
Kepler-363	Lyra	18^{h} 52^{m} 46.1^{s}	+41° 18′ 19″	13.47	2487	G5V	1.1	5681	5.25	3	-
Kepler-85	Cygnus	19^{h} 23^{m} 54.0^{s}	+45° 17′ 25″	15.0	2495	G	0.92	5666	unknown	4	
Kepler-1321	Cygnus	19^{h} 38^{m} 06.86^{s}	+46° 38′ 27.15″	17.5	2509	M1V	0.54	4094	4.17	3	
Kepler-157	Lyra	19^{h} 24^{m} 23.3^{s}	+38° 52′ 32″		2523	G2V	1.02	5774	unknown	3	
Kepler-208	Cygnus	19^{h} 35^{m} 33.65^{s}	+42° 31′ 40.59″	13.68	2529	G0	1.16	5951	4.37	4	
Kepler-306	Lyra	19^{h} 14^{m} 09.29^{s}	+40° 36′ 57.80″	15.6	2530		0.81	5011	2.63	4	
Kepler-311	Lyra	18^{h} 48^{m} 14.71^{s}	+47° 05′ 07.79″	13.9	2540	G0.5V	1.08	6009	4.17	3	-
Kepler-257	Cygnus	19^{h} 49^{m} 15.84^{s}	+46° 01′ 23.75″	15.7	2545		0.85	5209	4.79	3	-
Kepler-342	Cygnus	19^{h} 24^{m} 23.3^{s}	+38° 52′ 32″		2549	F	1.13	6175	unknown	4	
Kepler-224	Cygnus	19^{h} 23^{m} 44.22^{s}	+47° 21′ 27.15″	15.9	2551		0.78	5093	2.29	4	
Kepler-219	Cygnus	19^{h} 14^{m} 57.35^{s}	+46° 45′ 45.33″	13.8	2567	G2V	1.16	5910	4.57	3	-
Kepler-148	Cygnus	19^{h} 19^{m} 08.7^{s}	+46° 51′ 32″		2580	K?V	0.83	5019.0±122.0	unknown	3	
Kepler-529	Draco	19^{h} 03^{m} 33.22^{s}	+47° 52′ 49.31″	13.8	2606		1.07	6087	3.98	3	-
Kepler-51	Cygnus	19^{h} 45^{m} 55.0^{s}	+49° 56′ 16″	15.0	2610	G?V	1	5803	unknown	4	Super-puff planets with some of the lowest densities known.
Kepler-1073	Cygnus	19^{h} 36^{m} 36.65^{s}	+38° 13′ 59.12″	14.7	2642	G3V	1	5792	3.72	3 (1)	
Kepler-325	Cygnus	19^{h} 19^{m} 20.5^{s}	+49° 49′ 32″	15.2	2685	G5	0.91	5535	4.17	3	-
Kepler-229	Draco	19^{h} 07^{m} 59.87^{s}	+48° 22′ 32.83″	16.2	2695		0.8	5014	4.9	3	-
Kepler-172	Lyra	19^{h} 47^{m} 05.3^{s}	+41° 45′ 20″	14.7	2703	G8	1	5599	6.46	4	-
Kepler-253	Cygnus	19^{h} 27^{m} 22.06^{s}	+44° 51′ 29.25″	15.8	2735		0.85	5216	4.57	3	-
Kepler-403	Cygnus	19^{h} 19^{m} 41.1^{s}	+46° 44′ 40″		2741	F9IV-V	1.25	6090	unknown	3 (1)	-
Kepler-9	Lyra	19^{h} 02^{m} 17.76^{s}	+38° 24′ 03.2″	13.91	2754	G2V	0.998	5722	3.008	3	First multiplanetary system to be discovered by the Kepler Space Telescope.
Kepler-23	Cygnus	19^{h} 36^{m} 52.0^{s}	+49° 28′ 45″	14	2790	G5V	1.11	5760	unknown	3	-
Kepler-46	Cygnus	19^{h} 17^{m} 05.0^{s}	+42° 36′ 15″	15.3	2795	K?V	0.902	5155	9.9	3	-
Kepler-245	Cygnus	19^{h} 26^{m} 33.4^{s}	+42° 26′ 11″	15.5	2810		0.86	5174	3.63	4	
Kepler-171	Cygnus	19^{h} 47^{m} 05.3^{s}	+41° 45′ 20″	15.1	2818		1.07	5949	3.47	3	-
Kepler-1311	Cygnus	19^{h} 18^{m} 36.30^{s}	+43° 49′ 28.00″	13.5	2826	G0IV-V	1.05	5748	7.59	3	
Kepler-305	Cygnus	19^{h} 56^{m} 53.83^{s}	+40° 20′ 35.46″	15.812	2833	K	0.85	4918	unknown	4	
Kepler-90	Draco	18^{h} 57^{m} 44.0^{s}	+49° 18′ 19″	14.0	2840 ± 40	F9 IV/V	1.13	5930	2	8	All eight exoplanets are larger than Earth and are within 1.1 AU of the parent star. Only star apart from the Sun with at least eight planets. A Hill stability test shows that the system is stable. Planet h orbits in the habitable zone.
Kepler-487	Cygnus	19^{h} 41^{m} 08.94^{s}	+41° 13′ 19.21″	14.9	2845		0.91	5444	5.62	3 (1)	-
Kepler-207	Lyra	19^{h} 20^{m} 07.32^{s}	+42° 09′ 57.80″	13.2	2856	G3	1.2	5989	4.17	3	-
Kepler-272	Cygnus	19^{h} 56^{m} 30.61^{s}	+47° 35′ 37.79″	14.8	2902	G6	0.97	5605	4.9	3	-
Kepler-164	Lyra	19^{h} 11^{m} 07.4^{s}	+47° 37′ 48″	14.4	2905		1.09	6048	3.47	4	-
Kepler-150	Lyra	19^{h} 12^{m} 56.2^{s}	+40° 31′ 15″	15.2	2906	G?V	0.94	5560	4.557	5	Planet f orbits in the habitable zone.
Kepler-619	Cygnus	19^{h} 23^{m} 23.78^{s}	+48° 24′ 57.52″	14.8	2938	G3	1.09	5980	3.47	3	-
Kepler-399	Cygnus	19^{h} 58^{m} 00.4^{s}	+40° 40′ 15″	14.7	2948		0.94	5682	3.98	3	-
Kepler-82	Cygnus	19^{h} 31^{m} 29.61^{s}	+42° 57′ 58.09″	15.158	2949	G?V	0.91	5512	unknown	5	
Kepler-154	Cygnus	19^{h} 19^{m} 07.3^{s}	+49° 53′ 48″		2985	G3V	0.98	5690	unknown	5	
Kepler-251	Cygnus	19^{h} 46^{m} 15.89^{s}	+44° 06′ 20.91″	15.3	3016		0.95	5622	3.63	4	
Kepler-770	Lyra	19^{h} 05^{m} 57.71^{s}	+38° 22′ 29.54″	14.9	3035		0.94	5598	4.57	3	-
Kepler-56	Cygnus	19^{h} 35^{m} 02.0^{s}	+41° 52′ 19″	13	3060	K?III	1.32	4840	3.5	3	
Kepler-616	Cygnus	19^{h} 39^{m} 57.39^{s}	+46° 50′ 17.90″	15.0	3085		0.98	5753	3.89	3 (1)	-
Kepler-350	Lyra	19^{h} 01^{m} 41.0^{s}	+39° 42′ 22″	13.8	3121	F	1.03	6215	unknown	3	
Kepler-603	Cygnus	19^{h} 37^{m} 07.4^{s}	+42° 17′ 27″		3134	G2V	1.01	5808	unknown	3	-
Kepler-763	Cygnus	19^{h} 28^{m} 34.69^{s}	+47° 09′ 26.50″	16.0	3139		0.84	5166	4.79	3 (1)	-
Kepler-160	Lyra	19^{h} 11^{m} 05.65^{s}	+42° 52′ 09.5″	13.101	3140	G2V	unknown	5470	unknown	3 (1)	The unconfirmed planet Kepler-160e (or KOI-456.04) is a potentially habitable planet.
Kepler-401	Cygnus	19^{h} 20^{m} 19.9^{s}	+50° 51′ 49″		3149	F8V	1.17	6117	unknown	3	
Kepler-58	Cygnus	19^{h} 45^{m} 26.0^{s}	+39° 06′ 55″	15.3	3161	G1V	1.04	5843	unknown	4	
Kepler-226	Cygnus	19^{h} 29^{m} 30.26^{s}	+47° 52′ 51.45″	15.5	3197		0.89	5427	4.37	3	-
Kepler-79	Cygnus	20^{h} 02^{m} 04.11^{s}	+44° 22′ 53.69″	13.914	3329	F	1.17	6187	unknown	4	
Kepler-60	Cygnus	19^{h} 15^{m} 50.70^{s}	+42° 15′ 54.04″	13.959	3343	G	1.04	5915	unknown	3 (1)	-
Kepler-256	Cygnus	19^{h} 30^{m} 19.30^{s}	+46° 05′ 50.49″	15.2	3348		0.97	5607	9.55	4	
Kepler-122	Lyra	19^{h} 24^{m} 26.9^{s}	+39° 56′ 57″		3351	F	1.08	6050	unknown	5	
Kepler-244	Lyra	19^{h} 08^{m} 58.23^{s}	+42° 18′ 05.11″	15.7	3381		0.82	5273	4.79	3	-
Kepler-279	Lyra	19^{h} 09^{m} 34.0^{s}	+42° 11′ 42″	13.7	3383	F	1.1	6562	unknown	3 (1)	
Kepler-341	Lyra	19^{h} 19^{m} 26.77^{s}	+43° 28′ 21.87″	14.7	3415	G3	1	5755	4.68	4	
Kepler-299	Draco	18^{h} 52^{m} 49.68^{s}	+48° 34′ 49.88″	15.2	3432		0.95	5650	6.03	4	
Kepler-255	Cygnus	19^{h} 44^{m} 15.4^{s}	+45° 58′ 37″		3433	G6V	0.9	5573	unknown	3	
Kepler-47	Cygnus	19^{h} 41^{m} 11.5^{s}	+46° 55′ 13.69″	15.178	3442	G M	1.043	5636(A) (B is unknown)	4.5	3	Circumbinary planets, with one of the planets orbiting in the habitable zone.
Kepler-292	Cygnus	19^{h} 43^{m} 03.84^{s}	+43° 25′ 27.4″	13.97	3446	K0V	0.85	5299	unknown	5	
Kepler-394	Cygnus	19^{h} 45^{m} 12.48^{s}	+50° 40′ 20.32″	14.9	3453	G2	1.13	6122	3.24	3	-
Kepler-457	Lyra	18^{h} 49^{m} 30.61^{s}	+44° 41′ 40.45″	14.4	3497		1.04	6474	unknown	3	
Kepler-27	Cygnus	19^{h} 28^{m} 56.82^{s}	+41° 05′ 9.15″	15.855	3500	G5V	0.65	5400	unknown	3 (2)	
Kepler-351	Lyra	19^{h} 05^{m} 48.6^{s}	+42° 39′ 28″		3535	G?V	0.89	5643	unknown	3	
Kepler-194	Cygnus	19^{h} 27^{m} 53.1^{s}	+47° 51′ 51″	15.0	3581	G3	1.09	5965	3.55	3	-
Kepler-217	Cygnus	19^{h} 32^{m} 09.1^{s}	+46° 16′ 39″	13.2	3603	F3V	1.37	6341	2.63	3	
Kepler-276	Cygnus	19^{h} 34^{m} 16^{s}	+39° 02′ 11″	15.368	3734	G?V	1.1	5812	unknown	3	
Kepler-288	Lyra	19^{h} 15^{m} 39.94^{s}	+39° 35′ 41.11″	15.3	3895	G1V	1.03	5837	3.72	3	-
Kepler-24	Lyra	19^{h} 21^{m} 39.18^{s}	+38° 20′ 37.51″	14.925	3910	G1V	1.03	5800	unknown	4	-
Kepler-286	Cygnus	19^{h} 22^{m} 42.28^{s}	+48° 17′ 39.25″	15.9	4001		0.96	5742	2.75	4	
Kepler-87	Cygnus	19^{h} 51^{m} 40.0^{s}	+46° 57′ 54″	15	4021	G4IV	1.1	5600	7.5	2 (2)	
Kepler-33	Lyra	19^{h} 16^{m} 18.61^{s}	+46° 00′ 18.8″	13.988	4090	G1IV	1.164	5849	4.27	5	
Kepler-374	Cygnus	19^{h} 36^{m} 33.1^{s}	+42° 22′ 14″	14.7	4128	G3	1.04	5898	3.89	3 (2)	-
Kepler-265	Lyra	19^{h} 22^{m} 02.51^{s}	+41° 14′ 41.07″	15.5	4176	G3	0.98	5883	5.25	4	
Kepler-347	Cygnus	19^{h} 16^{m} 47.90^{s}	+49° 18′ 20.31″	14.6	4236		1.05	5892	3.89	3	-
Kepler-282	Lyra	18^{h} 58^{m} 43.0^{s}	+44° 47′ 51″	15.2	4363	G?V	0.97	5876	unknown	4	
Kepler-758	Cygnus	19^{h} 32^{m} 20.3^{s}	+41° 08′ 08″		4413		1.16	6228	unknown	4	
Kepler-53	Lyra	19^{h} 21^{m} 51.0^{s}	+40° 33′ 45″	16	4455	G?V	0.98	5858	unknown	3	
Kepler-254	Lyra	19^{h} 12^{m} 39.52^{s}	+45° 48′ 59.13″	16.0	4532		0.93	5611	3.98	3	-
Kepler-30	Lyra	19^{h} 01^{m} 08.07^{s}	+38° 56′ 50.21″	15.403	4560	G6V	0.99	5498	unknown	3	
Kepler-84	Cygnus	19^{h} 53^{m} 00.49^{s}	+40° 29′ 45.87″	14.764	4700	G3IV	1	5755	unknown	5	
Kepler-359	Cygnus	19^{h} 33^{m} 10.5^{s}	+42° 11′ 47″	15.8	4707		1.14	6090	3.02	3	-
Kepler-372	Cygnus	19^{h} 25^{m} 01.5^{s}	+49° 15′ 32″	14.9	4873		1.12	6146	3.09	3	-
Kepler-385	Cygnus	19^{h} 37^{m} 21.23^{s}	+50° 20′ 11.55″	15.76	4900	F8V	0.99	5835	unknown	3 (4)	
Kepler-228	Cygnus	19^{h} 45^{m} 08.66^{s}	+48° 13′ 28.68″	15.9	5364		0.95	5630	4.07	3	-
Kepler-31	Cygnus	19^{h} 36^{m} 06.0^{s}	+45° 51′ 11″	15.5	5429	F	1.21	6340	unknown	3 (1)	The three planets are in an orbital resonance.
Kepler-295	Lyra	19^{h} 01^{m} 23.00^{s}	+45° 22′ 03.99″	14.6	5542		0.89	5411	4.79	3	-
Kepler-281	Cygnus	19^{h} 36^{m} 25.96^{s}	+44° 46′ 14.35″	15.9	5693		0.95	5623	4.68	3	-
Kepler-238	Lyra	19^{h} 11^{m} 35^{s}	+40° 38′ 16″	15.084	5867	G5IV	1.06	5614	unknown	5	-
Kepler-223	Cygnus	19^{h} 53^{m} 16.41^{s}	+47° 16′ 46.14″	15.6	6066		0.98	5746	4.27	4	-
Kepler-1468	Cygnus	19^{h} 34^{m} 04.76^{s}	+41° 16′ 38.52″	15.1	6194		1.04	5893	3.55	3	-
Kepler-275	Cygnus	19^{h} 29^{m} 55.13^{s}	+38° 30′ 53.65″	15.3	6635		1.16	6193	3.31	3 (1)	Multiplanetary system with the lowest measured parallax; it is therefore thought to be the farthest known from the Sun.
Kepler-1649	Cygnus	19^{h} 30^{m} 00.90^{s}	+41° 49′ 49.52″	16.7	301	M5V	0.2	3240 ± 61	4.5	2	Planet c is potentially habitable. (see: Kepler-1649c)

== Stars orbited by both planets and brown dwarfs ==
These are stars orbited by objects on both sides of the ~13 Jupiter mass dividing line.

- 54 Piscium (HD 3651)
- HD 168443
- HD 4113 A
- Epsilon Indi A
- HD 82943
- Pi Mensae (TOI-144)
- HD 38529
- HD 245134
- KMT-2020-BLG-0414L
- KMT-2024-BLG-0404L

== See also ==
- Lists of exoplanets
- Methods of detecting exoplanets
- List of exoplanet firsts
- List of exoplanet extremes
- List of brown dwarfs
- Lists of stars
- List of nearest stars
- List of stars with proplyds
- Lists of astronomical objects

For links to specific lists of exoplanets see:

- List of exoplanets detected by microlensing
- List of exoplanets detected by radial velocity
- List of exoplanets detected by timing
- List of directly imaged exoplanets
- List of transiting exoplanets
- List of nearest terrestrial exoplanet candidates

Online archives:

- NASA Exoplanet Archive
