= List of exoplanets discovered in 2017 =

This is a list of exoplanets discovered in 2017.

For exoplanets detected only by radial velocity, the mass value is actually a lower limit. (See Minimum mass for more information)

Name	Mass (M_{J})	Radius (R_{J})	Period (days)	Semi-major axis (AU)	Temp. (K)	Discovery method	Distance (ly)	Host star mass (M_{☉})	Host star temp. (K)	Remarks
BD+03 2562 b	6.4		481.9	1.3		radial vel.	8540	1.14	4095	
CoRoT-30 b	2.90±0.22	1.009±0.076	9.06005±0.00024	0.0844±0.0012		transit	3100±200	0.98^{+0.03}_{−0.05}	5650±100	
CoRoT-31 b	0.84±0.34	1.46±0.30	4.62941±0.00075	0.0586±0.0034		transit	7000±2000	1.25^{+0.22}_{−0.21}	5700±120	
CoRoT-32 b	0.15	0.57	6.71837	0.071	938	transit		1.08	5970	Host star also known as CoRoT 223977153
Luyten b	0.00909		18.6498	0.091101	259	radial vel.	12	0.29	3382	Potentially habitable exoplanet.
Luyten c	0.00371		4.7234	0.036467		radial vel.	12	0.29	3382	
Gliese 625 b	0.00887		14.628	0.078361		radial vel.	21	0.30	3499	
Gliese 1148 c	0.2141		532.58	0.912		radial vel.	35.98	0.357±0.013		Host star also known as Ross 1003
Gliese 3138 b	0.0056		1.22003	0.0197		radial vel.	92.9	0.68	3717	
Gliese 3138 c	0.01315		5.974	0.057		radial vel.	92.9	0.68	3717	
Gliese 3138 d	0.03304		257.8	0.698		radial vel.	92.9	0.68	3717	
Gliese 3293 d	0.02391		48.1345	0.19394		radial vel.	51.4	0.42	3466	
Gliese 3293 e	0.01032		13.2543	0.08208		radial vel.	51.4	0.42	3466	
Gliese 3323 b	0.00636		5.3636	0.03282		radial vel.	17.4	0.16	3159	
Gliese 3323 c	0.00727		40.54	0.1264		radial vel.	17.4	0.16	3159	
Gliese 3942 b	0.0225		6.905	0.0608	590	radial vel.	55.3	0.63	3867	
HAT-P-67b	0.34	2.085	4.81010250	0.06505		transit	1000	1.642	6406	
HATS-36b	2.79±0.40	1.263±0.045	4.1752379±0.0000021	0.0529±0.0011	1363±40	transit	2860±70	1.135±0.067	5970±160	Host star also known as K2-145 Host star also known as K2-145
HATS-43b	0.261±0.054	1.180±0.050	4.3888497	0.04944±0.00046	1003±27	transit	1194.1±7.4	0.837±0.023	5099±61	
HATS-44b	0.56±0.11	1.067^{+0.125}_{−0.071}	2.7439004	0.03649±0.00030	1161±34	transit	1474±11	0.860±0.021	5080±100	
HATS-45b	0.70±0.15	1.286±0.093	4.1876244	0.05511±0.00069	1518±45	transit	2575±38	1.272±0.048	6450±110	
HATS-46b	0.173±0.062	0.903^{+0.058}_{−0.045}	4.7423729	0.05367±0.00053	1054±29	transit	1500±13	0.917±0.027	5495±69	
HATS-50b	0.39	1.130	3.8297015	0.05046		transit	2340	1.17	5990	
HATS-51b	0.768	1.41	3.3488702	0.04639	1553	transit	1560	1.17	5758	
HATS-52b	2.24	1.382	1.36665436	0.02498	1834	transit	2060	1.11	6010	
HATS-53b	0.595	1.340	3.8537768	0.04753	1312	transit	2000	0.96	5644	
HD 3167 d	0.0217		8.509	0.07757		radial vel.	149	0.86	5261	
HD 17674 b	0.87		623.8	1.42		radial vel.	145	0.98	5904	
HD 20781 d	0.0061^{+0.0012}_{−0.0011}	0.2052	5.3135±0.001	0.0529^{+0.0024}_{−0.0027}		radial vel.	115.36±4.4	0.7	5256±29	
HD 20781 e	0.0168^{+0.0022}_{−0.0021}	0.2183	13.8905^{+0.0033}_{−0.0034}	0.1004^{+0.0046}_{−0.0051}		radial vel.	115.36±4.4	0.7	5256±29	
HD 20794 e	0.0150		147.02	0.509		radial vel.	19.8	0.7	5401	
HD 27894 c	0.162		36.07	0.198		radial vel.	138.2	0.8	4875	
HD 27894 d	5.415		5174	5.448		radial vel.	138.2	0.8	4875	
HD 29021 b	2.4		1362.3	2.28		radial vel.	100	0.85	5560	
HD 40956 b	2.7		578.6	1.4		radial vel.	385	2.00	4869	
HD 42012 b	1.6		857.5	1.67		radial vel.	121	0.83	5405	
HD 45184 c	0.0277^{+0.0034}_{−0.0032}		13.1354^{+0.0026}_{−0.0025}	0.11^{+0.0034}_{−0.0036}		radial vel.	71.36±0.62	1.03	5869±14	
HD 76920 b	3.93		415.891^{+0.043}_{−0.039}	1.149		radial vel.	602.7	1.17	4698	Extremely eccentric orbit around an evolved red giant
HD 93385 Ab	0.0125±0.0015		7.3422±0.0014	0.0749±0.0017	1129±19	radial vel.	141.6±0.2	1.04±0.01	5823±35	Confirmed in 2021, renamed from HD 93385 d
HD 106315 b	0.0255	0.207	9.55804	0.0905	1046	transit	358	1.08	6277	Host star also known as K2-109
HD 106315 c	0.0560	0.385	21.05788	0.1533	804	transit	358	1.08	6277	Host star also known as K2-109
HD 111591 b	4.4		1056.4	2.5		radial vel.	352	1.94	4884	
HD 113996 b	6.3		610.2	1.6		radial vel.	331.4	1.49	4181	
HD 147379 b	0.0777		86.54	0.3193		radial vel.	35.01	0.58	4090	
HD 176986 b	0.0181		6.48980	0.06296		radial vel.	86.1	0.79	4931	
HD 176986 c	0.02888		16.8191	0.11878		radial vel.	86.1	0.79	4931	
HD 177565 b	0.04751		44.505	0.246		radial vel.	56	1.0		
HD 208897 b	1.40		352.7	1.05		radial vel.	211	1.25	4860	
HIP 65426 b	9.0±3.0	1.5±0.1	230,400	92	1500^{+100}_{−200}	imaging	363.3±12.3	1.96±0.05	8840±200	Gas giant orbiting the host star also known as HD 116434
K2-18c	0.0236		8.962	0.060	363	radial vel.	110	0.36	3547	
K2-105b	0.09439	0.369	8.266902	0.081		transit	760	1.01	5434	
K2-106b	0.0263	0.136	0.571292	0.0116	2333	transit	798	0.95	5470	Host star also known as EPIC 220674823
K2-106c		0.226	13.341245			transit	830	0.93	5590	Host star also known as EPIC 220674823
K2-108b	0.18689	0.471	4.73401	0.0573	1446	transit	1530	1.12	5474	
K2-111b	0.0271	0.17	5.35117	0.0621	1309	transit	680	0.88	5730	
K2-114b	1.85	0.942	11.39109	0.09309	719	transit	1570	0.83	5027	
K2-115b	0.84	1.115	20.273034	0.1367	682	transit	1360	0.83	5560	
K2-116b		0.062	4.655411	0.048		transit	183.1	0.69	4348	Host star also known as BD-12 6259
K2-117b		0.175	1.291505	0.019		transit	333.5	0.58	3842	
K2-117c		0.181	5.444820	0.051		transit	333.5	0.58	3842	
K2-118b		0.227	50.92092	0.245		transit	1057	0.76	4726	
K2-119b		0.204	7.728578	0.070		transit	1180	0.76	4753	
K2-120b		0.179	9.562742	0.078		transit	950	0.69	4350	
K2-121b		0.814	5.185754	0.052		transit	552	0.71	4471	
K2-122b		0.114	2.219405	0.029		transit	236	0.63	3993	
K2-123b		0.236	30.956763	0.167		transit	529	0.65	4076	
K2-124b		0.236	6.413539	0.051		transit	448	0.44	3561	
K2-125b		0.194	21.750264	0.121		transit	415	0.49	3654	
K2-126b		0.164	7.387073	0.066		transit	332	0.70	4368	
K2-127b		0.773	3.588165	0.041		transit	2370	0.70	4388	
K2-128b		0.127	5.675819	0.056		transit	373	0.71	4470	
K2-129b		0.0928	8.239493	0.057		transit	90.19±0.07	0.36	3459	Host star also known as LP 868-19
K2-130b		0.112	2.494120	0.032		transit	384.4±0.6	0.70	4356	
K2-131b	0.017	0.152	0.36931	0.009500	2062	transit	501	0.84	5245	
K2-132b		1.30	9.1751			transit	568	1.08±0.08	4840±90	
K2-133b		0.117	3.0712	0.033		transit	245.3±0.7	0.46±0.01	3655±80	Host star also known as LP 358–499, 4 planets in system
K2-133c		0.132	4.8682	0.045		transit	245.3±0.7	0.46±0.01	3655±80	Host star also known as LP 358–499, 4 planets in system
K2-133d		0.180	11.0234	0.077		transit	245.3±0.7	0.46±0.01	3655±80	Host star also known as LP 358–499, 4 planets in system
K2-135b		0.156	1.208957	0.020	1043.5	transit	98.8	0.66	4255	
K2-135c		0.121	3.64802	0.042	721.9	transit	98.8	0.66	4255	
K2-135d		0.187	6.20141	0.060	604.9	transit	98.8	0.66	4255	
K2-136b		0.0883	7.975292		553	transit		0.74	4499	
K2-136c	0.057±0.006	0.260	17.307137	0.11728	425	transit		0.74	4499	
K2-136d		0.129	25.575065		373	transit		0.74	4499	
K2-137b	0.5	0.079	0.179715	0.0058	1471	transit		0.46	3492	
K2-139b	0.387	0.808	28.38236	0.179	565	transit	496	1.8	5340	
K2-140b	0.211	1.093	6.56918	0.0687	957	transit	1110	1.00	5705	
K2-141b	0.0160±0.0013	0.135±0.004	0.2803226	0.00716^{+0.00055}_{−0.00065}	2039^{+87}_{−48}	transit	202.16±0.54	0.708±0.028	4599±79	
K2-146b		0.196±0.021	2.644646	0.0266±0.0010		transit	259.2±1.5	0.358±0.042	3385±70	
K2-147b		0.123^{+0.015}_{−0.013}	0.961917	0.0159±0.0005		transit	296.10±0.90	0.583±0.059	3672±70	Also called EPIC 213715787
K2-148b		0.119^{+0.017}_{−0.016}	4.38395±0.00080	0.0454±0.0014		transit	407.4±2.0	0.650±0.061	4079±70	
K2-148c		0.154^{+0.021}_{−0.019}	6.92260±0.00070	0.0616±0.0019		transit	407.4±2.0	0.650±0.061	4079±70	
K2-148d		0.146^{+0.021}_{−0.019}	9.7579±0.0010	0.0774±0.0024		transit	407.4±2.0	0.650±0.061	4079±70	
K2-149b		0.146^{+0.018}_{−0.016}	11.3320±0.0013	0.0830±0.0027		transit	404.8±1.8	0.595±0.059	3745±70	
K2-150b		0.178^{+0.024}_{−0.019}	10.59357±0.00084	0.0727±0.0027		transit	335.2±2.6	0.457±0.051	3499±70	
K2-151b		0.120^{+0.014}_{−0.012}	3.835592	0.0365±0.0014		transit	227.07±0.49	0.440±0.050	3585±70	
K2-152b		0.204^{+0.022}_{−0.021}	32.6527±0.0035	0.1716±0.0012	337±3	transit	354.8±1.3	0.63±0.01	4044^{+34}_{−35}	
K2-153b		0.178^{+0.019}_{−0.016}	7.51554	0.0614±0.0004	497±6	transit	468.7±3.0	0.55±0.01	3845±37	
K2-154b		0.178^{+0.019}_{−0.010}	3.67635	0.0405±0.0003	715^{+9}_{−8}	transit	423.5±1.5	0.65^{+0.02}_{−0.01}	4097^{+40}_{−45}	
K2-154c		0.185^{+0.016}_{−0.012}	7.95478	0.0677±0.0005	552±7	transit	423.5±1.5	0.65^{+0.02}_{−0.01}	4097^{+40}_{−45}	
KELT-9b	2.88	1.891	1.4811235	0.03462	4050	transit	615.5	2.52	10170	Hottest confirmed exoplanet
KELT-18b	1.18	1.570	2.8717518	0.04550	2085	transit		1.52	6670	
KELT-19Ab	<4.07	1.91	4.6117093	0.0637	1935	transit	950	1.62	7500	
KELT-20b		1.741	3.4741085	0.0542	2262	transit	455.6	1.76	8720	Also known as MASCARA-2b
KELT-21b	3.91^{+0}_{−3.91}	1.586^{+0.039}_{−0.040}	3.6127647	0.05224^{+0.00035}_{−0.00034}	2051^{+29}_{−30}	transit	1557±21	1.458^{+0.029}_{−0.028}	7598^{+81}_{−84}	
Kepler-19d	0.0708		62.95			radial vel.	6910	0.94	5541	
Kepler-80g		0.101	14.64558		418	transit	1160	0.73	4540	
Kepler-90i		0.118	14.44912		709	transit	2540	1.2	6080	
Kepler-150 f		0.325	637.2093	1.24		transit	2980±50		5560	
Kepler-1649b		0.0964	8.689090	0.0514		transit		0.22	3240	
Kepler-1650b		0.0856	1.53818001			transit	393	0.33	3410	
Kepler-1651b		0.164	9.87863917			transit	226	0.52	3713	
Kepler-1652b		0.143	38.09722	0.1654	268	transit	822	0.40	3638	
Kepler-1653b		0.194	140.2524	0.4706	284	transit	2460	0.72	4807	
LHS 1140 b	0.0209	0.128	24.73712	0.0875	254	transit	40.7	0.18	3216	Potentially habitable exoplanet
MASCARA-1b	3.7	1.5	2.148780	0.043	2570	transit	615.5	1.72	7554	
MOA-2010-BLG-117Lb	0.54±0.10		2369^{+835}_{−2717}	2.9^{+1.6}_{−0.6}		microlensing	11400±1300	0.58±0.11	4000^{+450}_{−350}	
MOA-2012-BLG-006Lb	8.40			10.2		microlensing	17000	0.49		
MOA-2012-BLG-505Lb	0.02108			0.900		microlensing	23500	0.10		
MOA-2016-BLG-227Lb	2.8			1.67		microlensing	21000	0.29		
MXB 1658-298 b	23.7		760	1.613		timing		1.98		Circumbinary planet
NGTS-1b	0.812	1.33	2.647298	0.0326	790	transit	731	0.617	3916	Largest exoplanet in relation to its star
OGLE-2013-BLG-0132Lb	0.29			3.6		microlensing	13000	0.54		
OGLE-2013-BLG-1721Lb	0.64			2.6		microlensing	21000	0.46		
OGLE-2013-BLG-1761Lb	2.7^{+2.5}_{−1.5}			1.8±0.5		microlensing	23000^{+3300}_{−3900}	0.33^{+0.32}_{−0.19}		
OGLE-2016-BLG-0263Lb	4.10			5.4		microlensing	21000	0.13		
OGLE-2016-BLG-0613(AB)b	4.18			6.40		microlensing	11100	0.72		
OGLE-2016-BLG-1190Lb	13.38		1224	2.17		microlensing	22100	0.88		Extremely massive; possible brown dwarf
OGLE-2016-BLG-1195Lb	0.031			2.62±0.28		microlensing	22000±2000	0.57±0.06		
OGLE-2017-BLG-0173Lb	0.0103^{+0.0121}_{−0.0063}		4493^{+3090}_{−7055}	3.9±1.6		microlensing	15700^{+4900}_{−5900}	0.40^{+0.39}_{−0.23}	3500^{+1500}_{−500}	Atypical lensing event
PSR J2322-2650 b	0.7949		0.322963997	0.0102		timing	750	1.4		
Qatar-6b	0.668	1.062	3.506195	0.0423		transit	330	0.822	5052	
Ross 128 b	0.00440		9.8658	0.0496	301	radial vel.	11.03	0.17	3192	
SAND978 b	2.18		511.21			radial vel.	2051.3	1.37	4200	Red giant host star, belonging to M67, is also known as NGC 2682 108
TAP 26 b	1.66		10.79	0.0968		radial vel.	480	1.04	4620	Host star also known as V1069 Tauri
Tau Ceti g	0.00551		20.00	0.133		radial vel.	12	0.78		
Tau Ceti h	0.00576		49.41	0.243		radial vel.	12	0.78		
TRAPPIST-1e	0.00195	0.082	6.099615	0.02817	251	transit	39	0.08	2559	Potentially habitable exoplanet
TRAPPIST-1f	0.00214	0.093	9.20669	0.0371	219	transit	39	0.08	2559	Potentially habitable exoplanet
TRAPPIST-1g	0.00422	0.101	12.35294	0.0451	199	transit	39	0.08	2559	Potentially habitable exoplanet
TRAPPIST-1h		0.067	20	0.063	168	transit	39	0.08	2559	
TYC 4282-605-1 b	10.78		101.54	0.422		radial vel.	2300	0.97	4300	
WASP-91b	1.34	1.03	2.798581	0.037	1160	transit	490	0.84	4920	
WASP-105b	1.8	0.96	7.87288	0.075	900	transit		0.89	5070	
WASP-107b	0.12	0.94	5.721490	0.055	770	transit		0.69	4430	
WASP-151b	0.31	1.13	4.533471	0.055	1290	transit	1570	1.01	5871	Host star also known as K2-134
WASP-153b	0.39	1.55	3.332609	0.048	1700	transit	1400	1.34	5914	
WASP-156b	0.128	0.51	3.836169	0.0453	970	transit	460	0.84	4910	Host star also known as TOI-465
WASP-167b		1.58	2.0219596	0.0365	2329	transit	1240	1.59	7000	Host star also known as KELT-13
YZ Ceti b	0.0024		1.96876	0.01634^{+0.00035}_{−0.00041}		radial vel.	12.122±0.002	0.130±0.013	3056±60	
YZ Ceti c	0.00308		3.06008	0.02156^{+0.00046}_{−0.00054}		radial vel.	12.122±0.002	0.130±0.013	3056±60	
YZ Ceti d	0.00359		4.65627	0.02851^{+0.00061}_{−0.00071}		radial vel.	12.122±0.002	0.130±0.013	3056±60	

== Specific exoplanet lists ==
Lists of exoplanets

- List of directly imaged exoplanets
- List of exoplanet extremes
- List of exoplanet firsts
- List of exoplanets discovered by the Kepler space telescope
- List of exoplanets observed during Kepler's K2 mission
- List of exoplanets discovered by the TESS mission
- List of terrestrial exoplanet candidates for atmosphere detection
- List of hottest exoplanets
- List of coldest exoplanets
- List of multiplanetary systems
- List of circumbinary planets
- List of nearest exoplanets
- List of nearest terrestrial exoplanet candidates
- List of potentially habitable exoplanets
- List of proper names of exoplanets
- List of largest exoplanets
- List of smallest exoplanets
- List of transiting exoplanets
- List of exoplanets and planetary debris around giant stars
- List of exoplanets and planetary debris around white dwarfs
- List of extrasolar planetary collisions

=== Lists of exoplanets by year of discovery ===
- List of exoplanets discovered before 2000 (31)
- List of exoplanets discovered between 2000–2009 (376)
- List of exoplanets discovered in 2010 (109)
- List of exoplanets discovered in 2011 (178)
- List of exoplanets discovered in 2012 (149)
- List of exoplanets discovered in 2013 (149)
- List of exoplanets discovered in 2014 (869)
- List of exoplanets discovered in 2015 (144)
- List of exoplanets discovered in 2016 (1497)
- List of exoplanets discovered in 2017 (152)
- List of exoplanets discovered in 2018 (300)
- List of exoplanets discovered in 2019 (169)
- List of exoplanets discovered in 2020 (256)
- List of exoplanets discovered in 2021 (253)
- List of exoplanets discovered in 2022 (312)
- List of exoplanets discovered in 2023 (304)
- List of exoplanets discovered in 2024 (284)
- List of exoplanets discovered in 2025 (239)
- List of exoplanets discovered in 2026 (351)
