= K2-24b =

Exoplanet in the constellation Scorpius

Discovery
- Discovered by: PETIGURA E., HOWARD A., LOPEZ E., DECK K., FULTON B. et al.
- Discovery site: Kepler Space Observatory
- Discovery date: Nov. 17, 2015
- Detection method: Transit

Orbital characteristics
- Semi-major axis: 0.0775 AU (11,590,000 km)
- Eccentricity: 0
- Orbital period (sidereal): 20.8851 (± 0.0003) d
- Star: K2-24

Physical characteristics
- Mean radius: 0.507 (± 0.05) R_{J} 5.577±0.55 R_{🜨}
- Mass: 0.0661 (± 0.017) M_{J} (22.34±5.4 M_{🜨})
- Mean density: 0.7103 g/cm^{3} (0.02566 lb/cu in)
- Temperature: 767 K (494 °C; 921 °F)

K2-24b also known as EPIC 203771098 b is an exoplanet orbiting the Sun-like star K2-24 every 21 days. It has about the same density as Saturn, at 0.7103 g/cm^{3}, which indicates that the planet is clearly a gas giant.
