= K2-24c =

Gas giant exoplanet

Discovery
- Discovered by: PETIGURA E., HOWARD A., LOPEZ E., DECK K., FULTON B. et al.
- Discovery site: Kepler Space Observatory
- Discovery date: Nov. 17, 2015
- Detection method: Transit

Orbital characteristics
- Semi-major axis: 0.247 (± 0.004) AU
- Eccentricity: 0
- Orbital period (sidereal): 42.3633 (± 0.0006) d
- Inclination: 89.76 (± 0.2)
- Star: K2-24

Physical characteristics
- Mean radius: 7.82 ± 0.72 R_{🜨}
- Mass: 27.0 ± 6.9 M_{🜨}
- Mean density: 0.31 ± 0.12 g/cm^{3}
- Temperature: 606.0 K (332.9 °C)

K2-24c also known as EPIC 203771098 c is an exoplanet orbiting the Sun-like star K2-24 every 42 days. It has a density far lower than that of Saturn, which indicates that the planet is clearly a gas giant.
