= Kepler-1649c =

Earth-size exoplanet orbiting Kepler-1649

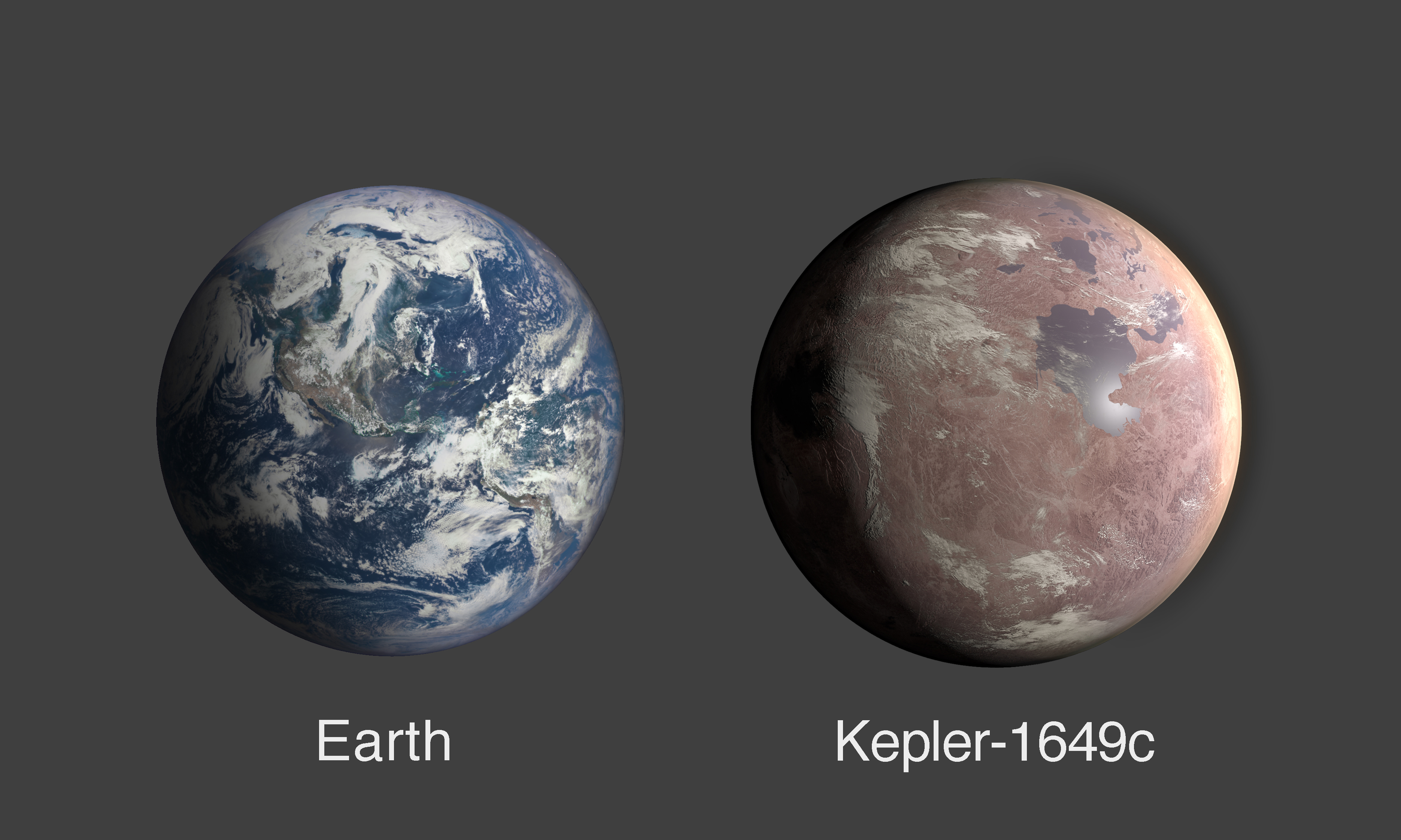
- Size comparison of Earth and Kepler-1649c (artist's impression)

Discovery
- Discovered by: Kepler spacecraft
- Discovery date: 15 April 2020
- Detection method: Transit

Orbital characteristics
- Semi-major axis: 0.0649 AU
- Orbital period (sidereal): 19.5352551±0.0001018 d
- Inclination: 89.65
- Star: Kepler-1649

Physical characteristics
- Mean radius: 1.06^{+0.15}_{−0.10} R_{🜨}
- Mass: 1.2 M_{🜨}
- Mean density: 5.54 g/cm^{3}
- Temperature: T_{eq}: 234 K (−39 °C; −38 °F)

Kepler-1649c is an Earth-sized exoplanet, likely rocky, orbiting within the habitable zone of the red dwarf star Kepler-1649, the outermost planet of the planetary system discovered by Kepler’s space telescope. It is located about 301 light-years (92 pc) away from Earth, in the constellation of Cygnus.

Kepler-1649c orbits its star a distance of 0.0649 AU (9.71 million km; 6.03 million mi) from its host star with an orbital period of roughly 19.53 days, has a mass 1.2x times that of Earth, and has a radius of around 1.02 times that of Earth. Based on its mass and radius, it is likely a terrestrial planet, though its proximity to its star means it may likely be tidally locked. Kepler-1649c is estimated to receive about three-quarters of radiation from its host star as Earth does from the Sun.

In 2017, Jeff Coughlin, the director of SETI's K2 Science Office, described it as the most "similar planet to Earth" found so far by the Kepler Space Telescope. The planet was initially deemed a false positive by Kepler's robovetter algorithm. The Kepler False Positive Working Group published its recovery on April 15, 2020. Its first scientific description was published in The Astrophysical Journal Letters, with first author Andrew Vanderburg, in April 2020.

== Physical characteristics ==
=== Mass, radius and temperature ===
The exoplanet was identified as a rocky planet by NASA and is very similar to Earth in terms of size, with a radius 1.06 times that of Earth.

=== Host star ===
Kepler-1649 is a type-M red dwarf star estimated to be roughly ¼ the radius of the Sun with only two confirmed planets in its orbit, the other being Kepler-1649b. Kepler-1649b is similar to Venus from our own solar system in two ways: both Kepler-1649b and Venus have orbits roughly half the radius of the next known planets (Kepler-1649c and Earth respectively), and they are of similar size.

=== Orbit ===
Kepler-1649c takes only 19.5 Earth days to orbit its host star Kepler-1649, an M-Type red dwarf. It orbits within the habitable zone of its star system, Kepler-1649.

== Habitability ==
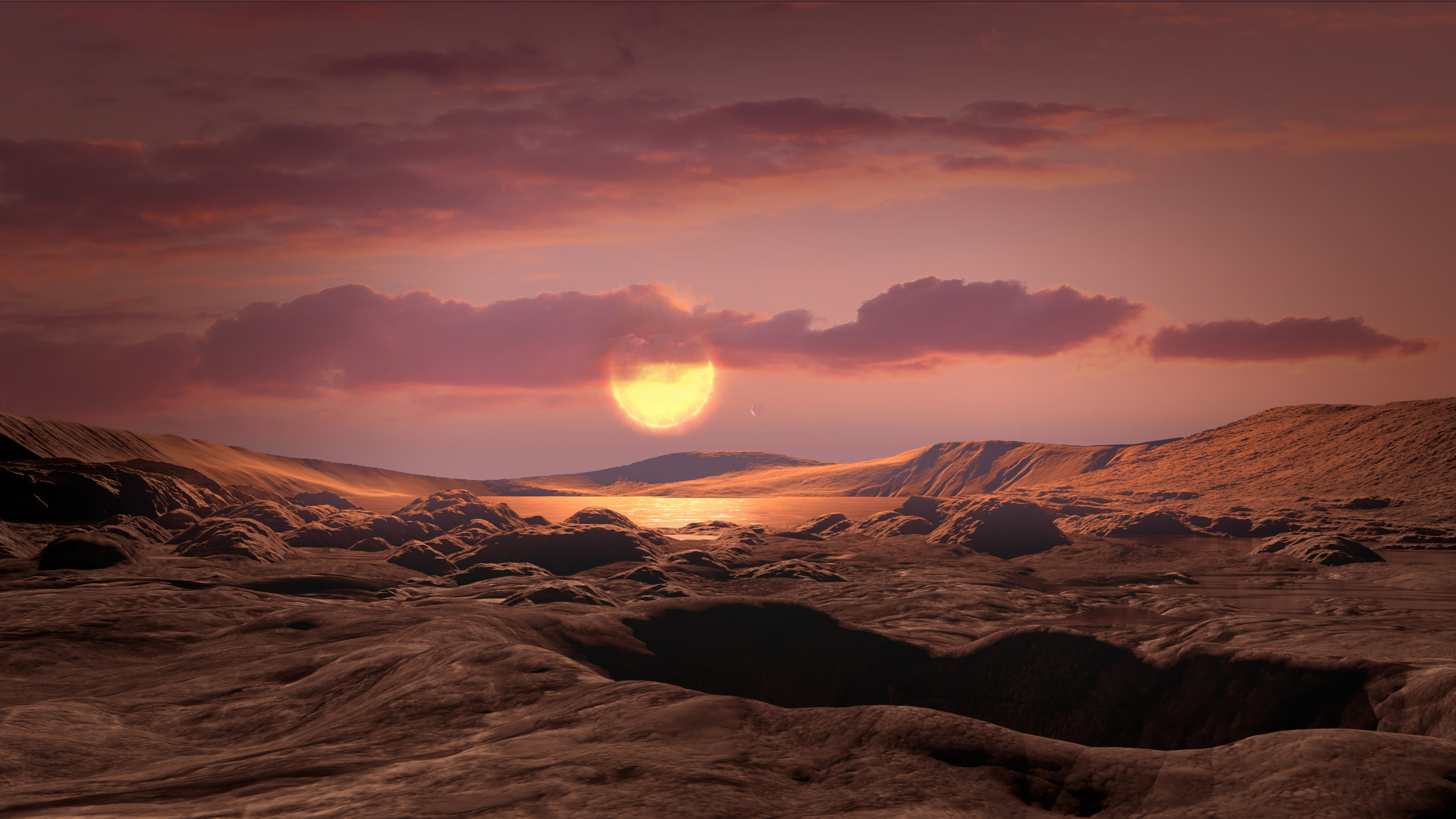
Artist's impression of the surface of Kepler-1649c with host star and Kepler-1649b in the sky

While the exoplanet does orbit within its star's habitable zone, due to the lack of information on the exoplanet's atmosphere, it is unclear if Kepler-1649c can sustain liquid water on its surface. As of 2021, no solar flare-ups have yet been observed from the host star; nonetheless, scientists believe that such stars are prone to frequent solar flare activity, and that such flares may have stripped the exoplanet's atmosphere and hindered the prospect of life.

=== Climate ===
Very little is known of Kepler-1649c's climate. It receives 75% of the light from its host star that Earth receives from the Sun; therefore, depending on the atmosphere, its surface temperature may be similar enough to the temperature of the Earth that liquid water may be present. It is unclear what the composition of Kepler-1649c's atmosphere is.

Orbital evolution models show that significant oscillations of eccentricity are likely under the mutual gravitational influence of Kepler 1649c, Kepler 1649b, and a postulated intermediate planet, but the climate would remain Earth-like for most initial parameters.

== See also ==
- Kepler-62f
- Kepler-186f
- Kepler-442b
- LHS 1140 b
- List of potentially habitable exoplanets
- Proxima Centauri b
- TRAPPIST-1 e
- Habitability of red dwarf systems
- Earth analog
