= K2-146b =

Hot Neptune

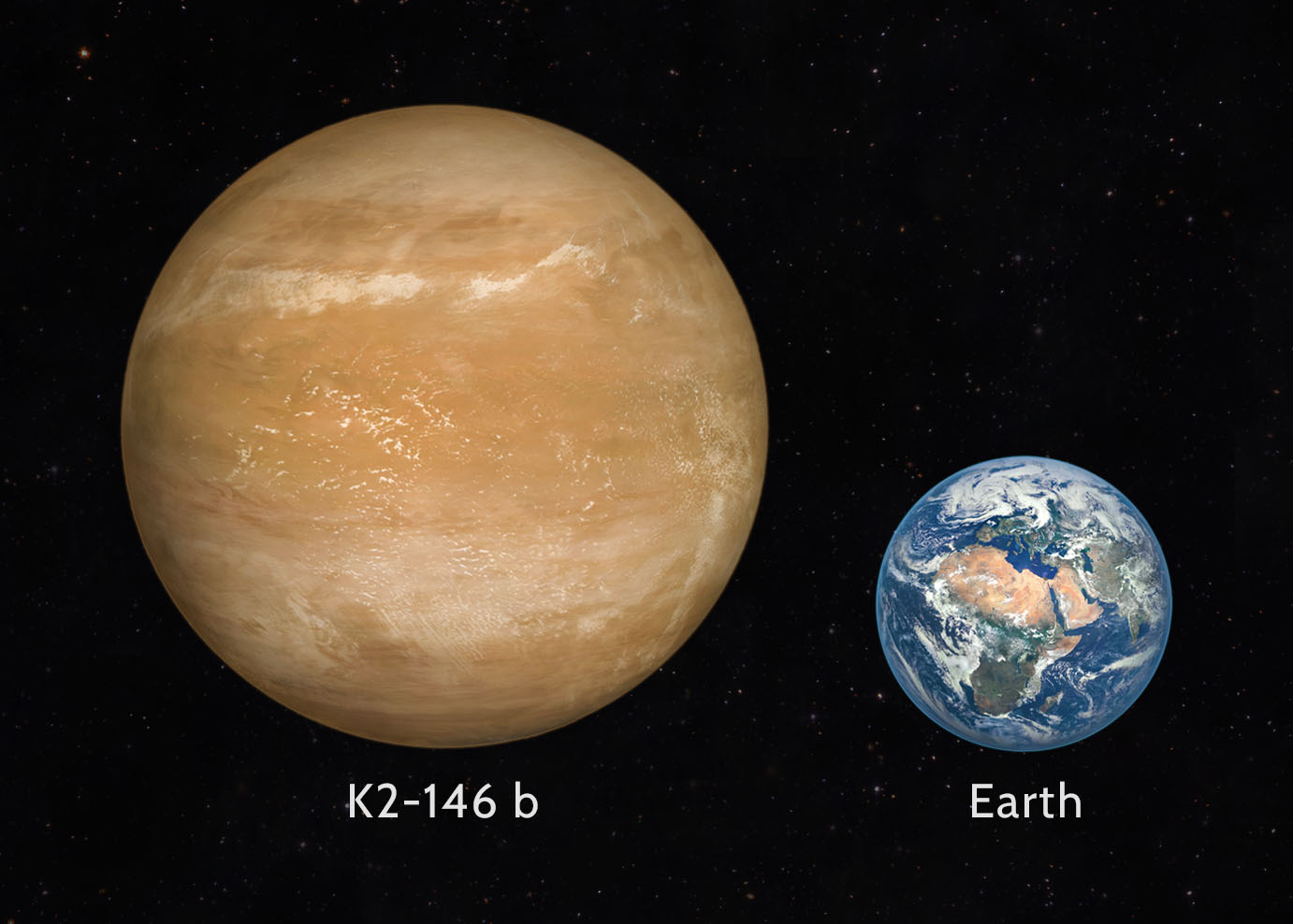
- Size comparison of the planet K2-146b (artistic concept) with Earth

Discovery
- Discovery site: Kepler Space Observatory
- Detection method: Transit

Orbital characteristics
- Star: K2-146

K2-146b is a Neptune-like exoplanet discovered in 2018 by the Kepler Space Telescope that orbits a low-mass M-type star in the constellation Cancer. Its host star, K2-146, is orbited by another planet named K2-146c. The planet orbits K2-146 at a distance of 0.0248 AU (3,710,000 km), fifteen times closer than Mercury is to the Sun (0.3871 AU). Thus, it orbits very rapidly, with one year lasting just 2.64 days (63 hours), and is far too hot to be habitable, with an equilibrium temperature of 534 K (261 °C; 502 °F).
