= HD 176986 =

K-type star with a multi-planet system

Observation data Epoch J2000.0 Equinox J2000.0
- Constellation: Aquila
- Right ascension: 19^{h} 03^{m} 05.87296^{s}
- Declination: −11° 02′ 38.1308″
- Apparent magnitude (V): 8.45±0.01

Characteristics
- Evolutionary stage: Main-sequence
- Spectral type: K2.5V
- Apparent magnitude (G): 8.15

Astrometry
Radial velocity (R_{v})	37.42±0.14 km/s
Proper motion (μ)	RA: −126.947(23) mas/yr Dec.: −235.938(19) mas/yr
Parallax (π)	35.8579±0.0221 mas
Distance	90.96 ± 0.06 ly (27.89 ± 0.02 pc)
Absolute magnitude (M_{V})	+6.31

Details
Mass	0.789±0.019 M_{☉}
Radius	0.782±0.035 R_{☉}
Luminosity	0.331±0.027 L_{☉}
Surface gravity (log g)	4.44±0.17 cgs
Temperature	4931±77 K
Metallicity [Fe/H]	0.03±0.05 dex
Rotation	35.9±0.2d
Age	4.3±4.0 Gyr

Other designations
- BD−11°4849, HD 176986, HIP 93540, SAO 162137, PPM 235422, LTT 7548, NLTT 47342, TIC 39554091, TYC 5711-1098-1, 2MASS J19030587−1102379

Database references
SIMBAD	data
Exoplanet Archive	data

HD 176986 is an K-type main-sequence star located approximately 91 light-years (27.9 parsecs) from the Sun in the constellation of Aquila. It hosts a system of three confirmed exoplanets, all Super-Earths or Mini-Neptunes detected by the radial velocity method. The system was first identified with two planets in 2018 as part of the RoPES (Radial velocity Planets around Evolved Stars) project using HARPS and HARPS-N spectrographs, with a third planet announced in early 2026.

== Planetary system ==
The system's first two planets (HD 176986 b and c) were reported by the RoPES project using HARPS and HARPS-N radial-velocity data. A third planet, HD 176986 d, was later reported in follow-up analysis of the system.

The HD 176986 planetary system
Companion (in order from star)	Mass	Semimajor axis (AU)	Orbital period (days)	Eccentricity	Inclination	Radius
b	≥5.36±0.44 M_{🜨}	0.062956±0.00053	6.49164+0.00030 −0.00029	—	—	—
c	≥9.75+0.65 −0.64 M_{🜨}	0.11873±0.0010	16.8124±0.0015	—	—	—
d	≥6.76+0.91 −0.92 M_{🜨}	0.28149±0.0024	61.376+0.051 −0.049	—	—	—

=== Discovery and observations ===
HD 176986 was monitored within the RoPES radial-velocity programme targeting nearby G- and K-type stars, which combines precision Doppler measurements from the HARPS and HARPS-N spectrographs to search for low-mass, short-period planets. HARPS is a fibre-fed, high-resolution echelle spectrograph mounted on the ESO 3.6-m telescope at La Silla Observatory (Chile) and was designed for long-term radial-velocity stability at the ~1 m/s level.

In the RoPES analyses of HD 176986, combined radial-velocity time series with stellar activity diagnostics and statistical modelling to distinguish planetary signals from activity-related variability, reporting two super-Earths (HD 176986 b and c) and later a third planet (HD 176986 d).
