= Kepler-1649b =

Venus-like exoplanet orbiting Kepler-1649

Discovery
- Discovered by: Kepler spacecraft
- Discovery date: 2017
- Detection method: Transit

Designations
- Alternative names: KOI-3138.01

Orbital characteristics
- Semi-major axis: 0.0514 ± 0.0028 AU
- Orbital period (sidereal): 8.689099 ± 0.000025 d
- Inclination: 89.150
- Star: Kepler-1649

Physical characteristics
- Mean radius: 1.017 ± 0.051 R_{🜨}
- Mass: 1.03 M_{🜨}

Kepler-1649b is an exoplanet orbiting the red dwarf star Kepler-1649, discovered in 2017. It is similar to Venus, but in the past it was thought to be a candidate for habitability.

== Host star ==
Kepler-1649 is a type-M red dwarf star estimated to be roughly ¼ the radius of the Sun with only two confirmed planets in its orbit, the other being Kepler-1649c. Kepler-1649c is similar to Earth from our own solar system in two ways: both Kepler-1649c and Earth have orbits roughly twice the radius of the previous known planets (Kepler-1649b and Venus respectively), and they are of similar size.

=== Orbit ===
Kepler-1649b takes only 8.6 Earth days to orbit Kepler-1649.

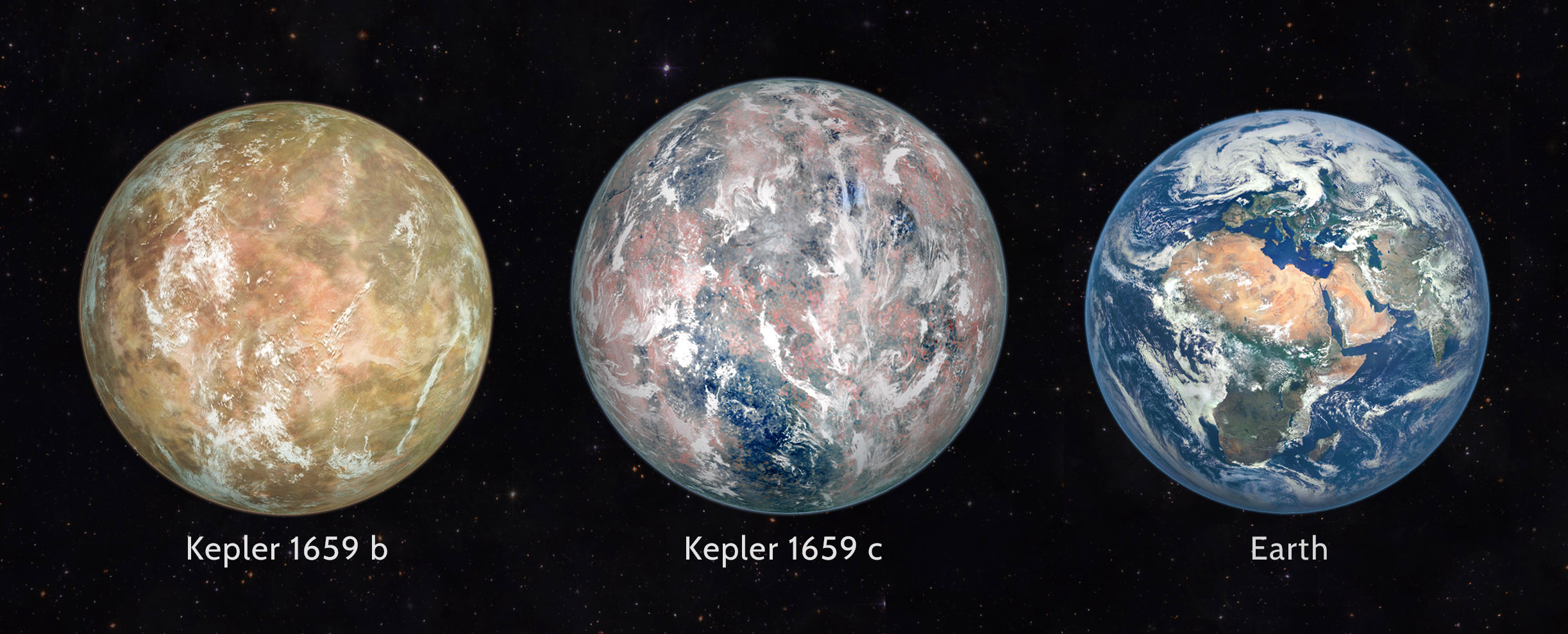
Artist's impression and size comparison of the two planets in the Kepler-1649 system with Earth
