= BD+03 2562 =

Low-metallicity star

Observation data Epoch J2000 Equinox J2000
- Constellation: Virgo
- Right ascension: 11^{h} 50^{m} 15.5527^{s}
- Declination: +02° 45′ 36.472″
- Apparent magnitude (V): 9.58

Characteristics
- Spectral type: K2
- B−V color index: 1.27

Astrometry
Radial velocity (R_{v})	50.88 ± 0.06 km/s
Distance	8539 ± 1840 ly (2618 ± 564 pc)
Absolute magnitude (M_{V})	−2.51

Details
Mass	1.14 ± 0.25 M_{☉}
Radius	32.35 ± 8.82 R_{☉}
Luminosity	501 L_{☉}
Surface gravity (log g)	1.89 ± 0.10 cgs
Temperature	4095 ± 20 K
Metallicity [Fe/H]	−0.71 ± 0.09 dex
Rotational velocity (v sin i)	2.7 ± 0.3 km/s
Age	5.25 Gyr

Other designations
- TYC 276-507-1, 2MASS J11501555+0245365

Database references
SIMBAD	data

BD+03 2562 is a very-low-metallicity star in the constellation of Virgo. It is located about 8,500 light-years (2,600 parsecs) from Earth.

== Planetary system ==
The star is orbited by a superjovian exoplanet, BD+03 2562 b, which was discovered in 2017 by a radial velocity method.

The planetary system
Companion (in order from star)	Mass	Semimajor axis (AU)	Orbital period (days)	Eccentricity	Inclination	Radius
b	>6.4±1.3 M_{J}	1.3±0.1	481.9^{+2.7}_{−2.8}	0.20^{+0.12}_{−0.08}	—	—
