= HD 184010 =

Subgiant star in the constellation Vulpecula

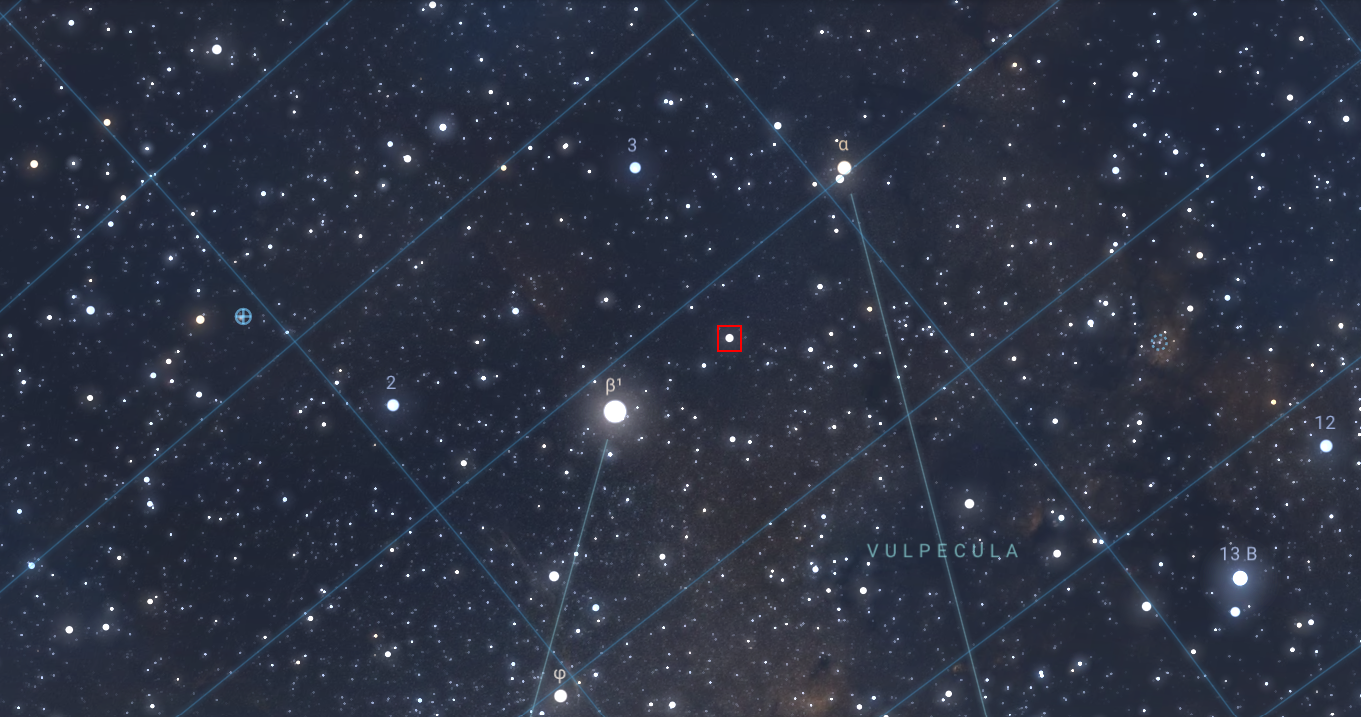
- Location of HD 184010 in the night sky. The star is marked within the red square.

Observation data Epoch J2000 Equinox ICRS
- Constellation: Vulpecula
- Right ascension: 19^{h} 31^{m} 21.62^{s}
- Declination: +26° 37′ 01.8″
- Apparent magnitude (V): 5.89

Characteristics
- Evolutionary stage: red giant branch
- Spectral type: K0 III-IV

Astrometry
| Radial velocity (R_{v}) | 5.73±0.12 km/s |
| Proper motion (μ) | RA: 10.965 mas/yr Dec.: 25.121 mas/yr |
| Parallax (π) | 16.2940±0.0301 mas |
| Distance | 200.2 ± 0.4 ly (61.4 ± 0.1 pc) |
| Absolute magnitude (M_{V}) | +1.98 |

Details
| Mass | 1.35+0.19 −0.21 M_{☉} |
| Radius | 4.86+0.55 −0.49 R_{☉} |
| Luminosity | 13.09+3.15 −2.65 L_{☉} |
| Surface gravity (log g) | 3.18+0.08 −0.07 cgs |
| Temperature | 4,987±10 K |
| Metallicity [Fe/H] | −0.17±0.10 dex |
| Rotational velocity (v sin i) | 1.34 km/s |
| Age | 2.76+2.24 −0.95 Gyr |

Other designations
- HIP 96016, HR 7421, TYC 2133-2965-1, GSC 02133-02965, 2MASS J19312163+2637018

Database references
| SIMBAD | data |
| Exoplanet Archive | data |

HD 184010 is a single evolved star in the constellation of Vulpecula. Its surface temperature is 4,987±10 K. HD 184010 has an orange/red hue and is visible to the naked eye with an apparent visual magnitude of 5.89. Based upon parallax measurements, it is located 200 light-years in distance from the Sun. The object is drifting further away from the Sun with a radial velocity of +5.73±0.12 km/s.

== Planetary system ==
In 2022, three planets orbiting HD 184010 were discovered by the radial velocity method.

None of these three planets orbit in the habitable zone and all are believed to be gas giants. Stability analysis suggests the planets' masses could be almost twice as large as the minimum masses and still be dynamically stable.

HD 184010 (Note: The preferred model assumes circular orbits.)
| Companion | Minimum mass (M_{J}) | Maximum mass (M_{J}) | Semi-major axis (AU) | Orbital period (days) | Eccentricity | Inclination | Radius (R_{⊕}) |
|---|---|---|---|---|---|---|---|
| b | ≥0.31+0.03 −0.04 | 0.604 | 0.940+0.005 −0.001 | 286.6+2.4 −0.7 | 0 | | |
| c | ≥0.30+0.03 −0.06 | 0.597 | 1.334+0.013 −0.005 | 484.3+5.5 −3.5 | 0 | | |
| d | ≥0.45+0.04 −0.06 | 0.880 | 1.920±0.012 | 836.4±8.4 | 0 | | |

== See also ==
- List of exoplanets discovered in 2022
