= K2-24 =

G-type main sequence star more massive than the Sun

Observation data Epoch J2000 Equinox J2000
- Constellation: Scorpius
- Right ascension: 16^{h} 10^{m} 17.6977^{s}
- Declination: −24° 59′ 25.261″
- Apparent magnitude (V): 11.068±0.110

Characteristics
- Evolutionary stage: subgiant
- Spectral type: G3
- Apparent magnitude (J): 9.635±0.024
- Apparent magnitude (H): 9.294±0.022
- Apparent magnitude (K): 9.180±0.021
- Variable type: Planetary transit

Astrometry
Radial velocity (R_{v})	1.18±0.32 km/s
Proper motion (μ)	RA: −59.891±0.021 mas/yr Dec.: −58.702±0.014 mas/yr
Parallax (π)	5.8273±0.0169 mas
Distance	560 ± 2 ly (171.6 ± 0.5 pc)

Details
Mass	1.041+0.017 −0.016 M_{☉}
Radius	1.185±0.011 R_{☉}
Surface gravity (log g)	4.48±0.03 cgs
Temperature	5726±65 K
Metallicity [Fe/H]	0.41±0.05 dex
Age	4.9±1.7 Gyr

Other designations
- EPIC 203771098, TYC 6784-837-1, 2MASS J16101770-2459251, Gaia DR2 6049750234317822208

Database references
SIMBAD	data
Exoplanet Archive	data

K2-24 (also known as EPIC 203771098) is a metal-rich G3-type star larger and more massive than the Sun, located 560 light-years (172 parsecs) away in the constellation Scorpius. Two confirmed transiting exoplanets are known to orbit this star. An attempt to detect stellar companions using adaptive optics imaging at the Keck telescope was negative however later observations using lucky imaging at the Danish 1.54 m telescope at La Silla Observatory detected a possible companion at 3.8 arcseconds distance from K2-24. This candidate companion being over 8 magnitudes fainter than K2-24 and with a color temperature of 5400 Kelvin, is inconsistent with a bound main sequence companion.

== Planetary system ==
=== Discovery ===
Erik A. Petigura and team analyzed data obtained from the Kepler space telescope during its observation of the K2 Campaign 2 field. They reported the discovery and confirmation of both planets b and c. The Planetary signals were independently detected by Andrew Vanderburg and collaborators.

=== Characteristics ===
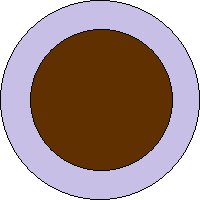
The possible make up of K2-24 b and c, consisting of a hydrogen/helium atmosphere (purple) and a rocky core (brown)

The two known planets in this system have radii equal to 5.4 and 7.5 times that of the Earth. This places both planets radii between that of Uranus and Saturn, a range not present within the Solar System. With orbital periods of 20.9 days and 42.4 days, the planets are within 1% of the 2:1 mean-motion resonance. The low observed eccentricities and near orbital resonance provide evidence regarding the formation and evolution of the system, suggesting that they could possibly have resulted from gravitational interactions with a protoplanetary disk. K2-24c at 15.4 earth masses is significantly lighter than K2-24b's 19 Earth masses despite being a larger planet. It is estimated that K2-24b's atmosphere makes up 26% of its mass while K2-24c's atmosphere makes up 52%. The current model of core-nucleated accretion predicts that runaway accretion should occur when a planet reaches approximately 50% atmosphere by mass, this makes K2-24c a potential challenge to the model.

There is also a candidate planet, K2-24d, with a mass of 53 M_{🜨} and an orbital period of 470 days. While the radial velocity signal of planet was confirmed, no validation tests were run to confirm its existence, rendering it as unconfirmed.

A transit observation of K2-24b with the Hubble Space Telescope's Wide Field Camera 3 suggested the presence of ammonia, in a high abundance, but did not find evidence for water.

The K2-24 planetary system
Companion (in order from star)	Mass	Semimajor axis (AU)	Orbital period (days)	Eccentricity	Inclination	Radius
b	19.0+2.2 −2.1 M_{🜨}	0.1673+0.0034 −0.0056	20.88977+0.00034 −0.00035	0.06±0.01	89.63±0.25°	5.638+0.065 −0.061 R_{🜨}
c	16.4+1.3 −0.2 M_{🜨}	0.262+0.014 −0.011	42.3391±0.0012	<0.05	89.44+0.15 −0.11°	7.93+0.12 −0.13 R_{🜨}
d (unconfirmed)	53+9 −4 M_{🜨}	—	469+10 −15	0.00	—	—

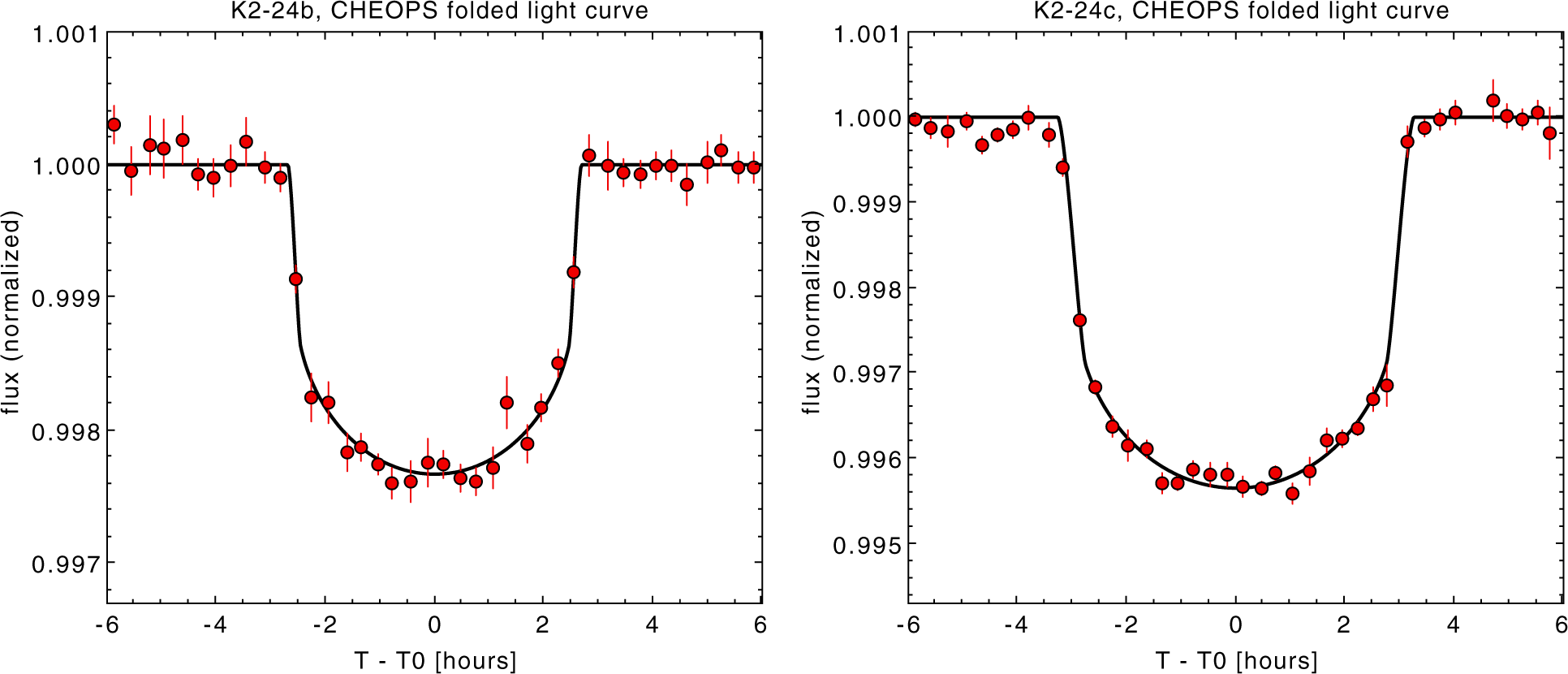
Folded transit light curves of K2-24b (left panel) and K2-24c (right panel) obtained using the CHEOPS space telescope.
