= Kepler-1649 =

Red dwarf star with two exoplanets

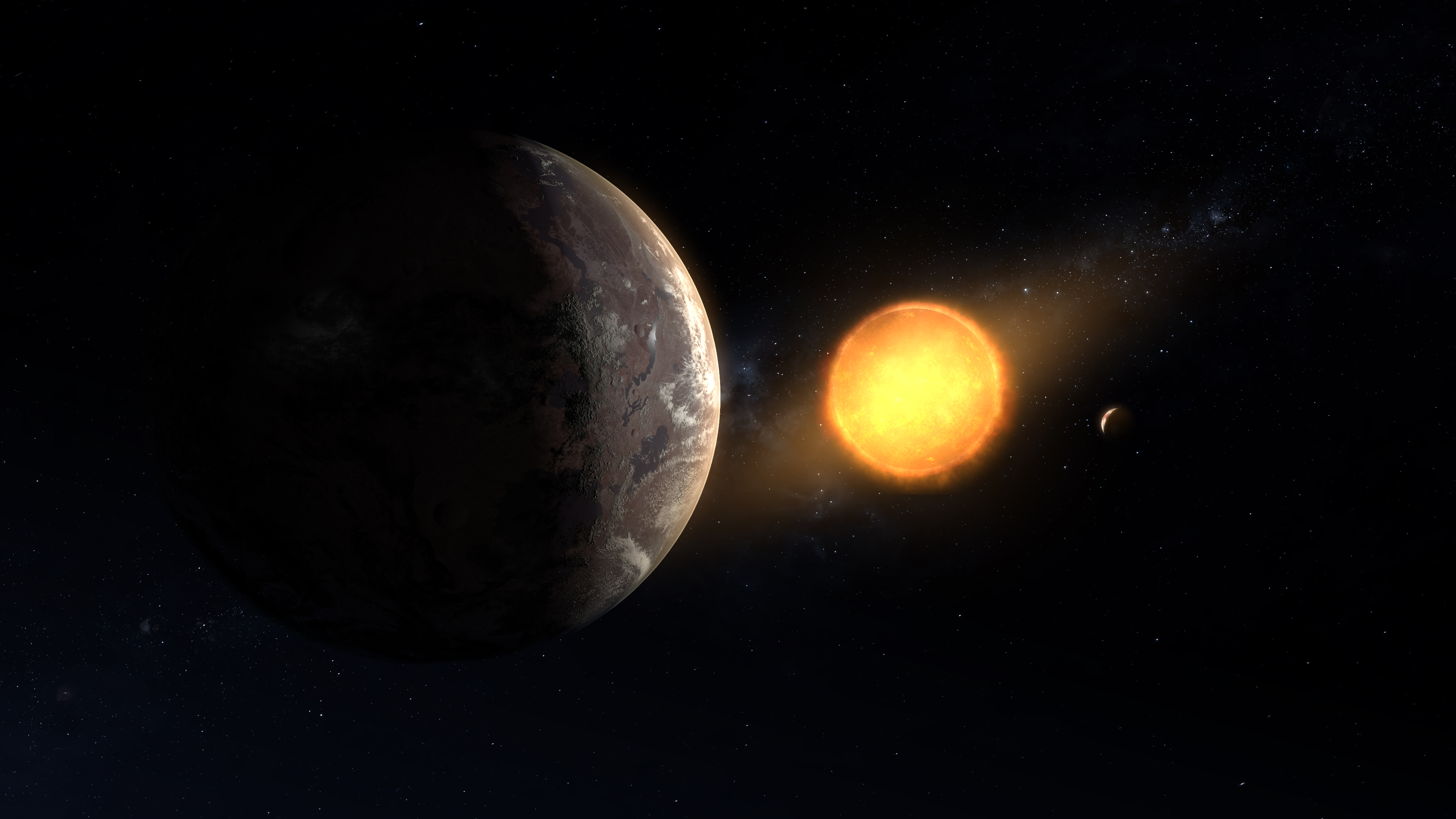
- Artist's impression of exoplanet Kepler-1649c with its host star in the background.

Observation data Epoch J2000.0 Equinox ICRS
- Constellation: Cygnus
- Right ascension: 19^{h} 30^{m} 00.90060^{s}
- Declination: 41° 49′ 49.5183″

Characteristics
- Evolutionary stage: Main sequence
- Spectral type: M5V
- Apparent magnitude (B): 19.1
- Apparent magnitude (R): 16.6
- Apparent magnitude (J): 13.379±0.023
- Apparent magnitude (H): 12.852±0.020
- Apparent magnitude (K): 12.589±0.026

Astrometry
| Proper motion (μ) | RA: −135.831(42) mas/yr Dec.: −99.524(53) mas/yr |
| Parallax (π) | 10.7808±0.0372 mas |
| Distance | 303 ± 1 ly (92.8 ± 0.3 pc) |

Details
| Mass | 0.1977±0.0051 M_{☉} |
| Radius | 0.2317±0.0049 R_{☉} |
| Surface gravity (log g) | 5.004±0.021 cgs |
| Temperature | 3240±61 K |
| Metallicity [Fe/H] | −0.15±0.11 dex |

Other designations
- Kepler-1649, KOI-3138, KIC 6444896, 2MASS J19300092+4149496

Database references
| SIMBAD | data |
| Exoplanet Archive | data |

Kepler-1649 is a red dwarf star of spectral type M5V with a radius 0.232 R_{☉}, a mass 0.198 M_{☉}, and a metallicity of -0.15 [Fe/H].

== Planetary system ==
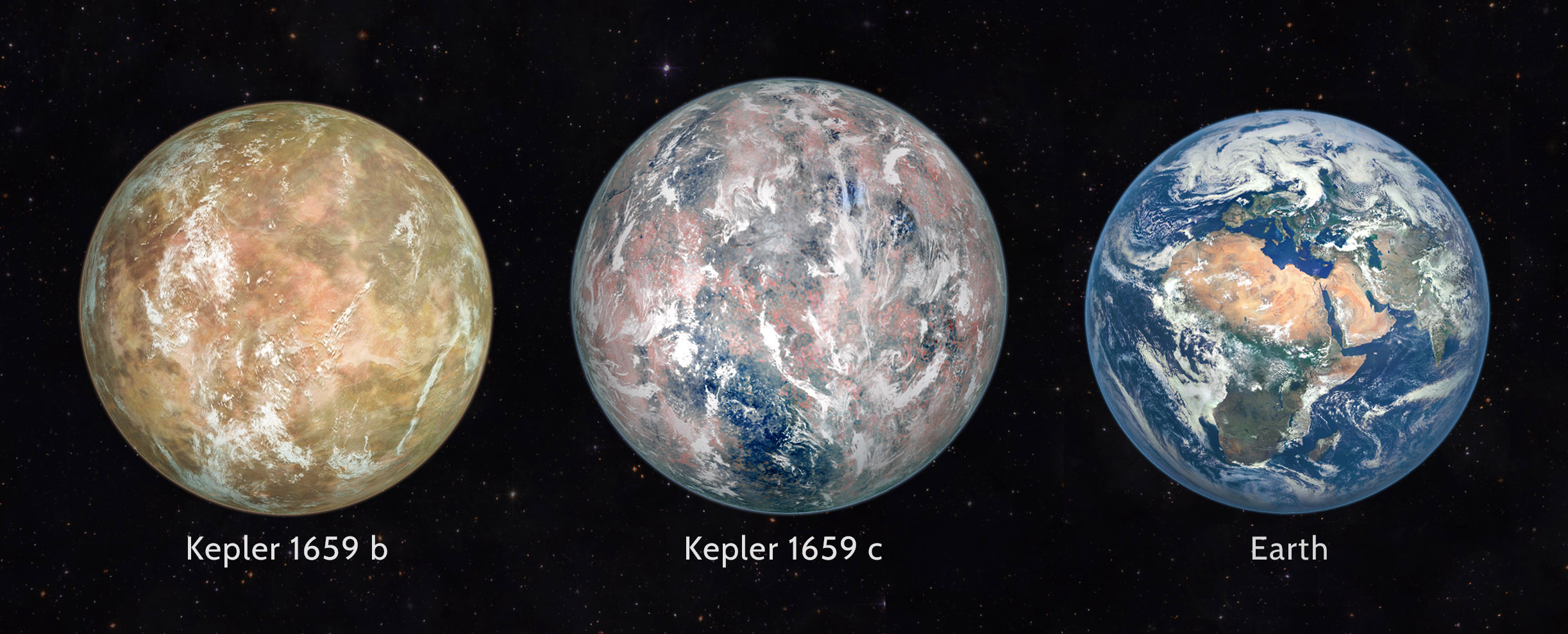
Artist's impression and size comparison of the two planets in the Kepler-1649 system with Earth

Two confirmed planets orbit the star: Kepler-1649b and Kepler-1649c. Kepler-1649b is similar to Venus, whereas Kepler-1649c is a potentially habitable exoplanet similar to Earth.

The Kepler-1649 planetary system
| Companion (in order from star) | Mass | Semimajor axis (AU) | Orbital period (days) | Eccentricity | Inclination (°) | Radius |
|---|---|---|---|---|---|---|
| b | 1.03 M_{🜨} | 0.0514±0.0028 | 8.689099±0.000025 | — | 89.150+0.110 −0.079 | 1.017±0.051 R_{🜨} |
| c | 1.2 M_{🜨} | 0.0649±0.002 | 19.53527±0.00010 | — | 89.339±0.056 | 1.06+0.15 −0.10 R_{🜨} |
