= K2-136 =

Planetary system in the Hyades cluster

Observation data Epoch J2000 Equinox ICRS
- Constellation: Taurus
- Right ascension: 04^{h} 29^{m} 38.9939^{s}
- Declination: +22° 52′ 57.794″
- Apparent magnitude (V): 11.200±0.010

Characteristics
- Evolutionary stage: main sequence
- Spectral type: K5V or K5.5V
- Apparent magnitude (B): 12.479±0.010
- Apparent magnitude (J): 9.096±0.022
- Apparent magnitude (H): 8.496±0.020
- Apparent magnitude (K): 8.368±0.019
- Variable type: planetary transit

Astrometry
Radial velocity (R_{v})	39.5210±0.0315 km/s
Proper motion (μ)	RA: 82.778±0.021 mas/yr Dec.: −35.541±0.015 mas/yr
Parallax (π)	16.9818±0.0189 mas
Distance	192.1 ± 0.2 ly (58.89 ± 0.07 pc)

Details
Mass	0.742+0.039 −0.038 M_{☉}
Radius	0.677±0.027 R_{☉}
Luminosity	0.1673+0.0053 −0.0049 L_{☉}
Surface gravity (log g)	4.68±0.10 cgs
Temperature	4500+125 −75 K
Metallicity [Fe/H]	0.05±0.10 dex
Rotation	13.37+0.13 −0.17 d
Rotational velocity (v sin i)	<2 km/s
Age	650±70 Myr

Other designations
- LP 358-348, K2-136, EPIC 247589423, TOI-5087, TIC 18310799, 2MASS J04293897+2252579, WISE J042939.05+225257.5, WISEA J042939.05+225257.4, Gaia DR2 145916050683920128, Gaia DR3 145916050683920128, UCAC-2 39797794, UCAC-4 565-010846, USNO-B1.0 1128-00068637

Database references
SIMBAD	data
Exoplanet Archive	data

K2-136 is a K-type main-sequence star located in the zodiac constellation Taurus. It is a member of the Hyades open cluster, which provides a well-constrained young age on the system. The star is known to host three transiting exoplanets, discovered in 2017 from lightcurves gathered by the Kepler space telescope during the K2 extension mission. The innermost planet is approximately Earth-sized, the first such planet found in a young open cluster.

The star is likely accompanied by a faint red dwarf of spectral type M7/8V located at a projected separation of ~40 AU.

== Observational history ==
K2-136 was identified as a high-proper-motion star during the Luyten Palomar Survey in the 1970s and was included in the Luyten-Palomar proper motion catalogue, where it received the designation LP 358‑348. Its possible membership in the Hyades based on its proper motion was pointed out by Natalia M. Artyukhina and Pavel N. Kholopov who published a catalog of proper motions of stars in the region of the open cluster in 1975–76, which was later confirmed by photometric measurements by Edward W. Weis in 1982.

A candidate planetary transit signal was already proposed in the WASP telescope photometry as part of the SEAWOLF survey in 2013, however the ground observations at the time found the proposed 3.169 d signal to be inconclusive. The proposed period and depth do not match any of the now known planets.

Due to its known membership in the Hyades cluster and relative brightness, the star was proposed for observation by the Kepler space telescope by seven different guest observers. The star, designated as EPIC 247589423 in the K2 input catalog, was observed from 8 March 2017 to 27 May 2017 during Campaign 13, with the calibrated data publicly released on 28 August 2017. Of the independent teams, two (led by Andrew Mann and by David Ciardi) have submitted their discovery papers on 29 September 2017, with a third one (led by John Livingston) following on 16 October 2017, making the planetary system a case of a triple co-discovery. All three discovery papers were published in The Astronomical Journal in January and March 2018.

X-ray observations of the star were carried out by XMM-Newton on 11 September 2018, obtaining a good quality spectrum in the 0.2–12.0 keV energy band.

A series of radial velocity measurements was carried out in the course of a planetary mass characterization study by Andrew W. Mayo et al. between 11 August 2018 and 31 October 2020, 93 with HARPS-N and 22 with ESPRESSO.

The star was also observed by TESS during Sectors 43 and 44, 2021 through 6 November 2021, receiving a TESS object of interest designation TOI‑5087.

== Stellar characteristics ==
K2-136 is relatively quiet for its age, with its lightcurve showing a coherent variability of ~1% and minor flares. The periodogram of brightness variations recorded by the Kepler space telescope shows the strongest variation at periods of 13-15 days, which can be identified with the rotation period of the star. The differing rates of rotation reported by different studies is possibly explained by differential rotation, similar to the Sun, with the equator likely rotating faster than higher latitudes by ~1 day.

The star's membership in the Hyades is confirmed by its kinematic, photometric data, with its motion and position on the color-magnitude diagram aligning with the rest of the Hyades cluster members.

X-ray observations with XMM-Newton measured the star's X-ray luminosity as (1.26±0.19)×10^{28} erg/s, or a fraction of (1.97±0.30)×10^{−5} of the total bolometric luminosity. These values indicate that K2-136 is somewhat less luminous in X-rays compared to other K dwarfs in the Hyades cluster, which is also consistent with a slightly slower than average rotation, but lies within the typical range for late-K dwarfs.

== Planetary system ==
The K2-136 planetary system (Note: Values given as upper limit indicate the 95% confidence interval.)
Companion (in order from star)	Mass	Semimajor axis (AU)	Orbital period (days)	Eccentricity	Inclination (°)	Radius
b	<4.3 M_{🜨}	0.0707±0.0012	7.97525±0.00073	0.14+0.12 −0.11	89.3+0.5 −0.7	1.014+0.050 −0.049 R_{🜨}
c	18.1+1.9 −1.8 M_{🜨}	0.1185+0.0020 −0.0021	17.307081+0.000014 −0.000013	0.047+0.062 −0.034	89.6±0.3	3.00±0.13 R_{🜨}
d	<3.0 M_{🜨}	0.1538+0.0026 −0.0027	25.5750+0.0022 −0.0021	0.071+0.063 −0.049	89.4+0.4 −0.2	1.565+0.077 −0.076 R_{🜨}

=== K2-136 b ===
K2-136 b, the innermost planet of the system, is approximately Earth-sized, with a radius of 1.014+0.050
−0.049 R_{🜨}. It is likely a terrestrial planet, though as of 2025, no composition is ruled out yet based on the upper limit of mass determined from radial velocity observations. However, based on evolution modelling, it is expected that the young star's intense X-ray radiation would have stripped the planet of its original gas envelope during the initial ten million years, meaning that the planet is most likely terrestrial. The planet's estimated equilibrium temperature is 560–610 K. (Note: Assuming albedo in the range between 0.3 and 0.5.)

=== K2-136 c ===
K2-136 c, the largest planet of the system, can be classified as a sub-Neptune. The measured value of its mass 18.1+1.9
−1.8 M_{🜨} is comparable to that of Neptune, but the radius of 3.00±0.13 R_{🜨} is significantly smaller. This is in contrast with the general trend that young Neptunes are puffier, implying a heavier composition. The calculated density of 3.69+0.67
−0.56 g⋅cm^{−3} is consistent with both a water-dominated ocean world composition and a large Earth-like core and a H/He envelope with a mass fraction of ~5%, or any combination of the non-detection of excess absorption by neutral helium in the spectrum of the starlight recorded by the Subaru Telescope during the transit on 2020.e two extremes. However, an ice-rich composition is unlikely and would imply that the planet initially formed much further away from the star. The planet's estimated equilibrium temperature is 440–470 K.

The planet is large enough that it is expected to retain most of its primordial atmosphere of hydrogen and helium, and that the contemporary atmospheric escape is minimal. This is also implied by the non-detection of excess absorption by neutral helium in the spectrum of the starlight recorded by the Subaru Telescope during the transit on 2020.

=== K2-136 d ===
K2-136 d is the outermost of the known planets of the system. Its radius of 1.565+0.077
−0.076 R_{🜨} places it at the lower edge of the Fulton gap. The planet's mass and density remain uncertain, as radial velocity observations have not yet conclusively detected its signal as of 2025. The upper limit of 3.0 M_{🜨} with 95% confidence corresponds to an upper limit for density of 4.3 g⋅cm^{−3} suggesting a bulk composition lighter than Earth. The planet's estimated equilibrium temperature is 380–420 K.

Based on plausible evolutionary models, the planet most likely has a mass of at least 2 M_{🜨} that still retains a fraction of its gaseous envelope to maintain the current low bulk density. It is likely that it formed with a similar envelope mass fraction as the planet c, but has lost most of it during the early evolution stages. An even lower current mass would imply either that the planet's initial gas envelope heavier than the core mass, or that the planet has already lost the gas envelope but is composed of a high fraction of ice, both of which is unlikely. The planet is likely still experiencing atmospheric escape at a non-negligible rate and may lose the remaining gaseous envelope within 2 billion years.

== See also ==
- K2-25
