= List of hottest exoplanets =

This is a list of the hottest exoplanets so far discovered, specifically those with temperatures greater than 2500 K (2230 °C; 4040 °F) for exoplanets irradiated by a nearby star and greater than 2000 K (1730 °C; 3140 °F) for self-luminous exoplanets. For comparison, the hottest planet in the Solar System is Venus, with a temperature of 737 K (464 °C; 867 °F).

== List of hottest exoplanets irradiated by a nearby star ==
Methods for finding temperature:

- T_{eff}: Measured effective temperature.
- T_{eq}: The temperature of the planet has not been measured, so it is listed with the calculated equilibrium temperature.

Image (Or artistic representation)	Name	Temperature (K)	Mass	Method	Notes
	KELT-9b	4643±26	2.17±0.56 M_{J}	T_{eff}	Hottest known exoplanet, with a temperature comparable to K-type stars.
	55 Cancri e (Janssen)	3771+669 −520	7.99 M_{🜨}	T_{eff}	Hottest confirmed rocky exoplanet.
	TOI-2109b	3631±69	5.02±0.75 M_{J}	T_{eff}	Has the shortest orbital period among the hot Jupiters in 0.6725 days (16.14 hours).
	BD-14 3065b	3520±130	12.37±0.92 M_{J}	T_{eff}	
	WASP-189b	3435±27	1.99+0.16 −0.14 M_{J}	T_{eff}	
	TOI-1518b	3237±59	<2.3 M_{J}	T_{eff}	
	WASP-103b	3205±136	1.455+0.090 −0.091 M_{J}	T_{eff}	First exoplanet to have a deformation detected. (see Jacobi ellipsoid)
	KELT-16b	3190±61	2.75 M_{J}	T_{eff}	
	WASP-12b	3128±66	1.476+0.076 −0.069 M_{J}	T_{eff}	This planet is so close to its parent star that its tidal forces are distorting it into an egg shape. First planet observed being consumed by its host star; it will be destroyed in 3.16 ± 0.10 Ma due to tidal interactions.
	WASP-33b	3108±113	2.81±0.53 M_{J}	T_{eff}	First planet discovered to orbit a Delta Scuti variable star
	WASP-18b	3067±104	10.20±0.35 M_{J}	T_{eff}	
	MASCARA-1b	3062±67	3.7 M_{J}	T_{eff}	
	HATS-70b	2730+140 −160	12.9 M_{J}	T_{eq}	
	WASP-100b	2710	2.03 M_{J}	T_{eff}	
	MASCARA-5b	2700	3.12 M_{J}	T_{eff}	
	WASP-76b	2670 (dayside)	0.92±0.032 M_{J}	T_{eff}	A glory effect in the atmosphere of WASP-76b might be responsible for the observed increase in brightness of its eastern terminator zone which if confirmed, it would become the first exoplanet to have its glory-like phenomenon to be discovered.
	HAT-P-7b	2667±57	1.806±0.036 M_{J}	T_{eff}	First exoplanet to have a crude map of cloud coverage
	TOI-2260 b	2609±86	0.011 ^{+0.0079}_{−0.0041} M_{J}	T_{eq}	
	HAT-P-70b	2562+43 −52	6.78 M_{J}	T_{eq}	
	Kepler-13b	2550±80 (2277 °C)	9.28(16) M_{J}	T_{eq}	Discovered by Kepler in first four months of Kepler data.
	The following well-known planets are listed for the purpose of comparison.				
	Kepler-10b	2130+60 −120 (1857 °C)	3.58±0.33 M_{🜨}	T_{eq}	First confirmed terrestrial planet to have been discovered outside the Solar System
	TrES-4b	1782±29 (1509 °C)	0.78±0.19 M_{J}	T_{eq}	Largest confirmed exoplanet ever found at the time of discovery. This planet has a density of 0.17 g/cm^{3}, comparable to that of balsa wood, less than Saturn's 0.7 g/cm^{3}.
	CoRoT-7b	1756±27 (1483 °C)	5.74 M_{🜨}	T_{eq}	Smallest exoplanet to have its diameter measured at the time of discovery and first potential extrasolar terrestrial planet to be found.
	Upsilon Andromedae b (Saffar)	1673 (1400 °C)	1.70+0.33 −0.24 M_{J}	T_{eff}	First multiple-planet system to be discovered around a main-sequence star, and first multiple-planet system known in a multiple-star system.
	WASP-17b (Ditsö̀)	1550+170 −200 (1277 °C)	0.512±0.037 M_{J}	T_{eff}	With a density of about 0.08 g/cm^{3}, it is one of the puffiest exoplanets known.
	HD 209458 b ("Osiris")	1499±15 (1226 °C)	0.682+0.014 −0.015 M_{J}	T_{eff}	Represents multiple milestones in exoplanetary discovery, such as the first exoplanet known observed to transit its host star, the first exoplanet with a precisely measured radius, one of first two exoplanets (other being HD 189733 Ab) to be observed spectroscopically and the first to have an atmosphere detected, containing evaporating hydrogen, and oxygen and carbon. First extrasolar gas giant to have its superstorm measured. Also first (indirect) detection of a magnetic field on an exoplanet. Nicknamed "Osiris".
	TrES-2b	1466±9 (1193 °C)	1.253 M_{J}	T_{eq}	The darkest exoplanet known, reflecting less than 1% its star's light.
	51 Pegasi b (Dimidium)	1265 (992 °C)	0.46+0.06 −0.01 M_{J}	T_{eq}	The first exoplanet discovered orbiting a main-sequence star.
	Kepler-20e	1004±14 (735 °C)	<0.76 M_{🜨}	T_{eq}	The first planet smaller than Earth discovered after PSR B1257+12 b.
	Venus (for reference)	735 (462 °C)	0.815 M_{🜨}		Hottest planet in the Solar System.

== List of hottest self-luminous exoplanets ==
All these are measured temperatures.

Image (Or artistic representation)	Name	Temperature (K)	Mass (M_{J})	Notes
	HIP 78530 b	2700±100	28 ± 10	Likely a brown dwarf.
	GQ Lupi b	2650±100	~ 20 (1 – 39)	Likely a brown dwarf. First confirmed exoplanet candidate to be directly imaged.
	CT Chamaelontis b (CT Cha b)	2600±250	17 ± 6	Likely a brown dwarf. Furthest planet to be directly imaged at the distance of 622 ly (190.71 pc).
	DH Tauri b	2400±100	11 ± 3	First planet to have a confirmed circumplanetary disk and youngest confirmed planet at an age of 0.7 Myr.
	The following well-known planets are listed for the purpose of comparison.			
	Beta Pictoris b	1724±15 (1451 °C)	11.729 ^{+2.337}_{−2.135}	First exoplanet to have its rotation rate measured and fastest-spinning planet discovered at the equator speed of 19.9 ± 1.0 km/s (12.37 ± 0.62 mi/s) or 71,640 ± 3,600 km/h (44,520 ± 2,240 mph).

== Unconfirmed candidates ==
These planet candidates have not been confirmed.

Image (Or artistic representation)	Name	Temperature (K)	Mass	Method
	Kepler-70b	7662 (Note: Assuming albedo of 0.1)	0.44 M_{🜨}	T_{eq}
	Kepler-70c	6807 (Note: Assuming albedo of 0.1)	0.655 M_{🜨}	T_{eq}
	WD 2226-210 b	4970		T_{eq}
	Vega b	3250 (Note: Assuming bond albedo of 0.25)	21.9 M_{🜨}	T_{eq}
