= Kelt =

KELT may refer to:

- A Salmonid that has spawned at least once and did not die afterwards
- An alternative spelling of Celt
- KELT (FM), call letters of an FM radio station located in Encinal, Texas
- KELT, the former call letters of an FM radio station located in Adelanto, California
- Kelt (beer), a beer found in Slovakia and the Czech Republic
- The NATO Reporting Name (AS-5 Kelt) for the Raduga KSR-2 cruise missile formerly used by the armed forces of the Soviet Union
- The acronym for Kilodegree Extremely Little Telescope, an astronomical survey for transiting exoplanets, or the planets discovered by the KELT survey, such as
  - KELT-2Ab
  - KELT-9b
