= WASP-178b =

Exoplanet in the constellation Lupus

WASP-178b / KELT-26b
Discovery
- Discovered by: Hellier et al. / Rodríguez Martínez et al.
- Discovery date: November / December 2019 (announced)
- Detection method: Transit method

Designations
- Alternative names: CD−42° 10057b, HD 134004 b, TIC 160708862 b, TOI-1337 b, TYC 7829-2324-1 b, 2MASS J15090488-4242178 b

Orbital characteristics
- Semi-major axis: 0.0558±0.0010 AU
- Eccentricity: 0
- Orbital period (sidereal): 3.3448285±0.0000012 d
- Inclination: 85.7°±0.6°
- Semi-amplitude: 139±9 m/s
- Star: WASP-178

Physical characteristics
- Mean radius: 1.81±0.09 R_{J}
- Mass: 1.66±0.12 M_{J}
- Mean density: 0.37±0.07 g/cm^{3}
- Temperature: 2470±60 K (2,200 °C; 3,990 °F, equilibrium)

WASP-178b, also known as KELT-26b and HD 134004 b, is an ultra-hot Jupiter exoplanet discovered in 2019 orbiting WASP-178, a hot A-type star located about 1,350 light-years (410 parsecs) away in the constellation of Lupus. At over 1.8 times the radius of Jupiter, it is among the largest exoplanets. The planet is tidally locked, heating up one side of the planet to such a degree that silicate rock and metal evaporate. Supersonic winds blow constantly towards the dark, cooler nighttime side, where the vaporized minerals condense and fall as rain.

== Discovery and nomenclature ==
The planet was discovered by a team of astronomers led by Coel Hellier, who published their findings in November 2019, alongside the detection of three other planets, designated WASP-184b, WASP-185b, and WASP-192b. The four planets were all found through photometric analysis of astronomical transit data collected by WASP-South, hence the "WASP-" prefix. For WASP-178b, data was gathered over the course of eight years between May 2006 and August 2014, which was combined with follow-up observations by the CORALIE spectrograph and EulerCam, which are both part of the Swiss 1.2-metre Leonhard Euler Telescope.

Another team, headed by Romy Rodríguez Martínez, independently announced discovering the planet in December 2019 as part of the Kilodegree Extremely Little Telescope (KELT) survey, labeling it KELT-26b. The host star was photometrically observed by the KELT-South telescope for two years between September 2013 and September 2015, identifying the object as a planetary candidate. Further observations confirmed the exoplanet, which were made by TESS, the Perth Exoplanet Survey Telescope (PEST), and the CHIRON spectrograph on the SMARTS 1.5 m telescope, located at the Cerro Tololo Inter-American Observatory (CTIO). The planet was the 26th and final planet discovered by the KELT survey before it was decommissioned in 2020.

Earlier designations of the host star include CD−42° 10057 in the Cordoba Durchmusterung catalogue and HD 134004 in the Henry Draper catalogue.

== Physical properties ==
The planet orbits its host star every 3.34 days at a distance of 0.0558 AU (8,350,000 km), a mere one-seventh the radius of Mercury's orbit. This proximity to its host star, 20 times more luminous than the Sun, heats its atmosphere up to a white-hot equilibrium temperature of 2,470 K (2,200 °C; 3,990 °F), comparable to the boiling point of silver (2,162 °C). Due to the intense irradiation, some of the highest even among the ultra-hot Jupiters, the planet's outer layers are inflated to an enormous 1.81 R_{J} or 1.940 R_{J}, making it one of the largest planets discovered so far alongside other hot Jupiters such as WASP-12b and Ditsö̀. This also means that the planet has a low density of 0.37 g/cm^{3} or 0.238 g/cm^{3}, or about as light as cork (0.24 g/cm^{3}).

The planet's geometric albedo was measured to be between 0.1 and 0.35 by utilizing CHEOPS photometry and was then further constrained to be below 0.23, implying that it has a poorly reflective surface typical of gas giants.

=== Atmosphere ===
The dayside temperature of WASP-178b is calculated at 2,250–2,750 K, which is sufficient to evaporate silicate rock, and above 2,500 K, break down hydrogen molecules into individual atoms. The planet's tidal locking causes the heated daylight side's atmosphere to blow across to the nighttime side at speeds of 2,000 miles per hour (3,200 km/h). On the nightside of the planet, the atomic hydrogen recouples back into molecular H_{2}, and minerals that evaporated on the dayside may cool and condense into rock that pours down from clouds as rain.

In 2022, the discovery of silicon monoxide was reported on WASP-178b, the first time the compound was detected in an exoplanet, and consistent with theoretical predictions of silicate minerals at high temperatures. A follow-up study in 2024, however, concluded that the atmosphere is more likely dominated by ionized magnesium and iron rather than silicon monoxide.

Emission signals from the dayside of the planet as well as the result of eclipse observations strongly suggest the presence of an atmospheric super-rotation and indicate that the chemical composition of the dayside atmosphere may be uneven.

== Host star ==
The host star, WASP-178, is a likely Am star and possibly a Delta Scuti variable, with a spectral type of A1IV-V meaning it is in between being a main sequence star and a subgiant. The star is comparable to Sirius A in mass and radius, but slightly cooler, older, and less luminous. It is about twice as massive as the Sun and has a radius of 1.67 or 1.80 R_{☉}, with an effective temperature of roughly 9,000 K. A 2019 estimate of 9350±150 K makes WASP-178 the second-hottest host to a hot Jupiter ever discovered, behind KELT-9 (10,170 K) and ahead of MASCARA-2 (8,980 K), though a lower estimate (8,640 K) provided by another paper may put it below MASCARA-2. The star is around 20 times brighter than the Sun and is 430+310
−250 million years old.

=== Comparison with Sirius A ===
Identifier	Stellar Class	Mass (M_{☉})	Radius (R_{☉})	Luminosity (L_{☉})	Temperature (K)	Metallicity (dex)	Age (Myr)	Notes
Sirius A	A0mA1 Va	2.063	1.713	24.7	9,845	+0.50	242	
WASP-178	A1IV-V	2.07	1.67	21.4	9,350	+0.21	430	

== See also ==
- KELT-9b
- KELT-20b
- Kepler-13Ab
- MASCARA-1b
- WASP-33b
- WASP-189b
