= Kilodegree Extremely Little Telescope =

Astronomical observation system

- Alternative names: KELT
- Coordinates: 34°17′N 111°40′W

The Kilodegree Extremely Little Telescope (or KELT) is an astronomical observation system formed by two robotic telescopes that are conducting a survey for transiting exoplanets around bright stars. The project is jointly administered by members of Ohio State University Department of Astronomy, the Vanderbilt University Department of Physics and Astronomy Astronomy Group, the Lehigh University Department of Physics, and the South African Astronomical Observatory (SAAO).

== KELT Telescopes ==
KELT consists of two telescopes, KELT-North in Arizona in the United States, and KELT-South at the SAAO observing station near Sutherland, South Africa.

Each KELT telescope consists of a wide field (26 degrees × 26 degrees) medium format telephoto lens with a 4.2 cm aperture, mounted in front of a 4k × 4k Apogee CCD. Each can also be equipped with an alternative narrower field (10.8 degrees × 10.8 degrees) lens with a 7.1 cm aperture for a narrow angle campaign mode. KELT-North uses an Apogee AP16E camera, while KELT South uses an Apogee U16M. The optical assemblies and cameras are mounted on Paramount ME mounts manufactured by Software Bisque. The telescopes were made with off-the-shelf components, and were thus much cheaper than many observatories.

- KELT-North is located at Winer Observatory in southeastern Arizona, about an hour's drive from Tucson. KELT-North was installed at Winer in 2005, and operated continuously until 2022, with occasional interruptions for equipment failures and poor weather. KELT-North was decommissioned in 2022.
- KELT-South is located at the Sutherland astronomical observation station owned and operated by SAAO, about 370 kilometers (230 mi) North of Cape Town. KELT-South was deployed at Sutherland in 2009.

== Goals ==
KELT is dedicated to discovering transiting exoplanets orbiting stars in the apparent magnitude range of 8 < V < 10. This is the region just fainter than the set of stars comprehensively surveyed for planets by the radial-velocity surveys, but brighter than those typically observed by most transit surveys.

== Operations ==
Both KELT telescopes operate by sequentially observing a series of predefined fields around the sky all night, every night when the weather is good. All recordings are made with 150-second exposures, optimized to observe stars in the target magnitude range.

== Discoveries ==
KELT has made several exoplanet discoveries and at least one brown dwarf (which may be an extremely massive Super-Jupiter instead) to date. Yellow rows in the table below indicate the planet is contained in a binary system.

=== Exoplanets ===
Star	Constellation	Right ascension	Declination	App. mag.	Distance (ly)	Spectral type	Planet	Mass (M_{J})	Radius (R_{J})	Density (g/cm^{3})	Orbital period (d)	Semimajor axis (AU)	Orbital eccentricity	Inclination (°)	Discovery year
KELT-2A	Auriga	06^{h} 10^{m} 39^{s}	+30° 57′ 26″	8.77	420	F7V	KELT-2Ab	1.486	1.306		4.11379	0.05498	0.0	88.5	2012
KELT-3	Leo	09^{h} 54^{m} 34.0^{s}	+30° 38′ 24″	9.8	580	F6V	KELT-3b	1.418	1.333	0.75	2.70339	0.04117	0.0	84.32	2012
KELT-4A	Leo	10^{h} 28^{m} 15.011^{s}	+25° 34′ 23.5″	9.98	685	F8V	KELT-4Ab	0.878	1.706		2.9895933	0.04321	0.0	83.11	2015
KELT-6	Coma Berenices	13^{h} 03^{m} 56^{s}	+30° 38′ 24″	10.38	724	F8IV	KELT-6b	0.43	1.19	0.311	7.84563	0.079	0.22 ^{+0.12}_{−0.10}	88.81	2013
KELT-6	Coma Berenices	13^{h} 03^{m} 56^{s}	+30° 38′ 24″	10.38	724	F8IV	KELT-6c	3.71	1.16		1,276	2.39	0.21		2015
KELT-7	Auriga	05^{h} 13^{m} 11^{s}	+33° 19′ 05″	8.54	420	F2V	KELT-7b	1.28	1.533	0.442	2.7347749	0.04415	0.0	83.76	2015
KELT-8	Hercules	18^{h} 53^{m} 13.31^{s}	24° 07′ 38.09″	10.85	664	G2V	KELT-8b	0.66	1.62	0.165	3.24	0.04550	0.04±0.05	82.65±0.90	2015
KELT-9	Cygnus	20^{h} 31^{m} 27^{s}	+39° 56′ 20″	7.56	620	B9.5V	KELT-9b								2015
KELT-10	Telescopium	18^{h} 58^{m} 11.61^{s}	−47° 00′ 11.91″	10.62	614	G0V	KELT-10b	0.68	1.4	0.308	4.17	0.05250	0?	88.61	2015
KELT-11	Sextans	10^{h} 46^{m} 49.66^{s}	−09° 23′ 57.71″	8.04	323	G8/K0IV	KELT-11b	0.171	1.35	0.009	4.74	0.06±0.005	0.0007±0.0015	85.3±0.2	2017
KELT-12	Hercules	17^{h} 50^{m} 33.72^{s}	+36° 34′ 12.63″	10.59	1200	F7III-IV	KELT-12b	0.95	1.78	0.209	5.03	0.06708	0.0	84.47±0.15	2017
KELT-13/WASP-167	Centaurus	13^{h} 04^{m} 10.51^{s}	−35° 32′ 58.31″	10.571	1381	F1V	KELT-13/WASP-167b	<8	1.58		2.02	0.0365		79.9	2017
KELT-14/WASP-122	Puppis	7^{h} 13^{m} 12.34^{s}	−42° 24′ 35.14″	11	816	G2V	KELT-14/WASP-122b	1.284	1.743	0.322	1.71	0.03	0.0	78.3	2016
KELT-15	Carina	07^{h} 49^{m} 39.59^{s}	−52° 07′ 13.57″	11.39	1,068	G0V	KELT-15Ab	0.91	1.443	0.36	3.33	0.04	0	88.3	2015
KELT-16	Cygnus	20^{h} 57^{m} 04.44^{s}	+31° 39′ 39.63″	11.72	1,469	F7V	KELT-16Ab	2.75	1.415	1.20 ± 0.18	0.97	0.02	0	84.4	2017
KELT-17	Cancer	8^{h} 22^{m} 28.20^{s}	+13° 44′ 07.14″	9.23	743	A7V	KELT-17b	1.32	1.525	0.46	3.08	0.05		84.87	2016
KELT-18	Ursa Major	14^{h} 26^{m} 05.76^{s}	+59° 26′ 39.29″	10.16	1,057	F4V	KELT-18Ab	1.18	1.57	0.377	2.87	0.04	0	82.90	2017
KELT-19	Canis Minor	07^{h} 26^{m} 02.29^{s}	+07° 36′ 56.18″	9.86	987	A8V	KELT-19Ab	<4.07	1.91	<0.744	4.61	0.064		85.14	2017
KELT-20	Cygnus	19^{h} 38^{m} 38.74^{s}	+31° 31′ 09.22″	7.58	446	A2V	KELT-20b	<3.382	1.741	<0.806	3.474	0.05	0?	86.12	2017
KELT-21	Cygnus	20^{h} 19^{m} 12.00^{s}	+32° 34′ 51.76″	10.48	1,556	A6V	KELT-21b	<3.91	1.586	<1.24	3.612	0.05	0	86.46	2018
KELT-22/WASP-173	Sculptor	23^{h} 36^{m} 40.38^{s}	−34° 36′ 42.68″	11.3	766	G3V	KELT-22/WASP-173Ab	3.47	1.285	2.02	1.386	0.02	0	85.2	2018
KELT-23	Ursa Minor	15^{h} 28^{m} 35.19^{s}	+66° 21′ 31.54″	10.31	413	G1V	KELT-23b	0.94	1.32	0.503	2.26	0.03	0	85.37	2019
KELT-24	Ursa Major	10^{h} 47^{m} 38.35^{s}	+71° 39′ 21.16″	8.33	316	F5.5V	KELT-24b	5.18	1.27	3.13	5.55	0.07	0.08	89.17	2019
KELT-25	Canis Major	07^{h} 12^{m} 29.55^{s}	−24° 57′ 12.82″	9.63	1,443	A4V
KELT-26/WASP-178	Lupus	15^{h} 09^{m} 04.89^{s}	−42° 42′ 17.79″	9.95	1,410	A1V	KELT-26/WASP-178b	1.41	1.94	0.238	3.35	0.06	0	84.45	2019

=== Brown dwarfs ===
In addition, the survey has discovered brown dwarfs like KELT-1b.

Star	Constellation	Right ascension	Declination	App. mag.	Distance (ly)	Spectral type	Planet	Mass (M_{J})	Radius (R_{J})	Density (g/cm^{3})	Orbital period (d)	Semimajor axis (AU)	Orbital eccentricity	Inclination (°)	Discovery year
KELT-1	Andromeda	00^{h} 01^{m} 26.92^{s}	+39° 23′ 01.7″	10.00	854	F5V	KELT-1b	27.23	1.110		1.217513	0.0247	0.0	87.80
