= WASP-178 =

Star in the constellation Lupus

WASP-178 / KELT-26
- Location of WASP-178 (circled)

Observation data Epoch J2000.0 Equinox ICRS
- Constellation: Lupus
- Right ascension: 15^{h} 09^{m} 04.89336^{s}
- Declination: −42° 42′ 17.7894″
- Apparent magnitude (V): 9.9

Characteristics
- Evolutionary stage: main sequence
- Spectral type: A1IV-V
- Variable type: Planetary transit variable, possibly Delta Scuti variable

Astrometry
Radial velocity (R_{v})	−23.908 km/s
Proper motion (μ)	RA: −10.243 mas/yr Dec.: −5.636 mas/yr
Parallax (π)	2.4248±0.0216 mas
Distance	1,350 ± 10 ly (412 ± 4 pc)

Details
Mass	2.02+0.04 −0.05 M_{☉}
Radius	1.70±0.01 R_{☉}
Luminosity	16.2+3.7 −1.8, 21.4+1.9 −2.0 L_{☉}
Surface gravity (log g)	4.28±0.01 cgs
Temperature	9,200+200 −170 K
Metallicity [Fe/H]	0.03+0.10 −0.12 dex
Rotational velocity (v sin i)	8.2±0.6 km/s
Age	140+100 −80 Myr

Other designations
- CD−42°10057, CPD−42°6923, HD 134004, PPM 320287, TOI-1337, TIC 160708862, WASP-178, TYC 7829-2324-1, GSC 07829-02324, 2MASS J15090488-4242178, Gaia DR2 6003809889735481856, KELT-26

Database references
SIMBAD	data
Exoplanet Archive	data

WASP-178, also known as KELT-26 and HD 134004, is a star located about 1,350 light-years (410 parsecs) away in the southern constellation of Lupus. It is a hot A-type main sequence star or subgiant, a likely Am star, and a possible Delta Scuti variable, about twice as massive as the Sun and twenty times as luminous. In late 2019, the star was discovered to be orbited by an ultra-hot Jupiter planet, WASP-178b, making it one of the hottest stars known to host a hot Jupiter.

== Physical properties ==
WASP-178 has a spectral type of A1IV-V, indicating that it is in an evolutionary stage between a main sequence star and a subgiant. The star is comparable to Sirius A in mass and radius, but slightly cooler, older, and less luminous. It is about twice as massive as the Sun and has a radius of 1.7 R_{☉}, with an effective temperature of roughly 9,000 K. A 2019 estimate of 9,360±150 K makes WASP-178 the second-hottest host to a hot Jupiter ever discovered, behind KELT-9 (10,170 K) and ahead of MASCARA-2 (8,980 K), though a lower estimate (8,640+500
−240 K) provided by another paper may put it below MASCARA-2. The star is around 20 times brighter than the Sun and is about 140 million years old. For comparison, Sirius A has a mass of 2.063 M_{☉}, a radius of 1.711 R_{☉}, an effective temperature of 9,940 K, a luminosity of 25.4 L_{☉}, and an age of 242 Myr.

Much like Sirius A, the star is a likely Am star and a slow rotator, with a rotational velocity of 8.2–12.2 km/s. For comparison, Sirius A has a rotational velosity of 16 km/s, while typical A-type stars rotate much faster at around 160 km/s. It has a near- or above-solar metallicity. The star is rich in chromium, nickel, yttrium, and barium, while being slightly poor in calcium and scandium.

== Variability ==
Aside from periodic dimming caused by the transiting planet, the star experiences regular oscillations in brightness by a few thousandths of a magnitude. The period at which the oscillations occur is measured to be 0.185 days, almost exactly one-eighteenth of WASP-178b's orbital period. The planet's mass is likely too small to cause periodic swaying of the host star, therefore it remains to be known whether this is merely coincidental.

The nature of the luminosity fluctuations, namely the period and amplitude, along with the star's position within the instability strip in the Hertzsprung–Russell diagram implies that WASP-178 may be a Delta Scuti variable.

== Possible stellar companion ==
Significant excess noise in the astrometry, totaling to 0.18 milliarcseconds in 254 astrometric measurements, is reported for WASP-178 in the Gaia DR2 catalogue. This may suggest a previously unresolved and invisible binary companion.

== Planetary system ==
In 2019, two teams, part of the WASP and KELT planet surveys respectively, independently reported the discovery of an exoplanet orbiting the star using the transit method. The planet was revealed to be an ultra-hot Jupiter revolving around the star every 3.3 days a mere 0.0558 AU (8,350,000 km) away, heating its surface up to a white-hot 2,470 K (2,200 °C; 3,990 °F). As a result of intense stellar radiation it receives, some of the highest known in an ultra-hot Jupiter, the planet's atmosphere is inflated to a radius of 1.81±0.09 R_{J} or 1.940+0.060
−0.058 R_{J}, placing it among the largest planets discovered so far.

Photometric observations at the CHEOPS space telescope revealed that the planet has a low geometric albedo of 0.1–0.35, typical of giant planets. Based on this, the dayside temperature of WASP-178b is estimated at 2,250–2,800 K, more than enough to vaporize silicate rock. As one side of the planet always faces the star (tidal locking), the atmosphere on the heated daytime side blows across the planet toward the nighttime side in winds reaching upwards of 2,000 miles per hour (3,200 km/h). On the nightside of the planet, minerals that evaporated on the dayside may cool and condense into rock that pours down from clouds as rain. Silicon monoxide in particular was reported to have been discovered on WASP-178b in 2022, the first time the compound was detected in an exoplanet, but consistent with theoretical models on silicate minerals at high temperatures. In 2024, however, a follow-up study found that the atmosphere was instead more likely dominated by ionized magnesium and iron.

The WASP-178 planetary system
Companion (in order from star)	Mass	Semimajor axis (AU)	Orbital period (days)	Eccentricity	Inclination (°)	Radius
b	1.66±0.12 M_{J}	0.0558±0.0010	3.3448285±0.0000012	0	85.7±0.6	1.81±0.09 R_{J}
