= KELT-2Ab =

Hot Jupiter

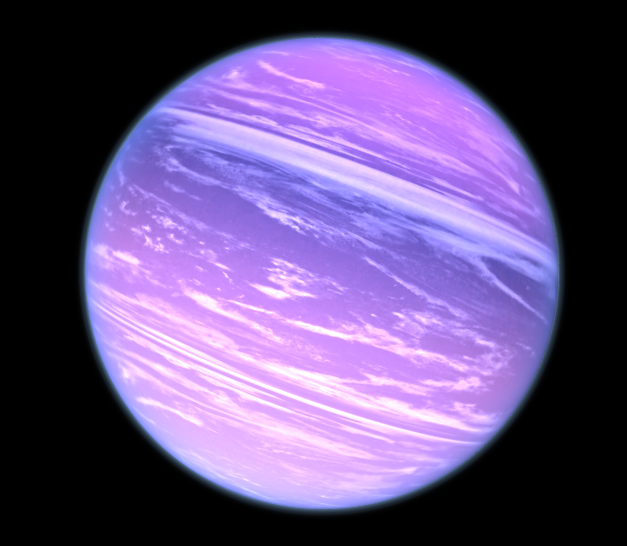

Discovery
- Discovered by: T. G. Beatty et al.
- Discovery date: 7 June 2012
- Detection method: Transit

Orbital characteristics
- Semi-major axis: 0.5504 ± 0.00086 AU (82.339 ± 0.129 million km)
- Eccentricity: 0
- Orbital period (sidereal): 4.1137913 ± 0.00001 d
- Inclination: 88.56 ± 1.14
- Time of periastron: 2,455,974.60338 ± 0.00083
- Argument of periastron: 90
- Semi-amplitude: 161.1 ± 7.8
- Star: KELT-2A

Physical characteristics
- Mean radius: 1.290 ± 0.057 R_{J}
- Mass: 1.524 ± 0.088 M_{J}
- Mean density: 0.940 ± 0.090 g/cm^{3}
- Surface gravity: 22.7 m/s^{2} (74 ft/s^{2}); 2.3 g
- Temperature: 1,994±104 K or 1,782±111 K

KELT-2Ab is an extrasolar planet that orbits the star KELT-2A approximately 440 light-years away in the constellation of Auriga. It was discovered by the KELT-North survey via the transit method—so both its mass and radius are known quite precisely—in a paper led by Thomas Beatty. As of its discovery KELT-2Ab is the fifth-brightest transiting Hot Jupiter known that has a well-constrained mass. This makes the KELT-2A system a promising target for future space- and ground-based follow-up observations to learn about the planet's atmosphere.

Water vapour was detected in planetary atmosphere in 2018.

The star KELT-2A is a member of the common-proper-motion binary star system KELT-2 (HD 42176). KELT-2B is an early K dwarf approximately 295 astronomical units away.

== See also ==
- KELT
- KELT-9b
- KELT-1
- KELT-10
- KELT-11b
