= KELT-4Ab =

Hot Jupiter orbiting KELT-4A

Discovery
- Discovered by: KELT-North
- Discovery date: 2015
- Detection method: Transit

Orbital characteristics
- Semi-major axis: 0.04321 ± 0.00085 AU (6,464,000 ± 127,000 km)
- Eccentricity: 0.03 ± 0.021
- Orbital period (sidereal): 2.9895933 (± 4.9e-06) d
- Inclination: 83.11 ± 0.057
- Star: KELT-4A

Physical characteristics
- Mean radius: 1.706 ± 0.085 R_{J}
- Mass: 0.878 ± 0.07 M_{J}

KELT-4Ab is an extrasolar planet that orbits the star KELT-4A, in the star system KELT-4. The planet is approximately 760 ly (230 pc) away in the constellation of Leo. The planet was discovered by the Kilodegree Extremely Little Telescope (KELT).

== Characteristics ==
The exoplanet was discovered by transit and is a Hot Jupiter planet orbiting a star in a triple star system, KELT-4. It is the fourth planet found in such a system. As KELT-4A is the brightest host (V~10) of a Hot Jupiter in a hierarchical triple stellar system found so far researchers expect it may be useful in learning more about inflated planets.

== Star system ==
KELT-4 is a triple star system. KELT-4BC is a binary star system subcomponent of the triple, 328 ± 16 AU (4.91×10^{10} ± 2.4×10^{9} km; 3.05×10^{10} ± 1.5×10^{9} mi) away from KELT-4A and the projected separation between KELT-4B and KELT-4C is 10.30 ± 0.74 AU (1.541×10^{9} ± 111,000,000 km; 957,000,000 ± 69,000,000 mi).

== See also ==
- Gliese 667 Cc, a planet in a triple star system
- KELT-2Ab, a previous planet discovered by the KELT survey, in a binary system
