= KELT-18b =

Giant exoplanet in the constellation Ursa Major

Discovery
- Discovery site: Winer Observatory in Sonoita, Arizona (KELTNorth)
- Discovery date: February 6, 2017
- Detection method: Transit

Orbital characteristics
- Semi-major axis: 0.0455 ± 0.00069 AU (6,807,000 ± 103,000 km)
- Eccentricity: 0
- Orbital period (sidereal): 2.87±0.00 d
- Inclination: 82.90°+0.62° −0.54°
- Time of periastron: 2,457,542.53±0.00 JD
- Semi-amplitude: 127±11 m/s
- Star: KELT-18

Physical characteristics
- Mean radius: 1.57±0.04 R_{J}
- Mass: 1.18±0.11 M_{J}
- Mean density: 0.380 ± 0.040 g/cm^{3}
- Temperature: 2,085+39 −38 K

KELT-18b is a hot Jupiter orbiting the F-type main sequence star KELT-18 approximately 1,058 light years away in the northern circumpolar constellation Ursa Major. The planet was discovered using the transit method, and was announced in June 2017.

== Discovery ==
KELT-18b was discovered in 2017 by scientists using the KELTNorth telescope at the Winer Observatory. The paper states that this planet is the most "inflated" of its type due to its low mass, density, and high radius.

== Properties ==
KELT-18b has 1.18 times Jupiter's mass, and is 57% larger than Jupiter. Despite the high mass, its density is lower than Saturn's, and has a high equilibrium temperature of 2,085 K due to orbiting close to a hot star. The planet orbits at a distance 10 times closer than Mercury's in almost 3 days.
