= Scott Gaudi =

American astronomer

B. Scott Gaudi
- Born: 1974 (age 51–52)
- Education: Ohio State University PhD; Michigan State University BSc
- Awards: NASA Outstanding Public Leadership Medal (2017); Presidential Early Career Award for Scientists and Engineers (2012); Helen B. Warner Prize (2009); Hubble Fellowship (2000)
- Scientific career
- Fields: Exoplanets, Microlensing
- Workplaces: Ohio State University (2006–); Center for Astrophysics | Harvard & Smithsonian (2003–2006); Institute for Advanced Study (2002–2003)
- Thesis: Microlensing and the Search for Extrasolar Planets (2000)
- Doctoral advisor: Andrew Gould
- Website: astronomy.osu.edu/people/gaudi.1

Bernard Scott Gaudi (born 1974) is an American astronomer. He is the Thomas Jefferson Professor for Discovery and Space Exploration, a professor of astronomy, and chair of undergraduate studies at Ohio State University's department of astronomy. He was chair of the NASA Exoplanet Exploration Program Analysis Group (2012–2014) and the NASA Astrophysics Advisory Committee (2012–2014). In 2018, Gaudi was co-chair of the National Academy of Sciences Exoplanet Science Strategy study.

== Background ==
Gaudi grew up in a small rural town in Illinois. He completed high school at the Illinois Mathematics and Science Academy, his undergraduate education at the Michigan State University, and his doctorate at Ohio State University.

Gaudi has been a faculty member of the Ohio State University Department of Astronomy since 2006. He previously was a Menzel Fellow at Harvard College Observatory in Cambridge, Massachusetts, and a Hubble Fellow at the Institute for Advanced Study in Princeton, NJ.

Gaudi is a gay man. He shared that he hopes to bring representation to astronomy, and he has focused on engaging LGBTQ and HIV-impacted youth with astronomy.

== Academic research ==
In 2017, he co-led the Kilodegree Extremely Little Telescope survey collaboration and announced the discovery of KELT-9b, which is the hottest transiting gas giant ever discovered.

Gaudi's first major media appearance was in Discover, when the magazine named him one of "20 Young Scientists to Watch in the Next 20 Years." Gaudi has helped discover over fifty planets with several techniques, with his work earning him coverage in the New York Times, Washington Post, New Scientist, Sky & Telescope, Astronomy and Wired, among others.
