= HD 135530 =

Variable star in the northern constellation Boötes

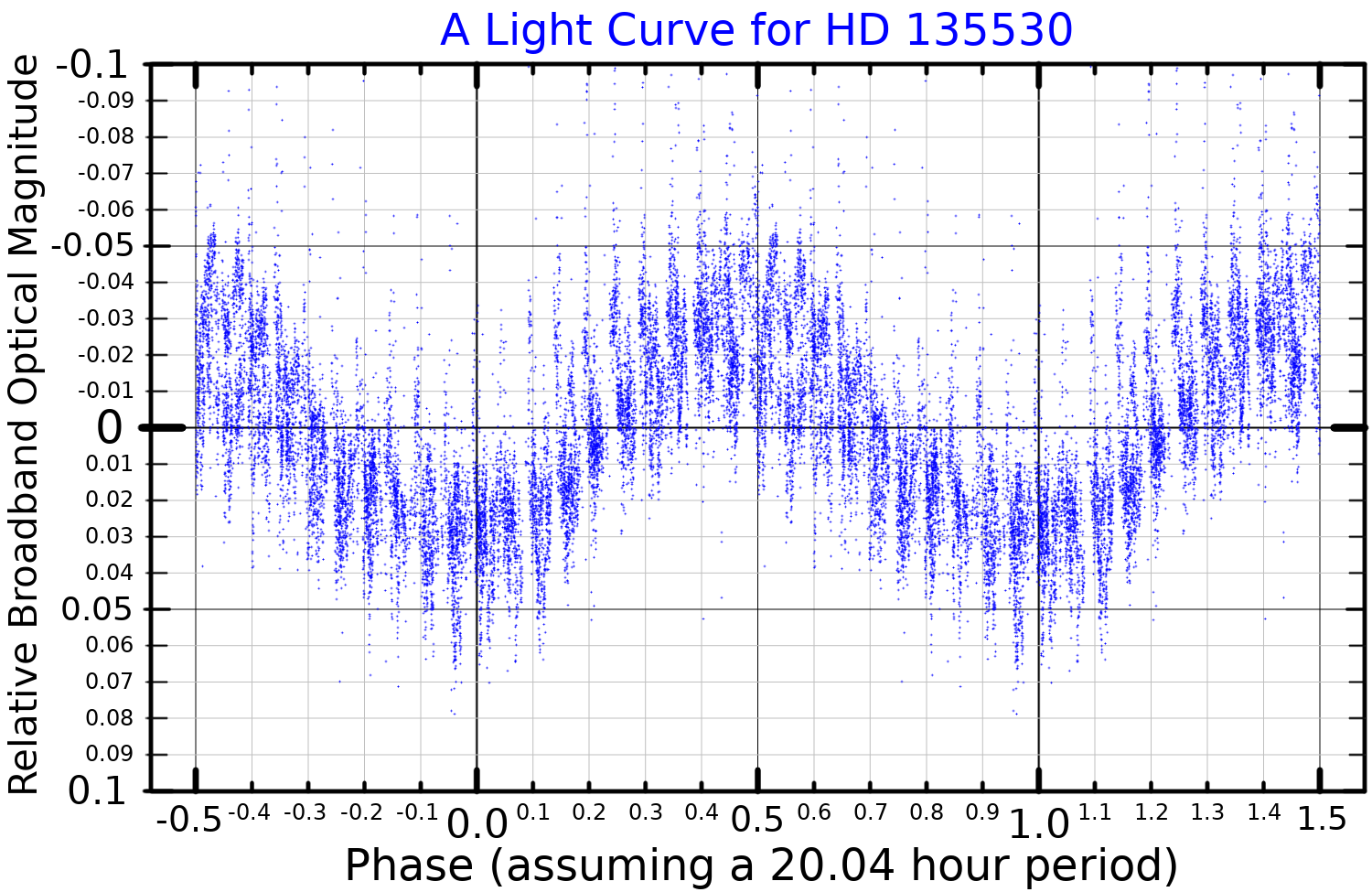
- A light curve for HD 135530, plotted from data published by Burggraaff et al. (2018)

Observation data Epoch J2000 Equinox ICRS
- Constellation: Boötes
- Right ascension: 15^{h} 14^{m} 10.31472^{s}
- Declination: +42° 10′ 17.0573″
- Apparent magnitude (V): 6.13 – 6.15

Characteristics
- Evolutionary stage: AGB
- Spectral type: M2IIIa
- B−V color index: +1.62
- Variable type: unclassified

Astrometry
| Radial velocity (R_{v}) | −4.42±0.21 km/s |
| Proper motion (μ) | RA: 20.065 mas/yr Dec.: −14.631 mas/yr |
| Parallax (π) | 3.1796±0.0484 mas |
| Distance | 1,030 ± 20 ly (315 ± 5 pc) |
| Absolute magnitude (M_{V}) | −1.68 |

Details
| Mass | 1.2 M_{☉} |
| Radius | 79 R_{☉} |
| Luminosity | 1,204 L_{☉} |
| Surface gravity (log g) | 0.56 cgs |
| Temperature | 3,820 K |
| Metallicity [Fe/H] | −0.17 dex |

Other designations
- NSV 20281, BD+42°2577, HD 135530, HIP 74571, HR 5677, SAO 45445

Database references
| SIMBAD | data |

HD 135530 is a variable star in the northern constellation of Boötes. With an average apparent magnitude of 6.14, it is very faintly visible to the naked eye under excellent observing conditions.

HD 135530 has evolved into a red giant on the asymptotic giant branch, meaning that it has exhausted its core helium and is fusing hydrogen and helium in shells outside the core. Its photosphere has expanded to 79 R_{☉} at an effective temperature of 3820 K and shows a spectrum classified as M2IIIa, with IIIa indicating a star slightly more luminous than a typical giant.

Although listed only as a suspected variable in the General Catalogue of Variable Stars, observations by the MASCARA team have shown that its brightness is in fact variable, with a period of about 20 days.
