= KELT-3b =

Exoplanet orbiting KELT-3

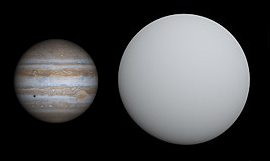
- KELT-3b compared to Jupiter

Discovery
- Discovered by: Pepper et al. 2013
- Discovery date: 2013
- Detection method: Transit

Orbital characteristics
- Semi-major axis: 0.04120 ± 0.00067AU
- Eccentricity: 0.202
- Orbital period (sidereal): 2.7033902 d
- Inclination: 84.25+0.67 −0.64°
- Star: KELT-3

Physical characteristics
- Mean radius: 1.56±0.11R_{J}
- Mass: 1.94±0.33M_{J}
- Temperature: 2132±133

KELT-3b is an extrasolar planet orbiting the F-type main-sequence star KELT-3, 690 light-years away in the constellation Leo Minor. It was discovered in 2013 by KELT's telescope in Arizona.

== Properties ==
This planet has 44% more mass than Jupiter, but has expanded to 1.34 times the radius of the latter. It has a temperature of 1,811 K, which gives it a Hot Jupiter class. KELT-3b has a lower density than Jupiter, and completes a revolution in less in 3 days. This corresponds with an orbital distance of 0.04 AU, which is 10 times closer than Mercury (planet) orbits the Sun.

The planetary equilibrium temperature is 1829±42 K, but measured temperature is hotter at 2132±133 K. The radiation of the moderately active host star KELT-3 do not produce a detectable ionization and consequent Lyman-alpha line emission in the atmosphere of the KELT-3b.

== Discovery ==
KELT-3b was discovered in 2013. The light curves and parameters of both the planet and the star were observed. The paper also states that there is uncertainty about the system’s age.
