= KELT-6b =

Exoplanet orbiting KELT-6

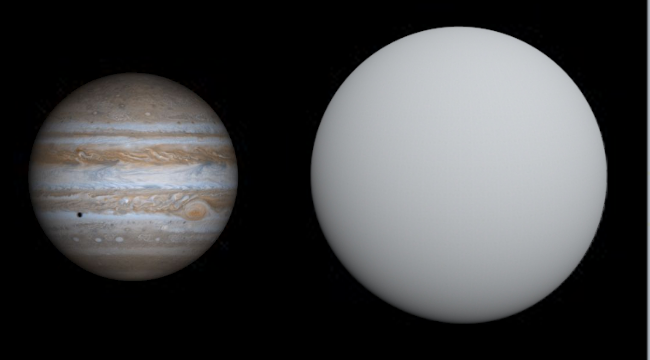
- KELT-6b (white) compared to Jupiter

Discovery
- Discovered by: Collins et al.
- Discovery site: KELTNorth
- Discovery date: 2014
- Detection method: Transit

Orbital characteristics
- Semi-major axis: 0.0804±0.0014 AU
- Eccentricity: 0.22±0.11
- Orbital period (sidereal): 7.8457±0.0002 d
- Inclination: 88.81°±0.85°
- Time of perihelion: 2,456,269.2+1.7 −2.5 JD
- Argument of perihelion: 308°+30° −272°
- Semi-amplitude: 42.8±4.3 km/s
- Star: KELT-6

Physical characteristics
- Mean radius: 1.30±0.09 R_{J}
- Mass: 0.442±0.019 M_{J}
- Mean density: 0.333+0.120 −0.079 g/cm^{3}(0.012+0.004 −0.002 lb/cu in)
- Temperature: 1313+59 −38 K

KELT-6b is an exoplanet orbiting the F-type subgiant KELT-6 approximately 791 light years away in the northern constellation Coma Berenices. It was discovered in 2013 using the transit method, and was announced in 2014.

== Discovery ==
In 2014, the planet's parameters were observed. The paper states that KELT-6 has just entered the subgiant phase, and is no longer on the main sequence. In 2015, an additional planet, c, was discovered using the radial velocity method.

== Properties ==
KELT-6b is a hot Saturn with 44.2% Jupiter's mass, but has been bloated to 1.3 times Jupiter's radius. Its density is half of Saturn's, and it has an equilibrium temperature of 1,313 K, but a hotter dayside temperature of 1,531 K.
