= KELT-24 =

Star in Ursa Major

Observation data Epoch J2000.0 Equinox J2000.0
Constellation	Ursa Major
- KELT-24
Right ascension	10^{h} 47^{m} 38.35063^{s}
Declination	+71° 39′ 21.1525″
- Apparent magnitude (V): 8.33
- KELT-24B
Right ascension	10^{h} 47^{m} 38.38264^{s}
Declination	+71° 39′ 19.1482″

Characteristics

KELT-24
- Evolutionary stage: main sequence
- Spectral type: F5
- Variable type: planetary transit

KELT-24B
- Evolutionary stage: main sequence
- Spectral type: M + M?
- Variable type: eclipsing

Astrometry

KELT-24
Radial velocity (R_{v})	−5.54±0.24 km/s
Proper motion (μ)	RA: −56.061 mas/yr Dec.: −34.526 mas/yr
Parallax (π)	10.3218±0.0180 mas
Distance	316.0 ± 0.6 ly (96.9 ± 0.2 pc)
Absolute magnitude (M_{V})	+3.47

KELT-24B
Proper motion (μ)	RA: −49.897 mas/yr Dec.: −37.516 mas/yr
Parallax (π)	10.6799±0.0892 mas
Distance	305 ± 3 ly (93.6 ± 0.8 pc)

Details

KELT-24
Mass	1.31 M_{☉}
Radius	1.51 R_{☉}
Luminosity	3.54 L_{☉}
Surface gravity (log g)	4.19 cgs
Temperature	6,437 K
Metallicity [Fe/H]	0.17 dex
Rotation	~4 days
Rotational velocity (v sin i)	19.7 km/s
Age	2.8 Gyr

B
Mass	0.52 M_{☉}
Radius	0.48 R_{☉}
Luminosity	0.037 L_{☉}
Surface gravity (log g)	4.78 cgs
Temperature	3,630 K
Metallicity [Fe/H]	0.30 dex
Age	2.8 Gyr

C
Mass	0.51 M_{☉}
Radius	0.49 R_{☉}
Luminosity	0.038 L_{☉}
Surface gravity (log g)	4.77 cgs
Temperature	3,640 K
Metallicity [Fe/H]	−0.31 dex
Age	2.8 Gyr

Other designations
- MASCARA-3, KELT-24, HD 93148, HIP 52796

Database references
SIMBAD	data
- B

KELT-24 (HD 93148, MASCARA-3) is a multiple star system in the constellation Ursa Major at a distance of approximately 316 light-years (about 96.9 parsecs) from Sun. The apparent magnitude of the primary star is +8.33. The star's age is estimated to be about 2.8 billion years. As an F-type main-sequence star, it is similar to the Sun, but slightly hotter, larger, and more luminous.

KELT-24 has a single known exoplanet, a hot Jupiter only 11 R_{☉} from the star.

== Nomenclature ==
This star was first catalogued in the Henry Draper Catalogue as HD 93148. The Henry Draper Catalogue gave stars visible to the naked eye in suitable conditions a designation, indicating that this star can be seen with the naked eye. But in 2019, the Multi-site All-Sky Camera and the Kilodegree Extremely Little Telescope announced the discovery of the exoplanet KELT-24b/MASCARA-3b around this star. Thus, it is most commonly known as KELT-24, although the star is sometimes catalogued as MASCARA-3.

The common proper motion companion is referred to as HD 93148B or KELT-24B, or KELT-24BC when it is being treated as a spectroscopic binary.

== Star system ==
KELT-24 is an 8th-magnitude F-type star with a faint companion separated by 2″. The companion is over-luminous for a normal star of its colour and is suspected to be a binary consisting of two red dwarfs.

KELT-24 is a yellow-white star with a spectral class of F5. Its mass is about 1.3 M_{☉}, its radius is about 1.5 R_{☉}, and its luminosity is about 3.5 L_{☉}. Its effective temperature is about 6,437 K. An age of 2.8 billion years has been calculated, but the 68% confidence interval ranges from 2.0 to 6.9 billion years. Age estimates in the original discovery papers were 0.78 and 2.8 billion years respectively.

KELT-24B, or KELT-24BC when both components are being referred to, is suspected of being an eclipsing binary although only a single "transit-like event" has been observed. The best model fit is two near-identical red dwarfs each with a mass about half the Sun's and a luminosity less than 4% of the Sun's.

== Planetary system ==
In 2019, the discovery of the Hot Jupiter type planet KELT-24b/MASCARA-3b was announced by the Multi-site All-Sky CAmeRA and the Kilodegree Extremely Little Telescope. TESS data confirmed that no additional companions are orbiting this star.

The KELT-24 planetary system
Companion (in order from star)	Mass	Semimajor axis (AU)	Orbital period (days)	Eccentricity	Inclination	Radius
b	4.6 M_{J}	0.0501	5.5515	0.032	89.7°	1.1 R_{J}
