= KELT-21b =

Extrasolar planet

Discovery
- Discovered by: Marshall Johnson et al.
- Discovery site: KELT
- Discovery date: 2018
- Detection method: Transit method

Orbital characteristics
- Semi-major axis: 0.05224 AU (7.815 million km)
- Orbital period (sidereal): 3.6127647 d
- Inclination: 86.46
- Star: KELT-21 A (HD 332124)

Physical characteristics
- Mean radius: 1.586 R_{J}
- Mass: <3.91 M_{J}
- Mean density: <1.24 g cm^{−3}
- Temperature: 2,051 K (1,778 °C; 3,232 °F)

KELT-21b is an extrasolar planet discovered in 2017. It is a hot Jupiter with radius of about 1.586 M_{J}.

== Host star ==
KELT-21b orbits KELT-21 A (HD 332124). It orbits the primary star in a triple star system, with the other two stars located 1.2 arcseconds away. These two stars, designated KELT-21 B and C, have masses of 0.13 M_{☉} and 0.11 M_{☉}, respectively. The primary star is heavy at 1.458±0.029M_{☉}, extremely hot at 8,210±771 K and rapidly rotating (equatorial velocity equal to 141 km/s). In comparison, the Sun has a temperature of 5,772 K and rotates at an equatorial velocity of 1.997 km/s. The planetary orbit is well aligned with the equatorial plane of the host star, with misalignment equal to −5.6^{+1.7}_{−1.9}°.

Transmission planetary spectroscopy was performed in 2021, based on a single transit observation in 2019. High planetary gravity and relatively low planetary temperature made detection of an atmosphere impossible that time.
