= Hydroxy group =

Chemical group (–OH)

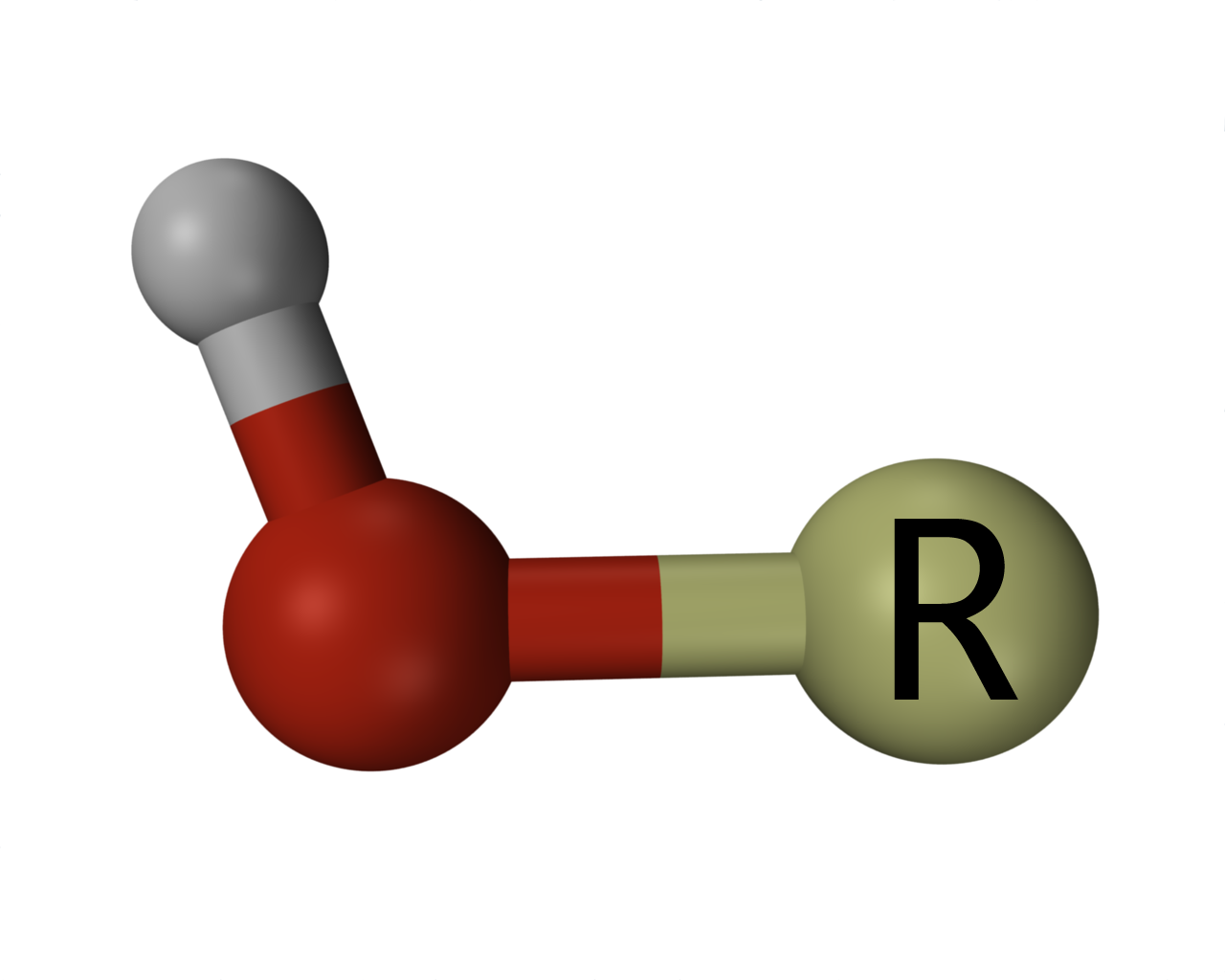
Representation of an organic compound hydroxy group, where R represents a hydrocarbon or other organic moiety, the red and grey spheres represent oxygen and hydrogen atoms respectively, and the rod-like connections between these, covalent bonds.

In chemistry, a hydroxy or hydroxyl group is a functional group with the chemical formula −OH and composed of one oxygen atom covalently bonded to one hydrogen atom. In organic chemistry, alcohols and carboxylic acids contain one or more hydroxy groups. Both the negatively charged anion HO^{−}, called hydroxide, and the neutral radical HO·, known as the hydroxyl radical, consist of an unbonded hydroxy group.

According to IUPAC definitions, the term hydroxyl refers to the hydroxyl radical (·OH) only, while the functional group −OH is called a hydroxy group.

== Properties ==
Sulfuric acid contains two hydroxyl groups.

Water, alcohols, carboxylic acids, and many other hydroxy-containing compounds can be readily deprotonated due to a large difference between the electronegativity of oxygen (3.5) and that of hydrogen (2.1). Hydroxy-containing compounds engage in intermolecular hydrogen bonding increasing the electrostatic attraction between molecules and thus to higher boiling and melting points than found for compounds that lack this functional group. Organic compounds, which are often poorly soluble in water, become water-soluble when they contain two or more hydroxyl groups, as illustrated by sugars and amino acid.

== Occurrence ==
The hydroxy group is pervasive in chemistry and biochemistry. Many inorganic compounds contain hydroxyl groups, including sulfuric acid, the chemical compound produced on the largest scale industrially.

Hydroxy groups participate in the dehydration reactions that link simple biological molecules into long chains. The joining of a fatty acid to glycerol to form a triacylglycerol removes the −OH from the carboxy end of the fatty acid. The joining of two aldehyde sugars to form a disaccharide removes the −OH from the carboxy group at the aldehyde end of one sugar. The creation of a peptide bond to link two amino acids to make a protein removes the −OH from the carboxy group of one amino acid.

== Hydroxyl radical ==
Hydroxyl radicals are highly reactive and undergo chemical reactions that make them short-lived. When biological systems are exposed to hydroxyl radicals, they can cause damage to cells, including those in humans, where they can react with DNA, lipids, and proteins.

== Planetary observations ==
=== Airglow of the Earth ===
The Earth's night sky is illuminated by diffuse light, called airglow, that is produced by radiative transitions of atoms and molecules. Among the most intense such features observed in the Earth's night sky is a group of infrared transitions at wavelengths between 700 nanometers and 900 nanometers. In 1950, Aden Meinel showed that these were transitions of the hydroxyl molecule, OH.

=== Surface of the Moon ===
In 2009, India's Chandrayaan-1 satellite and the National Aeronautics and Space Administration (NASA) Cassini spacecraft and Deep Impact probe each detected evidence of water by evidence of hydroxyl fragments on the Moon. As reported by Richard Kerr, "A spectrometer [the Moon Mineralogy Mapper, also known as "M3"] detected an infrared absorption at a wavelength of 3.0 micrometers that only water or hydroxyl—a hydrogen and an oxygen bound together—could have created." NASA also reported in 2009 that the LCROSS probe revealed an ultraviolet emission spectrum consistent with hydroxyl presence.

On 26 October 2020, NASA reported definitive evidence of water on the sunlit surface of the Moon, in the vicinity of the Clavius crater, obtained by the Stratospheric Observatory for Infrared Astronomy (SOFIA). The SOFIA Faint Object infrared Camera for the SOFIA Telescope (FORCAST) detected emission bands at a wavelength of 6.1 micrometers that are present in water but not in hydroxyl. The abundance of water on the Moon's surface was inferred to be equivalent to the contents of a 12-ounce bottle of water per cubic meter of lunar soil.

The Chang'e 5 probe, which landed on the Moon on 1 December 2020, carried a mineralogical spectrometer that could measure infrared reflectance spectra of lunar rock and regolith. The reflectance spectrum of a rock sample at a wavelength of 2.85 micrometers indicated localized water/hydroxyl concentrations as high as 180 parts per million.

=== Atmosphere of Venus ===
The Venus Express orbiter collected Venus science data from April 2006 until December 2014. In 2008, Piccioni, et al. reported measurements of night-side airglow emission in the atmosphere of Venus made with the Visible and Infrared Thermal Imaging Spectrometer (VIRTIS) on Venus Express. They attributed emission bands in wavelength ranges of 1.40–1.49 micrometers and 2.6–3.14 micrometers to vibrational transitions of OH. This was the first evidence for OH in the atmosphere of any planet other than Earth.

=== Atmosphere of Mars ===
In 2013, OH near-infrared spectra were observed in the night glow in the polar winter atmosphere of Mars by use of the Compact Reconnaissance Imaging Spectrometer for Mars (CRISM).

=== Exoplanets ===
In 2021, evidence for OH in the dayside atmosphere of the exoplanet WASP-33b was found in its emission spectrum at wavelengths between 1 and 2 micrometers. Evidence for OH in the atmosphere of exoplanet WASP-76b was subsequently found. Both WASP-33b and WASP-76b are ultra-hot Jupiters and it is likely that any water in their atmospheres is present as dissociated ions.

== See also ==
- Hydronium
- Ion
- Oxide
- Hydroxylation

== Further ==
- Reece J, Urry L, Cain M, Wasserman S, Minorsky P, Jackson R (2011). "Chapter 4&5". In Berge S, Golden B, Triglia L (eds.). Campbell Biology. Vol. Unit 1 (9th ed.). San Francisco: Pearson Benjamin Cummings. ISBN 978-0-321-55823-7.
