= TOI-1518 =

F0-type star

Observation data Epoch J2000.0 Equinox J2000.0
- Constellation: Cepheus
- Right ascension: 23^{h} 29^{m} 04.22518^{s}
- Declination: +67° 02′ 05.3786″
- Apparent magnitude (V): 8.95

Characteristics
- Evolutionary stage: main sequence
- Spectral type: F0

Astrometry
Radial velocity (R_{v})	−10.22±0.35 km/s
Proper motion (μ)	RA: −7.633 mas/yr Dec.: −4.948 mas/yr
Parallax (π)	4.3672±0.0141 mas
Distance	747 ± 2 ly (229.0 ± 0.7 pc)

Details
Mass	1.79±0.26 M_{☉}
Radius	1.950±0.048 R_{☉}
Surface gravity (log g)	4.1±0.2 cgs
Temperature	7300±100 K
Metallicity [Fe/H]	−0.10±0.12 dex
Rotational velocity (v sin i)	85.1±6.3 km/s

Other designations
- AG+66 1198, BD+66 1610, SAO 20657, PPM 24491, TOI-1518, TIC 427761355, TYC 4292-873-1

Database references
SIMBAD	data
Exoplanet Archive	data

TOI-1518 is a F0-type main sequence star located in the Constellation of Cepheus around 747 light-years from Earth.

== Planetary system ==
TOI-1518b is the only known planet in the system. It is an ultra-hot Jupiter with iron in its atmosphere. The close orbit causes the radius of this planet to be inflated and heat to a temperature of 2492 K.

The TOI-1518 planetary system
Companion (in order from star)	Mass	Semimajor axis (AU)	Orbital period (days)	Eccentricity	Inclination	Radius
b	<2.3 M_{J}	0.0389±0.0011	1.902603(11)	<0.01	77.84+0.23 −0.26°	1.875±0.053 R_{J}
