= TOI-2109 =

F-type star in the constellation Hercules

Observation data Epoch J2000.0 Equinox ICRS
- Constellation: Hercules
- Right ascension: 16^{h} 52^{m} 44.72027^{s}
- Declination: +16° 34′ 47.8400″
- Apparent magnitude (V): 10.22±0.03

Characteristics
- Evolutionary stage: Main sequence
- Spectral type: F

Astrometry
Radial velocity (R_{v})	−22.28±1.23 km/s
Proper motion (μ)	RA: −8.314 mas/yr Dec.: −9.351 mas/yr
Parallax (π)	3.7367±0.0197 mas
Distance	873 ± 5 ly (268 ± 1 pc)

Details
Mass	1.447+0.075 −0.078 M_{☉}
Radius	1.698+0.062 −0.057 R_{☉}
Luminosity	4.71+0.38 −0.27 L_{☉}
Surface gravity (log g)	4.139+0.041 −0.046 cgs
Temperature	6,530+160 −150 K
Metallicity [Fe/H]	0.068+0.070 −0.062 dex
Rotation	1.14 (Note: Calculated using the p sin i of 1.05 days divided by the sine of the inclination, which is 67±6 degrees.) days
Rotational velocity (v sin i)	81.9±1.7 km/s
Age	1.77+0.88 −0.68 Gyr

Other designations
- BD+16 3058, TIC 392476080, TYC 1521-208-1, GSC 01521-00208, 2MASS J16524472+1634478

Database references
SIMBAD	data
Exoplanet Archive	data

TOI-2109 is a magnitude 10.2 star in the constellation of Hercules. It is located 870 ly (268 pc) from Earth based on parallax measurements. This star is host to one confirmed exoplanet.

== Characteristics ==
TOI-2109 is an F-type main-sequence star, a star moderately larger, hotter and more luminous than the Sun that is fusing hydrogen into helium at its core. It is 1.7 times larger than the Sun, comparable to Sirius A, 1.4 times more massive and nearly five times brighter. The effective temperature of its surface is 6,530 K (6,260 °C; 11,290 °F), which is 10% hotter than the Sun, whose temperature measures 5,772 K (5,499 °C; 9,930 °F). The age of TOI-2109 is uncertain, around 1.8 billion years. The rotation period of this star is 14% longer than Earth's day, about 1/25th that of the Sun.

== Planetary system ==
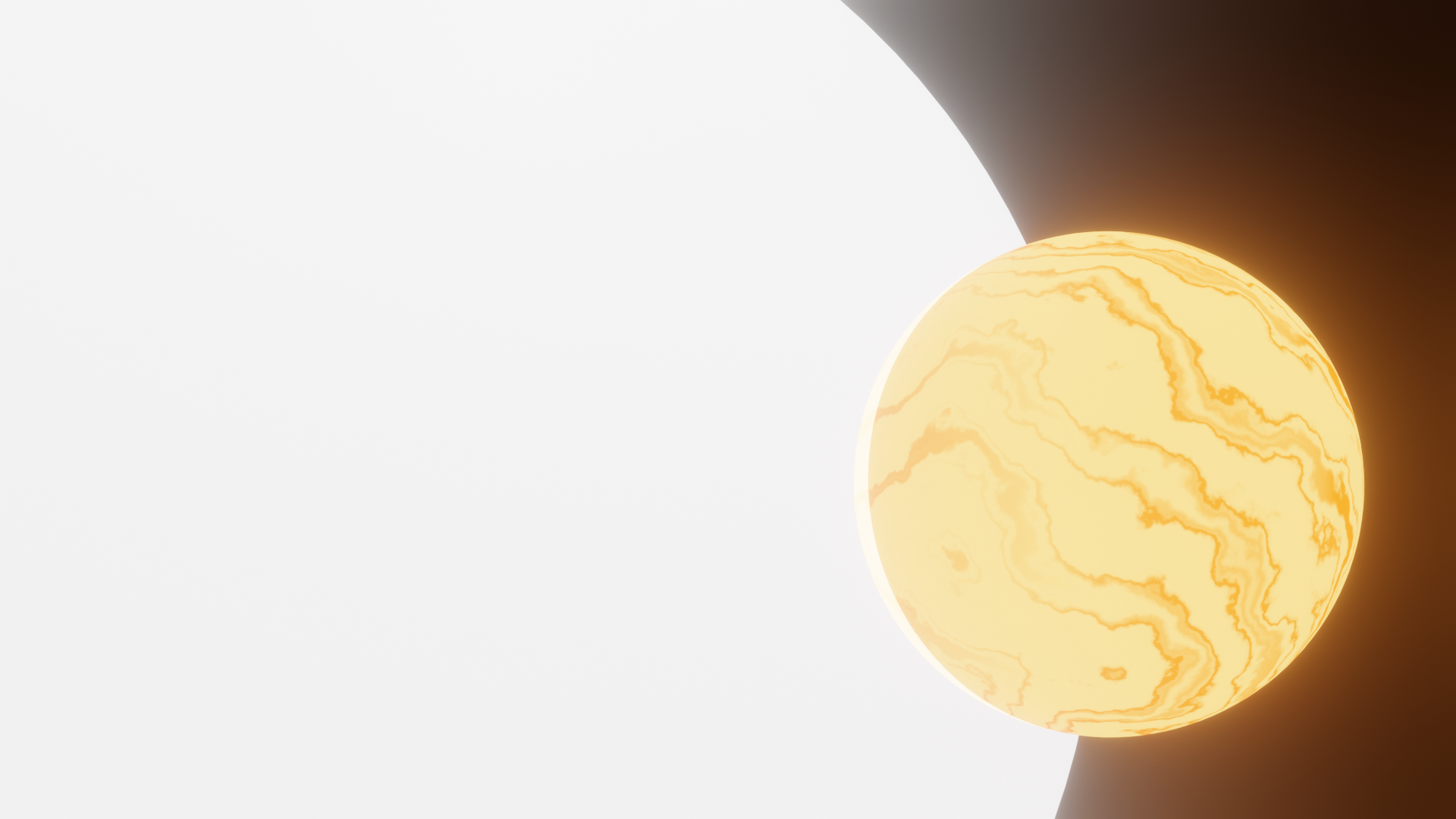
Artist's impression of TOI-2109 b.

TOI-2109 hosts at least one exoplanet, which is named TOI-2109 b and was discovered in 2021 via the transit method.

TOI-2109 b is a hot Jupiter, with the shortest orbital period of its class. It completes an orbit in just 0.67 days (16 hours), being separated by only 0.01791 astronomical units (2,679,000 km) from its host star. The extreme proximity also means TOI-2109 b is strongly irradiated. The dayside temperature measures 3,630 K (3,360 °C; 6,070 °F), while the nightside is around 1,000 degrees cooler, at less than 2,500 K (2,230 °C; 4,040 °F). Only 55 Cancri e and KELT-9b have hotter dayside temperatures. This planet is around 30% larger than Jupiter and five times more massive. Its orbit is well-aligned to the star's axis.

In 2024, low-amplitude transit-timing variations (TTVs) were detected using the CHEOPS space telescope, which could be attributed to a yet unseen exoplanet. This putative planet should have an orbital period greater than 1.125 days and its other characteristics remain unconstrained. In 2026, TTVs of TOI-2109 b were revisited. Five different timing models were compared, in which the two-plaanet model is preferred to the sinusoidal model, showing that the TTVs are best explained by the presence of an additional planet with 0.70 M_{J}.

The TOI-2109 planetary system
Companion (in order from star)	Mass	Semimajor axis (AU)	Orbital period (days)	Eccentricity	Inclination (°)	Radius
b	5.02±0.75 M_{J}	0.01791±0.00065	0.67247414(28)	0	70.74±0.37	1.347±0.047 R_{J}
c (unconfirmed)	0.70±0.02 M_{J}	—	~1.578	—	—	—
