= CD−34 8618 =

F-type dwarf with a planet in Centaurus

CD−34°8618
Observation data Epoch J2000.0 Equinox ICRS
- Constellation: Centaurus
- Right ascension: 13^{h} 04^{m} 10.53393^{s}
- Declination: −35° 32′ 58.3221″
- Apparent magnitude (V): 10.52±0.05

Characteristics
- Evolutionary stage: main sequence
- Spectral type: F1 V
- B−V color index: +0.41
- Variable type: suspected δ Scuti or γ Dor

Astrometry
Radial velocity (R_{v})	−0.53±1.97 km/s
Proper motion (μ)	RA: −18.553 mas/yr Dec.: +1.104 mas/yr
Parallax (π)	2.4238±0.0303 mas
Distance	1,350 ± 20 ly (413 ± 5 pc)

Details
Mass	1.59±0.08 M_{☉}
Radius	1.94±0.08 R_{☉}
Luminosity	8.34 L_{☉}
Surface gravity (log g)	4.05±0.14 cgs
Temperature	6,909 K
Metallicity [Fe/H]	+0.1±0.1 dex
Rotation	<1.81 d
Rotational velocity (v sin i)	52±2 km/s
Age	1.29^{+0.36}_{−0.27} Gyr

Other designations
- CD−34°8618, CPD−34°5491 KELT-13, WASP-167

Database references
SIMBAD	data

CD−34°8618, also known as KELT-13 or WASP-167, is a yellowish-white hued star located in the southern constellation of Centaurus. It has an apparent magnitude of 10.52, making it readily visible in medium sized telescopes, but not to the naked eye. Based on parallax measurements from the Gaia spacecraft, the object is estimated to be approximately 1,350 light years away from the Solar System. It appears to be drifting closer to it, having a radial velocity of −0.53 km/s.

== Description ==
WASP-167 has a stellar classification of F1 V, indicating that it is an ordinary F-type main-sequence star that is generating energy via hydrogen fusion at its core. At present it has 1.59 times the mass of the Sun and 1.94 times the radius of the Sun. It radiates 8.34 times the luminosity of the Sun from its photosphere at an effective temperature of 6,909 K. WASP-167 has an iron abundance 26% above solar levels, making it metal enriched — common among planetary hosts. The object has completed 63% of its main sequence lifetime at an age of 1 billion years. Like many hot stars, WASP-167 spins rapidly, having a projected rotational velocity of 52 km/s, meaning it completes a rotation under 2 days.

== Planetary system ==
A Hot Jupiter was discovered in a tight, 2 day retrograde orbit the star by the SuperWASP and the KELT. WASP-167 was observed to have non-radial pulsations, which might be caused by the planet's close orbit. It has an equilibrium temperature of 2,329±64 K and is nearly tidally locked, similar to Mercury.

The WASP-167/KELT-13 planetary system
Companion (in order from star)	Mass	Semimajor axis (AU)	Orbital period (days)	Eccentricity	Inclination (°)	Radius
WASP-167/KELT-13 b	<8 M_{J}	0.0365±0.0006	2.0219570±0.0000007	0 (assumed)	79.9±0.3	1.58±0.05 R_{J}
