= KELT-2 =

Star in the constellation Auriga

Observation data Epoch J2000 Equinox ICRS
- Constellation: Auriga
- KELT-2A
- Right ascension: 06^{h} 10^{m} 39.345^{s}
- Declination: +30° 57′ 25.71″
- Apparent magnitude (V): 8.77±0.01
- KELT-2B
- Right ascension: 06^{h} 10^{m} 39.258^{s}
- Declination: +30° 57′ 27.85″
- Apparent magnitude (V): 11.9±0.2

Characteristics
- Spectral type: F7 V + K2 V
- Apparent magnitude (G): 8.59 + 11.99
- B−V color index: 0.53

Astrometry

A
| Radial velocity (R_{v}) | −47.38 km/s |
| Proper motion (μ) | RA: 16.865 mas/yr Dec.: −2.155 mas/yr |
| Parallax (π) | 7.4327±0.0217 mas |
| Distance | 439 ± 1 ly (134.5 ± 0.4 pc) |
| Absolute magnitude (M_{V}) | 3.27 |

B
| Radial velocity (R_{v}) | −40.93±2.01 km/s |
| Proper motion (μ) | RA: 17.864±0.026 mas/yr Dec.: −3.589±0.019 mas/yr |
| Parallax (π) | 7.2950±0.0255 mas |
| Distance | 447 ± 2 ly (137.1 ± 0.5 pc) |

Details

A
| Mass | 1.314^{+0.063}_{−0.060} M_{☉} |
| Radius | 1.84^{+0.07}_{−0.05} R_{☉} |
| Luminosity | 3.5 L_{☉} |
| Surface gravity (log g) | 4.03^{+0.02}_{−0.03} cgs |
| Temperature | 6148±48 K |
| Metallicity [Fe/H] | 0.03±0.08 dex |
| Rotation | 12.9^{+0.2}_{−0.5} d |
| Rotational velocity (v sin i) | 9±2 km/s |
| Age | 3.97±0.01 Gyr |

B
| Mass | 0.78 M_{☉} |
| Radius | 0.7 R_{☉} |
| Surface gravity (log g) | 4.65 cgs |
| Temperature | 4850±150 K |

Other designations
- BD+30 1138, HD 42176, HIP 29301, WDS J06107+3057, TYC 2420-899-1, 2MASS J06103935+3057258

Database references
| SIMBAD | HD 42176 |
- HD 42176 B

KELT-2 (also called HD 42176) is a binary star located about 439 light-years away in the constellation Auriga. The apparent magnitude of the system is 8.68, which means it is not visible to the naked eye but can be seen with binoculars. The system is moving towards the Sun at over 40 km/s.

== Description ==
KELT-2A is the primary star in the common-proper-motion binary star system KELT-2 (HD 42176). It is an F-type main sequence star about 1.314 times as massive as the sun. It has about 1.84 times the Sun's radius and radiates 3.5 times the Sun's luminosity at a temperature of about 6148 K. It is 3.97 billion years old and has a rotational velocity of around 9 km/s. KELT-2B is an early K dwarf approximately 295 AU away, which was discovered simultaneously with the planet KELT-2Ab in 2012. It has 78% of the Sun's mass, 70% of its radius, and an effective temperature of 4850±150 K.

== Planetary system ==
This star has one known planet, the extrasolar planet KELT-2Ab, a hot jupiter orbiting the star at an average distance of 0.05504±0.00086 AU with an orbital period of 4.11379±0.00001 days.

The KELT-2 planetary system
| Companion (in order from star) | Mass | Semimajor axis (AU) | Orbital period (days) | Eccentricity | Inclination (°) | Radius |
|---|---|---|---|---|---|---|
| b | 1.524 ± 0.088 M_{J} | 0.05504 ± 0.00086 | 4.113789 ± 0.000009 | 0 | — | 1.290 ± 0.057 R_{J} |

== See also ==
- KELT
