= KELT-3 =

Star in the constellation Leo

Observation data Epoch J2000.0 Equinox J2000.0
- Constellation: Leo Minor
- Right ascension: 09^{h} 54^{m} 34.3869^{s}
- Declination: +40° 23′ 16.974″
- Apparent magnitude (V): 9.82 ± 0.03

Characteristics
- Evolutionary stage: main sequence
- Spectral type: F5IV-V
- Variable type: planetary transit

Astrometry
| Proper motion (μ) | RA: −28.217(20) mas/yr Dec.: −24.068(22) mas/yr |
| Parallax (π) | 4.7860±0.0272 mas |
| Distance | 681 ± 4 ly (209 ± 1 pc) |

Details
| Mass | 1.301±0.046 M_{☉} |
| Radius | 1.583±0.036 R_{☉} |
| Luminosity | 3.04 L_{☉} |
| Surface gravity (log g) | 4.153±0.024 cgs |
| Temperature | 6306^{+36}_{−35} K |
| Metallicity [Fe/H] | 0.030^{+0.072}_{−0.066} dex |
| Age | 3.0 ± 0.2 Gyr |

Other designations
- BD+41 2024, TYC 2996-683-1, 2MASS J09543439+4023170, GSC 02996-00683, SAO 43097

Database references
| SIMBAD | data |
| Exoplanet Archive | data |

KELT-3 is a star in the zodiac constellation Leo Minor. With an apparent magnitude of 9.82, it is too faint to be seen with the naked eye, but can be detected using a telescope. It is currently located around 681 light years away, based on parallax measurements.

== Properties ==
KELT-3 is a late F-type main-sequence star with 27.7% more mass than the Sun, and is slightly larger than the latter. It is radiating 3 times the Sun's luminosity, and has a metallicity similar to the latter. It has an effective temperature of 6,304 K, which gives KELT-3 a yellow-white hue. It's also slightly younger than the Sun, with an age of 3 billion years. There is uncertainty about the star's age, it being an evolved star or not.

Since 2015, the star is suspected to have a stellar companion, at angular separation of 3.762±0.009 arcseconds.

== Planetary system ==
In 2013, KELT discovered an eccentric hot Jupiter transiting the star. In the research paper, it is stated as one of the brightest transiting hosts. The light curves of the star have been observed during transits.

The KELT-3 planetary system
| Companion (in order from star) | Mass | Semimajor axis (AU) | Orbital period (days) | Eccentricity | Inclination | Radius |
|---|---|---|---|---|---|---|
| b | 1.94±0.33 M_{J} | 0.04120 ± 0.00067 | 2.7033902 | 0.202 | 84.25° | 1.458^{+0.042}_{−0.041} R_{J} |

== See also ==
- KELT
