= HD 93396 =

Subgiant with an exoplanet; Sextans

Observation data Epoch J2000.0 Equinox J2000.0
- Constellation: Sextans
- Right ascension: 10^{h} 46^{m} 49.74018^{s}
- Declination: −09° 23′ 56.4955″
- Apparent magnitude (V): 8.04±0.01

Characteristics
- Evolutionary stage: subgiant
- Spectral type: G8/K0 IV
- B−V color index: +0.83
- Variable type: planetary transit

Astrometry
| Radial velocity (R_{v}) | 34.96±0.24 km/s |
| Proper motion (μ) | RA: −79.160 mas/yr Dec.: −78.507 mas/yr |
| Parallax (π) | 10.0049±0.0202 mas |
| Distance | 326.0 ± 0.7 ly (100.0 ± 0.2 pc) |
| Absolute magnitude (M_{V}) | +3.01 |

Details
| Mass | 1.43±0.07 M_{☉} |
| Radius | 2.93±0.15 R_{☉} |
| Luminosity | 6.01^{+0.13}_{−0.07} L_{☉} |
| Surface gravity (log g) | 3.72^{+0.04}_{−0.05} cgs |
| Temperature | 5,375±25 K |
| Metallicity [Fe/H] | +0.17±0.05 dex |
| Rotational velocity (v sin i) | 1.8 km/s |
| Age | 3.48±1.74 Gyr |

Other designations
- KELT-11, BD−08°2999, HD 93396, HIP 52733, SAO 137780, TOI-664, TIC 55092869

Database references
| SIMBAD | data |

HD 93396 (HIP 52733; TOI-664; KELT-11) is a star located in the equatorial constellation Sextans. It has an apparent magnitude of 8.04, making it readily visible in binoculars, but not to the naked eye. The object is located relatively close at a distance of 326 light-years based on Gaia DR3 parallax measurements, but it is receding with a heliocentric radial velocity of 34.96 km/s. At its current distance, HD 93396's brightness is diminished by an interstellar extinction of 0.17 magnitudes and it has an absolute magnitude of +3.01.

HD 93396 has a stellar classification of G8/K0 IV, indicating that it is an evolved star with the characteristics of a G8 and K0 subgiant. At the age of 3.48 billion years, it is currently in the Hertzsprung gap, meaning that the star is in the process of ceasing hydrogen fusion at its stellar core and it is evolving towards the red giant branch. It has 1.43 times the mass of the Sun and a slightly enlarged radius 2.93 times that of the Sun's. It radiates 6.01 times the luminosity of the Sun from its photosphere at an effective temperature of 5,375 K, giving it a yellowish-orange hue when viewed in the night sky. Like many planetary hosts, HD 93396 is metal enriched, having an iron abundance of [Fe/H] = +0.17 or 148% that of the Sun's. It spins slowly with a projected rotational velocity of 1.8 km/s.

HD 93396 has a proper motion companion, a K-dwarf star with 0.69 times the mass of the Sun. It has an angular separation of 1,266 arcseconds (0.35 degrees) from its primary across a position angle of 100°. At the system's distance, this separation translates to a physical projected separation of 126,500 astronomical units (2.0 ly; 0.61 pc).

== Planetary system ==
In 2017, a sub-Saturn exoplanet was discovered transiting the star using the Kilodegree Extremely Little Telescope. It orbits very close to the star within a period of 4 days. Although the planet only has 17% the mass of Jupiter, it is 35% larger than the jovian planet, making it one of the most inflated and least dense exoplanets. Subsequent observations revealed that the planet's atmosphere contains water vapor and a high abundance of titanium and aluminum oxides.

The KELT-11/HD 93396 planetary system
| Companion (in order from star) | Mass | Semimajor axis (AU) | Orbital period (days) | Eccentricity | Inclination (°) | Radius |
|---|---|---|---|---|---|---|
| KELT-11b | 0.171±0.015 M_{J} | 0.0625^{+0.0030}_{−0.0029} | 4.7362034±0.0000083 | 0 (fixed) | 85.8^{+2.4}_{−1.8} | 1.35±0.10 R_{J} |
