= KELT-20b =

Exoplanet orbiting KELT-20

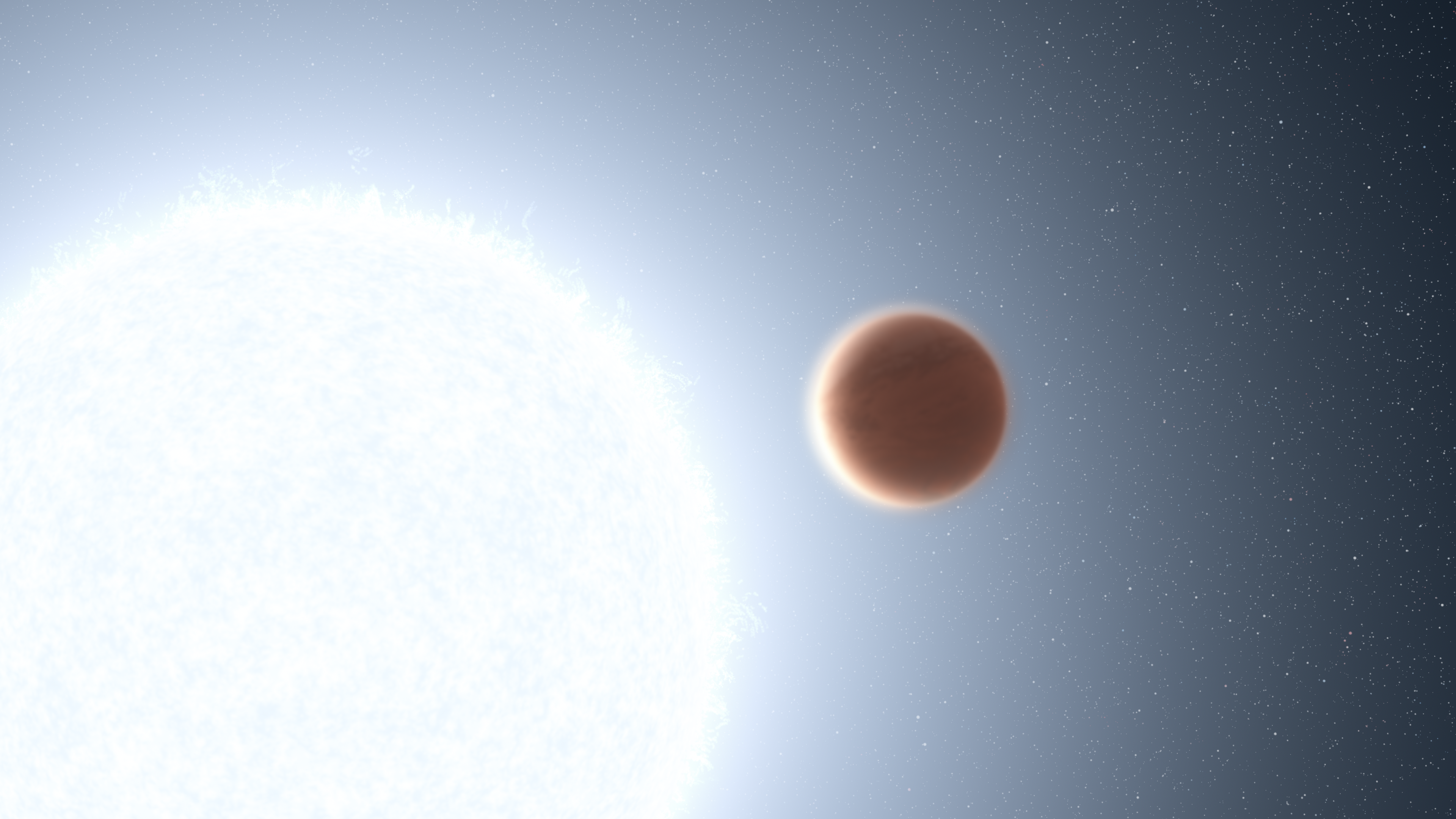
- An artist's impression of ultra-hot Jupiter planet KELT-20b orbiting its host star.

Discovery
- Discovery site: KELT
- Discovery date: 2017
- Detection method: Transit method

Orbital characteristics
- Semi-major axis: 0.0542 AU
- Orbital period (sidereal): 3.6127647 d = 3.474
- Inclination: 86.12
- Star: KELT-20

Physical characteristics
- Mean radius: 1.821 R_{J}
- Mass: 3.355 M_{J}
- Mean density: 0.737 g cm^{−3}

KELT-20b, also known as MASCARA-2b, is an exoplanet announced in 2017. It is an Ultra-hot Jupiter orbiting an A-type star. The carbon monoxide, steam and neutral iron detection in the atmosphere of KELT-20b was announced in 2022.

== Host star ==
The host star is an A-type main-sequence star in the constellation of Cygnus having 2.282 solar masses, 1.617 solar radius and an apparent magnitude of 7.58.

== See also ==
- Kilodegree Extremely Little Telescope
- Multi-site All-Sky CAmeRA
