= HD 15082 =

Star in the constellation Andromeda

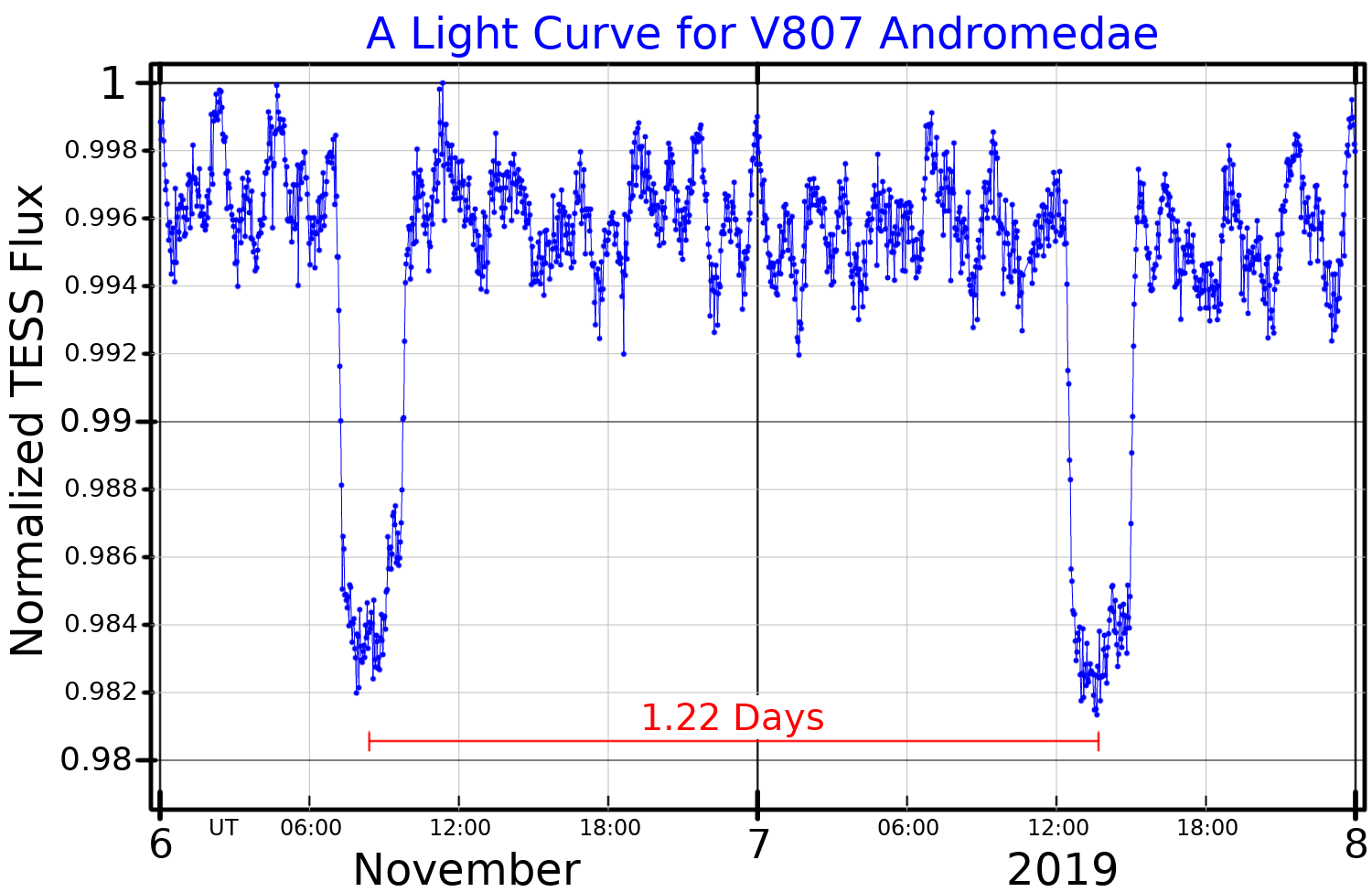
- A light curve for V807 Andromedae (HD 15082), plotted from TESS data. The deep minima are caused by the planet transits.

Observation data Epoch J2000 Equinox ICRS
- Constellation: Andromeda
- Right ascension: 02^{h} 26^{m} 51.0583^{s}
- Declination: +37° 33′ 01.736″
- Apparent magnitude (V): 8.3

Characteristics
- Evolutionary stage: main sequence
- Spectral type: kA5hA8mF4
- B−V color index: 0.27
- Variable type: δ Sct+planetary transit

Astrometry
| Radial velocity (R_{v}) | −2.70±0.33 km/s |
| Proper motion (μ) | RA: −0.977(35) mas/yr Dec.: −8.895(34) mas/yr |
| Parallax (π) | 8.2238±0.0327 mas |
| Distance | 397 ± 2 ly (121.6 ± 0.5 pc) |
| Absolute magnitude (M_{V}) | +2.85 |

Details
| Mass | 1.495±0.031 M_{☉} |
| Radius | 1.444±0.034 R_{☉} |
| Luminosity | 6.6 L_{☉} |
| Surface gravity (log g) | 4.3±0.2 cgs |
| Temperature | 7,430±100 K |
| Metallicity [Fe/H] | 0.1±0.2 dex |
| Rotational velocity (v sin i) | 86 km/s |
| Age | 100 Myr |

Other designations
- V807 And, BD+36 489, HD 15082, HIP 11397, SAO 55561, TOI-1599, TIC 129979528, WASP-33, 2MASS J02265106+3733017

Database references
| SIMBAD | data |
| Exoplanet Archive | data |

HD 15082 (also known as WASP-33) is a star located 397 light years away in the northern constellation of Andromeda. The star is a Delta Scuti variable and a planetary transit variable. A hot Jupiter type extrasolar planet, named WASP-33b or HD 15082b, orbits this star with an orbital period of 1.22 days. It is the first Delta Scuti variable known to host a planet.

== Properties ==
HD 15082 is an Am star, which makes its stellar classification challenging to discern. The hydrogen lines and effective temperature of the star are similar to spectral type A8, however the calcium II K line resembles that of an A5 star, and the metallic lines are more similar to an F4 star. The spectral type is written kA5hA8mF4. The star is about 100 million years old and is spinning with a projected rotational velocity of 86 km/s. It has 1.55 times the mass of the Sun and 1.51 times the Sun's radius.

The intrinsic variability of HD 15082 was discovered in 2011 by Enrique Herrero et al. Delta Scuti variables usually exhibit many pulsation modes, and HD 15082 is no exception, with 8 measured high frequency p-modes. Another proposed non-radial mode, which could be induced by tidal interactions with the planet, would make this star also a Gamma Doradus variable. This star has the GCVS variable star designation V807 Andromedae.

== Planetary system ==
In 2010, the SuperWASP project announced the discovery of an exoplanet, designated WASP-33b, orbiting the star. The discovery was made by detecting the transit of the planet as it passes in front of its star, an event which occurs every 1.22 days. It had first been identified as a planetary candidate in 2006.

The HD 15082 planetary system
| Companion (in order from star) | Mass | Semimajor axis (AU) | Orbital period (days) | Eccentricity | Inclination (°) | Radius |
|---|---|---|---|---|---|---|
| b | 2.093±0.139 M_{J} | 0.0239±0.00063 | 1.21987089(15) | 0 | 86.63±0.03 | 1.593±0.074 R_{J} |
