= Winer Observatory =

Astronomical observatory

Coordinates: 31°39′56.08″N 110°36′6.42″W

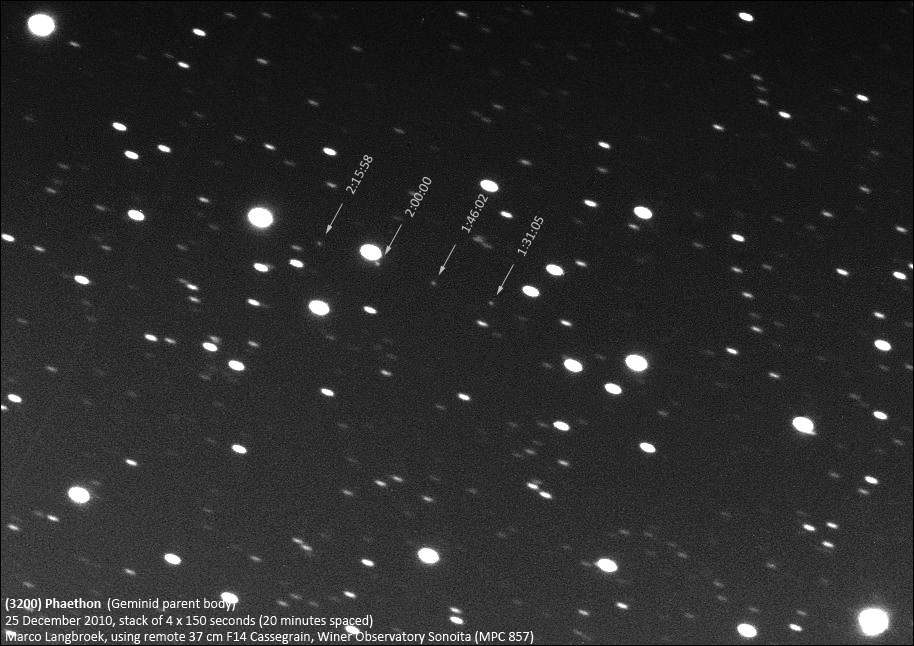
Asteroid 3200 Phaethon, parent body of the Geminids, imaged on 25 Dec 2010 with the 37 cm F14 Cassegrain telescope of Winer Observatory, Sonoita (MPC 857)

Winer Observatory is an astronomical observatory near Sonoita, Arizona in the United States. It is a private, non-profit observatory, operated by Mark and Pat Trueblood since 1983. It has been the site of a number of significant small telescopes and famous robotic telescopes, including the Iowa Robotic Observatory, Michael Schwartz's supernova survey telescope (until Tenagra Observatories opened a facility in the area), and the Kilodegree Extremely Little Telescope that discovered over 30 exoplanets. It now houses the Iowa telescope, a telescope owned by a university in Poland, and the Sutter Survey telescope owned by asteroid mining company TransAstra.

== See also ==
- List of observatories
