= MASCARA =

Exoplanet experiment by Leiden University

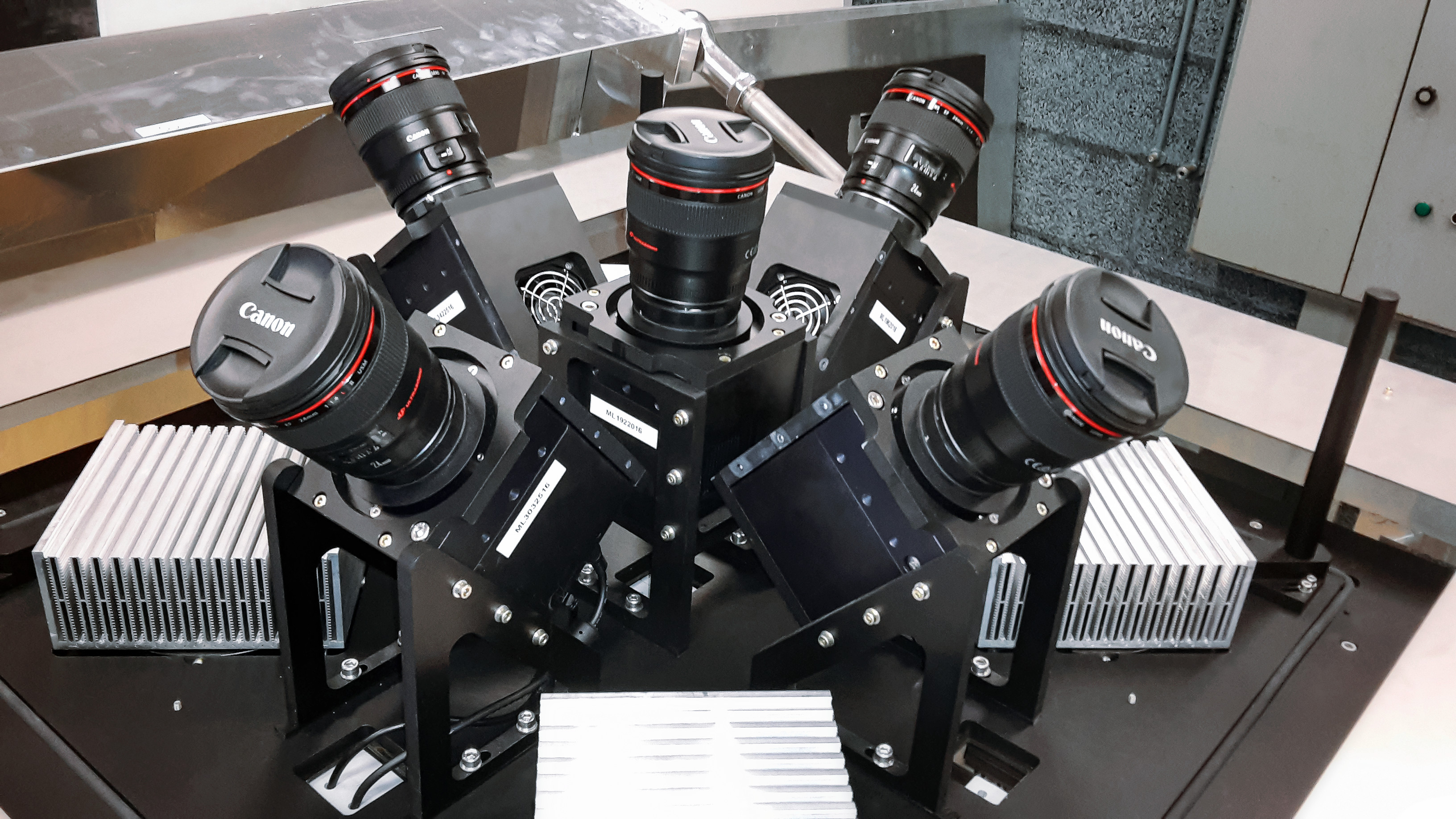
- The five cameras that form the MASCARA system installed at La Silla Observatory
- Alternative names: Multi-site All-Sky CAmeRA
- Location: Spain, Chile
- Coordinates: 29°15′25″S 70°44′16″W
- Website: mascara1.strw.leidenuniv.nl
- Location within Chile
- Related media on Commons

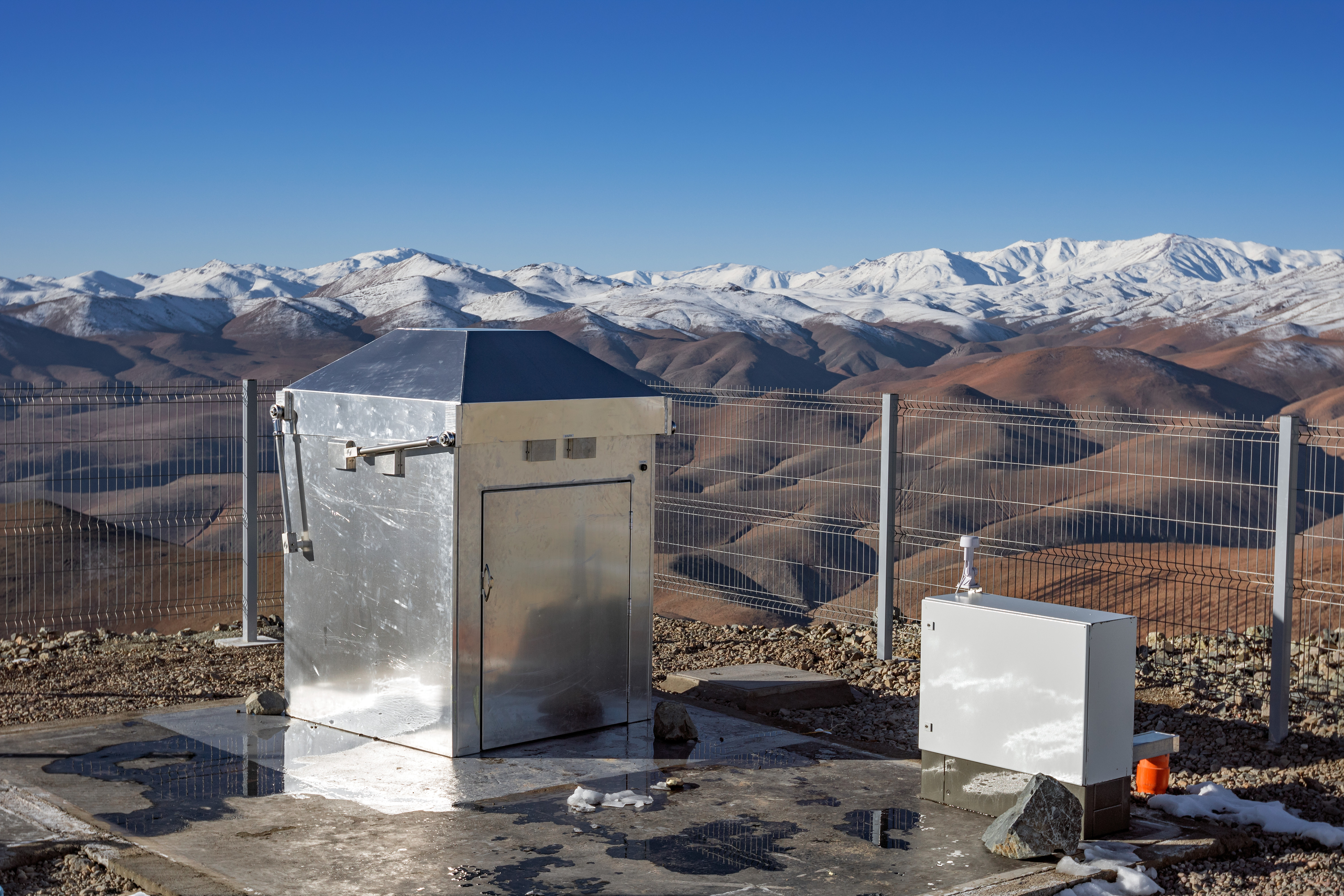
The compact housing of MASCARA at La Silla Observatory

MASCARA (Multi-site All-Sky CAmeRA) is an exoplanet experiment by Leiden University. It has two stations, one in each hemisphere, each of which use cameras to make short exposure photographs of most of the visible sky to observe stars to a magnitude of 8.4. The Northern Hemisphere station at Roque de los Muchachos Observatory, La Palma, started observations in February 2015. The Southern Hemisphere station at La Silla Observatory, Chile, saw first light in July 2017.

== MASCARA-1b ==
On 17 July 2017, the discovery of MASCARA-1b, a confirmed superjovian exoplanet with a mass 3.7M_{J}, was reported by the survey team. MASCARA-1b is a hot Jupiter transiting its parent A-type star; its orbit is misaligned with the star's rotation. The planet was found unusually reflective for hot Jupiter with the measured geometric albedo of 0.171^{+0.066}_{−0.068} and dayside temperature of 3062^{+66}_{−68} K. Attempts to spectroscopically characterize its composition were failing as in 2022 due to relatively high planetary surface gravity resulting in compact atmosphere.

== MASCARA-2b ==
A second planet, MASCARA-2b, also known as KELT-20b, was also announced in 2017. It is a hot Jupiter orbiting an A-type star. The carbon monoxide, steam and neutral iron detection in the atmosphere of MASCARA-2b was announced in 2022.

== MASCARA-4b ==
A planet MASCARA-4b (also known as HD 85628 Ab) discovery was announced in 2019. It is a hot Jupiter on retrograde and slightly eccentric orbit. The planet is unusually reflective for a hot Jupiter. Hydrogen, sodium, magnesium, calcium and iron emission from planetary atmosphere was detected.

== MASCARA-5b ==
In 2021, a planet MASCARA-5b (more commonly known as TOI-1431 b), is an Ultra-hot Jupiter. Its dayside temperature is 2,700 K (2,427 °C), making it hotter than 40% of stars in our galaxy. The nightside temperature is 2,600 K (2,300 °C).

== List of discovered exoplanets ==
Star	Constellation	Right ascension	Declination	App. mag.	Distance (ly)	Spectral type	Planet	Mass (M_{J})	Radius (R_{J})	Orbital period (d)	Semimajor axis (AU)	Orbital eccentricity	Inclination (°)	Discovery year
MASCARA-1	Equuleus	21^{h} 10^{m} 12.4^{s}	+10° 44′ 20″	8.3	188.7	A8	b	3.7	1.5	2.14878	0.043	0	87	2017
MASCARA-2	Cygnus	19^{h} 38^{m} 38.7^{s}	+31° 13′ 09″	7.58	137	A2V	b	3.518	1.83	3.4741085	0.0542	0.0	86.2	2017
MASCARA-3	Ursa Major	10^{h} 47^{m} 38^{s}	+71° 39′ 21″	8.4	96.79	F5	b	5.18	1.272	5.5514926	0.06971	89.16	83.11	2019
MASCARA-4	Carina	09^{h} 50^{m} 19.2^{s}	−66° 06′ 50″	86.7	171.54	A3V	b	3.1	1.53	2.82406	0.047	0	88.81	2019
MASCARA-5	Cepheus	21^{h} 04^{m} 49^{s}	+55° 35′ 17″	8	149.6	AmC	b	3.14	1.508	2.65022	0.047	0.01	80.4	2021

== Papers ==
- G.J.J. Talens et al., The Multi-site All-Sky CAmeRA: Finding transiting exoplanets around bright (m_{V} < 8) stars, accepted for publication in A&A arXiv:1702.03931
