= TOI-1518b =

Ultra-hot Jupiter

Discovery
- Discovery date: 2021
- Detection method: Transit

Orbital characteristics
- Semi-major axis: 0.0389±0.0011 AU
- Eccentricity: 0.01
- Orbital period (sidereal): 1.902603±0.000011 d
- Inclination: 77.84°
- Star: TOI-1518

Physical characteristics
- Mean diameter: 1.875±0.053 R_{J}
- Mass: 2.3 M_{J}
- Temperature: 2492±38 K

TOI-1518b is an ultra-hot Jupiter that orbits around a bright A-F-type main sequence star named TOI-1518 located around 736 light years from Earth. The planet has a mass of 2.4 Jupiter masses and an inflated radius of 1.7 Jupiter radii. It orbits around TOI-1518 at a distance of 0.038 AU taking 1.9 days to complete an orbit. It has an eccentricity of 0.01 and an inclination of 77.84°. Its close orbit to the star makes it highly irradiated with a temperature of 2492 Kelvin.

Iron has been detected in the atmosphere of TOI-1518b. It is a promising candidate for future emission spectroscopy to probe for a thermal inversion. This is due to the highly inflated atmosphere and the brightness of the host star.
