= KELT-6 =

Star in the constellation Coma Berenices

Observation data Epoch J2000 Equinox ICRS
- Constellation: Coma Berenices
- Right ascension: 13^{h} 03^{m} 55.65^{s}
- Declination: +30° 38′ 24.3″
- Apparent magnitude (V): 10.34±0.05

Characteristics
- Evolutionary stage: main sequence
- Spectral type: F8IV-V

Astrometry
Radial velocity (R_{v})	1.62±0.27 km/s
Proper motion (μ)	RA: −4.960±0.014 mas/yr Dec.: +15.722±0.011 mas/yr
Parallax (π)	4.1062±0.0176 mas
Distance	794 ± 3 ly (244 ± 1 pc)

Details
Mass	1.13±0.06 M_{☉}
Radius	1.53±0.14 R_{☉}
Luminosity	3.25+0.94 −0.81 L_{☉}
Surface gravity (log g)	4.07±0.06 cgs
Temperature	6,272±61 K
Metallicity [Fe/H]	−0.28 dex
Rotational velocity (v sin i)	4.53±0.26 km/s
Age	4.9+0.7 −0.5 Gyr

Other designations
- BD+31 2447, Gaia DR3 1464700950221781504

Database references
SIMBAD	data
Exoplanet Archive	data

KELT-6, also known as BD+31 2447, is a star in the constellation Coma Berenices. With an apparent magnitude of 10.34, it is impossible to see with the unaided eye, but can be seen with a powerful telescope. The star is located about 794 light years away from the Solar System based on parallax, but is drifting away with a radial velocity of 1.62 km/s.

== Properties ==
KELT-6 is an F-type star that is 13% more massive and 53% larger than the Sun. It radiates at 3.25 times the Sun's luminosity from its photosphere at an effective temperature of 6,727 K. KELT-6 has a projected rotational velocity of 4.53 km/s, and is slightly older than the Sun, with an age of 4.9 billion years. Unlike most host stars of exoplanets, it has a poor metallicity, with 52.5% the abundance of heavy metals compared to the Sun.

== Planetary system ==
In 2013, a long period "hot Jupiter" was discovered orbiting the star using the transit method. Another planet was discovered in 2015 using the radial velocity (doppler spectroscopy) method.

The KELT-6 planetary system
Companion (in order from star)	Mass	Semimajor axis (AU)	Orbital period (days)	Eccentricity	Inclination (°)	Radius
b	0.44±0.02 M_{J}	0.08±0.00	7.85±0.00	0.22±0.11	88.81±0.85	1.18±0.11 R_{J}
c	3.71±0.21 M_{J}	2.39±0.11	1,276+81 −67	0.21±0.04	—	—

== See also ==
- List of most luminous stars
- List of most massive stars
- Lists of stars
- Lists of stars by constellation
