= TOI-1431 b =

Exoplanet

Discovery
- Discovered by: TESS, MASCARA
- Discovery date: 2021
- Detection method: Transit

Orbital characteristics
- Semi-major axis: 0.046
- Eccentricity: 0
- Orbital period (sidereal): 2.7 d
- Inclination: 80.4
- Star: TOI-1431

Physical characteristics
- Mean radius: 1.49 R_{J}
- Mass: 3.12 M_{J}
- Temperature: 2700±2600 K

TOI-1431 b, also known as MASCARA-5b, is an ultra-hot Jupiter exoplanet orbiting TOI-1431 in the constellation of Cepheus. It has an orbital period of 2.7 days. Its dayside temperature is 2,700 K (2,430 °C; 4,400 °F), making it hotter than 40% of stars in the Milky Way. The nightside temperature is 2,600 K (2,330 °C; 4,220 °F).
