= KELT (FM) =

Radio station in Encinal, Texas

- Encinal, Texas; United States
- Broadcast area: Rural La Salle County, Texas; Rural Webb County, Texas
- Frequency: 102.5 MHz
- Branding: KJ316

Programming
- Language: English
- Format: Christian Contemporary Music

Ownership
- Owner: Mildred Jean Leyendecker, Executor

History
- First air date: 2010
- Call sign meaning: EncinaL, Texas

Technical information
- Licensing authority: FCC
- Facility ID: 170502
- Class: A
- ERP: 100 watts 4,700 watts (CP)
- HAAT: 32 meters (105 ft); 58 meters (190 ft)
- Transmitter coordinates: 28°02′31″N 99°21′10″W

Links
- Public license information: Public file; LMS
- Webcast: listen live

KELT (102.5 FM) The call letters KELT stand for K Encinal Laredo Texas is an American commercial radio station licensed in 2010 to serve the community of Encinal, Texas. The station's broadcast license is held by Mildred Jean Leyendecker. The station broadcasts Christian contemporary music for the southern rural La Salle and northern Webb counties region. It currently has a construction permit to broadcast at a higher ERP.
