= KELT-10b =

Exoplanet in the Telescopium constellation

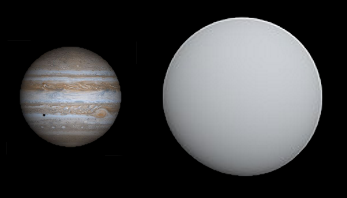
- KELT-10b (white) compared to Jupiter

Discovery
- Discovered by: Kuhn et al. 2016
- Discovery site: South African Astronomical Observatory (KELTSouth)
- Discovery date: around 2016
- Detection method: Transit

Orbital characteristics
- Semi-major axis: 0.0525 AU
- Orbital period (sidereal): 4.16±0.00 d
- Inclination: 88.61°+0.86° −0.74°
- Time of perihelion: 2,457,066±0 JD
- Semi-amplitude: 80±3 m/s
- Star: KELT-10

Physical characteristics
- Mean radius: 1.399+0.069 −0.049 R_{J}
- Mass: 0.68±0.04 M_{J}
- Mean density: 0.31+0.03 −0.04 g/cm^{3} (0.01±0.00 lb/cu in)
- Temperature: 1,377+28 −23 K

KELT-10b is an exoplanet orbiting the G-type main-sequence star KELT-10 approximately 618 light-years away in the southern constellation Telescopium. It was discovered using the transit method, and was announced in 2016.

== Discovery ==
KELT-10b was discovered by a group of scientists at the SAAO using the KELT-South telescope. The light curves and parameters of the system were observed, and it is predicted that due to the host's activity and evolution state along the HR Diagram, the planet is bloated. KELT-10b is part of a group of exoplanets that will be observed by the ESA mission ARIEL.

== Properties ==
KELT-10b has 68% the mass of Jupiter, but is about 40% larger than the Jovian planet. The planet is less dense than Jupiter due to its mass, and has an equilibrium temperature of 1,377 K. KELT-10b has a typical four-day orbit around its host at a separation about ten times greater than Mercury, but is unknown if it's orbiting on a circular or an elliptical one. Observations of the planet with the Very Large Telescope resulted in the discovery of the presence of sodium in the atmosphere.

== See also ==
- List of largest exoplanets
- List of nearest exoplanets
- List of potentially habitable exoplanets
