= KELT-10 =

Star in the constellation Telescopium

Observation data Epoch J2000.0 Equinox ICRS
- Constellation: Telescopium
- Right ascension: 18^{h} 58^{m} 11.6095^{s}
- Declination: −47° 00′ 11.664″
- Apparent magnitude (V): +10.62

Characteristics
- Spectral type: G0 V
- B−V color index: +0.72
- Variable type: PT

Astrometry
Radial velocity (R_{v})	31.61±1.29 km/s
Proper motion (μ)	RA: +1.464 mas/yr Dec.: −15.600 mas/yr
Parallax (π)	5.2834±0.0174 mas
Distance	617 ± 2 ly (189.3 ± 0.6 pc)

Details
Mass	1.07+0.12 −0.15 M_{☉}
Radius	1.21^{+0.05}_{−0.03} R_{☉}
Luminosity	1.40±0.02 L_{☉}
Surface gravity (log g)	4.32+0.02 −0.03 cgs
Temperature	5,948±74 K
Metallicity [Fe/H]	+0.1±0.1 dex
Age	4.5±0.7 Gyr

Other designations
- CD−47°12635, KELT-10, TIC 269217040, Gaia DR2 6710517793025165696

Database references
SIMBAD	data

KELT-10, also known as CD−47°12635, is a sun-like star in the southern constellation Telescopium. It has an apparent magnitude of 10.62, making it readily visible in telescopes, but not to the naked eye. Parallax measurements from the Gaia spacecraft place the star at a distance of 617 light years; it is currently receding with a radial velocity of 31.6 km/s.

KELT-10 has a stellar classification of G0 V, indicating that it is a yellow dwarf like the Sun. However, the object is 7% more massive and 21% larger. It is also slightly hotter, with an effective temperature of 5,948 K compared to the Sun's of 5,778 K. The star has a similar age, with an age of 4.5 billion years and more luminous, having a luminosity 40% greater. KELT-10's iron abundance is 123% that of the Sun, consistent with a planetary host. However, this amount is poorly constrained.

== Planetary system ==
In 2015, a "hot Jupiter" orbiting the star was discovered by the KELT-South telescope. KELT-10b orbits at a distance 10 time closer than Mercury orbits the Sun, and is bloated due to its orbit.

The KELT-10 planetary system
Companion (in order from star)	Mass	Semimajor axis (AU)	Orbital period (days)	Eccentricity	Inclination (°)	Radius
b	0.68±0.04 M_{J}	0.052±0.001	4.1662739±0.0000063	0 (assumed)	88.61^{+0.86}_{−0.74}	1.4±0.1 R_{J}
