= KELT-11b =

Exoplanet

Discovery
- Discovery date: July 6, 2016
- Detection method: transit

Orbital characteristics
- Semi-major axis: 0.06229 AU (9,318,000 km)
- Orbital period (sidereal): 4.736529 d
- Star: HD 93396

Physical characteristics
- Mean radius: 1.37+0.15 −0.12 R_{J}
- Mass: 0.195+0.019 −0.018 M_{J}
- Mean density: 0.093+0.028 −0.024 g/cm^{3}
- Surface gravity: 2.55 m/s^{2}; 0.260 g_{0}
- Temperature: 1712+51 −46

KELT-11b is an exoplanet orbiting around the yellow subgiant star KELT-11 (HD 93396) about 320 light-years away from Earth. It is an inflated planet, one of the "puffiest planets" (lowest-density) known, as a result of its close orbiting distance with its parent star. It has a radius 1.37 times that of Jupiter, but only 19% of its mass. It was discovered in 2016.

The transmission spectrum study in 2020 have revealed the KELT-11b atmosphere containing sub-solar amount of water vapor, but significant amounts of hydrogen cyanide, together with oxides of titanium and aluminum. Also, the nightside flux do indicate a generally cloud-free atmosphere with an effective heat redistribution between dayside and nightside. Later studies have indicated the hydrogen cyanide spectral features are not well distinguished from spectral lines of carbon dioxide and carbon monoxide, although carbon dioxide seems to be present in larger amounts, indicating a high carbon/oxygen ratio of the planet.
