= WASP-33b =

Hot Jupiter orbiting HD 15082

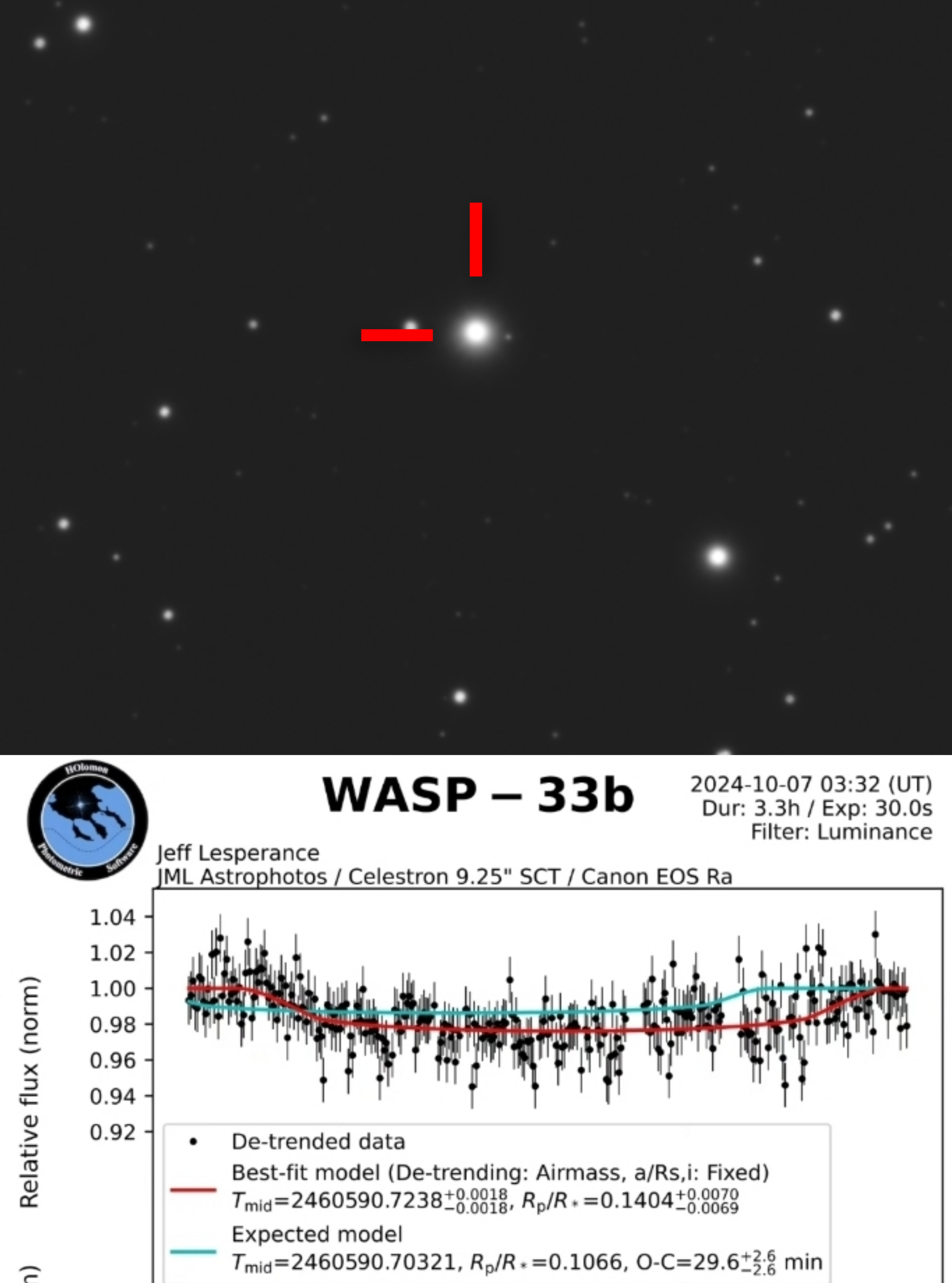
- Photo and light curve of the star HD 15082 (red crosshairs) as exoplanet WASP-33b transits

Discovery
- Discovered by: WASP
- Discovery date: 2010
- Detection method: Transit

Orbital characteristics
- Semi-major axis: 0.02555 ± 0.00017 AU (3,822,200 ± 25,432 km)
- Orbital period (sidereal): 1.21987089 ± 0.00000015 days (105,396.845 ± 0.013 s; 29.2769014 ± 3.6×10^{−6} h)
- Inclination: 87.67±1.81°
- Semi-amplitude: 0.59 km/s (1,300 mph)
- Star: HD 15082

Physical characteristics
- Mean radius: 1.497±0.095 R_{J}
- Mass: 2.81±0.53 M_{J}
- Albedo: 0.369±0.050
- Temperature: 2,710 ± 50 K (2,440 ± 50.0 °C; 4,420 ± 90.0 °F)

WASP-33b is an extrasolar planet orbiting the star HD 15082. It was the first transiting planet discovered to orbit a Delta Scuti variable star. With a semimajor axis of 0.026 AU (3.9 million km; 2.4 million mi) and a mass likely greater than Jupiter's, it belongs to the hot Jupiter class of planets.

== Discovery ==
In 2010, the SuperWASP project announced the discovery of an extrasolar planet orbiting the star HD 15082. The discovery was made by detecting the transit of the planet as it passes in front of its star, an event that occurs every 1.22 days.

== Orbit ==
A study in 2012, utilizing the Rossiter–McLaughlin effect, determined the planetary orbit is strongly misaligned with the equatorial plane of the star, misalignment equal to −107.7±1.6°, making the orbit of WASP-33b retrograde. The periastron node is precessing with a period of 709^{+33}_{−34} years.

== Physical characteristics ==
Limits from radial velocity measurements imply it has less than 4.1 times the mass of Jupiter. The exoplanet orbits so close to its star that its surface temperature is about 3,200 °C (5,790 °F). The transit was later recovered in Hipparcos data.

== Atmosphere ==
In June 2015, NASA reported the exoplanet has a stratosphere, and the atmosphere contains titanium monoxide, which creates the stratosphere. Titanium monoxide is one of only a few compounds that is a strong absorber of visible and ultraviolet radiation, which heats the atmosphere, and is able to exist in a gas state in a hot atmosphere. This was later confirmed using high-resolution spectroscopy technique with the data taken by High Dispersion Spectrograph mounted on the 8.2 m Subaru Telescope. The detection titanium monoxide was not be able to be reproduced with the higher quality data obtained by 2020 although with different setting of observations. Only upper limit of titanium monoxide volume mixing rate equal to 1 ppb can be obtained. Later research reconfirmed the existence of titanium monoxide in the atmosphere of WASP-33b, although in concentrations not detectable by HARPS-N.

The neutral iron and silicon were also detected.

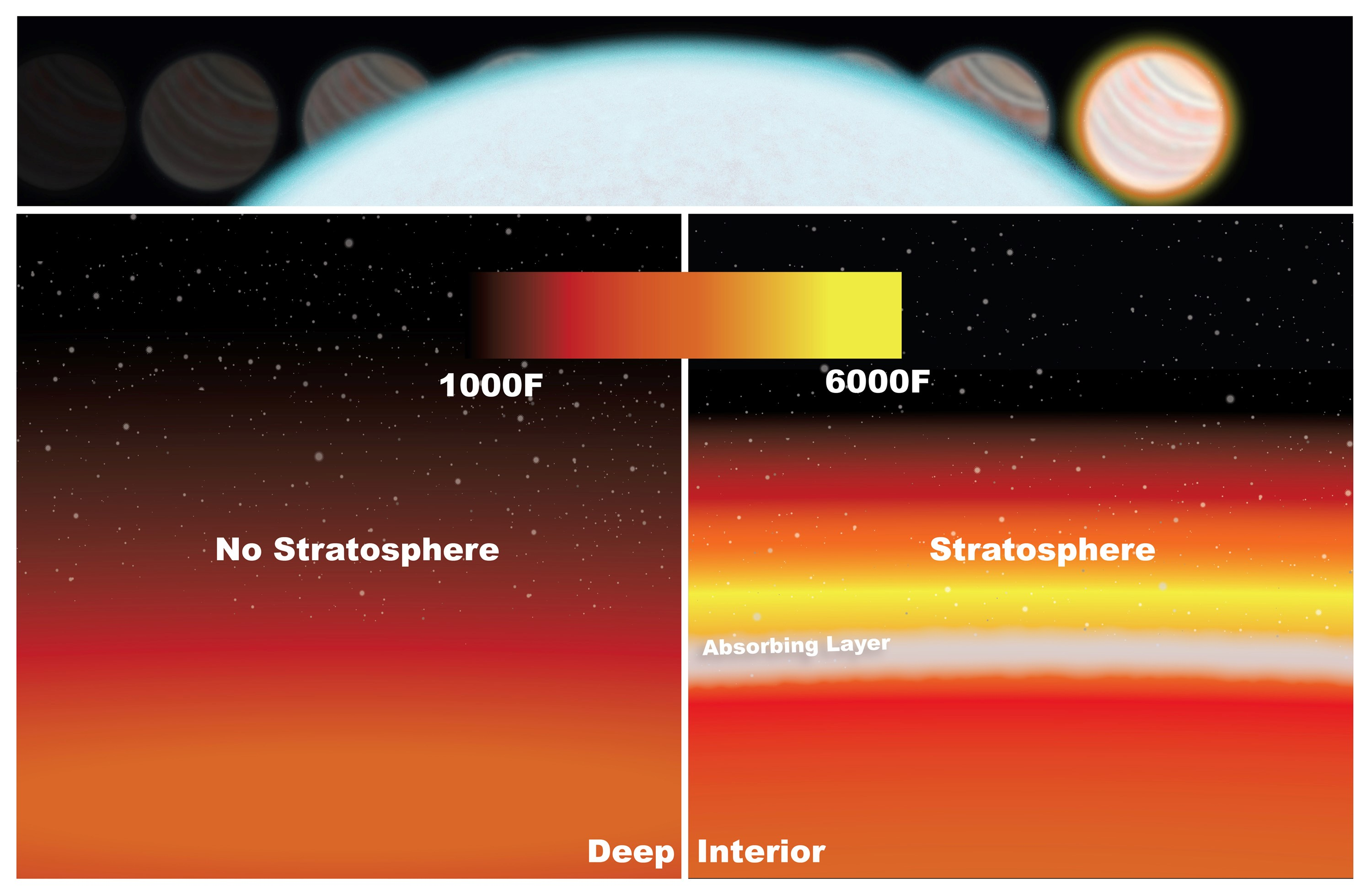
Atmosphere of WASP-33b was detected by monitoring light as the planet passed behind its star (top)—higher temperatures result in the low stratosphere due to molecules absorbing radiation from the star (right)—lower temperatures at higher altitudes would result if there were no stratosphere (left)

In 2020, with the detection of secondary eclipses (when the planet is blocked by its star), the mass of the planet along with temperature profile across its surface was measured. WASP-33b has strong winds in its atmosphere, similar to Venus, shifting the hottest spot 28.7±7.1 degrees to the west. The averaged wind speed is 8.5^{+2.1}_{−1.9} km/s in the thermosphere. The illuminated side brightness temperature is 3,014 ± 60 K (2,740.8 ± 60.0 °C; 4,965.5 ± 108.0 °F), while the nightside brightness temperature is 1,605 ± 45 K (1,331.8 ± 45.0 °C; 2,429.3 ± 81.0 °F).

The atmospheric escape driven by hydrogen Balmer line absorption is relatively modest, totaling about one to ten Earth masses per billion years.

The water in dayside atmosphere of WASP-33b is mostly dissociated to hydroxyl radicals due to high temperature, as planetary emission spectra indicated which was the first detected hydroxyl radicals on a planet outside the Solar System.

== Non-Keplerian features of motion for WASP-33b ==
In view of the high rotational speed of its parent star, the orbital motion of WASP-33b may be affected in a measurable way by the huge oblateness of the star and effects of general relativity.

First, the distorted shape of the star makes its gravitational field deviate from the usual Newtonian inverse-square law. The same is true for the Sun, and part of the precession of the orbit of Mercury is due to this effect. However, it is estimated to be $9 \times 10^9$ greater for WASP-33b.

Other effects will also be greater for WASP-33b. In particular, precession due to general relativistic frame-dragging should be $3 \times 10^5$ greater for WASP-33b than for Mercury, where it is so far too small to have been observed. It has been argued that the oblateness of HD 15082 could be measured at a percent accuracy from a 10-year analysis of the time variations of the planet's transits. Effects due to the planet's oblateness are smaller by at least one order of magnitude, and they depend on the unknown angle between the planet's equator and the orbital plane, perhaps making them undetectable. The effects of frame-dragging are slightly too small to be measured by such an experiment.

Nodal precession of WASP-33b, caused by oblateness of the parent star, was measured by 2021. The gravitational quadrupole moment of the HD 15082 was found to be equal to 6.73±0.22×10^{−5}. The non-Keplerian precession is expected to be 500 times smaller, yet to be detected.

== See also ==
- WASP-121b
