= KELT-1 =

Star in the constellation Andromeda

Observation data Epoch J2000 Equinox ICRS
- Constellation: Andromeda
- Right ascension: 00^{h} 01^{m} 26.9168^{s}
- Declination: +39° 23′ 01.784″
- Apparent magnitude (V): 10.63

Characteristics
- Evolutionary stage: main sequence
- Spectral type: F5

Astrometry
Radial velocity (R_{v})	1.296 km/s
Proper motion (μ)	RA: −9.696 mas/yr Dec.: −7.823 mas/yr
Parallax (π)	3.6836±0.0144 mas
Distance	885 ± 3 ly (271 ± 1 pc)

Position (relative to KELT-1)
Component	KELT-1B
Epoch of observation	2012
Angular distance	0.588±0.001″
Position angle	157.4±0.2°
Projected separation	154±8 AU

Details
Mass	1.369+0.071 −0.075 M_{☉}
Radius	1.501±0.036 R_{☉}
Luminosity	3.56+0.22 −0.21 L_{☉}
Surface gravity (log g)	4.221+0.018 −0.017 cgs
Temperature	6,471+50 −49 K
Metallicity [Fe/H]	+0.095±0.080 dex
Rotational velocity (v sin i)	55 km/s
Age	1.65+0.89 −0.65 Gyr

Other designations
- TOI-1476, TYC 2785-2130-1, GSC 02785-02130, 2MASS J00012691+3923017

Database references
SIMBAD	data

KELT-1 is a F-type main-sequence star. Its surface temperature is 6518±50 K. It is similar to the Sun in its concentration of heavy elements, with a metallicity Fe/H index of 0.008±0.073, but is much younger at an age of 1.75±0.25 billion years. The star is rotating very rapidly.

A red dwarf stellar companion at a projected separation of 154±8 AU was detected in 2012, simultaneously with a planetary companion.

== Planetary system ==
The star was found to be orbited by a low-mass brown dwarf or giant planet in 2012.

The atmosphere of the brown dwarf KELT-1b has been extensively measured from space- and ground-based observatories by a team of astronomers led by Thomas Beatty. They found that KELT-1b has an equilibrium temperature of 2422^{+32}_{−26} K, but features a very strong contrast between measured dayside and nightside temperatures. Dayside temperature appears to be 3340±110 K, while nightside temperature is 1173^{+175}_{−130} K. The excess dayside temperature may be an artifact arising from highly reflective (dayside albedo reaching 0.5, which is unusual for hot planets and brown dwarfs) rock-vapor clouds. Also, the brightest band is shifted eastward from the subsolar point by 18.3±7.4°.

KELT-1b's density of 22.1^{+5.62}_{−9.16} g/cm^{3} is the highest among well characterized planets.

The planetary orbit is well aligned with the equatorial plane of the star, with the misalignment angle equal to 2±16°. Despite the short orbital period, orbital decay of KELT-1b has not been detected as of 2018.

The KELT-1 planetary system
Companion (in order from star)	Mass	Semimajor axis (AU)	Orbital period (days)	Eccentricity	Inclination (°)	Radius
b	27.7+1.0 −1.1 M_{J}	0.02494+0.00042 −0.00046	1.217493996(81)	0.0055+0.0084 −0.0039	85.27+1.10 −0.85	1.138±0.030 R_{J}

== See also ==
- List of exoplanet extremes
