= KELT-20 =

Star in Cygnus

Observation data Epoch J2000.0 Equinox ICRS
- Constellation: Cygnus
- Right ascension: 19^{h} 38^{m} 38.735^{s}
- Declination: +31° 31′ 09.22″
- Apparent magnitude (V): 7.58

Characteristics
- Evolutionary stage: main sequence
- Spectral type: A2V
- Variable type: planetary transit

Astrometry
Proper motion (μ)	RA: 3.251+0.030 −0.008 mas/yr Dec.: −6.01±0.03 mas/yr
Parallax (π)	7.3015±0.0433 mas
Distance	447 ± 3 ly (137.0 ± 0.8 pc)
Absolute magnitude (M_{V})	+2.30

Orbit
Period (P)	12+15 −6 yr
Semi-major axis (a)	6.6+4.8 −2.4 au
Eccentricity (e)	0.43+0.34 −0.30
Inclination (i)	86+57 −52°
Longitude of the node (Ω)	63+160 −46°
Argument of periastron (ω) (secondary)	195±86°

Details

KELT-20
Mass	2.3 M_{☉}
Radius	1.6 R_{☉}
Luminosity	15.7 L_{☉}
Surface gravity (log g)	4.38 cgs
Temperature	9,032 K
Metallicity [Fe/H]	−0.02±0.07 dex
Age	58±5 Myr

Brown dwarf
Mass	34+29 −11 M_{Jup}

Other designations
- HD 185603, HIP 96618, MASCARA-2, KELT-20

Database references
SIMBAD	data

KELT-20, also known as MASCARA-2, is an A2 main sequence star in the constellation of Cygnus, about 447 light years away.

A brown dwarf companion was found in 2026 with the use of radial velocity and astrometry.

== Nomenclature ==
KELT-20 is the star's KELT designation. It is also designated as MASCARA-2 meaning that it is the second star observed by the MASCARA exoplanet search program. Its Henry Draper Catalogue designation is HD 185603, and its Hipparcos designation is HIP 96618.

== Planetary system ==
In 2017, the discovery of the planet KELT-20b was announced.

The KELT-20 planetary system
Companion (in order from star)	Mass	Semimajor axis (AU)	Orbital period (days)	Eccentricity	Inclination (°)	Radius
b	3.382 M_{J}	0.05	3.6127647	—	86.12	1.741 R_{J}
