= KELT-16b =

Highly irradiated ultra-short period hot Jupiter

Discovery
- Discovery date: 2017
- Detection method: Transit

Orbital characteristics
- Semi-major axis: 0.02044 AU
- Eccentricity: 0.0
- Orbital period (sidereal): 0.9689951 d
- Star: TYC 2688-1839-1

Physical characteristics
- Mean diameter: 1.415 M_{J}
- Mass: 2.75 M_{J}
- Mean density: 1.20 g/cm

KELT-16b is an hot Jupiter located 1,450 light years from Earth that has an ultra-short orbital period of 0.96 days that orbits around a F-type main sequence star named TYC 2688-1839-1. It has 2.75 Jupiter masses and a radius of 1.415 Jupiter radii.

KElT-16b is highly irradiated due to its host star. This makes the temperature of KELT-16b around 2453 Kelvin. It is possible that KELT-16b may be driving inward towards its star due to Kozai-livdov oscillations (Kozai mechanism). The atmosphere of KELT-16b is probably more Oxygen-rich then Carbon-rich.
