= KELT-9b =

Hot Jovian exoplanet orbiting KELT-9

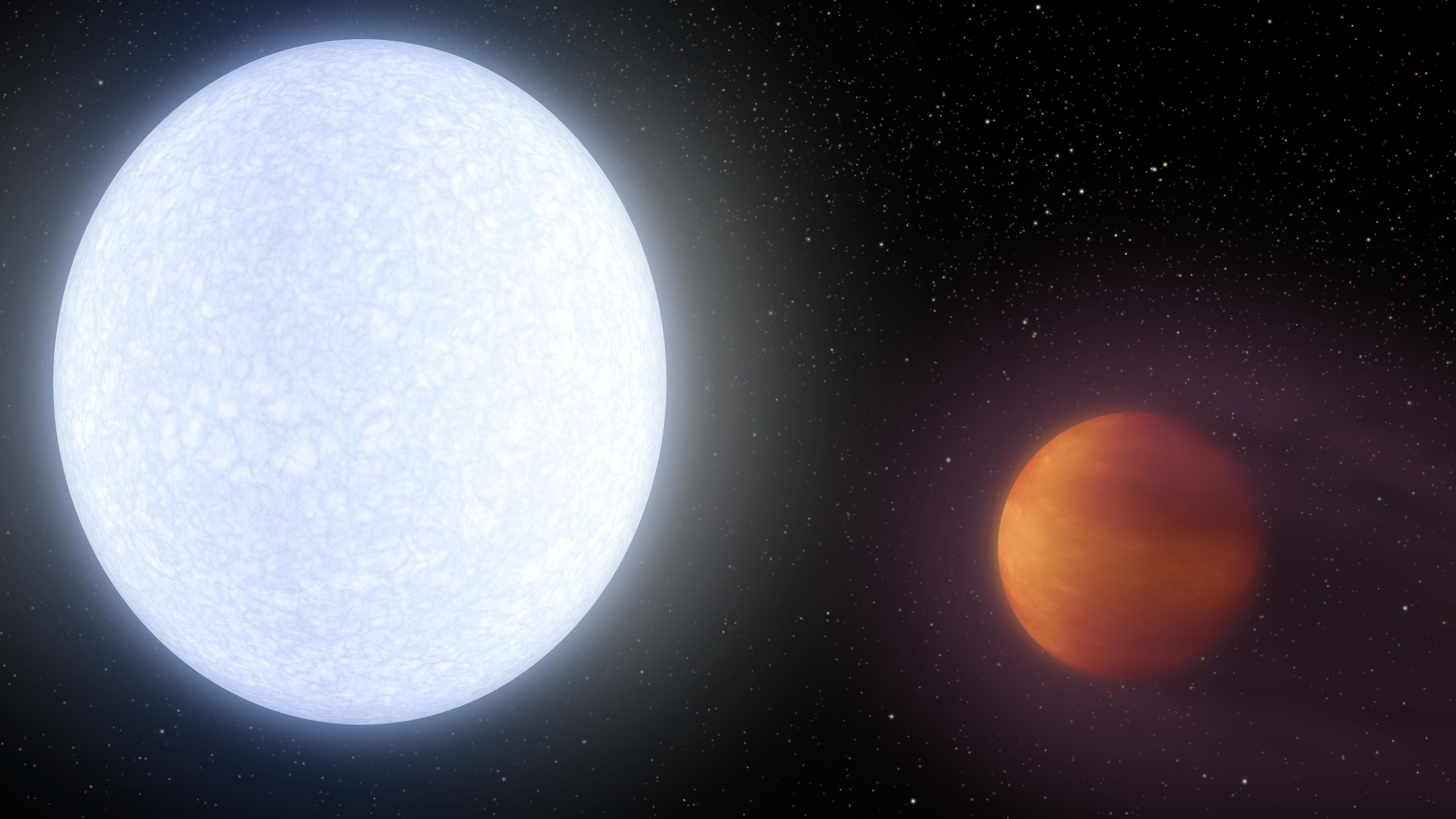
- Artist's impression of KELT-9b and its parent star

Discovery
- Discovered by: B. Scott Gaudi, et al.
- Discovery site: KELT-North, Arizona
- Discovery date: May 2016 (announced); June 2017 (published)
- Detection method: Transit

Designations
- Alternative names: HD 195689 b

Orbital characteristics
- Semi-major axis: 0.03368±0.00078 AU
- Eccentricity: 0
- Orbital period (sidereal): 1.4811235±0.0000011 d
- Inclination: 86.79°±0.25°
- Semi-amplitude: 293±32 m/s
- Star: HD 195689 A

Physical characteristics
- Mean radius: 1.82±0.03 R_{J}
- Mass: 2.22±0.58 M_{J}
- Mean density: 0.491+0.072 −0.066 g/cm^{3}
- Albedo: <0.14
- Temperature: 4,579±120 K (dayside); 2,400+400 −300 K (nightside)

KELT-9b, also designated HD 195689 b, is an exoplanet and ultra-hot Jupiter in a polar orbit around the late B-type/early A-type star KELT-9, located about 670 light-years from Earth. Detected using the Kilodegree Extremely Little Telescope, the discovery of KELT-9b was announced in 2016. As of October 2026, it is the hottest known exoplanet.

== Host star ==
The host star, KELT-9, also designated HD 195689, is 2.3 times larger and 2.4 times more massive than the sun. The surface temperature is 10,170 K (9,897 °C; 17,846 °F), unusually hot for a star with a transiting planet. Prior to the discovery of KELT-9b, only six A-type stars were known to have planets, of which the warmest, WASP-33, is significantly cooler at 7,430 K (7,157 °C; 12,914 °F); no B-type stars were previously known to host planets. KELT-9, classified as B9.5-A0 could be the first B-type star known to have a planet. KELT-9b occupies a circular but strongly inclined orbit a mere 0.03462 AU from KELT-9 with an orbital period of less than 1.5 days.

== Physical properties ==
Exoplanet KELT-9b orbits host star KELT-9

KELT-9b is a relatively large giant planet at about 2.8 times the mass of Jupiter; however given that its radius is nearly twice that of Jupiter, its density is less than half that of it. Like many hot Jupiters, KELT-9b is tidally locked with its host star. The outer boundary of its atmosphere nearly reaches its Roche lobe, implying that the planet is experiencing rapid atmospheric escape driven by the extreme amount of radiation it receives from its host star. In 2020, atmospheric loss rate was measured to be equal to 18 - 68 Earth masses per billion years.

The planet's elemental abundances remain largely unknown as of 2022, but a low carbon-to-oxygen ratio is strongly suspected.

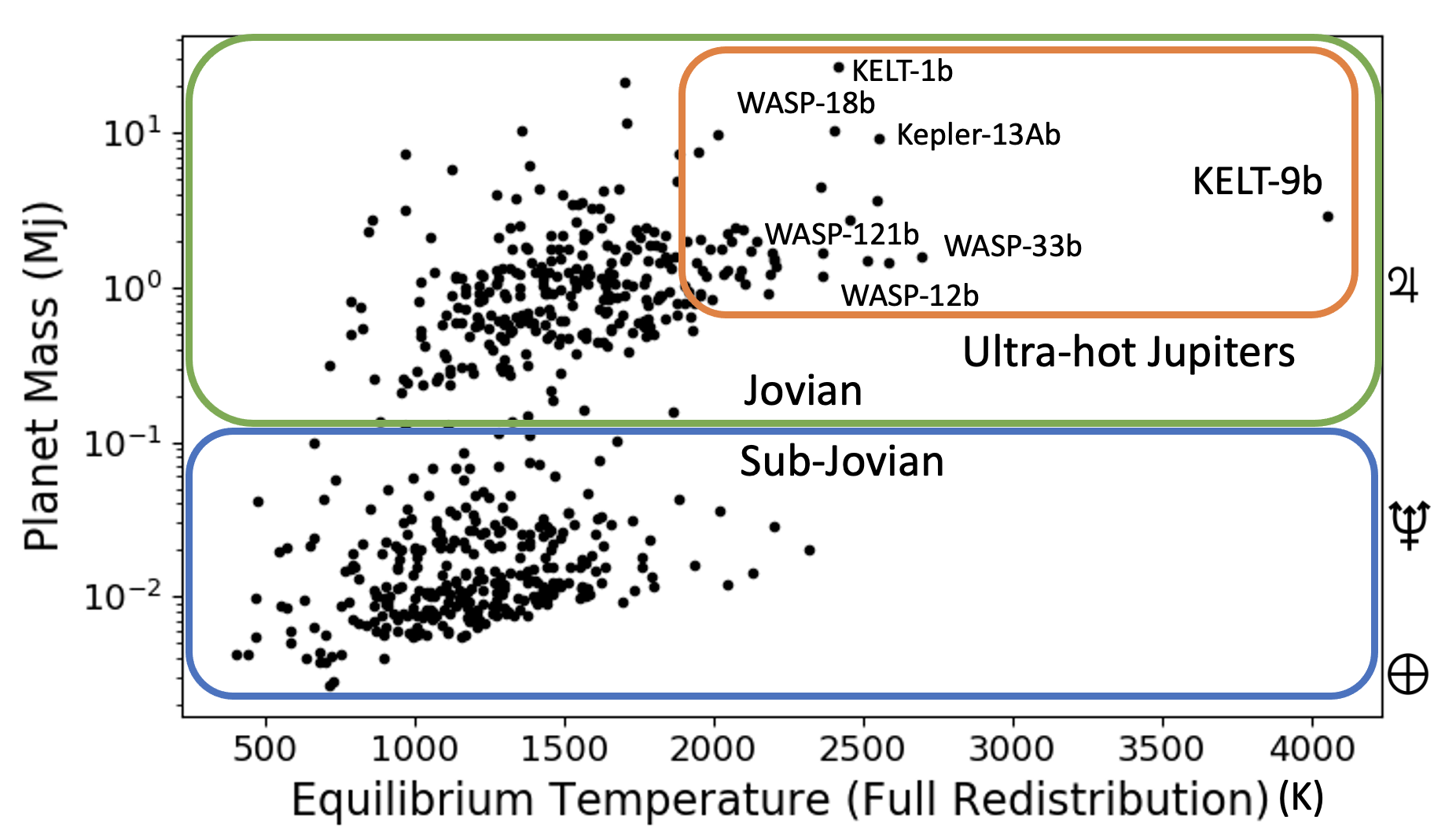
This graph shows the average temperature and mass relative to Jupiter (Mj) of known exoplanets as of 2022

As of November 2026, KELT-9b is the hottest known exoplanet, with dayside temperatures approaching 4,600 K (4,327 °C; 7,820 °F) — warmer than some K-type stars. Molecules on the day side are broken into their component atoms, so that normally sequestered refractory elements can exist as atomic species, including neutral oxygen, neutral and singly ionized atomic iron (Fe and Fe^{+}) and singly ionized titanium (Ti^{+}), only to temporarily reform once they reach the cooler night side, which is indirectly confirmed by measured enhanced heat transfer efficiency of 0.3 between dayside and nightside, likely driven by the latent heat of dissociation and recombination of the molecular hydrogen. Surprisingly, spectra taken in 2021 have unambiguously indicated a presence of metal oxides and hydrides in the planetary atmosphere, although higher resolution spectra taken in 2021 have not found any molecular emissions from the planetary dayside. In 2023, singly-ionized terbium was observed on the planet, making it the first detection of terbium in an exoplanet's atmosphere.

The thermosphere layer of KELT-9b is expected to heat up to 10,000–11,000 K (9,727–10,727 °C; 17,540–19,340 °F), driven by ionization of heavy metals atoms like iron.

In June 2026 scientists found a self-absorption phenomena of Hα in the upper atmosphere KELT-9b. Due to this, it is suspected that the planet is losing 10^{13} grams per second and has a vertical outflow wind speed of ~5 km/s. Another 2026 study potentially detected magnetic field for the planet, via observation of the Zeeman effect with the SPIRou spectrograph.

Size comparison
Jupiter	KELT-9b
Jupiter	Exoplanet

== See also ==
- 51 Pegasi b, the first-discovered Hot Jupiter
- List of hottest exoplanets
