= List of exoplanets discovered in 2015 =

This is a List of exoplanets discovered in 2015.

For exoplanets detected only by radial velocity, the mass value is actually a lower limit. (See Minimum mass for more information)

Name	Mass (M_{J})	Radius (R_{J})	Period (days)	Semi-major axis (AU)	Temp. (K)	Discovery method	Distance (ly)	Host star mass (M_{☉})	Host star temp. (K)	Remarks
2MASS J02192210-3925225 b	13.9^{+1.1}_{−1.9}	1.44		156		imaging	129	0.11	3064	
2MASS J1119-1137	5-10		32872.5	3.6		imaging	86			Pair of rogue planets
Kepler-451b	1.9		406	0.92		timing	1340±20	0.48	29564±106	Two additional planets in the system
51 Eridani b	2			13.2	700	imaging	96±1.0	1.75	7331±30	
8 Ursae Minoris b	1.5		93.4	0.49		radial vel.	519	1.8	4847.4	Proper name Halla
BD+49 828 b	1.6		2590	4.2		radial vel.	1460	1.52	4943	
COROT-28b	0.484	0.955	5.20851	0.0603		transit	1800	1.01	5150	
COROT-29b	0.85	0.9	2.85057	0.0386		transit	2500	0.97	5260	
COROT-33b	59.2	1.1	5.819143	0.0579		transit	2270	0.86	5225	Unusually short period brown dwarf
EPIC 203311200 b		0.51±0.05	540	1.2		transit	1425±163	0.91±0.09	5200±200	Single transit only, true period unknown
Gliese 1132 b	0.0051	0.103	1.62893		580	transit	39.3	0.18	3270	
HAT-P-50b	1.35	1.288	3.1220109	0.0453	1862	transit	1620	1.27	6280	
HAT-P-51b	0.309	1.293	4.2180278	0.05069	1192	transit	1500	0.98	5449	
HAT-P-52b	0.818	1.009	2.7535953	0.03694	1218	transit	1260	0.89	5131	
HAT-P-53b	1.484	1.318	1.9616241	0.03159	1778	transit	2350	1.09	5956	
HAT-P-55b	0.582	1.182	3.5852467	0.04604	1313	transit	1600	1.01	5808	
HAT-P-56b	2.18	1.466	2.7908327	0.0423	1840	transit	1013	1.3	6566	
HAT-P-57b	1.85	1.413	2.465295	0.0406	2200	transit	990	1.47	7500	
HATS-7b	0.120±0.012	0.563^{+0.046}_{−0.034}	3.1853	0.04012±0.00043	1084±32	transit	791±5	0.849±0.027	4985±50	
HATS-8b	0.138	0.873	3.583893	0.04667	1324	transit	2700	1.06	5679	Intensely blue-colored planet
HATS-9b	0.837	1.065	1.9153073	0.03048	1823	transit	2030	1.03	5366	
HATS-10b	0.526	0.969	3.312846	0.04491	1407	transit	1620	1.1	5880	
HATS-13b	0.543	1.212	3.0440499	0.04057	1244	transit	1550	0.96	5523	
HATS-14b	1.071	1.039	2.7667641	0.03815		transit	1670	0.97	5346	
HATS-15b	2.17	1.105	1.74748753	0.02712		transit	2250	0.87	5311	
HATS-16b	3.27	1.3	2.686502	0.03744		transit	2520	0.97	5738	
HATS-17b	1.338	0.777	16.254611	0.1308	814	transit	1110	1.13	5846	
HD 1605 b	0.96		577.9	1.48		radial vel.	276	1.31	4757	Subgiant host star
HD 1605 c	3.48		2111	3.52		radial vel.	276	1.31	4757	Subgiant host star
HD 1666 b	6.43		270	0.94		radial vel.	360.8	1.5	6317	
HD 7924 c	0.02473		15.299	0.1134	584	radial vel.	54.9	0.83	5075	
HD 7924 d	0.02026		24.451	0.1551	499	radial vel.	54.9	0.83	5075	
HD 11755 b	6.5		433.7	1.08		radial vel.	755	0.9	4312.5	
HD 12648 b	2.9		133.6	0.54		radial vel.	517	1.2	4835.8	
HD 24064 b	9.4		535.6	1.29		radial vel.	862	1	4052.5	
HD 32963 b	0.7		2372	3.41		radial vel.	114.9	0.94	5727	
HD 33844 b	1.96		551.4	1.6		radial vel.	329	1.78	4861	
HD 33844 c	1.75		916	2.24		radial vel.	329	1.78	4861	
HD 95127 b	5.01		482	1.28		radial vel.	1080	1.2	4218	
HD 95872 b	4.6		4375	5.2		radial vel.	236	0.95	5312	
HD 145934 b	2.28		2730	4.6		radial vel.	748	1.75		
HD 164595 b	0.05078		40	0.23		radial vel.	94.4	0.99	5790	
HD 175607 b	0.0260±0.0039		29.03±0.03			radial vel.	147.7	0.71	5392	Metal-poor host star, additional planet suspected
HD 216536 b	1.47		148.6	0.609		radial vel.	1240	1.36	4639	
HD 219134 b	0.01491	0.143	3.092926	0.03876		radial vel.	21.4	0.81	4699	
HD 219134 c	0.01372	0.135	6.76458	0.0653		radial vel.	21.4	0.81	4699	
HD 219134 d	0.05088	0.144	46.859	0.237		radial vel.	21.4	0.81	4699	
HD 219134 f	0.02297	0.117	22.717	0.1463		radial vel.	21.4	0.81	4699	
HD 219134 g	0.034		94.2	0.3753		radial vel.	21.4	0.81	4699	
HD 219134 h	0.308±0.014		2100.6±2.9	3.11		radial vel.	21.4	0.81	4699	
HIP 65891 b	6		1084.5	2.81		radial vel.	492	2.5	5000	Host star also known as HD 117253
HIP 107773 b	1.98		144.3	0.72		radial vel.	344	2.42	4945	Host star also known as HD 207229
K2-3b		0.194	10.05449	0.0769	463	transit	143.9	0.6	3896	
K2-3c		0.165	24.64354	0.1399	344	transit	143.9	0.6	3896	
K2-3d		0.135	44.55983	0.2076	282	transit	143.9	0.6	3896	
K2-4b		0.211	10.00329	0.0777		transit	761	0.63	4197	
K2-5b		0.17	5.73594	0.0532		transit	666	0.61	3930	
K2-5c		0.202	10.93241	0.0818		transit	666	0.61	3930	
K2-6b		0.223	30.94191	0.1898		transit	1040	0.97	5850	
K2-7b		0.238	28.67992	0.1814		transit	2460	0.97	5772	
K2-8b		0.319	10.35239	0.0856		transit	1330	0.78	4870	Unconfirmed in 2016
K2-9b		0.201	18.4498	0.091		transit	360	0.3	3390	
K2-10b	0.08495	0.343	19.3044			transit	880	0.92	5620	
K2-11b		0.674	39.93767	0.2257		transit	6590	1.35	5433	
K2-12b		0.208	8.28212	0.0802		transit	960	1.01	5800	
K2-13b		0.169	39.91488	0.2114		transit	950	0.8	5698	
K2-14b		0.429	8.36802	0.0627		transit	710	0.47	3789	
K2-15b		0.221	11.8104	0.091		transit	1430	0.72	5131	
K2-16b		0.18	7.6188	0.0667	658	transit	1060	0.68	4742	
K2-16c		0.227	19.07863	0.1229	485	transit	1060	0.68	4742	
K2-17b		0.199	17.96753	0.119		transit	440	0.71	4320	
K2-18b		0.2	32.94488	0.1491		transit	124.2	0.41	3503	
K2-19b	0.090	0.691	7.9194	0.074	854	transit	950	0.93	5430	
K2-19c	0.081	0.434	11.90715	0.0971	745	transit	950	0.93	5430	
K2-21b		0.142	9.32414	0.0731		transit	210	0.64	4043	
K2-21c		0.171	15.5012	0.1026		transit	210	0.64	4043	
K2-22b	1.4	0.223	0.381078	0.0088		transit	730	0.6	3830	
K2-25b		0.306	3.484552			transit	149	0.29	3180	Parent star, also known as EPIC 210490365, belongs to Hyades
K2-28b		0.207	2.260455	0.0214		transit	170	0.26	3214	
KELT-4Ab	0.902	1.699	2.9895932	0.04317	1827	transit	680	1.2	6206	
KELT-6c	3.71		1276	2.39		radial vel.	720	1.13	6272	
KELT-7b	1.28±0.17	1.496±0.035	2.7347749	0.0434±0.0012	2028±17	transit	442±2	1.517±0.022	6699±24	
KELT-8b	0.867	1.86	3.24406	0.04571	1675	transit	770	1.21	5754	
KELT-10b	0.679	1.399	4.1662739	0.0525	1377	transit	600	1.11	5948	
KELT-14b	1.284	1.743	1.7100566	0.03005		transit	870	1.24	5720	Host star also known as WASP-122
KELT-15b	0.91	1.443	3.329441	0.04613		transit	950	1.18	6003	
Kepler-455b		0.616	1322.3			transit	4100	0.98	6175	Host star also known as KIC 3558849
Kepler-460b		0.571	440.7813			transit	4330	1.07	6340	Host star also known as KIC 5437945
Kepler-456b		0.589	1320.1			transit	2480	0.98	6258	Host star also known as KIC 5951458
Kepler-458b		0.41	572.3847			transit	5500	0.98	6065	Host star also known as KIC 9663113
Kepler-459b		0.491	854.083			transit	5000	1.01	6091	Host star also known as KIC 10525077
Kepler-457b		0.366	31.8099			transit	3610	1.04	6474	Host star also known as KIC 8540376
Kepler-457c		0.214	75.2			transit	3610	1.04	6474	Host star also known as KIC 8540376
KOI-12b	10	1.43	17.8552333	0.151		transit	1390	1.45	6820	Host star also known as Kepler-448
KOI-4427.01		0.208	147.6606	0.42		transit	783	0.526	3813	Potentially habitable exoplanet, false positive probability 0.8%. Also a red dwarf in the system.
Kepler-92d		0.184	49.3568			transit	1580±17	1.21	5883	
Kepler-433b	2.82	1.45	5.33408384	0.0679		transit	6100	1.46	6360	Host star also known as KOI-206
Kepler-434b	2.86	1.13	12.8747099	0.1143		transit	4000	1.2	5977	Host star also known as KOI-614
Kepler-435b	0.84	1.99	8.6001536	0.0948		transit	6800	1.54	6161	Host star also known as KOI-680
Kepler-436b		0.24	64.00205	0.339		transit	2020	0.73	4651	Host star also known as KOI-2529
Kepler-437b		0.19	66.65062	0.288		transit	1360	0.71	4551	Host star also known as KOI-3255
Kepler-438b		0.1	35.23319	0.166		transit	470	0.54	3748	Host star also known as KOI-3284
Kepler-439b		0.2	178.1396	0.563		transit	2260	0.88	5431	Host star also known as KOI-4005
Kepler-440b		0.17	101.11141	0.242		transit	850	0.57	4134	Host star also known as KOI-4087
Kepler-441b		0.15	207.2482	0.64		transit	930	0.57	4340	Host star also known as KOI-4622
Kepler-442b		0.12	112.3053	0.409		transit	1120	0.61	4402	Potentially habitable exoplanet, host star also known as KOI-4742
Kepler-443b		0.21	177.6693	0.495		transit	2540	0.74	4723	Host star also known as KOI-4745
Kepler-444b		0.036	3.6001053	0.04178		transit	116	0.76	5046	
Kepler-444c		0.044	4.5458841	0.04881		transit	116	0.76	5046	
Kepler-444d		0.047	6.189392	0.06		transit	116	0.76	5046	
Kepler-444e		0.049	7.743493	0.0696		transit	116	0.76	5046	
Kepler-444f		0.066	9.740486	0.0811		transit	116	0.76	5046	
Kepler-445b		0.14	2.984151			transit	290	0.18	3157	
Kepler-445c		0.22	4.871229			transit	290	0.18	3157	
Kepler-445d		0.11	8.15275			transit	290	0.18	3157	
Kepler-446b		0.13	1.565409			transit	390	0.22	3359	
Kepler-446c		0.1	3.036179			transit	390	0.22	3359	
Kepler-446d		0.12	5.148921			transit	390	0.22	3359	
Kepler-447b	1.37	1.65	7.79430132	0.0769		transit	881±6	1	5493	
Kepler-449b		0.183	12.58242			transit	848	0.97		Stellar companion in system
Kepler-449c		0.247	33.6727			transit	848	0.97		Stellar companion in system
Kepler-450b		0.548	28.454851			transit	1506±17	1.35		
Kepler-450c		0.234	15.413135			transit	1506±17	1.35		
Kepler-450d		0.075	7.51464			transit	1506±17	1.35		
Kepler-454b	0.02152	0.211	10.57375339	0.0954		transit	758±4	1.03	5701	
Kepler-454c	4.46		523.9			radial vel.	758±4	1.03	5701	
MOA-2010-BLG-353Lb	0.27			1.72		microlensing	21000	0.18		
MOA-2011-BLG-028Lb	0.09439			4.14		microlensing	24100	0.75		
MOA-2013-BLG-605Lb	0.01007			0.94		microlensing		0.03		
OGLE-2012-BLG-0563Lb	0.39			0.9		microlensing	4200	0.34		
OGLE-2015-BLG-0966Lb	0.06607			2.1		microlensing	8200	0.38		
Psi1 Draconis Bb	1.53		3117	4.43		radial vel.	72.3	1.19	6212	
VHS 1256-1257 b	11.8±0.2		6,200,000^{+2,900,000}_{−4,000,000}	360^{+110}_{−150}		imaging	69.0±0.7	0.089^{+0.010}_{−0.010}	2620±140	
WASP-41c	3.18		421	1.07	241	radial vel.	590	0.93	5545	
WASP-47c	1.57		580.7	1.41	247	radial vel.	650	1.11	5576	
WASP-47d	0.05286	0.331	9.095	0.088		transit	650	1.11	5576	
WASP-47e	0.02863	0.162	0.789636	0.0173		transit	650	1.11	5576	
WASP-120b	4.85	1.473	3.6112706	0.0514	1890	transit	1430	1.39	6450	
WASP-121b	1.183^{+0.064}_{−0.062}	1.865±0.044	1.2749255^{+0.00000020}_{−0.00000025}	0.02544^{+0.00049}_{−0.00050}	2358±52	timing	858±2	1.353^{+0.080}_{−0.079}	6459±140	
WASP-123b	0.899	1.318	2.9776412	0.04263	1510	transit	700	1.17	5740	
WASP-135b	1.90±0.08	1.30±0.09	1.4013794±0.0000008	0.0243±0.0005		transit	980±150	0.98±0.06	5675±60	
Wolf 1061b	0.00601		4.8869	0.0375		radial vel.	14.04±0.03	0.29	3342	
Wolf 1061c	0.01073		17.8719	0.089		radial vel.	14.04±0.03	0.29	3342	Potentially habitable exoplanet
Wolf 1061d	0.02423		217.21	0.47		radial vel.	14.04±0.03	0.29	3342	

== Specific exoplanet lists ==
Lists of exoplanets

- List of directly imaged exoplanets
- List of exoplanet extremes
- List of exoplanet firsts
- List of exoplanets discovered by the Kepler space telescope
- List of exoplanets observed during Kepler's K2 mission
- List of exoplanets discovered by the TESS mission
- List of extrasolar candidates for liquid water
- List of terrestrial exoplanet candidates for atmosphere detection
- List of hottest exoplanets
- List of coldest exoplanets
- List of multiplanetary systems
- List of circumbinary planets
- List of nearest exoplanets
- List of nearest terrestrial exoplanet candidates
- List of potentially habitable exoplanets
- List of proper names of exoplanets
- List of largest exoplanets
- List of smallest exoplanets
- List of transiting exoplanets
- List of exoplanets and planetary debris around giant stars
- List of exoplanets and planetary debris around white dwarfs
- List of extrasolar planetary collisions

=== Lists of exoplanets by year of discovery ===
- List of exoplanets discovered before 2000 (31)
- List of exoplanets discovered between 2000–2009 (375)
- List of exoplanets discovered in 2010 (109)
- List of exoplanets discovered in 2011 (179)
- List of exoplanets discovered in 2012 (149)
- List of exoplanets discovered in 2013 (149)
- List of exoplanets discovered in 2014 (869)
- List of exoplanets discovered in 2015 (144)
- List of exoplanets discovered in 2016 (1498)
- List of exoplanets discovered in 2017 (152)
- List of exoplanets discovered in 2018 (300)
- List of exoplanets discovered in 2019 (169)
- List of exoplanets discovered in 2020 (256)
- List of exoplanets discovered in 2021 (253)
- List of exoplanets discovered in 2022 (312)
- List of exoplanets discovered in 2023 (304)
- List of exoplanets discovered in 2024 (284)
- List of exoplanets discovered in 2025 (138)
- List of exoplanets discovered in 2026 (158)
