= Delta Draconis =

Star in the constellation Draco

- Location of δ Draconis (circled)

Observation data Epoch J2000 Equinox ICRS
- Constellation: Draco
- Right ascension: 19^{h} 12^{m} 33.30137^{s}
- Declination: +67° 39′ 41.5392″
- Apparent magnitude (V): 3.07

Characteristics
- Spectral type: G9 III
- U−B color index: +0.78
- B−V color index: +1.00

Astrometry
Radial velocity (R_{v})	24.71±0.16 km/s
Proper motion (μ)	RA: +94.599 mas/yr Dec.: +92.374 mas/yr
Parallax (π)	33.3499±0.1567 mas
Distance	97.8 ± 0.5 ly (30.0 ± 0.1 pc)
Absolute magnitude (M_{V})	+0.62

Details
Mass	1.70±0.18 M_{☉}
Radius	10.62±0.07 R_{☉}
Luminosity	59 L_{☉}
Surface gravity (log g)	2.59±0.05 cgs
Temperature	4,831±13 K
Metallicity [Fe/H]	−0.13±0.05 dex
Rotational velocity (v sin i)	8 km/s
Age	1.66±0.35 Gyr

Other designations
- Aldib, Altais, Nodus Secundus, δ Dra, 57 Draconis, BD+67 1129, FK5 723, HD 180711, HIP 94376, HR 7310, SAO 18222

Database references
SIMBAD	data

Delta Draconis is a yellow star in the constellation of Draco. It has the proper name Altais, pronounced /ælˈteɪ.ɪs/. This star has an apparent visual magnitude of 3.0, making it easily visible to the naked eye. Based on parallax measurements obtained by the Gaia mission, it is located at a distance of approximately 97.8 light-years (30.0 parsecs) from the Sun.

== Nomenclature ==
δ Draconis (Latinised to Delta Draconis) is the star's Bayer designation, which is abbreviated Delta Dra or δ Dra.

It bore the traditional names Aldib, Altais (the goat) and Nodus Secundus. The title Altais was derived from Arabic Al Tāis "the Goat", the association of this star, along with Pi Draconis, Rho Draconis and Epsilon Draconis (Tyl). According to a 1971 NASA catalog of stars, Al Tāis or Tais were the title for three stars : Delta Draconis as Altais, Pi Draconis as Tais I and Rho Draconis as Tais II (exclude Epsilon Draconis). In 2016, the International Astronomical Union organized a Working Group on Star Names (WGSN) to catalogue and standardize proper names for stars. The WGSN approved the name Altais for this star on 21 August 2016 and it is now so included in the List of IAU-approved Star Names.

In Chinese, 天廚 (Tiān Chú, Tien Choo), meaning Celestial Kitchen or Heaven's Kitchen, refers to an asterism consisting of Delta Draconis, Sigma Draconis, Epsilon Draconis, Rho Draconis, 64 Draconis and Pi Draconis. Consequently, the Chinese name for Delta Draconis itself is 天廚一 (Tiān Chú yī, English: the First Star of Celestial Kitchen).

== Properties ==
Delta Draconis is a giant star with a stellar classification of G9 III. This indicates that it has exhausted the supply of hydrogen at its core and entered a later stage in its evolution. Around 1.7 billion years old, Delta Draconis has expanded to 10.5 times the Sun's radius and is radiating 59 times the luminosity of the Sun from its outer atmosphere at an effective temperature of 4,873 K. At this temperature, it is giving off the yellow-hued glow of a G-type star. With a mass 1.7 times that of the Sun, this star will end its life as a white dwarf.

Delta Draconis is the northern pole star of Ceres, lying 1.5 degrees from the true pole.
