= HD 219134 d =

Exoplanet orbiting the star HD 219134

Discovery
- Discovery site: HARPS-N of the Telescopio Nazionale Galileo
- Discovery date: 2015 July 30
- Detection method: radial velocity method (HARPS-N);

Orbital characteristics
- Apastron: 0.2697 (± 0.0059) AU
- Periastron: 0.2043 (± 0.0059) AU
- Semi-major axis: 0.2370 (± 0.003) AU
- Eccentricity: 0.138 (± 0.025)
- Orbital period (sidereal): 46.8590 (± 0.028) d
- Inclination: null
- Star: HD 219134

Physical characteristics
- Mean radius: >1.61 (± 0.02) R_{🜨}
- Mass: >16.17 (± 0.64) M_{🜨}
- Mean density: <21.4 g cm^{−3}
- Surface gravity: <6.24 g
- Temperature: 410.5 K (137.4 °C; 279.2 °F)

HD 219134 d, also known as HR 8832 d, is an exoplanet orbiting around the K-type star HD 219134 in the constellation of Cassiopeia. It has a minimum mass over 16 times that of Earth, indicating that it is likely a Hot Neptune. The exoplanet was initially detected by the instrument HARPS-N of the Italian Telescopio Nazionale Galileo via the radial velocity method. Unlike HD 219134 b and HD 219134 c it was not observed by the Spitzer Space Telescope and thus its radius and density are unknown. Only a minimum possible mass can be given.

== Characteristics ==
=== Mass, radius, and temperature ===
HD 219134 d is a likely ice giant, with a minimum mass of 16.17 M_{🜨}, comparable to that of Neptune. However, because it has not been found to transit its host star, the planet's true mass and radius are unknown. Gillion et al predicts a minimum possible radius of 1.61 R_{🜨}, equivalent with a pure iron composition. However, such a composition is highly unlikely for a planet of this mass. For a composition similar to that of Neptune, HD 219134 d would be about 4.0 R_{🜨}. While a transit of the planet has not been detected yet, there is an estimated 8.5% that one would occur, and a mission like the Transiting Exoplanet Survey Satellite may be able to detect one.

The planet's equilibrium temperature is calculated to be 410.5 K (137.4 °C; 279.2 °F), similar to that of Mercury. It receives about 4.7 times the stellar insolation of Earth.

=== Orbit ===
HD 219134 d is the fourth planet out from its star. It takes about 46.9 days to complete one orbit at a distance of 0.237 AU. For comparison, Mercury orbits every 88 days at 0.38 AU. The planet has a relatively eccentric orbit with an eccentricity of 0.138. It may be tidally locked.

=== Host star ===
The planet HD 219134 d orbits the K3V orange dwarf HD 219134, also known as HR 8832. It is 79% the radius and 80% the mass of the Sun with 28% the luminosity. It has a temperature of 4699 K and is around 12.5 billion years old or less. For comparison, the Sun has a temperature of 5778 K and is 4.55 billion years old.

The apparent magnitude of the star, or how bright it appears from Earth, is around 5. Therefore, it is just visible to the unaided eye.
