= HD 219134 g =

Unconfirmed exoplanet orbiting HD 219134

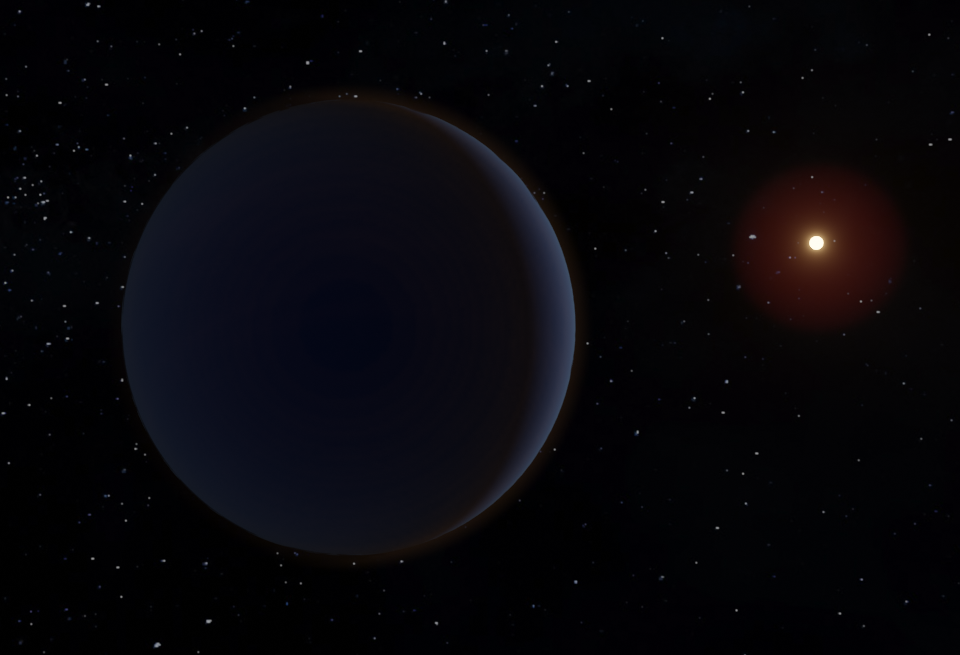

Discovery
- Discovered by: HARPS-N
- Discovery site: La Palma, Canary Islands
- Discovery date: 2015 November 17
- Detection method: radial velocity method

Orbital characteristics
- Semi-major axis: 0.3753±0.0004 AU, 0.603±0.001 AU
- Eccentricity: 0, 0.16±0.1
- Orbital period (sidereal): 94.2±0.2 d, 192.0+0.5 −0.4 d
- Argument of periastron: 0°, −0.4±0.6 rad
- Semi-amplitude: 1.8±0.2 m/s, 2.0±0.2 m/s
- Star: HD 219134

Physical characteristics
- Mass: ≥10.8±1.3 M_{🜨}, ≥15.3±1.6 M_{🜨}
- Temperature: 298 K (25 °C; 77 °F)

HD 219134 g, also known as HR 8832 g, is an unconfirmed exoplanet orbiting around the K-type star HD 219134 in the constellation of Cassiopeia. It has a minimum mass of 11 or 15 Earth masses, suggesting that it is likely a Neptune-like ice giant. Unlike HD 219134 b and HD 219134 c it is not observed to transit and thus its radius and density are unknown. If it has an Earth-like composition, it would have a radius 1.9 times that of Earth. However, since it is probably a Neptune-like planet, it is likely larger.

== Characteristics ==
=== Mass, radius, and temperature ===
HD 219134 g is a sub-Neptune-mass exoplanet with a minimum mass of 10.8 M_{🜨} and an unknown radius, as it is not known to transit. However, due to the high metal content of the host star, the planet might not be an ice giant. For a rock-iron composition, HD 219134 g would be about 1.9 R_{🜨}, which seems unlikely for a planet of this mass. A more plausible rock-water composition would put the planet at about 2.4 R_{🜨}. Assuming an albedo of 0.3, it has an equilibrium temperature of 298 K (25 °C; 77 °F), but with an atmosphere it is likely to have a surface temperature much higher, that is if it has a rocky surface. So, it is rather unlikely to be habitable.

=== Orbit ===
HD 219134 g was initially estimated to take about 94.2 days to orbits its star at a distance of 0.3753 AU. This is comparable to Mercury's orbit of 88 days at about 0.38 AU. However, due to the lower luminosity of the host star, HD 219134 g is closer to Venus' situation. The eccentricity of the planet's orbit is believed to be close to zero, indicating a very circular orbit.

However, a 2020 study did not find evidence of a radial velocity signal at this period, but instead found a period of 192 days, corresponding to an orbital distance of 0.603 AU.

=== Host star ===
The planet HD 219134 g orbits the K3V orange dwarf HD 219134, also known as HR 8832. It is 79% the radius and 80% the mass of the Sun with 26% the luminosity. It has a temperature of 4699 K and is around 11 billion years old. For comparison, the Sun has a temperature of 5778 K and is 4.55 billion years old.

The apparent magnitude of the star, or how bright it appears from Earth, is around 5. Therefore, it is just visible to the unaided eye to most observers.

== Habitability ==
The habitable zone for this star, as defined by Kopparapu et al. 2014, for a 5 Earth mass planet, would be between 0.499 AU and 0.947 AU. (Note: $\scriptstyle S_{eff_{\ast}}= S_{eff_{\odot}} + aT_{\ast} + bT_{\ast}^2 + cT_{\ast}^3 + dT_{\ast}^4$ when used to calculate the stellar flux reaching the outer atmosphere of a 5 mass Earth-like planet orbiting HD 219134 at the Inner Habitable Zone edge - the Runaway Greenhouse limit gives a $\scriptstyle S_{eff_{\ast}}$ of 1.0615 or 106.15% the stellar flux reaching the top of Earth's atmosphere. By applying the previously calculated stellar flux and the known 26.46% luminosity of HD 219134 into the equation, $\scriptstyle {d = {\left(\frac{{L_{\ast}}/{L_{\odot}}}{S_{eff_{\ast}}} \right)^{0.5} AU}}$, the distance of the Inner HZ - Runaway Greenhouse limit from HD 219134 can be calculated as $\scriptstyle{0.499 AU}$.) HD 219134 g may orbit slightly interior to the inner edge of the habitable zone based on its initially published parameters, or may orbit within the habitable zone based on a more recent estimated orbital period of 192 days and semi-major axis of 0.603 AU. This planet is significantly more massive than Earth and therefore it likely retains a dense atmosphere, comparable to the Solar System's ice giants.
