= Epsilon Draconis =

Binary star in the constellation Draco

- Location of ε Draconis (circled)

Observation data Epoch J2000 Equinox ICRS
- Constellation: Draco
- A
- Right ascension: 19^{h} 48^{m} 10.35046^{s}
- Declination: +70° 16′ 04.5491″
- Apparent magnitude (V): 3.91
- B
- Right ascension: 19^{h} 48^{m} 10.54875^{s}
- Declination: +70° 16′ 07.5676″
- Apparent magnitude (V): 6.80

Characteristics

A
- Evolutionary stage: red clump
- Spectral type: G7IIIbFe-1
- U−B color index: +0.48
- B−V color index: +0.88

B
- Spectral type: F6V
- B−V color index: 0.57

Astrometry

A
Radial velocity (R_{v})	+2.89±0.11 km/s
Proper motion (μ)	RA: +79.486 mas/yr Dec.: +40.041 mas/yr
Parallax (π)	21.3219±0.1256 mas
Distance	153.0 ± 0.9 ly (46.9 ± 0.3 pc)

B
Proper motion (μ)	RA: +86.898 mas/yr Dec.: +37.126 mas/yr
Parallax (π)	21.3808±0.0403 mas
Distance	152.5 ± 0.3 ly (46.77 ± 0.09 pc)

Details

A
Mass	1.20±0.08, 1.76+0.29 −0.23 M_{☉}
Radius	10.41±0.29 R_{☉}
Luminosity	63.1 L_{☉}
Surface gravity (log g)	2.61 cgs
Temperature	4,966±41 K
Metallicity	$\begin{smallmatrix}\left[\ce{M}/\ce{H}\right]\end{smallmatrix}$ = -0.31
Metallicity [Fe/H]	−0.30 dex
Rotational velocity (v sin i)	2.25±0.56 km/s
Age	2.6+1.8 −1.6 Gyr

B
Radius	1.16 R_{☉}
Luminosity	2.814 L_{☉}
Temperature	6,936 K

Other designations
- Tyl, ε Dra, 63 Dra, AG+70°689, BD+69°1070, GC 27471, HD 188119, HIP 97433, HR 7582, SAO 9540, CCDM J19482+7016AB, PLX 4689, IRAS 19483+7008, 2MASS J19481035+7016045

Database references
SIMBAD	data

Epsilon Draconis is a wide binary star system in the northern constellation of Draco. Its name is a Bayer designation that is Latinized from ε Draconis and abbreviated Epsilon Dra or ε Dra. With a combined apparent magnitude of 3.84, it is visible to the naked eye and is the eleventh-brightest star in this rather faint constellation. This star along with Delta Draconis (Altais), Pi Draconis and Rho Draconis forms an asterism known as Al Tāis, meaning "the Goat". The distance to this system has been calculated to be about 150 light-years, based on stellar parallax measurements.

In Chinese astronomy, 天廚 (Tiān Chú), meaning the Celestial Kitchen, refers to an asterism consisting of Epsilon Draconis, Delta Draconis, Sigma Draconis, Rho Draconis, 64 Draconis and Pi Draconis. Consequently, the Chinese name for Epsilon Draconis itself is 天廚三 (Tiān Chú sān, English: the Third Star of the Celestial Kitchen.) Most authors do not use a traditional name for this star, using instead the Bayer designation; but Bečvář (1951) listed it as Tyl /ˈtɪl/.

== Visibility ==
With a declination in excess of 70 degrees north, Epsilon Draconis is principally visible in the northern hemisphere, with southern locations north of 20° South able to see it just above the horizon. The star is circumpolar throughout all of Europe, China, most of India and as far south as the tip of the Baja peninsula in North America as well as other locations around the globe having a latitude greater than about 20° North. Since Epsilon Draconis has an apparent magnitude of almost 4.0, the star is easily observable to the naked eye as long as one's stargazing is not hampered by the light pollution common to most cities.

The best time for observation is in the evening sky during the summer months, when the "Dragon constellation" passes the meridian at midnight, but given its circumpolar nature in the northern hemisphere, it is visible to most of the world's inhabitants throughout the year.

== Properties ==
Epsilon Draconis is a binary star system whose components can be split in a telescope. They are separated by 3.2 arcseconds as of 2012, translating to a projected separation of 145 astronomical units.

The primary of the system has a spectral type of G7IIIbFe-1, which classify it as a is a yellow giant star, a star which ran out of hydrogen at its core and expanded in size. It is visible with apparent magnitude of 3.91. Asteroseismology of this star retrieve a mass of 1.20 solar masses and a radius over ten times solar. Other estimates suggest masses between 1.5 and 2 solar masses. This star's abundance of elements heavier than helium relative to hydrogen, what astronomers term metallicity, is just half of the Sun's. (Note: The abundance is estimated by taking [M/H] to the power of ten: 10^{[M/H]} = 10^{−0.31} = 0.49) The effective temperature of the star is 4,966 K, roughly 800 degrees cooler than the Sun. It seems to have already enabled helium fusion at its core, being a red clump star.

The secondary is a F-type main-sequence star of class F6V, fusing hydrogen into helium at its core. It has an apparent magnitude 6.8 and is 14 times fainter than the primary. This star is about 20% times larger, three times brighter and about 1,100 degrees hotter than the Sun.
