= HD 219134 h =

Gas giant orbiting HD 219134

Discovery
- Discovery date: 2015 November 17
- Detection method: radial velocity method

Designations
- Alternative names: HD 219134 e, HR 8832 h, HR 8832 e

Orbital characteristics
- Semi-major axis: 2.968±0.037 AU
- Eccentricity: 0.025+0.027 −0.018
- Orbital period (sidereal): 2100.6±2.9 d
- Time of periastron: 2456761±20 JD
- Argument of periastron: 0.0°±63.0°
- Semi-amplitude: 5.73+0.22 −0.23 m/s
- Star: HD 219134

Physical characteristics
- Mass: ≥97.9±4.4 M_{🜨}

HD 219134 h, also known as HR 8832 h, is an exoplanet orbiting around the K-type star HD 219134 in the constellation of Cassiopeia. It has a minimum mass of 108 Earth masses, which indicates that the planet is likely a gas giant. Unlike HD 219134 b and c it is not observed to transit and thus its radius and density are unknown.

This planet was initially reported in two 2015 papers; one referred to it as HD 219134 e, while the other found different, and more accurate, parameters for it and so treated it as a different planet, designated HD 219134 h. It is now generally referred to by the HD 219134 h designation.
