= HD 219134 f =

Exoplanet located in the constellation Cassiopeia

Discovery
- Discovery date: 2015 November 17
- Detection method: radial velocity method

Orbital characteristics
- Apastron: 0.1679 (± 0.00908) AU
- Periastron: 0.1246 (± 0.00908) AU
- Semi-major axis: 0.1463 (± 0.0018); 0.14574 (± 2e-05) AU
- Eccentricity: 0.148 (± 0.047)
- Orbital period (sidereal): 22.805 (± 0.005) d
- Inclination: ?
- Star: HD 219134

Physical characteristics
- Mean radius: >1.31 (± 0.02) R_{🜨}
- Mass: >7.30 (± 0.40) M_{🜨}
- Mean density: <17.9 g cm^{−3}
- Surface gravity: <4.25 g
- Temperature: 522.6 K (249.5 °C; 481.0 °F)

HD 219134 f, also known as HR 8832 f, is an exoplanet orbiting around the K-type star HD 219134 in the constellation of Cassiopeia. It is a Super-Earth with a minimum mass of over 7 times that of Earth. Unlike HD 219134 b and HD 219134 c it was not observed by the Spitzer Space Telescope and thus its radius and density are unknown. Only a minimum radius can be given.

== Characteristics ==
=== Mass, Radius, and Temperature ===
HD 219134 f is known as a Super-Earth, a planet that's more massive than Earth but less massive than Uranus or Neptune. However, because it is not known to transit its star, only the minimum mass can be determined. The planet is at least 7.30 M_{🜨}, indicating that it could be anything from a dense rocky planet to a low-density ice giant. Gillon et al. gives the planet a minimum radius of about 1.31 R_{🜨}, which would result in an almost impossible density. For a more likely mixed composition of rock, water, and hydrogen, HD 219134 f would have a radius closer to about 2.10 R_{🜨}.

Being close to its star, HD 219134 f is hot, with an equilibrium temperature of 522.6 K (249.5 °C; 481.0 °F). Therefore, if a rocky planet, it is too hot for liquid water. It receives about 12 times the stellar flux as Earth.

=== Orbit ===
HD 219134 f has an orbital period lasting about 22.72 days, only about a quarter of Mercury's, which lasts about 88 days. The planet also has an orbital radius, or semi-major axis, of 0.146 AU. For comparison, Mercury orbits at 0.38 AU, and Earth at 1 AU. Because of this close proximity, HD 219134 f is likely tidally locked. The planet is near a 1:3 resonance with HD 219134 c and a 2:1 resonance with HD 219134 d.

=== Host Star ===
The planet HD 219134 f orbits the K3V orange dwarf HD 219134, also known as HR 8832. It is 79% the radius and 80% the mass of the Sun with 28% the luminosity. It has a temperature of 4699 K and is around 12.5 billion years old or less. For comparison, the Sun has a temperature of 5778 K and is 4.55 billion years old.

The apparent magnitude of the star, or how bright it appears from Earth, is around 5. Therefore, it is only just visible to the unaided eye.
