= Sigma Draconis =

Star in the constellation Draco

σ Draconis
- Location of σ Draconis (in red circle).

Observation data Epoch J2000 Equinox ICRS
- Constellation: Draco
- Right ascension: 19^{h} 32^{m} 21.59021^{s}
- Declination: +69° 39′ 40.2358″
- Apparent magnitude (V): 4.674

Characteristics
- Evolutionary stage: Main sequence
- Spectral type: K0 V
- U−B color index: +0.386
- B−V color index: +0.791
- Variable type: None

Astrometry
Radial velocity (R_{v})	26.55±0.13 km/s
Proper motion (μ)	RA: 597.384 mas/yr Dec.: −1738.286 mas/yr
Parallax (π)	173.4939±0.0748 mas
Distance	18.799 ± 0.008 ly (5.764 ± 0.002 pc)
Absolute magnitude (M_{V})	5.89

Details
Mass	0.84±0.02 M_{☉}
Radius	0.776±0.020 R_{☉}
Luminosity	0.44±0.03 L_{☉}
Surface gravity (log g)	4.33±0.04 cgs
Temperature	5,336±40 K
Metallicity [Fe/H]	−0.254 dex
Rotation	27.7±0.77 days
Rotational velocity (v sin i)	1.4 km/s
Age	4.54±1.54 Gyr

Other designations
- Alsafi, σ Draconis, Sig Dra, σ Dra, 61 Draconis, BD+69°1053, GJ 764, HD 185144, HIP 96100, HR 7462, LHS 477

Database references
SIMBAD	data
ARICNS	data

Sigma Draconis is a single star in the northern constellation of Draco. It has the proper name Alsafi /ælˈseɪfi/, while Sigma Draconis, which is latinised from σ Draconis and abbreviated Sig Dra or σ Dra, is the Bayer designation. It has an apparent visual magnitude of 4.7, which is bright enough to be faintly visible to the naked eye. Based on parallax measurements, this star is located at a distance of 18.8 light years from the Sun. It is receding from the Sun with a radial velocity of 26.6 km/s.

== Name ==
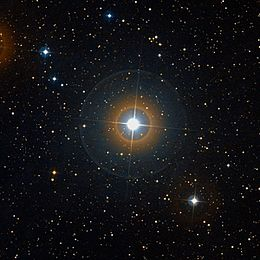
Photograph of Sigma Draconis (field of view about 0.5°)

σ Draconis (Latinised to Sigma Draconis) is the star's Bayer designation, established in 1603 as part of the Uranometria, a star catalogue produced by German celestial cartographer Johann Bayer.

It bore the traditional name Alsafi, derived from the Arabic Athāfi, itself erroneously transcribed from the Arabic plural Athāfiyy, by which the Bedouin nomads designated the tripods of their open-air kitchens. It was the name of an association of this star, Tau Draconis and Upsilon Draconis. According to a 1971 NASA memorandum, Athāfi or Alsafi was the title for three stars: Sigma Draconis as Alsafi, Tau Draconis as Athāfi I and Upsilon Draconis as Athāfi II. In 2016, the IAU organized a Working Group on Star Names (WGSN) to catalog and standardize proper names for stars. The WGSN approved the name Alsafi for Sigma Draconis on 30 June 2017 and it is now so included in the List of IAU-approved Star Names.

In Chinese, 天廚 (Tiān Chú), meaning Celestial Kitchen, refers to an asterism consisting of Sigma Draconis, Delta Draconis, Epsilon Draconis, Rho Draconis, 64 Draconis and Pi Draconis. Consequently, the Chinese name for Sigma Draconis itself is 天廚二 (Tiān Chú èr, English: the Second Star of Celestial Kitchen.)

== Properties ==
Sigma Draconis is a main sequence dwarf which has long served as a K0 V spectral standard star. Its classification as K0 V defines one of the anchor points of the Morgan–Keenan system that have remained unchanged since the original 1943 MKK Atlas. However, some modern spectroscopy gives it as classification of G9 V.

The radius of Sigma Draconis has been directly measured using interferometry with the CHARA array, which yields a result of 77.6% of the Sun's radius at the star's distance. It has 84% of the Sun's mass, but the luminosity of this star is only 42% that of the Sun. The projected rotation rate (v sin i) is relatively low at 1.4 km/s. It is considered a slightly metal-poor star, meaning that it has a lower proportion of elements with masses greater than helium when compared to the Sun.

The temperature, luminosity and surface activity appear to vary slightly in a manner very similar to the sunspot cycle, with a changing duration of 5 to 7 years. The total variability is among the lowest of all stars that have been measured by the Hipparcos spacecraft.

Sigma Draconis has a high proper motion, advancing across the celestial sphere at a rate of 1.835 arc seconds per year. The star made its perihelion passage about 46,300 years ago, when it came within 16.6 ly (5.1 pc). The components of Sigma Draconis's space velocity are U=+36, V=+40, and W=−10 km/s. This gives the star an unusually large orbital eccentricity about the Milky Way galaxy of 0.30 (compared to 0.06 for the Sun.) The mean galactocentric distance for the orbit is 10.3 kiloparsecs (about 34,000 light-years).

As of 2013, no Jupiter-size or larger companion had been detected about the star and there was no indication of excess infrared radiation that would be evidence of circumstellar matter (such as a debris disk).

== Search for planets ==
Between 2004 and 2013, extensive radial velocity measurements were gathered on Sigma Draconis using the High Resolution Echelle Spectrometer on the Keck Observatory. The Keck/HIRES data indicated a possible period of about 300 days and a likely alias period of 2,800 days. Adding data taken with the Automated Planet Finder at the Lick Observatory strengthened and narrowed the 300-day period while reducing the significance of the 2,800-day period. The combined analysis suggests there may be a Uranus-mass planet on a 308-day orbit, though the authors do not yet consider the discovery to be publishable as they have not yet attempted to rule out other non-planetary explanations for the velocity variations.

A 2017 study also using Keck/HIRES data did not find evidence of a planet; while a signal with a 2,600-day period was found, it was attributed to the star's magnetic activity cycle. A 2025 study detected variations with a period of 409.7 days, which is tentatively attributed by its activity cycle.

== See also ==
- List of nearest K-type stars
