= Kepler-443b =

Extrasolar planet

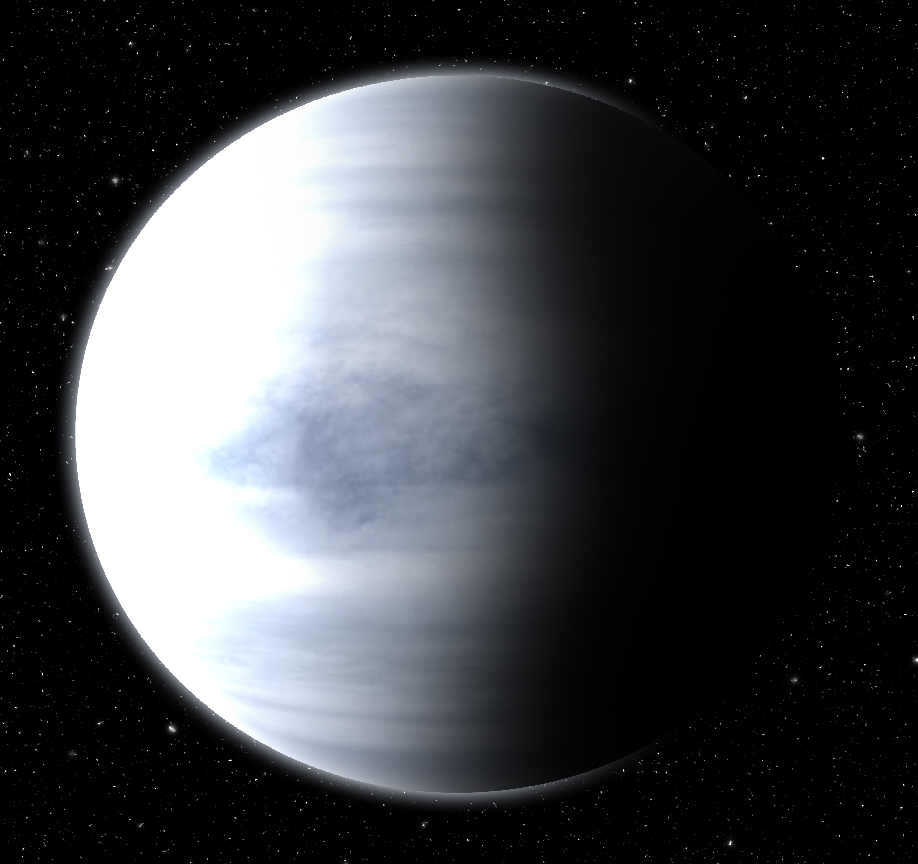

Discovery
- Discovered by: Guillermo Torres et al
- Discovery site: Kepler
- Discovery date: January 7, 2015
- Detection method: Transit method

Orbital characteristics
- Semi-major axis: 0.495 AU (74.1 million km)
- Eccentricity: ≥0.11
- Orbital period (sidereal): 177.6693 d
- Inclination: 89.94
- Time of periastron: JD 2455630.2460
- Star: Kepler-443

Physical characteristics
- Mean radius: 2.33 R_{🜨}

Kepler-443b is an exoplanet about 2,540 light-years from Earth. Kepler-443b orbits a K-type star called Kepler-443. It takes 177.6693 days to orbit, with an inclination of 89.94°, a semimajor axis of 0.495 AU, and an eccentricity of at least 0.11.

Kepler-443b has a mass of 6.04 Earth masses, a radius of 2.33 Earth radii, and a temperature of 247 kelvin. This planet has an 89.9 percent chance of being in the star's habitable zone. Kepler-443b may be habitable, but the planet has only a 4.9 percent chance of being rocky. It is much more likely to be a water world or a mini-Neptune.
