= Nonprofit Adopt a Star =

U.S. nonprofit organization

White Dwarf Research Corporation
- Formation: 1999
- Type: 501(c)(3) non-profit EIN: 74-2924755
- Purpose: Dedicated to scientific research and public education.
- Location: Golden, Colorado, USA
- Region served: worldwide
- Board of Directors: Dr. Travis Metcalfe (Chair) Dr. Margarida Cunha; Dr. Gerald Handler; Dr. Christoffer Karoff; Dr. Katrien Kolenberg Dr. Mike Montgomery
- Website: wdrc.org

Nonprofit Adopt a Star is a charitable fundraising program operated by White Dwarf Research Corporation, a 501c3 nonprofit organization based in Golden, Colorado USA. The program features the targets of NASA space telescopes that are searching for planets around other stars, and it uses the proceeds to support research by an international team of astronomers known as the Kepler/TESS Asteroseismic Science Consortium.

Supporters of the program receive a personalized “Certificate of Adoption” by email, and their selected star is updated in a public database, ensuring that each star can only be adopted once. The database shows an image of the star in Google Sky, along with the constellation name and coordinates, a link to a star chart, and a link to additional information about the star from the SIMBAD astronomical database.

== History ==
The program was started in January 2008 by American astronomer Travis Metcalfe, and was originally known as "The Pale Blue Dot Project".

The original database only included stars observed by NASA’s Kepler space telescope, which operated from 2009 to 2013. After losing the ability to point at the original star field, the mission was renamed K2 in 2014 and observed a series of star fields near the ecliptic before running out of fuel in 2018. The launch of NASA’s Transiting Exoplanet Survey Satellite (TESS) in 2018 expanded the database to include bright stars in every constellation.

Proceeds from the program have supported several research projects of the international team, including characterization of the smallest known planet around Kepler-37 and the oldest known planetary system around Kepler-444, both discovered by the Kepler mission.

The phrase "Adopt a Star" is registered as a charitable fundraising service with the U.S. Patent and Trademark Office, but trademark infringement has continued by several for-profit companies.

== In popular culture ==
- In August 2009, the estate of Carl Sagan threatened legal action after a news article noted that the project was called Pale Blue Dot to echo the popular astronomer's description of the Earth as seen from space.
- In July 2014, Ukrainian astronomers adopted a star with a disparaging nickname for Russian president Vladimir Putin and the insult went viral on social media.
- In May 2022, Gucci adopted a star for each of the guests at their space-themed Cosmogonie fashion show, held at the Castel del Monte in Italy.
