= Wolf 1061 =

Red dwarf star in the constellation Ophiuchus

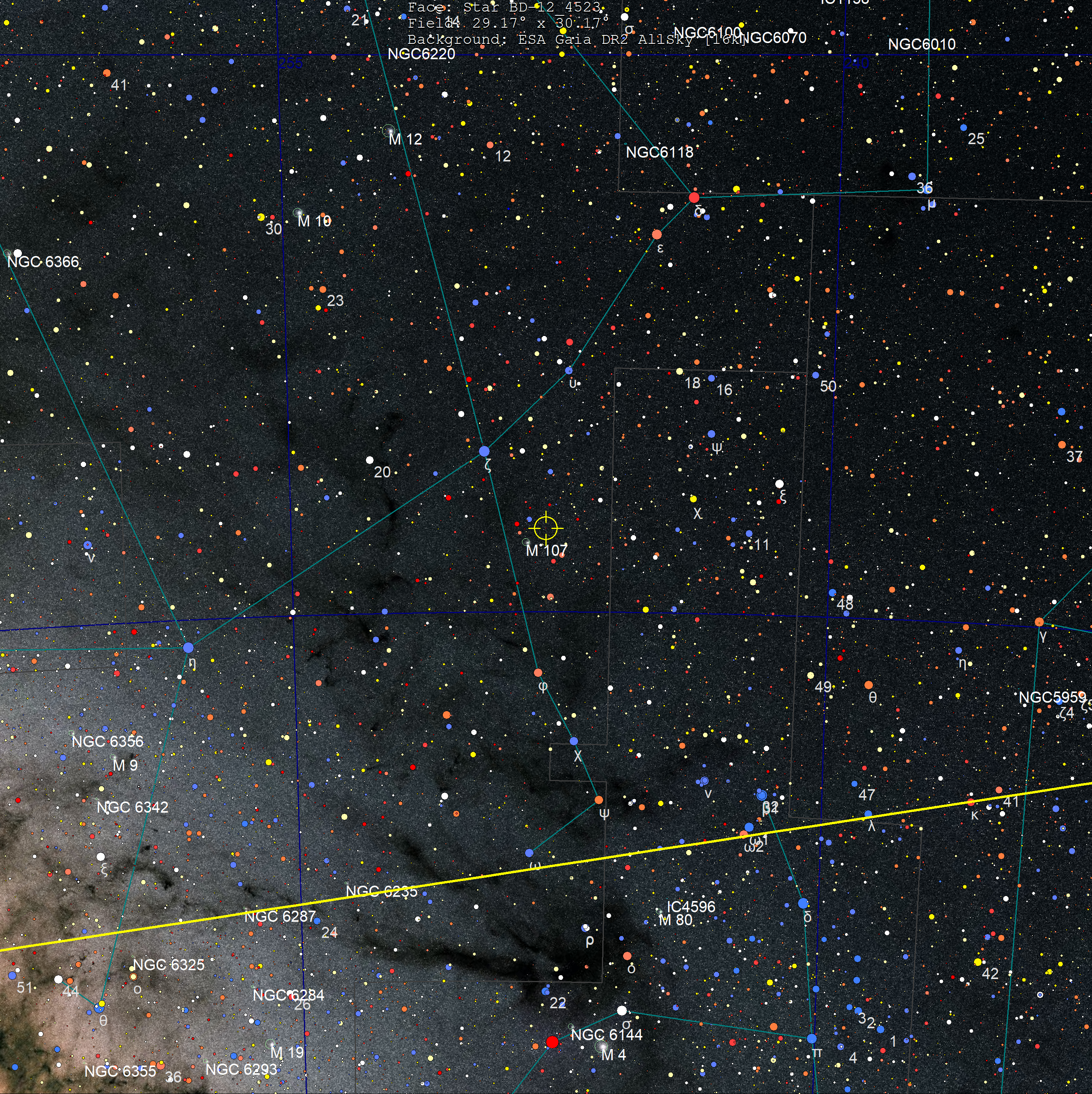
- Location of Wolf 1061 in the constellation Ophiuchus

Observation data Epoch J2000 Equinox ICRS
- Constellation: Ophiuchus
- Right ascension: 16^{h} 30^{m} 18.05839^{s}
- Declination: −12° 39′ 45.3212″
- Apparent magnitude (V): 10.05 - 10.10

Characteristics
- Spectral type: M3.5V
- U−B color index: +1.20
- B−V color index: +1.57
- Variable type: BY Draconis

Astrometry
| Radial velocity (R_{v}) | −21.80±0.13 km/s |
| Proper motion (μ) | RA: −94.210 mas/yr Dec.: −1,183.917 mas/yr |
| Parallax (π) | 232.1390±0.0268 mas |
| Distance | 14.050 ± 0.002 ly (4.3078 ± 0.0005 pc) |
| Absolute magnitude (M_{V}) | 11.87 |

Details
| Mass | 0.304±0.007 M_{☉} |
| Radius | 0.319±0.007 R_{☉} |
| Luminosity (bolometric) | 0.0110±0.0001 L_{☉} |
| Luminosity (visual, L_{V}) | 0.0015 L_{☉} |
| Temperature | 3,307+38 −36 K |
| Metallicity [Fe/H] | −0.09±0.09 dex |
| Rotation | 95 d |

Other designations
- BD−12°4523, G 153-058, GCTP 3746.00, GJ 628, HIP 80824, LHS 419, Vys 164

Database references
| SIMBAD | data |
| Exoplanet Archive | data |
| ARICNS | data |

Wolf 1061 (also known as HIP 80824 and V2306 Ophiuchi) is a red dwarf star located about 14.1 light-years (4.3 parsecs) away in the constellation Ophiuchus. It is the 36th-closest-known star system to the Sun and has a relatively high proper motion of 1.2 seconds of arc per year. Wolf 1061 does not have any unusual spectroscopic features.

== The star ==
Wolf 1061 was first cataloged in 1919 by German astronomer Max Wolf when he published a list of dim stars that had high proper motions. Wolf 1061's name originates from this list. A seven years study found no evidence of photometric transits and confirms the radial velocity signals are not due to stellar activity. The habitable zone estimate for the system lies between approximately 0.1 and 0.2 AU from the star.

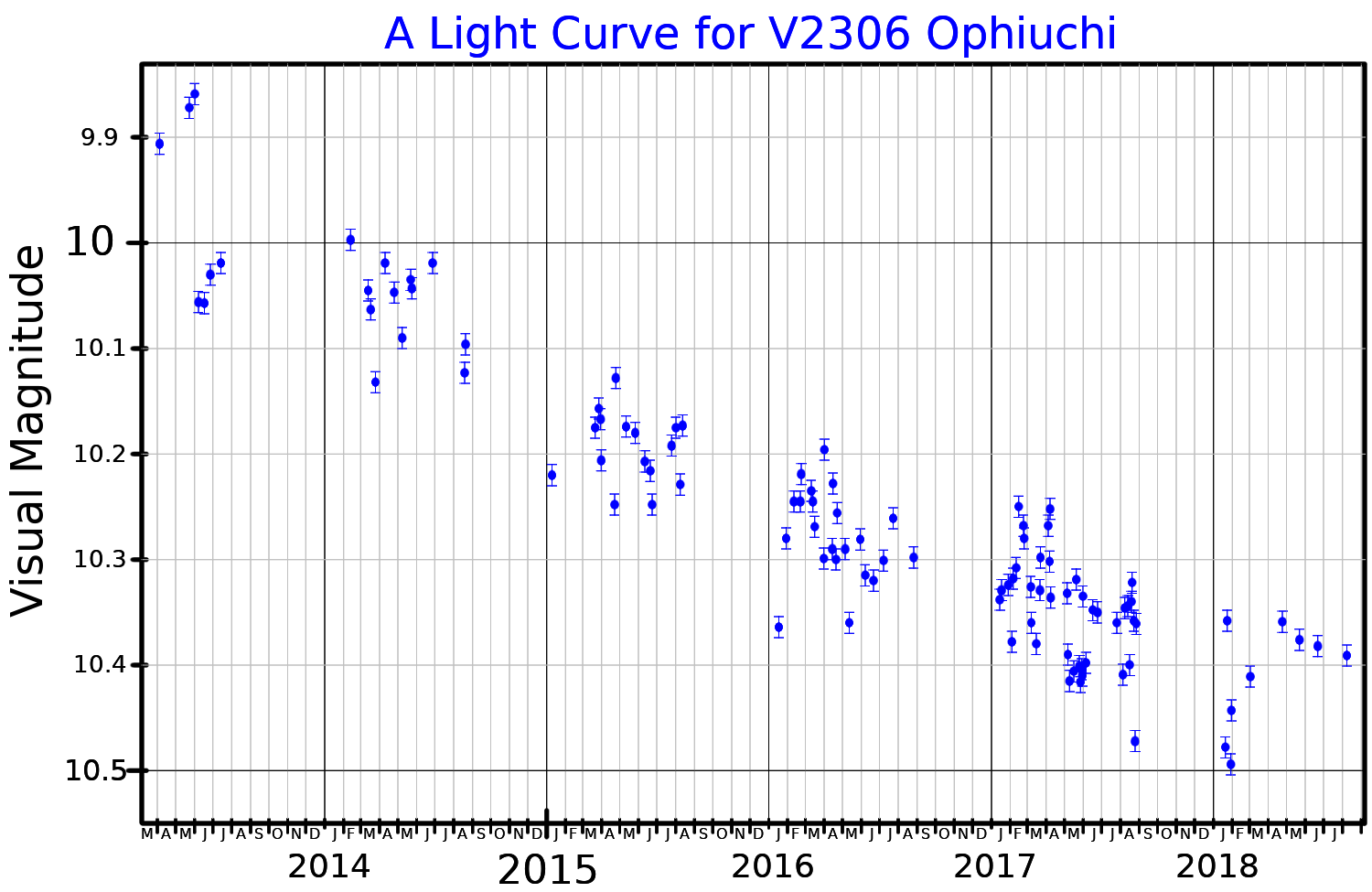
A visual band light curve for V2306 Ophiuchi, plotted from ASAS-SN data

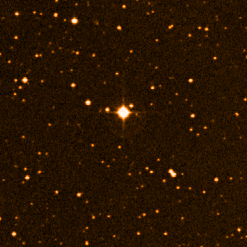
The star

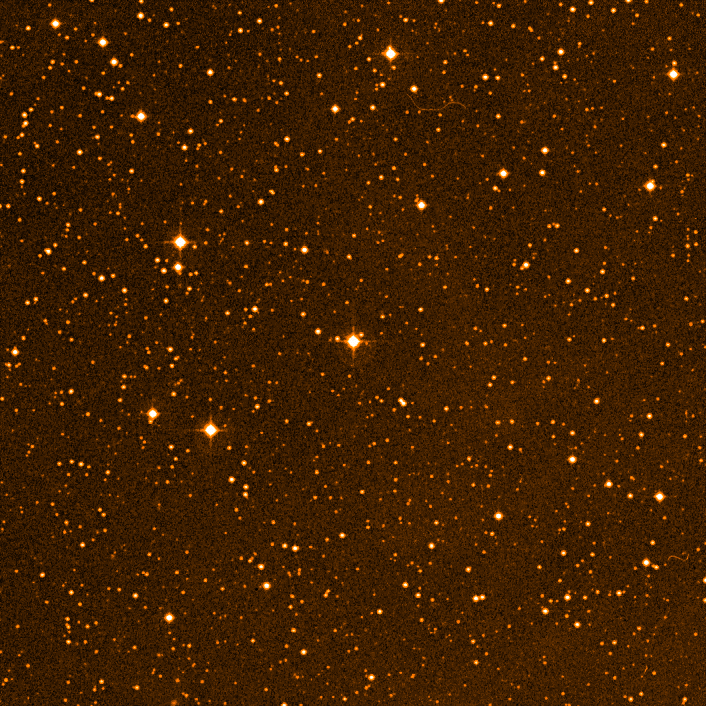
Wolf 1061 and neighboring stars

== Planetary system ==
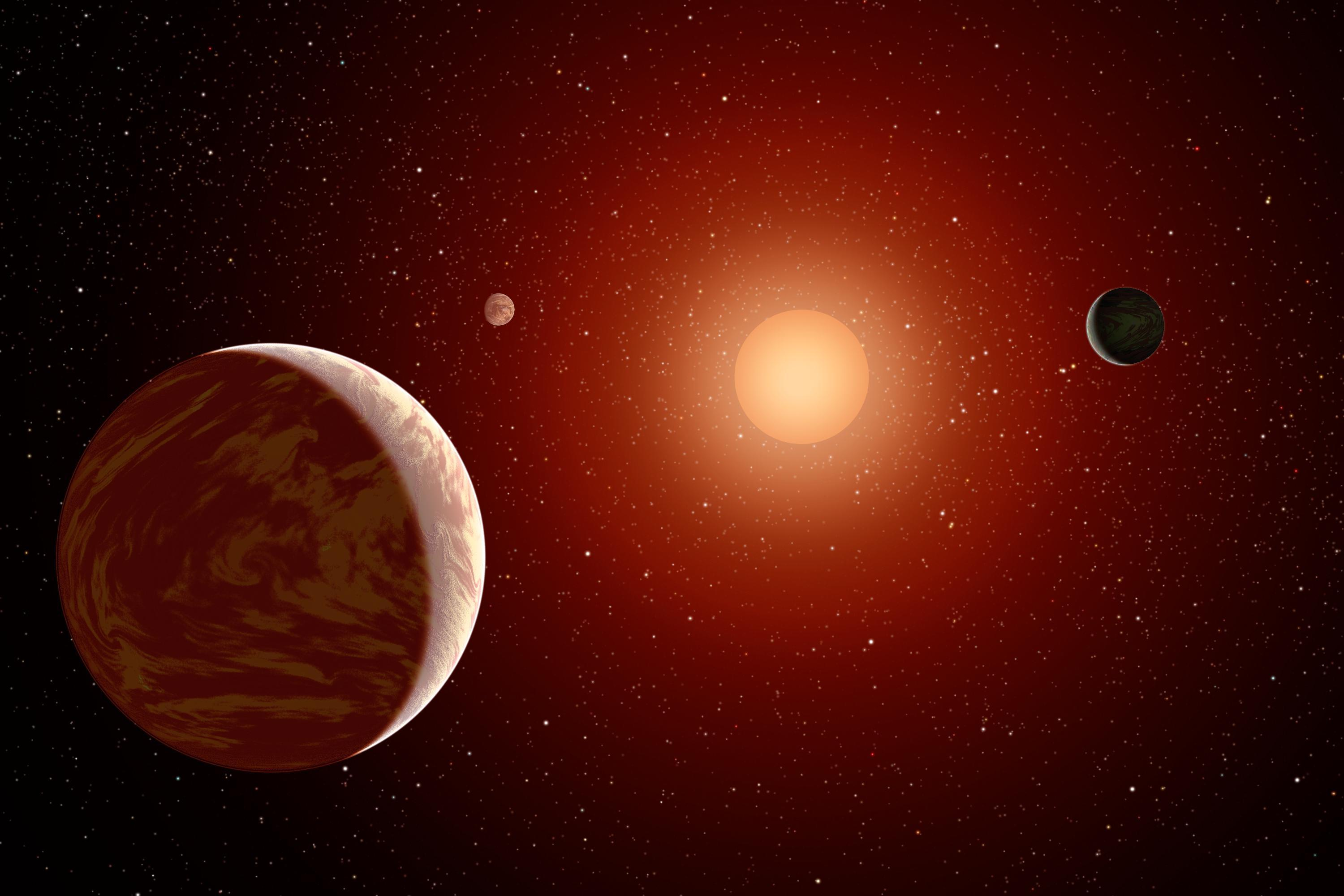
Artist's impression of exoplanets orbiting a red dwarf

In December 2015, a team of astronomers from the University of New South Wales announced the discovery of three planets orbiting Wolf 1061. The planets were detected by analyzing 10 years of observations of the Wolf 1061 system by the HARPS spectrograph at La Silla Observatory in Chile. The team used archive radial velocity measurements of the star's spectrum in the HARPS data and, along with 8 years of photometry from the All Sky Automated Survey, discovered two definite planets with orbital periods of around 4.9 and 17.9 days and a very likely third with a period of 67.3 days.

All three planets have masses low enough that they are likely to be rocky planets similar to the inner planets of the Solar System although their actual sizes and densities are currently unknown. However, this information could be determined if the planets happen to transit in front of Wolf 1061 when viewed from Earth. Because all three planets orbit close to the star and have short orbital periods, there is a chance that this will occur. The University of New South Wales team estimated the chances of a transit at around 14% for planet b, 6% for planet c, and 3% for planet d.

One of the planets, Wolf 1061 c, is a super-Earth located near the inner edge of the star's habitable zone, which conservatively extends from 0.11 to 0.21 AU, or at most from 0.09 to 0.23 AU. It is one of the closest known potentially habitable planets to Earth after Proxima b, Ross 128 b, and Luyten b. The next planet out, Wolf 1061 d, could be marginally habitable depending on its atmosphere's composition as it orbits just beyond the habitable zone.

In March 2017, another team of astronomers re-analyzed the system using the HARPS spectrograph. They found planets b and c to be quite similar to their originally reported parameters, but found that planet d was more massive and in a larger, more eccentric orbit. The team was also able to find updated parameters for the host star. Their results showed that Wolf 1061 c is slightly smaller, yet closer to the inner edge of the habitable zone.

The Wolf 1061 planetary system
| Companion (in order from star) | Mass | Semimajor axis (AU) | Orbital period (days) | Eccentricity | Inclination (°) | Radius |
|---|---|---|---|---|---|---|
| b | ≥1.91 ± 0.25 M_{🜨} | 0.0375 ± 0.0012 | 4.8869 ± 0.0005 | 0.15 ^{+0.13}_{−0.10} | — | 1.2 (estimated) R_{🜨} |
| c | ≥3.41 ^{+0.43}_{−0.41} M_{🜨} | 0.0890 ± 0.003 | 17.8719 ± 0.0059 | 0.11 ^{+0.10}_{−0.07} | — | 1.45 (estimated) R_{🜨} |
| d | ≥7.7 ^{+1.12}_{−1.06} M_{🜨} | 0.470 ± 0.016 | 217.21 ^{+0.55}_{−0.52} | 0.55 ^{+0.08}_{−0.09} | — | 2.2 (estimated) R_{🜨} |

== See also ==
- List of multiplanetary systems
- List of nearest stars and brown dwarfs
