= Kepler-444 =

Triple star system in the constellation of Lyra

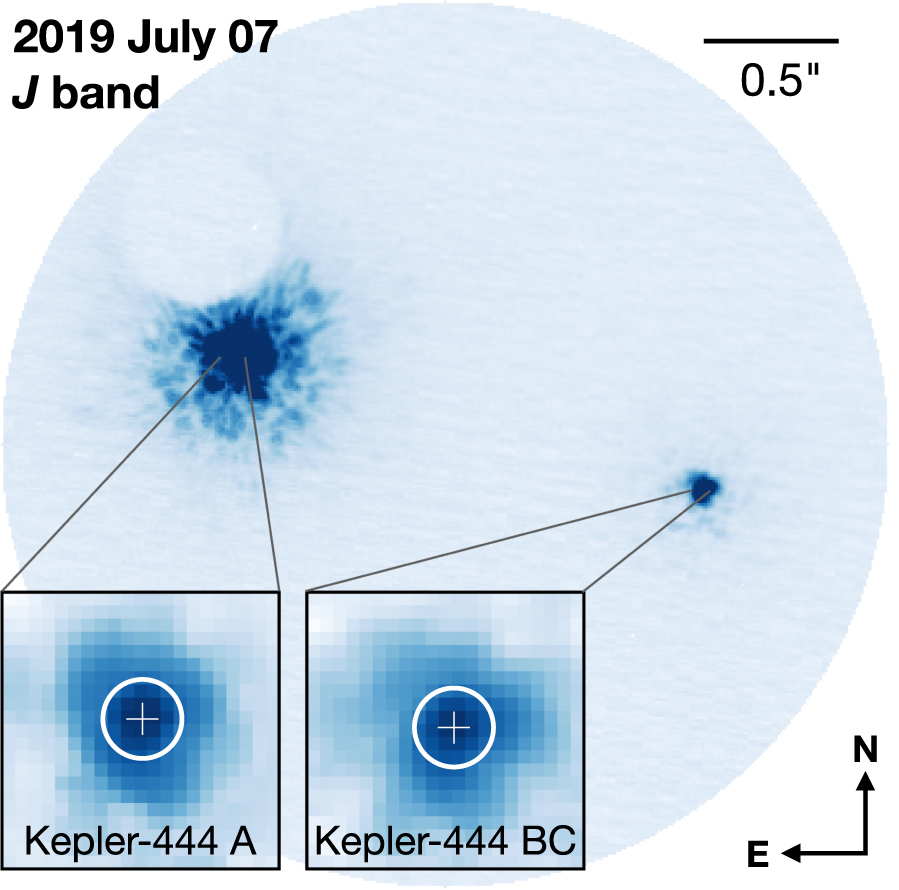
- Adaptive optics image of the Kepler-444 system from Zhang et al.

Observation data Epoch J2000 Equinox 2000
- Constellation: Lyra
- Kepler-444 A
- Right ascension: 19^{h} 19^{m} 00.5489^{s}
- Declination: +41° 38′ 04.582″
- Apparent magnitude (V): 8.86
- Kepler-444 B/C
- Right ascension: 19^{h} 19^{m} 00.3922^{s}
- Declination: +41° 38′ 04.013″
- Apparent magnitude (V): 12.49

Characteristics

A
- Evolutionary stage: main sequence
- Spectral type: K0V
- U−B color index: +0.34
- B−V color index: +0.81

BC
- Evolutionary stage: main sequence + main sequence
- Spectral type: M + M

Astrometry

Kepler-444 A
Radial velocity (R_{v})	−123.05±0.17 km/s
Proper motion (μ)	RA: 94.639(13) mas/yr Dec.: −632.269(14) mas/yr
Parallax (π)	27.3578±0.0125 mas
Distance	119.22 ± 0.05 ly (36.55 ± 0.02 pc)

Kepler-444 B/C
Proper motion (μ)	RA: 94.508(55) mas/yr Dec.: −630.781(78) mas/yr
Parallax (π)	27.6079±0.0545 mas
Distance	118.1 ± 0.2 ly (36.22 ± 0.07 pc)

Orbit
Primary	A
Name	BC
Period (P)	324+31 −25 yr
Semi-major axis (a)	52.2+3.3 −2.7 AU
Eccentricity (e)	0.55+0.05 −0.05
Inclination (i)	85.4+0.3 −0.4°
Longitude of the node (Ω)	250.7+0.2 −0.2°
Periastron epoch (T)	JD 2537060+10881 −8533
Argument of periastron (ω) (secondary)	227.3+6.5 −5.2°

Details

A
Mass	0.754±0.030 M_{☉}
Radius	0.753±0.010 R_{☉}
Surface gravity (log g)	4.595±0.060 cgs
Temperature	5,046±74.0 K
Metallicity [Fe/H]	−0.55±0.07 dex
Rotation	49.40±6.04 d
Age	11.00±0.8 Gyr

B
Mass	0.307+0.009 −0.008 M_{☉}
Radius	0.36 R_{☉}
Surface gravity (log g)	5.0±0.2 cgs
Temperature	3,464±200 K

C
Mass	0.296±0.008 M_{☉}
Surface gravity (log g)	~5 cgs
Temperature	3,500 - 4,000 K

Other designations
- BD+41°3306, WDS J19190+4138, KOI-3158, KIC 6278762, 2MASS J19190052+4138043
- Kepler-444A: HIP 94931, LHS 3450, TYC 3129-00329-1, 2MASS J19190052+4138043, Gaia DR2 2101486923385239808
- Kepler-444BC: Gaia DR2 2101486923382009472

Database references
SIMBAD	data
- B/C
Exoplanet Archive	data

Kepler-444 (or KOI-3158, KIC 6278762, 2MASS J19190052+4138043, BD+41°3306) is a triple star system, estimated to be 11.2 billion years old (more than 80% of the age of the universe), approximately 119 light-years (36 pc) away from Earth in the constellation Lyra. On 27 January 2015, the Kepler spacecraft is reported to have confirmed the detection of five sub-Earth-sized rocky exoplanets orbiting the main star. The star is a K-type main sequence star. All of the planets are far too close to their star to harbour life forms.

== Discovery ==
Preliminary results of the planetary system around Kepler-444 were first announced at the second Kepler Science Conference in 2013. At that conference, the star was known as KOI-3158.

Characterization of the host star with asteroseismology was supported in part by the Nonprofit Adopt a Star program operated by White Dwarf Research Corporation, a crowd funded non-profit organization.

== History ==
On 28 January 2015, astronomers using data from NASA's Kepler Mission discovered an ancient triple star system with five Earth-sized planets in Kepler-444. Evidential speculations in research show Kepler-444 formed 11.2 billion years ago, when the universe was less than 20 percent of its current age, making it two and a half times older than the Earth.

== Characteristics ==
The star, Kepler-444, is approximately 11.2 billion years old, whereas the Sun is only 4.6 billion years old. The age is that of Kepler-444 A, an orange main sequence star of spectral type K0. Despite this great age, it is in middle of its main-sequence lifespan, much like the Sun.

The original research on Kepler-444 was published in The Astrophysical Journal on 27 January 2015 under the title "An ancient extrasolar system with five sub-Earth-size planets" by a team of 40 authors.

== Stellar system ==
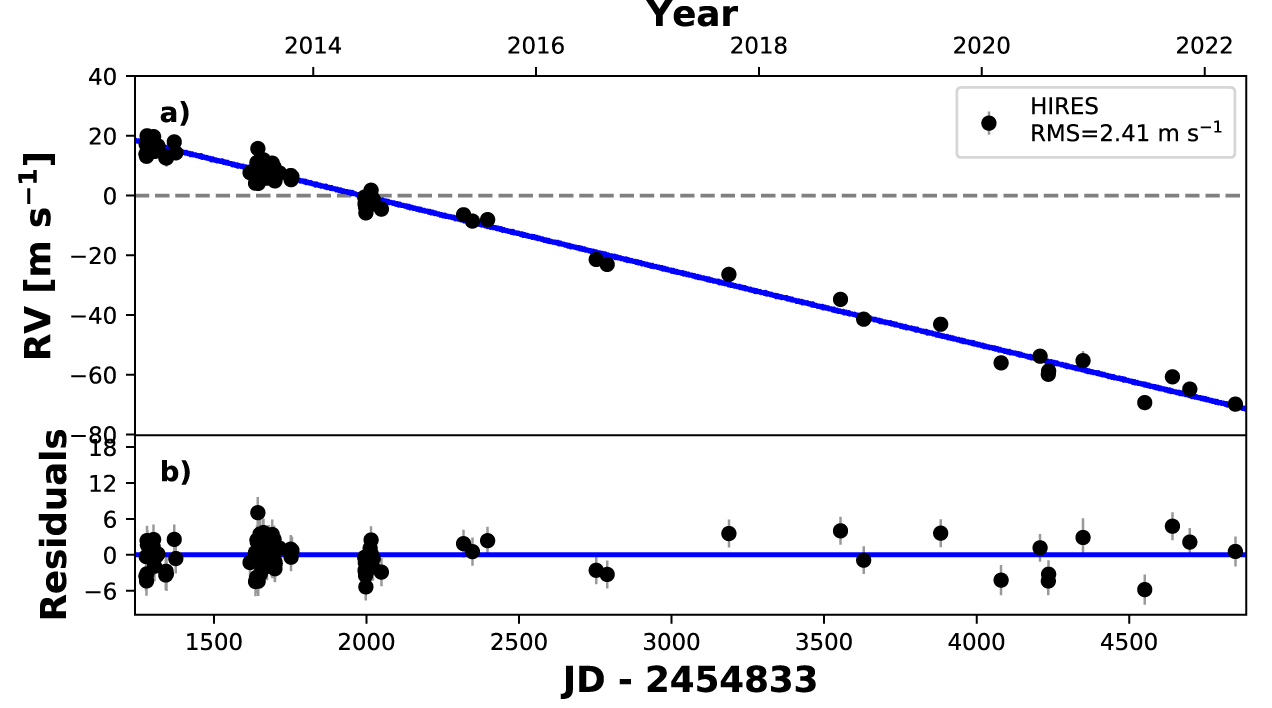
Radial velocity time series of Kepler 444 showing linear trend in velocities caused by the pair of M-dwarf stars from Weiss et al.

The Kepler-444 system consists of the planet hosting primary and a pair of M-dwarf stars. The M-dwarfs orbit each other at a distance of less than 0.3 AU while the pair orbits the primary in a highly eccentric 324-year orbit. The pair comes within 23.55 AU of the primary potentially truncating the protoplanetary disk from which the planets formed at 8 AU. This would have depleted the availability of solid material to form the observed planets.

Previous stellar orbit solution was ever more extreme, period was shorter (211 years) and eccentricity was much larger (e=0.865), moving periastron to 5 AU, severely reducing the estimated protoplanetary disk size to 1–2 AU and its estimated mass from ~600 to ~4 Earth masses.

Radial velocity measurements of Kepler-444 show a linear trend, which aligns well with the orbit outlined by Dupuy et al. (see diagram above)

== Planetary system ==
All five rocky exoplanets (Kepler-444b; Kepler-444c; Kepler-444d; Kepler-444e; Kepler-444f) are confirmed, smaller than the size of Venus (but bigger than Mercury) and each of the exoplanets completes an orbit around the host star in less than 10 days. Thus, the planetary system is very compact, as even the furthest known planet, Kepler-444f, still orbits closer to the star than Mercury is to the Sun. According to NASA, no life as we know it could exist on these hot exoplanets, due to their close orbital distances to the host star. To keep the known planetary system stable, no additional giant planets can be located within 5.5 AU of the parent star.

Moreover, the system is pervaded by high-order resonance chain: period ratios are 4:5, 3:4, 4:5, 4:5. This tight chain is unperturbed and very likely continues farther from Kepler-444A.

A marginally significant peak appears at 72 days in the radial velocity data when the linear trend attributed to the stellar companions is subtracted. However, this signal suggests an eccentricity that is unphysically high, leading to orbits that would intersect the known planets. The signal likely stems from complexities within the long-term radial velocity signal of the Kepler-444 ABC system and may also be associated with the orbit of the BC pair.

The Kepler-444 planetary system (Note: The eccentricity has a non-Gaussian posterior distribution and so the median is an overestimate of the true eccentricity.)
Companion (in order from star)	Mass	Semimajor axis (AU)	Orbital period (days)	Eccentricity	Inclination (°)	Radius
b	<0.079 M_{🜨}	0.04178±0.00079	3.6001053+0.0000083 −0.0000080	0.16+0.21 −0.10	88.0+1.2 −0.6	0.406+0.013 −0.013 R_{🜨}
c	<0.16 M_{🜨}	0.04881±0.00093	4.5458841+0.0000070 −0.0000071	0.31+0.12 −0.15	88.2+1.2 −1.0	0.521+0.017 −0.016 R_{🜨}
d	0.036+0.065 −0.020 M_{🜨}	0.0600±0.0011	6.189392+0.000012 −0.000012	0.18+0.16 −0.12	88.16+0.81 −0.55	0.540+0.017 −0.016 R_{🜨}
e	0.034+0.059 −0.019 M_{🜨}	0.0696±0.0013	7.743493+0.000017 −0.000016	0.10+0.20 −0.07	89.13+0.54 −0.52	0.555+0.018 −0.016 R_{🜨}
f	<0.22 M_{🜨}	0.0811±0.0015	9.740486+0.000013 −0.000013	0.29+0.20 −0.19	87.96+0.36 −0.31	0.767+0.025 −0.024 R_{🜨}

== See also ==
- Kepler-80 - most compact 6-planet system discovered so far
- List of extrasolar planets
- PSR B1620-26 - an ancient planetary system in Messier 4
