= HD 219134 =

Star in the constellation Cassiopeia

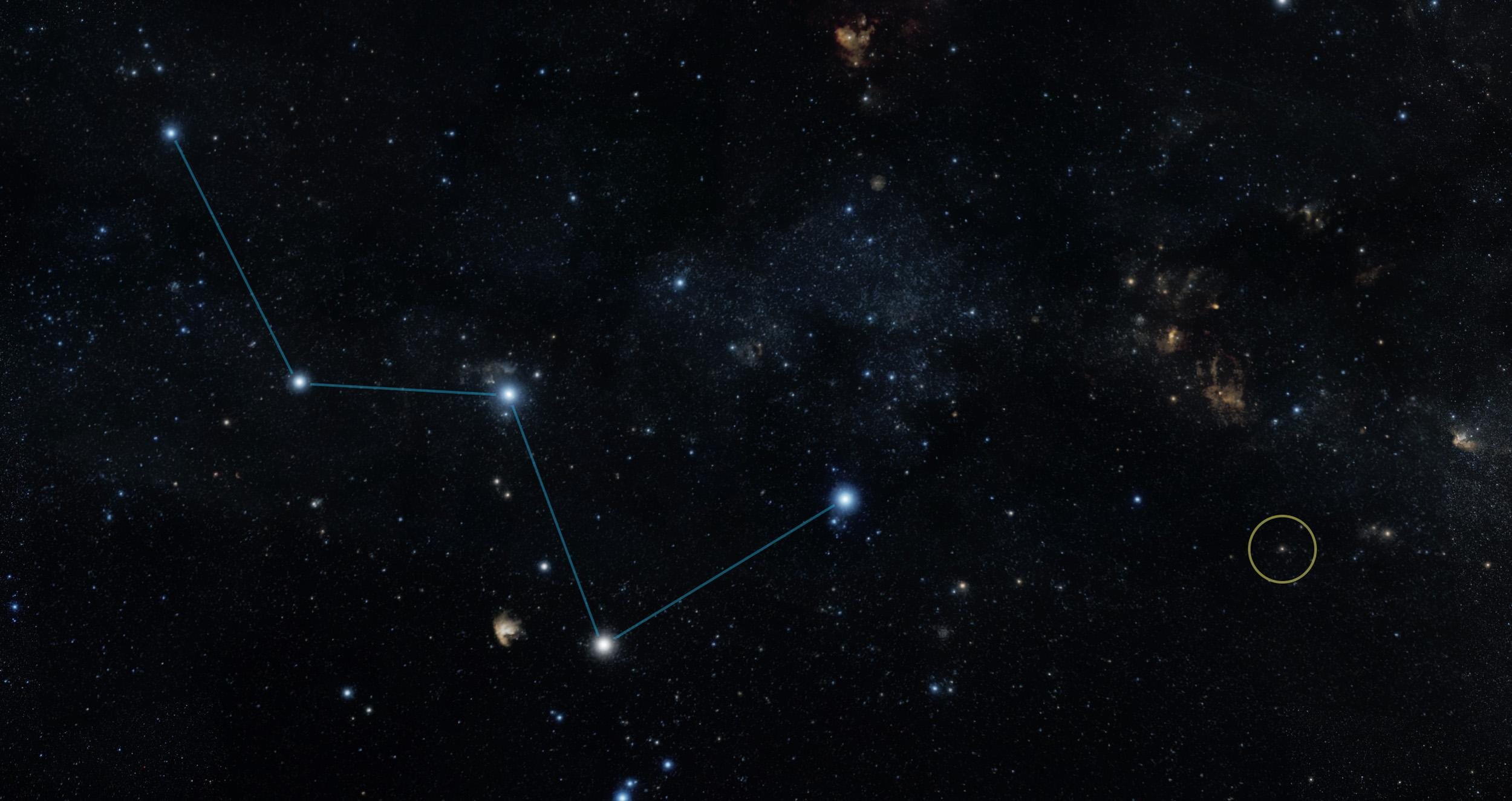
- Star HD 219134 (circled) lies just off the "W" shape of the constellation Cassiopeia.

Observation data Epoch J2000 Equinox ICRS
- Constellation: Cassiopeia
- Right ascension: 23^{h} 13^{m} 16.97496^{s}
- Declination: +57° 10′ 06.0838″
- Apparent magnitude (V): 5.574

Characteristics
- Evolutionary stage: main sequence
- Spectral type: K3V
- U−B color index: +0.902
- B−V color index: +0.983
- Variable type: Suspected

Astrometry
Radial velocity (R_{v})	−18.68±0.12 km/s
Proper motion (μ)	RA: 2074.414 mas/yr Dec.: 294.452 mas/yr
Parallax (π)	152.8640±0.0494 mas
Distance	21.336 ± 0.007 ly (6.542 ± 0.002 pc)
Absolute magnitude (M_{V})	6.46

Details
Mass	0.779±0.016 M_{☉}
Radius	0.753±0.005 R_{☉}
Luminosity	0.271±0.008 L_{☉}
Habitable zone inner limit	0.467 au
Habitable zone outer limit	0.926 au
Surface gravity (log g)	4.576±0.003 cgs
Temperature	4,798±41 K
Metallicity [Fe/H]	+0.097±0.051 dex
Rotation	41.0±2.4 days
Rotational velocity (v sin i)	6.94 km/s
Age	8.92±0.91 Gyr

Other designations
- BD+56 2966, FK5 875, Bradley 3077, GCTP 5616.00, Gl 892, HD 219134, HIP 114622, HR 8832, LFT 1767, LHS 71, LTT 16826, SAO 35236

Database references
SIMBAD	data
Exoplanet Archive	data
ARICNS	data

HD 219134 (also known as Gliese 892 or HR 8832) is a main-sequence star in the constellation of Cassiopeia. It is smaller and less luminous than the Sun, with a spectral class of K3V, which makes it an orange-hued star. HD 219134 is relatively close to our system, with an estimated distance of 21.34 light years. This star is close to the limit of apparent magnitude that can still be seen by the unaided eye. The limit is considered to be magnitude 6 for most observers.

== Host star ==
HD 219134 is a main sequence star with a spectral classification of K3V. It has a mass and radius about three quarters that of the Sun, is somewhat cooler than the Sun at 4817 K, and only 27% of its luminosity.

This star has a magnitude 9.4 optical companion. The high proper motion of HD 219134 means that the separation of the companion changed from 102.3″ in 1852 to 271.6″ in 2002. The companion is a subgiant over fifty times further away than HD 219134.

== Planetary system ==
HD 219134 has a system of at least five known exoplanets. The innermost planet, HD 219134 b, is a rocky super-Earth based on size (1.6 Earth radii), and density (6.4 grams per cubic cm). This and three additional exoplanets; one super-Earth (designated c and later found to be rocky as well), one Neptunian world (d), and one Jovian world (e); were deduced using HARPS-N radial velocity data by Motalebi et al. in 2015. Two months later, Vogt et al. published a paper on this system which found a 6-planet solution, with planets b, c & d corresponding to those in Motalebi et al., f & g being new planets, and h corresponding to Motalebi's e but with different, and more accurate, estimated parameters.

A number of independent studies have been done regarding the planetary system of HD 219134, with some of their results conflicting with each other. As of March 2017, the star is known to have at least 5 planets, with two of them (HD 219134 b and c) known to be transiting, rocky super-Earths. While a 2016 study suggested that the radial velocity signal corresponding to planet f might be caused by stellar activity, it has been confirmed by subsequent studies in 2017 and 2021. Planet g, with a 94-day period, has not been detected by subsequent studies, but some studies have found evidence of a 192-day signal which may be the true period of planet g. However, the planetary nature of this signal is unconfirmed.

In 2026, the inclination of the outer planet was measured with astrometry.

The HD 219134 planetary system
Companion (in order from star)	Mass	Semimajor axis (AU)	Orbital period (days)	Eccentricity	Inclination (°)	Radius
b	4.61±0.20 M_{🜨}	0.03754±0.00075	3.092926+68 −67	0.03671+0.00086 −0.00091	85.05±0.09	1.554±0.056 R_{🜨}
c	4.24±0.23 M_{🜨}	0.06322±0.00125	6.76379+0.00059 −0.00057	0.18+0.13 −0.12	87.28±0.10	1.465±0.048 R_{🜨}
f	≥7.12±0.43 M_{🜨}	0.14163±0.00280	22.7931+0.0049 −0.0052	0.063+0.069 −0.045	—	≥1.262±0.028 (Note: Predicted radius assuming a pure iron composition) R_{🜨}
d	≥15.8±0.7 M_{🜨}	0.22940±0.00460	46.7430+0.0100 −0.0098	0.048+0.044 −0.033	—	≥1.554±0.027 R_{🜨}
h (e)	0.413+0.083 −0.052 M_{J}	3.08+0.12 −0.13	2,212+14 −13	0.143±0.031	68+33 −19	—

=== Habitable zone ===
The conservative habitable zone (CHZ) of HD 219134 is estimated to extend from 0.516 to 0.948 AU. As of 2024, none of the planets orbiting the star are confirmed to orbit inside the habitable zone. The planet candidate HD 219134 g may orbit slightly interior to the inner edge of the habitable zone based on its initially published parameters, or may orbit within the habitable zone based on a more recent estimated orbital period of 192 days and semi-major axis of 0.603 AU. This planet is significantly more massive than Earth and therefore it likely retains a dense atmosphere, comparable to the Solar System's ice giants (see Mini-Neptune).

== See also ==
- List of nearest K-type stars
