= K2-28 =

Metal-rich red dwarf Star in the constellation Aquarius

Observation data Epoch J2000 Equinox ICRS
- Constellation: Aquarius
- Right ascension: 22^{h} 22^{m} 29.8611^{s}
- Declination: −07° 57′ 19.853″
- Apparent magnitude (V): 16.06

Characteristics
- Evolutionary stage: main sequence
- Spectral type: M4V
- Apparent magnitude (J): 11.695±0.030
- Apparent magnitude (H): 11.028±0.023
- Apparent magnitude (K): 10.746±0.023
- Variable type: Planetary transit variable

Astrometry
Radial velocity (R_{v})	11.7 km/s
Proper motion (μ)	RA: −254.604(41) mas/yr Dec.: −194.554(30) mas/yr
Parallax (π)	15.8734±0.0343 mas
Distance	205.5 ± 0.4 ly (63.0 ± 0.1 pc)

Details
Mass	0.257±0.048 M_{☉}
Radius	0.288±0.028 R_{☉}
Luminosity	0.0118 L_{☉}
Surface gravity (log g)	4.93±0.04 cgs
Temperature	3214±60 K
Metallicity [Fe/H]	0.26±0.10 dex

Other designations
- LP 700-6, NLTT 53655, EPIC 206318379, Gaia DR2 2622296783699476864

Database references
SIMBAD	data

K2-28 is a metal rich M4-type main sequence star. One confirmed transiting exoplanet is known to orbit this star. There is another star 5.2 arcseconds to the north–east of K2-28. However, this star has a different proper motion, and is therefore physically unrelated and probably a background star.

== Planetary system ==
=== Discovery ===
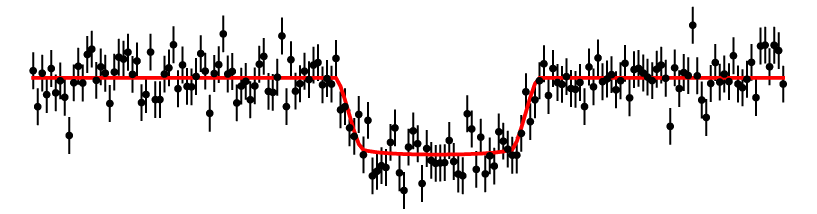
K2-28 transit light curve from the Spitzer Space Telescope.

K2-28b was first noticed as a candidate extrasolar planet by Vanderburg et al. in 2016, who, in a search of 59,174 stars from the Kepler space telescope's first year of K2 observations, found 234 planetary candidates. Shortly thereafter the K2-ESPRINT Project confirmed that the candidate was a super-Earth sized planet in a close orbit around a red dwarf star.

=== Characteristics ===
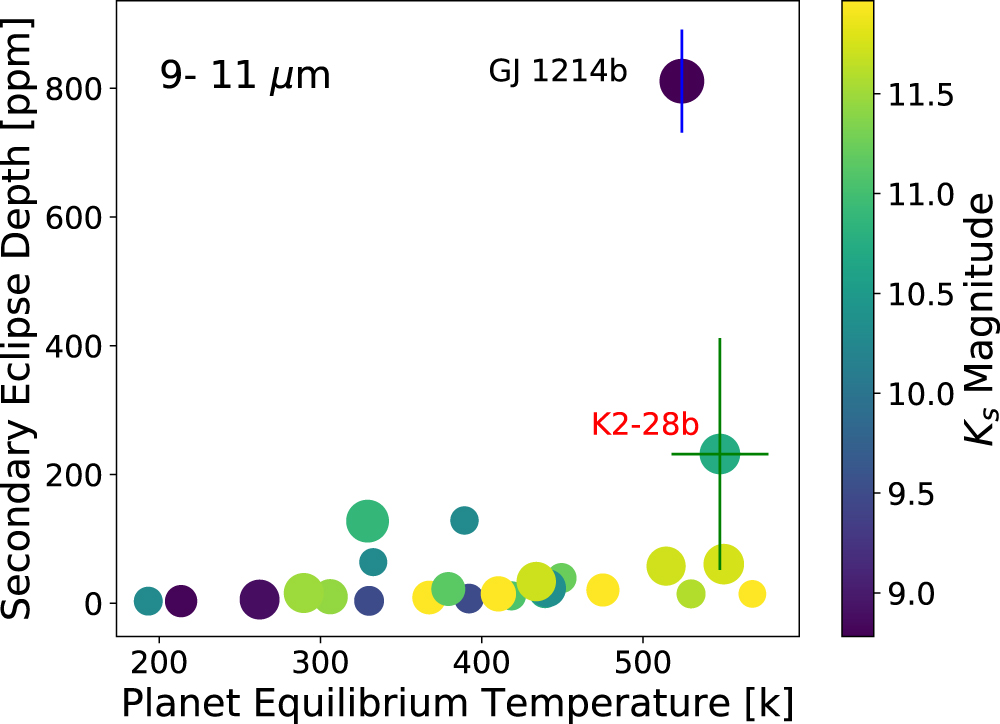
Secondary eclipse depth vs. temperature of small and cool planets orbiting relatively bright M-dwarfs

K2-28b is a sub-Neptune sized planet orbiting its star in only 2.26 days. Despite its short orbital period the equilibrium temperature of the planet is a relatively low 500 Kelvin due to the low luminosity of the parent star. Because of the very small size of the parent star, this planet is a particularly favorable target for transmission spectroscopy by the James Webb Space Telescope, which should be able to determine if the atmosphere is cloudy or clear by observing roughly 5 transits. Among a group of small and cool planets orbiting relatively bright M-dwarfs, its predicted secondary eclipse depth of 230 parts-per-million is second only to Gliese 1214 b.

The K2-28 planetary system
Companion (in order from star)	Mass	Semimajor axis (AU)	Orbital period (days)	Eccentricity	Inclination (°)	Radius
K2-28b	7.18+5.92 −3.08 (estimate) M_{🜨}	0.0191+0.0037 −0.0029	2.2604455±0.0000010	0	87.1+0.90 −0.74	2.56+0.27 −0.26 R_{🜨}
