= Wolf 1061b =

Exoplanet orbiting Wolf 1061

Wolf 1061 b
Discovery
- Discovered by: University of New South Wales, Australia
- Discovery site: European Southern Observatory
- Discovery date: December 18, 2015
- Detection method: Radial Velocity

Orbital characteristics
- Semi-major axis: 0.035509 (± 7e-06) AU
- Eccentricity: 0
- Orbital period (sidereal): 4.8876 (± 0.0014) d
- Star: Wolf 1061

Physical characteristics
- Mean radius: ≥1.44 R_{🜨}
- Mass: ≥1.36 M_{🜨}

Wolf 1061 b is an exoplanet orbiting the red dwarf star Wolf 1061 in the constellation Ophiuchus, about 13.8 light years from Earth. It is the first planet in order from its host star in a triple planetary system, and has an orbital period of nearly 5 days. The planet orbits too close to its star for it to be in the habitable zone.
