= K2-21 =

Red dwarf star in the constellation Aquarius

Observation data Epoch J2000 Equinox J2000
- Constellation: Aquarius
- Right ascension: 22^{h} 41^{m} 12.88625^{s}
- Declination: −14° 29′ 20.3492″
- Apparent magnitude (V): 12.85

Characteristics
- Evolutionary stage: Main sequence
- Spectral type: M0.0±0.5V
- Apparent magnitude (B): 14.14±0.06
- Apparent magnitude (V): 12.85±0.02
- Apparent magnitude (G): 12.268±0.003
- Apparent magnitude (J): 10.251±0.021
- Apparent magnitude (H): 9.633±0.022
- Apparent magnitude (K): 9.417±0.020

Astrometry
Radial velocity (R_{v})	3.54±0.82 km/s
Proper motion (μ)	RA: 20.672 mas/yr Dec.: -78.914 mas/yr
Parallax (π)	11.9662±0.0150 mas
Distance	272.6 ± 0.3 ly (83.6 ± 0.1 pc)

Details
Mass	0.64±0.11 M_{☉}
Radius	0.60±0.10 R_{☉}
Luminosity (bolometric)	0.086±0.064 L_{☉}
Temperature	4043±375 K
Metallicity [Fe/H]	−0.11±0.13 dex
Age	>1 Gyr

Other designations
- K2-21, EPIC 206011691, TIC 240766850, 2MASS J22411288-1429202

Database references
SIMBAD	data
Exoplanet Archive	data

K2-21, also known as EPIC 206011691, is a red dwarf star located 273 light-years (84 parsecs) away in the constellation Aquarius. It hosts two known exoplanets, discovered in 2015 by the transit method as part of Kepler's K2 mission. Both planets have significantly lower densities than Earth, indicating that they are not rocky planets and are better described as mini-Neptunes. The inner planet, K2-21b, is less dense than the outer planet, K2-21c.

The K2-21 planetary system
Companion (in order from star)	Mass	Semimajor axis (AU)	Orbital period (days)	Eccentricity	Inclination	Radius
b	1.59+0.52 −0.44 M_{🜨}	0.0731+0.0057 −0.0067	9.3238+0.0002 −0.0001	—	88.54+0.49 −0.59°	1.93±0.07 R_{🜨}
c	3.88+1.22 −1.07 M_{🜨}	0.1026+0.0079 −0.0094	15.5017±0.0002	—	89.02+0.33 −0.41°	2.25±0.05 R_{🜨}
