= Wolf 1061d =

Exoplanet orbiting Wolf 1061

Wolf 1061 d
Discovery
- Discovered by: University of New South Wales, Australia
- Discovery site: European Southern Observatory
- Discovery date: December 18, 2015
- Detection method: Radial Velocity

Orbital characteristics
- Apastron: 0.7285 AU (108,980,000 km)
- Periastron: 0.2115 AU (31,640,000 km)
- Semi-major axis: 0.470 ^{+0.15}_{−0.17} AU
- Eccentricity: 0.55 ^{+0.08}_{−0.09}
- Orbital period (sidereal): 217.21 ^{+0.55}_{−0.52} d
- Star: Wolf 1061

Physical characteristics
- Mean radius: ~2.2 R_{🜨}
- Mass: ≥7.70 ^{+1.12}_{−1.06} M_{🜨}
- Temperature: 118 K (−155 °C; −247 °F)

Wolf 1061 d is an exoplanet orbiting the red dwarf star Wolf 1061 in the constellation Ophiuchus, about 13.8 light years from Earth. It is the third and furthest planet in order from its host star in a triple planetary system, and has an orbital period of about 218 days.

== Characteristics ==
=== Mass, radius, and temperature ===
Wolf 1061 d is a super-Earth, with a mass significantly greater than that of Earth, but less than the ice giants Uranus and Neptune. However, because it was found with the radial velocity method and does not transit, only the planet's minimum mass is known. Wolf 1061 d is at least 7.70 M_{🜨}, close to the upper limit of the super-Earth range. If the planet is rocky, it would have a radius around 1.7 R_{🜨}. For a more likely mixed composition of both rock and volatiles, Wolf 1061 d would be at least 2.2 R_{🜨}.

The planet is one of the coldest known super-Earths, with an equilibrium temperature calculated to be around 118 K (−155 °C; −247 °F). This is too cold for liquid water and would mean that the planet is entirely coated in ice, depending on its true composition. However, due to the planet's eccentric orbit, the temperature varies wildly from as high as 176 K (−97 °C; −143 °F) to a low of 95 K (−178.2 °C; −288.7 °F).

=== Orbit ===
The orbit of Wolf 1061 d is one of the longest observed for a super-Earth in orbit around a red dwarf, as well as very eccentric. The average distance between the planet and the star is 0.470 AU, the distance between the Earth and the Sun is 1 AU. This is comparable to Mercury's semi-major axis of 0.387 AU. Unlike Mercury, Wolf 1061 d takes 217.21 days to orbit its host star, compared to Mercury's orbital period of 88 days. It also has a much higher orbital eccentricity of 0.55, nearly twice as high as that of Mercury. Wolf 1061 d swings from as close as 0.2115 AU to as far as 0.7285 AU during the course of its year.

=== Host star ===
Wolf 1061 d orbits the star Wolf 1061, which is one of the nearest stars to Earth at a distance of just under 14 light years. It is 0.294 times the radius and about 0.307 times the mass of the Sun with a temperature of 3342 K and an unknown age. For comparison, the Sun has a temperature of 5778 K and an age of 4.5 billion years. Wolf 1061 is about 1% as luminous as the Sun.

== Habitability ==
Despite the low stellar flux, the presence of additional greenhouse gases like methane or even hydrogen gas might make Wolf 1061 d marginally habitable, due to the high probability of Wolf 1061 d being a mini-Neptune combined with questionable prospects of being habitable for Earth-like life in the conventional sense makes this exoplanet a poor candidate for being “potentially habitable”.

A re-analysis of the system in March 2017 showed that Wolf 1061 d is likely uninhabitable; it is too far from its star and more likely to be a mini-Neptune, with a minimum mass almost 8 times that of Earth. Even at its closest approach, Wolf 1061 d never enters the system's habitable zone.
