= Psi1 Draconis =

Star in the constellation Draco

ψ^{1} Draconis
- Location of ψ^{1} Draconis (circled in red)

Observation data Epoch J2000 Equinox ICRS
- Constellation: Draco
- ψ^{1} Dra A
- Right ascension: 17^{h} 41^{m} 56.35536^{s}
- Declination: +72° 08′ 55.8481″
- Apparent magnitude (V): 4.58
- ψ^{1} Dra B
- Right ascension: 17^{h} 41^{m} 58.10460^{s}
- Declination: +72° 09′ 24.8581″
- Apparent magnitude (V): 5.82

Characteristics

ψ^{1} Dra A
- Spectral type: F5IV-V
- U−B color index: +0.01
- B−V color index: +0.43

ψ^{1} Dra B
- Spectral type: F8V
- U−B color index: +0.04
- B−V color index: +0.525

Astrometry

ψ^{1} Dra A
Radial velocity (R_{v})	−13.30±0.2 km/s
Proper motion (μ)	RA: +25.32 mas/yr Dec.: −268.47 mas/yr
Parallax (π)	43.79±0.45 mas
Distance	74.5 ± 0.8 ly (22.8 ± 0.2 pc)

ψ^{1} Dra B
Radial velocity (R_{v})	−11.20±0.3 km/s
Proper motion (μ)	RA: +34.89 mas/yr Dec.: −275.94 mas/yr
Parallax (π)	43.36±0.51 mas
Distance	75.2 ± 0.9 ly (23.1 ± 0.3 pc)

Orbit
Primary	ψ^{1} Dra Aa
Name	ψ^{1} Dra Ab
Period (P)	6774+271 −167 d
Semi-major axis (a)	9.1+0.4 −0.3 AU
Eccentricity (e)	0.679+0.006 −0.004
Inclination (i)	31±1°
Periastron epoch (T)	2450388+169 −273
Argument of periastron (ω) (secondary)	32.6±0.7°
Semi-amplitude (K_{1}) (primary)	5.18+0.04 −0.03 km/s
Semi-amplitude (K_{2}) (secondary)	11.1±0.2 km/s

Details

ψ^{1} Dra A
Mass	1.38+0.15 −0.08 / 0.70±0.07 M_{☉}
Radius	1.2–1.3 R_{☉}
Surface gravity (log g)	3.90±0.11 cgs
Temperature	6,544±42 / 4,400±300 K
Metallicity [Fe/H]	−0.10±0.05 dex

ψ^{1} Dra B
Mass	1.19±0.07 M_{☉}
Radius	1.5 R_{☉}
Surface gravity (log g)	4.20±0.12 cgs
Temperature	6,212±75 K
Age	3.3±1.0 Gyr

Other designations
- Dziban, 31 Dra, ADS 10759 AB, Gliese 694.1
- ψ^{1} Dra A: BD+72°804, HD 162003, HIP 86614, HR 6636, SAO 8890
- ψ^{1} Dra B: BD+72°805, HD 162004, HIP 86620, HR 6637, SAO 8891

Database references
SIMBAD	ψ^{1} Dra AB
- ψ^{1} Dra A
- ψ^{1} Dra B
Exoplanet Archive	data

Psi^{1} Draconis (ψ^{1} Draconis, abbreviated Psi^{1} Dra, ψ^{1} Dra), also designated 31 Draconis, is a triple star system in the northern constellation of Draco. The system is fairly close, and is located about 75 light-years (23 parsecs) from the Sun, based on its parallax.

Psi^{1} Draconis was considered a binary star consisting of an F-type subgiant and an F-type main-sequence star, designated Psi^{1} Draconis A (officially named Dziban /ˈzaɪbən/, from the traditional name of the system) and Psi^{1} Draconis B, respectively. In 2015, Psi^{1} Draconis A was itself found to be a double-lined spectroscopic binary, making the system a triple. The companion to Psi^{1} Draconis A was designated Psi^{1} Draconis C by its discoverers.

Also in 2015, Psi^{1} Draconis B was discovered to be orbited by an exoplanet, designated Psi^{1} Draconis Bb.

== Nomenclature ==
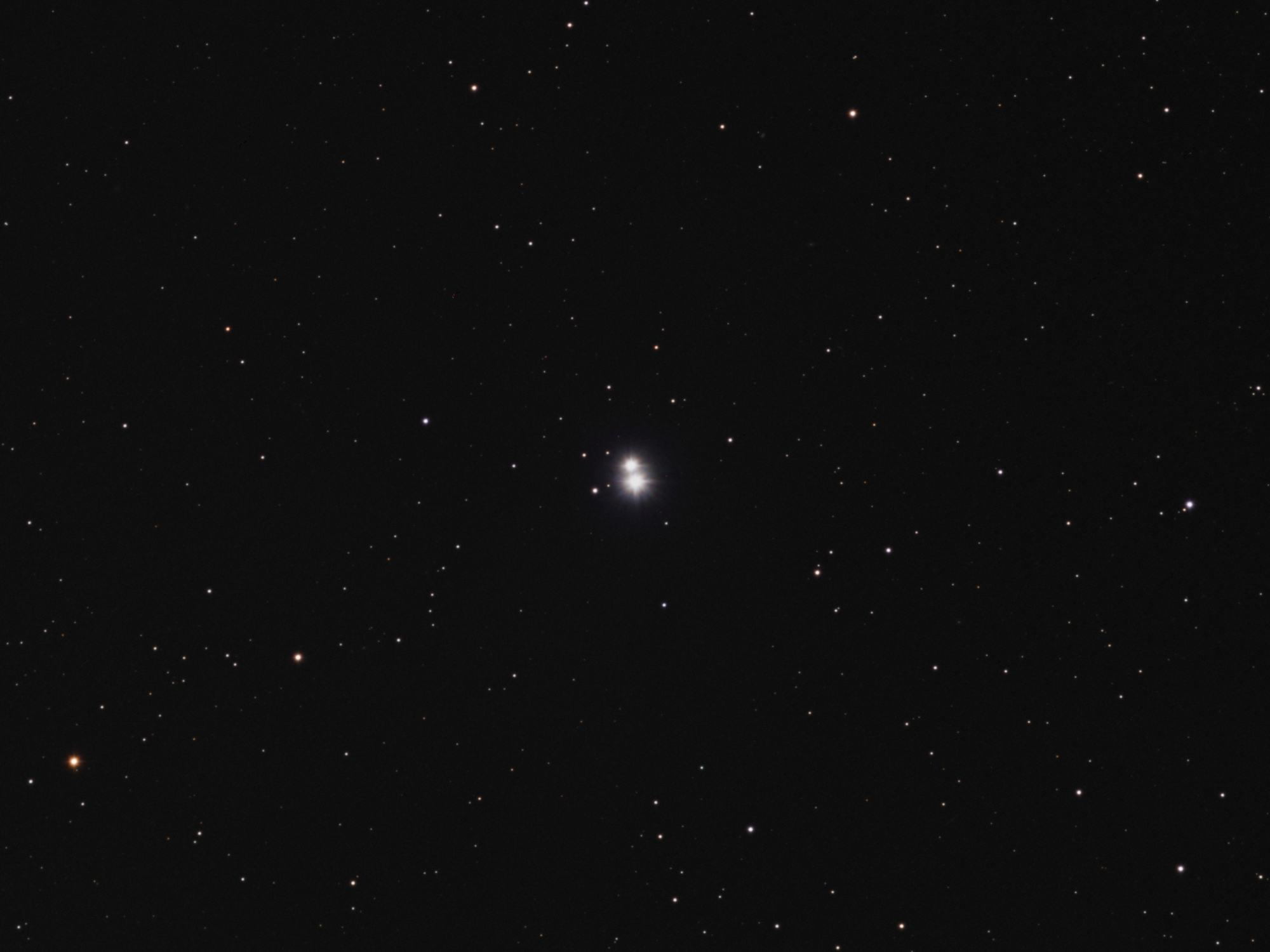
ψ^{1} Draconis in optical light

ψ^{1} Draconis (Latinised to Psi^{1} Draconis) is the system's Bayer designation and 31 Draconis its Flamsteed designation. The designation of the components – ψ^{1} Draconis A and B – derives from the convention used by the Washington Multiplicity Catalog (WMC) for multiple star systems, and adopted by the International Astronomical Union (IAU).

Psi^{1} Draconis bore the traditional name of Dziban or Dsiban, derived from the Arabic Adh-Dhi'ban, meaning "The two wolves" or "The two jackals". In 2016, the IAU organized a Working Group on Star Names (WGSN) to catalog and standardize proper names for stars. The WGSN decided to attribute proper names to individual stars rather than entire multiple systems. It approved the name Dziban for the component Psi^{1} Draconis A on 5 September 2017 and it is now so included in the List of IAU-approved Star Names.

In Chinese astronomy, Psi^{1} Draconis is called 女史, Pinyin: Nǚshǐ, meaning Female Protocol, because this star is marking itself and stands alone in the asterism Female Protocol in the Purple Forbidden enclosure (see Chinese constellation). 女史 (Nǚshǐ) has been Latinised into Niu She by R.H. Allen, meaning "the Palace Governess", or "a Literary Woman".

== Properties ==
ψ^{1} Draconis AC and ψ^{1} Draconis B are separated by about 31 arcseconds. Only a very small fraction of the orbit has been observed: an orbital period of 10,000 years has been calculated, but it is extremely preliminary and likely to be in high error.

ψ^{1} Draconis A and C have varying radial velocities in respect to Earth, indicating that there must be orbital motion. The orbital period is estimated to be around 20 years, and the eccentricity must be fairly high, around 0.679.

== Planetary system ==
Psi^{1} Draconis Bb is a Jupiter-like exoplanet orbiting Psi^{1} Draconis B, the secondary star. The planet was discovered when periodic Doppler shifts in the star's spectrum revealed the presence of a planet, similar to the spectroscopic binary nature of Psi^{1} Draconis AC. Its minimum mass is 1.53 M_{J}, and it orbits its host star every 8.5 years taking a relatively eccentric orbit.

The ψ^{1} Draconis B planetary system
Companion (in order from star)	Mass	Semimajor axis (AU)	Orbital period (days)	Eccentricity	Inclination (°)	Radius
b	≥1.53 ± 0.10 M_{J}	4.43 ± 0.04	3117 ± 42s	0.40 ± 0.05	—	—
