= HD 219134 c =

Super-Earth orbiting HD 219134

Discovery
- Discovery site: HARPS-N of the Telescopio Nazionale Galileo
- Discovery date: 2015 July 30
- Detection method: radial velocity method (HARPS-N);

Orbital characteristics
- Apastron: 0.06935±0.00588 AU
- Periastron: 0.06125±0.00588 AU
- Semi-major axis: 0.06530±0.0008 AU
- Eccentricity: 0.062±0.039
- Orbital period (sidereal): 6.76458±0.00033 days
- Inclination: 87.28±0.1
- Star: HD 219134

Physical characteristics
- Mean radius: 1.455±0.046 R_{🜨}
- Mass: 4.23±0.20M_{🜨}
- Mean density: 6.969+1.08 −0.933 g/cm^{3}
- Surface gravity: 1.91+0.23 −0.20 g
- Temperature: 782 K (509 °C; 948 °F)

HD 219134 c, also known as HR 8832 c, is a hot, dense, rocky exoplanet orbiting around the K-type star HD 219134 in the constellation of Cassiopeia. Originally thought to be a little less than three times the mass of Earth, it is now known to be over 4.2 times the mass and 45% larger in radius, suggesting a rocky composition with a higher quantity of iron than Earth. The exoplanet was initially detected by the instrument HARPS-N of the Italian Telescopio Nazionale Galileo via the radial velocity method. Transits of the planet were observed by the Spitzer Space Telescope in 2017. Later that year, it was predicted that HD 219134 c has an atmosphere.

== Characteristics ==
=== Mass, radius, and temperature ===
HD 219134 c is confirmed to be a rocky super-Earth, meaning that it has a solid surface but is significantly larger than Earth. The mass of the planet has been determined to be around 4.23 M_{🜨} with very low uncertainty. Its radius was found to be 1.455 R_{🜨} (9,300 km), once again with a small error margin. Despite being smaller in both mass and radius than its sister planet, HD 219134 c's density works out to be higher, at almost 7 g/cm^{3}, heavily implying a rock and iron based composition, similar to the terrestrial planets in the Solar System. However, it appears to have a somewhat higher fraction of iron than Earth. The planet's gravitational pull at its surface is around 1.91g, or over 90% greater than that of Earth.

Based on the planet's close proximity to the star, HD 219134 c is much hotter than Earth. It receives about 62 times the incident flux of Earth, and has an equilibrium temperature of 782 K (509 °C; 948 °F), hot enough to melt certain metals. Depending on the greenhouse effect and/or the amount of cloud cover in the planet's atmosphere, its actual temperature may be significantly higher or lower.

=== Orbit and rotation ===
HD 219134 c orbits its host star very closely, taking just 6.76 days to complete one full revolution at an orbital radius of 0.0653 AU. For comparison, the planet Mercury takes almost 88 days to orbit at a distance of 0.38 AU. Due to its close proximity to the star, the planet is likely a synchronous rotator, where one side of the planet always faces the parent star. HD 219134 c is near a 9:5 resonance with HD 219134 b and a 3:1 resonance with HD 219134 f.

=== Host star ===
The planet orbits a (K-type) star named HD 219134, orbited by a total of five to seven planets. The star has a mass of 0.81 M_{☉} and a radius of 0.778 R_{☉}. It has a temperature of 4699 K and is about 11.0 billion years old, making it one of the oldest stars. In comparison, the Sun is 4.6 billion years old and has a temperature of 5778 K.

The star's apparent magnitude, or how bright it appears from Earth's perspective, is 5. It can be seen with the naked eye.

=== Atmosphere ===
In 2017, it was predicted that HD 219134 c and HD 219134 b likely have atmospheres that are secondary in nature, based on the compositions of the planets and the potential for atmospheric escape. For HD 219134 c, the predicted atmosphere was calculated to reach a height of about 0.13 R_{🜨} (~830 km), below the predicted height of a primordial hydrogen atmosphere (0.19 R_{🜨}). This would indicate a secondary atmosphere produced by processes like volcanic activity and evaporation of volatile materials. However, the composition of volatile materials on HD 219134 b and c could not be accurately determined, yet it is believed that HD 219134 c lacks the amount of volatiles of its sister planet and has an atmosphere more similar to the terrestrial planets of the Solar System. This planet may have had liquid water when it formed but it is too close to its host star and thus would have experienced a runaway greenhouse effect and become a Venus-like world.
