= Wolf 1061c =

Exoplanet orbiting Wolf 1061

Wolf 1061 c
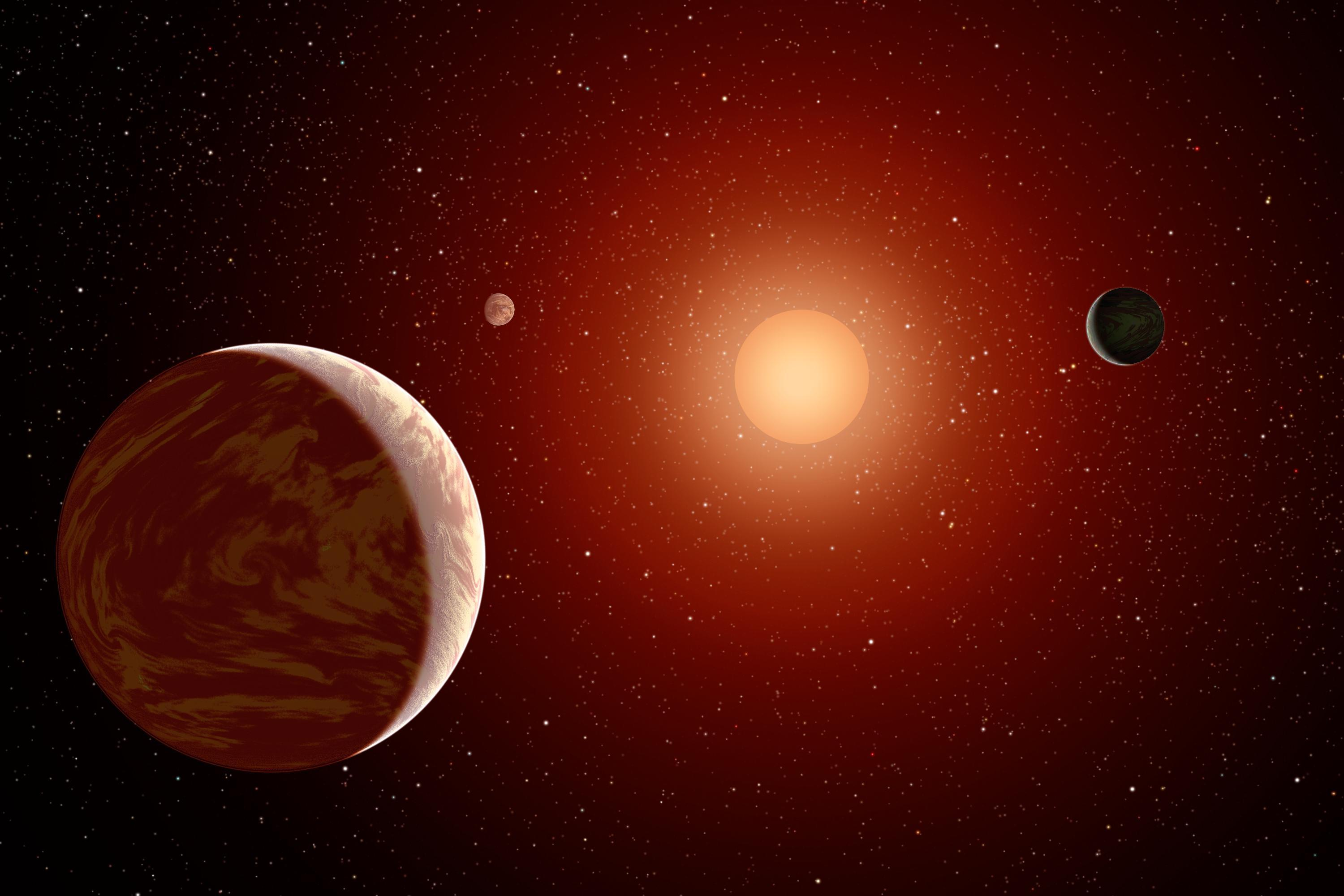
- Artist's impression of the planetary system around Wolf 1061.

Discovery
- Discovered by: University of New South Wales, Australia
- Discovery site: European Southern Observatory
- Discovery date: 17 December 2015
- Detection method: Radial velocity

Orbital characteristics
- Semi-major axis: 0.0890+0.0029 −0.0031 AU
- Eccentricity: 0.11+0.10 −0.07
- Orbital period (sidereal): 17.8719±0.0059 d
- Semi-amplitude: 1.92±0.19 m/s
- Star: Wolf 1061

Physical characteristics
- Mean radius: 1.66 R_{🜨}
- Mass: ≥3.41+0.43 −0.41 M_{🜨}
- Temperature: 223 K (−50 °C; −58 °F)

Wolf 1061 c is an exoplanet orbiting within the habitable zone of the red dwarf star Wolf 1061 in the constellation Ophiuchus, about 14.1 light-years from Earth. At the time of discovery, it was the closest known potentially habitable exoplanet to Earth, though several closer ones have since been found. It is the second planet in order from its host star in a triple planetary system, and has an orbital period of about 17.9 days. Wolf 1061 c is classified as a super-Earth as its mass is between that of Earth and Neptune.

== Characteristics ==
Wolf 1061 c is thought to be a super-Earth planet as its minimum mass is about 3.4 times that of Earth. Its radius is unknown, but predicted to be about 1.6 times that of Earth. The planet has an equilibrium temperature of 223 K (−50 °C; −58 °F), slightly higher than that of Mars.

In astronomical terms, the Wolf 1061 system is relatively close to Earth, at only 14.1 light years away.

The discovery was announced on 17 December 2015, following a study that used 10 years of archival spectra of the star Wolf 1061 using the HARPS spectrograph attached to the ESO 3.6 m Telescope at the European Southern Observatory at La Silla, Chile.

=== Host star ===
The planet orbits a star named Wolf 1061, which is orbited by a total of three planets. The star has a mass of 0.25 M_{☉} and a radius of 0.26 R_{☉}. It has a temperature of 3380 K. The age is poorly constrained and unknown, but estimates would place it around a few billion years. In comparison, the Sun is 4.6 billion years old and has a surface temperature of 5778 K.

The star's apparent magnitude, or how bright it appears from Earth's perspective, is 10.1^{m}. Therefore, it is too dim to be seen with the naked eye.

== Orbit ==
Wolf 1061 c orbits its host star with less than 1% of the Sun's luminosity every 17.9 days at a distance of 0.09 astronomical units (AU) (compared to Mercury which orbits at a distance of 0.38 AU).

The planet's orbital distance of 0.084 AU (assuming mild eccentricity) lies at the inner edge of its star's habitable zone, which extends from approximately 0.073 to 0.190 AU (for comparison, the habitable zone of the Sun is approximated at 0.5 to 3.0 AU for its different energy emission). Its host star is a red dwarf, with about a quarter as much mass as the Sun. As a result, stars like Wolf 1061 have the ability to burn up to 400–500 billion years, 40–50 times longer than the Sun will.

Because it is so close to the star, it is likely to be tidally locked, meaning one side permanently faces the star and the other side permanently faces away. Although this scenario could result in extreme temperature differences on the planet, the terminator line that separates the illuminated side and the dark side could potentially be habitable. Additionally, a much larger portion of the planet could also be habitable if it has a thick enough atmosphere to facilitate heat transfer away from the side facing the star.

A 2017 study concluded that it is unlikely that the planets within the system, including Wolf 1061 c, have any surface water, hypothesizing that it is a runaway greenhouse candidate as they lie within the Venus zone of Wolf 1061.

== See also ==
- List of exoplanets
- List of potentially habitable exoplanets
