= Rho Draconis =

Star in the constellation Draco

- Location of ρ Draconis (circled in red)

Observation data Epoch J2000.0 Equinox J2000.0 (ICRS)
- Constellation: Draco
- Right ascension: 20^{h} 02^{m} 49.07085^{s}
- Declination: +67° 52′ 24.8308″
- Apparent magnitude (V): 4.52

Characteristics
- Evolutionary stage: red giant branch
- Spectral type: K3 III
- U−B color index: +1.54
- B−V color index: +1.34

Astrometry
Radial velocity (R_{v})	−9.80±0.43 km/s
Proper motion (μ)	RA: +15,824 mas/yr Dec.: +47.749 mas/yr
Parallax (π)	7.5052±0.0993 mas
Distance	435 ± 6 ly (133 ± 2 pc)
Absolute magnitude (M_{V})	−0.97

Details
Radius	28 R_{☉}
Luminosity	402 L_{☉}
Surface gravity (log g)	1.90 cgs
Temperature	4370 K
Metallicity [Fe/H]	0.03 dex
Rotational velocity (v sin i)	10 km/s

Other designations
- ρ Dra, 67 Dra, BD+67°1222, HD 190940, HIP 98702, HR 7685, SAO 18676

Database references
SIMBAD	data

Rho Draconis (ρ Draconis) is a solitary star in the northern circumpolar constellation of Draco. It is faintly visible to the naked eye with an apparent visual magnitude of 4.52. Based upon an annual parallax shift of 7.5 mas as measured from Earth, it is located around 435 light years from the Sun. At that distance, the visual magnitude of the star is diminished by an extinction factor of 0.027 due to interstellar dust.

With a stellar classification of K3 III, Rho Draconis is a normal giant star that is past the first dredge-up phase of its post-main sequence evolution. It has the peculiar spectrum of a CN star, showing abnormal line strengths for cyanogen and calcium. The star has expanded to around 28 times the Sun's radius and it is radiating 402 times the solar luminosity from its photosphere at an effective temperature of 4,370 K.
