= 64 Draconis =

Star in the constellation Draco

- Location of 64 Draconis (circled)

Observation data Epoch J2000 Equinox ICRS
- Constellation: Draco
- Right ascension: 20^{h} 01^{m} 28.65587^{s}
- Declination: +64° 49′ 15.5038″
- Apparent magnitude (V): 5.27

Characteristics
- Evolutionary stage: AGB
- Spectral type: M1 III
- B−V color index: 1.598±0.006

Astrometry
Radial velocity (R_{v})	−36.12±0.13 km/s
Proper motion (μ)	RA: −24.818 mas/yr Dec.: +33.623 mas/yr
Parallax (π)	7.2102±0.1296 mas
Distance	452 ± 8 ly (139 ± 2 pc)
Absolute magnitude (M_{V})	−1.05

Details
Mass	1.36 M_{☉}
Radius	68 R_{☉}
Luminosity	967 L_{☉}
Surface gravity (log g)	1.16 cgs
Temperature	4,134 K
Metallicity [Fe/H]	−0.89 dex
Age	5.4 Gyr

Other designations
- e Draconis, 64 Dra, BD+64°1405, FK5 3604, HD 190544, HIP 98583, HR 7676, SAO 18658

Database references
SIMBAD	data

64 Draconis is a single star in the northern circumpolar constellation of Draco, located 452 light years away. It has the Bayer designation of e Draconis; 64 Draconis is the Flamsteed designation. The object is visible to the naked eye as a dim, red-hued star with an apparent visual magnitude of 5.27. It is moving closer to the Earth with a heliocentric radial velocity of −36 km/s, and it is predicted to come as close as 204 ly in around 4.3 million years.

This is an evolved red giant star with a stellar classification of M1 III, currently on the asymptotic giant branch. It has expanded to about 68 times the Sun's radius and is radiating 967 times the Sun's luminosity from its photosphere at an effective temperature of 4,134 K. 64 Draconis forms a faint naked-eye pair with 65 Draconis 12′ away. The latter is a suspected variable with a brightness range in the Hipparcos photometric filter of 5.29 to 5.33.

In Chinese astronomy, it belongs to the 天廚 (Tiān Chú) (Celestial Kitchen) asterism.
