= Pi Draconis =

Star in the constellation Draco

- Location of π Draconis (circled in red)

Observation data Epoch J2000 Equinox J2000
- Constellation: Draco
- Right ascension: 19^{h} 20^{m} 40.09333^{s}
- Declination: +65° 42′ 52.3095″
- Apparent magnitude (V): 4.59

Characteristics
- Spectral type: A2 IIIs
- U−B color index: +0.06
- B−V color index: +0.02

Astrometry
Radial velocity (R_{v})	−28.1±1.1 km/s
Proper motion (μ)	RA: +15.09 mas/yr Dec.: +41.12 mas/yr
Parallax (π)	14.25±0.12 mas
Distance	229 ± 2 ly (70.2 ± 0.6 pc)
Absolute magnitude (M_{V})	+0.37

Details
Mass	2.70 M_{☉}
Radius	3.2 R_{☉}
Luminosity	60 L_{☉}
Surface gravity (log g)	3.80 cgs
Temperature	9,125 K
Metallicity [Fe/H]	0.42 dex
Rotational velocity (v sin i)	26±1 km/s
Age	350 Myr

Other designations
- π Dra, 58 Dra, BD+65°1345, FK5 3547, HD 182564, HIP 95081, HR 7371, SAO 18299

Database references
SIMBAD	data

Pi Draconis, Latinized from π Draconis, is a solitary star in the northern circumpolar constellation of Draco. It is visible to the naked eye with an apparent visual magnitude of 4.59. Based upon an annual parallax shift of 14.25 mas as measured from Earth, it is located around 229 light years from the Sun. At that distance, the visual magnitude is diminished by an extinction factor of 0.063±0.10 due to interstellar dust.

With an age of 350 million years, this is an A-type star of stellar classification A2 IIIs, where the luminosity class of III typically indicates an evolved giant star and the 's' means the spectrum displays sharp absorption lines. It is a candidate Am star, meaning there are some chemical peculiarities. The measured angular size is 0.427±0.062 arc seconds. At the estimated distance of Pi Draconis, this yields a physical size of about 3.2 times the radius of the Sun. It has about 2.70 times the mass of the Sun and is radiating 60 times the solar luminosity from its photosphere at an effective temperature of 9,125 K.
