= HD 219134 b =

Super-Earth orbiting HD 219134

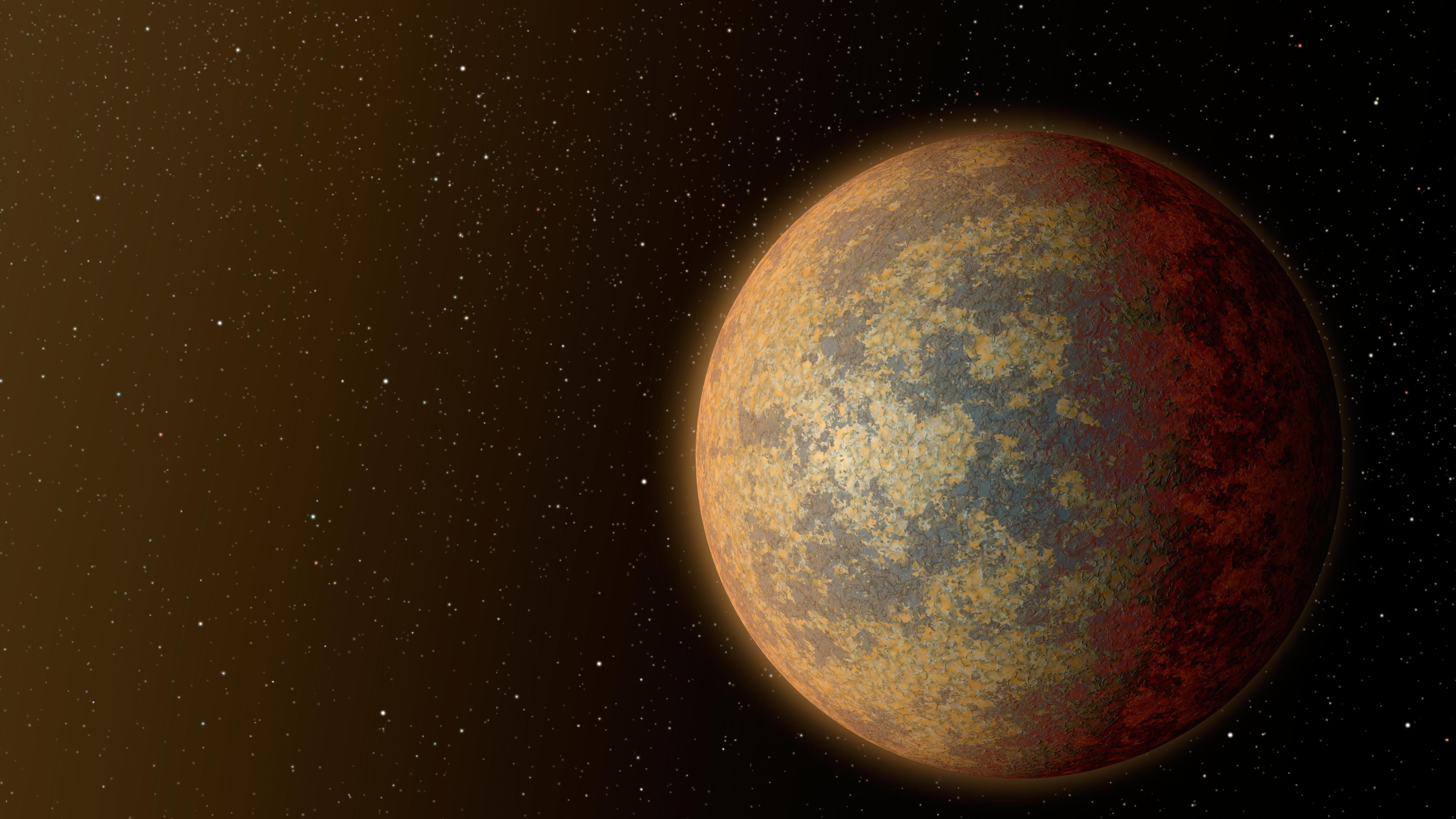
- An artist's impression of the hot rocky exoplanet HD 219134 b.

Discovery
- Discovery site: HARPS-N of the Telescopio Nazionale Galileo
- Discovery date: 30 July 2015
- Detection method: radial velocity method (HARPS-N)

Orbital characteristics
- Semi-major axis: 0.038764±0.0047 AU
- Eccentricity: 0 (fixed)
- Orbital period (sidereal): 3.092926±0.0004 days
- Inclination: 85.058±0.080
- Star: HD 219134

Physical characteristics
- Mean radius: 1.542±0.054 R_{🜨}
- Mass: 4.59±0.16 M_{🜨}
- Mean density: 6.36±0.72 g cm^{−3}
- Surface gravity: 1.847+0.213 −0.19 g
- Temperature: 1,015 K (742 °C; 1,367 °F)

HD 219134 b (or HR 8832 b) is one of at least five exoplanets orbiting HD 219134, a main-sequence star in the constellation of Cassiopeia. HD 219134 b has a size of about 1.5 R_{🜨}, and a density of 6.4 g/cm^{3} and orbits at 21.25 light-years away. The exoplanet was initially detected by the instrument HARPS-N of the Italian Telescopio Nazionale Galileo via the radial velocity method and subsequently observed by the Spitzer telescope as transiting in front of its star. The exoplanet has a mass of about 4.5 times that of Earth and orbits its host star every three days. In 2017, it was found that the planet likely hosts an atmosphere.

== Characteristics ==
=== Mass, radius and temperature ===
HD 219134 b is a super-Earth, an exoplanet with a radius and mass bigger than Earth, but smaller than that of the ice giants Neptune and Uranus. Using both the radial velocity and transit method, both its mass and radius have been well determined, allowing for accurate modelling of the planet's composition. HD 219134 b has a radius of 1.542 R_{🜨} and a mass of 4.59 M_{🜨}, giving it a density of about 6.4 g/cm^{3} and 1.85 times the gravity of Earth. This is consistent with a rocky, Earth-like composition. This is relatively unusual, as most planets of ≥1.6 R_{🜨} are expected to be rich in volatile materials, such as water and gas. Despite its Earth-like composition, the planet's equilibrium temperature is around 1,015 K (742 °C; 1,367 °F), far too hot for liquid water or life. Depending on the amount of cloud cover in the atmosphere of HD 219134 b, the actual temperature may be somewhat lower, but nowhere near the range for liquid water. In addition, its geology is presumed should be rich in calcium and aluminium.

Zooming in on the exoplanet HD 219134 b (00:53; animation; 30 July 2015).

=== Host star ===
The planet orbits a (K-type) star named HD 219134, orbited by a total of five to seven planets. The star has a mass of 0.81 M_{☉} and a radius of 0.778 R_{☉}. It has a temperature of 4699 K and is about 11.0 billion years old, making it one of the oldest stars. In comparison, the Sun is 4.6 billion years old and has a temperature of 5778 K.

The star's apparent magnitude, or how bright it appears from Earth's perspective, is 5.574. It can be seen with the naked eye.

=== Orbit ===
HD 219134 b orbits its host star with about 28% of the Sun's luminosity with an orbital period of 3 days and an orbital radius of about 0.03 times that of Earth's (compared to the distance of Mercury from the Sun, which is about 0.38 AU).

=== Atmosphere ===
In 2017, it was predicted that HD 219134 b and HD 219134 c likely have atmospheres that are secondary in nature, based on the compositions of the planets and the potential for atmospheric escape. For HD 219134 b, the predicted atmosphere was calculated to reach a height of about 0.18 R_{🜨} (~1,150 km), below the predicted height of a primordial hydrogen atmosphere (0.28 R_{🜨}). This would indicate a secondary atmosphere produced by processes like volcanic activity and evaporation of volatile materials. However, the composition of volatile materials on HD 219134 b and c could not be accurately determined, yet it is believed that the former has a very thin gaseous envelope, far thinner than those of Uranus and Neptune.

== See also ==
- List of exoplanet extremes
- Other rocky planets with confirmed atmospheres:
  - Gliese 1132 b, has an atmosphere rich in water and methane, though this has since been rendered doubtful.
  - Janssen, has an atmosphere with hydrogen, helium, hydrogen cyanide, nitrogen, and/or carbon monoxide.
