= HARPS-N =

High-precision radial-velocity spectrograph

HARPS-N, the High Accuracy Radial velocity Planet Searcher for the Northern hemisphere is a high-precision radial-velocity spectrograph, installed at the Italian Telescopio Nazionale Galileo, a 3.58-metre telescope located at the Roque de los Muchachos Observatory on the island of La Palma, Canary Islands, Spain.

HARPS-N is the counterpart for the Northern Hemisphere of the similar HARPS instrument installed on the ESO 3.6 m Telescope at La Silla Observatory in Chile. It allows for planetary research in the northern sky which hosts the constellations Cygnus and Lyra. In particular it allows for detailed follow up research to Kepler mission planet candidates, which are located in the Cygnus region.

The instrument's main scientific goals are the discovery and characterization of terrestrial super-Earths by combining the measurements using transit photometry and doppler spectroscopy which provide both, the size and mass of the exoplanet. Based on the resulting density, rocky (terrestrial) Super-Earths can be distinguished from gaseous exoplanets.

The HARPS-N Project is a collaboration between the Geneva Observatory (lead), the Center for Astrophysics in Cambridge (Massachusetts), the Universities of St. Andrews and Edinburgh, the Queen's University Belfast, the UK Astronomy Technology Centre and the Italian Istituto Nazionale di Astrofisica.

== First light on sky ==
First light on sky was obtained by HARPS-N on March 27, 2012, and official operations started on August 1, 2012.

== See also ==
- ESPRESSO
- Euler Telescope
- Geneva Extrasolar Planet Search
- Next-Generation Transit Survey
- SuperWASP
