= K-type main-sequence star =

Stellar classification

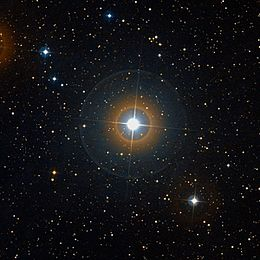
- Sigma Draconis, officially named Alsafi, is a K-type main-sequence star.

Characteristics
- Type: Class of medium-small main sequence star
- Mass range: 0.60–0.86 M_{☉}
- Temperature: 3,930–5,290 K
- Average luminosity: 0.079–0.47 L_{☉}

External links
- Media category
- Q863936

A K-type main-sequence star (Note: also called a "K-type dwarf" or "orange dwarf") is a main-sequence (core hydrogen-burning) star of spectral type K. The spectral luminosity class is V. These stars are intermediate in size between red dwarfs and yellow dwarfs, hence the term orange dwarfs often applied to this type.

== Description ==
K-type main-sequence stars have masses between 0.6 and 0.9 times the mass of the Sun and surface temperatures between 3,900 and 5,300 K. These stars are of particular interest in the search for extraterrestrial life due to their stability and long lifespan. These stars stay on the main sequence for up to 70 billion years, a length of time much larger than the time the universe has existed (13.8 billion years); as such, none have had sufficient time to leave the main sequence. Well-known examples include Alpha Centauri B (K1 V), Epsilon Indi (K5 V) and Epsilon Eridani (K2 V).

== Subdwarfs ==
There are subdwarf stars, that is stars of luminosity class VI, of spectral class K. These stars are fusing hydrogen in their cores like normal main-sequence stars, but due to their low metallicity they lie about two magnitudes below the main sequence (ie. less luminous).

== Nomenclature ==
In modern usage, the names applied to K-type main sequence stars vary. When explicitly defined, late K dwarfs are typically grouped with early to mid-M-class stars as red dwarfs, but in other cases red dwarf is restricted just to M-class stars. In some cases all K stars are included as red dwarfs, and occasionally even earlier stars. The term orange dwarf is often applied to early-K stars, but in some cases it is used for all K-type main sequence stars.

== Spectral standard stars ==
Properties of typical K-type main-sequence stars
Spectral type	Mass (M_{☉})	Radius (R_{☉})	Luminosity (L_{☉})	Effective temperature (K)	Color index (B − V)
K0V	0.86	0.813	0.47	5,290	0.82
K1V	0.85	0.797	0.40	5,170	0.86
K2V	0.82	0.783	0.37	5,100	0.88
K3V	0.76	0.755	0.27	4,870	0.99
K4V	0.72	0.710	0.20	4,600	1.09
K5V	0.70	0.701	0.17	4,440	1.15
K6V	0.67	0.669	0.14	4,300	1.24
K7V	0.64	0.630	0.10	4,090	1.34
K8V	0.61	0.615	0.086	3,990	1.36
K9V	0.60	0.608	0.079	3,930	1.40

The revised Yerkes Atlas system (Johnson & Morgan 1953) listed 12 K-type dwarf spectral standard stars, however not all of these have survived to this day as standards. The "anchor points" of the MK classification system among the K-type main-sequence dwarf stars, i.e. those standard stars that have remained unchanged over the years, are:

- Sigma Draconis (K0 V)
- Epsilon Eridani (K2 V)
- 61 Cygni A (K5 V)

Other primary MK standard stars include:

- 70 Ophiuchi A (K0 V),
- 107 Piscium (K1 V)
- HD 219134 (K3 V)
- TW Piscis Austrini (K4 V)
- HD 120467 (K6 V)
- 61 Cygni B (K7 V)

Based on the example set in some references (e.g. Johnson & Morgan 1953, Keenan & McNeil 1989), many authors consider the step between K7 V and M0 V to be a single subdivision, and the K8 and K9 classifications are rarely seen. A few examples such as HIP 111288 (K8V) and HIP 3261 (K9V) have been defined and used.

== Planets ==
These stars are of particular interest in the search for extraterrestrial life because they are stable on the main sequence for a very long time (17–70 billion years, compared to 10 billion for the Sun). Like M-type stars, they tend to have a very small mass, leading to their extremely long lifespan that offers plenty of time for life to develop on orbiting planets.

Some of the nearest K-type stars known to have planets include Epsilon Eridani, HD 192310, Gliese 86, and 54 Piscium.

K-type main-sequence stars are about three to four times as abundant as G-type main-sequence stars, making planet searches easier. K-type stars emit less total ultraviolet and other ionizing radiation than G-type stars like the Sun (which can damage DNA and thus hamper the emergence of nucleic acid based life). In fact, many peak in the red.

While M-type stars are the most abundant, they are more likely to have tidally locked planets in habitable-zone orbits and are more prone to producing solar flares and cold spots that would more easily strike nearby rocky planets, potentially making it much harder for life to develop. Due to their greater heat, the habitable zones of K-type stars are also much wider than those of M-type stars. For all of these reasons, they may be the most favorable stars to focus on in the search for exoplanets and extraterrestrial life.

=== Radiation hazard ===
61 Cygni, a binary K-type star system

Despite K-stars' lower total UV output, in order for their planets to have habitable temperatures, they must orbit much nearer to their K-star hosts, offsetting or reversing any advantage of a lower total UV output. There is also growing evidence that K-type dwarf stars emit dangerously high levels of X-rays and far ultraviolet (FUV) radiation for considerably longer into their early main sequence phase than do either heavier G-type stars or lighter early M-type dwarf stars. This prolonged radiation saturation period may sterilise, destroy the atmospheres of, or at least delay the emergence of life for Earth-like planets orbiting inside the habitable zones around K-type dwarf stars.

== See also ==
- G-type main-sequence star
- Solar analog
- Star count, survey of stars
