= List of exoplanets discovered in 2019 =

This list of exoplanets discovered in 2019 is a list of confirmed exoplanets that were first observed during 2019.

For exoplanets detected only by radial velocity, the listed value for mass is a lower limit. See Minimum mass for more information.

Name	Mass (M_{J})	Radius (R_{J})	Period (days)	Semi-major axis (AU)	Temp. (K)	Discovery method	Distance (ly)	Host star mass (M_{☉})	Host star temp. (K)	Remarks
7 Canis Majoris c	0.87		996.00	2.153		radial vel.	64.6	1.34	4826	
Beta Pictoris c	9		1200	2.7		radial vel.	64.43	1.76		
DS Tucanae Ab		0.509±0.015	8.138268±0.000011		850	transit	143.89±0.22	1.01±0.06	5428±80	
Epsilon Indi Ab	3.25		16510	11.55	64.25	radial vel.	11.87	0.75		
G 9-40 b		0.1807	5.746007	0.0385	456	transit	91.1	0.290	3348	
Gliese 49 b	0.0177^{+0.0021}_{−0.0021}		13.8508^{+0.0053}_{−0.0051}	0.0905±0.0011		radial vel.	32.145±0.01	0.515±0.019	3805±51	
Gliese 357 b	0.00579	0.1086	3.93072	0.035	525	transit	30.80	0.342	3505	
Gliese 357 c	0.0107		9.1247	0.061	401.2	radial vel.	30.80	0.342	3505	
Gliese 357 d	0.019		55.661	0.204	219.6	radial vel.	30.80	0.342	3505	Potentially habitable exoplanet
Gliese 378 b	0.04097±0.006		3.822±0.001	0.082±0.002		radial vel.	48.79	0.56±0.01	3879±67	
Gliese 411 b	0.00941±0.00145		12.9532±0.0079		349.83±0.32	radial vel.	8.284	0.386±0.039	3563±60	Host star also known as Lalande 21185
Gliese 685 b	0.028^{+0.0053}_{−0.0057}		24.160^{+0.061}_{−0.047}	0.1344^{+0.0052}_{−0.0051}		radial vel.	46.7102	0.3816±0.069	0.55±0.06	
Gliese 686 b	0.022±0.003		15.53209^{+0.00166}_{−0.00167}	0.091±0.004	379^{+24}_{−25}	radial vel.	26.612±0.008	0.42±0.05	3663±68	
Gliese 3512 b	0.463		203.59	0.3380		radial vel.	30.95	0.123	3081	
Gliese 4276 b	0.05213^{+0.00296}_{−0.00299}		13.352±0.003	0.082±0.002		radial vel.	69.6±0.1	0.41±0.03	3387±51	May be two planwts in 2:1 orbital resonance
HAT-P-69b	3.58	1.676	4.7869491	0.06555	1930	transit	1122	1.65	7394	
HAT-P-70b	<6.78	1.87	2.74432452	0.04739	4000	transit	1073	1.89	8450	
HD 8326 b	0.210±0.062		158.991±1.440	0.533±0.011		radial vel.	100.2	0.80±0.05	4914^{+51}_{−32}	
HD 13724 b	26.77^{+4.40}_{−2.20}		14763.405^{+4901.655}_{−1599.795}	12.40^{+2.60}_{−0.90}		radial vel.	141.9±0.17	0.76±0.71	5868±27	
HD 15337 b	0.0236^{+0.0034}_{−0.0032}	0.146±0.005	4.75615±0.00017	0.0522±0.0012	1001.0±11.5	transit	146.36±0.23	0.90±0.03	5125±50	Host star also known as TOI-402
HD 15337 c	0.0255^{+0.0057}_{−0.0053}	0.213±0.011	17.1784±0.0016	0.1268±0.0038	642±10	transit	146.36±0.23	0.90±0.03	5125±50	Host star also known as TOI-402
HD 21411 b	0.207±0.081		84.288±0.127	0.362±0.007		radial vel.	±95.11	0.89±0.05	5605^{+247}_{−132}	
HD 21749 b	0.073^{+0.007}_{−0.006}	0.254^{+0.023}_{−0.020}	35.61253^{+0.00060}_{−0.00062}	0.1915^{+0.0058}_{−0.0063}	422^{+15}_{−14}	transit	53.261±0.023	0.73±0.07	4640±100	
HD 21749 c	<0.0116	0.0796^{+0.0057}_{−0.0052}	7.78993^{+0.00051}_{−0.00044}	0.0695^{+0.0021}_{−0.0023}	701^{+25}_{−23}	transit	53.261±0.023	0.73±0.07	4640±100	
HD 24085 b	0.0371±0.0098		2.0455±0.0002	0.034±0.001		radial vel.	179.4	1.22±0.07	6034^{+32}_{−53}	
HD 25015 b	4.48^{+0.30}_{−0.28}		6019.320^{+679.365}_{−262.980}	6.19^{+0.45}_{−0.23}		radial vel.	122.2±0.22	0.86±0.05	5160±63	
HD 39855 b	0.027±0.005		3.2498±0.0004	0.041±0.001		radial vel.	75.93	0.87±0.05	5576^{+50}_{−46}	
HD 64114 b	0.0560±0.0110		45.791±0.070	0.246±0.005		radial vel.	102.9	0.95±0.05	5676^{+32}_{−87}	
HD 65216c	1.295±0.062		577.6±1.328	1.301±0.020		radial vel.	114.7±0.1	0.95±0.01	5718±8	Rediscovered in 2019 after false positive in 2013
HD 85628 Ab	1.675±0.241	1.515±0.044	2.8240932±0.0000046	0.0474±0.0013	1865±25	transit	560±3	1.75±0.05	7800±200	Host star also known as MASCARA-4
HD 92788 c	3.67^{+0.30}_{−0.25}		11611.2975^{+5055.06}_{−905.820}	10.50^{+2.90}_{−0.55}		radial vel.	113.1385	1.15±0.07	5744±24	
HD 92987 b	16.88^{+0.69}_{−0.65}		10354.8375^{+551.5275}_{−270.2850}	9.62^{+0.36}_{−0.26}		radial vel.	142.2±0.22	1.08±0.06	5770±36	
HD 97048 b	2.5			130		imaging	603	2.4	10000	Discovered using study of disk kinematics.
HD 102843 b	0.3584±0.0456		3090.942±295.049	4.074±0.270		radial vel.	205.05	0.95±0.05	5436^{+144}_{−69}	
HD 103949 b	0.0352±0.0072		120.878±0.446	0.439±0.009		radial vel.	86.50	0.77±0.04	4792^{+66}_{−54}	
HD 181234 b	8.37^{+0.34}_{−0.36}		7462.0575^{+80.3550}_{−76.7025}	12.40^{+2.60}_{−0.90}		radial vel.	155.9±0.42	1.01±0.06	5386±60	
HD 202696 b	1.996^{+0.220}_{−0.100}		517.8^{+8.9}_{−3.9}	1.566^{+0.016}_{−0.007}		radial vel.	618.3±5.2	1.91^{+0.09}_{−0.14}	5040^{+71}_{−85}	
HD 202696 c	1.864^{+0.177}_{−0.227}		946.6^{+20.7}_{−20.9}	2.342^{+0.034}_{−0.035}		radial vel.	618.3±5.2	1.91^{+0.09}_{−0.14}	5040^{+71}_{−85}	
HD 206255 b	0.108±0.022		96.045±0.317	0.461±0.009		radial vel.	245.9	1.42±0.08	5635^{+82}_{−99}	
HD 210193 b	0.4817±0.0733		649.918±8.599	1.487±0.031		radial vel.	137.8	1.04±0.06	5790^{+38}_{−50}	
HD 211970 b	0.0409±0.0079		25.201±0.025	0.143±0.003		radial vel.	42.4	0.61±0.04	4127^{+149}_{−94}	
HD 213885 b	0.0278^{+0.0021}_{−0.0020}	0.1557^{+0.0045}_{−0.0046}	1.008035^{+0.000021}_{−0.000020}	0.02012^{+0.00015}_{−0.00012}		transit	156.45721±0.4566189	1.068^{+0.020}_{−0.018}	5978±50	A transiting 1-day-period super-Earth with an Earth-like composition around a bright (V=7.9) star unveiled by TESS
HD 213885 c	0.06277^{+0.00434}_{−0.00428}		4.78503^{+0.00056}_{−0.000051}	0.056798^{+0.00044}_{−0.00032}	1265.4^{+7.3}_{−8.4}	radial vel.	156.45721±0.4566189	1.068^{+0.020}_{−0.018}	5978±50	
HD 221416 b	0.190±0.018	0.836^{+0.031}_{−0.028}	14.2767±0.0037	0.1228^{+0.00025}_{−0.00026}		transit	310.0931	1.212±0.074	5080±90	Host star also known as TOI-197 or HIP 116158
HD 221420 b	9.70^{+1.10}_{−1.00}		22482^{+4200}_{−4100}	18.5±2.3		radial vel.	101.7±0.12	1.67±0.11	5830±44	
HIP 35173 b	0.0400±0.0085		41.516±0.077	0.217±0.004		radial vel.	108.25	0.79±0.05	4881^{+55}_{−81}	
HIP 54373 b	0.02712±0.00579		7.760±0.003	0.063±0.001		radial vel.	61.09	0.57±0.03	4021^{+226}_{−146}	
HIP 54373 c	0.03914±0.00664		15.144±0.008	0.0990±0.0020		radial vel.	61.09	0.57±0.03	4021^{+226}_{−146}	
HIP 71135 b	0.0592±0.0129		87.190±0.381	0.335±0.007		radial vel.	105.5	0.66±0.04	4146^{+107}_{−110}	
HIP 79098 (AB)b	20.5±4.5			345±6	2450±150	imaging	477.2±8.2	3.75±1.25		Brown dwarf
HR 858 b		0.1860^{+0.0061}_{−0.0057}	3.58599±0.00015	0.0480^{+0.0010}_{−0.0011}	1572^{+22}_{−19}	transit	104.35	1.145^{+0.074}_{−0.080}	6201±50	
HR 858 c		0.1730±0.0062	5.97293^{+0.00060}_{−0.00053}	0.0674^{+0.0014}_{−0.0016}	1326^{+18}_{−16}	transit	104.35	1.145^{+0.074}_{−0.080}	6201±50	
HR 858 d		0.1931^{+0.0077}_{−0.0074}	11.2300^{+0.0011}_{−0.0010}	0.1027^{+0.0022}_{−0.0025}	1075^{+15}_{−13}	transit	104.35	1.145^{+0.074}_{−0.080}	6201±50	
HR 5183 b	3.23		27000	18	171	radial vel.	102.7	1.07	5794	Exoplanet found with one of the most elliptical orbits as of 2019
K2-32e		0.0901^{+0.0089}_{−0.008}	4.34882^{+0.00069}_{−0.00075}	0.04951±0.00055		transit	516.6±4.2	0.856±0.028		With a radius almost identical to that of the Earth it is almost certainly a terrestrial planet
K2-43c		0.216	2.198884		1093.7	transit	598	0.57	3841	
K2-50c		0.089^{+0.011}_{−0.01}	3.96151^{+0.00046}_{−0.00051}			transit	845.82±10.63	0.61±0.06		
K2-63c		0.35±0.11	25.4556±0.0047	0.189±0.011		transit	524.414±21	1.40±0.25	6771±303	Unconfirmed
K2-133e		0.154^{+0.012}_{−0.012}	26.5841^{+0.0018}_{−0.0017}	0.1346±0.0011	296±10	transit	245.3±0.7	0.46±0.01	3655±80	Host star also known as LP 358-499
K2-146c	0.02358	0.195	4.00498		1093.7	transit	259	0.33	3385	
K2-166c		0.109^{+0.019}_{−0.015}	3.80464^{+0.00091}_{−0.00105}			transit	1568.81^{+31.64}_{−29.03}	1.07±0.03		
K2-168c		0.105^{+0.012}_{−0.009}	8.0468^{+0.0024}_{−0.0025}			transit	800.91±13.67	0.91±0.03		
K2-198c		0.1270	3.3596055		1229.9	transit	362	0.80	5213	
K2-198d		0.2175	7.4500177		943.2	transit	362	0.80	5213	
K2-282c		0.132^{+0.012}_{−0.009}	0.70531±0.00005			transit	1638.22±25.34	0.94±0.04	5499±109	3rd planet discovered in 2020
K2-286b	0.0214±0.0135	0.1873±0.0178	27.359±0.005	0.1768^{+0.0175}_{−0.0205}	347^{+21}_{−11}	transit	248.9±0.8	0.64±0.02	3926±100	
K2-288Bb		0.17±0.03	31.393463^{+0.000067}_{−0.000069}	0.164±0.030	226.36±22.30	transit	214.3±2.8	0.33±0.02	3341±276	
K2-290b	0.0664	0.273±0.014	9.21165^{+0.00033}_{−0.00034}	0.0923±0.0066	1230±38	transit	897±12	1.19^{+0.07}_{−0.08}	6302±120	Two planets on a retrograde orbit
K2-290c	0.774±0.047	1.006±0.050	48.36685^{+0.00041}_{−0.00040}	0.0923±0.0066	676±16	transit	897±12	1.19^{+0.07}_{−0.08}	6302±120	Two planets on a retrograde orbit
K2-291b	0.0204±0.0036	0.1418^{+0.0085}_{−0.0064}	2.225177^{+0.000066}_{−0.000068}	0.03261±0.00044		transit	295±2	0.93±0.04	5520±60	
K2-293b		0.219^{+0.031}_{−0.022}	13.1225^{+0.0011}_{−0.0012}		750^{+170}_{−50}	transit	1290±22	0.96^{+0.04}_{−0.03}	5532±78	
K2-294b		0.148^{+0.019}_{−0.017}	2.50387^{+0.00022}_{−0.00023}		1425^{+79}_{−54}	transit	1230±20	0.99^{+0.03}_{−0.03}	5612±50	
K2-296b		0.167^{+0.018}_{−0.04}	28.1656^{+0.0027}_{−0.0028}			transit	521.78±4.57	0.41^{+0.11}_{−0.05}		Host star also known as EPIC 201238110
K2-297b		0.062^{+0.005}_{−0.004}	2.13174±0.00022			transit	831.31±5.48	0.78^{+0.09}_{−0.17}		Host star also known as EPIC 201497682
K2-298b		0.098^{+0.012}_{−0.011}	4.16959^{+0.00051}_{−0.00053}			transit	1441.42±26.65	0.8^{+0.08}_{−0.16}		
K2-299b		0.152^{+0.053}_{−0.028}	4.50756^{+0.00062}_{−0.0006}			transit	1219.21±16.28	0.93^{+0.08}_{−0.1}	5724±72	Two more planets in star system discovered in 2020
K2-300b		0.09^{+0.021}_{−0.012}	2.87814^{+0.00023}_{−0.00026}			transit	528.67±5.87	0.22^{+0.04}_{−0.06}		
K2-301b		0.145^{+0.015}_{−0.017}	5.29711^{+0.00074}_{−0.0007}			transit	1491.42±44.98	0.56±0.05	4114±99	
K2-302b		0.08^{+0.017}_{−0.018}	2.25372±0.00047			transit	359.49±3.52	0.41^{+0.1}_{−0.08}		Two more planets in system discovered in 2020
K2-303b		0.086^{+0.01}_{−0.013}	1.58252^{+0.00017}_{−0.00018}			transit	1034.57±9.59	0.71^{+0.09}_{−0.03}		
K2-304b		0.118^{+0.007}_{−0.008}	2.28943±0.00019			transit	1380.78±23.94	0.83^{+0.09}_{−0.12}		
K2-305b		0.194^{+0.06}_{−0.037}	18.0983^{+0.006}_{−0.0058}			transit	2030.88±33.92	1.11^{+0.14}_{−0.12}		
K2-306b		0.143^{+0.012}_{−0.014}	34.885^{+0.011}_{−0.01}			transit	931.54±6.69	0.91^{+0.04}_{−0.16}		
K2-307b		0.1^{+0.011}_{−0.008}	15.2841^{+0.0037}_{−0.0029}			transit	1053.09±20.65	0.98^{+0.04}_{−0.03}	6004^{+77}_{−78}	Two more planets in system are suspected, second planet in system confirmed in 2021
K2-308b		0.884±0.087	3.38628±0.00002			transit		1.09±0.09	6100±263	
K2-310b		0.2307±0.0112	13.6030±0.0013	0.0980±0.0040	536±18	transit	1133.22	0.690±0.038	4684±79	
K2-310c		0.2400±0.0130	65.5500±0.0089	0.280±0.006	316±10	transit	1133.22	0.690±0.038	4684±79	
KELT-23Ab	0.938^{+0.048}_{−0.044}	1.323±0.025	2.255251^{+0.000011}_{−0.000012}	0.03302^{+0.00068}_{−0.00064}	1561±20	transit	409.07±1.14	0.94^{+0.06}_{−0.05}	5899±49	
KELT-24b	5.18	1.272	5.5514926	0.06969	1459	transit	313.2	1.46	6509	
Kepler-47d	0.05984^{+0.07501}_{−0.03672}	0.628^{+0.059}_{−0.044}	187.366^{+0.069}_{−0.051}	0.6992^{+0.0031}_{−0.0033}		transit	4900	0.957^{+0.013}_{−0.015}		
Kepler-65e	0.653^{+0.056}_{−0.055}		258.8^{+1.5}_{−1.3}	0.362±0.007		radial vel.	999.3±8.8	1.25±0.06	6211±66	
Kepler-82f	0.0658±0.0031		75.732±0.012	0.3395±0.0041		timing	3026.64	0.91±0.03	5401±108	
Kepler-88d	3.15±0.15		1409^{+14}_{−13}	2.45±0.02		radial vel.	1243±7	1.022^{+0.023}_{−0.026}	5513±67	
Kepler-411d	0.0478±0.0160	0.2961±0.0093	58.02035±0.00056	0.279±0.004	410±10	transit	500.94±1.57	0.87±0.04		
Kepler-411e	0.0340±0.0035		31.509728±0.000085	0.186±0.003	503±9	timing	500.94±1.57	0.87±0.04		
Kepler-448c	22		2500	4.2		timing	1318	1.5		
Kepler-1659b	0.028±0.001	0.17±0.02	13.608±0.00006	0.11229		transit	3812.7570	1.02		
Kepler-1659c	0.0014±0.001	0.17±0.03	20.4415±0.0013	0.1472		transit	3812.7570	1.02		
Kepler-1660b	7.693±0.054			237.68977±0.08237		timing	4013.68±73.27	1.21		This detection arose from a search for eclipse timing variations among the more than 2,000 eclipsing binaries observed by Kepler.
KMT-2016-BLG-0212Lb	18			2.2		microlensing	21000	0.48		
KMT-2016-BLG-1107Lb	3.283^{+3.468}_{−1.835}			0.342^{+0.070}_{−0.085}		microlensing	21700^{+3090}_{−4400}	0.087^{+0.092}_{−0.049}		
KMT-2016-BLG-1836L b	2.2^{+1.9}_{−1.1}			3.5^{+1.1}_{−0.9}		microlensing	23157.1^{+2609.25}_{−7827.753}	0.49^{+0.38}_{−0.25}		
KMT-2017-BLG-0165Lb	0.11^{+0.05}_{−0.04}			3.45^{+0.98}_{−0.95}		microlensing	14774.88	0.760^{+0.340}_{−0.270}		
KMT-2017-BLG-1038Lb	2.0^{+2.0}_{−1.1}			1.8^{+0.6}_{−0.5}		microlensing	19569.3826	0.37^{+0.36}_{−0.20}		
KMT-2017-BLG-1146Lb	0.710^{+0.800}_{−0.420}			1.6±0.6		microlensing	21200.16	0.33^{+0.36}_{−0.20}		
KMT-2018-BLG-1990Lb	0.348			0.763		microlensing	3150	0.09		
LHS 3844 b		0.1162±0.0020	0.46292913±0.00000190	0.00622±0.00017	805±20	transit	48.60±0.03	0.15±0.01	3036±77	
LP 791-18 b		0.0999	0.9480050	0.009690	650	transit	86.41	0.14	2960	
LP 791-18 c		0.206	4.989963	0.029392	370	transit	86.41	0.14	2960	
L 98-59 b	0.00157^{+0.00094}_{−0.00063}	0.071±0.004	2.25314±0.00002	0.0233±0.0017		transit	34.64	0.31±0.01	3367±150	
L 98-59 c	0.00755^{+0.00566}_{−0.00252}	0.12^{+0.007}_{−0.006}	3.690621^{+0.000013}_{−0.000014}	0.0324±0.0023-0.0024		transit	34.64	0.31±0.01	3367±150	
L 98-59 d	0.0107^{+0.0085}_{−0.0044}	0.14±0.012	7.45086^{+0.00004}_{−0.00005}	0.052±0.004		transit	34.64	0.31±0.01	3367±150	
L 1159-16 c	0.23±0.02		772.05^{+2.41}_{−1.84}	0.88±0.02		radial vel.	14.578±0.005	0.15±0.01	3154±54	Confirmed in 2022 as L 1159-16 b
LSPM J2116+0234 b	0.04185^{+0.00315}_{−0.00346}		14.4399^{+0.0078}_{−0.0087}	0.0876^{+0.0022}_{−0.0021}		radial vel.	57.53±0.07	0.43±0.03	3475±51	
LTT 1445 Ab	0.0069	0.123	5.35882	0.03807	433	transit	22.4	0.26	3337	
MOA-bin-29b	0.600			0.48		microlensing	23200	0.03		
NGTS-5b	0.229±0.037	1.136±0.023	3.3569866±0.0000026	0.0382±0.0013	952±24	transit	309.5±8.5	0.66^{+0.07}_{−0.06}	4987±41	
NGTS-6b	1.339	1.326	0.8820590	0.01677		transit	1010	0.77	4730	
NGTS-8b	0.93	1.09	2.49970	0.035	1345	transit	1420	0.89	5241	
NGTS-9b	2.90	1.07	4.43527	0.058	1448	transit	1420	1.34	6330	
NSVS 14256825 b	14.15±0.16		3225±22	3.12±0.07		timing	2734.2±137.31	0.42±0.07	40000	Disputed
NY Virginis c	5.54		8799			timing	1800			Disputed
OGLE-2013-BLG-0911L b	9.51^{+2.72}_{−1.69}					microlensing	10500^{+1500}_{−1100}	0.29^{+0.07}_{−0.05}		
OGLE-2015-BLG-1649L	2.54			2.07		microlensing	1380	0.34		
OGLE-2016-BLG-1227 b	0.79^{+1.3}_{−0.39}			3.4^{+2.1}_{−1}		microlensing		0.1^{+0.17}_{−0.05}		
OGLE-2018-BLG-0532Lb	0.02062^{+0.00285}_{−0.00254}			1.103^{+0.118}_{−0.107}		microlensing				
OGLE-2018-BLG-0596Lb	0.04383±0.00491			0.97±0.13		microlensing	18400±2400	0.23±0.03		
OGLE-2018-BLG-0740Lb	4.8		5480	6.1		microlensing	10400	1.0	5912	
OGLE-2018-BLG-1011Lb	1.8			6.1		microlensing	23000	0.18		
OGLE-2018-BLG-1011Lc	2.8			0.80		microlensing	23000	0.18		
PDS 70c	8.0±4.0			34.5±2		imaging	369.96±1.7	0.76±0.02	3972±36	
Qatar-8b	0.371±0.062	1.285±0.022	3.71495±0.00100	0.0474±0.0008	1457±14	transit	902.5±11	1.03±0.05	5738±51	
Qatar-9b	1.19±0.16	1.009±0.014	1.540731±0.000038	0.0234±0.0003	1134±9	transit	689.5±5.2	0.72±0.02	4309±31	
Qatar-10b	0.736±0.090	1.543±0.040	1.645321±0.000010	0.0286±0.0006	1955±25	transit	1760±33	1.16±0.07	6124±46	
SDSS J1228+1040 b		0.0009^{+0.0045}_{−0.000758}	0.0857±0.00021	0.0034±0.000009	1800	timing	413.337977±0.4892346	0.705±0.05		
Teegarden b	0.00330^{+0.00041}_{−0.00038}		4.9100±0.0014	0.0252^{+0.0008}_{−0.0009}		radial vel.	12.50±0.013	0.09±0.01	2904±51	
Teegarden c	0.00349^{+0.00050}_{−0.00047}		11.409±0.009	0.0443^{+0.0014}_{−0.0015}	226	radial vel.	12.50±0.013	0.09±0.01	2904±51	Potentially habitable exoplanet
TOI-125 b	0.0299±0.00277	0.2432±0.00669	4.65382±0.00033	0.05186^{+0.00086}_{−0.00077}	1037±11	transit	363.3382±1.435088	0.859^{+0.044}_{−0.038}	5320±39	
TOI-125 c	0.02086±0.00311	0.24614±0.009	9.15059^{+0.0007}_{−0.00082}	0.814±0.0013	827.8±8.6	transit	363.3382±1.435088	0.859^{+0.044}_{−0.038}	5320±39	
TOI-125 d	0.0428±0.0038	0.2614±0.0152	19.98^{+0.005}_{−0.0056}	0.05186^{+0.00086}_{−0.00077}	638.1±6.6	transit	363.3382±1.435088	0.859^{+0.044}_{−0.038}	5320±39	
TOI-150b	1.75^{+0.14}_{−0.17}	1.38±0.04	5.857342^{+0.000065}_{−0.000066}	0.0583^{+0.0013}_{−0.0018}	1493^{+29}_{−32}	transit	1095.89±6.52	1.25^{+0.07}_{−0.12}	6003^{+104}_{−98}	
TOI-163b	1.22	1.489	4.231306	0.0580	1669	transit	1359	1.44	6495	
TOI-172b	5.42^{+0.22}_{−0.20}	0.965^{+0.032}_{−0.029}	9.47725^{+0.00064}_{−0.00079}	0.0914±0.0017		transit	1097.418	1.128^{+0.065}_{−0.061}	5645±50	
TOI-175b	0.00126^{+0.00050}_{−0.00048}	0.0642^{+0.0046}_{−0.0035}	2.2531136^{+0.0000012}_{−0.0000015}	0.02191^{+0.00080}_{−0.00084}	627^{+33}_{−36}	transit	34.636±0.010	0.273±0.030	3415±135	To date, it is the lowest mass planet confirmed, or measured, using the radial velocity technique. Host star also known as L 98-59.
TOI-216 b	0.059±0.002	0.714^{+0.268}_{−0.179}	17.1607	0.1293^{+0.0067}_{−0.0051}	628^{+13}_{−11}	transit	583±3	0.77	5026±125	Semi-major axes are strongly variable due to planet-planet interaction on a timescale of few years
TOI-216 c	0.56±0.02	0.902±0.018	34.525528	0.2069^{+0.0107}_{−0.0082}	497^{+10}_{−8}	transit	583±3	0.77	5026±125	Semi-major axes are strongly variable due to planet-planet interaction on a timescale of few years
TOI-270b	0.0050	0.1112	3.360080	0.0306	528	transit	73.23	0.40	3386	
TOI-270c	0.0193	0.216	5.660172	0.0472	424	transit	73.23	0.40	3386	
TOI-270d	0.0150	0.190	11.38014	0.0733	340	transit	73.23	0.40	3386	Hydrogen and steam atmosphere
TOI-564b	1.463^{+0.10}_{−0.096}	1.02^{+0.71}_{−0.29}	1.651144±0.000018	0.02734^{+0.00061}_{−0.00053}	1714^{+20}_{−21}	transit	643.8±5.9	0.998^{+0.068}_{−0.057}	5640^{+34}_{−37}	
TOI-905b	0.667^{+0.042}_{−0.041}	1.171^{+0.052}_{−0.051}	3.739494±0.000038	0.04666^{+0.00096}_{−0.0011}	1192^{+39}_{−36}	transit	489.9^{+23.5}_{−22.5}	0.968^{+0.061}_{−0.068}	5570^{+150}_{−140}	
V1298 Tauri b		0.911^{+0.049}_{−0.053}	24.13861^{+0.00102}_{−0.00090}	0.1687^{+0.0025}_{−0.0026}	668±22	transit	353.9±2.3	1.10±0.05	4970±120	
V1298 Tauri c		0.499	8.24958	0.0825	845±27	transit	353.9	1.10	4970	
V1298 Tauri d		0.572	12.4032	0.1083	677±22	transit	353.9	1.10	4970	
V1298 Tauri e		0.780	60	0.308	492^{+66}_{−104}	transit	353.9	1.10	4970	
WASP-18Ac	0.174±0.039		2.1558	0.035		timing	404	1.22	6400	
WASP-169b	0.561	1.304	5.6114118	0.0681	1604	transit	2080	1.34	6110	
WASP-171b	1.084	0.980	3.8186244	0.05040	1642	transit	2530	1.17	5965	
WASP-175b	0.990	1.208	3.0652907	0.04403	1571	transit	2080	1.21	6229	
WASP-177b	0.508±0.038	1.58^{+0.66}_{−0.83}	3.071722±0.000001	0.03957±0.00058	1142±32	transit	580.5583	0.876±0.038	5017±70	
WASP-178b	1.66	1.81	3.3448285	0.0558	2470	transit	1360	2.07	9360	
WASP-180Ab	0.9	1.24	3.409264	0.048		transit	830	1.3	6600	
WASP-181b	0.299±0.034	1.184^{+0.071}_{−0.059}	4.159±0.0000034	0.00542±0.00069	1186^{+32}_{−26}	transit	1444.872	1.04±0.04	5839±70	
WASP-182b	0.148	0.850	3.3769848	0.0451	1479	transit	1080	1.08	5638	
WASP-183b	0.502±0.047	1.47^{+0.94}_{−0.33}	4.11177±0.0000051	0.0463±0.00075	1111±30	transit	1069.79292	1.00±0.03	0.784±0.038	
WASP-184b	0.57	1.33	5.18170	0.0627	1480	transit	2090	1.23	6000	
WASP-185b	0.980	1.25	9.38755	0.0904	1160	transit	897	1.12	5900	
WASP-192b	2.30	1.23	2.8786765	0.0408	1620	transit	1610	1.09	5910	

== Specific exoplanet lists ==
Lists of exoplanets

- List of directly imaged exoplanets
- List of exoplanet extremes
- List of exoplanet firsts
- List of exoplanets discovered by the Kepler space telescope
- List of exoplanets observed during Kepler's K2 mission
- List of exoplanets discovered by the TESS mission
- List of terrestrial exoplanet candidates for atmosphere detection
- List of hottest exoplanets
- List of coldest exoplanets
- List of multiplanetary systems
- List of circumbinary planets
- List of nearest exoplanets
- List of nearest terrestrial exoplanet candidates
- List of potentially habitable exoplanets
- List of proper names of exoplanets
- List of largest exoplanets
- List of smallest exoplanets
- List of transiting exoplanets
- List of exoplanets and planetary debris around giant stars
- List of exoplanets and planetary debris around white dwarfs
- List of extrasolar planetary collisions

=== Lists of exoplanets by year of discovery ===
- List of exoplanets discovered before 2000 (31)
- List of exoplanets discovered between 2000–2009 (376)
- List of exoplanets discovered in 2010 (109)
- List of exoplanets discovered in 2011 (178)
- List of exoplanets discovered in 2012 (147)
- List of exoplanets discovered in 2013 (149)
- List of exoplanets discovered in 2014 (869)
- List of exoplanets discovered in 2015 (144)
- List of exoplanets discovered in 2016 (1497)
- List of exoplanets discovered in 2017 (152)
- List of exoplanets discovered in 2018 (300)
- List of exoplanets discovered in 2019 (169)
- List of exoplanets discovered in 2020 (256)
- List of exoplanets discovered in 2021 (253)
- List of exoplanets discovered in 2022 (312)
- List of exoplanets discovered in 2023 (304)
- List of exoplanets discovered in 2024 (284)
- List of exoplanets discovered in 2025 (239)
- List of exoplanets discovered in 2026 (351)
