= Qatar-5 =

Star in the constellation Andromeda

Observation data Epoch J2000.0 Equinox ICRS
- Constellation: Andromeda
- Right ascension: 00^{h} 28^{m} 12.94^{s}
- Declination: +42° 03′ 40.9″
- Apparent magnitude (V): 12.82

Characteristics
- Evolutionary stage: main sequence star
- Spectral type: G2V
- Variable type: planetary transit

Astrometry
Proper motion (μ)	RA: 0.919±0.064 mas/yr Dec.: −6.509±0.100 mas/yr
Parallax (π)	2.693±0.058 mas
Distance	1,210 ± 30 ly (371 ± 8 pc)

Details
Mass	1.128±0.056 M_{☉}
Radius	1.076±0.051 R_{☉}
Luminosity	1.13 L_{☉}
Surface gravity (log g)	4.427±0.035 cgs
Temperature	5746±49 K
Metallicity [Fe/H]	0.38±0.08 dex
Rotational velocity (v sin i)	10.4±0.5 km/s
Age	530±4 Myr

Other designations
- Gaia DR2 382111248777193216, Qatar 5, 2MASS J00281293+4203407, TOI-1463

Database references
SIMBAD	data
Exoplanet Archive	data

Qatar-5 is a faint G-dwarf star that hosts a planet in the constellation Andromeda. With an apparent magnitude of 12.82, it is impossible to see with the naked eye, and can be detected with a powerful telescope. Qatar-5 is currently located about 1,211 light years away based on parallax.

== Properties ==
This star is a relatively young star with an age of only 5.47 billion years. At this age, it is still on the main sequence. Qatar-5 has 112.8% the mass of the Sun, and 107.6% the latter's radius. Despite all of this, it has 113% of the Sun's luminosity, which corresponds to an effective temperature of 5,746 K. Qatar-5 rotates at a rate of 10.4 km/s.

== Planetary system ==
In 2016, the Qatar Exoplanet Survey discovered a planet around this star.

The Qatar-5 planetary system
Companion (in order from star)	Mass	Semimajor axis (AU)	Orbital period (days)	Eccentricity	Inclination (°)	Radius
b	4.32±0.18 M_{J}	0.04127±0.00067	2.8792319	0	88.74±0.87	1.107±0.064 R_{J}

Qatar-5b
Discovery
- Discovered by: Alsubai et al. 2019
- Discovery date: 2016
- Detection method: Transit

Orbital characteristics
- Semi-major axis: 0.04127 ± 0.00067 au
- Eccentricity: 0
- Orbital period (sidereal): 2.8792319 d
- Inclination: 88.74 ± 0.87°
- Semi-amplitude: 568 ± 15 m/s

Physical characteristics
- Mean radius: 1.107 ± 0.064 R_{J}
- Mass: 4.32 ± 0.18 M_{J}
- Mean density: 3.95 ± 0.58 g cm^{−3}
- Temperature: 1415 ± 31 K

=== Qatar-5b ===
Qatar-5b is a Hot Jupiter orbiting the star Qatar-5 located in Andromeda constellation. It orbits its star every 2.87 days. It was discovered in 2016 by the Qatar Exoplanet Survey (QES).

==== Discovery ====
This planet was discovered by QES along with Qatar-3b and Qatar-4b. The light curves of the planet's respective host stars have been observed as well during the survey, along with their stellar properties

==== Properties ====
===== Orbit =====
This planet is another typical hot Jupiter. It orbits very close to its star with a period of 2 days, 21 hours, 6 minutes, and 5.6 seconds. This corresponds with an orbital distance of 0.04127 AU, which is about 10 times closer to its star than Mercury is to the Sun. With an eccentricity of 0, this suggests that Qatar-5b is on a perfectly circular orbit.

===== Physical properties =====
Qatar-5b is a massive planet, with 4.32 times the mass of Jupiter, but a similar radius. With a density of 3.95 g cm^{−3}, this is one of the densest planets discovered. With an effective temperature of 1,415 K, it is a scorching planet.

== See also ==
- Qatar-1
- Qatar-2
- Qatar-3
- Qatar-4
