= Qatar-3 =

Star in the constellation Andromeda

Observation data Epoch J2000.0 Equinox J2000.0
- Constellation: Andromeda
- Right ascension: 23^{h} 56^{m} 36.48327^{s}
- Declination: +36° 12′ 46.7749″
- Apparent magnitude (V): 12.88

Characteristics
- Evolutionary stage: subgiant
- Spectral type: G0V
- Variable type: planetary transit

Astrometry
Radial velocity (R_{v})	−2.32±13.31 km/s
Proper motion (μ)	RA: −17.868 mas/yr Dec.: −8.553 mas/yr
Parallax (π)	1.5818±0.0218 mas
Distance	2,060 ± 30 ly (632 ± 9 pc)

Details
Mass	1.145±0.064 M_{☉}
Radius	1.272±0.14 R_{☉}
Luminosity	1.90±0.46 L_{☉}
Surface gravity (log g)	4.28±0.05 cgs
Temperature	5,991±64 K
Metallicity [Fe/H]	−0.041±0.081 dex
Rotation	6.31
Rotational velocity (v sin i)	10.4±0.5 km/s
Age	310±1 Myr

Other designations
- Gaia DR3 2878641361300809856

Database references
SIMBAD	data

Qatar-3 is a 12th magnitude star located in the northern constellation Andromeda. It is host to a transiting planet. With a radial velocity of 10.99 km/s, it is drifting away from the Solar System, and is currently located 2,400 light years away based on its annual parallax.

== Properties ==
This star is a G-type star with 14.5% more mass than the Sun, and 27.2% larger. It has a luminosity of almost two times that of the Sun, and has effective temperature of 5,991 K, which gives it a yellow hue. Qatar-3 is also a metal poor star that has a similar metallicity to the Sun, and has a rapid rotation rate of 10.4 km/s. This means it takes Qatar-3 6.31 days to complete a full rotation, while the Sun takes almost a month to rotate.

== Planetary system ==
In 2016, the Qatar Exoplanet Survey discovered a planet around Qatar-3, Qatar-4, and Qatar-5, which was led by an international team in Qatar. Qatar-3b is a massive planet, with 4.31 times the mass of Jupiter, and has a similar radius to the latter. With a density of 4.0 g/cm^{3}, this is one of the densest planets discovered. With an effective temperature of 1,681 K, it is a scorching planet.

The Qatar-3 planetary system
Companion (in order from star)	Mass	Semimajor axis (AU)	Orbital period (days)	Eccentricity	Inclination	Radius
b	4.31±0.47 M_{J}	0.03783±0.00069	2.5079204	0	86.8±2.0°	1.096±0.14 R_{J}

Qatar-3b
Discovery
- Discovered by: Alsubai et al. 2019
- Discovery date: 2016
- Detection method: Transit

Orbital characteristics
- Semi-major axis: 0.03783±0.00069 au
- Eccentricity: 0
- Orbital period (sidereal): 2.5079204 d
- Inclination: 86.8°±2.0°
- Semi-amplitude: 587±58 m/s

Physical characteristics
- Mean radius: 1.096±0.14 jupiter radius
- Mass: 4.31±0.47 jupiter mass
- Mean density: 4.0±1.2 g/cm^{3}
- Temperature: 1,681±84 K

=== Qatar-3b ===
Qatar-3b is a hot Jupiter. It orbits its star every 2.5 days. It was discovered in 2016 by the Qatar Exoplanet Survey (QES). This planet was discovered by QES along with Qatar-4b and Qatar-5b. The light curves of the planet's respective host stars have been observed as well during the survey, along with their stellar properties.

==== Orbit ====
This planet is another typical hot Jupiter. It orbits very close to its star with a period of 2 days, 12 hours, 11 minutes, and 24 seconds. This corresponds with an orbital distance of about 0.04 AU, which is 10 times closer to its star than Mercury is to the Sun. With an eccentricity of 0, this suggests that Qatar-3b is on a perfectly circular orbit.

==== Physical properties ====
Qatar-3b is a massive planet, with 4.31 times the mass of Jupiter, but a similar radius. With a density of 4.0 g cm^{−3}, this is one of the densest planets discovered. With an effective temperature of 1,681 K, it is a scorched planet.
