= Qatar-4 =

Star in the constellation Andromeda

Observation data Epoch J2000.0 Equinox ICRS
- Constellation: Andromeda
- Right ascension: 00^{h} 19^{m} 26.22^{s}
- Declination: +44° 01′ 39.5″
- Apparent magnitude (V): 13.60

Characteristics
- Evolutionary stage: main sequence
- Spectral type: K1V
- Variable type: planetary transit

Astrometry
Proper motion (μ)	RA: 0.923±0.011 mas/yr Dec.: −8.921±0.009 mas/yr
Parallax (π)	3.0567±0.0158 mas
Distance	1,067 ± 6 ly (327 ± 2 pc)

Details
Mass	0.856^{+0.029}_{−0.030} M_{☉}
Radius	0.800^{+0.015}_{−0.014} R_{☉}
Luminosity	0.481 L_{☉}
Surface gravity (log g)	4.565^{+0.018}_{−0.020} cgs
Temperature	5174^{+33}_{−35} K
Metallicity [Fe/H]	0.095^{+0.076}_{−0.088} dex
Rotational velocity (v sin i)	7.1±0.5 km/s
Age	170±0.1 Myr

Other designations
- Gaia DR3 385697172809355392, Qatar 4, UCAC3 269-3518

Database references
SIMBAD	data
Exoplanet Archive	data

Qatar-4 is a faint K-dwarf star that hosts a planet in the constellation Andromeda. With an apparent magnitude of 13.60, it is impossible to detect with the naked eye, but can be detected with a powerful telescope. Qatar-4 is currently located 1,083 light years away based on parallax.

== Properties ==
This star is a relatively young star with an age of only 170 million years. At this age, it is still on the main sequence. Qatar-4 has 89.6% the mass of the Sun, and 84.9% the latter's radius. Despite all of this, it only has 48.1% of the Sun's luminosity, which corresponds to an effective temperature of 5,120 K. Qatar-4 has a similar metallicity to the Sun, and rotates at a rate of 7.1 km/s.

== Planetary system ==
In 2016, the Qatar Exoplanet Survey discovered a planet around this star.

The Qatar-4 planetary system
Companion (in order from star)	Mass	Semimajor axis (AU)	Orbital period (days)	Eccentricity	Inclination (°)	Radius
b	5.26^{+0.22}_{−0.21} M_{J}	0.02861	1.80536494±9^{−7}	0.046^{+0.064}_{−0.034}	87.5±1.6	1.083^{+0.022}_{−0.021} R_{J}

Qatar-4b
Discovery
- Discovered by: Alsubai et al. 2019
- Detection method: Transit

Orbital characteristics
- Semi-major axis: 0.02803 ± 0.00048 au
- Eccentricity: 0
- Orbital period (sidereal): 1.8053564 d
- Inclination: 87.5 ± 1.6°
- Semi-amplitude: 957±16 m/s

Physical characteristics
- Mean radius: 1.135 ± 0.11 R_{J}
- Mass: 5.36 ± 0.20 M_{J}
- Mean density: 4.50 ± 1.00 g cm^{−3}
- Temperature: 1385 ± 50 K

=== Qatar-4b ===
Qatar-4b is a Super-Jupiter orbiting the star Qatar-4 every 1.8 days. It was discovered in 2016 by the Qatar Exoplanet Survey (QES).

This planet has a very short orbit, with only 1.8 days for it to complete an orbit around Qatar-4. The period corresponds with a separation of around 0.03 AU, which is almost 20 times closer than Mercury is to the Sun. Despite that, it has a perfectly round orbit. Since the host is an active star, Qatar-4 may be destroyed by tidal waves from the star.

Qatar-4b has over 5 times the mass of Jupiter. Despite this, it has a radius that is only 13.5% larger than the latter's. This planet has an effective temperature of 1,385 K, which classifies as a hot Jupiter, and is denser than Jupiter, with about 4 times the density.

== See also ==
- Qatar-1
- Qatar-2
- Qatar-3
- Qatar-5
