= G 9-40 b =

Super-Earth orbiting G 9-40

Discovery
- Discovery date: December 2019
- Detection method: radial velocity and transit

Designations
- Alternative names: K2-313 b

Orbital characteristics
- Semi-major axis: 0.04180±0.00064 AU
- Eccentricity: 0
- Orbital period (sidereal): 5.7459982(20) d
- Inclination: 89.03°±0.10°

Physical characteristics
- Mean radius: 1.900±0.065 R_{🜨}
- Mass: 4.00±0.63 M_{🜨}
- Mean density: 3.20+0.63 −0.58 g/cm^{3}
- Surface gravity: 10.8±1.8 m/s^{2}
- Temperature: 440.6±7.6 K (167.5 °C; 333.4 °F, equilibrium)

G 9-40 b is a sub-Neptune exoplanet that has an orbital period of 5.7 days. The host star is a red dwarf located in the constellation Cancer 91 light-years (28 parsecs) away from Earth. The planet was discovered in 2019. The planet's density is too low for a rocky composition, suggesting that it is either water-rich or has a significant hydrogen atmosphere.

== See also ==
- List of exoplanets discovered in 2019
