= K296 =

K296 or K-296 may refer to:

- K-296 (Kansas highway), a former state highway in Kansas
- K296GB, a radio station
- K2-296b, a planet
- K.296 Violin Sonata No. 17 (Mozart) in C (1778)
