= HR 858 =

Star in the constellation Fornax

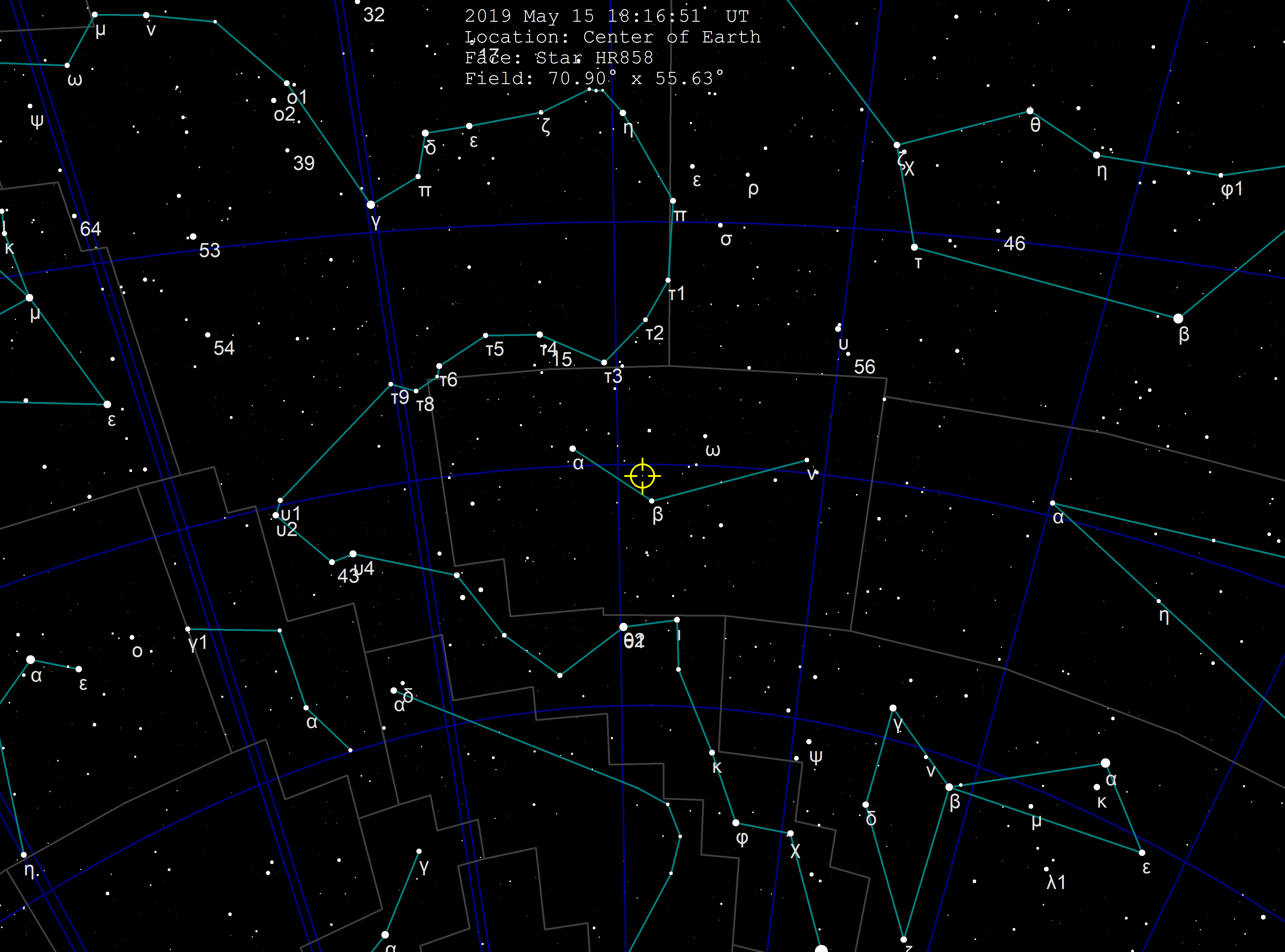
- Position of HR 858 in Fornax

Observation data Epoch J2000.00 Equinox ICRS
- Constellation: Fornax
- Right ascension: 02^{h} 51^{m} 56.246^{s}
- Declination: −30° 48′ 52.26″
- Apparent magnitude (V): 6.382

Characteristics
- Evolutionary stage: Main sequence
- Spectral type: F6V + M
- B−V color index: +0.484

Astrometry
Radial velocity (R_{v})	+9.77±0.12 km/s
Proper motion (μ)	RA: 123.435(25) mas/yr Dec.: 105.996(37) mas/yr
Parallax (π)	31.5418±0.0352 mas
Distance	103.4 ± 0.1 ly (31.70 ± 0.04 pc)
Absolute magnitude (M_{V})	+3.82

Details

A
Mass	1.204±0.052 M_{☉}
Radius	1.258±0.019 R_{☉}
Luminosity	2.31±0.12 L_{☉}
Surface gravity (log g)	4.30±0.06 cgs
Temperature	6,354±70 K
Metallicity [Fe/H]	0.025±0.050 dex
Rotation	6.7±1.3 d
Rotational velocity (v sin i)	7.5±0.2 km/s
Age	2.0±0.6 Gyr

B
Radius	0.17±0.04 R_{☉}
Temperature	2,800±300 K

Other designations
- CD−31°1148, GC 3443, HD 17926, HIP 13363, HR 858, SAO 193951, TOI-396, TIC 178155732

Database references
SIMBAD	data
Exoplanet Archive	data

HR 858 (also known as HD 17926 or TOI-396) is a star with a planetary system located 103 light-years (31.5 parsecs) from the Sun in the southern constellation of Fornax. It has a yellow-white hue and is visible to the naked eye, but it is a challenge to see with an apparent visual magnitude of 6.4. The star is drifting further away with a radial velocity of 10 km/s. It has an absolute magnitude of +3.82.

This object is a slightly-evolved F-type main-sequence star with a stellar classification of F6V, which indicates it is generating energy through core hydrogen fusion. It is roughly two billion years old and is spinning with a projected rotational velocity of 8.3 km/s. The star has 1.1 times the mass of the Sun and 1.3 times the Sun's radius. It is radiating 2.3 times the luminosity of the Sun from its photosphere at an effective temperature of 6,201 K.

A faint co-moving stellar companion, designated component B, at an angular separation of 8.4″. This corresponds to a projected separation of 270 AU. It is a red dwarf star.

== Planetary system ==
In May 2019, HR 858 was announced to have at least 3 exoplanets as observed by the transit method with the Transiting Exoplanet Survey Satellite. All three are orbiting close to the host star and are close in size, each about twice the radius of the Earth. Described as super-Earths by their discovery paper, measurements of their masses suggest that in terms of composition they may be better described as sub-Neptunes. Planets 'b' and 'c' may be in a 3:5 mean-motion resonance.

Further research measured the masses of the planets b and d using accurate radial velocities, giving masses of 3.55 and 7.1 M_{🜨} as well as planetary densities of 2.44 and 4.9 g/cm^{3}. The system displays significant transit timing variations. The mass of planet c could not be measured using radial velocities, but it is constrained to be less than 3.8 M_{🜨}, and a not very reliable value of 2.24 M_{🜨} was measured using TTVs.

The HR 858 planetary system (Note: In the 2024 model of the system used here the orbits are assumed to be circular. The 2019 discovery paper finds upper limits on the planets' eccentricities of 0.30, 0.19, and 0.28, respectively.)
Companion (in order from star)	Mass	Semimajor axis (AU)	Orbital period (days)	Eccentricity	Inclination (°)	Radius
b	3.55+0.94 −0.96 M_{🜨}	0.04888±0.00066	3.585287+0.000009 −0.000012	0	85.98+0.26 −0.25	2.004+0.045 −0.047 R_{🜨}
c	<3.8 M_{🜨}	0.06870±0.00092	5.973865+0.000015 −0.000016	0	86.59+0.15 −0.14	1.979+0.054 −0.051 R_{🜨}
d	7.1±1.6 M_{🜨}	0.1046±0.0014	11.230511+0.000043 −0.000045	0	87.72+0.10 −0.11	2.001+0.063 −0.064 R_{🜨}

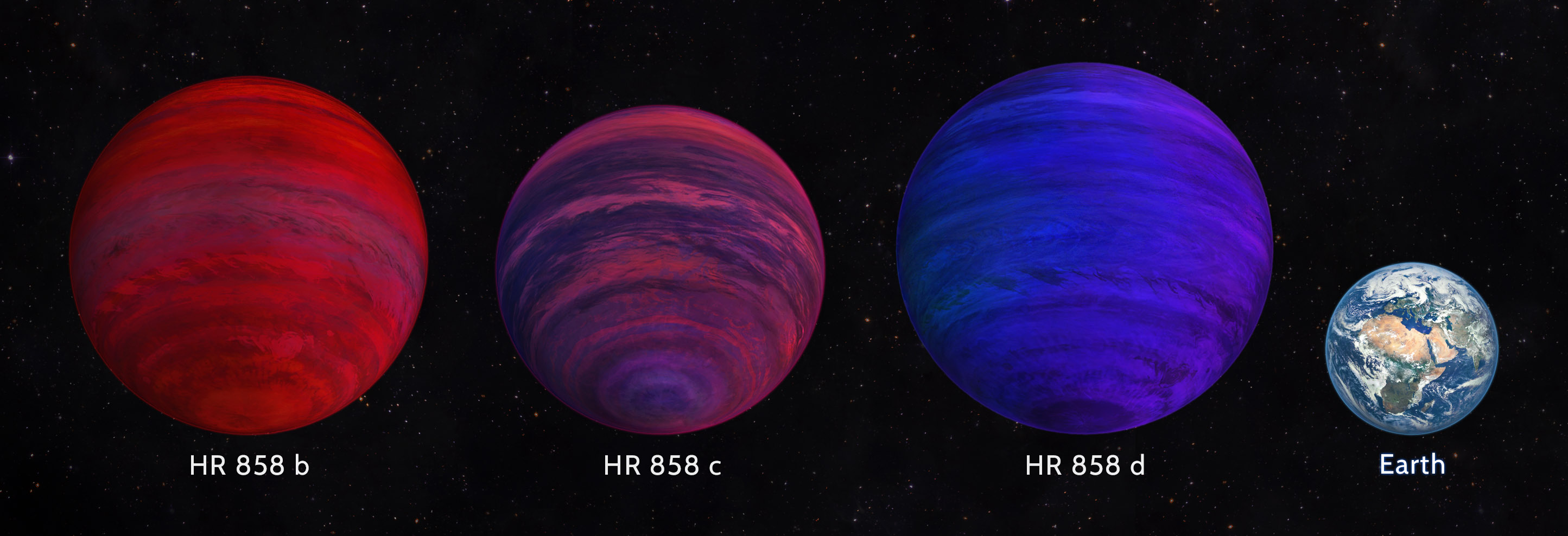
Artist's impression of known planets in the HR 858 system and their size comparison with Earth
