= Qatar Exoplanet Survey =

Astronomical survey

- Survey type: Exoplanet search survey
- Named after: the country Qatar
- Observatory code: H06
- Started: 24, November 2010
- Website: qatarexoplanet.org (defunct)

The Qatar Exoplanet Survey, also known as QES, is an international exoplanet search survey based in Qatar. Its main goal is to detect exoplanets using the transit method, which is observing the light curve of the host star.

== History ==
This survey has a site in New Mexico, which was a collaboration to find small planets in the northern sky. Before it found its own planets, it detected WASP-36b and WASP-37b.

== Site ==
There is a telescope with 5 cameras, which are each 400m, which is also located in New Mexico. It has been operating since 2011 which occasional errors.

== Results ==
- In 2011, QES announced the discovery of Qatar-1b, a hot Jupiter that has similar parameters to Jupiter.

- In 2017, QES discovered 3 massive planets, which are 4-6 times more massive than Jupiter. These planets are Qatar-3b, Qatar-4b, which is the largest, and Qatar-5b. As well Qatar-6b was discovered in 2017.

- In 2019, QES discovered 3 hot Jupiters, those planets being Qatar-8b, Qatar-9b, and Qatar-10b (with Qatar-8b being a hot Saturn).

== List ==
This list is incomplete and needs more information.

Light green indicates it orbits one of stars in a binary system.

Star	Constellation	Right ascension	Declination	App. mag.	Distance (ly)	Spectral Type	Planet	Mass (M_{J})	Radius (R_{J})	Orbital (d)	Semimajor (AU)	Orbital Eccentricity	Inclination (°)	Discovery year
Qatar-1	Draco	20^{h} 13^{m} 31.65^{s}	+65° 09′ 44.39″	12.69	609	K3V	Qatar-1b	1.09	1.16	1.42	0.02343	0 (fixed)	83.47	2010
Qatar-2	Virgo	13^{h} 50^{m} 37.32^{s}	−06° 48′ 14.66″	13.30	595	K5V	Qatar-2b	2.49	1.144	1.34	0.02149	0 (fixed	88.30 ± 0.94	2011
Qatar-3	Andromeda	23^{h} 56^{m} 36.47^{s}	+36° 12′ 46.64″	12.93	2,400	G0V	Qatar-3b	4.31	1.096	2.51	0.03783	0 (fixed)	86.8 ± 2	2017
Qatar-4	Andromeda	0^{h} 19^{m} 26.23^{s}	44° 01′ 39.35″	13.57	1,089	K1V	Qatar-4b	6.1	1.135	1.81	0.02803	0 (fixed)	87.5 ± 1.6	2017
Qatar-5	Andromeda	0^{h} 28^{m} 12.94^{s}	+42° 03′ 40.84″	12.61		G2V	Qatar-5b	4.32	1.107	2.88	0.04127	0 (fixed)	88.74 ± 0.87	2017
Qatar-6	Boötes	14^{h} 48^{m} 50.42^{s}	+22° 09′ 09.41″	11.5		K2V	Qatar-6b	0.67	1.062	3.51	0.0423	0 (fixed)	86.01 ± 0.14	2017
Qatar-7	Andromeda	23^{h} 54^{m} 03.63^{s}	+37° 01′ 18.57″	13.13		F4V	Qatar-7b	1.88	1.70	2.03	0.0352	0 (fixed)	89.0 ± 1	2019
Qatar-8	Ursa Major	10^{h} 29^{m} 38.96^{s}	+70° 31′ 37.50″	11.71	924	G0V	Qatar-8b	0.37	1.285	3.71	0.0474	0 (fixed)	89.29 ± 0.7	2019
Qatar-9	Ursa Major	10^{h} 42^{m} 59.54^{s}	+60° 57′ 50.83″	14.02		K5V	Qatar-9b	1.19	1.01	1.54	0.0234	0 (fixed)	89.23 ± 0.64	2019
Qatar-10	Draco	18^{h} 57^{m} 47.00^{s}	+69° 34′ 15.00″	12.80	1343	F7V	Qatar-10b	0.736	1.534	1.645	0.0474	0 (fixed)	89.29 ± 0.70	2019
