= GJ 9827 =

Orange-hued star in the constellation Pisces

- Artist's impression of GJ 9827 system

Observation data Epoch J2000 Equinox ICRS
- Constellation: Pisces
- Right ascension: 23^{h} 27^{m} 04.83769^{s}
- Declination: −01° 17′ 10.5827″
- Apparent magnitude (V): 10.25

Characteristics
- Evolutionary stage: main sequence
- Spectral type: K6 V
- B−V color index: +1.30

Astrometry
Radial velocity (R_{v})	32.01±0.27 km/s
Proper motion (μ)	RA: 375.977 mas/yr Dec.: 215.870 mas/yr
Parallax (π)	33.7247±0.0169 mas
Distance	96.71 ± 0.05 ly (29.65 ± 0.01 pc)
Absolute magnitude (M_{V})	+7.97

Details
Mass	0.606+0.015 −0.014 M_{☉}
Radius	0.602+0.005 −0.004 R_{☉}
Luminosity	0.119+0.035 −0.029 L_{☉}
Surface gravity (log g)	4.682±0.021 cgs
Temperature	4,236±12 K
Metallicity [Fe/H]	−0.29±0.03 dex
Rotation	28.16+3.38 −2.66 d
Rotational velocity (v sin i)	<1.75 km/s
Age	10+3 −5 Gyr

Other designations
- BD−02°5958, GJ 9827, HIP 115752, LTT 9542, 2MASS J23270480-0117108, K2-135

Database references
SIMBAD	data
Exoplanet Archive	data
ARICNS	data

GJ 9827 is a star in the constellation of Pisces. It is a K-type main-sequence star with an apparent magnitude of 10.25. It is 97 light-years (30 parsecs) away, based on parallax.

The rotation period of the star could not be determined as of 2020, and could be either around 15 or 30 days, depending on the interpretation of available data.

== Planetary system ==
The GJ 9827 planetary system
Companion (in order from star)	Mass	Semimajor axis (AU)	Orbital period (days)	Eccentricity	Inclination (°)	Radius
b	4.28+0.35 −0.33 M_{🜨}	0.0189(4)	1.208974(1)	<0.063	87.60+1.31 −1.27	1.44+0.09 −0.07 R_{🜨}
c	1.86+0.37 −0.39 M_{🜨}	0.0395(9)	3.648103(13)	<0.094	89.09+0.60 −0.68	1.13+0.07 −0.05 R_{🜨}
d	3.02+0.58 −0.57 M_{🜨}	0.0563(12)	6.201812(9)	<0.13	87.66+0.13 −0.16	1.89+0.16 −0.14 R_{🜨}

GJ 9827 has 3 transiting planets seen by the Kepler space observatory in their K2 survey. As of October 2017, it was the closest star discovered to have transiting exoplanets found by either the Kepler or K2 missions. The planets (b, c, d) have radii of 1.62, 1.27, and 2.09 times that of the Earth, and periods of 1.209, 3.648, and 6.201 days (ratios 1:3:5). Because of its close distance the system is considered an excellent target for studying atmospherics of exoplanets.

In late 2017, the masses of all three planets were determined using the Planet Finder Spectrograph on the Magellan II Telescope. Planet b was found to be very iron-rich, planet c appears to be mainly rocky, and planet d is a typical volatile-rich planet. GJ 9827b is noted as being one of the densest planets yet found, with its mass containing about ≥50% iron.

More precise radial velocity measurements released in late February 2018 revealed that all three planets have a lower density than Earth and have some amount of volatiles in their compositions. GJ 9827b and c are mainly rocky (containing less than 1% mass fraction of water, and negligible helium and hydrogen) with very thin volatile envelopes, while GJ 9827d is more akin to a mini-Neptune. The loss of primordial atmosphere was indirectly confirmed in 2020, as no helium was detected at GJ 9827 d. With a mass of about 1.5 M_{🜨}, GJ 9827c is one of the least massive planets detected with radial velocity. The atmospheres for GJ 9827b and GJ 9827d were not detected at all in 2021 observations.

A 2023 study using the Hubble Space Telescope detected water vapor in the atmosphere of GJ 9827 d. This study describes the planet as a potential ocean world.

A 2024 study used the Échelle SPectrograph for Rocky Exoplanets and Stable Spectroscopic Observations (ESPRESSO) of the European Southern Observatory to model the stellar activity of GJ 9827 and derive masses, orbital periods and radial velocity amplitudes of planets b, c, and d.

A 2024 study by the James Webb Space Telescope found that GJ 9827 d has a steam H_{2}O atmosphere, making it the first discovered steam world.
