= HD 15337 =

Star in the constellation Fornax

- Location of HD 15337 (circled)

Observation data Epoch J2000.0 Equinox ICRS
- Constellation: Fornax
- Right ascension: 02^{h} 27^{m} 28.37813^{s}
- Declination: −27° 38′ 06.7368″
- Apparent magnitude (V): 9.09

Characteristics
- Spectral type: K1V
- B−V color index: 0.86
- J−H color index: 0.338
- J−K color index: 0.509

Astrometry
Radial velocity (R_{v})	−3.882 km/s
Proper motion (μ)	RA: -73.581 mas/yr Dec.: −211.935 mas/yr
Parallax (π)	22.2922±0.016 mas
Distance	146.3 ± 0.1 ly (44.86 ± 0.03 pc)
Absolute magnitude (M_{V})	+6.07

Orbit
Period (P)	760+550 −280 yr
Semi-major axis (a)	88+38 −23 AU
Eccentricity (e)	0.746+0.082 −0.100
Inclination (i)	116±13°

Details

A
Mass	0.905±0.045 M_{☉}
Radius	0.855±0.008 R_{☉}
Luminosity	0.472+0.023 −0.024 L_{☉}
Surface gravity (log g)	4.37±0.08 cgs
Temperature	5131±74 K
Metallicity [Fe/H]	0.03±0.04 dex
Rotation	36.55 d
Age	9.6+3.8 −3.9 Gyr

B
Mass	0.262+0.019 −0.018 M_{☉}

Other designations
- CD−28°784, CPD−28°228, HD 15337, HIP 11433, SAO 167802, PPM 245027, TOI-402, TIC 120896927, TYC 6435-434-1, 2MASS J02272838-2738064, Gaia DR3 5068777809824976256

Database references
SIMBAD	data

HD 15337 (TOI-402) is a binary star in the southern constellation of Fornax. It has an apparent magnitude of 9.09, making it too faint to be observed by the naked eye from Earth, but readily visible using a small telescope. It is located 146 light-years (45 parsecs) distant based on stellar parallax, and is currently heading towards the Solar System with a radial velocity of −3.9 km/s.

== Characteristics ==
This is a relatively wide system with an orbital period that is thought to be 760 years. The semi-major axis is 88 AU, but the eccentricity of the orbit is high, at 0.75.

The primary is about 15% smaller than the Sun in both mass and radius and radiates slightly less than half the Sun's luminosity from its photosphere. It has a spectral type of K1V and an effective temperature of 5,131 K (4,858 °C; 8,776 °F), giving the star an orange hue. It is 9.6+3.8
−3.9 billion years old, making it much older than the Solar System. The star has a solar-like metallicity and displays similar amounts of stellar activity to the Sun, though when the star was only 150 million years old, it may have emitted between 3.7 and 127 times the high-energy luminosity of the Sun in the present day.

The secondary has just 26% of the mass of the Sun.

== Planetary system ==
In May 2019, a pair of exoplanets were discovered to revolve around the primary star through transit observations by the TESS space telescope, namely HD 15337 b and c. The two planets are far closer to their host star than Mercury is to the Sun (0.3871 AU), which heats them up to equilibrium temperatures of 1,001 K (728 °C; 1,342 °F) and 642 K (369 °C; 696 °F), respectively, both of which are hot enough to melt lead (m.p. 327 °C).

The inner planet, HD 15337 b, has a radius of 1.770 R_{🜨} and a mass of 6.519 M_{🜨}. This places its density at 6.458 g/cm^{3}, meaning it is denser than Earth (5.513 g/cm^{3}) and very likely to be a rocky super-Earth. The outer planet, c, is only slightly more massive than b at 6.792 M_{🜨}, but possesses a radius over 40% larger, which makes it much less dense at 2.303 g/cm^{3}, suggesting a mini-Neptune-like composition with a thick (>0.01 M_{🜨}) gaseous envelope probably consisting of hydrogen and helium. This striking difference in the structure of the two planets in spite of their similar masses implies that the two planets are on opposite sides of the small planet radius gap, making the HD 15337 system a prime target for research in planetary formation and evolution.

In 2024, the planetary parameters of both planets were precisely gauged through photometric observations by CHEOPS and radial velocity measurements by HARPS. As a result, the uncertainties of HD 15337 b's mass and radius were each reduced to less than 2% and 7%, which put the planet among the most accurately characterized terrestrial exoplanets at the time. Additionally, the radius of HD 15337 c was constrained to within a 3% margin of error.

The HD 15337 A planetary system
Companion (in order from star)	Mass	Semimajor axis (AU)	Orbital period (days)	Eccentricity	Inclination (°)	Radius
b	6.519 M_{🜨}	0.05245	4.7559804	0.058	89.30	1.770 R_{🜨}
c	6.792 M_{🜨}	0.1235	17.180546	0.096	88.41	2.526 R_{🜨}

== See also ==
- Kepler-93b: another precisely characterized hot super-Earth.
