= Steam world =

Exoplanet with atmosphere made mostly of hot water vapor

Artistic representation of GJ 9827d, a possible steam planet

A steam world is a type of exoplanet, with an atmosphere consisting of hot water vapor, or steam.

The first discovered steam world is GJ 9827 d which was characterized by the James Webb Space Telescope in 2024, led by a study team in the University of Montréal's Trottier Institute for Research on Exoplanets. GJ 9827 d was first discovered by the Kepler Space Telescope back in 2017, and in 2023 the Hubble Space Telescope detected traces of water vapor in its atmosphere for the first time.

A particular characteristic of steam worlds is that they tend to be Sub-Neptune exoplanets. It is unlikely that steam worlds are capable of supporting life as we know it.
