= Core-powered mass loss =

Core-powered mass loss refers to the loss of atmosphere of super-Earths and sub-Neptunes due to the heat from their rocky cores. It is an alternative mechanism to photoevaporation to explain the small planet radius gap.
