= HD 85628 =

Binary star in Carina

Observation data Epoch J2000.0 Equinox ICRS
- Constellation: Carina
- A
- Right ascension: 09^{h} 50^{m} 19.201^{s}
- Declination: −66° 06′ 49.90″
- Apparent magnitude (V): 8.19
- B
- Right ascension: 09^{h} 50^{m} 18.697^{s}
- Declination: −66° 06′ 53.00″

Characteristics

A
- Evolutionary stage: main sequence
- Spectral type: A3V
- Variable type: planetary transit

B
- Evolutionary stage: main sequence
- Spectral type: K8V

Astrometry

A
Proper motion (μ)	RA: 5.910±0.019 mas/yr Dec.: −15.044±0.019 mas/yr
Parallax (π)	5.9437±0.0170 mas
Distance	549 ± 2 ly (168.2 ± 0.5 pc)

B
Proper motion (μ)	RA: 5.702±0.032 mas/yr Dec.: −13.161±0.029 mas/yr
Parallax (π)	5.9266±0.0253 mas
Distance	550 ± 2 ly (168.7 ± 0.7 pc)

Details

A
Mass	1.75 M_{☉}
Radius	1.92 R_{☉}
Luminosity	12.2 L_{☉}
Surface gravity (log g)	4.1 cgs
Temperature	7,800 K
Metallicity [Fe/H]	~0 dex
Age	0.8 Gyr

B
Mass	0.6 M_{☉}
Temperature	4,088 K

Other designations
- bRing-1, HD 85628, MASCARA-4

Database references
SIMBAD	data

HD 85628 (MASCARA-4) is a binary star system in the constellation of Carina. The host star, HD 85628 A, is an A-type main-sequence star, the primary star of the system, with a hot Jupiter in orbit around it. The secondary star is HD 85628 B, a K-type main-sequence star. Little is known about it.

== Nomenclature ==
This star system was first catalogued in the Henry Draper Catalog as HD 85628, its most common name. The Henry Draper Catalogue gave stars visible to the naked eye in suitable conditions a designation, indicating that this star can be seen with the naked eye. But in 2019, the Multi-site All-Sky Camera announced the discovery of the exoplanet HD 85628 Ab/MASCARA-4b around HD 85628 A. Thus, the primary star is sometimes catalogued as MASCARA-4.

== Planetary system ==
In 2019, a hot Jupiter exoplanet was discovered by MASCARA using the transit method around HD 85628 A.

The HD 85628 A planetary system
Companion (in order from star)	Mass	Semimajor axis (AU)	Orbital period (days)	Eccentricity	Inclination (°)	Radius
b	3.1 M_{J}	0.047	2.8	0	—	—
