= LP 791-18 =

Red dwarf star in the constellation Crater

Observation data Epoch J2000 Equinox ICRS
- Constellation: Crater
- Right ascension: 11^{h} 02^{m} 45.95462^{s}
- Declination: −16° 24′ 22.2882″
- Apparent magnitude (V): 16.9±0.2

Characteristics
- Evolutionary stage: Main sequence
- Spectral type: M6.1±0.7V

Astrometry
Proper motion (μ)	RA: -221.291 mas/yr Dec.: -58.841 mas/yr
Parallax (π)	37.5225±0.0392 mas
Distance	86.92 ± 0.09 ly (26.65 ± 0.03 pc)

Details
Mass	0.139±0.005 M_{☉}
Radius	0.17±0.018 R_{☉}
Temperature	2960±55 K
Metallicity [Fe/H]	-0.09±0.19 dex
Age	0.5±0.064 Gyr

Other designations
- LP 791-18, TOI-736, TIC 181804752, 2MASS J11024596-1624222

Database references
SIMBAD	data
Exoplanet Archive	data

LP 791-18 (TOI-736) is a cool red dwarf star in the constellation Crater, located 86.92 light-years (26.65 parsecs) away from Earth. The star is one of the smallest known stars to host exoplanets. In 2019 two exoplanets in transit around it were announced by TESS, and a third planet was discovered in Spitzer Space Telescope data in 2023.

== Planetary system ==
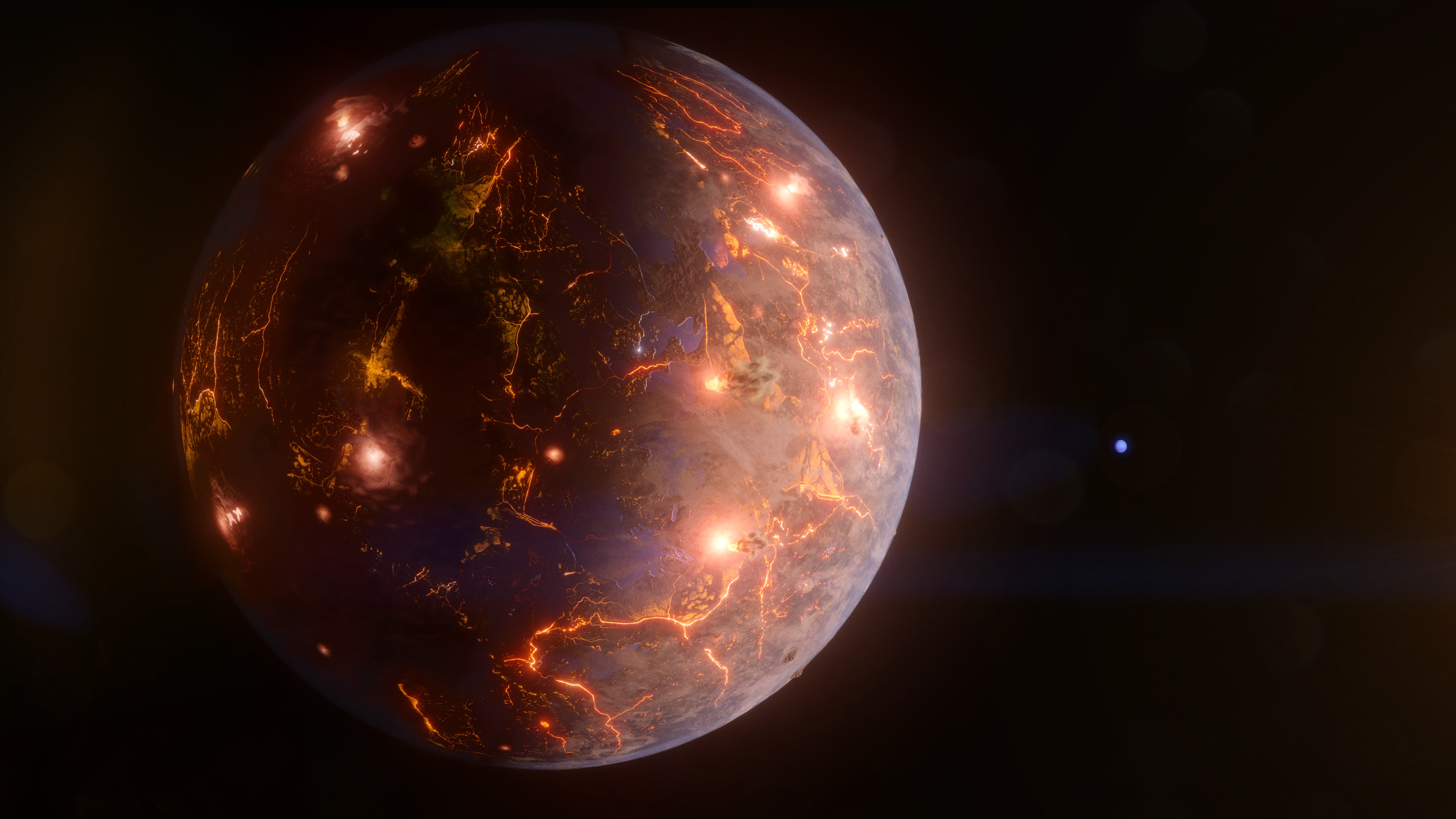
Artist's impression of LP 791-18 d, with c in the background

The innermost planet, b, is a super-Earth and the outermost planet, c, is a sub-Neptune. They were discovered together in 2019. The middle planet, d, is an Earth-mass world discovered in 2023. It may potentially be tidally heated by interactions with planet c, which would lead to abundant volcanoes similar to Jupiter's moon Io. As the planet d is in the inner edge of the habitable zone, liquid water could condense on the side of the planet that faces away from the host star.

In 2021 planet c was suggested for atmospheric analysis by the James Webb Space Telescope (JWST). In 2025, by using JWST the atmosphere of planet c was found to be rich in haze and methane (CH_{4}) but without clear evidence for carbon dioxide (CO_{2}), which is unlike that of other temperate sub-Neptune planets including K2-18b and TOI-270d.

The LP 791-18 planetary system (Note: Planet b: Peterson et al. (2021) Semi-major axes: Peterson et al. (2021) Planet c: Greklek-McKeon et al. (2025) Planet d's mass and eccentricity: Greklek-McKeon et al. (2025); miscellaneous properties from Peterson et al. (2021).)
Companion (in order from star)	Mass	Semimajor axis (AU)	Orbital period (days)	Eccentricity	Inclination (°)	Radius
b	—	0.00978±0.00012	0.9479981±0.0000021	—	88.37^{+0.94}_{−0.95}	1.212^{+0.059}_{−0.058} R_{🜨}
d	0.91±0.19 M_{🜨}	0.01992±0.00014	2.753436±0.000013	0.0011^{+0.0010}_{−0.0008}	89.34±0.41	1.032^{+0.044}_{−0.043} R_{🜨}
c	7.16±0.65 M_{🜨}	0.02961^{+0.00035}_{−0.00036}	4.9899100^{+0.0000012}_{−0.0000014}	0.0001±0.0001	89.94±0.05	2.488±0.096 R_{🜨}
