= Small planet radius gap =

Scarcity of planets between 1.5 times and twice Earth's radius

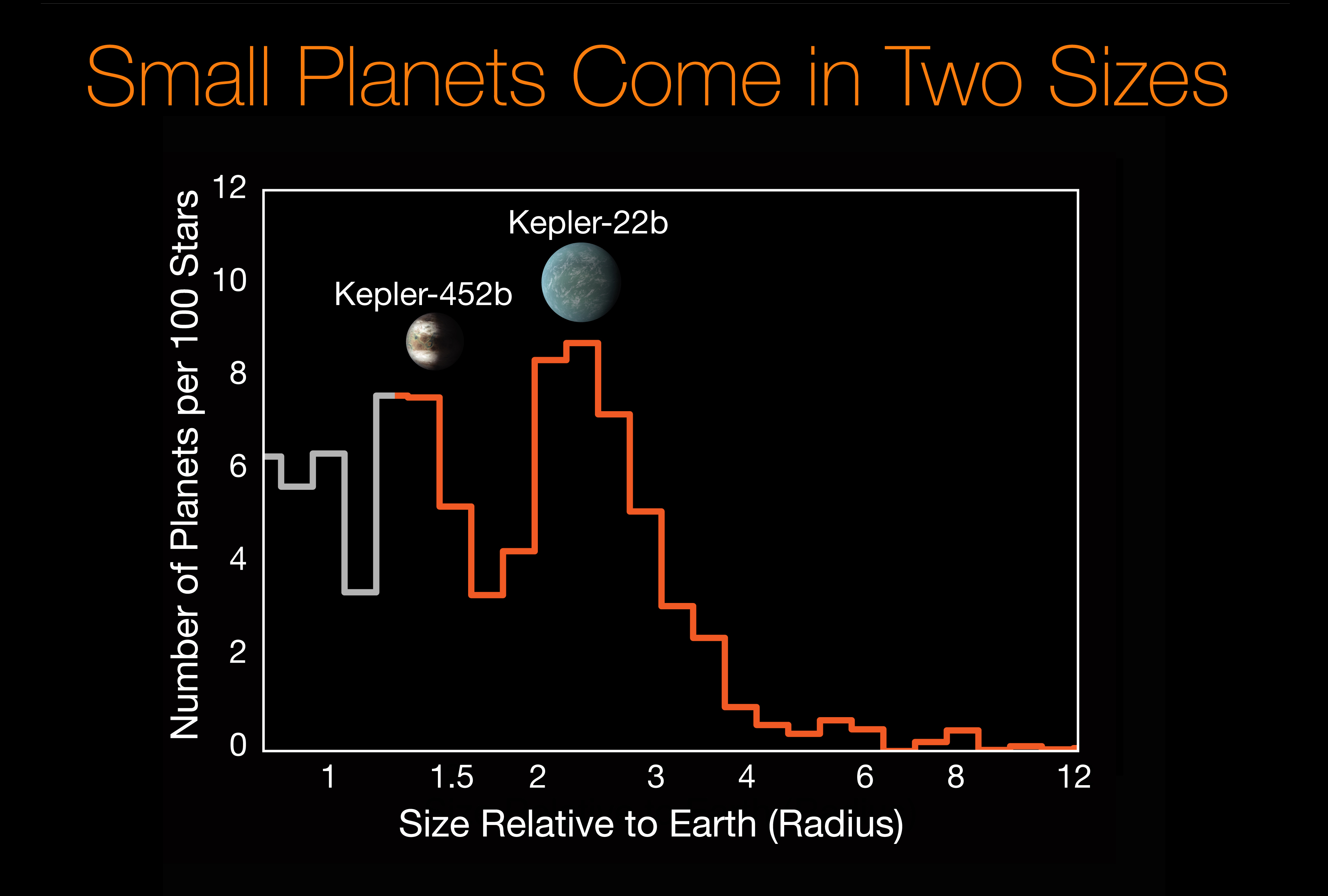
This plot illustrates the radius 'gap'

The small planet radius gap (also called the radius valley, Fulton gap, photoevaporation valley, or Sub-Neptune Desert) is an observed scarcity of planets with radii between 1.5 and 2 times Earth's radius, likely due to either photoevaporation-driven mass loss or core-powered mass loss. A bimodality in the Kepler exoplanet population was first observed in 2011 and attributed to the absence of significant gas atmospheres on close-in, low-mass planets. This feature was noted as possibly confirming an emerging hypothesis that photoevaporation could drive atmospheric mass loss. This would lead to a population of bare, rocky cores with smaller radii at small separations from their parent stars, and planets with thick hydrogen- and helium-dominated envelopes with larger radii at larger separations. The bimodality in the distribution was confirmed with higher-precision data in the California-Kepler Survey in 2017, which was shown to match the predictions of the photoevaporative mass-loss hypothesis later that year.

Despite the implication of the word 'gap', the Fulton gap does not actually represent a range of radii completely absent from the observed exoplanet population, but rather a range of radii that appear to be relatively uncommon. As a result, 'valley' is often used in place of 'gap'. The specific term "Fulton gap" is named for Benjamin J. Fulton, whose doctoral thesis included precision radius measurements that confirmed the scarcity of planets between 1.5 and 2 Earth radii, for which he won the Robert J. Trumpler Award, although the existence of this radius gap had been noted along with its underlying mechanisms as early as 2011, 2012 and 2013.

Within the photoevaporation model of Owen and Wu, the radius gap arises as planets with H/He atmospheres that double the core's radius are the most stable to atmospheric mass-loss. Planets with atmospheres larger than this are vulnerable to erosion and their atmospheres evolve towards a size that doubles the core's radius. Planets with smaller atmospheres undergo runaway loss, leaving them with no H/He dominated atmosphere.

The radius valley occurs around FGK stars and early M dwarfs but disappears around the coolest mid to late M dwarfs and is replaced by a unimodal planet radius distribution peaking at 1.25 Earth radii.

== Other possible explanations ==
- Runaway gas accretion by larger planets.
- Observational bias favoring easier detection of hot ocean planets with extended steam atmospheres.

== See also ==
- Atmospheric escape
- Earth analog
- Exoplanet
- Formation and evolution of the Solar System
- Kepler space telescope
- Photoevaporation
- Planetary science
- Super-Earth
- Mini-Neptune
