= HD 221416 b =

Gas giant exoplanet orbiting HD 221416

Discovery
- Discovery date: 2019
- Detection method: Transit

Orbital characteristics
- Semi-major axis: 0.1228
- Eccentricity: 0.115
- Orbital period (sidereal): 14.3 days
- Star: HD 221416

Physical characteristics
- Mean radius: 0.836 Jupiters
- Mass: 0.19 Jupiters

HD 221416 b is a confirmed hot-Saturn-type exoplanet 312 light years away from earth and orbiting the late subgiant K-type star, HD 221416. It is part of a small but growing number of discovered exoplanets orbiting evolved stars. This planet was discovered in 2019 by using the primary transit method.

== Physical characteristics ==
The exoplanet orbits the star at a close distance of 0.1228 AU, an eccentricity of 0.115 and an inclination of 85.75°.

== Orbital characteristics ==
The planet orbits HD 221416 at a distance of 0.1228 astronomical units with an orbital eccentricity of 0.115 and an orbital inclination of 85.75000. The planet orbits the star every 14.3 days (0.04 earth years).
