= Qatar-8 =

G0V-type star

Observation data Epoch J2000.0 Equinox ICRS
- Constellation: Ursa Major
- Right ascension: 10^{h} 29^{m} 39.11^{s}
- Declination: +70° 31′ 37.7″
- Apparent magnitude (V): 11.71±0.12

Characteristics
- Evolutionary stage: main-sequence star
- Spectral type: G0V
- Variable type: planetary transit

Astrometry
| Radial velocity (R_{v}) | 5.06±0.32 km/s |
| Proper motion (μ) | RA: −46.527±0.050 mas/yr Dec.: −9.597±0.047 mas/yr |
| Parallax (π) | 3.528±0.0321 mas |
| Distance | 924 ± 8 ly (283 ± 3 pc) |

Details
| Mass | 1.029 M_{☉} |
| Radius | 1.315 R_{☉} |
| Luminosity | 1.69 L_{☉} |
| Surface gravity (log g) | 4.214 cgs |
| Temperature | 5,738 K |
| Metallicity [Fe/H] | 0.025 dex |
| Rotational velocity (v sin i) | 2.7 km/s |
| Age | 8.3±2.1 Gyr |

Other designations
- 2MASS J10293910+7031378, Gaia DR2 1076515002779544960

Database references
| SIMBAD | data |
| Exoplanet Archive | data |

Qatar-8 is a faint solar analog located in the northern circumpolar constellation Ursa Major. With an apparent magnitude of 11.71, it is impossible to detect with the naked eye, but can be located with a powerful telescope. Qatar-8 is currently 924 light-years (283 parsecs) away from the Solar System, but is drifting further away, with a radial velocity of 5.06 km/s.

== Properties ==
Qatar-8 is a relatively old star, with an age of 8.3 billion years. At this rate, it is on the final stages of the main sequence. It has a similar effective temperature to the Sun at 5,738 K. Despite that, it has a 69% greater luminosity than the Sun. Qatar-8 has a radius 31.5% greater than the Sun, and has a similar metallicity to the Sun despite its age.

== Planetary system ==
In 2019, the Qatar Exoplanet Survey (QES) discovered planets around Qatar-9, itself, and Qatar-10. However, Qatar-8b is a puffy Hot Saturn unlike the other planets discovered.

The Qatar-8 planetary system
| Companion (in order from star) | Mass | Semimajor axis (AU) | Orbital period (days) | Eccentricity | Inclination (°) | Radius |
|---|---|---|---|---|---|---|
| b | 0.371 M_{J} | 0.0474 | 3.719 | 0 | 89.29 | 1.285 R_{J} |

Since Qatar-8b is a puffy planet, it only has 37.1% the mass of Jupiter. Due to that, it puffs up to a radius that is 28.5% larger than the latter's. It also has an effective temperature of 1,457 K. Qatar-8b is ten times closer to its star than Mercury is to the Sun, which corresponds to a typical four-day orbit.

Qatar-8b
Discovery
- Discovery date: 2019
- Detection method: Transit

Orbital characteristics
- Semi-major axis: 0.0474 AU
- Eccentricity: 0
- Orbital period (sidereal): 3.714 days
- Semi-amplitude: 47.7 ± 8.0 ms -1

Physical characteristics
- Mean radius: 1.285 R_{J}
- Mass: 0.371 M_{J}
- Mean density: 0.216 g cm−3

== Companion ==
Qatar-8 was suspected to have a stellar companion, which makes it a binary star. However, a study in 2020 after analysis of many other stars show no stellar companion at all.
