= TOI-270 =

Red dwarf star in the constellation Pictor

Observation data Epoch J2000 Equinox ICRS
- Constellation: Pictor
- Right ascension: 04^{h} 33^{m} 39.72001^{s}
- Declination: −51° 57′ 22.4354″
- Apparent magnitude (V): 12.617

Characteristics
- Evolutionary stage: Main sequence
- Spectral type: M3.0V
- Apparent magnitude (V): 12.617±0.03
- Apparent magnitude (R): 12.147±0.05
- Apparent magnitude (G): 11.621±0.003
- Apparent magnitude (J): 9.099±0.032
- Apparent magnitude (H): 8.531±0.073
- Apparent magnitude (K): 8.251±0.029

Astrometry
Radial velocity (R_{v})	25.90±0.37 km/s
Proper motion (μ)	RA: +83.082 mas/yr Dec.: −269.803 mas/yr
Parallax (π)	44.4899±0.0147 mas
Distance	73.31 ± 0.02 ly (22.477 ± 0.007 pc)

Details
Mass	0.386±0.008 M_{☉}
Radius	0.378±0.011 R_{☉}
Luminosity (bolometric)	0.0194±0.0019 L_{☉}
Surface gravity (log g)	4.872±0.026 cgs
Temperature	3506±70 K
Metallicity [Fe/H]	−0.20±0.12 dex

Other designations
- L 231-32, PM J04336-5157, TOI-270, TIC 259377017, 2MASS J04333970-5157222

Database references
SIMBAD	data
Exoplanet Archive	data

TOI-270 (also known as L 231-32) is a red dwarf star 73.3 light-years (22.5 parsecs) away in the constellation Pictor. It has about 39% the mass and 38% the radius of the Sun, and a temperature of about 3,506 K (3,233 °C; 5,851 °F). TOI-270 hosts a system of three known exoplanets.

== Planetary system ==
The three planets of TOI-270 were discovered in 2019 by the transit method with TESS. Their masses have since been measured by both Doppler spectroscopy and transit-timing variations. The innermost planet, TOI-270 b, is a potentially volatile-rich super-Earth, while the two outer planets are sub-Neptunes. TOI-270 b and c orbit near a 5:3 resonance, while TOI-270 c and d orbit near a 2:1 resonance.

Observations of the outermost planet, TOI-270 d, by the Hubble Space Telescope suggest a hydrogen-rich atmosphere with signs of water vapor. TOI-270 c & d are good targets for atmospheric detection with the James Webb Space Telescope (JWST).

It was found that TOI-270 b possibly has an atmosphere rich in water vapor based on the revised density value and JWST transmission spectroscopy result.

The TOI-270 planetary system
Companion (in order from star)	Mass	Semimajor axis (AU)	Orbital period (days)	Eccentricity	Inclination (°)	Radius
b	1.48±0.18 M_{🜨}	0.03197(22)	3.3601538(48)	0.0167(84)	89.41±0.43	1.306±0.028 R_{🜨}
c	6.20±0.31 M_{🜨}	0.04526(31)	5.6605731(31)	0.0044(6)	89.36±0.24	2.355±0.064 R_{🜨}
d	4.20±0.16 M_{🜨}	0.07210(50)	11.379573(13)	0.0066(20)	89.73±0.16	2.133±0.058 R_{🜨}

== Gallery ==
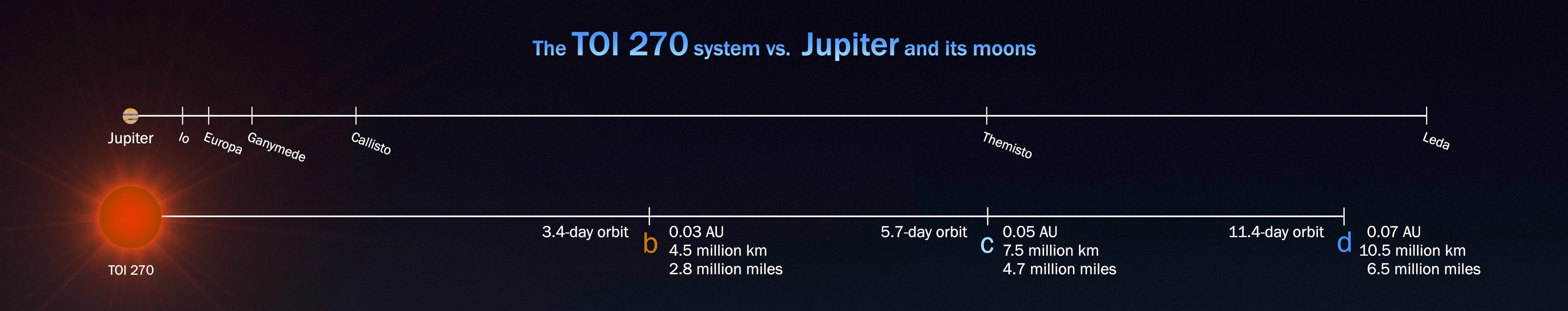
Comparison of the TOI-270 planetary system to Jupiter's moon system

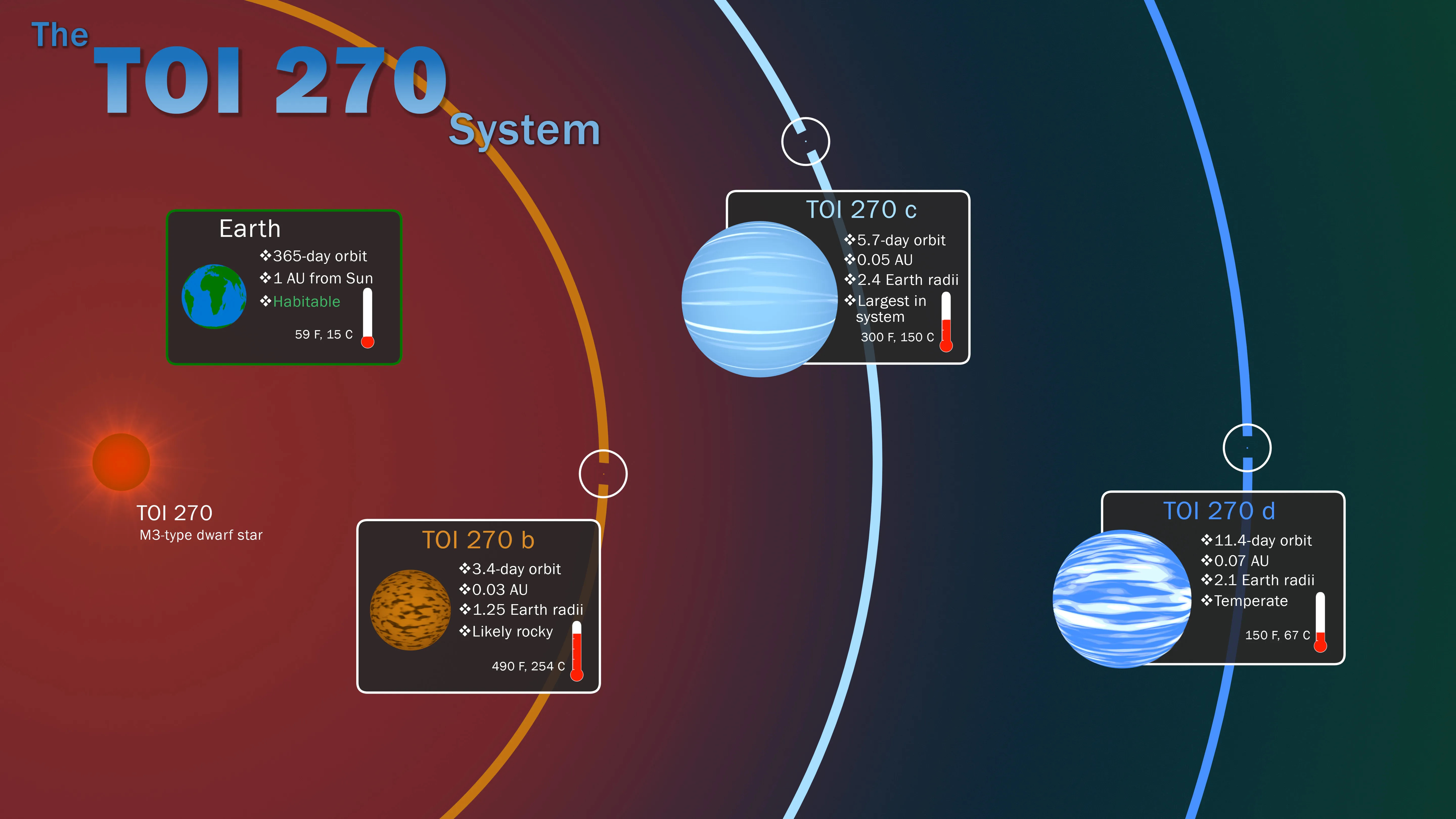
Illustration of the TOI-270 system

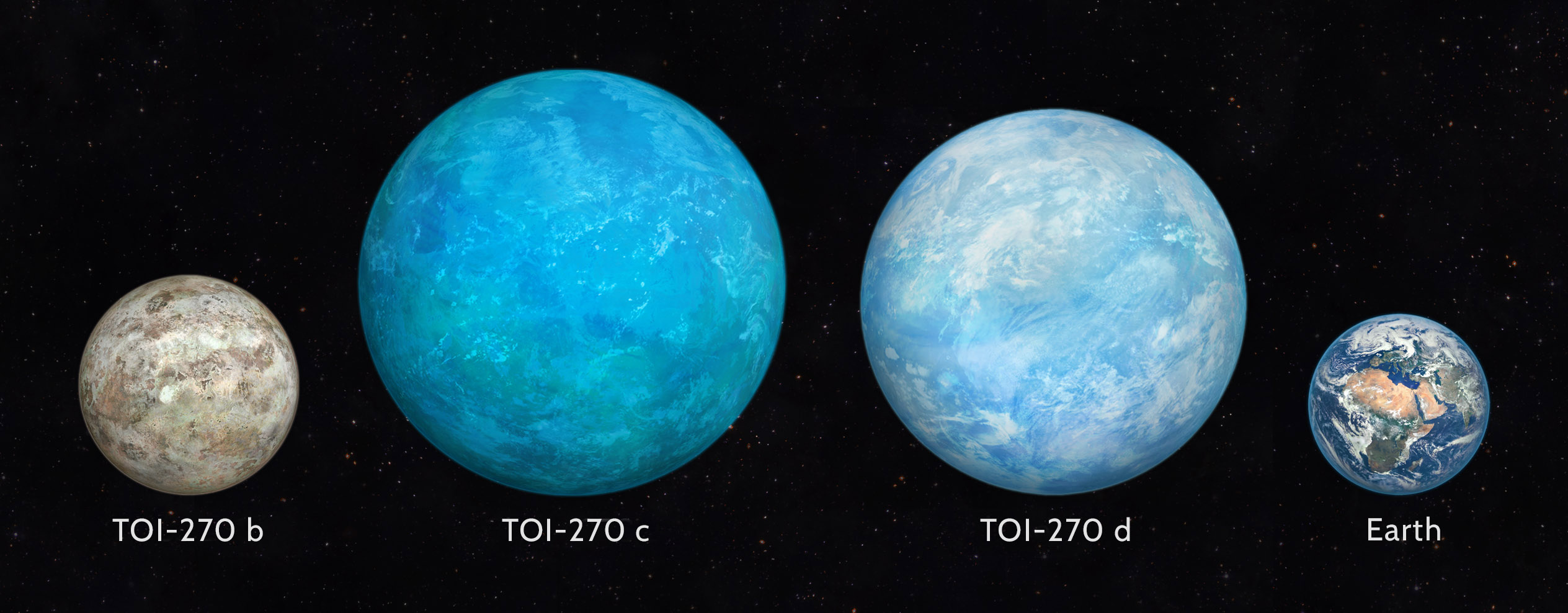
Artist's impression of the three known planets in the TOI-270 system and their size comparison with Earth

== See also ==
- List of terrestrial exoplanet candidates for atmosphere detection
- List of exoplanets discovered in 2019
