= Qatar-5b =

Exoplanet

Discovery
- Discovered by: Alsubai et al. 2019
- Detection method: Transit

Orbital characteristics
- Semi-major axis: 0.04127 ± 0.00067 au
- Eccentricity: 0
- Orbital period (sidereal): 2.8792319 d
- Inclination: 88.74 ± 0.87°
- Semi-amplitude: 568 ± 15 m/s

Physical characteristics
- Mean radius: 1.107 ± 0.064 R_{J}
- Mass: 4.32 ± 0.18 M_{J}
- Mean density: 3.95 ± 0.58 g cm^{−3}
- Temperature: 1,415 ± 31 K

Qatar-5b is a hot Jupiter orbiting the star Qatar-5 located in the constellation Andromeda. It orbits its star every 2.87 days. It was discovered in 2016 by the Qatar Exoplanet Survey (QES).
