= K2-296b =

Exoplanet

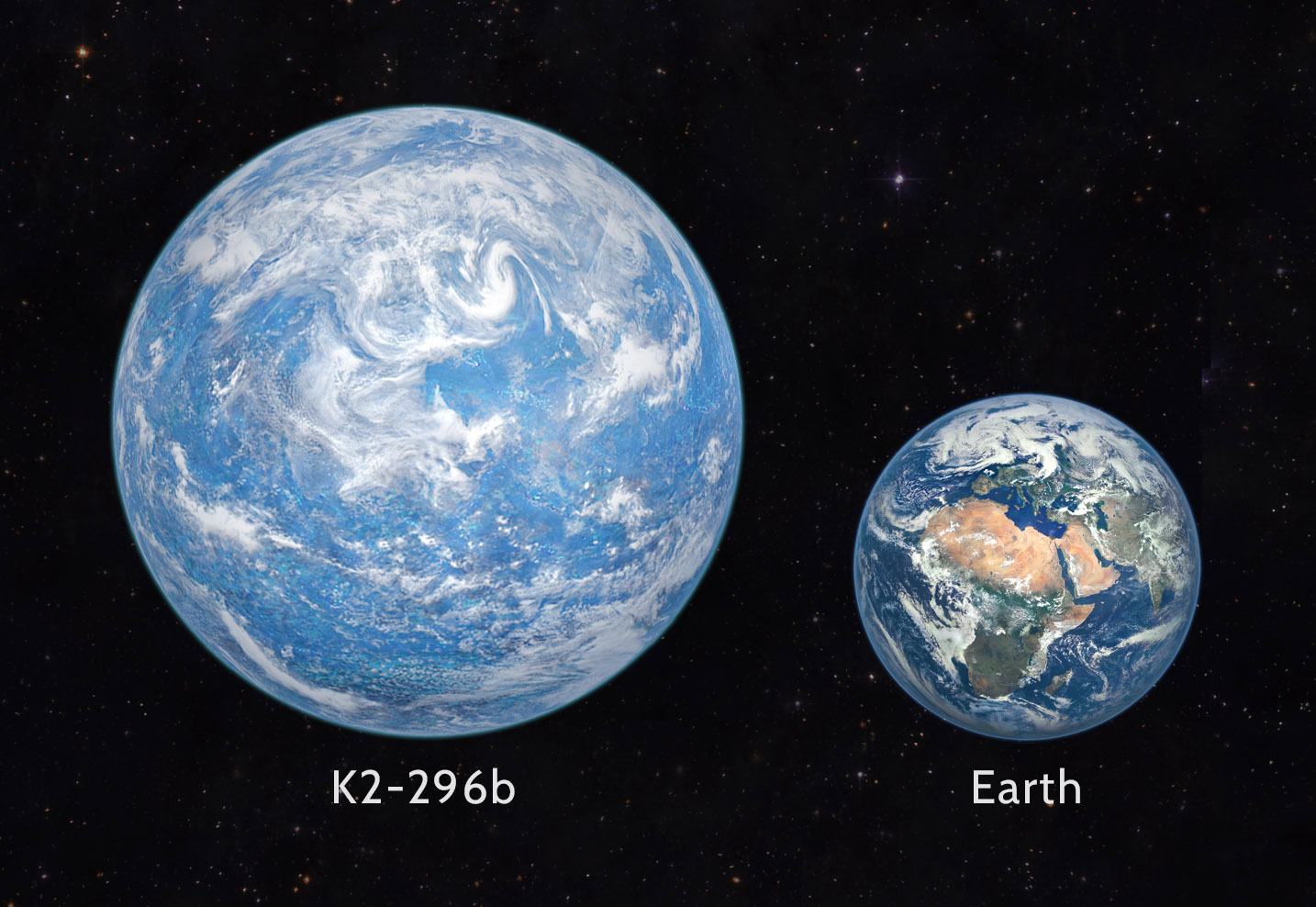
- Size comparison of the planet K2-296b (artistic concept) with Earth

Discovery
- Discovered by: René Heller et al.
- Discovery date: 2019
- Detection method: Transit method

Designations
- Alternative names: EPIC 201238110 b, TIC 35019000 b, UCAC4 434-056021 b

Orbital characteristics
- Semi-major axis: 0.135
- Orbital period (sidereal): 28.1696+0.0043 −0.0038
- Inclination: 89.8°
- Star: EPIC 201238110

Physical characteristics
- Mean radius: 0.167+0.018 −0.04 R_{J}
- Mass: ~4.2 M_{🜨}
- Temperature: 277 K (4 °C; 39 °F, equilibrium)

K2-296b (more commonly referred to as EPIC 201238110 b) is a potentially habitable planet discovered by Heller et al. in 2019, orbiting the M-dwarf star EPIC 201238110.

== Habitability ==
K2-296b's orbit, which has a semi-major axis of 0.135 AU (20,200,000 km), is located in the habitable zone of the planetary system, meaning liquid water could exist on its surface. Its equilibrium temperature is estimated at 277 K (4 °C; 39 °F). The planet is likely tidally locked to its parent star. The Habitable Worlds Catalog, issued by the Planetary Habitability Laboratory, classes the planet as a warm superterran, near the inner edge of the optimistic habitable zone.

== Host star ==
The host star, EPIC 201238110, is a red dwarf with a mass of 0.41 M_{☉} and a radius of 0.37 R_{☉}. It has a surface temperature of 3588 K or 3772 K, and a luminosity of 0.0254 L_{☉}. There is another transiting candidate planet in the system called EPIC 201238110 c, which, if confirmed, would be a hot (427 K) mini-Neptune with a radius of 2.76 R_{🜨} and a mass of 8.0 M_{🜨}, revolving around the star once every 7.9 days at a distance of 0.058 AU (8,700,000 km).
