= Kepler-411 =

Binary star system in the constellation Cygnus

Observation data Epoch J2000 Equinox ICRS
- Constellation: Cygnus
- Right ascension: 19^{h} 10^{m} 25.34699^{s}
- Declination: +49° 31′ 23.7126″
- Apparent magnitude (V): 12.55

Characteristics

Kepler-411A
- Evolutionary stage: main sequence
- Spectral type: K3V

Astrometry

Kepler-411A
Radial velocity (R_{v})	−20.40±0.77 km/s
Proper motion (μ)	RA: 13.611 mas/yr Dec.: 32.543 mas/yr
Parallax (π)	6.5313±0.0080 mas
Distance	499.4 ± 0.6 ly (153.1 ± 0.2 pc)

Kepler-411B
Proper motion (μ)	RA: 13.263 mas/yr Dec.: 33.008 mas/yr
Parallax (π)	6.5727±0.0573 mas
Distance	496 ± 4 ly (152 ± 1 pc)

Position (relative to Kepler-411A)
Component	Kepler-411B
Epoch of observation	2012
Angular distance	3.4±0.06″
Position angle	331±3°
Projected separation	520 AU

Details

Kepler-411A
Mass	0.75 M_{☉}
Radius	0.76 R_{☉}
Luminosity	0.27 L_{☉}
Surface gravity (log g)	4.58 cgs
Temperature	4,773 K
Metallicity [Fe/H]	0.11±0.1 dex
Rotation	10.52 d
Age	0.212±0.031 Gyr

Kepler-411B
Mass	0.33 M_{☉}
Radius	0.49 R_{☉}
Temperature	3,446 K

Other designations
- Kepler-411A: KOI-1781, KIC 11551692, 2MASS J19102533+4931237
- Kepler-411B: Gaia DR3 2132768956904826624

Database references
SIMBAD	data
- B
Exoplanet Archive	data

Kepler-411 is a binary star system. Its primary star Kepler-411A is a K-type main-sequence star, orbited by the red dwarf star Kepler-411B on a wide orbit, discovered in 2012.

== Primary star ==
The primary star's surface temperature is 4,773 K. Kepler-411A is similar to the Sun in its concentration of heavy elements, with a metallicity Fe/H index of 0.11±0.1, but is much younger at an age of 212±31 million years.

Kepler-411A exhibits significant starspot activity, with starspots covering 1.7^{+0.3}_{−0.2}% of the stellar surface. Darker starspots are concentrated around the equator of the star. Kepler-411A exhibits differential rotation, but with smaller amount of differential shear compared to the Sun.

The companion Kepler-411B is 533 au away from Kepler-411A. It is a red dwarf and a flare star.

== Planetary system ==
In 2013, one planet, named Kepler-411b, was discovered, followed by planet Kepler-411c in 2016. Third planet in system detected by transit method, d, along with e detected by radial velocity method, were discovered in 2019.

The Kepler-411 planetary system
Companion (in order from star)	Mass	Semimajor axis (AU)	Orbital period (days)	Eccentricity	Inclination (°)	Radius
b	0.08055±0.00818 M_{J}	0.0375±0.0008	3.005156±0.000002	0.146^{+0.004}_{−0.005}	87.4±0.1	0.214±0.005 R_{J}
c	0.08306±0.01856 M_{J}	0.0739±0.001	7.834436247±0.000001137	0.108^{+0.003}_{−0.004}	88.61±0.04	0.394±0.006 R_{J}
e	0.03398±0.00346 M_{J}	0.186±0.003	31.509728±0.000085	0.016^{+0.002}_{−0.001}	88.04±0.02	—
d	0.04782±0.01605 M_{J}	0.279±0.004	58.02023116±0.00004203	0.128±0.003	89.43±0.02	0.296±0.009 R_{J}
