= HD 85628 Ab =

Exoplanet orbiting HD 85628 A

Discovery
- Discovered by: MASCARA
- Discovery date: 2019
- Detection method: transit

Orbital characteristics
- Semi-major axis: 0.047
- Eccentricity: 0
- Orbital period (sidereal): 2.8 d
- Inclination: 88.81
- Star: HD 85628 A

Physical characteristics
- Mean radius: 1.515 R_{J}
- Mass: 3.1 M_{J}

HD 85628 Ab, also designed MASCARA-4b, is an exoplanet located approximately 559.47±3.05 light years from Earth. This planet was discovered in 2019 using the transit method.

== Characteristics ==
It is a hot Jupiter on a retrograde and slightly eccentric orbit. The planet is unusually reflective for a hot Jupiter. Hydrogen, sodium, magnesium, calcium and iron emission from planetary atmosphere was detected.

== Host star ==
The host star, HD 85628 A, is the primary star of a binary star system, HD 85628. The secondary star is HD 85628 B, an M-type star.

== See also ==
- Henry Draper Catalogue
- MASCARA
