= Qatar-2 =

Star in the constellation Virgo

Observation data Epoch J2000 Equinox ICRS
- Constellation: Virgo
- Right ascension: 13^{h} 50^{m} 37.4100^{s}
- Declination: −06° 48′ 14.422″
- Apparent magnitude (V): 13.3

Characteristics
- Evolutionary stage: main sequence
- Spectral type: K5V

Astrometry
Radial velocity (R_{v})	−23.55 km/s
Proper motion (μ)	RA: −88.171 mas/yr Dec.: −15.187 mas/yr
Parallax (π)	5.4023±0.0195 mas
Distance	604 ± 2 ly (185.1 ± 0.7 pc)

Details
Mass	0.727±0.024 M_{☉}
Radius	0.7033±0.0080 R_{☉}
Surface gravity (log g)	4.601±0.018 cgs
Temperature	4,645±50 K
Metallicity [Fe/H]	0.13±0.1 dex
Rotation	18.0±0.2
Rotational velocity (v sin i)	2.0±0.2 km/s
Age	9 Gyr

Other designations
- GSC 04974-00112, 2MASS J13503740-0648145, Gaia DR2 3620030644476623616

Database references
SIMBAD	data

Qatar-2 is a K-type main-sequence star about 595 light-years away in the constellation of Virgo. The star is much older than the Sun, and has a concentration of heavy elements similar to solar abundance. The star has numerous and long-lived starspots, and belongs to a peculiar variety of inflated K-dwarfs with strong magnetic activity inhibiting internal convection.

== Planetary system ==
In 2011 a transiting superjovian planet Qatar-2b was detected by the Qatar Exoplanet Survey. The planet has a large measured temperature difference between dayside 1,368±32 K and nightside 724±135 K. The planetary orbit is well aligned with the equatorial plane of the star, misalignment angle equal to 4.3°±4.5°. No orbital decay was detected. The color of planetary atmosphere is blue due to Rayleigh scattering of light, and albedo is very low, being below 0.06.

An additional massive companion on wide orbit was suspected in 2011, but search utilizing transit-timing variation method has yielded zero results in 2017.

The Qatar-2 planetary system
Companion (in order from star)	Mass	Semimajor axis (AU)	Orbital period (days)	Eccentricity	Inclination (°)	Radius
b	2.466±0.062 M_{J}	0.02136±0.00024	1.33711677±0.00000010	0	88.99±0.20	1.115±0.013 R_{J}
