= Qatar-1 =

Star in the constellation Draco

Observation data Epoch J2000 Equinox ICRS
- Constellation: Draco
- Right ascension: 20^{h} 13^{m} 31.6176^{s}
- Declination: 65° 09′ 43.4909″
- Apparent magnitude (V): 12.84

Characteristics
- Evolutionary stage: main sequence star
- Spectral type: K3V
- B−V color index: 1.06
- V−R color index: 0.19
- J−H color index: 0.472
- J−K color index: 0.590
- Variable type: planetary transit variable

Astrometry
Radial velocity (R_{v})	-37.835±0.063 km/s
Proper motion (μ)	RA: 12.636±0.048 mas/yr Dec.: 58.170±0.041 mas/yr
Parallax (π)	5.3587±0.0231 mas
Distance	609 ± 3 ly (186.6 ± 0.8 pc)

Details
Mass	0.85±0.03 M_{☉}
Radius	0.823±0.025 R_{☉}
Surface gravity (log g)	4.536±0.024 cgs
Temperature	4861±125 K
Metallicity [Fe/H]	0.2±0.1 dex
Rotational velocity (v sin i)	1.7±0.3 km/s
Age	4.5 Gyr

Other designations
- Qatar-1, 2MASS J20133160+6509433, Gaia DR2 2244830490514284928, V592 Dra

Database references
SIMBAD	data

Qatar-1 is an orange main sequence star in the constellation of Draco.

== Star characteristics ==
Qatar-1 has an average to high metallicity of 160% of solar, and is of similar age to Sun. The star has significant starspot activity.

== Planetary system ==
The "Hot Jupiter" class planet Qatar-1b was discovered by the Qatar Exoplanet Survey in 2010. The planetary orbit is likely aligned with the rotational axis of the star, with the misalignment measurement based on the Rossiter-McLaughlin effect equal to −8.4±7.1 degrees. The planet has a large measured temperature difference between dayside (1696±39 K) and nightside (1098±158 K). A spectroscopic study in 2017 does suggest that Qatar-1b has relatively clear skies with a few clouds.

Additional planets or a brown dwarf in the system were suspected in 2013, but were refuted in 2015.

The transit-timing variation search in 2020 has also resulted in no detection of additional planets in the system, although by 2022 additional transit-timing variation data have suggested the planetary system is accelerating under influence of the unseen long-period companion.

The Qatar-1 planetary system
Companion (in order from star)	Mass	Semimajor axis (AU)	Orbital period (days)	Eccentricity	Inclination (°)	Radius
b	1.33±0.05 M_{J}	0.02343±0.0012	1.4200236±0.0000001	0.020^{+0.011}_{−0.01}	84.23±0.06	1.19±0.09 R_{J}
