= Qatar-4b =

Super-Jupiter orbiting Qatar-4

Discovery
- Discovered by: Alsubai et al. 2019
- Detection method: Transit

Orbital characteristics
- Semi-major axis: 0.02803 ± 0.00048 au
- Eccentricity: 0
- Orbital period (sidereal): 1.8053564 d
- Inclination: 87.5 ± 1.6°
- Semi-amplitude: 957±16 m/s

Physical characteristics
- Mean radius: 1.135 ± 0.11 R_{J}
- Mass: 5.36 ± 0.20 M_{J}
- Temperature: 1385 ± 50 K

Qatar-4b is a super-jupiter orbiting the star Qatar-4 every 1.8 days. It was discovered in 2016 by the Qatar Exoplanet Survey (QES).

This planet has a very short orbit, with only 1.8 days for it to complete an orbit around Qatar-4. The period corresponds with a separation of around 0.03 AU, which is almost 20 times closer than Mercury is to the Sun. Despite that, it has a perfectly round orbit. Since the host is an active star, Qatar-4 may be destroyed by tidal waves from the star.

Qatar-4b has over five times the mass of Jupiter. Despite this, it has a radius that is only 13.5% larger than the latter's. This planet has an effective temperature of 1,385 K, which classifies it as a hot Jupiter, and is denser than Jupiter, with about 4 times the density.
