= Sub-Neptune =

Planet smaller than Neptune with a low density envelope

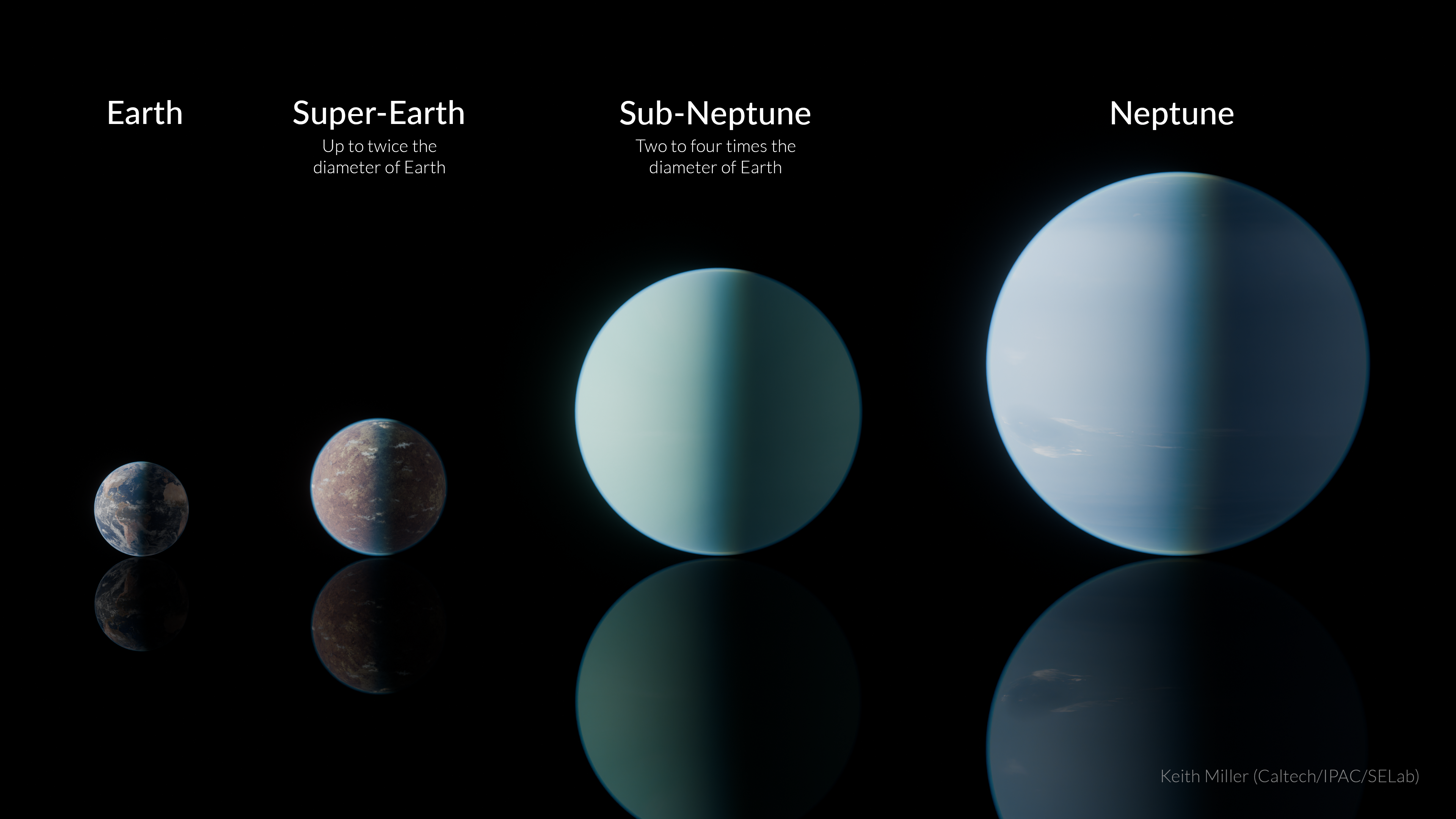
Size comparison of a typical super-Earth (middle left) and sub-Neptune (middle right) compared to Earth and Neptune. Super-Earths and sub-Neptunes are the most common types of exoplanet.

A sub-Neptune, also known as a mini-Neptune, is a type of exoplanet smaller in radius than Neptune, but larger than the small planet radius gap. Based on their low bulk densities, these planets likely possess a low density envelope surrounding a rocky core. Despite being one of the most numerous types of exoplanets discovered as of 2026, no sub-Neptune is known to exist in the Solar System.

The exact nature of sub-Neptunes is uncertain. It is debated whether they are "gas dwarfs" with a gas envelope of hydrogen and helium over a rocky core, "water worlds" with large amounts of volatiles such as water, or smaller versions of ice giants with both gas and volatiles. In order to discern between these scenarios, several sub-Neptunes such as GJ 1214 b and K2-18 b have been observed by telescopes such as the Hubble Space Telescope and the James Webb Space Telescope in order to infer their compositions and formation histories.

== Terminology ==
The terms "sub-Neptune" and "mini-Neptune" are used inconsistently in literature. Many research papers use either term to refer to the small planet population located above the radius gap, possessing a low density envelope, in contrast to super-Earths, which are smaller and lack an envelope. Other terms used to refer to this planet population include "gas dwarf", which now usually specifically means water-poor sub-Neptunes, and "small Neptune".

"Sub-Neptune" is occasionally used to collectively refer to any planet between 1–4 Earth radii, including super-Earths and mini-Neptunes. This population is also known as "small planets", or "Kepler planets". "Mini-Neptune" is sometimes used to refer to specific subsets of sub-Neptunes. The term has been used to describe sub-Neptunes with a massive hydrogen atmosphere and no defined surface or water-rich sub-Neptunes.

== Occurrence ==
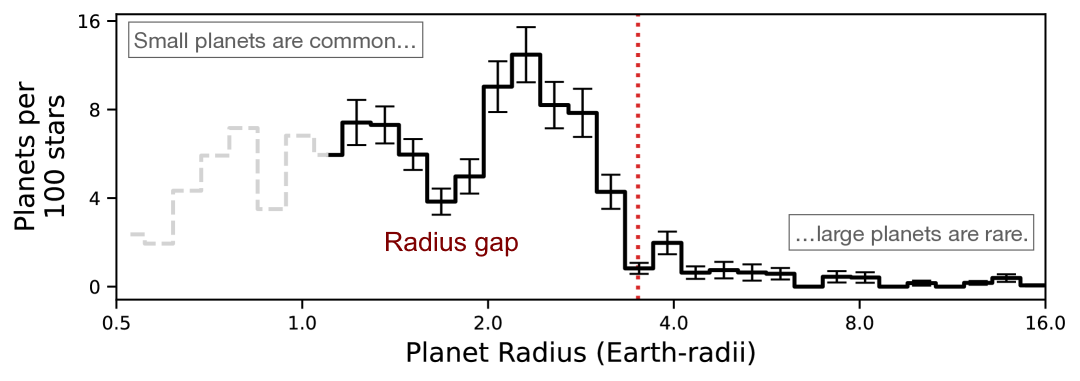
Histogram showing the occurrence rate of exoplanets versus planet radius. Exoplanets are most commonly found as sub-Neptunes, with radii between 2.0 and 3.5 Earth radii.

Sub-Neptunes occur much more frequently than giant planets in the inner planetary system. A 2013 study using data from the Kepler space telescope found that planets between 2–4 Earth radii orbiting within 245 days can be found around 31% of sun-like stars, while less than ten percent of such stars host larger planets orbiting within 418 days. Subsequent works show that their occurrence increases with orbital period until around 12–13 days, where the occurrence rate flattens out. Microlensing surveys, which are sensitive to planets located at large orbital separations, indicate that long period sub-Neptunes and super-Earths may also be common.

Short period sub-Neptunes are common around G-type and K-type stars, and their occurrence peaks around early M-type stars. Their occurrence decreases around stars hotter than the Sun, as well as around cooler stars. Sub-Neptunes are rare around mid-to-late M dwarfs less massive than around 0.4 solar masses, with an occurrence rate of 0.148 ± 0.045 planets orbiting within 30 days per star, while super-Earth-size planets remain much more common.

Sub-Neptune occurrence weakly correlates with the host star's metallicity, unlike larger giant planets.

In addition to a broad suppression in small planet occurrence, stellar companions with separations of less than around 100 au suppress the occurrence rate of sub-Neptunes.

== Characteristics ==
=== Orbit ===
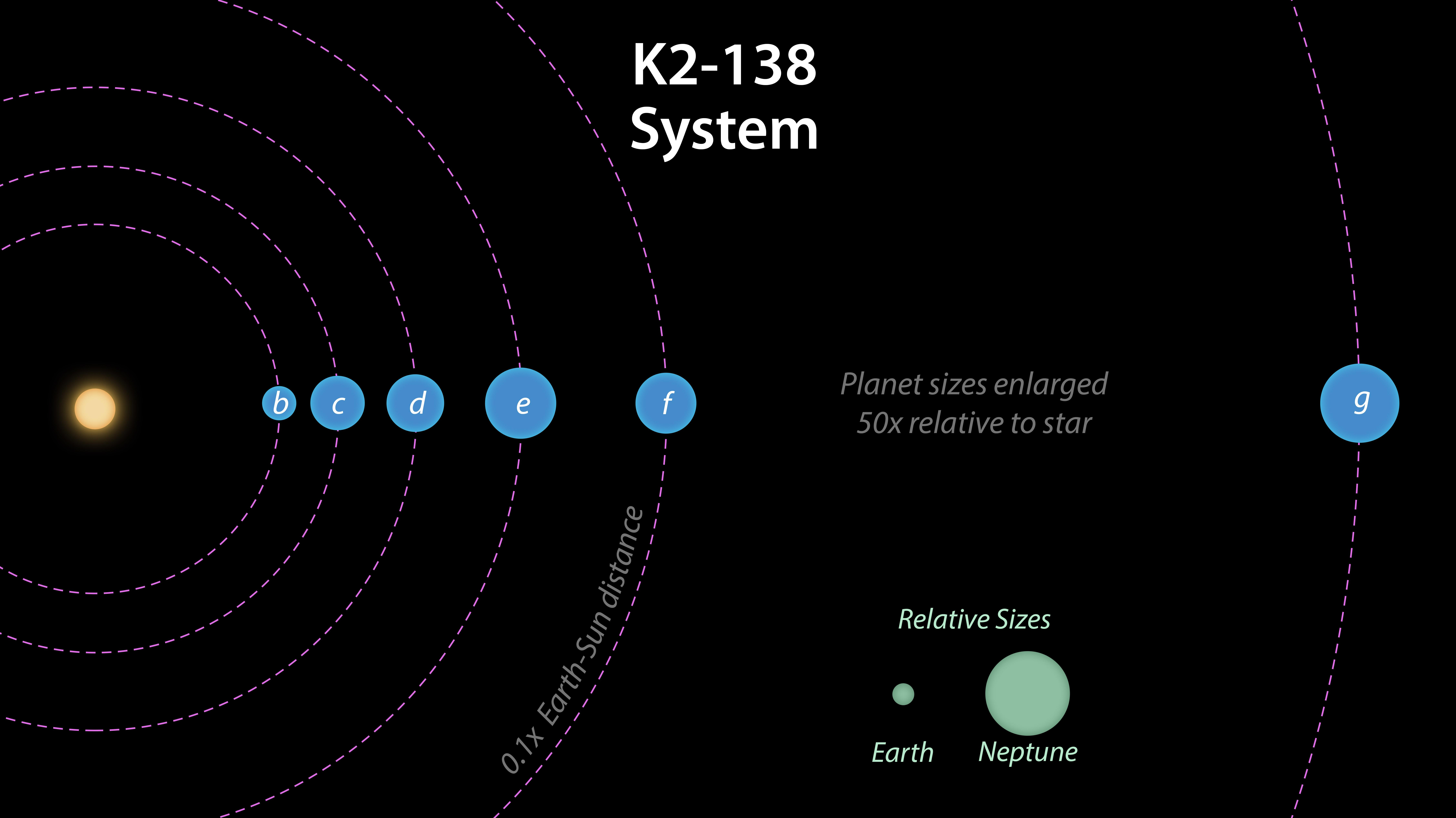
Diagram of the K2-138 planetary system, which consists of six sub-Neptunes tightly packed together in resonant orbits.

Sub-Neptunes are frequently found with other sub-Neptunes (or super-Earths). They tend to have similar sizes as other sub-Neptunes in the system. Such systems are known as "peas in a pod" systems.

Most sub-Neptunes are not in mean motion resonance with their neighbours. However, there is an excess of sub-Neptunes near first-order resonances, especially just wide of it. Transiting sub-Neptunes near mean motion resonances, such as those orbiting Kepler-223 and HD 110067, exhibit strong transit timing variations, which allows measurements of their masses.

The sub-Neptune planet population's average eccentricity is lower than larger planets. The transition between the two populations occurs at a radius of around 3.5 Earth radii.

=== Size ===
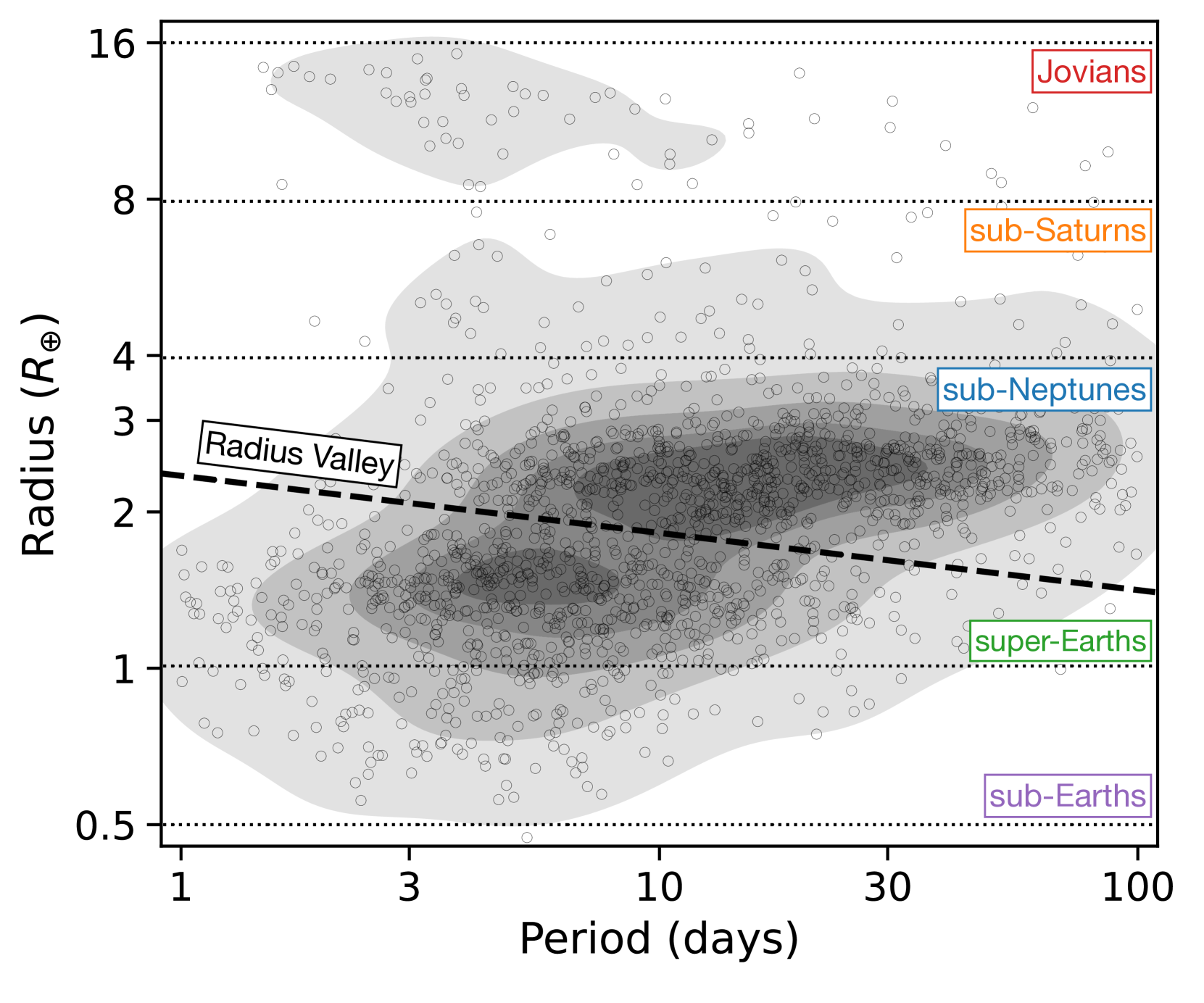
In this scatter plot of known exoplanet orbital periods and radii (data from 2025), there are two distinct clusters in radius: these are the super-Earth and sub-Neptune populations (density shaded for clarity). These two populations are separated by a radius valley, as indicated by the black dashed line.

The radius range of the main sub-Neptune population lies between the small planet radius gap, at around 1.7–1.8 Earth radii, and the radius cliff, the sudden drop in planet abundance beyond approximately 3–4 Earth radii. This definition is not rigid; some sub-Neptune-sized planets with masses exceeding Neptune's have also been referred to as sub-Neptunes, as well as planets larger but less massive than Neptune.

Young sub-Neptunes, such as the transiting sub-Neptunes orbiting Kepler-51 and V1298 Tauri, can be significantly larger than their older counterparts, some being as big as gas giants even though they are much less massive. As they age and radiate heat away, they undergo Kelvin–Helmholtz contraction, shrinking in radius until they reach typical sub-Neptune sizes.

=== Composition ===
Although the low density of sub-Neptunes is a clear evidence that these planets possess an envelope made of low density materials in addition to a rocky core, the materials that comprise this envelope is disputed.

Atmospheric escape mechanisms which best explain the small planet radius gap for planets around sun-like stars generally predict most sub-Neptune cores to have Earth-like compositions, with low to no contribution from water. The hydrogen-helium envelope makes up a few percent of the planet's mass. Measurements of young sub-Neptunes' radii tentatively corroborate this model. Some planet formation models also predict such dry sub-Neptunes.

On the other hand, some works, especially planet formation models, predict that sub-Neptunes are water-rich worlds. Such simulations predicted that sub-Neptunian planets formed beyond the water-ice line, before migrating inwards. Strong irradiation on a water-rich planet could produce an inflated steam atmosphere, consistent with observations. Some of these water-rich worlds may also possess hydrogen and helium in their envelopes. There is also a possibility that water worlds which accreted beyond the water-ice line would also accrete large amounts of refractory organic carbon, or "soot".

It is possible that sub-Neptunes around M dwarfs are different in nature from sub-Neptunes around sun-like stars, as some studies find the shape of the radius gap for planets around such stars to be consistent with it being created by planet formation processes rather than envelope loss mechanisms, unlike for sun-like stars. Others find the radius gap to be consistent with envelope loss mechanisms, however. The minimum mass for sub-Neptunes appears to increase with stellar mass, and small sub-Neptunes around M dwarfs seem to be significantly less dense than their counterparts around FGK stars.

Chemical interactions between the envelope and the core can alter a sub-Neptune's composition after its formation. Reactions between the hydrogen atmosphere and the magma ocean can produce water and other volatiles endogenously, potentially explaining the presence of volatiles found in some sub-Neptunes' atmospheres without requiring accretion of icy materials beyond the water-ice line. Water can also dissolve in magma ocean and be sequestered into the interior or converted to hydrogen, causing even sub-Neptunes which form with large amounts of water to develop a relatively water-poor envelope.

=== Internal structure ===
Sub-Neptunes are generally believed to be at least partially differentiated, featuring an interior rich in denser materials such as silicates and metals engulfed by an envelope of lighter materials such as "gas" (hydrogen and helium) and/or "ice" (volatiles such as water, methane, and carbon dioxide). However, the nature of the envelope, the degree of differentiation, and the partition of different materials across the planet are not fully understood.

Assuming that sub-Neptunes are gas dwarfs, many may be expected to have a magma ocean. This is because the core, heated by planet formation, is blanketed by the envelope, which prolongs its cooling timescale to billions of years. Some sub-Neptunes may have sufficiently high atmospheric pressure to solidify the magma ocean. However, studies on the miscibility of hydrogen, silicate, and metals at high pressures and temperatures found that under pressures relevant to sub-Neptune interiors, all three materials are miscible above temperatures of approximately 3600 Kelvin, suggesting that a sub-Neptune's interior would not differentiate into a discrete iron core and a silicate mantle, and a significant amount of hydrogen would reside within a sub-Neptune's core as well. As the planet cools, the binodal surface, which delineates regions where the two substances are miscible, recedes deeper into the interior, causing silicate to rain out and hydrogen to enter the envelope, although some hydrogen would remain in the core even after this.

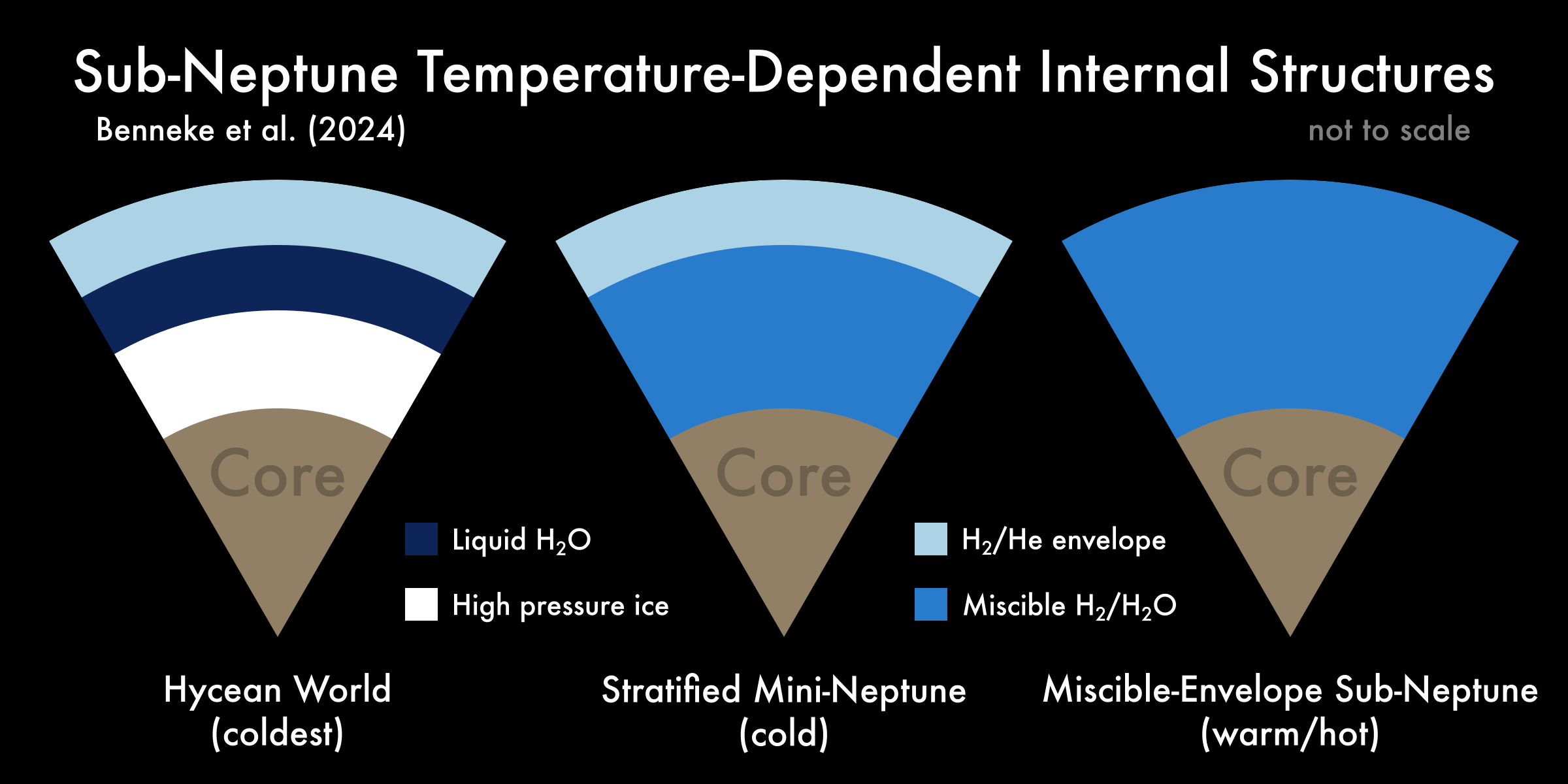
Internal structures of sub-Neptunes at various temperatures, as proposed by Benneke et al. (2024)

At high temperatures and pressures, hydrogen and water become fully miscible, and methane's solubility in water also increases. Therefore, hydrogen, water, and other volatiles within a sub-Neptune's envelope may become miscible. For warmer sub-Neptunes, the entire envelope could be fully miscible, and the composition of the observable upper atmosphere would reflect the relative abundances of hydrogen and volatiles. For colder sub-Neptunes, water could rain out of the uppermost layers, leaving a hydrogen-dominated atmosphere above the miscible region deeper in the interior. For very cold sub-Neptunes with very thin hydrogen atmospheres, water may completely condense out to form a liquid ocean below a hydrogen-dominated atmosphere, becoming a hycean planet.

=== Atmosphere ===
Spectroscopic characterization has been performed on a number of sub-Neptunes. These works reveal diversity in their atmospheres, with different metallicities and compositions, presence of clouds and hazes, and albedo, possibly influenced by factors such as size, bulk composition, temperature, and age. Future data, methodologies, and theoretical studies may further refine or refute conclusions drawn from these observational studies.

The atmospheric metallicities of sub-Neptunes appear to vary by several orders of magnitude, ranging from low metallicity atmospheres consistent with the Sun's metallicity, such as TOI-421 b, to very high metallicity atmospheres with enrichment hundreds or thousands of times greater than solar levels, such as TOI-270 d's or GJ 1214 b's.

Bond albedo, which determines a planet's surface temperature, also varies from planet to planet. GJ 1214 b has a high Bond albedo of 0.51, while TOI-824 b appears to be darker, with Bond albedo lower than 0.26.

==== Factors ====
Temperature may play a major role in determining the abundances of different gas species in a planet's atmosphere. The abundance of methane is expected to fall above 800–1100 K as carbon preferentially forms carbon monoxide at high temperatures. Therefore, hydrocarbon hazes forming from photolysis of methane are not expected on hot planets. At temperatures lower than 400 K, haze removal becomes more efficient, resulting in a less hazy atmosphere. This is supported by observations, which found that the atmospheres of warm sub-Neptunes with equilibrium temperatures between 500–800 K feature thick high-altitude aerosols, obscuring absorption signatures of atmospheric gases. Such aerosols may be responsible for "flat" featureless spectra observed in several warm sub-Neptunes, such as GJ 1214, TOI-836 c, and HD 15337 c. Hotter planets such as TOI-421 b, and colder planets such as TOI-270 d, appear to have more clarified atmospheres. At even higher temperatures, a study on HD 86226 c, a small sub-Neptune with equilibrium temperature of 1300 K, found a featureless spectrum, contradicting both the aforementioned trend and predictions for giant planets. However, a high mean molecular mass envelope can also hinder detection of absorption features on this planet.

Disequilibrium chemistry can further modify the atmosphere. On GJ 3470 b, a sub-Neptune with equilibrium temperature of 600 K, processes such as vertical mixing enhanced by tidal heating may be responsible for reducing the abundance of methane, causing the planet's atmosphere to become more clarified than other planets with similar temperatures. Additionally, sulfur dioxide, detected on warm sub-Neptunes GJ 3470 b and TOI-1130 b, as well as on some hot Jupiters, is expected to form in the upper atmospheres as a result of disequilibrium photochemistry. This process becomes more efficient at higher temperatures and metallicities.

A sub-Neptune's atmospheric composition may also evolve as the planet ages, as lighter gases like hydrogen and helium can escape more readily than heavier gases such as water or carbon dioxide, increasing the atmospheric metallicity over time. Observation of V1298 Tauri b and c, approximately 20 million years old sub-Neptune progenitor planets, revealed atmospheres with lower metallicities than their older counterparts. Continued depletion of hydrogen may also allow a sub-Neptune's atmosphere to become oxidizing over time, allowing oxygen buildup in the atmosphere and removing reduced species such as methane and ammonia. This may explain the lack of haze on GJ 9827 d, a small, warm sub-Neptune.

Smaller sub-Neptunes, located near the radius gap, may be more susceptible to atmospheric mass loss, possibly resulting in a greater diversity in atmospheric compositions among this population. Observations of small sub-Neptunes GJ 9827 d, TOI-270 d, TOI-776 c, and GJ 3090 b, indicate all four planets possess high mean molecular mass envelopes, with significant compositional variations between them.

There appears to be a diversity in the underlying bulk compositions of sub-Neptunes, which may be responsible for differences in detected atmospheric metallicities and gases between planets with otherwise similar conditions. Observations and modelings of TOI-270 d, LP 791-18 c, and TOI-421 b suggest that these planets may have rocky, water-poor compositions, while planets such as TOI-824 b and TOI-1130 b appear to be more likely to have water-rich bulk compositions. However, it is not necessarily certain which bulk composition best describes the detected features. Various models, including ones implying water-poor and water-rich compositions, are capable of explaining the detected atmospheric gases on K2-18 b.

==== Evolution ====
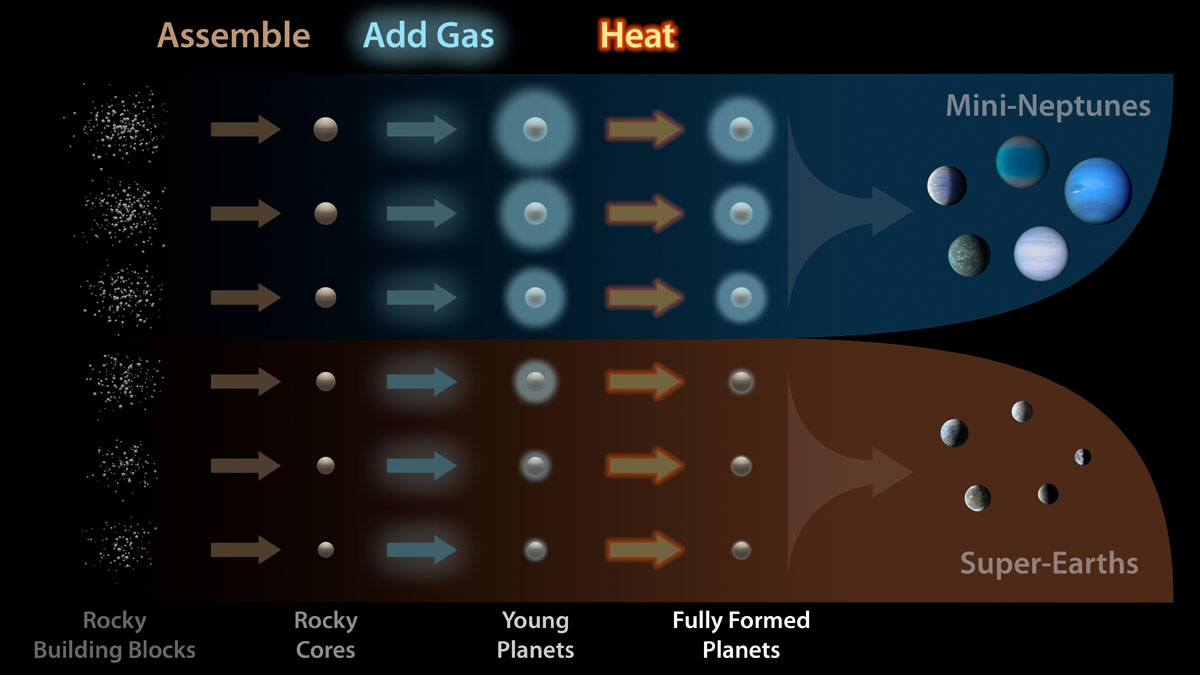
Diagram of how the two classes of small planets, mini-Neptunes and super-Earths, formed.

The volatile atmosphere of a sub-Neptune undergoes escape over time. The most likely mechanisms driving the envelope loss are photoevaporation and core-powered mass loss. Photoevaporation is driven by high energy radiation (specifically X-ray and extreme ultraviolet) heating the upper atmosphere of the planet and inducing a hydrodynamic outflow. Core-powered mass-loss, on the other hand, is driven by thermal energy from the core. Although both mechanisms occur simultaneously, it is not known which, if any, mechanism dominates the envelope loss of sub-Neptunes, as predictions made by both are consistent with observations. One possibility is that core-powered mass loss dominates for planets with lower surface gravity and higher equilibrium temperature, while photoevaporation dominates for planets with higher surface gravity and lower equilibrium temperature, and a planet can transition between one regime to another during its evolution.

The rate of atmospheric loss may reduce dramatically if significant amounts of water is present in the upper atmosphere, as water is effective at radiating in infrared, and efficiently cools the upper atmosphere. Since water is expected to only be present in the upper atmospheres on sufficiently warm sub-Neptunes, this effect may explain the lower occurrences of cooler sub-Neptunes compared to warmer ones. As water can be produced through reaction between the atmosphere and the magma ocean, this effect can be relevant even for sub-Neptunes that formed dry.

The loss of the envelope appears to occur over billions of years, and gradually converts sub-Neptunes into super-Earths. The result in the decrease of sub-Neptune occurrence and the corresponding increase of super-Earth occurrence with age, which has been observed, although it is possible that this instead reflects changes in primordial planet populations formed at different times.

== See also ==
- Super-Neptune
- Steam world
- Neptunian desert
- Super-Earth
- Mega-Earth
