= Super-Earth =

Type of exoplanet larger than Earth

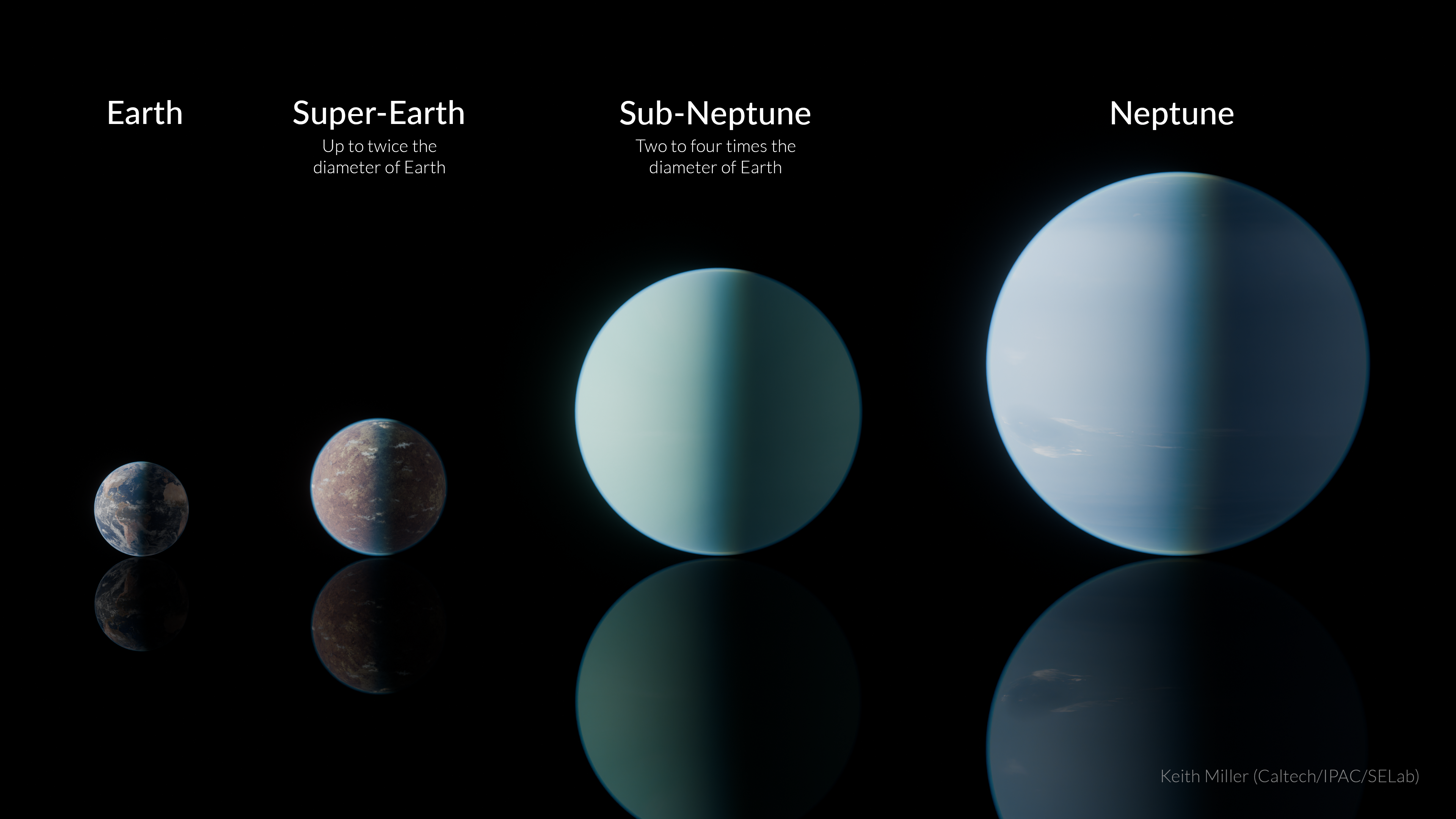
Size comparison of a typical super-Earth (middle left) and sub-Neptune (middle right) compared to Earth and Neptune. Super-Earths and sub-Neptunes are the most common types of exoplanet.

A super-Earth is a type of exoplanet with a mass higher than Earth's, but substantially below those of the Solar System's ice giants, Uranus and Neptune, which are 14.5 and 17.1 times Earth's mass respectively. The term "super-Earth" refers only to the mass of the planet, and so does not imply anything about the surface conditions or habitability. The alternative term "gas dwarfs" may be more accurate for those at the higher end of the mass scale, although "mini-Neptunes" is a more common term.

== Definition ==
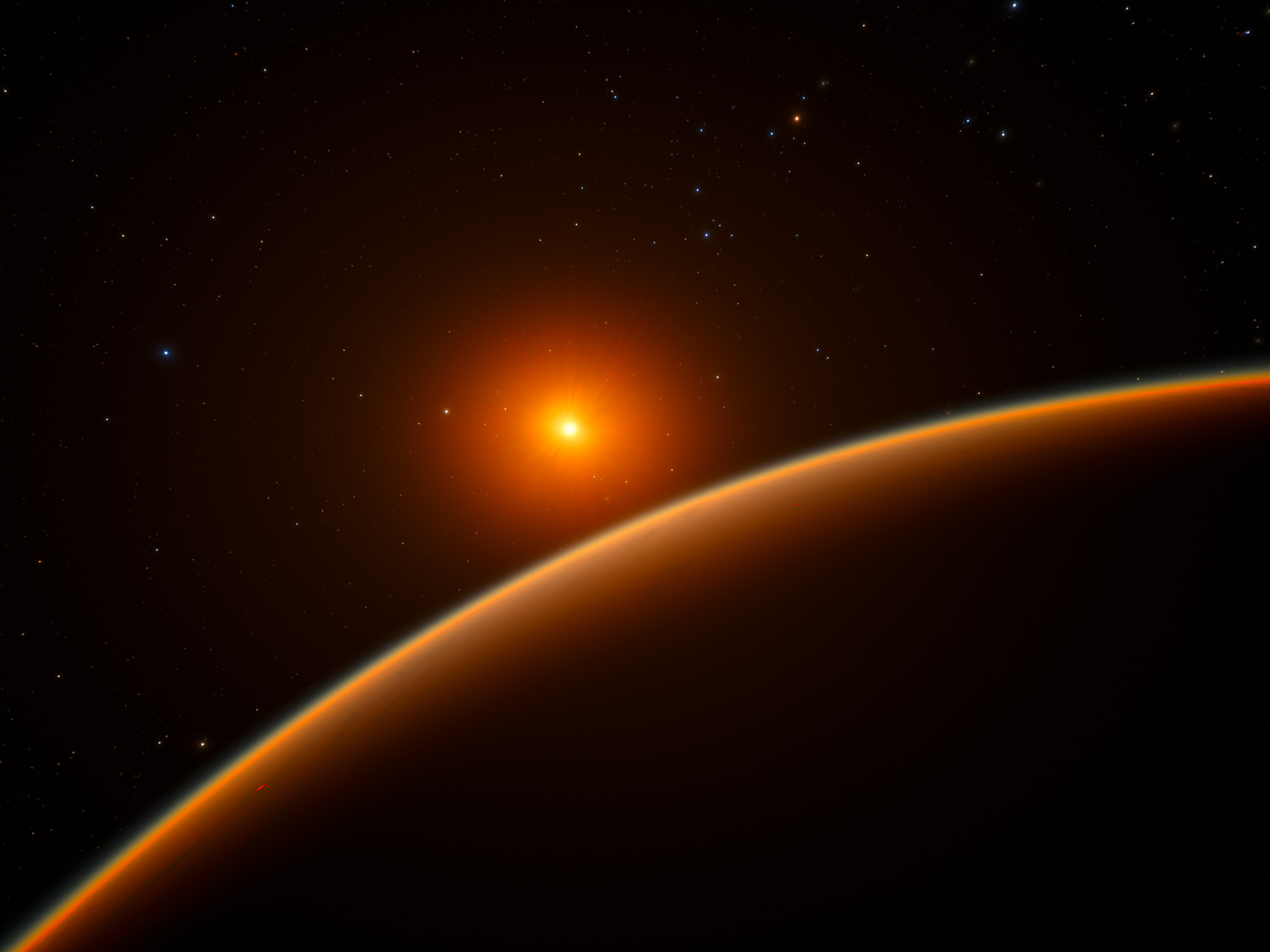
Artist's impression of the super-Earth exoplanet LHS 1140b

In general, super-Earths are defined by their masses. The term does not imply temperatures, compositions, orbital properties, habitability, or environments. While sources generally agree on an upper bound of 10 Earth masses (~69% of the mass of Uranus, which is the Solar System's giant planet with the least mass), the lower bound varies from 1 or 1.9 to 5, with various other definitions appearing in the popular media. The term "super-Earth" is also used by astronomers to refer to planets bigger than Earth-like planets (from 0.8 to 1.2 Earth-radius), but smaller than mini-Neptunes (from 2 to 4 Earth-radii). This definition was made by the Kepler space telescope personnel.

Some authors further suggest that the term super-Earth might be limited to rocky planets without a significant atmosphere, or planets that have not just atmospheres but also solid surfaces or oceans with a sharp boundary between liquid and atmosphere, which the four giant planets in the Solar System do not have. Planets above 10 Earth masses are termed massive solid planets, mega-Earths, or gas giant planets, depending on whether they are mostly made of rock and ice or mostly gas.

== History and discoveries ==
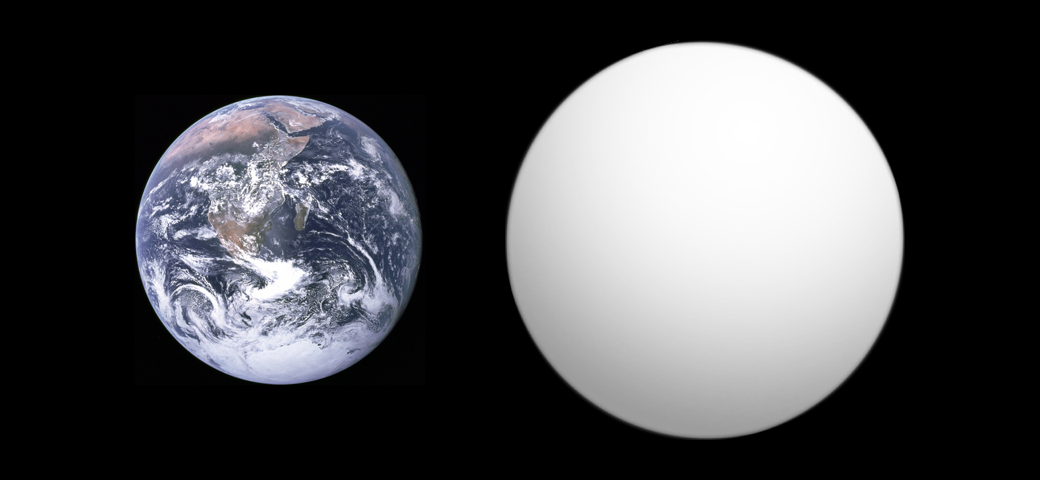
Illustration of the inferred size of the super-Earth Kepler-10b (right) in comparison with Earth

=== First ===
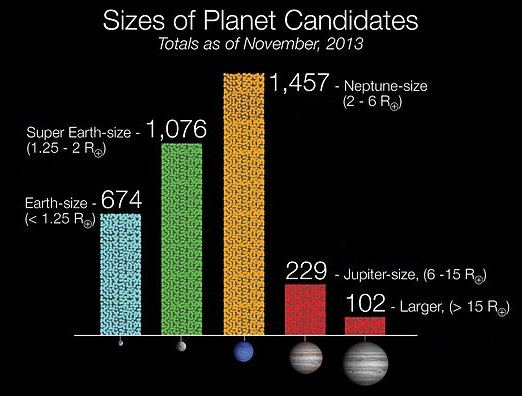
Sizes of Kepler Planet Candidates – based on 2,740 candidates orbiting 2,036 stars as of November 4, 2013 (NASA)

The first super-Earths were discovered by Aleksander Wolszczan and Dale Frail around the pulsar PSR B1257+12 in 1992. The two outer planets (Poltergeist and Phobetor) of the system have masses approximately four times Earth—too small to be gas giants.

The first super-Earth around a main-sequence star was discovered by a team under Eugenio Rivera in 2005. It orbits Gliese 876 and received the designation Gliese 876 d (two Jupiter-sized gas giants had previously been discovered in that system). It has an estimated mass of 7.5 Earth masses and a very short orbital period of about 2 days. Due to the proximity of Gliese 876 d to its host star (a red dwarf), it may have a surface temperature of 430–650 kelvin and be too hot to support liquid water.

=== First in habitable zone ===
In April 2007, a team headed by Stéphane Udry based in Switzerland announced the discovery of two new super-Earths within the Gliese 581 planetary system, both on the edge of the habitable zone around the star where liquid water may be possible on the surface. With Gliese 581c having a mass of at least 5 Earth masses and a distance from Gliese 581 of 0.073 astronomical units (6.8 million mi, 11 million km), it is on the "warm" edge of the habitable zone around Gliese 581 with an estimated mean temperature (without considering effects from an atmosphere) of −3 degrees Celsius with an albedo comparable to Venus and 40 degrees Celsius with an albedo comparable to Earth. Subsequent research suggested Gliese 581c had likely suffered a runaway greenhouse effect like Venus.

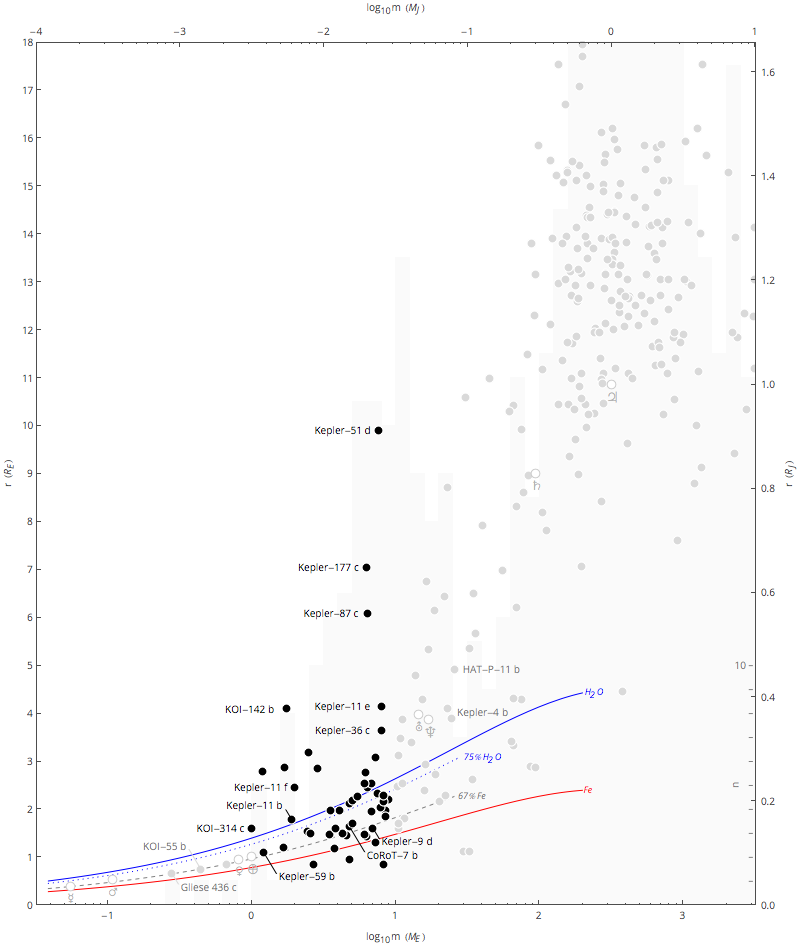
Mass and radius values for transiting super-Earths in context of other detected exoplanets and selected composition models. The "Fe" line defines planets made purely of iron, and "H_{2}O" for those made of water. Those between the two lines, and closer to the Fe line, are most likely solid rocky planets, while those near or above the water line are more likely gas and/or liquid. Planets in the Solar System are on the chart, labeled with their astronomical symbols.

=== Others by year ===
==== 2006 ====
Two further possible super-Earths were discovered in 2006: OGLE-2005-BLG-390Lb with a mass of 5.5 Earth masses, which was found by gravitational microlensing, and HD 69830 b with a mass of 10 Earth masses.

==== 2008 ====
The smallest super-Earth found as of 2008 was MOA-2007-BLG-192Lb. The planet was announced by astrophysicist David P. Bennett for the international MOA collaboration on June 2, 2008. This planet has approximately 3.3 Earth masses and orbits a brown dwarf. It was detected by gravitational microlensing.

In June 2008, European researchers announced the discovery of three super-Earths around the star HD 40307, a star that is only slightly less massive than the Sun. Planets have at least the following minimum masses: 4.2, 6.7, and 9.4 times Earth's. The planets were detected by the radial velocity method by the HARPS (High Accuracy Radial Velocity Planet Searcher) in Chile.

In addition, the same European research team announced a planet 7.5 times the mass of Earth orbiting the star HD 181433. This star also has a Jupiter-like planet that orbits it every three years.

==== 2009 ====
Planet COROT-7b, with a mass estimated at 4.8 Earth masses and an orbital period of only 0.853 days, was announced on 3 February 2009. The density estimate obtained for COROT-7b points to a composition including rocky silicate minerals similar to that of the Solar System's four inner planets, a new and significant discovery. COROT-7b, discovered right after HD 7924 b, is the first super-Earth discovered that orbits a main sequence star that is G class or larger.

The discovery of Gliese 581e with a minimum mass of 1.9 Earth masses was announced on 21 April 2009. It was at the time the smallest extrasolar planet discovered around a normal star and the closest in mass to Earth. Being at an orbital distance of just 0.03 AU and orbiting its star in just 3.15 days, it is not in the habitable zone, and may have 100 times more tidal heating than Jupiter's volcanic satellite Io.

A planet found in December 2009, GJ 1214 b, is 2.7 times as large as Earth and orbits a star much smaller and less luminous than the Sun. "This planet probably does have liquid water," said David Charbonneau, a Harvard professor of astronomy and lead author of an article on the discovery. However, interior models of this planet suggest that under most conditions it does not have liquid water.

By November 2009, a total of 30 super-Earths had been discovered, 24 of which were first observed by HARPS.

==== 2010 ====
Discovered on 5 January 2010, a planet HD 156668 b with a minimum mass of 4.15 Earth masses, is the least massive planet detected by the radial velocity method. The only confirmed radial velocity planet smaller than this planet is Gliese 581e at 1.9 Earth masses (see above). On 24 August, astronomers using ESO's HARPS instrument announced the discovery of a planetary system with up to seven planets orbiting a Sun-like star, HD 10180, one of which, although not yet confirmed, has an estimated minimum mass of 1.35 ± 0.23 times that of Earth, which would be the lowest mass of any exoplanet found to date orbiting a main-sequence star. Although unconfirmed, there is a 98.6% probability that this planet does exist.

The National Science Foundation announced on 29 September the discovery of a fourth super-Earth (Gliese 581g) orbiting within the Gliese 581 planetary system. The planet has a minimum mass 3.1 times that of Earth and a nearly circular orbit at 0.146 AU with a period of 36.6 days, placing it in the middle of the habitable zone where liquid water could exist and midway between the planets c and d. It was discovered using the radial velocity method by scientists at the University of California, Santa Cruz and the Carnegie Institution of Washington. However, the existence of Gliese 581 g has been questioned by another team of astronomers, and it is currently listed as unconfirmed at The Extrasolar Planets Encyclopaedia.

==== 2011 ====
On 2 February, the Kepler Space Observatory mission team released a list of 1235 extrasolar planet candidates, including 68 candidates of approximately "Earth-size" (R_{p} < 1.25 R_{e}) and 288 candidates of "super-Earth-size" (1.25 R_{e} < R_{p} < 2 R_{e}). In addition, 54 planet candidates were detected in the "habitable zone." Six candidates in this zone were less than twice the size of the Earth [namely: KOI 326.01 (R_{p}=0.85 R_{e}), KOI 701.03 (R_{p}=1.73 R_{e}), KOI 268.01 (R_{p}=1.75 R_{e}), KOI 1026.01 (R_{p}=1.77 R_{e}), KOI 854.01 (R_{p}=1.91 R_{e}), KOI 70.03 (R_{p}=1.96 R_{e}) – Table 6] A more recent study found that one of these candidates (KOI 326.01) is in fact much larger and hotter than first reported. Based on the latest Kepler findings, astronomer Seth Shostak estimates "within a thousand light-years of Earth" there are "at least 30,000 of these habitable worlds." Also based on the findings, the Kepler Team has estimated "at least 50 billion planets in the Milky Way" of which "at least 500 million" are in the habitable zone.

On 17 August, a potentially habitable super-Earth HD 85512 b was found using the HARPS as well as a three super-Earth system 82 G. Eridani. On HD 85512 b, it would be habitable if it exhibits more than 50% cloud cover. Then less than a month later, a flood of 41 new exoplanets, including 10 super-Earths, were announced.

On 5 December 2011, the Kepler space telescope discovered its first planet within the habitable zone or "Goldilocks region" of its Sun-like star. Kepler-22b is 2.4 times the radius of the Earth and occupies an orbit 15% closer to its star than the Earth to the Sun. This is compensated for, however, as the star, with a spectral type G5V, is slightly dimmer than the Sun (G2V). Thus, surface temperatures would still allow liquid water on its surface.

On 5 December 2011, the Kepler team announced that they had discovered 2,326 planetary candidates, of which 207 are similar in size to Earth, 680 are super-Earth-size, 1,181 are Neptune-size, 203 are Jupiter-size and 55 are larger than Jupiter. Compared to the February 2011 figures, the number of Earth-size and super-Earth-size planets increased by 200% and 140% respectively. Moreover, 48 planet candidates were found in the habitable zones of surveyed stars, marking a decrease from the February figure; this was due to the more stringent criteria in use in the December data.

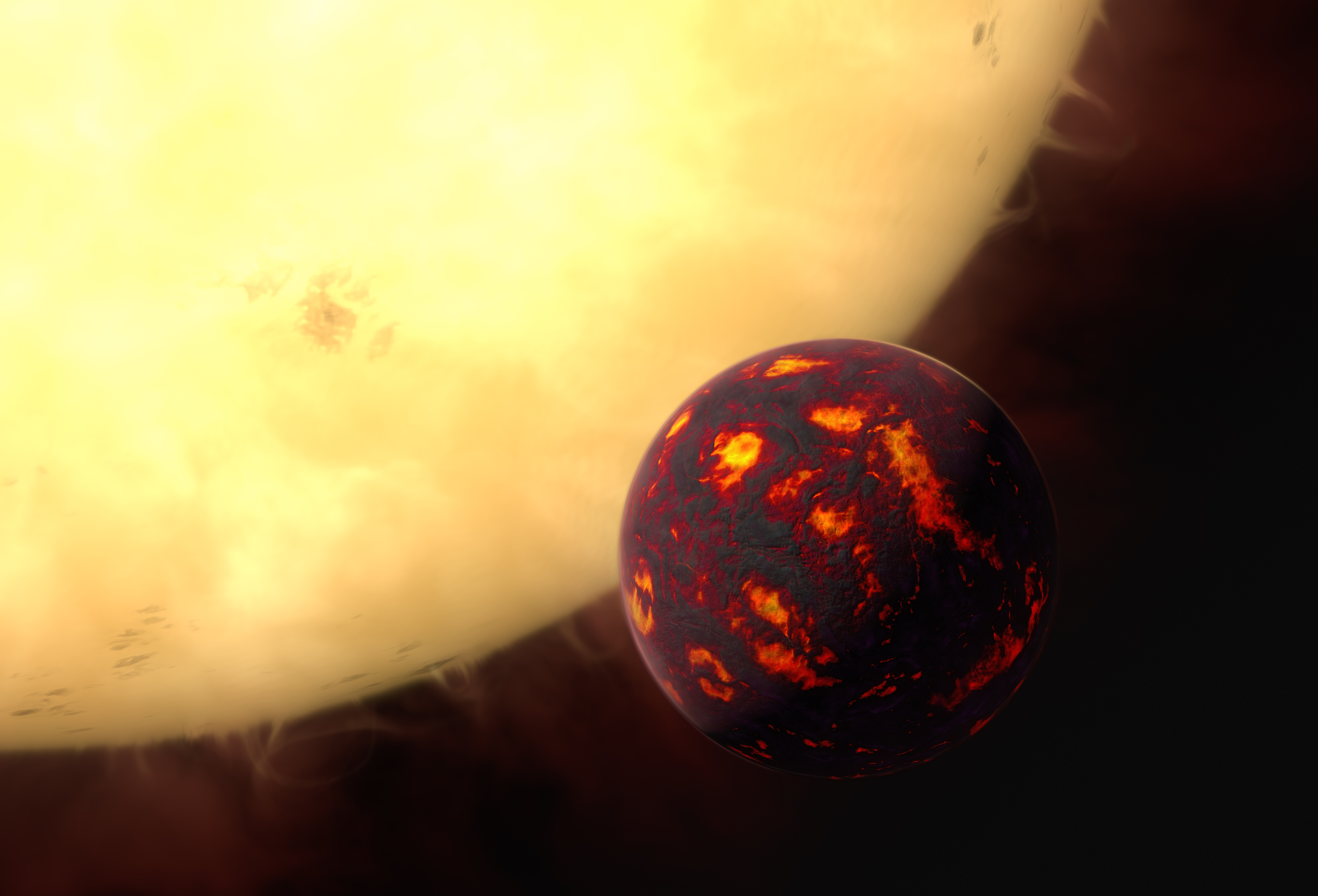
Artist's impression of 55 Cancri Ae in front of its parent star

In 2011, a density of 55 Cancri Ae was calculated which turned out to be similar to Earth's. At the size of about 2 Earth radii, it was the largest planet until 2014, which was determined to lack a significant hydrogen atmosphere.

On 20 December 2011, the Kepler team announced the discovery of the first Earth-size exoplanets, Kepler-20e and Kepler-20f, orbiting a Sun-like star, Kepler-20.

Planet Gliese 667 Cb (GJ 667 Cb) was announced by HARPS on 19 October 2009, together with 29 other planets, while Gliese 667 Cc (GJ 667 Cc) was included in a paper published on 21 November 2011. More detailed data on Gliese 667 Cc were published in early February 2012.

==== 2012 ====
In September 2012, the discovery of two planets orbiting Gliese 163 was announced. One of the planets, Gliese 163 c, about 6.9 times the mass of Earth and somewhat hotter, was considered to be within the habitable zone.

==== 2013 ====
On 7 January 2013, astronomers from the Kepler space observatory announced the discovery of Kepler-69c (formerly KOI-172.02), an Earth-like exoplanet candidate (1.5 times the radius of Earth) orbiting a star similar to the Sun in the habitable zone and possibly a "prime candidate to host alien life".

In April 2013, using observations by NASA's Kepler mission team led by William Borucki, of the agency's Ames Research Center, found five planets orbiting in the habitable zone of a Sun-like star, Kepler-62, 1,200 light years from Earth. These new super-Earths have radii of 1.3, 1.4, 1.6, and 1.9 times that of Earth. Theoretical modelling of two of these super-Earths, Kepler-62e and Kepler-62f, suggests both could be solid, either rocky or rocky with frozen water.

On 25 June 2013, three "super Earth" planets have been found orbiting a nearby star at a distance where life in theory could exist, according to a record-breaking tally announced by the European Southern Observatory. They are part of a cluster of as many as seven planets that circle Gliese 667C, one of three stars located a relatively close 22 light years from Earth in the constellation of Scorpio, it said. The planets orbit Gliese 667C in the so-called Goldilocks Zone — a distance from the star at which the temperature is just right for water to exist in liquid form rather than being stripped away by stellar radiation or locked permanently in ice.

==== 2014 ====
In May 2014, previously discovered Kepler-10c was determined to have the mass comparable to Neptune (17 Earth masses). With the radius of 2.35 R_{🜨}, it is currently the largest known planet likely to have a predominantly rocky composition. At 17 Earth masses, it is well above the 10 Earth mass upper limit that is commonly used for the term 'super-Earth' so the term mega-Earth has been proposed. However, in July 2017, more careful analysis of HARPS-N and HIRES data showed that Kepler-10c was much less massive than originally thought, instead around 7.37 (6.18 to 8.69) M_{🜨} with a mean density of 3.14 g/cm^{3}. Instead of a primarily rocky composition, the more accurately determined mass of Kepler-10c suggests a world made almost entirely of volatiles, mainly water.

==== 2015 ====
On 6 January 2015, NASA announced the 1000th confirmed exoplanet discovered by the Kepler space telescope. Three of the newly confirmed exoplanets were found to orbit within habitable zones of their related stars: two of the three, Kepler-438b and Kepler-442b, are near-Earth-size and likely rocky; the third, Kepler-440b, is a super-Earth.

On 30 July 2015, Astronomy & Astrophysics said they found a planetary system with three super-Earths orbiting a bright, dwarf star. The four-planet system, dubbed HD 219134, had been found 21 light years from Earth in the M-shaped northern hemisphere of constellation Cassiopeia, but it is not in the habitable zone of its star. The planet with the shortest orbit is HD 219134 b, and is Earth's closest known rocky, and transiting, exoplanet.

==== 2016 ====
In February 2016, it was announced that NASA's Hubble Space Telescope had detected hydrogen and helium (and suggestions of hydrogen cyanide), but no water vapor, in the atmosphere of 55 Cancri e, the first time the atmosphere of a super-Earth exoplanet was analyzed successfully.

In August 2016, astronomers announced the detection of Proxima b, an Earth-sized exoplanet that is in the habitable zone of the red dwarf star Proxima Centauri, the closest star to the Sun. Due to its closeness to Earth, Proxima b may be a flyby destination for a fleet of interstellar StarChip spacecraft currently being developed by the Breakthrough Starshot project.

==== 2018 ====
In February 2018, K2-141b, a rocky ultra-short period planet (USP) super-Earth, with a period of 0.28 days orbiting the host star K2-141 (EPIC 246393474) was reported. Another super-Earth, K2-155d, is discovered.

In July 2018, a potential discovery of 40 Eridani b was announced. At 16 light-years it was the closest super-Earth at the time of discovery, and its star was the second-brightest hosting a super-Earth. (Note: However later studies have significantly weaken the evidence for the existence of this planet.)

==== 2019 ====
In July 2019, the discovery of GJ 357 d was announced. Thirty-one light-years from the Solar System, the planet is at least 6.1 M_{🜨}.

==== 2021 ====
In 2021, the exoplanet G 9-40 b was discovered.

==== 2022 ====
In 2022, the discovery of a super-Earth around the red dwarf star Ross 508 was reported. Part of the planet's elliptical orbit takes it within the habitable zone.

==== 2024 ====
On 31 January 2024 NASA reported the discovery of a super-Earth called TOI-715 b located in the habitable zone of a red dwarf star about 137 light-years away.

== In the Solar System ==
The Solar System contains no known super-Earths. Earth is the largest terrestrial planet in the Solar System, and all larger planets have both at least 14 times the mass of Earth and thick gaseous envelopes without well-defined rocky or watery surfaces; that is, they are either gas giants or ice giants, not terrestrial planets.

It has been proposed that the presence of gas giants, namely Jupiter, might have prevented the inward migration of primordial super-Earths into the inner Solar System. This could explain why the Solar System does not possess a super-Earth close to the Sun, unlike more than half of the planetary systems studied by Kepler. The grand tack hypothesis has also been used to explain this lack of hot super-Earths within the Solar System. The fact that there are barely any asteroids or planetesimals inside the orbit of Mercury led some astronomers believing that a super-Earth might have formed in proximity to the Sun, cleared its neighborhood and got destroyed by the Sun. This was supported further by a 2026 study, which found that the engulfment of a super-Earth is able to explain several discrepancies between observations of the Sun (such as the lithium content) and what is predicted by models of stellar evolution.

In January 2016, the existence of a hypothetical super-Earth ninth planet in the Solar System, referred to as Planet Nine, was proposed as an explanation for the orbital behavior of six trans-Neptunian objects, but it is speculated to also be an ice giant like Uranus or Neptune. A refined model in 2019 constrains it to around five Earth masses; planets of this mass are probably mini-Neptunes.

== Characteristics ==
=== Density and bulk composition ===
Comparison of sizes of planets with different compositions

Due to the larger mass of super-Earths, their physical characteristics may differ from Earth's; theoretical models for super-Earths provide four possible main compositions according to their density: low-density super-Earths are inferred to be composed mainly of hydrogen and helium (mini-Neptunes); super-Earths of intermediate density are inferred to either have water as a major constituent (ocean planets), or have a denser core enshrouded with an extended gaseous envelope (gas dwarf or sub-Neptune). A super-Earth of high density is believed to be rocky and/or metallic, like Earth and the other terrestrial planets of the Solar System. A super-Earth's interior could be undifferentiated, partially differentiated, or completely differentiated into layers of different composition. Researchers at Harvard Astronomy Department have developed user-friendly online tools to characterize the bulk composition of the super-Earths. A study on Gliese 876 d by a team around Diana Valencia revealed that it would be possible to infer from a radius measured by the transit method of detecting planets and the mass of the relevant planet what the structural composition is. For Gliese 876 d, calculations range from 9,200 km (1.4 Earth radii) for a rocky planet and very large iron core to 12,500 km (2.0 Earth radii) for a watery and icy planet. Within this range of radii the super-Earth Gliese 876 d would have a surface gravity between 1.9g and 3.3g (19 and 32 m/s^{2}). However, this planet is not known to transit its host star.

The limit between rocky planets and planets with a thick gaseous envelope is calculated with theoretical models. Calculating the effect of the active XUV saturation phase of G-type stars over the loss of the primitive nebula-captured hydrogen envelopes in extrasolar planets, it's obtained that planets with a core mass of more than 1.5 Earth-mass (1.15 Earth-radius max.), most likely cannot get rid of their nebula captured hydrogen envelopes during their whole lifetime. Other calculations point out that the limit between envelope-free rocky super-Earths and sub-Neptunes is around 1.75 Earth-radii, as 2 Earth-radii would be the upper limit to be rocky (a planet with 2 Earth-radii and 5 Earth-masses with a mean Earth-like core composition would imply that 1/200 of its mass would be in a H/He envelope, with an atmospheric pressure near to 2.0 GPa or 20,000 bar). Whether or not the primitive nebula-captured H/He envelope of a super-Earth is entirely lost after formation also depends on the orbital distance. For example, formation and evolution calculations of the Kepler-11 planetary system show that the two innermost planets Kepler-11b and c, whose calculated mass is ≈2 M_{🜨} and between ≈5 and 6 M_{🜨} respectively (which are within measurement errors), are extremely vulnerable to envelope loss. In particular, the complete removal of the primordial H/He envelope by energetic stellar photons appears almost inevitable in the case of Kepler-11b, regardless of its formation hypothesis.

If a super-Earth is detectable by both the radial-velocity and the transit methods, then both its mass and its radius can be determined; thus its average bulk density can be calculated. The actual empirical observations are giving similar results as theoretical models, as it is found that planets larger than approximately 1.6 Earth-radius (more massive than approximately 6 Earth-masses) contain significant fractions of volatiles or H/He gas (such planets appear to have a diversity of compositions that is not well-explained by a single mass-radius relation as that found in rocky planets). After measuring 65 super-Earths smaller than 4 Earth-radii, the empirical data points out that Gas Dwarves would be the most usual composition: there is a trend where planets with radii up to 1.5 Earth-radii increase in density with increasing radius, but above 1.5 radii the average planet density rapidly decreases with increasing radius, indicating that these planets have a large fraction of volatiles by volume overlying a rocky core. Another discovery about exoplanets' composition is that about the gap or rarity observed for planets between 1.5 and 2.0 Earth-radii, which is explained by a bimodal formation of planets (rocky super-Earths below 1.75 and sub-Neptunes with thick gas envelopes being above such radii).

Additional studies, conducted with lasers at the Lawrence Livermore National Laboratory and the OMEGA laboratory at the University of Rochester, show that the magnesium-silicate internal regions of the planet would undergo phase changes under the immense pressures and temperatures of a super-Earth planet, and that the different phases of this liquid magnesium silicate would separate into layers.

=== Geologic activity ===
Further theoretical work by Valencia and others suggests that super-Earths would be more geologically active than Earth, with more vigorous plate tectonics due to thinner plates under more stress. In fact, their models suggested that Earth was itself a "borderline" case, just barely large enough to sustain plate tectonics. These findings were corroborated by van Heck et al., who determined that plate tectonics may be more likely on super-Earths than on Earth itself, assuming similar composition. However, other studies determined that strong convection currents in the mantle acting on strong gravity would make the crust stronger and thus inhibit plate tectonics. The planet's surface would be too strong for the forces of magma to break the crust into plates.

=== Evolution ===
New research suggests that the rocky centres of super-Earths are unlikely to evolve into terrestrial rocky planets like the inner planets of the Solar System because they appear to hold on to their large atmospheres. Rather than evolving into a planet composed mainly of rock with a thin atmosphere, the small rocky core remains engulfed by its large hydrogen-rich envelope.

Theoretical models show that Hot Jupiters and Hot Neptunes can evolve by hydrodynamic loss of their atmospheres to Mini-Neptunes (as it could be the super-Earth GJ 1214 b), or even to rocky planets known as chthonian planets (after migrating towards the proximity of their parent star). The amount of the outermost layers that is lost depends on the size and the material of the planet and the distance from the star. In a typical system, a gas giant orbiting 0.02 AU around its parent star loses 5–7% of its mass during its lifetime, but orbiting closer than 0.015 AU can mean evaporation of the whole planet except for its core.

The low densities inferred from observations imply that a fraction of the super-Earth population has substantial H/He envelopes, which may have been even more massive soon after formation. Therefore, contrary to the terrestrial planets of the solar system, these super-Earths must have formed during the gas-phase of their progenitor protoplanetary disk.

=== Temperatures ===
Since the atmospheres, albedo and greenhouse effects of super-Earths are unknown, the surface temperatures are unknown and generally only an equilibrium temperature is given. For example, the black-body temperature of the Earth is 255.3 K (−18 °C or 0 °F ). It is the greenhouse gases that keep the Earth warmer. Venus has a black-body temperature of only 184.2 K (−89 °C or −128 °F ) even though Venus has a true temperature of 737 K (464 °C or 867 °F ). Though the atmosphere of Venus traps more heat than Earth's, NASA lists the black-body temperature of Venus based on the fact that Venus has an extremely high albedo (Bond albedo 0.90, Visual geometric albedo 0.67), giving it a lower black body temperature than the more absorbent (lower albedo) Earth.

=== Magnetic field ===
Earth's magnetic field results from its flowing liquid metallic core, but in super-Earths the mass can produce high pressures with large viscosities and high melting temperatures, which could prevent the interiors from separating into different layers and so result in undifferentiated coreless mantles. Magnesium oxide, which is rocky on Earth, can be a liquid metal at the pressures and temperatures found in super-Earths and could generate a magnetic field in the mantles of super-Earths. That said, super-Earth magnetic fields are yet to be detected observationally.

=== Habitability ===
According to one hypothesis, super-Earths of about two Earth masses may be conducive to life. The higher surface gravity would lead to a thicker atmosphere, increased surface erosion and hence a flatter topography. The result could be an "archipelago planet" of shallow oceans dotted with island chains ideally suited for biodiversity. A more massive planet of two Earth masses would also retain more heat within its interior from its initial formation much longer, sustaining plate tectonics (which is vital for regulating the carbon cycle and hence the climate) for longer. The thicker atmosphere and stronger magnetic field would also shield life on the surface against harmful cosmic rays.

== See also ==
- Earth analog – Planet with environment similar to Earth's
- Extraterrestrial liquid water – Liquid water naturally occurring outside Earth
- Hot Neptune – Large planet orbiting close to a star
- Super-Neptune – Planet larger than Neptune but smaller than Saturn
- List of nearest terrestrial exoplanet candidates
- Sub-Earth – Planet smaller than Earth
- Mega-Earth – Supermassive terrestrial planet
- TOI-1452 b – Super-Earth orbiting TOI-1452
