= Gliese 581b =

Exoplanet orbiting Gliese 581

Gliese 581 b
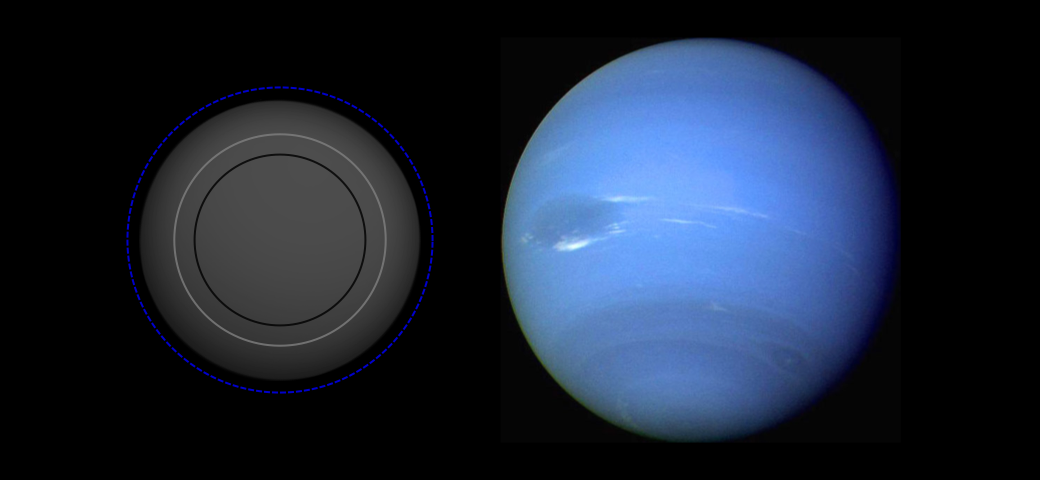
- Size comparison of Gliese 581 b with Neptune (Based on selected hypothetical modeled compositions) (Note: The estimated range of sizes in this image from 2009 is based on the planet's minimum mass. Since the true mass is now known to be somewhat greater, the sizes are likely underestimated, especially if the planet has a hydrogen atmosphere as is likely given its mass.)

Discovery
- Discovered by: X. Bonfils, T. Forveille, X. Delfosse, S. Udry, M. Mayor, C. Perrier, F. Bouchy, F. Pepe, D. Queloz, J.-L. Bertaux
- Discovery date: August 22, 2005 announced November 30, 2005
- Detection method: Doppler spectroscopy

Orbital characteristics
- Semi-major axis: 0.0399±0.0005 AU
- Eccentricity: 0.0342+0.009 −0.010
- Orbital period (sidereal): 5.3686±0.0001 d
- Inclination: 47°+15° −13°
- Time of periastron: 2454751.76 ± 0.01
- Argument of periastron: 54°+13° −14°
- Semi-amplitude: 12.3±0.1 m/s
- Star: Gliese 581

Physical characteristics
- Mass: 20.5+6.2 −3.5 M_{🜨}

Gliese 581b or Gl 581b is an exoplanet orbiting within the Gliese 581 system, located 20.5 light-years (6.3 parsecs) away from Earth in the constellation Libra. It is the first planet discovered of three confirmed in the system so far, and the second in order from the star.

== Discovery ==
The planet was discovered by a team of French and Swiss astronomers, who announced their findings on November 30, 2005, as a discovery of one of the smallest exoplanets then found, with one conclusion being that planets may be more common around the smallest stars. It was the fifth planet found around a red dwarf star (after Gliese 876's first three planets and Gliese 436 b).

The planet was discovered using the HARPS instrument, with which they found the host star to have a wobble that implied the existence of the planet.

The astronomers published their results in Astronomy and Astrophysics Letters.

== Orbit and mass ==
Gliese 581b has a minimum mass of approximately 15.8 times the Earth's mass, similar to Neptune's mass. It does not transit its star, implying that its orbital inclination is less than 88.1 degrees. A 2024 study determined the inclination of the planet, allowing its true mass to be determined, which is about 30% greater than the minimum mass at about 20.5 Earth masses.

The planet is rather close to Gliese 581 and completes a full orbit in only 5.37 days at a mean distance of about 6 million kilometers (0.04 AU). By comparison, Mercury is at a distance of 58 million kilometers (0.387 AU) and completes an orbit in 88 days.

== Characteristics ==
Gliese 581b is about 0.04 AU from its sun. It is likely close to Gliese 436 b in mass, temperature, and (with Gliese 876 d) susceptibility to solar effects such as coronal mass ejection. Gliese 581b does not transit. At the least, given that Gliese 581b orbits alongside two other planets (Gliese 581c and e) and that Gliese 436 b (thus far) stands alone, their formation must have differed.

== See also ==
- Habitability of red dwarf systems
