= HD 114729 b =

Extrasolar planet in the constellation of Centaurus

Discovery
- Discovered by: Butler, Marcy, Vogt
- Discovery site: United States
- Discovery date: 2003
- Detection method: Radial velocity

Orbital characteristics
- Apastron: 2.46 AU (368,000,000 km)
- Periastron: 1.76 AU (263,000,000 km)
- Semi-major axis: 2.11 ± 0.12 AU (316,000,000 ± 18,000,000 km)
- Eccentricity: 0.167±0.055
- Orbital period (sidereal): 1114±15 d 3.050 y
- Time of periastron: 2,450,520±67
- Argument of periastron: 93±30
- Semi-amplitude: 18.8±1.3
- Star: HD 114729

HD 114729 b is an extrasolar planet approximately 114 light years away in the constellation of Centaurus. This planet is probably slightly less massive than Jupiter. It is an "eccentric Jupiter" meaning that it does not orbit very near the star like the famous 51 Pegasi b but further out and its orbit is very oval-shaped. The mean distance from the star is 2.11 AU, about twice the Earth's distance from the Sun. At periastron, the planet is only 1.43 AU from the star (comparable to the distance of Mars from the Sun), and at apoastron, the orbital distance is 2.72 AU (inner asteroid belt).
