= Gliese 581d =

Contested super-Earth orbiting Gliese 581

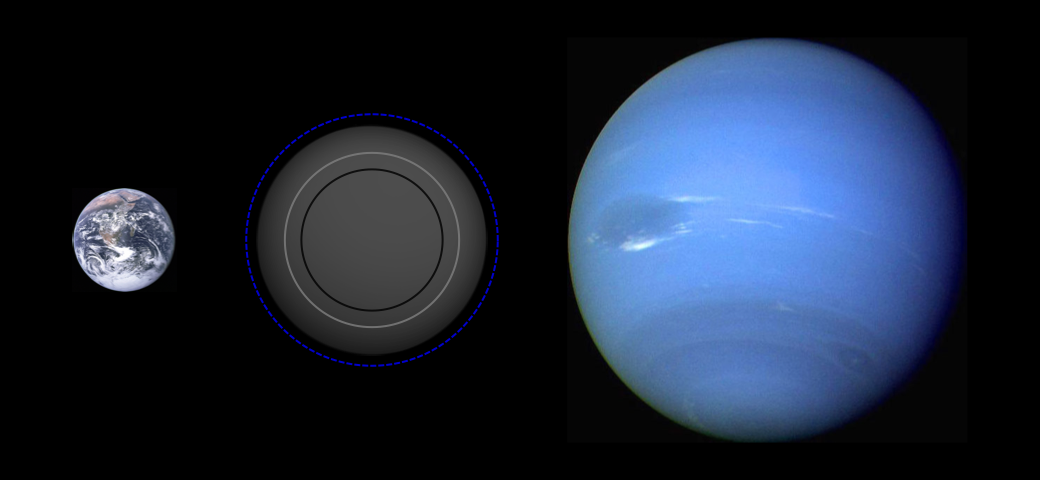
- Size comparison of Gliese 581d with Earth and Neptune. (Based on selected hypothetical modeled compositions)

Discovery
- Discovered by: Udry et al.
- Discovery site: La Silla Observatory, Chile
- Discovery date: 24 April 2007
- Detection method: Radial velocity

Orbital characteristics
- Semi-major axis: 0.21847 ± 0.00028 AU (32,683,000 ± 42,000 km)
- Eccentricity: 0.205±0.08
- Orbital period (sidereal): 66.64±0.08 d
- Time of periastron: 245141.6407±4.19 JD
- Argument of periastron: 2°±23°
- Semi-amplitude: 2.20±0.19 m/s
- Star: Gliese 581

Physical characteristics
- Mass: ≥5.6±0.6 M_{🜨}

Gliese 581d /ˈɡliːzə/ (often shortened to Gl 581d or GJ 581d) is a doubtful, and frequently disputed, exoplanet candidate orbiting within the Gliese 581 system, approximately 20.4 light-years away in the constellation Libra. It was the third planet claimed in the system and the fourth (in a 4-planet model) or fifth (in a disproven 5- or 6-planet model) in order from the star. Multiple subsequent studies found that the planetary signal in fact originates from stellar activity, and thus the planet does not exist, but this remains disputed.

Though significantly more massive than Earth (at a minimum mass of 6.98 Earth masses), this super-Earth was the first exoplanet of relatively low mass regarded as orbiting within the habitable zone of its parent star. Assuming its existence, computer climate simulations have confirmed the possibility of the existence of surface water and these factors combine to a relatively high measure of planetary habitability.

== History ==
=== Discovery ===
A team of astronomers led by Stéphane Udry of the Geneva Observatory used the HARPS instrument on the European Southern Observatory 3.6 meter telescope in La Silla, Chile, to discover the planet in 2007. Udry's team employed the radial velocity technique, in which the minimum mass of a planet is determined based on the small perturbations it induces in its parent star's orbit via gravity. This study estimated an orbital period of 83 days for the planet.

In late April 2009, the original discovery team revised its original estimate of the planet's orbital parameters, finding that it orbits closer to its star than originally determined with an orbital period of 66.8 days. They concluded that the planet is within the habitable zone where liquid water could exist. A 2010 study of aliasing in radial velocity data found that the true period of Gliese 581d remained unclear, with even a 1-day period being a possibility. Later models of the system including planet d from 2010-2013 supported a 67-day period.

=== Disputed existence ===
In September 2012, Roman Baluev filtered out the "red noise" from the Keck data and concluded that this planet's existence is probable only to 2.2 standard deviations, and thus is uncertain. Earlier that same year, however, S. S. Vogt (USNO), together with R. P. Butler and N. Haghighipour, published a study that supported the existence of the planet with a much higher probability; they also pursued a dynamical analysis of the system. Additional work on Gliese 581 as a four-planet system (thus, including planet d), demonstrating its long-term orbital stability, was given by Makarov and coauthors.

A study in 2014 concluded that Gliese 581d is "an artifact of stellar activity which, when incompletely corrected, causes the false detection of planet g." In 2015, a study by Guillem Anglada-Escudé and Mikko Tuomi questioned the 2014 work, claiming a significant shortcoming in the adopted statistical method; however, this study was published along with a rebuttal by the team that published the 2014 refutation. Another 2015 study added support to the conclusion that the radial velocity signal originates from stellar activity, and a 2016 study provided additional strong evidence for it.

In 2016, E. R. Newton and collaborators pointed out that for early M dwarfs, planets in their habitable zones may have orbital periods coinciding with the stellar rotation period (or in rare cases, such as Gliese 581d, half of it, if the standard value of 132 days is assumed); this aspect seriously complicates the verification of any such planets.

Evidence based on a 2022 paper confirmed the results of previous studies suggesting that the announcement of Gliese 581d stems from a false detection due to stellar activity. This work uses an updated technique correlating stellar activity to RV signals.

A 2024 research note argued that it is still possible that Gliese 581d might exist, on the basis of a new measurement of Gliese 581's rotation period at 148.7±0.8 d, as opposed to the previous value of 130±2 d from the 2014 study refuting the planet. This new rotation period is not a multiple of the planet's proposed period. However, no reanalysis of the radial velocity data was done, so further research will be needed to draw a conclusion.

== Orbital characteristics ==
Gliese 581d was thought to orbit Gliese 581 at 0.21847 AU, approximately a fifth of the distance that the Earth orbits the Sun, though its orbital eccentricity has not been confirmed. There were two models for its orbit, a circular one like Earth's, and an eccentric one like Mercury's. These were based on the six-planet and four-planet model for the Gliese 581 system, respectively. Under the four-planet model Gliese 581d would most probably be in a spin-orbit resonance of 2:1, rotating twice for each orbit of its parent star. Therefore, the day on Gliese 581d should approximately be 67 Earth days long.

The orbital distance places it at the outer limits of the habitable zone, the distance at which it is believed possible for water to exist on the surface of a planetary body. At the time of its discovery, the planet's orbit was originally thought to be farther out. However, in late April 2009 the original discovery team revised its original estimate of the planet's orbital parameters, finding that it orbits closer to its star than originally determined with an orbital period of 66.87 days. They concluded that the planet is within the habitable zone where liquid water could exist.

== Physical characteristics ==
The motion of the parent star indicates a minimum mass for Gliese 581d of 5.6 Earth masses (earlier analyses gave higher values). Dynamical simulations of the Gliese 581 system assuming that the orbits of the three planets are coplanar show that the system becomes unstable if the masses of the planets exceed 1.6–2 times the minimum values. Using earlier minimum mass values for Gliese 581d, this implies an upper mass limit for Gliese 581d of 13.8 Earth masses. The composition of the planet, however, is not known.

=== Climate and habitability ===
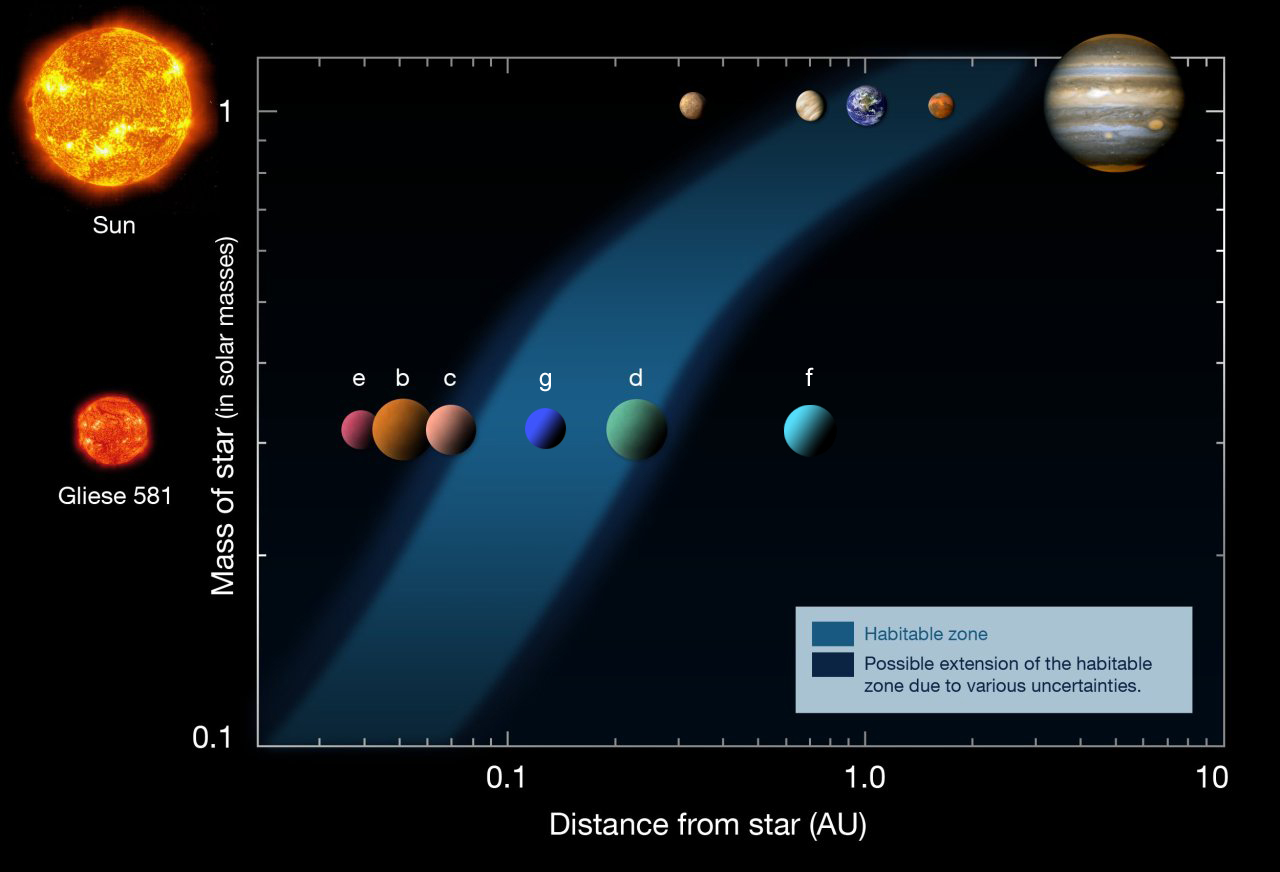
The habitable zone of Gliese 581 compared with our Solar System's habitable zone, showing Gliese 581d near the outer edge

As the planet is not known to transit from Earth and atmospheric conditions are not observable with current technology, no atmosphere for the planet has been confirmed to date. As such, all climate predictions for the planet are based on predicted orbits and computer modelling of theoretical atmospheric conditions.

Because Gliese 581d was believed to orbit outside the habitable zone of its star it was originally thought to be too cold for liquid water to be present. With the 2009 revised orbit, climate simulations conducted by researchers in France in 2011 indicated possible temperatures suitable for surface water at sufficient atmospheric pressure. According to Stéphane Udry, "It could be covered by a 'large and deep ocean'; it is the first serious ocean planet candidate."

On average, the light that Gliese 581d receives from its star has about 30% of the intensity of light the Earth receives from the Sun. By comparison, sunlight on Mars has about 40% of the intensity of that on Earth. That might seem to suggest that Gliese 581d is too cold to support liquid water and hence is inhospitable to life. However, an atmospheric greenhouse effect can significantly raise planetary temperatures. For example, Earth's own mean temperature would be about −18 °C without any greenhouse gases, ranging from around 100 °C on the day side to −150 °C at night, much like that found on the Moon. If the atmosphere of Gliese 581d produces a sufficiently large greenhouse effect, and the planet's geophysics stabilize the CO_{2} levels (as Earth's does via plate tectonics), then the surface temperature might permit a liquid water cycle, conceivably allowing the planet to support life. Calculations by Barnes et al. suggest, however, that tidal heating is too low to keep plate tectonics active on the planet, unless radiogenic heating is somewhat higher than expected.

Gliese 581d is probably too massive to be made only of rocky material. It may have originally formed on a more distant orbit as an icy planet that then migrated closer to its star.

If Gliese 581d exists, it would be the first super-Earth identified to be located in a habitable zone outside of the Solar System, according to work published in 2007.

== Hello from Earth ==
As part of the 2009 National Science Week celebrations in Australia, Cosmos magazine launched a website called "Hello from Earth" to collect messages for transmission to Gliese 581d. The maximum length of the messages was 160 characters, and they were restricted to the English language. In total, 25,880 messages were collected from 195 countries around the world. The messages were transmitted from the DSS-43 70 m radio telescope at the Canberra Deep Space Communication Complex at Tidbinbilla, Australia, on 28 August 2009.

== In popular culture ==
Gliese 581d is the setting for the Doctor Who episode "Smile". It is also shown in Into the Universe with Stephen Hawking's Episode 3: The Story of Everything, and in Episode 3 and 8 of Season 2 of How the Universe Works.

== See also ==
- Earth analog
- Gliese 667 Cc
- HD 85512 b
- Kepler-22b
- List of potentially habitable exoplanets
