= Lick–Carnegie Exoplanet Survey =

Astronomical survey

- Alternative names: LCES
- Website: www.exoplanets.org/cps.html

The Lick–Carnegie Exoplanet Survey (LCES) is a search for exoplanets using the Keck I optical telescope of the W. M. Keck Observatory in Hawaii. The survey is sponsored by NASA and the National Science Foundation. The survey comprises a decade of observations. The survey is led by Steven S. Vogt, professor of astronomy and astrophysics at University of California, Santa Cruz, and R. Paul Butler of the Carnegie Institution for Science.

The search was started as the San Francisco State University Planet Search in 1987 by Geoffrey Marcy and R. Paul Butler, using the Lick Observatory. The founding team was the recipient of the 2002 Carl Sagan Memorial Award. It was later renamed the California and Carnegie Planet Search.

The activities of the Lick–Carnegie Extrasolar Planet Search Program include precision Doppler based monitoring of over 1330 nearby F, G, K, and M stars for planets using radial velocity measurements at 2–3 m/s precision. It contributed over 70% of the exoplanets known as of 2010. These extrasolar planetary systems display a diversity of orbital periods, sizes, and eccentricities, providing new insight into the origins and evolution of planetary systems.

In September 2010, the team announced the discovery of Gliese 581g in orbit within the Gliese 581 planetary system. The observations place the planet in an area where liquid water could exist on the planet's surface, that is, a habitable zone. If confirmed, this would be the first strong case for a potentially habitable Earth-like exoplanet yet discovered. One contributor to the team was Peter Jalowiczor, an amateur astronomer who analyzed some of the data the team released to the public. His work contributed to the discovery of four exoplanets.
