= HD 114729 =

Star in the constellation Centaurus

Observation data Epoch J2000 Equinox ICRS
- Constellation: Centaurus
- Right ascension: 13^{h} 12^{m} 44.259^{s}
- Declination: −31° 52′ 24.06″
- Apparent magnitude (V): 6.68

Characteristics
- Evolutionary stage: main sequence
- Spectral type: G0 V
- B−V color index: 0.591±0.008

Astrometry
Radial velocity (R_{v})	26.3378±0.0187 km/s
Proper motion (μ)	RA: −199.927 mas/yr Dec.: −308.130 mas/yr
Parallax (π)	26.3378±0.0187 mas
Distance	123.84 ± 0.09 ly (37.97 ± 0.03 pc)
Absolute magnitude (M_{V})	3.89

Details

HD 114729 A
Mass	0.97±0.01 M_{☉}
Radius	1.44±0.03 R_{☉}
Luminosity	2.33±0.02 L_{☉}
Surface gravity (log g)	4.10±0.02 cgs
Temperature	5,939±58 K
Metallicity [Fe/H]	−0.220 dex
Age	9.30±0.60 Gyr

HD 114729 B
Mass	0.253±0.011 M_{☉}

Other designations
- CD−31°10156, HD 114729, HIP 64459, SAO 204237, WDS J13127-3152A

Database references
SIMBAD	data

HD 114729 is a Sun-like star with an orbiting exoplanet in the southern constellation of Centaurus. Based on parallax measurements, it is located at a distance of 124 light years from the Sun. It is near the lower limit of visibility to the naked eye, having an apparent visual magnitude of 6.68 The system is drifting further away with a heliocentric radial velocity of 26.3 km/s. The system has a relatively high proper motion, traversing the celestial sphere at an angular rate of 0.373″·yr^{−1}.

The spectrum of HD 114729 presents as an ordinary G-type main-sequence star, a yellow dwarf, with a stellar classification of G0 V. It has a negligible level of magnetic activity, making it chromosperically quiet. The star has about the same mass as the Sun, but the radius has expanded to 44% greater than the Sun's girth. It is radiating more than double the luminosity of the Sun from its photosphere at an effective temperature of 5,939 K. The size and luminosity suggest a much greater age than the Sun; perhaps around nine billion years.

HD 114729 has a co-moving companion designated HD 114729 B, with the latter having 25.3% of the Sun's mass and a projected separation of 282±10 AU.

== Planetary system ==
In 2003 the California and Carnegie Planet Search team announced the discovery of a planet orbiting the star. This planet orbits twice as far away from the star as Earth to the Sun and orbits very eccentrically. It has mass at least 95% (0.840) that of Jupiter and thus a minimum of 267 times the mass of Earth.

The HD 114729 planetary system
Companion (in order from star)	Mass	Semimajor axis (AU)	Orbital period (days)	Eccentricity	Inclination (°)	Radius
b	>0.95±0.10 M_{J}	2.11±0.12	1114±15	0.167±0.055	—	—

== See also ==
- List of extrasolar planets
