= Gliese 581c =

Super-Earth exoplanet orbiting Gliese 581

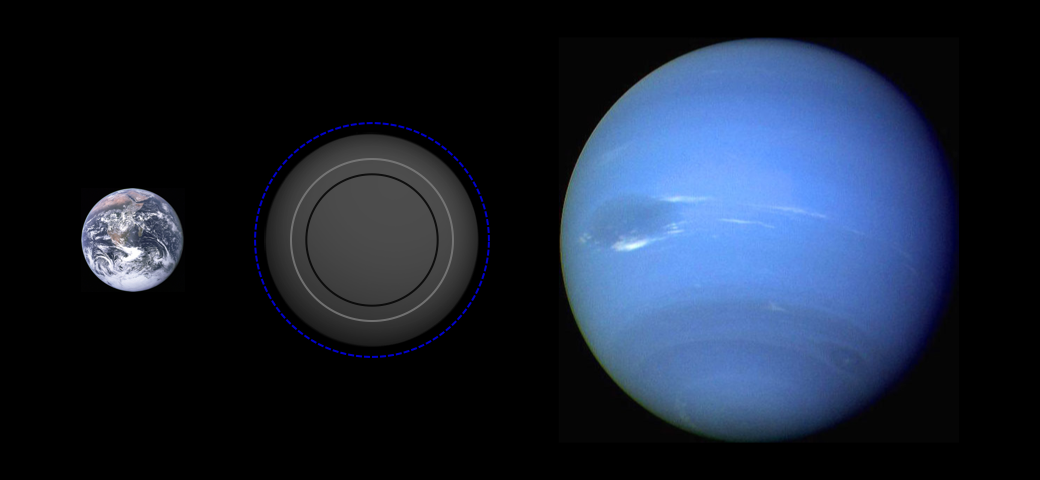
- Size comparison of Gliese 581c with Earth and Neptune (based on selected hypothetical modeled compositions) (Note: The estimated range of sizes in this image from 2009 is based on the planet's minimum mass. Since the true mass is now known to be somewhat greater, the sizes are likely underestimated, especially if the planet has a hydrogen atmosphere.)

Discovery
- Discovered by: Stéphane Udry et al.
- Discovery site: La Silla Observatory
- Discovery date: 4 April 2007; 24 April 2007 (announced)
- Detection method: Radial velocity

Orbital characteristics
- Semi-major axis: 0.0718+0.0008 −0.0009 AU
- Eccentricity: 0.032+0.027 −0.021
- Orbital period (sidereal): 12.9211+0.0008 −0.0007 d
- Inclination: 47°+15° −13°
- Time of periastron: 2454759.2 ± 0.1
- Argument of periastron: 16°+61° −89°
- Semi-amplitude: 3.1±0.1 m/s
- Star: Gliese 581

Physical characteristics
- Mass: 6.81+0.21 −1.16 M_{🜨}

Gliese 581c (/ˈɡliːzə/; Gl 581c or GJ 581c) is an exoplanet orbiting within the Gliese 581 system. It is the second planet discovered in the system and the third in order from the star. With a mass about 6.8 times that of the Earth, it is classified as a super-Earth (a category of planets with masses greater than Earth's up to ten Earth masses).

At the time of its discovery in 2007, Gliese 581c gained interest from astronomers because it was reported to be the first potentially Earth-like planet in the habitable zone of its star, with a temperature right for liquid water on its surface, and, by extension, potentially capable of supporting extremophile forms of Earth-like life. However, further research cast doubt upon the planet's habitability. Based on newer models of the habitable zone, the planet is likely too hot to be potentially habitable.

In astronomical terms, the Gliese 581 system is relatively close to Earth, at 20.55 light-years (194 trillion kilometres; 121 trillion miles) in the direction of the constellation of Libra. This distance, along with the declination and right ascension coordinates, give its exact location in the Milky Way.

== Discovery ==
The team released a paper of their findings dated 27 April 2007, published in the July 2007 journal Astronomy & Astrophysics. At the time of discovery, it was reported to be the first potentially Earth-like planet in the habitable zone of its star and the smallest-known exoplanet around a main-sequence star, but on 21 April 2009, another planet orbiting Gliese 581, Gliese 581e, with an approximate mass of 1.9 Earth masses, was announced. In the paper, they also announced the discovery of another planet in the system, Gliese 581d, with a minimum mass of 7.7 Earth masses and a semi-major axis of 0.25 astronomical units.

== Physical characteristics ==
=== Mass ===
The existence of Gliese 581c and its mass have been measured by the radial velocity method of detecting exoplanets. The mass of a planet is calculated by the small periodic movements around a common centre of mass between the host star Gliese 581 and its planets. When all planets are fitted with a Keplerian solution, the minimum mass of the planet is determined to be 5.5 Earth masses. The radial velocity method cannot by itself determine the true mass, but it cannot be very much larger than this or the system would be dynamically unstable. Dynamical simulations of the Gliese 581 system which assume the orbits of the planets are coplanar indicate that the planets cannot exceed approximately 1.6 to 2 times their minimum masses or the planetary system would be unstable (this is primarily due to the interaction between planets e and b). For Gliese 581c, the upper bound is 10.4 Earth masses.

A 2024 study determined the inclination of the planet, allowing its true mass to be determined, which is about 30% greater than the minimum mass at about 6.8 Earth masses.

=== Radius ===
Since Gliese 581c has not been detected in transit, there are no measurements of its radius. Furthermore, the radial velocity method used to detect it only puts a lower limit on the planet's mass, which means theoretical models of planetary radius and structure can only be of limited use. However, assuming a random orientation of the planet's orbit, the true mass is likely to be close to the measured minimum mass.

Assuming that the true mass is the minimum mass, the radius may be calculated using various models. For example, if Gliese 581c is a rocky planet with a large iron core, it should have a radius approximately 50% larger than that of Earth, according to Udry's team. Gravity on such a planet's surface would be approximately 2.24 times as strong as on Earth. However, if Gliese 581c is an icy and/or watery planet, its radius would be less than 2 times that of Earth, even with a very large outer hydrosphere, according to density models compiled by Diana Valencia and her team for Gliese 876 d. Gravity on the surface of such an icy and/or watery planet would be at least 1.25 times as strong as on Earth. They claim the real value of the radius may be anything between the two extremes calculated by density models outlined above.

Other scientists' views differ. Sara Seager at MIT has speculated that Gliese 581c and other five-Earth-mass planets could be:

- "rock giants" mostly of silicate;
- "cannonball" planets of solid iron;
- "gas dwarfs" mostly of helium and hydrogen;
- carbon-rich "diamond worlds";
- purely hot "ice VII worlds";
- purely "carbon monoxide worlds".

If the planet transits the star as seen from the direction of the Earth, the radius should be measurable, albeit with some uncertainty. Unfortunately, measurements made with the Canadian-built MOST space telescope indicate that transits do not occur.

The new research suggests that the rocky centres of super-Earths are unlikely to evolve into terrestrial rocky planets like the inner planets of the Solar System because they appear to hold onto their large atmospheres. Rather than evolving to a planet composed mainly of rock with a thin atmosphere, the small rocky core remains engulfed by its large hydrogen-rich envelope.

=== Orbit ===
The orbits of the Gliese 581 system, as per the 2009 four-planet model. In the picture, Gliese 581c is the third planet from the star.

Gliese 581c has an orbital period ("year") of 13 Earth days and its orbital radius is only about 7% that of the Earth, about 11 million km, while the Earth is 150 million km from the Sun. Since the host star is smaller and colder than the Sun—and thus less luminous—this distance places the planet on the "warm" edge of the habitable zone around the star according to Udry's team. Note that in astrophysics, the "habitable zone" is defined as the range of distances from the star at which a planet could support liquid water on its surface: it should not be taken to mean that the planet's environment would be suitable for humans, a situation which requires a more restrictive range of parameters. In any case, based on newer models of the habitable zone, the planet is likely too hot to be potentially habitable.

A typical radius for an M0 star of Gliese 581's age and metallicity is 0.00128 AU, against the Sun's 0.00465 AU. This proximity means that the primary star should appear 3.75 times wider and 14 times larger in area for an observer on the planet's surface looking at the sky than the Sun appears to be from Earth's surface.

=== Tidal lock ===
Because of its small separation from Gliese 581, the planet has been generally considered to always have one hemisphere facing the star (only day), and the other always facing away (only night), or in other words being tidally locked. The most recent orbital fit to the system, taking stellar activity into account indicates a nearly circular orbit, but older fits used an eccentricity between 0.10 and 0.22. If the orbit of the planet were eccentric, it would undergo violent tidal flexing. Because tidal forces are stronger when the planet is close to the star, eccentric planets are expected to have a rotation period that is shorter than its orbital period, also called pseudo-synchronization. An example of this effect is seen in Mercury, which is tidally locked in a 3:2 resonance, completing three rotations every two orbits. In any case, even in the case of 1:1 tidal lock, the planet would undergo libration and the terminator would be alternatively lit and darkened during libration.

Models of the evolution of the planet's orbit over time suggest that heating resulting from this tidal locking may play a major role in the planet's geology. Models proposed by scientists predict that tidal heating could yield a surface heat flux about three times greater than that of Jupiter's moon Io, which could result in major geological activity such as volcanoes and plate tectonics.

== Habitability and climate ==
The study of Gliese 581c by the von Bloh et al. team is quoted as concluding "The super-Earth Gl 581c is clearly outside the habitable zone, since it is too close to the star." The study by Selsis et al. states that "a planet in the habitable zone is not necessarily habitable" itself, and this planet "is outside what can be considered the conservative habitable zone" of the parent star, and further that if there was any water there then it was lost when the red dwarf was a strong X-ray and EUV emitter, it could have surface temperatures ranging from 700 to 1,000 K (427 to 727 °C), like Venus today. Temperature speculations by other scientists were based on the temperature of (and heat from) the parent star Gliese 581 and have been calculated without factoring in the margin of error (96 °C/K) for the star's temperature of 3,432 K to 3,528 K, which leads to a large irradiance range for the planet, even before eccentricity is considered.

=== Effective temperatures ===
Using the measured stellar luminosity of Gliese 581 of 0.013 times that of the Sun, it is possible to calculate Gliese 581c's effective temperature, a.k.a. black body temperature, which probably differs from its surface temperature. According to Udry's team, the effective temperature for Gliese 581c, assuming an albedo (reflectivity) such as that of Venus (0.64), would be −3 °C (27 °F), and assuming an Earth-like albedo (0.296), it would be 40 °C (104 °F), a range of temperatures that overlap with the range at which water would be liquid at a pressure of 1 atmosphere. However, the effective temperature and actual surface temperature can be very different due to the greenhouse properties of the planetary atmosphere. For example, Venus has an effective temperature of −41 °C (−42 °F), but a surface temperature of 464 °C (867 °F) (mainly due to a 96.5% carbon dioxide atmosphere), a difference of about 505 °C (910 °F).

Studies of habitability (i.e. liquid water for extremophile forms of life) conclude that Gliese 581c is likely to suffer from a runaway greenhouse effect similar to that found on Venus and, as such, is highly unlikely to be habitable. Nevertheless, this runaway greenhouse effect could be prevented by the presence of sufficient reflective cloud cover on the planet's day side. Alternatively, if the surface were covered in ice, it would have a high albedo (reflectivity), and thus could reflect enough of the incident sunlight back into space to render the planet too cold for habitability, although this situation is expected to be very unstable except for very high albedos greater than about 0.95 (i.e. ice): release of carbon dioxide by volcanic activity or of water vapor due to heating at the substellar point would trigger a runaway greenhouse effect.

=== Liquid water ===
Gliese 581c is likely to lie outside the habitable zone. No direct evidence has been found for water to be present, and it is probably not present in the liquid state. Techniques like the one used to measure the extrasolar planet HD 209458 b may in the future be used to determine the presence of water in the form of vapor in the planet's atmosphere, but only in the rare case of a planet with an orbit aligned so as to transit its star, which Gliese 581c is not known to do.

=== Tidally locked models ===
Theoretical models predict that volatile compounds such as water and carbon dioxide, if present, might evaporate in the scorching heat of the sunward side, migrate to the cooler night side, and condense to form ice caps. Over time, the entire atmosphere might freeze into ice caps on the night side of the planet. However, it remains unknown if water and/or carbon dioxide are even present on the surface of Gliese 581c. Alternatively, an atmosphere large enough to be stable would circulate the heat more evenly, allowing for a wider habitable area on the surface. For example, although Venus has a small axial inclination, very little sunlight reaches the surface at the poles. A slow rotation rate approximately 117 times slower than Earth's produces prolonged days and nights. Despite the uneven distribution of sunlight cast on Venus at any given time, polar areas and the night side of Venus are kept almost as hot as on the day side by globally circulating winds.

== A Message from Earth ==
A Message from Earth (AMFE) is a high-powered digital radio signal that was sent on 9 October 2008 towards Gliese 581c. The signal is a digital time capsule containing 501 messages that were selected through a competition on the social networking site Bebo. The message was sent using the RT-70 radar telescope of Ukraine's State Space Agency. The signal will reach the planet Gliese 581c in early 2029. More than half a million people including celebrities and politicians participated in the AMFE project, which was the world's first digital time capsule where the content was selected by the public.

== In popular culture ==
Estonian singer Laura Põldvere sings poetically about the "beautiful far-away planet" in her song 581c.

== See also ==
- Circumstellar habitable zone (Goldilocks phenomenon)
- CoRoT-7b
- Interstellar travel
- Planetary habitability
