= Stéphane Udry =

Swiss astronomer

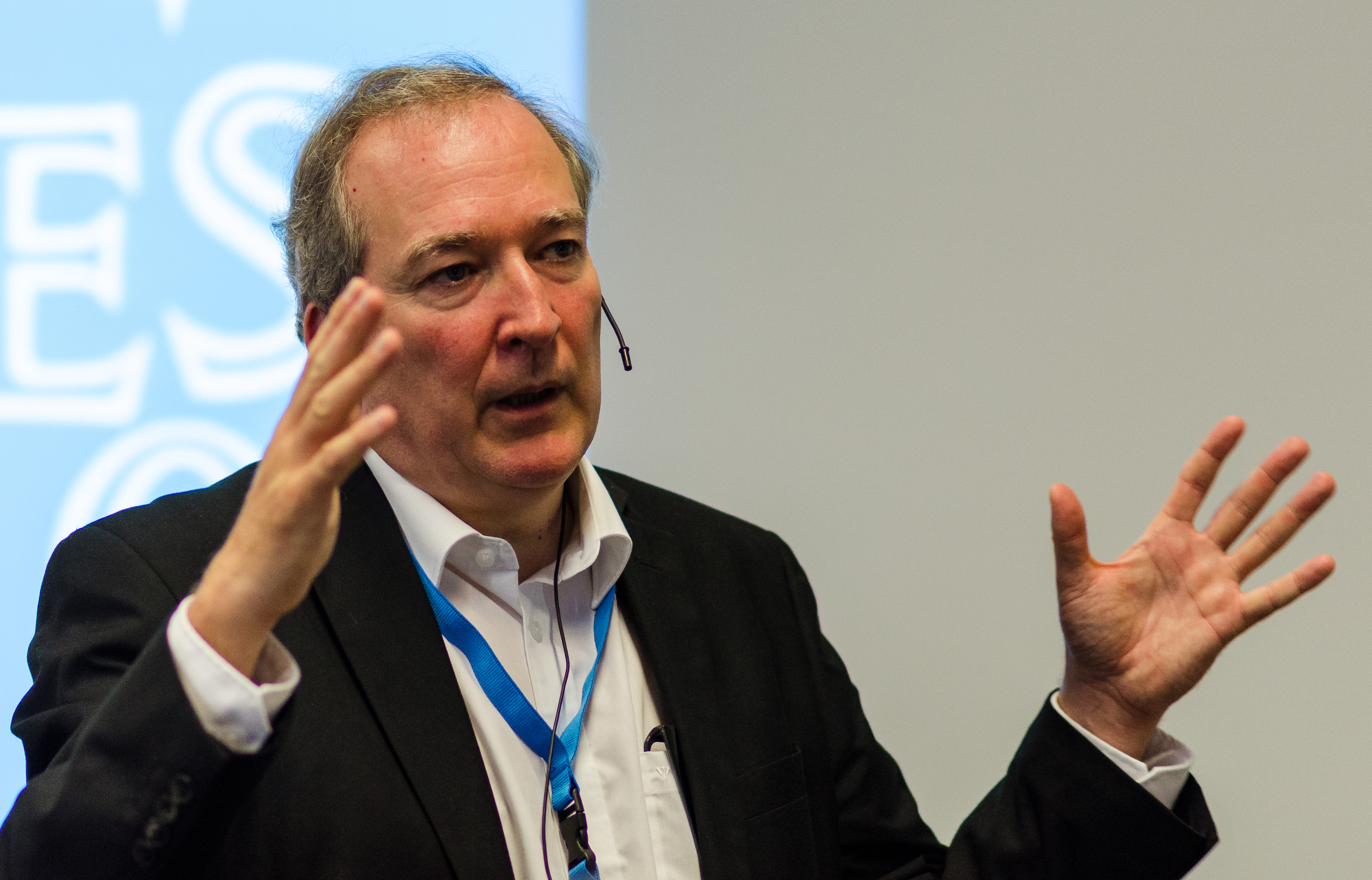
- Udry at the ESO@50 conference, Garching, Munich, September 2012
- Born: 1961 (age 64–65); Sion, Switzerland
- Occupation: Astronomer

Stéphane Udry (born 1961 in Sion, Switzerland) is an astronomer at the Geneva Observatory in Switzerland, whose current work is primarily the search for extra-solar planets. He and his team, in 2007, discovered a possibly terrestrial planet in the habitable zone of the Gliese 581 planetary system, approximately 20 light years away in the constellation Libra. He also led the observational team that discovered HD 85512 b, another most promisingly habitable exoplanet.

== Career ==
Udry earned a doctorate at the University of Geneva in 1992, and spent two years at Rutgers University in New Jersey. Later, Udry returned to Geneva, and worked with Michel Mayor, the discoverer of 51 Pegasi b, the first extrasolar planet found revolving around a normal star. In 2007, Udry was appointed full professor in the faculty of natural sciences at the University of Geneva.

== Research ==
Udry's initial research concerned the dynamics of galaxies. His current work chiefly concerns the search for extra-solar planets by analyzing variations in the radial velocities of stars. Among them was Gliese 581c (announced April 25, 2007) which at the time, was the most likely candidate for habitability of any extrasolar planet discovered so far. The planet was discovered by analyzing data obtained by the High Accuracy Radial Velocity Planet Searcher (HARPS) on the European Southern Observatory's 3.6 meter telescope at La Silla Observatory in Chile.

He was interviewed by Mat Kaplan on Planetary Radio. Udry described a new instrument known as the Echelle Spectrography for Rocky Exoplanet and Stable Spectroscopic Observations, dubbed ESPRESSO, might allow astronomers to detect Earth-like planets within five to ten years from 2010.

An upgraded HARPS, of which Udry lead the observational team, found evidence that Gliese 581d might be more habitable (rather than c or g), and also detected another promising candidate: HD 85512 b.

== See also ==
- Euler Telescope
- Next-Generation Transit Survey
