= Gliese 581 =

Star in the constellation Libra

- Location of Gliese 581 in the constellation Libra

Observation data Epoch J2000.0 Equinox ICRS
- Constellation: Libra
- Right ascension: 15^{h} 19^{m} 26.82694^{s}
- Declination: −07° 43′ 20.1895″
- Apparent magnitude (V): 10.56 to 10.58 (Note: Gliese 581 is classified as a BY Draconis variable in the General Catalogue of Variable Stars. This catalog gives a maximum magnitude of 10.56 and minimum of magnitude 10.58 for a relatively low 20 mmag (0.020 magnitudes) variability. For full data see data description and "The combined table of GCVS Vols I-III and NL 67-78 with improved coordinates, General Catalogue of Variable Stars". Sternberg Astronomical Institute. Archived from the original on 20 June 2017.)

Characteristics
- Evolutionary stage: Main sequence
- Spectral type: M3V
- B−V color index: 1.61
- Variable type: BY Dra (Note: In 1994 Edward Weis concluded that Gliese 581, like half the 43 dwarf M stars he studied over a multi-year period, showed long term variability (and page 1137, Fig 1 shows Gliese 581 had magnitude 10.58 in 1982 and between 10.57 and 10.56 from 1985 to 1990). Bonfils noted in 2005 that Gliese 581 "has been classified as a variable star (HO Lib), but its variability (Weis 1994) is only marginally significant. If real it would be on a time scale of several years, with short term variability being at most ~0.006 mag." Measurements by MOST showed short term variability of about 5 mmag (half a percent) over a period of a few weeks.)

Astrometry
| Radial velocity (R_{v}) | −9.75±0.16 km/s |
| Proper motion (μ) | RA: −1221.278(37) mas/yr Dec.: −97.229(27) mas/yr |
| Parallax (π) | 158.7183±0.0301 mas |
| Distance | 20.549 ± 0.004 ly (6.300 ± 0.001 pc) |
| Absolute magnitude (M_{V}) | 11.6 |

Details
| Mass | 0.295±0.010 M_{☉} |
| Radius | 0.302±0.005 R_{☉} |
| Luminosity (bolometric) | 0.012365(68) L_{☉} |
| Luminosity (visual, L_{V}) | 0.002 (Note: Taking the absolute magnitude of Gliese 581, $\begin{smallmatrix}M_{V_{\ast}}=11.59\end{smallmatrix}$, with the absolute magnitude of the Sun, $\begin{smallmatrix}M_{V_{\odot}}=4.83\end{smallmatrix}$, the visual luminosity can be calculated from, $\begin{smallmatrix}\frac{L_{V_{\ast}}}{L_{V_{\odot}}}=10^{0.4\left(M_{V_{\odot}} - M_{V_{\ast}}\right)}\end{smallmatrix}$ .) L_{☉} |
| Surface gravity (log g) | 4.97±0.11 cgs |
| Temperature | 3,500±26 K |
| Metallicity [Fe/H] | −0.08±0.07 dex |
| Rotation | 132.5±6.3 d or 148.1±0.9 d |
| Rotational velocity (v sin i) | <2.0 km/s |
| Age | 9.5±1.5 Gyr |

Other designations
- HO Lib, BD−07 4003, GJ 581, HIP 74995, LFT 1195, LHS 394, LPM 564, LTT 6112, NLTT 39886, Wolf 562, TIC 36853511, TYC 5594-1093-1

Database references
| SIMBAD | The star |
- e
- b
- c
- d
- f (artifact)
- g
| Exoplanet Archive | data |
| ARICNS | data |

Gliese 581 (/ˈɡliːzə/) is a red dwarf star of spectral type M3V which hosts a planetary system, 20.5 light-years (6.3 parsecs) away from Earth in the constellation Libra. Its estimated mass is about a third of that of the Sun, and it is the 101st closest known star system to the Sun. Gliese 581 is one of the oldest, least active M dwarfs known. Its low stellar activity improves the likelihood of its three planets retaining significant atmospheres, and lessens the sterilizing impact of stellar flares.

== History of observations ==
Gliese 581 is known at least from 1886, when it was included in Eduard Schönfeld's Southern Durchmusterung (SD)—the fourth part of the Bonner Durchmusterung. The corresponding designation is BD−07 4003.

== Characteristics ==
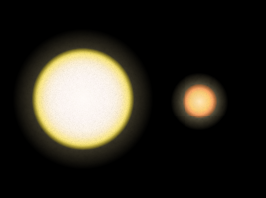
Size of the Sun (left) and Gliese 581 (right)

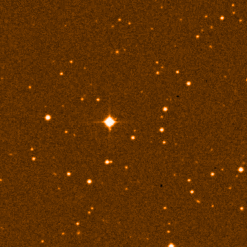
The star

The name Gliese 581 refers to the catalog number from the 1957 survey Gliese Catalogue of Nearby Stars of 965 stars located within 20 parsecs of the Earth. Other names of this star include BD−07°4003 (BD catalogue, first known publication) and HO Librae (variable star designation). It does not have an individual name such as Sirius or Procyon. The star is a red dwarf with spectral type M3V, located 20.5 light-years (6.3 parsecs) away from Earth. It is located about two degrees north of Beta Librae, the brightest star in the Libra constellation. Its mass is estimated to be approximately a third that of the Sun, and it is the 101st closest known star system (including brown dwarfs) to the Sun.

An M-class dwarf star such as Gliese 581 has a much lower mass than the Sun, causing the core region of the star to fuse hydrogen at a significantly lower rate. From the apparent magnitude and distance, astronomers have estimated an effective temperature of 3200 K and a visual luminosity of 0.2% of that of the Sun. However, a red dwarf such as Gliese 581 radiates primarily in the near infrared, with peak emission at a wavelength of roughly 830 nm (estimated using Wien's displacement law, which assumes the star radiates as a black body), so such an estimate will underestimate the star's total luminosity. (For comparison, the peak emission of the Sun is roughly 530 nm, in the middle of the visible part of the spectrum.) When radiation over the entire spectrum is taken into account (not just the part that humans are able to see), something known as the bolometric correction, this star has a bolometric luminosity 1.2% of the Sun's total luminosity. A planet would need to be situated much closer to this star in order to receive a comparable amount of energy as the Earth. The region of space around a star where a planet would receive roughly the same energy as the Earth is sometimes termed the "Goldilocks Zone", or, more prosaically, the habitable zone. The extent of such a zone is not fixed and is highly specific for each planetary system. Gliese 581 is a very old star. Its slow rotation makes it very inactive, making it better suited than most red dwarfs for having habitable planets.

Gliese 581 is classified as a variable star of the BY Draconis type, and has been given the variable star designation HO Librae. This is a star that exhibits variability because of the presence of star spots combined with the rotation of the star. However, the measured variability is close to the margin of error, and, if real, is most likely a long term variability. Its brightness is stable to 1%. Gliese 581 emits X-rays.

== Planetary system ==
The Gliese 581 planetary system
| Companion (in order from star) | Mass | Semimajor axis (AU) | Orbital period (days) | Eccentricity | Inclination (°) | Radius |
|---|---|---|---|---|---|---|
| e | 2.48+0.70 −0.42 M_{🜨} | 0.02799±0.0003 | 3.1481±0.0004 | 0.012+0.015 −0.008 | 47+15 −13 | — |
| b | 20.5+6.2 −3.5 M_{🜨} | 0.0399±0.0005 | 5.3686±0.0001 | 0.0342+0.009 −0.010 | 47+15 −13 | — |
| c | 6.81+0.21 −1.16 M_{🜨} | 0.0718+0.0008 −0.0009 | 12.9211+0.0008 −0.0007 | 0.032+0.027 −0.021 | 47+15 −13 | — |
| Debris disk | 25 ± 12 AU–>60 AU | | | | 30° – 70° | — |

The Gliese 581 planetary system is the gravitationally bound system comprising the star Gliese 581 and the objects that orbit it. The system is known to consist of at least three planets discovered using the radial velocity method, along with a debris disk. The system's notability is due primarily to early exoplanetology discoveries, between 2008 and 2010, of possible terrestrial planets orbiting within its habitable zone and the system's relatively close proximity to the Solar System at 20 light years away. However, its observation history has been controversial due to false detections, and the radial velocity method yields little information about the planets themselves beyond their orbit and mass.

The confirmed planets are believed to be located close to the star with near-circular orbits. In order of distance from the star, these are Gliese 581e, Gliese 581b, and Gliese 581c. The letters represent the discovery order, with b being the first planet to be discovered around the star.

=== Observation history ===
The first announcement of a planet around the star was Gliese 581b discovered by astronomers at the Observatory of Geneva in Switzerland and Grenoble University in France. Detected in August 2005 and using extensive data from the ESO/HARPS spectrometer it was the fifth planet to be discovered around a red dwarf. Further observations by the same group resulted in the detection of two more planets, Gliese 581c and Gliese 581d. The orbital period of Gliese 581d was originally thought to be 83 days but was later revised to a lower value of 67 days. The revised orbital distance would place it at the outer limits of the habitable zone, the distance at which it is believed possible for liquid water to exist on the surface of a planetary body, given favourable atmospheric conditions. Gliese 581d was estimated to receive about 30% of the intensity of light the Earth receives from the Sun. By comparison, sunlight on Mars has about 40% of the intensity of that on Earth, though if high levels of carbon dioxide are present in the planetary atmosphere, the greenhouse effect could keep temperatures above freezing.

The next discovery was the inner planet Gliese 581e, also by the Observatory of Geneva and using data from the HARPS instrument, was announced on 21 April 2009. This planet, at a minimum mass of 1.9 Earths, was at the time the least massive confirmed exoplanet identified around a main-sequence star.

On 29 September 2010, astronomers using the Keck Observatory proposed two additional planets, Gliese 581f and Gliese 581g, both in nearly circular orbits based on analysis of a combination of data sets from the HARPS and HIRES instruments. The proposed planet Gliese 581f was thought to be a 7 Earth-mass planet in a 433-day orbit and too cold to support liquid water. The candidate planet Gliese 581g attracted more attention: nicknamed Zarmina's World by one of its discoverers, the predicted mass of Gliese 581g was between 3 and 4 Earth-masses, with an orbital period of 37 days. The orbital distance was calculated to be well within the star's habitable zone, though the planet was expected to be tidally locked with one side of the planet always facing the star. In an interview with Lisa-Joy Zgorski of the National Science Foundation, Steven Vogt was asked what he thought about the chances of life existing on Gliese 581g. Vogt was optimistic: "I'm not a biologist, nor do I want to play one on TV. Personally, given the ubiquity and propensity of life to flourish wherever it can, I would say that ... the chances of life on this planet are 100%. I have almost no doubt about it."

Two weeks after the announcement of the discovery of Gliese 581f and Gliese 581g, astronomer Francesco Pepe of the Geneva Observatory reported that in a new analysis of 179 measurements taken by the HARPS spectrograph over 6.5 years, neither planet g nor planet f was detectable, and the relevant measurements were included in a paper uploaded to the arXiv preprint server, though still unpublished in a refereed journal. The non-existence of Gliese 581f was accepted relatively quickly: it was shown that the radial velocity variations that led to the claimed discovery of Gliese 581f were instead associated with the stellar activity cycle rather than an orbiting planet. Nevertheless, the existence of planet g remained controversial: Vogt responded in the media that he stood by the discovery and questions arose as to whether the effect was due to the assumption of circular rather than eccentric orbits or the statistical methods used.

Bayesian analysis found no clear evidence for a fifth planetary signal in the combined HIRES/HARPS data set, though other studies led to the conclusion that the data did support the existence of planet g, albeit with strong degeneracies in the parameters as a result of the first eccentric harmonic with the outer planet Gliese 581d.

On 27 November 2012, the European Space Agency announced that the Herschel space observatory had discovered a comet belt "at 25 ± 12 AU to more than 60 AU". It must have "at least 10 times" as many comets as does the Solar system. This likely rules out Saturn-mass planets beyond 0.75 AU. However another (undiscovered) planet further out, say a Neptune-mass planet at 5 AU, might be required to keep the comet belt replenished.

Using the assumption that the noise present in the data was correlated (red noise rather than white noise), Roman Baluev called into question not only the existence of planet g, but Gliese 581d as well, suggesting there were only three planets (Gliese 581b, c, and e) present. This result was further supported by a 2014 study, whose authors argued that Gliese 581d is "an artifact of stellar activity which, when incompletely corrected, causes the false detection of the planet g." While a response was published questioning the methodology of this study, all subsequent studies of the radial velocity data have confirmed the stellar, rather than planetary, origin of the signal corresponding to Gliese 581d, though some dispute has remained.

A 2024 study, in addition to confirming evidence for a three-planet system, determined the orbital inclination of the planets. This allowed their true masses to be determined; previously only minimum masses were known. The planets' true masses are about 30% greater than their minimum masses.

=== Planets ===
The orbits of the Gliese 581 planetary system, based on a 2009 study which proposed a four-planet model (e, b, c, d). In the picture, Gliese 581c is the third planet from the star.

Analysis of the radial velocity data has produced several models for the orbital arrangement of the system. 3-planet, 4-planet, 5-planet and 6-planet models have been proposed to address the available radial velocity data, with the current consensus being a 3-planet model (e, b, c). Most of these models predict, however, that the inner planets are close in with circular orbits, while outer planets, particularly Gliese 581d, should it exist, are on more elliptical orbits.

Models of the habitable zone of Gliese 581 show that it extends from about 0.1 to 0.25 AU. The three confirmed planets orbit closer to the star than the inner edge of the habitable zone, while planets g and d would have orbited within it.

==== Gliese 581e ====
Gliese 581e is the innermost planet and, with a mass of 2.5 Earth masses, is the least massive of the three. Discovered in 2009, it is also the most recent confirmed planet to have been discovered in this system. It takes 3.15 days to complete an orbit. Initial analyses suggested that the planet's orbit is quite elliptical but after correcting the radial velocity measurements for stellar activity, the data now indicate a circular orbit.

==== Gliese 581b ====
Gliese 581b is the most massive planet known to be orbiting Gliese 581 and was the first to be discovered. It is about 20 times the mass of Earth and completes an orbit in 5.37 days.

==== Gliese 581c ====
Gliese 581c is the third planet orbiting Gliese 581. It was discovered in April 2007. In their 2007 paper, Udry et al. asserted that if Gliese 581c has an Earth-type composition, it would have a radius of 1.5R_{🜨}, which would have made it at the time "the most Earth-like of all known exoplanets". A direct measurement of the radius cannot be taken because, viewed from Earth, the planet does not transit its star. The mass of the planet is 6.8 times that of Earth. The planet initially attracted attention as being potentially habitable, though this has since been discounted. The mean blackbody surface temperature has been estimated to lie between −3 °C (for a Venus-like albedo) and 40 °C (for an Earth-like albedo), however, the temperatures could be much higher (about 500 degrees Celsius) due to a runaway greenhouse effect akin to that of Venus. It has been hypothesized that the system may have undergone planetary migration and Gliese 581c may have formed beyond the frost line, with a composition similar to icy bodies like Ganymede. Gliese 581c completes a full orbit in just under 13 days.

==== Doubtful and disproven planets ====
===== Gliese 581g =====
Gliese 581g, unofficially known as Zarmina's World, was a candidate exoplanet claimed to orbit Gliese 581, but its existence was ultimately refuted. It was thought to orbit with a period of 36.6 days at a distance of 0.146 AU, placing it within the habitable zone, and to have a minimum mass of 3.1 M_{🜨}.

===== Gliese 581d =====
Gliese 581d is a possible candidate exoplanet thought to orbit Gliese 581, which is frequently heavily disputed, as it has been argued by a number of studies to be a false positive originating from stellar activity. The planet's minimum mass is thought to be 6.98 M_{🜨} and its radius, assuming an Earth-like composition, is estimated (assuming the planet's existence) to be 2.2 R_{🜨}, making it a super-Earth. Its orbital period is thought to be 66.87 days long, with a semi-major axis of 0.21847 AU, with an unconstrained eccentricity. Previous analyses suggested that the planet (if existing) orbits within the star's habitable zone, where the temperatures are just right to support life.

===== Gliese 581f =====
Gliese 581f was a candidate exoplanet claimed to orbit Gliese 581, but its existence was ultimately refuted. It was thought to orbit with a period of 433 days at a distance of 0.758 AU, and to have a minimum mass of 7.0 M_{🜨}.

=== SETI ===
The Gliese 581 system has been the target of both SETI and Active SETI searches for extraterrestrial life. A Message from Earth (AMFE) is a high-powered digital radio signal that was sent on 9 October 2008, toward Gliese 581c. The signal is a digital time capsule containing 501 messages that were selected through a competition on the social networking site Bebo. The message was sent using the Yevpatoria RT-70 radio telescope radar telescope of the National Space Agency of Ukraine. The signal will reach Gliese 581 in early 2029.

Using optical SETI, Ragbir Bhathal claimed to have detected an unexplained pulse of light from the direction of the Gliese 581 system in 2008.

In 2012, the International Centre for Radio Astronomy Research at Curtin University in Perth, Gliese 581 was precisely targeted by Australian Long Baseline Array using three radio telescope facilities across Australia and the Very Long Baseline Interferometry technique, however no candidate signals were found.

=== Debris disk ===
At the outer edge of the system is a massive debris disk containing more comets than the Solar System. The debris disc has an inclination between 30° and 70°. If the planetary orbits lie in the same plane, their masses would be between 1.1 and 2 times the minimum mass values. (Note: The radial velocity method allows the determination of the minimum mass which is the product of the true mass with the sine of the orbital inclination, denoted m sin i. In general the inclination is unknown. For a given inclination, the true mass is therefore the minimum mass multiplied by 1/sin i.) This is supported by a 2024 study, which found an inclination for the planetary orbits of about 47°.

== See also ==
- Habitability of red dwarf systems
- Lists of exoplanets
- Gliese 876
