= Steven S. Vogt =

American astronomer of German descent (born 1949)

- Born: December 20, 1949 (age 76); Rock Island, Illinois, U.S.
- Education: University of California, Berkeley (A.B., Physics, 1972, A.B., Astronomy, 1972); University of Texas at Austin (M.S., Astronomy, 1976, Ph.D., Astronomy, 1978)
- Known for: discovery of Gliese 581 g
- Scientific career
- Fields: Astronomical instrumentation; Optical design; High-dispersion spectroscopy; Exoplanet hunting
- Workplaces: University of California, Santa Cruz; UCO/Lick Observatory
- Doctoral students: Geoffrey Marcy

Steven Scott Vogt (born December 20, 1949) is an American astronomer of German descent whose main interest is the search for exoplanets.

He is credited, along with R. Paul Butler, for discovering Gliese 581 g, the first potentially habitable planet outside of the Solar System. However, Gliese 581 g was later found to be a false positive.

He is a professor of astronomy and astrophysics at the University of California, Santa Cruz, and is known worldwide for designing and building HIRES, a high-resolution optical spectrometer mounted permanently on the W. M. Keck Observatory 10-meter telescope on Mauna Kea, Hawaii. HIRES is an instrument critical to observations and discoveries about the planets, stars, galaxies, and the universe. Vogt also built the Hamilton spectrometer at Lick Observatory (with which most of the first extrasolar planets were discovered). In 1987, earlier in his career, Vogt invented the technique of "Doppler imaging" for mapping the surface features of stars.

Vogt is currently a member of the California-Carnegie Planet Search Team. This team is building a new telescope in the Lick Observatory, the Automated Planet Finder, expected to be the most powerful in the world for detecting extrasolar planets. It will be able to track planets moving at velocities as little as 1 meter per second (the speed of a walking man). Vogt and his team are credited with detecting a majority of the 100 planets now known.

Vogt received his bachelor's degrees in Physics and Astronomy from the University of California, Berkeley, in 1972, his Master of Science degree in Astronomy from UT Austin in 1976, and Ph.D in Astronomy from UT Austin in 1978.

He's been a member of the University of California Observatories (UCO) at Lick Observatory since 1978.

== Planets discovered ==
- 55 Cancri f, with coauthors Debra Fischer, Paul Butler, Geoffrey Marcy (Vogt's first graduate student ), et al., published by Science Daily, 6 November 2007.
- the controverted Gliese 581 g planet, with co-investigator Paul Butler, 29 September 2010.

== Prizes ==
- 1983
  - Bergmann Memorial Award, for Vogt's High Speed Observations of Be Stars Associated with X-Ray Sources.
- 1995
  - Maria and Eric Muhlmann Award - The award for recent observations using innovative advances in astronomical instrumentation, software, or observational infrastructure.
- 2002
  - Beatrice M. Tinsley Prize, for Vogt, Geoffrey Marcy, and Paul Butler on their Pioneering work in characterizing planetary systems orbiting distant stars.
  - Carl Sagan Memorial Award - The award for an individual who has demonstrated leadership in research or policies advancing exploration of the Cosmos.

== Books ==
- Steven Scott Vogt. A magnetic study of the spotted UV Ceti flare stars and related late-type dwarfs. s.n., 1978.
- Steven Scott Vogt. HIRES, a high resolution echelle spectrometer for the Keck ten-meter telescope: phase C, HIRES core - Issue 57 of Lick Observatory technical reports. University of California Observatories/Lick Observatory, 1991
- Steven Scott Vogt. HIRES user's manual - Issue 67 of Lick Observatory technical reports. Lick Observatory, 1994.
- Steven Scott Vogt. A thorium-argon line atlas for the Keck HIRES spectrometer - Issue 88 of Lick Observatory technical reports. Lick Observatory, 1999.

== See also ==
- Discoveries of extrasolar planets
- Radial velocity
- Science Buddies
