= Gliese 581e =

Exoplanet orbiting Gliese 581

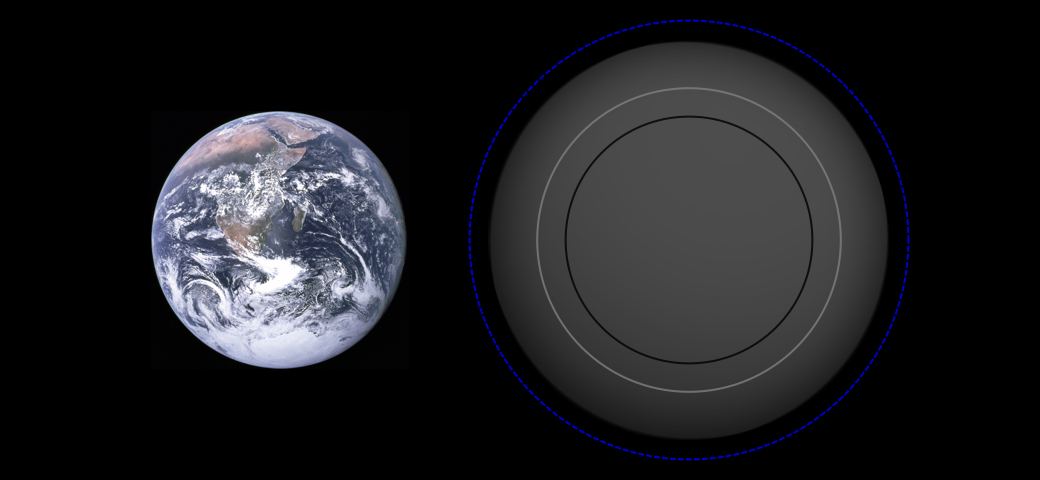
- Size comparison of Gliese 581e with Earth (Based on selected hypothetical modeled compositions) (Note: The estimated range of sizes in this image from 2009 is based on the planet's minimum mass. Since the true mass is now known to be somewhat greater, the sizes may be underestimated.)

Discovery
- Discovered by: Mayor et al.
- Discovery site: La Silla Observatory, Chile
- Discovery date: 21 April 2009
- Detection method: Radial velocity

Orbital characteristics
- Semi-major axis: 0.02799±0.0003 AU
- Eccentricity: 0.012+0.015 −0.008
- Orbital period (sidereal): 3.1481±0.0004 d
- Inclination: 47°+15° −13°
- Time of periastron: 2454752.33 ± 0.05
- Argument of periastron: 226°+91° −55°
- Semi-amplitude: 1.8±0.1 m/s
- Star: Gliese 581

Physical characteristics
- Mass: 2.48+0.70 −0.42 M_{🜨}

Gliese 581e /ˈɡliːzə/ or Gl 581e is an exoplanet orbiting within the Gliese 581 system, located 20.5 light-years (6.3 parsecs) away from Earth in the constellation Libra. It is the third planet discovered in the system (fourth if the disputed planet candidate Gliese 581d is included) and the first in order from the star.

== Discovery ==
The planet was discovered by an Observatory of Geneva team led by Michel Mayor, using the HARPS instrument on the European Southern Observatory 3.6 m (140 in) telescope in La Silla, Chile. The discovery was announced on 21 April 2009. Mayor's team employed the radial velocity technique, in which the orbit size and mass of a planet are determined based on the small perturbations it induces in its parent star's orbit via gravity.

== Characteristics ==
With a minimum mass of about 1.9 Earth masses, Gliese 581e was the least massive exoplanet known around a normal star at the time of discovery in 2009, with only PSR B1257+12 A being less massive. A 2024 study determined the orbital inclination of the planet, allowing its true mass to be determined, which is about 30% greater than the minimum mass at about 2.5 Earth masses.

Gliese 581e completes an orbit around its parent star in 3.15 days. At an orbital distance of just 0.028 AU (4,200,000 km) from its parent star, it orbits further in than the habitable zone. Although scientists think it probably has a rocky surface similar to Earth, it is also likely to experience intense tidal heating similar to (and likely more intense than) that affecting Jupiter's moon Io.

== See also ==
- Habitability of red dwarf systems
