= R. Paul Butler =

American astronomer

Robert Paul Butler
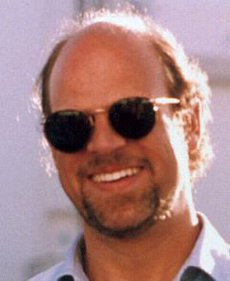
- Born: April 1960 (age 66); San Diego, California
- Education: San Francisco State University, University of Maryland, College Park
- Scientific career
- Fields: Astronomy
- Workplaces: San Francisco State University, Anglo-Australian Observatory, Carnegie Institution for Science

External media

Audio
- The search for exoplanets, Adam Levy, Knowable Magazine, February 15, 2022

Video
- Paul Butler and the Search for Habitable Planets, Carnegie Science, January 9, 2013

Robert Paul Butler (born April 1960) is an astronomer and staff scientist at the Carnegie Institution for Science in Washington, D.C., who searches for extrasolar planets.

As of November 2020, he and his team had discovered over half of the planets found orbiting nearby stars. He is noted for his pioneering work in Doppler spectroscopy, a method used to detect stars having orbiting planets by measuring the "wobble" induced by the gravitational forces between the star and its orbiting planet(s).

== Early life and education ==
Butler was born in April 1960 in San Diego, California. Even as a boy, he was interested in astronomy. When he was 14, he built an 8-inch reflector telescope and began looking at planets and stars. He was fascinated by early astronomers and cosmologists like Galileo and Giordano Bruno, who dared to speculate about multiple worlds at a time when such ideas were considered heresy. As a high school student in 1977, he learned techniques of orbit calculation when he attended the Summer Science Program at his school.

Butler went on to receive a BA (physics, 1985), a BS (chemistry, 1986) and an MS (physics, 1989) from San Francisco State University, completing his Master's thesis with Geoffrey Marcy. During this time, he began work on the design of a very sensitive spectrograph, seeking to detect extrasolar planets by detecting variations in the radial velocity of their parent stars.

Butler received his Ph.D. in astronomy in 1993 from the University of Maryland College of Computer, Mathematical, and Natural Sciences in College Park, Maryland.

== Career ==
While Butler was still working on his master's degree, he and Marcy developed a spectrographic apparatus capable of detecting the tiny gravitational effects of a planet on its host star. By viewing the starlight they measured through a glass absorption cell containing molecular iodine, they obtained a reference set of spectral lines with sufficient precision to identify the changing light waves caused by a stellar wobble. After completing his Ph.D., Butler returned to San Francisco State University to work with Marcy. Butler was a research scientist there and a visiting research fellow at the University of California, Berkeley from 1993 to 1997.

In 1995, Marcy and Butler used their Doppler velocity measurement equipment to confirm the discovery by Michel Mayor and Didier Queloz, of the first true exoplanet to be unequivocally identified orbiting a main sequence star, 51 Pegasi b. Its characteristics were so unexpected that researchers re-examined their assumptions and their data.

In 1996 Marcy and Butler became the first Americans to discover a new planetary system, a planet orbiting 70 Virginis. The planet was detected using radial velocity measurements taken with the C. Donald Shane telescope at Lick Observatory. They went on to find 70 of the first 100 exoplanets to be discovered.

In 1997 Butler became a staff astronomer at the Anglo-Australian Observatory in Sydney, Australia, leading the Anglo-Australian Planet Search. After thirty years of research into exoplanets, few systems have been found that resemble the Solar System.

Since 1999, Butler has been a staff scientist at the Carnegie Institution for Science in Washington, D.C. As of 2001, his expressed goal was "to survey all 2,000 Sun-like stars out to 150 light-years."

== Awards ==
Marcy and Butler have shared a number of prizes including the inaugural Bioastronomy Medal of the International Astronomical Union in 1997. In 2001, Butler and Marcy were awarded the Henry Draper Medal from the National Academy of Sciences "for their pioneering investigations of planets orbiting other stars via high-precision radial velocities." The Carnegie Planet Search Team, consisting of Marcy, Butler, Steven Vogt and Debra Fischer received the Carl Sagan Award from the American Astronautical Society and the Planetary Society in 2002. Butler received the Beatrice Tinsley Prize of the American Astronomical Society with Marcy and Vogt in 2002. Marcy and Butler were named Discover Magazine's "Space Scientists of the Year" in 2003.

In 2011, Butler was elected to the American Academy of Arts and Sciences for his work in developing the precision Doppler velocity technique, "the most precise method to date" for observing planets that orbit nearby stars, and for his many discoveries of such stars. Butler was credited with a "central role" in changing "the way we look at our place in the universe."

== Bibliography ==
- Butler, R. Paul (2006). "Catalog of Nearby Exoplanets" (PDF). Astrophysical Journal. 646 (2–3): 25–33. arXiv:astro-ph/0607493. Bibcode:2006ApJ...646..505B. doi:10.1086/504701. hdl:2299/1103. S2CID 119067572.
- Marcy, Geoffrey W.; Butler, R. Paul (September 1, 1998). "Detection of extrasolar giant planets". Annual Review of Astronomy and Astrophysics. 36 (1): 57–97. Bibcode:1998ARA&A..36...57M. doi:10.1146/annurev.astro.36.1.57. ISSN 0066-4146.

== See also ==
- List of stars with confirmed planets
