= HD 85512 =

Star in the constellation Vela

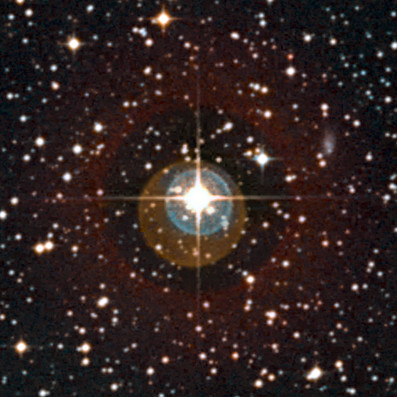
- HD 85512 imaged by the Digitized Sky Survey

Observation data Epoch J2000 Equinox ICRS
- Constellation: Vela
- Right ascension: 09^{h} 51^{m} 07.05180^{s}
- Declination: −43° 30′ 10.0237″
- Apparent magnitude (V): 7.66

Characteristics
- Evolutionary stage: main sequence
- Spectral type: K6V
- U−B color index: 1.12
- B−V color index: 1.18
- V−R color index: 0.71

Astrometry
Radial velocity (R_{v})	−9.78±0.12 km/s
Proper motion (μ)	RA: 461.603 mas/yr Dec.: −471.880 mas/yr
Parallax (π)	88.6737±0.0173 mas
Distance	36.782 ± 0.007 ly (11.277 ± 0.002 pc)
Absolute magnitude (M_{V})	7.39

Details
Mass	0.69 M_{☉}
Radius	0.533 ± 0.04 (Note: From $R = \sqrt \frac{L} {4 \pi \sigma T_{\rm eff} ^4}$, where $R$ is the radius, $L$ is the luminosity, $T_{\rm eff}$ is the effective surface temperature and $\sigma$ is the Stefan–Boltzmann constant.) R_{☉}
Luminosity (bolometric)	0.126 ± 0.008 L_{☉}
Surface gravity (log g)	4.604±0.017 cgs
Temperature	4404±10 K
Metallicity	([Si/H] dex) -0.02
Metallicity [Fe/H]	-0.28 dex
Rotation	47.13 ± 6.98
Rotational velocity (v sin i)	2.194±0.118 km/s
Age	5.61 ± 0.61 Gyr

Other designations
- CD−42°5678, GJ 370, HD 85512, HIP 48331, LHS 2201, 2MASS J09510700-4330097, Gaia DR2 5412947081287925504

Database references
SIMBAD	data

HD 85512 is a solitary K-type main-sequence star 36.8 light-years (11.3 parsecs) away in the constellation Vela. It is about 1 billion years older than the Sun. It is extremely chromospherically inactive, only slightly more active than Tau Ceti. It exhibits a long-term variability and was thought to host one low-mass planet, although this is now doubtful.

== Proposed planetary system ==
On August 19, 2011, a ≥3.6 Earth-mass planet was discovered using HARPS that is "just inside" the habitable zone, along with the inner planets of e (or 82 G.) Eridani, and HD 192310 c in Capricornus. These two other systems are closer to Earth than this system. Modelling at the time of the discovery announcement found that the planet could be cool enough to host liquid water if it has more than 50% cloud coverage, but with revised models of the habitable zone two years later it was found to be too hot to be potentially habitable. For a time it ranked fifth-best for habitability in the Planetary Habitability Laboratory's Habitable Exoplanets Catalog, which later listed it in an article about "false starts" in the search for potentially habitable exoplanets.

In 2023, a study reassessed the radial velocity data of HD 85512. A signal was detected with a period of 51 days, inconsistent with the previously published 58-day orbital period of HD 85512 b, but consistent with previous estimates of the stellar rotation period. This indicates that the signal is very likely to be caused by the stellar rotation, rather than an orbiting planet. Due to this, the NASA Exoplanet Archive now considers this planet as a false positive detection. A 2026 study concluded that the radial velocity variations are indeed attributable to stellar activity.
