= Hercules in Chinese astronomy =

According to traditional Chinese uranography, the modern constellation Hercules is located in Three Enclosures (三垣, Sān Yuán)

The name of the western constellation in modern Chinese is 武仙座 (wǔ xiān zuò), which means "the immortal martial constellation".

== Stars ==
The map of Chinese constellation in constellation Hercules area consists of :

| Four Symbols | Mansion (Chinese name) | Romanization | Translation | Asterisms (Chinese name) | Romanization | Translation | Western star name | Proper Name | Chinese star name | Romanization | Translation |
|---|---|---|---|---|---|---|---|---|---|---|---|
Three Enclosures (三垣)
| Three Enclosures (三垣) | 紫微垣 | Zǐ Wēi Yuán | Purple Forbidden enclosure | 天棓 | Tiānbàng | Celestial Flail | | | | | |
| Three Enclosures (三垣) | 紫微垣 | Zǐ Wēi Yuán | Purple Forbidden enclosure | 天棓 | Tiānbàng | Celestial Flail | ι Her | Tianbang | 天棓五 | Tiānbàngwǔ | 5th star |
| Three Enclosures (三垣) | 紫微垣 | Zǐ Wēi Yuán | Purple Forbidden enclosure | 天棓 | Tiānbàng | Celestial Flail | 88 Her | | 天棓增三 | Tiānbàngzēngsān | 3rd additional star |
| Three Enclosures (三垣) | 紫微垣 | Zǐ Wēi Yuán | Purple Forbidden enclosure | 天棓 | Tiānbàng | Celestial Flail | 82 Her | | 天棓增四 | Tiānbàngzēngsì | 4th additional star |
| Three Enclosures (三垣) | 紫微垣 | Zǐ Wēi Yuán | Purple Forbidden enclosure | 天棓 | Tiānbàng | Celestial Flail | 74 Her | | 天棓增七 | Tiānbàngzēngqī | 7th additional star |
| Three Enclosures (三垣) | 紫微垣 | Zǐ Wēi Yuán | Purple Forbidden enclosure | 天棓 | Tiānbàng | Celestial Flail | 77 Her | | 天棓增八 | Tiānbàngzēngbā | 8th additional star |
| Three Enclosures (三垣) | 天市垣 | Tiān Shì Yuán | Heavenly Market enclosure | 天市左垣 | Tiānshìzuǒyuán | Left Wall | | | | | |
| Three Enclosures (三垣) | 天市垣 | Tiān Shì Yuán | Heavenly Market enclosure | 天市左垣 | Tiānshìzuǒyuán | Left Wall | δ Her | Sarin (for component Aa) | | | |
| Three Enclosures (三垣) | 天市垣 | Tiān Shì Yuán | Heavenly Market enclosure | 天市左垣 | Tiānshìzuǒyuán | Left Wall | δ Her | Sarin (for component Aa) | 天市左垣一 | Tiānshìzuǒyuányī | 1st star |
| Three Enclosures (三垣) | 天市垣 | Tiān Shì Yuán | Heavenly Market enclosure | 天市左垣 | Tiānshìzuǒyuán | Left Wall | δ Her | Sarin (for component Aa) | 魏 | Wèi | (Star of) Wei |
| Three Enclosures (三垣) | 天市垣 | Tiān Shì Yuán | Heavenly Market enclosure | 天市左垣 | Tiānshìzuǒyuán | Left Wall | λ Her | Maasym | | | |
| Three Enclosures (三垣) | 天市垣 | Tiān Shì Yuán | Heavenly Market enclosure | 天市左垣 | Tiānshìzuǒyuán | Left Wall | λ Her | Maasym | 天市左垣二 | Tiānshìzuǒyuánèr | 2nd star |
| Three Enclosures (三垣) | 天市垣 | Tiān Shì Yuán | Heavenly Market enclosure | 天市左垣 | Tiānshìzuǒyuán | Left Wall | λ Her | Maasym | 趙 | Zhào | (Star of) Zhao |
| Three Enclosures (三垣) | 天市垣 | Tiān Shì Yuán | Heavenly Market enclosure | 天市左垣 | Tiānshìzuǒyuán | Left Wall | μ Her | | | | |
| Three Enclosures (三垣) | 天市垣 | Tiān Shì Yuán | Heavenly Market enclosure | 天市左垣 | Tiānshìzuǒyuán | Left Wall | μ Her | | 天市左垣三 | Tiānshìzuǒyuánsān | 3rd star |
| Three Enclosures (三垣) | 天市垣 | Tiān Shì Yuán | Heavenly Market enclosure | 天市左垣 | Tiānshìzuǒyuán | Left Wall | μ Her | | 九河 | Jiǔhé | (Star of) Jiuhe |
| Three Enclosures (三垣) | 天市垣 | Tiān Shì Yuán | Heavenly Market enclosure | 天市左垣 | Tiānshìzuǒyuán | Left Wall | ο Her | | | | |
| Three Enclosures (三垣) | 天市垣 | Tiān Shì Yuán | Heavenly Market enclosure | 天市左垣 | Tiānshìzuǒyuán | Left Wall | ο Her | | 天市左垣四 | Tiānshìzuǒyuánsì | 4th star |
| Three Enclosures (三垣) | 天市垣 | Tiān Shì Yuán | Heavenly Market enclosure | 天市左垣 | Tiānshìzuǒyuán | Left Wall | ο Her | | 中山 | Zhōngshān | (Star of) Zhongshan |
| Three Enclosures (三垣) | 天市垣 | Tiān Shì Yuán | Heavenly Market enclosure | 天市左垣 | Tiānshìzuǒyuán | Left Wall | 112 Her | | | | |
| Three Enclosures (三垣) | 天市垣 | Tiān Shì Yuán | Heavenly Market enclosure | 天市左垣 | Tiānshìzuǒyuán | Left Wall | 112 Her | | 天市左垣五 | Tiānshìzuǒyuánwu | 5th star |
| Three Enclosures (三垣) | 天市垣 | Tiān Shì Yuán | Heavenly Market enclosure | 天市左垣 | Tiānshìzuǒyuán | Left Wall | 112 Her | | 齊 | Qí | (Star of) Qi |
| Three Enclosures (三垣) | 天市垣 | Tiān Shì Yuán | Heavenly Market enclosure | 天市左垣 | Tiānshìzuǒyuán | Left Wall | 51 Her | | 魏增一 | Wèizēngyī | 1st additional star of Wei |
| Three Enclosures (三垣) | 天市垣 | Tiān Shì Yuán | Heavenly Market enclosure | 天市左垣 | Tiānshìzuǒyuán | Left Wall | 56 Her | | 魏增二 | Wèizēngèr | 2nd additional star of Wei |
| Three Enclosures (三垣) | 天市垣 | Tiān Shì Yuán | Heavenly Market enclosure | 天市左垣 | Tiānshìzuǒyuán | Left Wall | 57 Her | | 魏增三 | Wèizēngsān | 3rd additional star of Wei |
| Three Enclosures (三垣) | 天市垣 | Tiān Shì Yuán | Heavenly Market enclosure | 天市左垣 | Tiānshìzuǒyuán | Left Wall | HD 155025 | | 魏增四 | Wèizēngsì | 4th additional star of Wei |
| Three Enclosures (三垣) | 天市垣 | Tiān Shì Yuán | Heavenly Market enclosure | 天市左垣 | Tiānshìzuǒyuán | Left Wall | 62 Her | | 魏增五 | Wèizēngwǔ | 5th additional star of Wei |
| Three Enclosures (三垣) | 天市垣 | Tiān Shì Yuán | Heavenly Market enclosure | 天市左垣 | Tiānshìzuǒyuán | Left Wall | 70 Her | | 魏增六 | Wèizēngliù | 6th additional star of Wei |
| Three Enclosures (三垣) | 天市垣 | Tiān Shì Yuán | Heavenly Market enclosure | 天市左垣 | Tiānshìzuǒyuán | Left Wall | 73 Her | | 魏增八 | Wèizēngbā | 8th additional star of Wei |
| Three Enclosures (三垣) | 天市垣 | Tiān Shì Yuán | Heavenly Market enclosure | 天市左垣 | Tiānshìzuǒyuán | Left Wall | 78 Her | | 趙增一 | Zhàozēngyī | 1st additional star of Zhao |
| Three Enclosures (三垣) | 天市垣 | Tiān Shì Yuán | Heavenly Market enclosure | 天市左垣 | Tiānshìzuǒyuán | Left Wall | 79 Her | | 趙增二 | Zhàozēngèr | 2nd additional star of Zhao |
| Three Enclosures (三垣) | 天市垣 | Tiān Shì Yuán | Heavenly Market enclosure | 天市左垣 | Tiānshìzuǒyuán | Left Wall | 84 Her | | 趙增三 | Zhàozēngsān | 3rd additional star of Zhao |
| Three Enclosures (三垣) | 天市垣 | Tiān Shì Yuán | Heavenly Market enclosure | 天市左垣 | Tiānshìzuǒyuán | Left Wall | 87 Her | | 九河增一 | Jiǔhézēngyī | 1st additional star of Jiuhe |
| Three Enclosures (三垣) | 天市垣 | Tiān Shì Yuán | Heavenly Market enclosure | 天市左垣 | Tiānshìzuǒyuán | Left Wall | ξ Her | | 中山增一 | Zhōngshānzēngyī | 1st additional star of Zhongshan |
| Three Enclosures (三垣) | 天市垣 | Tiān Shì Yuán | Heavenly Market enclosure | 天市左垣 | Tiānshìzuǒyuán | Left Wall | ν Her | | 中山增二 | Zhōngshānzēngèr | 2nd additional star of Zhongshan |
| Three Enclosures (三垣) | 天市垣 | Tiān Shì Yuán | Heavenly Market enclosure | 天市左垣 | Tiānshìzuǒyuán | Left Wall | 99 Her | | 中山增三 | Zhōngshānzēngsān | 3rd additional star of Zhongshan |
| Three Enclosures (三垣) | 天市垣 | Tiān Shì Yuán | Heavenly Market enclosure | 天市左垣 | Tiānshìzuǒyuán | Left Wall | 104 Her | | 中山增四 | Zhōngshānzēngsì | 4th additional star of Zhongshan |
| Three Enclosures (三垣) | 天市垣 | Tiān Shì Yuán | Heavenly Market enclosure | 天市左垣 | Tiānshìzuǒyuán | Left Wall | 108 Her | | 中山增五 | Zhōngshānzēngwǔ | 5th additional star of Zhongshan |
| Three Enclosures (三垣) | 天市垣 | Tiān Shì Yuán | Heavenly Market enclosure | 天市左垣 | Tiānshìzuǒyuán | Left Wall | 107 Her | | 中山增六 | Zhōngshānzēngliù | 6th additional star of Zhongshan |
| Three Enclosures (三垣) | 天市垣 | Tiān Shì Yuán | Heavenly Market enclosure | 天市左垣 | Tiānshìzuǒyuán | Left Wall | 100 Her | | 中山增七 | Zhōngshānzēngqī | 7th additional star of Zhongshan |
| Three Enclosures (三垣) | 天市垣 | Tiān Shì Yuán | Heavenly Market enclosure | 天市左垣 | Tiānshìzuǒyuán | Left Wall | 113 Her | | 齊增一 | Qízēngyī | 1st additional star of Qi |
| Three Enclosures (三垣) | 天市垣 | Tiān Shì Yuán | Heavenly Market enclosure | 天市右垣 | Tiānshìyòuyuán | Right Wall | | | | | |
| Three Enclosures (三垣) | 天市垣 | Tiān Shì Yuán | Heavenly Market enclosure | 天市右垣 | Tiānshìyòuyuán | Right Wall | β Her | Kornephoros | | | |
| Three Enclosures (三垣) | 天市垣 | Tiān Shì Yuán | Heavenly Market enclosure | 天市右垣 | Tiānshìyòuyuán | Right Wall | β Her | Kornephoros | 天市右垣一 | Tiānshìyòuyuányī | 1st star |
| Three Enclosures (三垣) | 天市垣 | Tiān Shì Yuán | Heavenly Market enclosure | 天市右垣 | Tiānshìyòuyuán | Right Wall | β Her | Kornephoros | 河中 | Hézhōng | (Star of) Hezhong |
| Three Enclosures (三垣) | 天市垣 | Tiān Shì Yuán | Heavenly Market enclosure | 天市右垣 | Tiānshìyòuyuán | Right Wall | γ Her | | | | |
| Three Enclosures (三垣) | 天市垣 | Tiān Shì Yuán | Heavenly Market enclosure | 天市右垣 | Tiānshìyòuyuán | Right Wall | γ Her | | 天市右垣二 | Tiānshìyòuyuánèr | 2nd star |
| Three Enclosures (三垣) | 天市垣 | Tiān Shì Yuán | Heavenly Market enclosure | 天市右垣 | Tiānshìyòuyuán | Right Wall | γ Her | | 河間 | Héjiān | (Star of) Hejian region |
| Three Enclosures (三垣) | 天市垣 | Tiān Shì Yuán | Heavenly Market enclosure | 天市右垣 | Tiānshìyòuyuán | Right Wall | κ Her A | Marsic (for component A) | | | |
| Three Enclosures (三垣) | 天市垣 | Tiān Shì Yuán | Heavenly Market enclosure | 天市右垣 | Tiānshìyòuyuán | Right Wall | κ Her A | Marsic (for component A) | 天市右垣三 | Tiānshìyòuyuánsān | 3rd star |
| Three Enclosures (三垣) | 天市垣 | Tiān Shì Yuán | Heavenly Market enclosure | 天市右垣 | Tiānshìyòuyuán | Right Wall | κ Her A | Marsic (for component A) | 晉 | Jìn | (Star of) Jin |
| Three Enclosures (三垣) | 天市垣 | Tiān Shì Yuán | Heavenly Market enclosure | 天市右垣 | Tiānshìyòuyuán | Right Wall | 16 Her | | 河間增一 | Hejianzēngyī | 1st additional star of Hejian |
| Three Enclosures (三垣) | 天市垣 | Tiān Shì Yuán | Heavenly Market enclosure | 天市右垣 | Tiānshìyòuyuán | Right Wall | 5 Her | | 晉增一 | Jìnzēngyī | 1st additional star of Jin |
| Three Enclosures (三垣) | 天市垣 | Tiān Shì Yuán | Heavenly Market enclosure | 天市右垣 | Tiānshìyòuyuán | Right Wall | 8 Her | | 晉增二 | Jìnzēngèr | 2nd additional star of Jin |
| Three Enclosures (三垣) | 天市垣 | Tiān Shì Yuán | Heavenly Market enclosure | 天市右垣 | Tiānshìyòuyuán | Right Wall | q Her | | 晉增三 | Jìnzēngsān | 3rd additional star of Jin |
| Three Enclosures (三垣) | 天市垣 | Tiān Shì Yuán | Heavenly Market enclosure | 天市右垣 | Tiānshìyòuyuán | Right Wall | κ Her B | | 晉增五 | Jìnzēngwǔ | 5th additional star Jin |
| Three Enclosures (三垣) | 天市垣 | Tiān Shì Yuán | Heavenly Market enclosure | 宗 | Zōng | Patriarchal Clan | | | | | |
| Three Enclosures (三垣) | 天市垣 | Tiān Shì Yuán | Heavenly Market enclosure | 宗 | Zōng | Patriarchal Clan | 110 Her | | 宗一 | Zōngyī | 1st star |
| Three Enclosures (三垣) | 天市垣 | Tiān Shì Yuán | Heavenly Market enclosure | 宗 | Zōng | Patriarchal Clan | 111 Her | | 宗二 | Zōngèr | 2nd star |
| Three Enclosures (三垣) | 天市垣 | Tiān Shì Yuán | Heavenly Market enclosure | 帛度 | Bódù | Textile Ruler | | | | | |
| Three Enclosures (三垣) | 天市垣 | Tiān Shì Yuán | Heavenly Market enclosure | 帛度 | Bódù | Textile Ruler | 95 Her | Bodu | 帛度一 | Bódùyī | 1st star |
| Three Enclosures (三垣) | 天市垣 | Tiān Shì Yuán | Heavenly Market enclosure | 帛度 | Bódù | Textile Ruler | 102 Her | Ramus | 帛度二 | Bódùèr | 2nd star |
| Three Enclosures (三垣) | 天市垣 | Tiān Shì Yuán | Heavenly Market enclosure | 帛度 | Bódù | Textile Ruler | 96 Her | | 帛度增一 | Bódùzēngyī | 1st additional star |
| Three Enclosures (三垣) | 天市垣 | Tiān Shì Yuán | Heavenly Market enclosure | 帛度 | Bódù | Textile Ruler | 101 Her | | 帛度增二 | Bódùzēngèr | 2nd additional star |
| Three Enclosures (三垣) | 天市垣 | Tiān Shì Yuán | Heavenly Market enclosure | 帛度 | Bódù | Textile Ruler | 93 Her | | 帛度增三 | Bódùzēngsān | 3rd additional star |
| Three Enclosures (三垣) | 天市垣 | Tiān Shì Yuán | Heavenly Market enclosure | 屠肆 | Túsì | Butcher’s Shops | | | | | |
| Three Enclosures (三垣) | 天市垣 | Tiān Shì Yuán | Heavenly Market enclosure | 屠肆 | Túsì | Butcher’s Shops | 109 Her | Tusizuo | 屠肆一 | Túsìyī | 1st star |
| Three Enclosures (三垣) | 天市垣 | Tiān Shì Yuán | Heavenly Market enclosure | 屠肆 | Túsì | Butcher’s Shops | 98 Her | | 屠肆二 | Túsìèr | 2nd star |
| Three Enclosures (三垣) | 天市垣 | Tiān Shì Yuán | Heavenly Market enclosure | 屠肆 | Túsì | Butcher’s Shops | 97 Her | | 屠肆增一 | Túsìzēngyī | 1st additional star |
| Three Enclosures (三垣) | 天市垣 | Tiān Shì Yuán | Heavenly Market enclosure | 屠肆 | Túsì | Butcher’s Shops | 105 Her | | 屠肆增二 | Túsìzēngèr | 2nd additional star |
| Three Enclosures (三垣) | 天市垣 | Tiān Shì Yuán | Heavenly Market enclosure | 屠肆 | Túsì | Butcher’s Shops | 106 Her | | 屠肆增三 | Túsìzēngsān | 3rd additional star |
| Three Enclosures (三垣) | 天市垣 | Tiān Shì Yuán | Heavenly Market enclosure | 帝座 | Dìzuò | Emperor's Seat | α^{1} Her | Rasalgethi | 帝座 | Dìzuò | (One star of) |
| Three Enclosures (三垣) | 天市垣 | Tiān Shì Yuán | Heavenly Market enclosure | 宦者 | Huànzhě | Eunuch Official | | | | | |
| Three Enclosures (三垣) | 天市垣 | Tiān Shì Yuán | Heavenly Market enclosure | 宦者 | Huànzhě | Eunuch Official | 32 Oph | | 宦者一 | Huànzhěyī | 1st star |
| Three Enclosures (三垣) | 天市垣 | Tiān Shì Yuán | Heavenly Market enclosure | 宦者 | Huànzhě | Eunuch Official | HD 154228 | | 宦者二 | Huànzhěèr | 2nd star |
| Three Enclosures (三垣) | 天市垣 | Tiān Shì Yuán | Heavenly Market enclosure | 宦者 | Huànzhě | Eunuch Official | 60 Her | | 宦者三 | Huànzhěsān | 3rd star |
| Three Enclosures (三垣) | 天市垣 | Tiān Shì Yuán | Heavenly Market enclosure | 宦者 | Huànzhě | Eunuch Official | 54 Her | | 宦者增一 | Huànzhězēngyī | 1st additional star |
| Three Enclosures (三垣) | 天市垣 | Tiān Shì Yuán | Heavenly Market enclosure | 宦者 | Huànzhě | Eunuch Official | 49 Her | | 宦者增三 | Huànzhězēngsān | 3rd additional star |
| Three Enclosures (三垣) | 天市垣 | Tiān Shì Yuán | Heavenly Market enclosure | 宦者 | Huànzhě | Eunuch Official | HD 154278 | | 宦者增四 | Huànzhězēngsì | 4th additional star |
| Three Enclosures (三垣) | 天市垣 | Tiān Shì Yuán | Heavenly Market enclosure | 斗 | Dǒu | Dipper for Liquid | | | | | |
| Three Enclosures (三垣) | 天市垣 | Tiān Shì Yuán | Heavenly Market enclosure | 斗 | Dǒu | Dipper for Liquid | ω Her | | 斗一 | Dǒuyī | 1st star |
| Three Enclosures (三垣) | 天市垣 | Tiān Shì Yuán | Heavenly Market enclosure | 斗 | Dǒu | Dipper for Liquid | 49 Ser | | 斗二 | Dǒuèr | 2nd star |
| Three Enclosures (三垣) | 天市垣 | Tiān Shì Yuán | Heavenly Market enclosure | 斗 | Dǒu | Dipper for Liquid | 13 Her | | 斗三 | Dǒusān | 3rd star |
| Three Enclosures (三垣) | 天市垣 | Tiān Shì Yuán | Heavenly Market enclosure | 斗 | Dǒu | Dipper for Liquid | 29 Her | | 斗四 | Dǒusì | 4th star |
| Three Enclosures (三垣) | 天市垣 | Tiān Shì Yuán | Heavenly Market enclosure | 斗 | Dǒu | Dipper for Liquid | 33 Her | | 斗五 | Dǒuwu | 5th star |
| Three Enclosures (三垣) | 天市垣 | Tiān Shì Yuán | Heavenly Market enclosure | 斗 | Dǒu | Dipper for Liquid | 15 Her | | 斗增二 | Dǒuzēngèr | 2nd additional star |
| Three Enclosures (三垣) | 天市垣 | Tiān Shì Yuán | Heavenly Market enclosure | 斗 | Dǒu | Dipper for Liquid | 12 Her | | 斗增六 | Dǒuzēngliù | 6th additional star |
| Three Enclosures (三垣) | 天市垣 | Tiān Shì Yuán | Heavenly Market enclosure | 斗 | Dǒu | Dipper for Liquid | 9 Her | | 斗增七 | Dǒuzēngqī | 7th additional star |
| Three Enclosures (三垣) | 天市垣 | Tiān Shì Yuán | Heavenly Market enclosure | 斗 | Dǒu | Dipper for Liquid | 21 Her | | 斗增九 | Dǒuzēngjiǔ | 9th additional star |
| Three Enclosures (三垣) | 天市垣 | Tiān Shì Yuán | Heavenly Market enclosure | 斗 | Dǒu | Dipper for Liquid | 28 Her | | 斗增十 | Dǒuzēngshí | 10th additional star |
| Three Enclosures (三垣) | 天市垣 | Tiān Shì Yuán | Heavenly Market enclosure | 斛 | Hú | Dipper for Solid | | | | | |
| Three Enclosures (三垣) | 天市垣 | Tiān Shì Yuán | Heavenly Market enclosure | 斛 | Hú | Dipper for Solid | 47 Her | | 斛三 | Húsān | 3rd star |
| Three Enclosures (三垣) | 天市垣 | Tiān Shì Yuán | Heavenly Market enclosure | 斛 | Hú | Dipper for Solid | 43 Her | | 斛四 | Húsì | 4th star |
| Three Enclosures (三垣) | 天市垣 | Tiān Shì Yuán | Heavenly Market enclosure | 斛 | Hú | Dipper for Solid | 41 Her | | 斛增二 | Húzēngèr | 2nd additional star |
| Three Enclosures (三垣) | 天市垣 | Tiān Shì Yuán | Heavenly Market enclosure | 斛 | Hú | Dipper for Solid | 45 Her | | 斛增三 | Húzēngsān | 3rd additional star |
| Three Enclosures (三垣) | 天市垣 | Tiān Shì Yuán | Heavenly Market enclosure | 斛 | Hú | Dipper for Solid | 38 Her | | 斛增四 | Húzēngsì | 4th additional star |
| Three Enclosures (三垣) | 天市垣 | Tiān Shì Yuán | Heavenly Market enclosure | 斛 | Hú | Dipper for Solid | 36 Her | | 斛增五 | Húzēngwǔ | 5th additional star |
| Three Enclosures (三垣) | 天市垣 | Tiān Shì Yuán | Heavenly Market enclosure | 斛 | Hú | Dipper for Solid | 37 Her | | 斛增六 | Húzēngliù | 6th additional star |
| Three Enclosures (三垣) | 天市垣 | Tiān Shì Yuán | Heavenly Market enclosure | 七公 | Qīgōng | Seven Excellencies | | | | | |
| Three Enclosures (三垣) | 天市垣 | Tiān Shì Yuán | Heavenly Market enclosure | 七公 | Qīgōng | Seven Excellencies | 42 Her | | 七公一 | Qīgōngyī | 1st star |
| Three Enclosures (三垣) | 天市垣 | Tiān Shì Yuán | Heavenly Market enclosure | 七公 | Qīgōng | Seven Excellencies | τ Her | | 七公二 | Qīgōngèr | 2nd star |
| Three Enclosures (三垣) | 天市垣 | Tiān Shì Yuán | Heavenly Market enclosure | 七公 | Qīgōng | Seven Excellencies | φ Her | | 七公三 | Qīgōngsān | 3rd star |
| Three Enclosures (三垣) | 天市垣 | Tiān Shì Yuán | Heavenly Market enclosure | 七公 | Qīgōng | Seven Excellencies | χ Her | | 七公四 | Qīgōngsì | 4th star |
| Three Enclosures (三垣) | 天市垣 | Tiān Shì Yuán | Heavenly Market enclosure | 七公 | Qīgōng | Seven Excellencies | 34 Her | | 七公增三 | Qīgōngzēngsān | 3rd additional star |
| Three Enclosures (三垣) | 天市垣 | Tiān Shì Yuán | Heavenly Market enclosure | 七公 | Qīgōng | Seven Excellencies | υ Her | | 七公四 | Qīgōngzēngsì | 4th additional star |
| Three Enclosures (三垣) | 天市垣 | Tiān Shì Yuán | Heavenly Market enclosure | 七公 | Qīgōng | Seven Excellencies | 4 Her | | 七公增十一 | Qīgōngzēngshíyī | 11th additional star |
| Three Enclosures (三垣) | 天市垣 | Tiān Shì Yuán | Heavenly Market enclosure | 七公 | Qīgōng | Seven Excellencies | 2 Her | | 七公增十二 | Qīgōngzēngshíèr | 12th additional star |
| Three Enclosures (三垣) | 天市垣 | Tiān Shì Yuán | Heavenly Market enclosure | 七公 | Qīgōng | Seven Excellencies | 14 Her | | 七公增十三 | Qīgōngzēngshísān | 13th additional star |
| Three Enclosures (三垣) | 天市垣 | Tiān Shì Yuán | Heavenly Market enclosure | 七公 | Qīgōng | Seven Excellencies | 30 Her | | 七公增十四 | Qīgōngzēngshísì | 14th additional star |
| Three Enclosures (三垣) | 天市垣 | Tiān Shì Yuán | Heavenly Market enclosure | 七公 | Qīgōng | Seven Excellencies | σ Her | | 七公增十五 | Qīgōngzēngshíwǔ | 15th additional star |
| Three Enclosures (三垣) | 天市垣 | Tiān Shì Yuán | Heavenly Market enclosure | 七公 | Qīgōng | Seven Excellencies | 52 Her | | 七公增十六 | Qīgōngzēngshíliù | 16th additional star |
| Three Enclosures (三垣) | 天市垣 | Tiān Shì Yuán | Heavenly Market enclosure | 貫索 | Guànsuǒ | Coiled Thong | | | | | |
| Three Enclosures (三垣) | 天市垣 | Tiān Shì Yuán | Heavenly Market enclosure | 貫索 | Guànsuǒ | Coiled Thong | 19 Her | | 貫索增九 | Guànsuǒzēngjiǔ | 9th additional star |
| Three Enclosures (三垣) | 天市垣 | Tiān Shì Yuán | Heavenly Market enclosure | 貫索 | Guànsuǒ | Coiled Thong | 17 Her | | 貫索增十 | Guànsuǒzēngshí | 10th additional star |
| Three Enclosures (三垣) | 天市垣 | Tiān Shì Yuán | Heavenly Market enclosure | 貫索 | Guànsuǒ | Coiled Thong | 10 Her | | 貫索增十一 | Guànsuǒzēngshíyī | 11th additional star |
| Three Enclosures (三垣) | 天市垣 | Tiān Shì Yuán | Heavenly Market enclosure | 天紀 | Tiānjì | Celestial Discipline | | | | | |
| Three Enclosures (三垣) | 天市垣 | Tiān Shì Yuán | Heavenly Market enclosure | 天紀 | Tiānjì | Celestial Discipline | ζ Her | Tianji | 天紀二 | Tiānjìèr | 2nd star |
| Three Enclosures (三垣) | 天市垣 | Tiān Shì Yuán | Heavenly Market enclosure | 天紀 | Tiānjì | Celestial Discipline | ε Her | Khepdenreret | 天紀三 | Tiānjìsān | 3rd star |
| Three Enclosures (三垣) | 天市垣 | Tiān Shì Yuán | Heavenly Market enclosure | 天紀 | Tiānjì | Celestial Discipline | 59 Her | | 天紀四 | Tiānjìsì | 4th star |
| Three Enclosures (三垣) | 天市垣 | Tiān Shì Yuán | Heavenly Market enclosure | 天紀 | Tiānjì | Celestial Discipline | 61 Her | | 天紀五 | Tiānjìwǔ | 5th star |
| Three Enclosures (三垣) | 天市垣 | Tiān Shì Yuán | Heavenly Market enclosure | 天紀 | Tiānjì | Celestial Discipline | 68 Her | | 天紀六 | Tiānjìliù | 6th star |
| Three Enclosures (三垣) | 天市垣 | Tiān Shì Yuán | Heavenly Market enclosure | 天紀 | Tiānjì | Celestial Discipline | HD 160054 | | 天紀七 | Tiānjìqī | 7th star |
| Three Enclosures (三垣) | 天市垣 | Tiān Shì Yuán | Heavenly Market enclosure | 天紀 | Tiānjì | Celestial Discipline | θ Her | | 天紀九 | Tiānjìjiǔ | 9th star |
| Three Enclosures (三垣) | 天市垣 | Tiān Shì Yuán | Heavenly Market enclosure | 天紀 | Tiānjì | Celestial Discipline | η Her | | 天紀增一 | Tiānjìzēngyī | 1st additional star |
| Three Enclosures (三垣) | 天市垣 | Tiān Shì Yuán | Heavenly Market enclosure | 天紀 | Tiānjì | Celestial Discipline | 25 Her | | 天紀增二 | Tiānjìzēngèr | 2nd additional star |
| Three Enclosures (三垣) | 天市垣 | Tiān Shì Yuán | Heavenly Market enclosure | 天紀 | Tiānjì | Celestial Discipline | 23 Her | | 天紀增四 | Tiānjìzēngsì | 4th additional star |
| Three Enclosures (三垣) | 天市垣 | Tiān Shì Yuán | Heavenly Market enclosure | 天紀 | Tiānjì | Celestial Discipline | 26 Her | | 天紀增五 | Tiānjìzēngwǔ | 5th additional star |
| Three Enclosures (三垣) | 天市垣 | Tiān Shì Yuán | Heavenly Market enclosure | 天紀 | Tiānjì | Celestial Discipline | 32 Her | | 天紀增六 | Tiānjìzēngliù | 6th additional star |
| Three Enclosures (三垣) | 天市垣 | Tiān Shì Yuán | Heavenly Market enclosure | 天紀 | Tiānjì | Celestial Discipline | 39 Her | | 天紀增七 | Tiānjìzēngqī | 7th additional star |
| Three Enclosures (三垣) | 天市垣 | Tiān Shì Yuán | Heavenly Market enclosure | 天紀 | Tiānjì | Celestial Discipline | 46 Her | | 天紀增八 | Tiānjìzēngbā | 8th additional star |
| Three Enclosures (三垣) | 天市垣 | Tiān Shì Yuán | Heavenly Market enclosure | 天紀 | Tiānjì | Celestial Discipline | 50 Her | | 天紀增九 | Tiānjìzēngjiǔ | 9th additional star |
| Three Enclosures (三垣) | 天市垣 | Tiān Shì Yuán | Heavenly Market enclosure | 天紀 | Tiānjì | Celestial Discipline | 48 Her | | 天紀增十 | Tiānjìzēngshí | 10th additional star |
| Three Enclosures (三垣) | 天市垣 | Tiān Shì Yuán | Heavenly Market enclosure | 天紀 | Tiānjì | Celestial Discipline | 53 Her | | 天紀增十一 | Tiānjìzēngshíyī | 11th additional star |
| Three Enclosures (三垣) | 天市垣 | Tiān Shì Yuán | Heavenly Market enclosure | 天紀 | Tiānjì | Celestial Discipline | 72 Her | | 天紀增十三 | Tiānjìzēngshísān | 13th additional star |
| Three Enclosures (三垣) | 天市垣 | Tiān Shì Yuán | Heavenly Market enclosure | 天紀 | Tiānjì | Celestial Discipline | 90 Her | | 天紀增十四 | Tiānjìzēngshísì | 14th additional star |
| Three Enclosures (三垣) | 天市垣 | Tiān Shì Yuán | Heavenly Market enclosure | 天紀 | Tiānjì | Celestial Discipline | HD 157910 | | 天紀增十五 | Tiānjìzēngshíwǔ | 15th additional star |
| Three Enclosures (三垣) | 天市垣 | Tiān Shì Yuán | Heavenly Market enclosure | 女床 | Nǚchuáng | Woman’s Bed | | | | | |
| Three Enclosures (三垣) | 天市垣 | Tiān Shì Yuán | Heavenly Market enclosure | 女床 | Nǚchuáng | Woman’s Bed | π Her | Nüchuang | 女床一 | Nǚchuángyī | 1st star |
| Three Enclosures (三垣) | 天市垣 | Tiān Shì Yuán | Heavenly Market enclosure | 女床 | Nǚchuáng | Woman’s Bed | 69 Her | | 女床二 | Nǚchuángèr | 2nd star |
| Three Enclosures (三垣) | 天市垣 | Tiān Shì Yuán | Heavenly Market enclosure | 女床 | Nǚchuáng | Woman’s Bed | ρ Her | | 女床三 | Nǚchuángsān | 3rd star |

== See also ==
- Traditional Chinese star names
- Chinese constellations
