= List of stars in Hercules =

This is the list of notable stars in the constellation Hercules, sorted by decreasing brightness.

Name	B	F	G.	Var	HD	HIP	RA	Dec	vis. mag.	abs. mag.	Dist. (ly)	Sp. class	Notes
β Her	β	27			148856	80816	16^{h} 30^{m} 13.26^{s}	+21° 29′ 22.7″	2.78	−0.50	148	G8III	Kornephoros, Korneforos, Rutilicus
ζ Her	ζ	40			150680	81693	16^{h} 41^{m} 17.48^{s}	+31° 36′ 06.8″	2.81	2.64	35	F9IV	Tianji
δ Her	δ	65			156164	84379	17^{h} 15^{m} 01.92^{s}	+24° 50′ 22.5″	3.12	1.21	78	A3IVv SB	Sarin, Menkib al Jathi al Aisr, Humerus Sinister Ingeniculi
π Her	π	67			156283	84380	17^{h} 15^{m} 02.85^{s}	+36° 48′ 33.0″	3.16	−2.10	367	K3IIvar	Nüchuang
α^{1} Her	α^{1}	64			156014	84345	17^{h} 14^{m} 38.86^{s}	+14° 23′ 24.9″	3.31	−2.04	382	M5IIvar	Ras Algethi, Rasalgethi, Rasalegti, Ras al Djathi, Caput Ingeniculi
μ Her	μ	86			161797	86974	17^{h} 46^{m} 27.72^{s}	+27° 43′ 21.0″	3.42	3.80	27	G5IV	Marfak Al Jathih Al Aisr, Cubitum Sinistrum Ingeniculi, Jiuhe (九河), Kew Ho
η Her	η	44			150997	81833	16^{h} 42^{m} 53.74^{s}	+38° 55′ 20.9″	3.48	0.80	112	G7.5IIIb	
ξ Her	ξ	92			163993	87933	17^{h} 57^{m} 45.83^{s}	+29° 14′ 52.5″	3.70	0.61	135	K0III	
γ Her	γ	20			147547	80170	16^{h} 21^{m} 55.24^{s}	+19° 09′ 10.9″	3.74	−0.15	195	A9III	Hejian (河間), Ho Keen
ι Her	ι	85			160762	86414	17^{h} 39^{m} 27.89^{s}	+46° 00′ 22.8″	3.82	−2.09	495	B3V SB	Tianbang, Fekhiz al Jathih al Aisr, Femur Sinistrum Ingeniculi, β Cep variable
ο Her	ο	103			166014	88794	18^{h} 07^{m} 32.55^{s}	+28° 45′ 44.9″	3.84	−1.30	347	B9.5V	Zhōngshān (中山); γ Cas variable
109 Her		109			169414	90139	18^{h} 23^{m} 41.77^{s}	+21° 46′ 13.2″	3.85	0.87	128	K2III	Tusizuo
θ Her	θ	91			163770	87808	17^{h} 56^{m} 15.18^{s}	+37° 15′ 01.9″	3.86	−2.70	669	K1IIvar	Rukbalgethi Genubi, Rekbet al Jathih al Aisr, Genu Sinistrum Ingeniculi
τ Her	τ	22			147394	79992	16^{h} 19^{m} 44.45^{s}	+46° 18′ 47.8″	3.91	−1.01	314	B5IV	Asuusiha
ε Her	ε	58			153808	83207	17^{h} 00^{m} 17.41^{s}	+30° 55′ 34.8″	3.92	0.43	163	A0V	Khepdenreret
110 Her		110			173667	92043	18^{h} 45^{m} 39.73^{s}	+20° 32′ 49.6″	4.19	2.79	62	F6V	
σ Her	σ	35			149630	81126	16^{h} 34^{m} 06.19^{s}	+42° 26′ 12.8″	4.20	−0.63	302	B9Vvar	
φ Her	φ	11			145389	79101	16^{h} 08^{m} 46.20^{s}	+44° 56′ 05.3″	4.23	0.00	228	B9MNp...	α^{2} CVn variable
95 Her		95			164668	88267	18^{h} 01^{m} 30.40^{s}	+21° 35′ 44.8″	4.26	−1.54	470	G5III	Bodu, Colour contrasted double star
111 Her		111			173880	92161	18^{h} 47^{m} 01.22^{s}	+18° 10′ 52.4″	4.34	2.07	93	A5III	
102 Her		102			166182	88886	18^{h} 08^{m} 45.49^{s}	+20° 48′ 52.5″	4.37	−3.98	1523	B2IV	Ramus
λ Her	λ	76			158899	85693	17^{h} 30^{m} 44.30^{s}	+26° 06′ 38.2″	4.41	−0.85	367	K3IIIvar	Maasym, Masym, Misam
ν Her	ν	94			164136	87998	17^{h} 58^{m} 30.15^{s}	+30° 11′ 21.4″	4.41	−2.53	795	F2II	
ρ Her A	ρ	75			157779	85112	17^{h} 23^{m} 40.97^{s}	+37° 08′ 45.3″	4.51		393	B9.5III	close binary
ω Her	ω	24			148112	80463	16^{h} 25^{m} 24.93^{s}	+14° 02′ 00.3″	4.57	0.28	235	B9p Cr	Cujam, Kajam, Cujam, Caiam; α^{2} CVn variable
113 Her		113			175492	92818	18^{h} 54^{m} 44.88^{s}	+22° 38′ 42.3″	4.57	−1.30	486	G4III+...	
χ Her	χ	1			142373	77760	15^{h} 52^{m} 40.19^{s}	+42° 27′ 00.0″	4.60	3.60	52	F9V	
69 Her	e	69			156729	84606	17^{h} 17^{m} 40.29^{s}	+37° 17′ 28.8″	4.64	0.96	178	A2V	
93 Her		93			164349	88128	18^{h} 00^{m} 03.42^{s}	+16° 45′ 03.4″	4.67	−1.85	656	K0II-III	
υ Her	υ	6			144206	78592	16^{h} 02^{m} 47.85^{s}	+46° 02′ 12.7″	4.72	−0.59	376	B9III	
68 Her	u	68			156633	84573	17^{h} 17^{m} 19.57^{s}	+33° 06′ 00.4″	4.80	−2.32	865	B1.5Vp	
52 Her		52		V637	152107	82321	16^{h} 49^{m} 14.20^{s}	+45° 59′ 00.4″	4.82	1.17	175	A2p...	V637 Her; α^{2} CVn variable
30 Her	g	30			148783	80704	16^{h} 28^{m} 38.52^{s}	+41° 52′ 54.1″	4.83	−0.39	361	M6III:var	
29 Her	h	29			149161	81008	16^{h} 32^{m} 36.40^{s}	+11° 29′ 17.6″	4.84	−0.10	317	K4III	
42 Her		42			150450	81497	16^{h} 38^{m} 44.89^{s}	+48° 55′ 41.8″	4.86	−0.45	376	M2.5III	
60 Her		60			154494	83613	17^{h} 05^{m} 22.66^{s}	+12° 44′ 27.1″	4.89	1.67	144	A4IV	
106 Her		106			168720	89861	18^{h} 20^{m} 17.90^{s}	+21° 57′ 41.2″	4.92	−0.66	426	M1III	
98 Her		98			165625	88657	18^{h} 06^{m} 01.91^{s}	+22° 13′ 08.0″	4.96	−1.42	615	M3IIIa+...	
104 Her	A	104		V669	167006	89172	18^{h} 11^{m} 54.17^{s}	+31° 24′ 19.0″	4.96	−1.37	601	M3III	
32 Oph		(32)			154143	83430	17^{h} 03^{m} 07.86^{s}	+14° 05′ 31.6″	4.97	−0.52	409	M3III	
κ Her	κ	7			145001	79043	16^{h} 08^{m} 04.55^{s}	+17° 02′ 49.2″	5.00	−0.38	388	G8III	Marfik, Marfak, Mirfak, Marsik, Maasim
					166208	88788	18^{h} 07^{m} 28.74^{s}	+43° 27′ 43.3″	5.00	−0.23	363	G8III...	
V656 Her					157049	84833	17^{h} 20^{m} 18.87^{s}	+18° 03′ 26.0″	5.01	−0.80	472	M2III	
51 Her		51			152326	82504	16^{h} 51^{m} 45.26^{s}	+24° 39′ 23.1″	5.03	−1.80	758	K2II-III	
99 Her	b	99			165908	88745	18^{h} 07^{m} 01.61^{s}	+30° 33′ 42.7″	5.05	4.08	51	F7V	
HD 155410					155410	83947	17^{h} 09^{m} 33.28^{s}	+40° 46′ 37.3″	5.07	0.42	278	K3III	
87 Her		87			162211	87194	17^{h} 48^{m} 49.15^{s}	+25° 37′ 22.7″	5.09	1.10	205	K2III	
5 Her	r	5			143666	78481	16^{h} 01^{m} 14.35^{s}	+17° 49′ 04.9″	5.10	0.22	308	G8III	
101 Her		101			166230	88899	18^{h} 08^{m} 52.86^{s}	+20° 02′ 43.0″	5.10	0.13	321	A8III	
107 Her	t	107			168914	89935	18^{h} 21^{m} 01.02^{s}	+28° 52′ 11.4″	5.12	0.48	277	A7V	
70 Her		70			157198	84887	17^{h} 20^{m} 54.22^{s}	+24° 29′ 58.0″	5.13	−0.63	462	A2V	
43 Her	i	43	15		151217	82073	16^{h} 45^{m} 49.89^{s}	+08° 34′ 57.3″	5.15	−0.01	351	K5III	17 Ophiuchi
90 Her	f	90			163217	87563	17^{h} 53^{m} 18.02^{s}	+40° 00′ 28.2″	5.17	−0.07	363	K3III	
45 Her	l	45	16	V776	151525	82216	16^{h} 47^{m} 46.43^{s}	+05° 14′ 48.6″	5.22	−0.53	460	B9p (Cr)	V776 Her; α^{2} CVn variable
HD 148897	s				148897	80843	16^{h} 30^{m} 33.60^{s}	+20° 28′ 45.6″	5.24	−1.59	758	G8p	
96 Her		96		V820	164852	88331	18^{h} 02^{m} 23.05^{s}	+20° 50′ 01.1″	5.25	−2.24	1028	B3IV	V820 Her; spectroscopic binary
HD 169191					169191	90067	18^{h} 22^{m} 49.00^{s}	+17° 49′ 35.7″	5.25	−0.38	436	K3III	spectroscopic binary
59 Her	d	59			154029	83313	17^{h} 01^{m} 36.36^{s}	+33° 34′ 05.8″	5.27	0.49	295	A3IV	
105 Her		105			168532	89773	18^{h} 19^{m} 10.67^{s}	+24° 26′ 45.8″	5.30	−2.67	1278	K4II SB	
53 Her		53			152598	82587	16^{h} 52^{m} 58.12^{s}	+31° 42′ 06.2″	5.34	2.95	98	F0V	
2 Her		2			142780	77907	15^{h} 54^{m} 37.88^{s}	+43° 08′ 18.3″	5.35	−1.07	626	M3III	
54 Her		54			152879	82802	16^{h} 55^{m} 22.24^{s}	+18° 25′ 59.5″	5.35	0.17	355	K4III	
82 Her	y	82			160290	86182	17^{h} 36^{m} 37.63^{s}	+48° 35′ 07.7″	5.35	0.33	329	K1III	
HD 157087					157087	84821	17^{h} 20^{m} 09.83^{s}	+25° 32′ 15.5″	5.36	−0.58	502	A3III	
72 Her	w	72			157214	84862	17^{h} 20^{m} 39.47^{s}	+32° 28′ 13.0″	5.38	4.59	47	G0V	
HD 152815					152815	82764	16^{h} 54^{m} 55.14^{s}	+20° 57′ 30.5″	5.39	0.93	255	G8III	
α^{2} Her	α^{2}	64			156015		17^{h} 14^{m} 39.20^{s}	+14° 23′ 24.0″	5.39				
ρ Her B	ρ	75			157778	85112	17^{h} 23^{m} 41.00^{s}	+37° 08′ 45.0″	5.40		393	A0Vn	binary companion with ρ Her A
HD 155103	c				155103	83838	17^{h} 08^{m} 02.08^{s}	+35° 56′ 06.8″	5.41	1.75	176	A5m	
HD 169110					169110	90023	18^{h} 22^{m} 08.69^{s}	+23° 17′ 06.0″	5.41	−1.17	676	K5III	
112 Her		112			174933	92614	18^{h} 52^{m} 16.43^{s}	+21° 25′ 30.6″	5.43	−0.31	459	B9p...	
9 Her		9	1		145892	79488	16^{h} 13^{m} 15.41^{s}	+05° 01′ 16.0″	5.46	−0.11	424	K5III	
89 Her		89		V441	163506	87747	17^{h} 55^{m} 25.19^{s}	+26° 02′ 59.9″	5.47	−4.49	3196	F2Iavar	V441 Her
HD 147365					147365	80008	16^{h} 19^{m} 55.24^{s}	+39° 42′ 30.9″	5.48	3.34	87	F3IV-V	
47 Her	k	47	17		151956	82402	16^{h} 50^{m} 19.35^{s}	+07° 14′ 51.7″	5.48	1.67	188	A3m	
HD 166229					166229	88836	18^{h} 08^{m} 02.31^{s}	+36° 24′ 06.2″	5.49	1.46	208	K2III	
74 Her		74			157325	84835	17^{h} 20^{m} 21.15^{s}	+46° 14′ 26.4″	5.51	−0.73	576	M0III	
HD 162555					162555	87308	17^{h} 50^{m} 22.87^{s}	+29° 19′ 19.3″	5.51	0.95	267	K1III	
HD 158148					158148	85385	17^{h} 26^{m} 49.13^{s}	+20° 04′ 51.4″	5.52	−0.27	470	B5V	
25 Her		25			148283	80460	16^{h} 25^{m} 24.17^{s}	+37° 23′ 38.7″	5.53	1.05	256	A5V	
HR 6594					160910	86623	17^{h} 41^{m} 58.63^{s}	+15° 57′ 08.7″	5.55	2.74	114	F4Vw	Wide binary
V819 Her				V819	157482	84949	17^{h} 21^{m} 43.61^{s}	+39° 58′ 29.3″	5.55	1.51	210	F9Vn...	Algol variable
					154733	83692	17^{h} 06^{m} 18.11^{s}	+22° 05′ 03.3″	5.56	0.36	358	K4III	
83 Her		83			161074	86667	17^{h} 42^{m} 28.40^{s}	+24° 33′ 51.5″	5.56	0.31	365	K4III	
					166640	89008	18^{h} 09^{m} 58.99^{s}	+36° 27′ 58.5″	5.57	−0.05	434	G8III	
					151203	82028	16^{h} 45^{m} 22.51^{s}	+15° 44′ 43.5″	5.60	−0.40	517	M3III	
					149303	80953	16^{h} 31^{m} 47.23^{s}	+45° 35′ 53.5″	5.61	1.41	225	A4Vn	
					161833	87044	17^{h} 47^{m} 08.04^{s}	+17° 41′ 49.3″	5.61	0.35	368	A1V	
108 Her		108			168913	89925	18^{h} 20^{m} 56.97^{s}	+29° 51′ 31.7″	5.61	1.81	188	A5m	
					163547	87777	17^{h} 55^{m} 50.81^{s}	+22° 27′ 51.2″	5.62	−0.26	489	K3III	
					171745	91139	18^{h} 35^{m} 30.39^{s}	+23° 36′ 19.9″	5.62	−0.25	487	G8III	
n Her	n	28	9		149121	81007	16^{h} 32^{m} 35.68^{s}	+05° 31′ 16.4″	5.63	0.66	322	B9.5III	11 Ophiuchi
					158974	85715	17^{h} 30^{m} 55.37^{s}	+31° 09′ 29.2″	5.63	0.32	377	G8III	
					159332	85912	17^{h} 33^{m} 22.84^{s}	+19° 15′ 24.8″	5.65	2.83	120	F6V	
78 Her		78			159139	85790	17^{h} 31^{m} 49.57^{s}	+28° 24′ 26.8″	5.66	1.03	275	A1V	
					156874	84691	17^{h} 18^{m} 48.50^{s}	+28° 49′ 22.7″	5.68	0.73	318	K0III	
					159353	85930	17^{h} 33^{m} 39.39^{s}	+16° 19′ 03.7″	5.68	0.72	320	K0III:	
					153834	83254	17^{h} 00^{m} 58.14^{s}	+22° 37′ 55.7″	5.69	−4.16	3047	K3III	
					162076	87158	17^{h} 48^{m} 24.75^{s}	+20° 33′ 55.5″	5.69	1.27	250	G5IV	
					164646	88122	17^{h} 59^{m} 56.20^{s}	+45° 30′ 05.3″	5.69	−0.67	610	M0III	
					175743	92937	18^{h} 56^{m} 06.15^{s}	+18° 06′ 20.9″	5.69	1.06	275	K1III	
73 Her		73			157728	85157	17^{h} 24^{m} 06.61^{s}	+22° 57′ 37.3″	5.70	2.54	139	F0IV	
16 Her		16			146388	79666	16^{h} 15^{m} 28.68^{s}	+18° 48′ 29.9″	5.72	0.79	316	K3III	
					159501	85888	17^{h} 33^{m} 07.31^{s}	+41° 14′ 37.0″	5.72	0.40	378	K1III:	
					165683	88636	18^{h} 05^{m} 49.60^{s}	+32° 13′ 50.6″	5.72	−0.92	695	K0III	
4 Her		4		V839	142926	77986	15^{h} 55^{m} 30.61^{s}	+42° 33′ 58.1″	5.73	−0.12	482	B9p	V839 Her; Be star
50 Her		50			152173	82422	16^{h} 50^{m} 38.96^{s}	+29° 48′ 23.6″	5.73	−1.53	924	M1III	
84 Her		84			161239	86731	17^{h} 43^{m} 21.64^{s}	+24° 19′ 39.5″	5.73	2.82	125	G2IIIb	
10 Her		10		LQ	145713	79349	16^{h} 11^{m} 38.05^{s}	+23° 29′ 41.4″	5.74	−0.46	566	M4IIIa	LQ Her
					157740	85185	17^{h} 24^{m} 31.53^{s}	+16° 18′ 03.9″	5.75	0.14	432	A3V	
					149009	80898	16^{h} 31^{m} 13.44^{s}	+22° 11′ 43.6″	5.76	−1.51	926	K5III	
					154084	83367	17^{h} 02^{m} 18.66^{s}	+25° 30′ 19.4″	5.76	0.49	369	G7III:	
79 Her		79			160181	86254	17^{h} 37^{m} 31.10^{s}	+24° 18′ 35.9″	5.76	1.43	240	A2Vn	
					170878	90762	18^{h} 31^{m} 04.47^{s}	+16° 55′ 43.0″	5.76	0.24	414	A2V	
37 Her	m	37	12		150378	81641	16^{h} 40^{m} 38.69^{s}	+04° 13′ 11.3″	5.77	0.93	303	A1V	
100 Her		100			166046	88817	18^{h} 07^{m} 49.51^{s}	+26° 05′ 50.2″	5.79	2.26	166	A3V	
					171623	91118	18^{h} 35^{m} 12.59^{s}	+18° 12′ 12.2″	5.79	−0.79	676	A0Vn	
					169981	90342	18^{h} 25^{m} 58.77^{s}	+29° 49′ 44.4″	5.81	0.22	427	A2IV	
21 Her	o	21	4		147869	80351	16^{h} 24^{m} 10.83^{s}	+06° 56′ 53.4″	5.83	0.73	341	A2sp...	
					150030	81289	16^{h} 36^{m} 11.21^{s}	+46° 36′ 48.0″	5.83	−1.32	879	G8II	
77 Her	x	77			158414	85379	17^{h} 26^{m} 44.24^{s}	+48° 15′ 36.3″	5.83	0.60	363	A4V	
100 Her		100			166045	88818	18^{h} 07^{m} 49.56^{s}	+26° 06′ 04.4″	5.83	1.60	228	A3V	
V636 Her					151732	82172	16^{h} 47^{m} 19.74^{s}	+42° 14′ 20.3″	5.86	−0.93	743	M4IIIa	
					170650	90637	18^{h} 29^{m} 35.71^{s}	+23° 51′ 58.3″	5.87	−2.41	1475	B6IV	
					171245	90915	18^{h} 32^{m} 46.15^{s}	+23° 37′ 00.4″	5.88	−1.05	793	K5III	
					145931	79357	16^{h} 11^{m} 47.60^{s}	+42° 22′ 28.2″	5.89	−1.40	934	K4II+...	
					174262	92312	18^{h} 48^{m} 53.38^{s}	+19° 19′ 43.6″	5.89	1.22	280	A1V	
					151862	82350	16^{h} 49^{m} 34.67^{s}	+13° 15′ 40.3″	5.91	1.18	287	A1V	
33 Oph		(33)			154228	83478	17^{h} 03^{m} 39.31^{s}	+13° 36′ 19.5″	5.91	1.37	263	A1V	
39 Her		39			150682	81729	16^{h} 41^{m} 36.70^{s}	+26° 55′ 01.2″	5.92	2.76	140	F2III	
					147352	79953	16^{h} 19^{m} 11.23^{s}	+49° 02′ 17.1″	5.93	−0.53	638	K6III	
					158261	85382	17^{h} 26^{m} 46.17^{s}	+34° 41′ 44.5″	5.94	1.27	280	A0V	
					156891	84656	17^{h} 18^{m} 23.28^{s}	+38° 48′ 40.4″	5.97	1.01	320	G7III:	
HD 166988					166988	89156	18^{h} 11^{m} 45.11^{s}	+33° 26′ 49.3″	5.98	−0.87	763	A3V	
					152812	82611	16^{h} 53^{m} 17.59^{s}	+47° 24′ 59.4″	5.99	−0.37	610	K2III	
					156284	84431	17^{h} 15^{m} 41.50^{s}	+23° 44′ 33.7″	5.99	−0.81	746	K2III	
					156653	84631	17^{h} 18^{m} 04.93^{s}	+17° 19′ 04.5″	6.00	0.55	401	A1V	
					162989	87445	17^{h} 52^{m} 04.73^{s}	+39° 58′ 55.1″	6.01	−0.64	698	K4III	
					164614	88190	18^{h} 00^{m} 36.38^{s}	+33° 12′ 49.5″	6.01	−0.79	746	K6III	
					168694	89827	18^{h} 19^{m} 52.07^{s}	+29° 39′ 59.0″	6.01	−0.50	655	K4III	
					151087	81911	16^{h} 43^{m} 51.74^{s}	+34° 02′ 19.2″	6.02	2.32	179	F2.5III-IV	
					164280	88020	17^{h} 58^{m} 42.32^{s}	+36° 17′ 16.5″	6.03	0.90	346	G5III:	
					143584	78286	15^{h} 59^{m} 04.38^{s}	+49° 52′ 52.2″	6.04	2.59	160	F0IV	
					147266	80021	16^{h} 20^{m} 04.29^{s}	+21° 07′ 57.9″	6.04	0.92	345	G8II	
					160054	86178	17^{h} 36^{m} 36.73^{s}	+30° 47′ 06.7″	6.04	1.93	216	A5V	
					167370	89279	18^{h} 13^{m} 04.82^{s}	+38° 46′ 24.5″	6.04	−0.44	644	B9IIIn	
					160677	86462	17^{h} 39^{m} 57.52^{s}	+31° 12′ 08.8″	6.05	−0.02	533	M2III	
56 Her		56			152863	82780	16^{h} 55^{m} 02.15^{s}	+25° 43′ 50.6″	6.06	0.33	457	G5III	
34 Oph		(34)			154278	83504	17^{h} 03^{m} 58.03^{s}	+13° 34′ 03.9″	6.06	0.98	337	K1III	
					150580	81670	16^{h} 41^{m} 00.60^{s}	+24° 51′ 31.3″	6.07	0.37	449	K2	
					151388	82012	16^{h} 45^{m} 11.80^{s}	+43° 13′ 02.3″	6.07	−0.39	638	K4III	
					150483	81659	16^{h} 40^{m} 51.36^{s}	+12° 23′ 42.2″	6.08	0.94	348	A3Vn	
					154431	83494	17^{h} 03^{m} 53.62^{s}	+34° 47′ 24.9″	6.08	2.42	176	A5V	
48 Ser	q	(48)			145647	79332	16^{h} 11^{m} 28.74^{s}	+16° 39′ 56.4″	6.09	0.44	440	A0V	
V640 Her					157967	85302	17^{h} 25^{m} 54.37^{s}	+16° 55′ 03.1″	6.09	−0.42	652	M4III	
					166479	89023	18^{h} 10^{m} 08.73^{s}	+16° 28′ 35.8″	6.09	−2.23	1502	B9V+...	
					148228	80514	16^{h} 26^{m} 11.41^{s}	+11° 24′ 26.9″	6.11	0.91	358	G8III	
					154732	83575	17^{h} 04^{m} 49.75^{s}	+48° 48′ 14.9″	6.11	1.08	330	K1III	
					159834	86118	17^{h} 35^{m} 59.56^{s}	+20° 59′ 46.6″	6.11	0.76	384	A7IV	
					155860	84108	17^{h} 11^{m} 40.26^{s}	+49° 44′ 46.7″	6.12	1.19	316	A5III	
8 Her		8			145122	79102	16^{h} 08^{m} 46.64^{s}	+17° 12′ 20.6″	6.13	0.87	367	A0Vnn	
					159925	86096	17^{h} 35^{m} 42.36^{s}	+37° 18′ 05.7″	6.13	0.55	425	G9III	
					162161	87192	17^{h} 48^{m} 47.88^{s}	+19° 15′ 18.0″	6.13	−0.24	612	A1V	
					162570	87341	17^{h} 50^{m} 48.37^{s}	+22° 18′ 59.0″	6.14	1.19	318	A9V	
					167193	89298	18^{h} 13^{m} 16.53^{s}	+21° 52′ 48.8″	6.14	−4.86	5175	K4III	
					152224	82426	16^{h} 50^{m} 43.13^{s}	+32° 33′ 12.8″	6.16	1.24	315	K0III	
					152153	82355	16^{h} 49^{m} 40.57^{s}	+43° 25′ 49.7″	6.18	−0.17	606	K0IV	
V624 Her				V624	161321	86809	17^{h} 44^{m} 17.25^{s}	+14° 24′ 36.1″	6.18	0.38	470	A3m	Algol variable
					164824	88277	18^{h} 01^{m} 35.89^{s}	+33° 18′ 40.4″	6.18	−1.18	967	K5III	
					165524	88604	18^{h} 05^{m} 30.13^{s}	+21° 38′ 47.8″	6.18	0.67	413	K3III:	
					173833	92131	18^{h} 46^{m} 41.35^{s}	+18° 42′ 21.5″	6.18	0.10	535	K5	
61 Her		61		V931	154356	83462	17^{h} 03^{m} 30.19^{s}	+35° 24′ 51.0″	6.19	−0.45	694	M4III	V931 Her
					154441	83565	17^{h} 04^{m} 41.34^{s}	+19° 35′ 56.8″	6.19	−0.14	600	B9.5V	
					174160	92270	18^{h} 48^{m} 16.39^{s}	+23° 30′ 53.2″	6.19	3.90	94	F8V	
V822 Her				V822	174853	92593	18^{h} 52^{m} 01.93^{s}	+13° 57′ 56.4″	6.19	−0.76	799	B8Vnn	β Lyr variable
63 Her		63		V620	155514	84054	17^{h} 11^{m} 03.17^{s}	+24° 14′ 15.4″	6.20	1.49	286	A8V	V620 Her; δ Sct variable
					171746	91159	18^{h} 35^{m} 53.19^{s}	+16° 58′ 33.1″	6.21	3.54	112	G2Vv comp	
					161149	86732	17^{h} 43^{m} 22.02^{s}	+14° 17′ 42.4″	6.22	0.94	371	F5II	
					161695	86925	17^{h} 45^{m} 40.23^{s}	+31° 30′ 16.9″	6.22	−4.26	4075	A0Ib	
OP Her				OP	163990	87850	17^{h} 56^{m} 48.51^{s}	+45° 21′ 03.3″	6.22	−1.21	1000	M6Sv	
97 Her		97			164900	88346	18^{h} 02^{m} 30.16^{s}	+22° 55′ 23.7″	6.22	−0.36	675	B3Vn	
					169223	90086	18^{h} 23^{m} 02.94^{s}	+16° 41′ 16.9″	6.22	0.31	495	K0	
					168270	89684	18^{h} 18^{m} 07.72^{s}	+18° 07′ 54.1″	6.24	−0.56	746	B9V	
κ Her	κ	7			145000	79045	16^{h} 08^{m} 04.97^{s}	+17° 03′ 16.0″	6.25	0.45	471	K1III	
					149084	80888	16^{h} 31^{m} 02.79^{s}	+35° 13′ 30.4″	6.25	−1.18	1000	K5	
					156593	84599	17^{h} 17^{m} 35.86^{s}	+23° 05′ 26.3″	6.25	−2.44	1781	K2	
					157910	85181	17^{h} 24^{m} 27.13^{s}	+36° 57′ 06.6″	6.25	−0.36	683	G5III+...	
					165358	88415	18^{h} 03^{m} 08.87^{s}	+48° 27′ 51.3″	6.26	0.22	526	A2V	
57 Her		57			153287	82987	16^{h} 57^{m} 31.04^{s}	+25° 21′ 10.1″	6.27	0.11	555	G5III:	
V451 Her				V451	153882	83308	17^{h} 01^{m} 33.05^{s}	+14° 56′ 59.0″	6.27	0.13	551	B9p CrEu	α^{2} CVn variable
					169718	90256	18^{h} 24^{m} 58.46^{s}	+27° 23′ 41.3″	6.27	0.89	388	A2Vn	
					164507	88217	18^{h} 00^{m} 57.30^{s}	+15° 05′ 37.7″	6.28	3.01	147	G5IV	
					152262	82419	16^{h} 50^{m} 36.15^{s}	+41° 53′ 46.8″	6.29	0.82	405	K3III:	
					143209	78153	15^{h} 57^{m} 29.87^{s}	+39° 41′ 41.9″	6.30	0.88	396	K0	
2 G. Her			2		146084	79581	16^{h} 14^{m} 13.58^{s}	+05° 54′ 06.8″	6.30	1.25	334	K2III	
					150012	81425	16^{h} 37^{m} 48.03^{s}	+13° 41′ 13.9″	6.30	2.09	227	F5III-IV	
					160822	86506	17^{h} 40^{m} 41.23^{s}	+31° 17′ 15.6″	6.30	0.84	403	K0III	
					173494	91958	18^{h} 44^{m} 40.29^{s}	+23° 35′ 24.3″	6.30	3.06	145	F6V	
					171994	91279	18^{h} 37^{m} 09.05^{s}	+16° 11′ 53.4″	6.31	1.54	293	G8IV	
HD 163840					163840	87895	17^{h} 57^{m} 14.34^{s}	+23° 59′ 44.6″	6.32	4.04	93	G2V	Binary component is K2V
					166228	88754	18^{h} 07^{m} 06.29^{s}	+49° 42′ 37.4″	6.32	−0.40	721	A2V	
					155102	83816	17^{h} 07^{m} 46.71^{s}	+40° 30′ 58.1″	6.34	0.51	478	A2IV	
					157741	85187	17^{h} 24^{m} 33.80^{s}	+15° 36′ 21.7″	6.34	0.47	487	B9V	
					160765	86546	17^{h} 41^{m} 11.00^{s}	+15° 10′ 42.2″	6.34	0.79	420	A1V	
V831 Her				V831	165373	88528	18^{h} 04^{m} 40.20^{s}	+23° 56′ 31.8″	6.34	2.38	202	F0IV-V	δ Sct variable
V644 Her				V644	152830	82798	16^{h} 55^{m} 15.97^{s}	+13° 37′ 12.0″	6.35	1.87	256	F5II	δ Sct variable; spectroscopic binary
					153312	83007	16^{h} 57^{m} 42.30^{s}	+24° 22′ 52.7″	6.35	0.49	485	K0III	
					154301	83493	17^{h} 03^{m} 52.67^{s}	+19° 41′ 25.8″	6.35	−1.32	1116	A...	
					157257	84938	17^{h} 21^{m} 33.45^{s}	+16° 43′ 52.6″	6.35	−0.44	743	M2III	
V773 Her				V773	149822	81337	16^{h} 36^{m} 42.95^{s}	+15° 29′ 51.1″	6.36	0.73	436	B9sp...	α^{2} CVn variable
					153472	83013	16^{h} 57^{m} 50.19^{s}	+42° 30′ 45.2″	6.36	0.25	543	K3III	
					157373	84855	17^{h} 20^{m} 33.60^{s}	+48° 11′ 19.7″	6.36	3.35	131	F6Vawvar	
V642 Her				V642	159354	85934	17^{h} 33^{m} 42.77^{s}	+14° 50′ 30.4″	6.36	−0.36	720	M4IIIa	
					160950	86501	17^{h} 40^{m} 37.52^{s}	+43° 28′ 13.9″	6.36	0.98	388	K2	
					166411	88929	18^{h} 09^{m} 10.18^{s}	+30° 28′ 09.1″	6.36	0.71	440	K1III:	
					167304	89246	18^{h} 12^{m} 42.62^{s}	+41° 08′ 49.0″	6.36	0.54	476	K0III	
					157358	84934	17^{h} 21^{m} 31.23^{s}	+28° 45′ 29.2″	6.37	0.29	535	G0III	
V959 Her				V959	159968	86153	17^{h} 36^{m} 21.42^{s}	+27° 34′ 00.5″	6.37	−0.99	964	M1II	
					160835	86537	17^{h} 41^{m} 05.50^{s}	+24° 30′ 47.2″	6.37	−0.19	668	K1III+...	
					163075	87434	17^{h} 52^{m} 00.88^{s}	+46° 38′ 37.9″	6.37	1.21	350	K0III	
V1343 Her				V1343	169820	90337	18^{h} 25^{m} 55.23^{s}	+14° 57′ 58.6″	6.37	1.07	374	B9V	
					151627	82241	16^{h} 48^{m} 08.87^{s}	+13° 35′ 25.2″	6.38	−0.21	679	G5III	
					153226	82989	16^{h} 57^{m} 32.09^{s}	+13° 53′ 02.2″	6.38	2.44	200	K0V	
					158067	85313	17^{h} 26^{m} 00.86^{s}	+26° 52′ 43.3″	6.38	−0.20	676	A5IV	
					161369	86713	17^{h} 43^{m} 05.58^{s}	+44° 05′ 03.2″	6.38	−1.49	1221	K4III	
					165645	88565	18^{h} 05^{m} 00.81^{s}	+41° 56′ 45.8″	6.38	2.59	187	F0V	
					166620	88972	18^{h} 09^{m} 37.65^{s}	+38° 27′ 32.1″	6.38	6.15	36	K2V	
					159926	86130	17^{h} 36^{m} 08.10^{s}	+28° 11′ 06.1″	6.40	0.85	420	K5	
					154126	83365	17^{h} 02^{m} 17.09^{s}	+31° 53′ 02.6″	6.41	1.35	335	K0	
					165029	88429	18^{h} 03^{m} 14.57^{s}	+19° 36′ 47.4″	6.41	0.93	407	A0V	
					149632	81231	16^{h} 35^{m} 26.29^{s}	+17° 03′ 26.4″	6.42	0.37	528	A2V	
V974 Her				V974	164447	88172	18^{h} 00^{m} 27.65^{s}	+19° 30′ 20.8″	6.42	−2.06	1622	B8Vn	Be star
					159026	85688	17^{h} 30^{m} 40.21^{s}	+38° 52′ 55.8″	6.43	−0.98	991	F6III	
					162734	87427	17^{h} 51^{m} 58.46^{s}	+15° 19′ 34.6″	6.43	0.78	441	K0III	
34 Her		34			149081	80809	16^{h} 30^{m} 06.08^{s}	+48° 57′ 40.4″	6.44	1.21	362	A1V	
					155061	83834	17^{h} 08^{m} 00.70^{s}	+31° 12′ 22.5″	6.44	−1.04	1022	K2	
					154713	83593	17^{h} 05^{m} 04.94^{s}	+43° 48′ 44.1″	6.45	0.66	470	A3IV	
					168323	89683	18^{h} 18^{m} 07.72^{s}	+23° 17′ 49.0″	6.45	−2.10	1672	K5	
					162132	87045	17^{h} 47^{m} 08.05^{s}	+47° 36′ 44.0″	6.47	0.87	429	A2Vs	
11 G. Her			11		149908	81404	16^{h} 37^{m} 33.76^{s}	+05° 16′ 39.2″	6.48	0.89	428	K0	
					151044	81800	16^{h} 42^{m} 27.69^{s}	+49° 56′ 12.1″	6.48	4.14	96	F8V	
					157853	85149	17^{h} 24^{m} 02.26^{s}	+38° 34′ 57.7″	6.48	0.39	540	F8IV	
V771 Her				V771	164429	88030	17^{h} 58^{m} 52.31^{s}	+45° 28′ 34.2″	6.48	0.70	466	B9sp...	α^{2} CVn variable
					170829	90729	18^{h} 30^{m} 41.64^{s}	+20° 48′ 56.5″	6.49	3.72	117	G8IV	
					170111	90398	18^{h} 26^{m} 40.93^{s}	+26° 26′ 57.2″	6.50	−0.40	782	B3V	
49 Her		49		V823	152308	82526	16^{h} 52^{m} 04.84^{s}	+14° 58′ 27.1″	6.51	0.80	452	B9.5p (Cr)	V823 Her; α^{2} CVn variable
X Her				X	144205	78574	16^{h} 02^{m} 39.23^{s}	+47° 14′ 24.7″	6.52	0.82	449	M6e	
41 Her		41	14		151090	81991	16^{h} 45^{m} 00.11^{s}	+06° 05′ 19.6″	6.55	3.17	155	G5	
HD 162826					162826	87382	17^{h} 51^{m} 53.74^{s}	+40° 04′ 20.9″	6.55	3.92	110	F8V	solar analogue
48 Her		48			151937	82324	16^{h} 49^{m} 15.32^{s}	+29° 57′ 52.3″	6.59	−0.75	959	K1II-III	
14 Her		14			145675	79248	16^{h} 10^{m} 24.21^{s}	+43° 49′ 06.1″	6.61	5.32	59	K0V	has two planets (b & c)
49 Ser		(49)			145958	79492	16^{h} 13^{m} 18.34^{s}	+13° 31′ 40.5″	6.68	4.75	79	G8V	
19 Her		19			147025	79889	16^{h} 18^{m} 23.66^{s}	+25° 53′ 48.1″	6.70	0.76	502	G8III	
U Her				U	148206	80488	16^{h} 25^{m} 47.70^{s}	+18° 53′ 33.0″	6.70	−2.23	1989	M7III	Mira-type variable
HD 154345					154345	83389	17^{h} 02^{m} 36.40^{s}	+47° 04′ 54.8″	6.74	5.46	59	G8V	has a planet (b)
88 Her	z	88			162732	87280	17^{h} 50^{m} 03.33^{s}	+48° 23′ 38.8″	6.78	−1.05	1199	Bpsh	
32 Her		32			149420	81066	16^{h} 33^{m} 29.15^{s}	+30° 29′ 56.7″	6.87	0.98	492	F0III	
36 Her		36			150379	81634	16^{h} 40^{m} 35.15^{s}	+04° 12′ 26.0″	6.92	2.07	304	A3IV	
38 Her		38	13		150525	81717	16^{h} 41^{m} 30.2^{s}	+04° 52′ 18.8″	6.96	1.47	408	A0	
HD 164922					164922	88348	18^{h} 02^{m} 30.86^{s}	+26° 18′ 46.8″	7.01	5.31	72	K0V	has three planets (b, c & d)
31 Her		31			149141	80927	16^{h} 31^{m} 30.59^{s}	+33° 30′ 49.3″	7.09	1.76	379	A0	
HD 164595					164595	88194	18^{h} 00^{m} 39.0^{s}	+29° 34′ 19″	7.10		94	G2V	has a planet (b)
46 Her		46			151237	82000	16^{h} 45^{m} 05.2^{s}	+28° 21′ 28.3″	7.14	0.25	780	F8II+...	
33 Her		33			149805	81354	16^{h} 36^{m} 51.64^{s}	+07° 06′ 25.9″	7.29	0.85	638	B9	
HD 155358					155358	83949	17^{h} 09^{m} 34.62^{s}	+33° 21′ 21.1″	7.5	4.31	141	G0	has two planets (b & c)
13 Her		13			146279		16^{h} 15^{m} 01.28^{s}	+11° 29′ 24.8″	7.55	2.56	325	F0	
HD 145934					145934		16^{h} 13^{m} 10.0^{s}	+13° 14′ 22″	7.6			K0	has a planet (b)
HD 158038					158038	85294	17^{h} 25^{m} 45^{s}	+27° 18′ 12″	7.64		338	K2III	has a planet (b)
HD 148284					148284	80489	16^{h} 25^{m} 48.0^{s}	+30° 15′ 54″	8.0		307	G	has a planet (b)
Gliese 638					151288				8.10	8.15	31.9		
HD 160508					160508	86394	17^{h} 39^{m} 13.0^{s}	+26° 45′ 27″	8.11		301	F8V	has a planet (b)
HD 149026					149026	80838	16^{h} 30^{m} 29.62^{s}	+38° 20′ 50.3″	8.15	3.67	257	G0	Ogma, has a transiting planet (b)
HD 148164					148164	80484	16^{h} 25^{m} 45.0^{s}	+11° 55′ 09″	8.23		235	F8	has two planets (b and c)
HD 156668					156668	84607	17^{h} 17^{m} 40.49^{s}	+29° 13′ 38.0″	8.42	6.52	78	K2V	has a planet (b)
HD 147506					147506	80076	16^{h} 20^{m} 36.36^{s}	+41° 02′ 53.1″	8.71	3.31	419	F8	Hunor; has a transiting planet HAT-P-2b
HD 152843					152843		16^{h} 55^{m} 08.36^{s}	+20° 29′ 28.8″	8.85		356	G0	has two transiting planets (b, c)
HD 146389					146389		16^{h} 15^{m} 50^{s}	+10° 01′ 57″	9.42		446	F8	Irena; WASP-38, has a transiting planet (b)
Gliese 649						83043	16^{h} 58^{m} 08.85^{s}	+25° 44′ 39.0″	9.62	9.55	34	M1.5V	has a planet (b)
HAT-P-14							17^{h} 20^{m} 27.87^{s}	+38° 14′ 31.9″	9.98	3.41	670	F	Franz; has a transiting planet (b)
Gliese 623						80346	16^{h} 24^{m} 09.32^{s}	+48° 21′ 10.5″	10.27	10.74	26	M3V	nearby binary star
WASP-86							17^{h} 50^{m} 33.7^{s}	+36° 34′ 13″	10.66			F7	has a transiting planet (b)
HAT-P-67							17^{h} 06^{m} 27.0^{s}	+44° 46′ 37″	10.69		1044	F	has a transiting planet (b)
GSC 02620-00648							17^{h} 53^{m} 13.06^{s}	+37° 12′ 42.4″	11.59	3.37	1440	F	has a transiting planet TrES-4
WASP-103							16^{h} 37^{m} 16.0^{s}	+07° 11′ 00″	12.00		1533	F8V	has a transiting planet (b)
WASP-148							16^{h} 56^{m} 31.0^{s}	+44° 18′ 09″	12.00		809		has two transiting planets (b and c)
TOI-2119							16^{h} 17^{m} 43.21^{s}	+26° 18′ 15.1″	12.36		103	M	has a transiting brown dwarf (b)
GSC 03089-00929							17^{h} 52^{m} 07.02^{s}	+37° 32′ 46.2″	12.40			G	Pipoltr; has a transiting planet TrES-3
HAT-P-18							17^{h} 05^{m} 24^{s}	+33° 00′ 45″	12.76			K	has a transiting planet (b)
WASP-92							16^{h} 26^{m} 46.1^{s}	+51° 02′ 28″	13.18		1729	F7	has a transiting planet (b)
HAT-P-55							17^{h} 37^{m} 05.5^{s}	+25° 43′ 52″	13.21		1566		has a transiting planet (b)
WASP-135							17^{h} 49^{m} 08.0^{s}	+29° 52′ 45″	13.3		978	G5	has a transiting planet (b)
Table legend: • Name = Proper name • B = Bayer designation • F or/and G. = Flamsteed designation or Gould designation • Var = Variable-star designation • HD = Henry Draper Catalogue designation number • HIP = Hipparcos Catalogue designation number • RA = Right ascension for the Epoch/Equinox J2000.0 • Dec = Declination for the Epoch/Equinox J2000.0 • vis. mag. = visual magnitude (m or m_{v}), also known as apparent magnitude • abs. mag. = absolute magnitude (M_{v}) • Dist. (ly) = Distance in light-years from Earth • Sp. class = Spectral class of the star in the stellar classification system • Notes = Common name(s) or alternate name(s); comments; notable properties [for example: multiple star status, range of variability if it is a variable star, exoplanets, etc.]

== See also ==
- List of stars by constellation
