= Xi Herculis =

Star in the constellation Hercules

- Location of ξ Herculis (circled in red)

Observation data Epoch J2000.0 Equinox J2000.0 (ICRS)
- Constellation: Hercules
- Right ascension: 17^{h} 57^{m} 45.88567^{s}
- Declination: +29° 14′ 52.3660″
- Apparent magnitude (V): 3.70

Characteristics
- Evolutionary stage: red clump
- Spectral type: G8 III
- U−B color index: +0.66
- B−V color index: +0.93

Astrometry
Radial velocity (R_{v})	−1.65±0.17 km/s
Proper motion (μ)	RA: 81.919 mas/yr Dec.: −18.962 mas/yr
Parallax (π)	23.8544±0.1068 mas
Distance	136.7 ± 0.6 ly (41.9 ± 0.2 pc)
Absolute magnitude (M_{V})	+0.62

Details
Mass	2.01 M_{☉}
Radius	9.94±0.09 R_{☉}
Luminosity	57.2±2.1 L_{☉}
Surface gravity (log g)	2.87±0.09 cgs
Temperature	5,032±48 K
Metallicity [Fe/H]	+0.09±0.04 dex
Rotation	67 d
Rotational velocity (v sin i)	2.8 km/s
Age	2.48 Gyr

Other designations
- ξ Her, 92 Her, BD+29°3156, HD 163993, HIP 87933, HR 6703, SAO 85590

Database references
SIMBAD	data

Xi Herculis is a solitary star located within the northern constellation of Hercules. The star is visible to the naked eye with an apparent visual magnitude of 3.70. Based upon an annual parallax shift of 23.85 mas as seen from Earth, it is located 137 light years from the Sun. At that distance, the visual magnitude of the star is diminished by an extinction factor of 0.05 due to interstellar dust. It is a suspected member of the Sirius stream of co-moving stars.

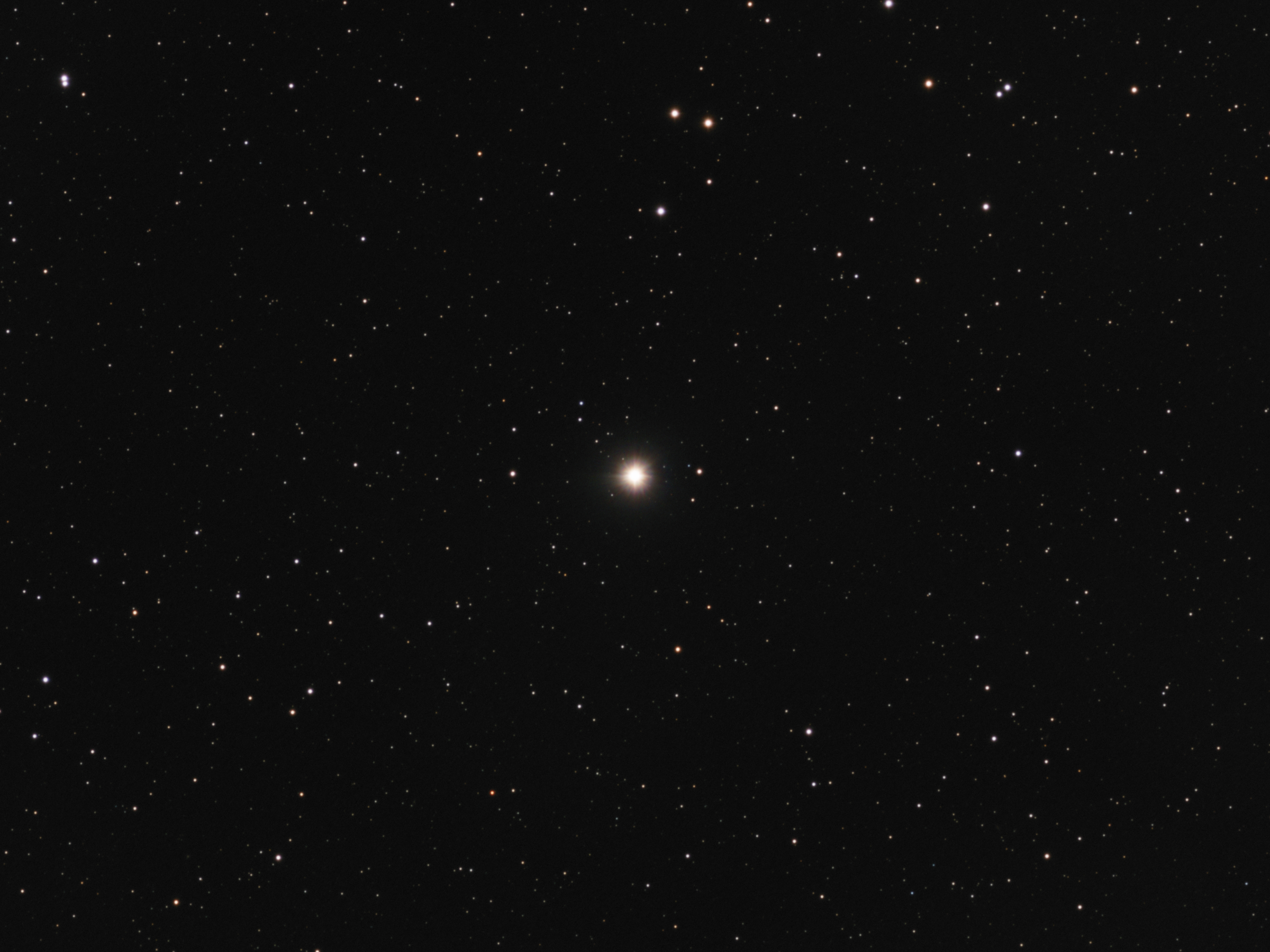
ξ Herculis in optical light

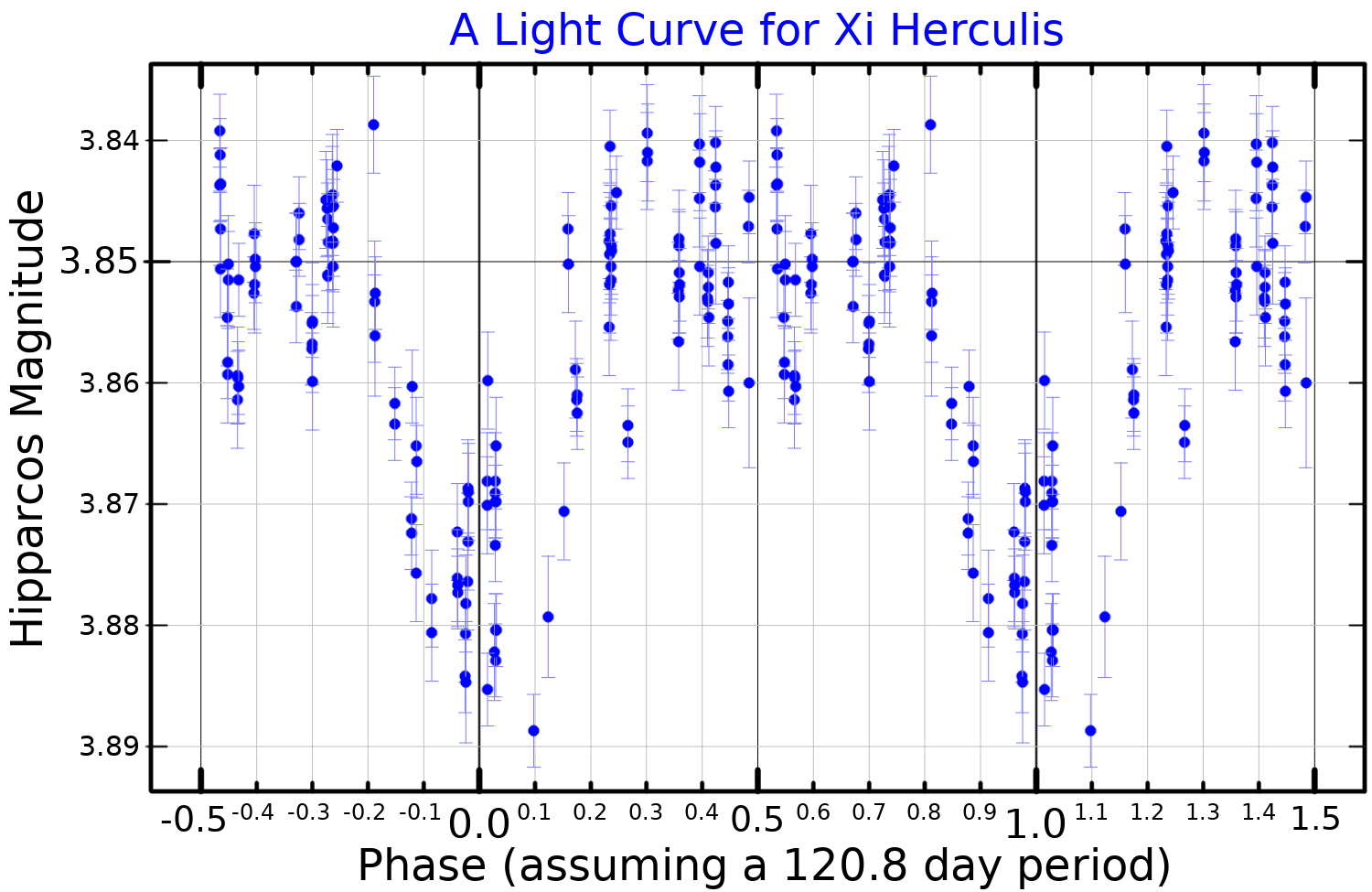
A light curve for Xi Herculis, plotted from Hipparcos data

This is an evolved G-type giant star with a stellar classification of G8 III. It is a red clump star, which means it is on the horizontal branch and generating energy through the thermonuclear fusion of hydrogen at its core. The star is emitting X-rays with a luminosity of 3.03×10^{30} erg s^{−1} in the 0.3–10 keV band. It has twice the mass of the Sun but, at the age of two and a half billion years, it has expanded to 10 times the Sun's radius. The star is radiating 57 times the solar luminosity from its photosphere at an effective temperature of 5,032 K.

Xi Herculis was discovered to be a variable star when the Hipparcos data was analyzed. It is a semiregular variable star, oscillating in brightness by 3 hundredths of a magnitude, over a period of 120.8 days.

== Chinese name ==
In R. H. Allen's book Star Names: Their Lore and Meaning, this star, together with ν Her and 99 Her (b Herculis) represent the state of Zhongshan (or Chung Shan, "the Middle Mountain"), but in Chinese literature, that name is applied to ο Her.

== Markov 1, the mini teapot ==
One third of a degree to the north-northwest of Xi Herculis is the location of a telescopic asterism in the shape of a teapot. This teapot (Markov 1) could be seen as a somewhat twisted small equivalent of the large and easy to recognize teapot asterism in the constellation Sagittarius.
