= U Herculis =

The Bayer designation u Herculis and the variable star designation U Herculis are distinct. Due to technical limitations, both designations link here. For the star

- u Herculis, see 68 Herculis
- U Herculis, see HD 148206

== See also ==
- υ Herculis
