= HR 6594 =

Binary star system in the constellation of Hercules

Observation data Epoch J2000 Equinox J2000
- Constellation: Hercules
- Right ascension: 17^{h} 41^{m} 58.632^{s}
- Declination: +15° 57′ 08.76″
- Apparent magnitude (V): 5.54

Characteristics
- Evolutionary stage: Main sequence
- Spectral type: F4 Vw
- U−B color index: −0.05
- B−V color index: +0.387±0.012

Astrometry
Radial velocity (R_{v})	−43.7 km/s
Proper motion (μ)	RA: −1.868 mas/yr Dec.: +101.120 mas/yr
Parallax (π)	28.5131±0.0532 mas
Distance	114.4 ± 0.2 ly (35.07 ± 0.07 pc)
Absolute magnitude (M_{V})	+2.74

Details

HR 6594 A
Mass	1.33 M_{☉}
Radius	1.91 R_{☉}
Luminosity	5.8 L_{☉}
Surface gravity (log g)	4.00 cgs
Temperature	6,488 K
Metallicity [Fe/H]	−0.04 dex
Rotational velocity (v sin i)	31.7 km/s
Age	1.2 Gyr

Other designations
- BD−16°3256, HD 160910, HIP 86623, HR 6594, SAO 103033

Database references
SIMBAD	data

HR 6594 is the Bright Star Catalogue designation for a binary star system in the northern constellation of Hercules. It is faintly visible to the naked eye with an apparent visual magnitude of 5.54; according to the Bortle scale, it is sufficiently bright to be visible from dark suburban skies. The distance to this system, as determined using parallax measurements, is about 114 light years. It is drifting closer with a heliocentric radial velocity of −43.7 km/s, and is predicted to come as near as 47 light-years in 686,000 years. On the celestial sphere it is located near the star Alpha Ophiuchi; their projected separation is just 3 light years, although their actual separation is much greater.

The primary is an F-type main sequence star with a stellar classification of F4 Vw, where the w indicates relatively weak metallic features in the ultraviolet spectrum. This star has 133% of the Sun's mass 191% of the solar radius. It is spinning with a projected rotational velocity of 31.7 km/s, and is around 1.2 billion years old. The effective temperature of the outer atmosphere is 6,488 K. giving it the yellow-white hue of an F-type star. The abundance of elements other than hydrogen or helium, what astronomers term the metallicity, is similar to that in the Sun.

It has a magnitude 9.38 companion star orbiting with a 144-year period, a semimajor axis spanning 1.04 arcseconds, and an eccentricity of 0.42. There is a third, visual companion of magnitude 14.46 at an angular separation of 154.70 arcseconds along a position angle of 271°, as of 2001.
