= 98 Herculis =

Aging red giant star in the constellation Hercules

Observation data Epoch J2000 Equinox ICRS
- Constellation: Hercules
- Right ascension: 18^{h} 06^{m} 01.90000^{s}
- Declination: +22° 13′ 07.9396″
- Apparent magnitude (V): 4.96

Characteristics
- Evolutionary stage: AGB
- Spectral type: M3-SIII or M3IIIBa0.2
- B−V color index: 1.656±0.062
- Variable type: suspected

Astrometry
Radial velocity (R_{v})	−19.48±0.21 km/s
Proper motion (μ)	RA: −12.028 mas/yr Dec.: −6.067 mas/yr
Parallax (π)	5.5201±0.1610 mas
Distance	590 ± 20 ly (181 ± 5 pc)
Absolute magnitude (M_{V})	−1.78

Details
Mass	1.35 M_{☉}
Radius	85.39+10.72 −8.50 R_{☉}
Luminosity	1,329.7±44.7 L_{☉}
Surface gravity (log g)	1.45 cgs
Temperature	3,772+203 −217 K
Metallicity [Fe/H]	−0.08 dex

Other designations
- 98 Her, NSV 10208, BD+22°3273, HD 165625, HIP 88657, HR 6765, SAO 85725

Database references
SIMBAD	data

98 Herculis is a single star located approximately 590 light years from the Sun in the northern constellation Hercules. It is visible to the naked eye as a dim, red-hued point of light with an apparent visual magnitude of 4.96. The brightness of the star is diminished by an extinction of 0.19 due to interstellar dust. The star is moving closer to the Earth with a heliocentric radial velocity of −19 km/s.

This is an aging red giant star on the asymptotic giant branch with a stellar classification of M3-SIII, where the suffix notation indicating this is an S-type star. It is a mild barium star with an intensity class of 0.2, and is a suspected variable star, although Percy and Shepherd (1992) were unable to confirm this. With the hydrogen at its core exhausted, the star has expanded to around 85 times the Sun's radius. It is radiating 1,330 times the luminosity of the Sun from its swollen photosphere at an effective temperature of 3,772 K.
