= 41 Herculis =

Binary star in the constellation Hercules

Observation data Epoch J2000 Equinox ICRS
- Constellation: Hercules
- 41 Herculis
- Right ascension: 16^{h} 44^{m} 59.9853^{s}
- Declination: +06° 05′ 17.364″
- Apparent magnitude (V): +6.55
- Ross 643
- Right ascension: 16^{h} 44^{m} 59.9658^{s}
- Declination: +06° 02′ 37.111″
- Apparent magnitude (V): 10.40

Characteristics

41 Herculis
- Evolutionary stage: Red-giant branch
- Spectral type: G8
- B−V color index: 0.89±0.01

Ross 643
- Evolutionary stage: main sequence
- Spectral type: K3

Astrometry

41 Herculis
Radial velocity (R_{v})	−6.47±0.02 km/s
Proper motion (μ)	RA: −213.497 mas/yr Dec.: −257.504 mas/yr
Parallax (π)	22.7816±0.0216 mas
Distance	143.2 ± 0.1 ly (43.90 ± 0.04 pc)
Absolute magnitude (M_{V})	+3.24

Ross 643
Radial velocity (R_{v})	−7.03±0.16 km/s
Proper motion (μ)	RA: −215.617 mas/yr Dec.: −258.546 mas/yr
Parallax (π)	22.7631±0.0182 mas
Distance	143.3 ± 0.1 ly (43.93 ± 0.04 pc)

Position (relative to 41 Herculis)
Epoch of observation	2016
Angular distance	163.1″
Position angle	191°
Projected separation	7,150 AU

Details

41 Herculis
Mass	1.15±0.06 M_{☉}
Radius	2.91±0.11 R_{☉}
Luminosity	5.50+0.38 −0.37 L_{☉}
Surface gravity (log g)	3.57±0.14 cgs
Temperature	5,077±92 K
Metallicity [Fe/H]	−0.23±0.04 dex
Rotation	9.3 days
Rotational velocity (v sin i)	5.37 km/s
Age	5.98±1.11 Gyr

Ross 643
Mass	0.653±0.052 M_{☉}
Radius	0.661±0.043 R_{☉}
Luminosity	0.182±0.005 L_{☉}
Surface gravity (log g)	4.59 cgs
Temperature	4,641±155 K
Metallicity [Fe/H]	−0.16 dex

Other designations
- WDS J16450+0605
- 41 Her: BD+06°3288, HD 151090, HIP 81991, G 17-35, 138-61, TIC 395-2558-1
- Ross 643: HIP 81988, G 17-34, 138-60, LTT 19463, NLTT 43481, Ross 643, TYC 395-2352-1

Database references
SIMBAD	41 Herculis
- Ross 643

41 Herculis is a binary star in the constellation Hercules. At an apparent magnitude of +6.55, it is very close to the threshold for naked eye visibility, being visible only in locations far from light pollution. Parallax measurements give a distance of 143 light-years (43.9 parsecs).

== Characteristics ==
The spectrum of 41 Herculis matches a spectral class of G8. Stellar evolution models suggest it is an evolved star that is in the base of the red-giant branch. The star is estimated to be six billion years old, has 1.15 times the mass of the Sun and 2.91 times the Sun's radius. It radiates 5.5 times the Sun's luminosity from its photosphere at an effective temperature of 5,077 K. This temperature give it the yellow hue typical of a G-type star.

41 Herculis has a common proper motion companion named Ross 643 which is separated by 163.1" from the primary, yielding a projected separation of 7,150 au at the system's distance. It has a spectral type K3, has 0.65 times the mass of the Sun and 61% of the Sun's radius. It irradiates 18.2% of the Sun's luminosity from its photosphere at an effective temperature of 4,641 K, giving it an orange hue typical of K-type stars.

== Planetary system ==
In 2026, a likely planet was discovered around the primary, from the detection of its gravitational pull in the discrepancy between the Hipparcos and Gaia proper motion measurements, taken over a 25-year baseline. Direct imaging and radial velocity data were used to constrain the orbit and mass of the planet, although the use of radial velocity and astrometry alone was enough to rule out stellar companions as the cause of the proper motion changes. The planet has an orbital period between 14.4 and 17.7 years, a semi-major axis of 6.4+0.6
−0.3 au and a mass of 9.5+5.4
−2.2 M_{J}. The mass constraint yields a 35% chance that it may be a brown dwarf rather than a planet.

The 41 Herculis planetary system
Companion (in order from star)	Mass	Semimajor axis (AU)	Orbital period (days)	Eccentricity	Inclination (°)	Radius
b	9.5+5.4 −2.2 M_{J}	6.4+0.6 −0.3	14.4–17.7	—	—	—
