= 52 Herculis =

Star in the constellation Hercules

- Location of 52 Herculis (circled in red)

Observation data Epoch J2000 Equinox ICRS
- Constellation: Hercules
- Right ascension: 16^{h} 49^{m} 14.21821^{s}
- Declination: +45° 58′ 59.9620″
- Apparent magnitude (V): 4.82 (4.87 + 8.85[9.0 + 9.1])

Characteristics
- Evolutionary stage: main sequence
- Spectral type: A1VpSiSrCr + K0V?
- B−V color index: 0.087±0.003
- Variable type: α^{2} CVn

Astrometry
Radial velocity (R_{v})	−1.6±0.5 km/s
Proper motion (μ)	RA: +22.57 mas/yr Dec.: −51.35 mas/yr
Parallax (π)	18.10±0.34 mas
Distance	180 ± 3 ly (55 ± 1 pc)
Absolute magnitude (M_{V})	1.16 + 5.47 + 5.57

Orbit
Primary	52 Her A
Name	52 Her B
Period (P)	56.4±0.3 yr
Semi-major axis (a)	0.279±0.005″
Eccentricity (e)	0.13±0.02
Inclination (i)	37.4+2.6 −2.8°
Longitude of the node (Ω)	57.5°
Periastron epoch (T)	1991.2
Argument of periastron (ω) (secondary)	69.4°

Details

52 Her A
Mass	2.19+0.14 −0.22 M_{☉}
Radius	2.30±0.11 R_{☉}
Luminosity	29.5+2.1 −2.0 L_{☉}
Surface gravity (log g)	4.06+0.05 −0.06 cgs
Temperature	8,840±190 K
Rotational velocity (v sin i)	23.2±1.4 km/s
Age	525+234 −162 Myr

Other designations
- 52 Her, V637 Her, BD+46°2220, HD 152107, HIP 82321, HR 6254, SAO 46305, WDS J16492+4559

Database references
SIMBAD	data

52 Herculis is a triple star system in the northern constellation of Hercules. It is visible to the naked eye as a faint point of light with a combined apparent visual magnitude of 4.82. Based upon parallax measurements, the system is located 180 light years away from the Sun. It is moving closer to the Earth with a heliocentric radial velocity of −1.6 km/s.

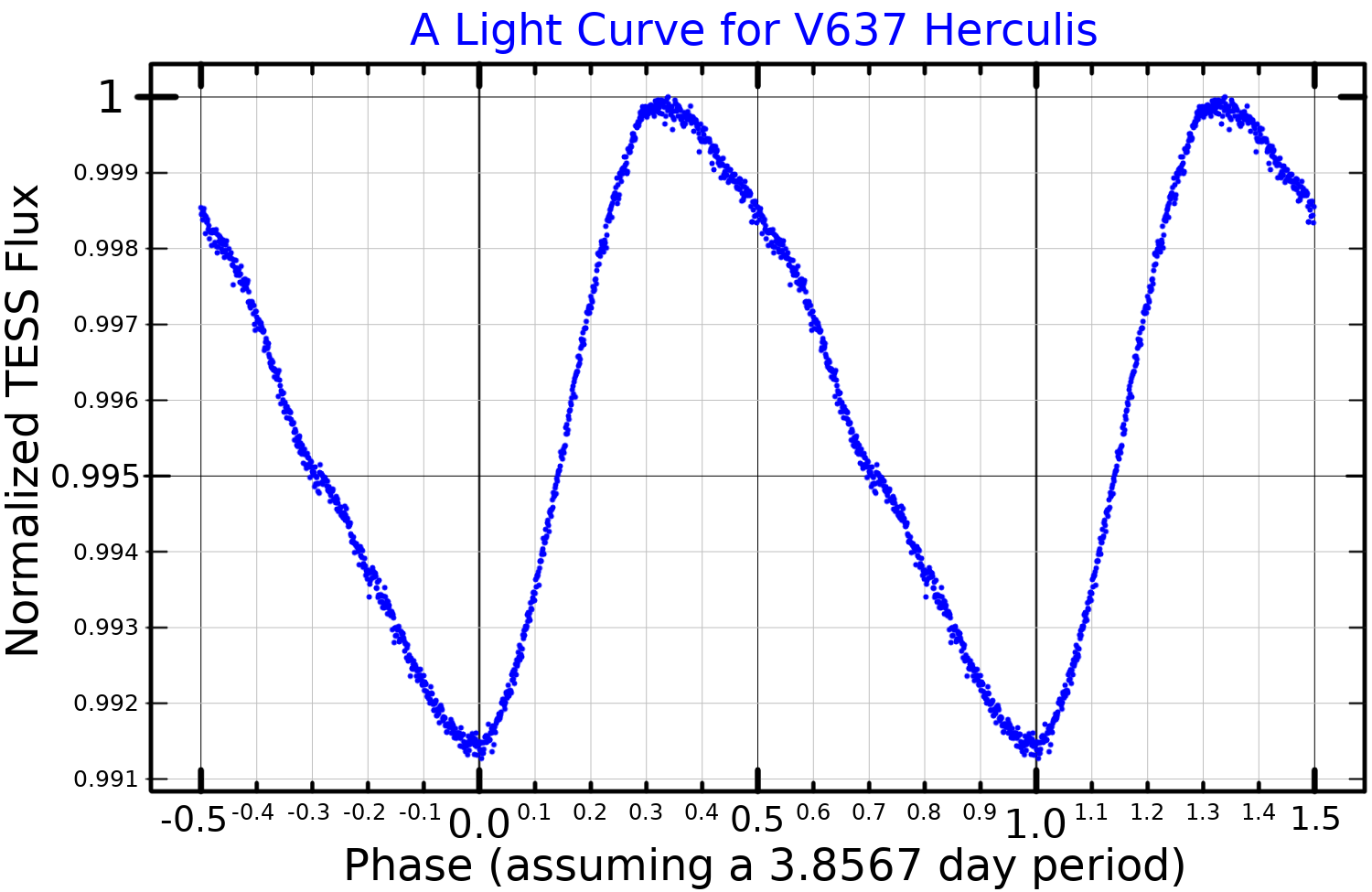
A light curve for V637 Herculis, plotted from TESS data

The primary member, designated component A, is a magnetic chemically peculiar star with a stellar classification of A1VpSiSrCr, appearing as an A-type main-sequence star with abnormal abundances of silicon, strontium, and chromium. It is an alpha^{2} Canum Venaticorum variable that ranges in brightness from visual magnitude 4.78 down to 4.85 with a period of 3.8567 days. The star is about 525 million years old with a projected rotational velocity of 23 km/s. It has 2.2 times the mass of the Sun and 2.3 times the Sun's radius. The star is radiating 29.5 times the Sun's luminosity from its photosphere at an effective temperature of 8,840 K.

The remaining components form a binary star system with an orbital period of 56 years, an angular semimajor axis of 0.279″, and an eccentricity of 0.13. They have an angular separation of 1.78″ from the primary. The total mass of the pair is 1.16±0.09 M_{☉} and they have a combined visual magnitude of 8.85. The brighter member of this pair is a suspected K-type main-sequence star with a class of K0V.
