= 106 Herculis =

Binary star system in the constellation Hercules

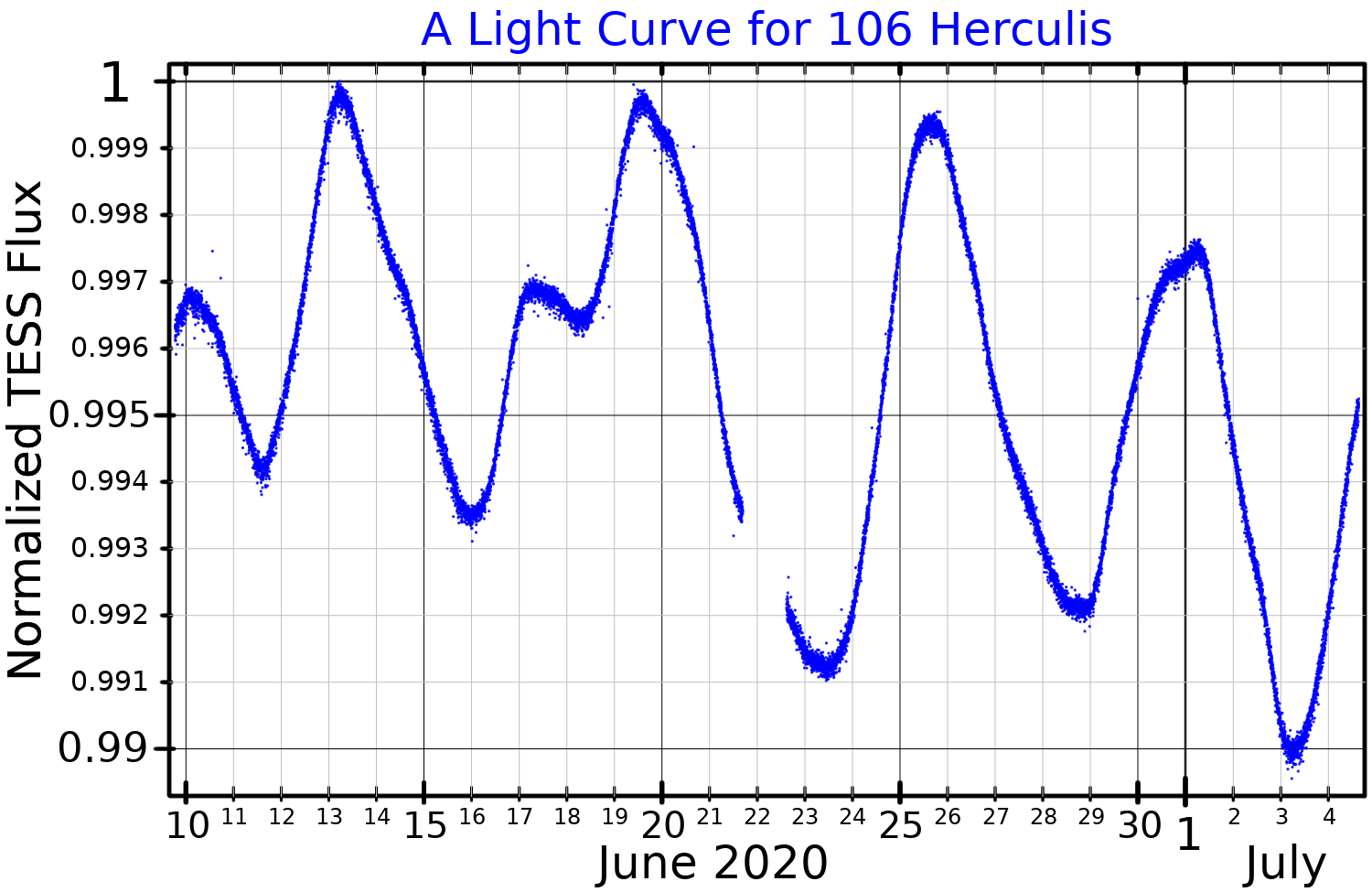
- A light curve for 106 Herculis, plotted from TESS data

Observation data Epoch J2000 Equinox ICRS
- Constellation: Hercules
- Right ascension: 18^{h} 20^{m} 17.91482^{s}
- Declination: +21° 57′ 40.6622″
- Apparent magnitude (V): 4.96

Characteristics
- Evolutionary stage: AGB
- Spectral type: M0 III
- U−B color index: +1.98
- B−V color index: +1.58
- Variable type: suspected SR

Astrometry
Radial velocity (R_{v})	−35.20±0.29 km/s
Proper motion (μ)	RA: +18.105 mas/yr Dec.: -59.631 mas/yr
Parallax (π)	8.5067±0.1739 mas
Distance	383 ± 8 ly (118 ± 2 pc)
Absolute magnitude (M_{V})	−0.664

Details
Radius	44.32+2.70 −5.89 R_{☉}
Luminosity	414.1±9.7 L_{☉}
Surface gravity (log g)	1.56±0.09 cgs
Temperature	3,789±6 K
Metallicity [Fe/H]	0.00±0.03 dex
Rotational velocity (v sin i)	5.0±1.0 km/s

Other designations
- 106 Her, NSV 24405, BD+21°3390, HD 168720, HIP 89861, HR 6868, SAO 85941

Database references
SIMBAD	data

106 Herculis is a variable star in the northern constellation Hercules. It is visible to the naked eye as a faint, red-hued point of light with a baseline apparent visual magnitude of 4.96. Based on its parallax, it is estimated to lie 383 light-years (117 parsecs) away from the Sun. The star is moving closer to the Earth with a heliocentric radial velocity of -35 km/s.

Eggleton and Tokovinin (2008) listed this as a suspected binary star system consisting of two roughly equal components. It appears as an ageing red giant with a stellar classification of M0III. This is a suspected semiregular variable star with a very small amplitude and a period of 40 days or more. Having exhausted the supply of hydrogen at its core, it has expanded to 44 times the Sun's radius. It is radiating around 414 times the luminosity of the Sun from its enlarged photosphere at an effective temperature of about 3,789 K.
