= 45 Herculis =

Star in the constellation Hercules

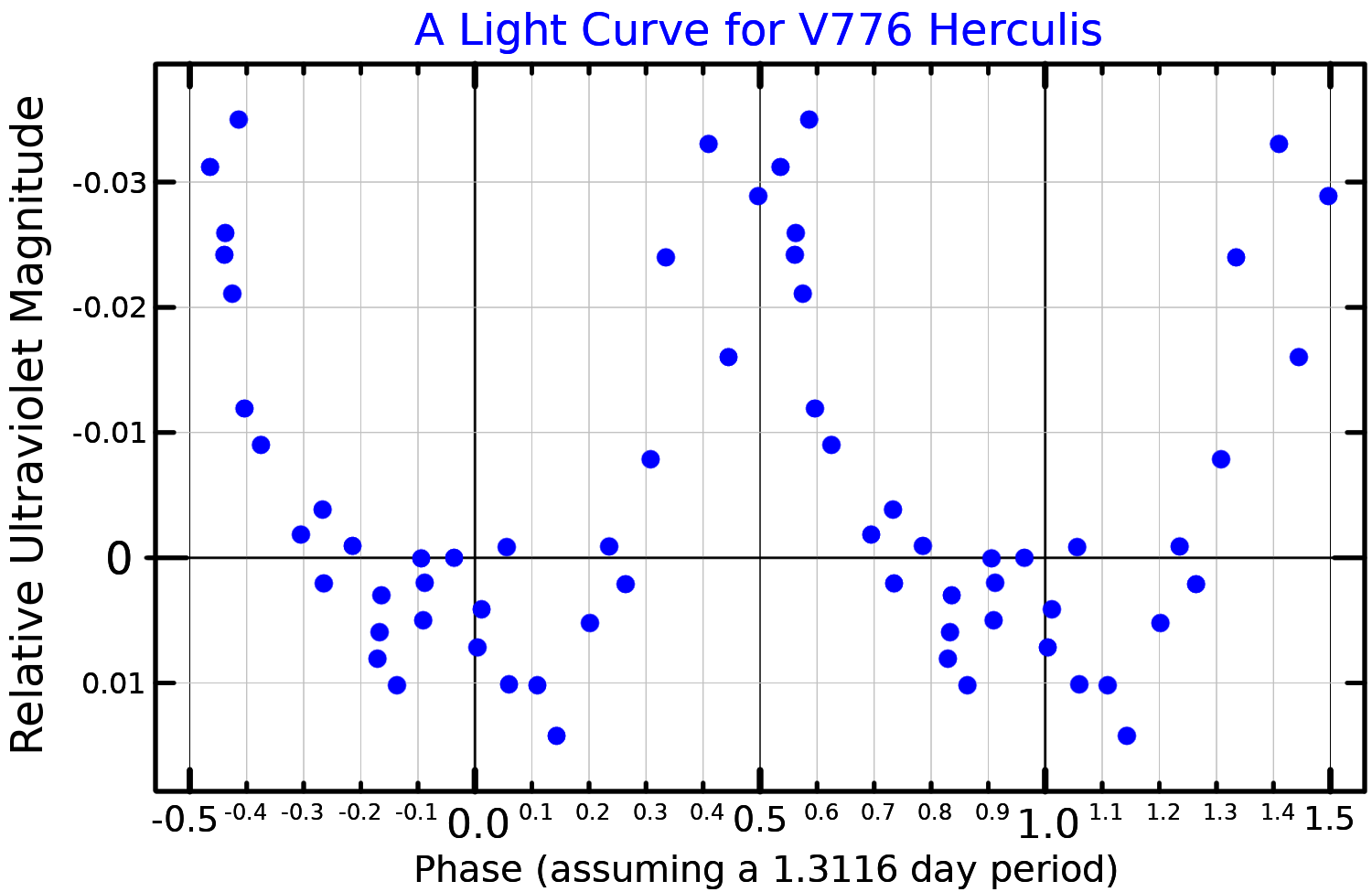
- An ultraviolet band light curve for V776 Herculis, adapted from Burke and Barr (1981)

Observation data Epoch J2000 Equinox ICRS
- Constellation: Hercules
- Right ascension: 16^{h} 47^{m} 46.41942^{s}
- Declination: +05° 14′ 48.2789″
- Apparent magnitude (V): 5.22

Characteristics
- Evolutionary stage: main sequence or subgiant
- Spectral type: A1 Vp Si or B9p Cr
- U−B color index: +0.005
- B−V color index: −0.025
- Variable type: α^{2} CVn

Astrometry
Radial velocity (R_{v})	−13.13±0.09 km/s
Proper motion (μ)	RA: −18.802 mas/yr Dec.: −38.735 mas/yr
Parallax (π)	8.1955±0.2169 mas
Distance	400 ± 10 ly (122 ± 3 pc)
Absolute magnitude (M_{V})	−0.18

Orbit
Period (P)	99.51±0.10 d
Eccentricity (e)	0.445±0.020
Argument of periastron (ω) (primary)	167.1±4.2°
Semi-amplitude (K_{1}) (primary)	4.75±0.12 km/s

Details
Mass	2.85±0.11 M_{☉}
Radius	4.3 R_{☉}
Luminosity	129.7 L_{☉}
Surface gravity (log g)	3.55 cgs
Temperature	9,400 K
Metallicity [Fe/H]	0.10 dex
Rotation	4.116476±0.000022 d
Rotational velocity (v sin i)	35.5 km/s
Age	351–469 Myr

Other designations
- l Her, 45 Her, V776 Herculis, BD+05°3272, HD 151525, HIP 82216, HR 6234, SAO 121865, WDS 16478+0515

Database references
SIMBAD	data

45 Herculis is a binary variable star in the northern constellation Hercules. It has the Bayer designation l Herculis and the variable star designation V776 Herculis. The Flamsteed designation for this star comes from the publication Historia Coelestis Britannica by John Flamsteed. It is the 45th star in Flamsteed list of stars in the constellation Hercules, and is visible to the naked eye with a baseline apparent visual magnitude of 5.22. Parallax measurements show this star to be about 400 light-years away from the Solar System. It is moving closer to the Earth with a heliocentric radial velocity of −16 km/s.

Cowley et at. (1969) assigned this object a classification of B9p Cr, while Abt and Morrell (1995) found a class of A1 Vp Si. Both indicate this is a late B- or early A-type chemically peculiar, or Ap star, with abundance anomalies in chromium or silicon. It is classified as a magnetic Ap star, although its magnetic field is unusually weak for a star of this class. It is an Alpha^{2} Canum Venaticorum variable that ranges in visual magnitude from 5.21 down to 5.27. The star has 2.9 times the mass of the Sun and 4.9 times the Sun's radius. It is radiating 120 times the Sun's luminosity from its photosphere at an effective temperature of 9,333 K. The exact evolutionary state of 45 Her is unclear, but it is near the end of its main sequence life—just before, on, or shortly after the hook that marks the transition to a subgiant.

Although 45 Herculis was long thought to be a solitary star, a 2023 study confirmed that 45 Herculis is a single-lined spectroscopic binary. The pair of stars orbit each other every 99.51 days on a moderately eccentric orbit. The secondary star is likely a low-mass star.
