= 69 Herculis =

Star in the constellation Hercules

- Location of 69 Herculis (circled in red)

Observation data Epoch J2000 Equinox ICRS
- Constellation: Hercules
- Right ascension: 17^{h} 17^{m} 40.25320^{s}
- Declination: +37° 17′ 29.4226″
- Apparent magnitude (V): 4.63 (4.66 + 8.68)

Characteristics
- Evolutionary stage: main sequence
- Spectral type: A2V
- B−V color index: 0.043±0.003

Astrometry
Radial velocity (R_{v})	−9.90±1.78 km/s
Proper motion (μ)	RA: −43.05 mas/yr Dec.: +64.36 mas/yr
Parallax (π)	18.6546±0.0849 mas
Distance	174.8 ± 0.8 ly (53.6 ± 0.2 pc)
Absolute magnitude (M_{V})	0.99

Details

69 Her A
Mass	2.12 M_{☉}
Radius	2.2 R_{☉}
Luminosity	36.64 L_{☉}
Surface gravity (log g)	4.02 cgs
Temperature	9,141 K
Metallicity [Fe/H]	0.29 dex
Rotational velocity (v sin i)	141 km/s
Age	155 Myr

Other designations
- e Her, 69 Her, BD+37°2864, HD 156729, HIP 84606, HR 6436, SAO 65921

Database references
SIMBAD	data

69 Herculis is a binary star system in the northern constellation Hercules. It has the Bayer designation e Herculis, while 69 Herculis is the Flamsteed designation. This object is visible to the naked eye as a faint, white-hued star with a combined apparent visual magnitude of 4.63. The distance to this system can be estimated from parallax measurements, which yields a range of 175 light years. It is moving closer to the Earth with a heliocentric radial velocity of −10 km/s.

The magnitude 4.66 primary, designated component A, is an A-type main-sequence star with a stellar classification of A2V. It is 155 million years old with 2.12 times the mass of the Sun. The star is spinning with a projected rotational velocity of 155 km/s, which is creating an equatorial bulge that is 5% larger than the star's polar radius. It is about 2.2 times the size of the Sun and is radiating 37 times the Sun's luminosity from its photosphere at an effective temperature of 9,141 K.

The secondary, component B, is magnitude 8.68 star with an angular separation of 0.840″ from the primary, as of 2008. X-ray emission has been detected from this system. As A-type stars are not expected to be X-ray sources, this emission is most likely coming from the companion.
