= Sigma Herculis =

Binary star in the constellation Hercules

- Location of σ Herculis (circled in red)

Observation data Epoch J2000.0 Equinox J2000.0 (ICRS)
- Constellation: Hercules
- Right ascension: 16^{h} 34^{m} 06.18334^{s}
- Declination: +42° 26′ 13.3455″
- Apparent magnitude (V): 4.18 (4.20 + 7.70)

Characteristics
- Spectral type: B9 V (B7 + A9)
- U−B color index: −0.14
- B−V color index: −0.03

Astrometry
Radial velocity (R_{v})	−10.90±1.78 km/s
Proper motion (μ)	RA: −7.54 mas/yr Dec.: +59.42 mas/yr
Parallax (π)	10.36±0.46 mas
Distance	310 ± 10 ly (97 ± 4 pc)
Absolute magnitude (M_{V})	−0.72

Orbit
Period (P)	2,706.19±4.89 d
Semi-major axis (a)	0.07621±0.00027″
Eccentricity (e)	0.5135±0.0028
Inclination (i)	105.25±0.51°
Longitude of the node (Ω)	14.95±0.47°
Periastron epoch (T)	50665.4 ± 2.68
Argument of periastron (ω) (secondary)	184.97±0.40°

Details

σ Her A
Mass	2.60 M_{☉}
Radius	4.91 R_{☉}
Luminosity	230 L_{☉}
Surface gravity (log g)	3.78±0.14 cgs
Temperature	9,794±333 K
Rotational velocity (v sin i)	280 km/s
Age	404 Myr

σ Her B
Mass	1.5±0.5 M_{☉}
Luminosity	7.4 L_{☉}

Other designations
- σ Her, 35 Her, BD+42°2724, HD 149630, HIP 81126, HR 6168, SAO 46161.

Database references
SIMBAD	data

Sigma Herculis, Latinized from σ Her, is a binary star system in the northern constellation of Hercules. It has a combined apparent visual magnitude of 4.18, making it bright enough to be visible to the naked eye. Based upon an annual parallax shift of 10.36 mas as seen from Earth, Sigma Herculis is located about 310 light years away from the Sun.

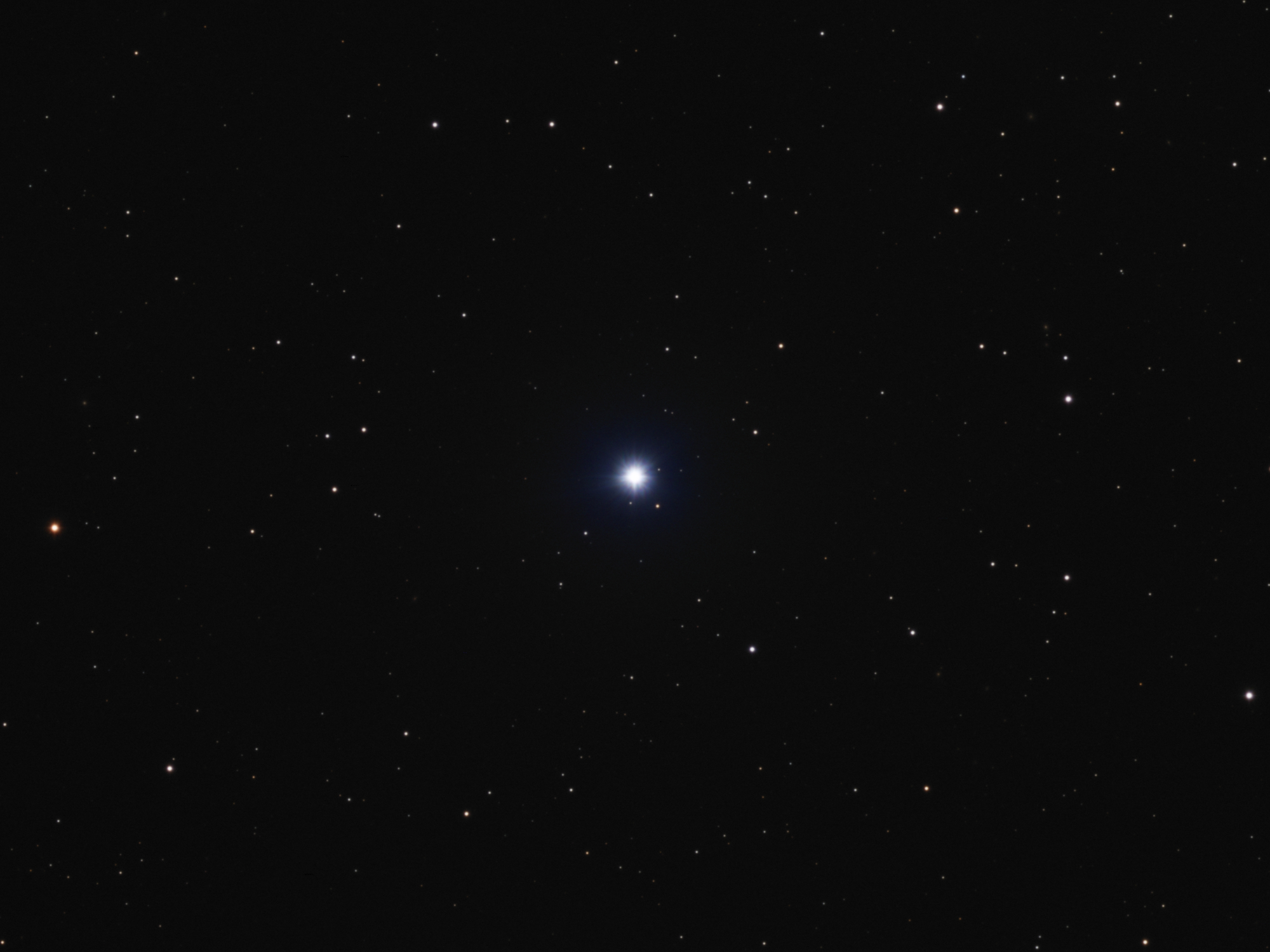
σ Herculis in optical light

The components of this binary system have a separation of 7 AU, and are orbiting their common barycenter with a period of 7.4 years and an eccentricity of 0.5. The primary, component A, is magnitude 4.20 B-type main sequence star with a stellar classification of B9 V. At an age of around 404 million years, it is spinning rapidly with a projected rotational velocity of 280 km/s. This is giving the star an oblate shape with an equatorial bulge that is an estimated 18% larger than the polar radius. The star has an estimated 2.60 times the mass of the Sun, 4.91 times the Sun's radius, and is radiating 230 times the solar luminosity from its photosphere at an effective temperature of 9,794 K.

The primary is emitting an infrared excess, suggesting the presence of an orbiting debris disk with a temperature of 80 K located at a radius of 157 AU. There may be a second disk orbiting between 7 and 30 AU with a temperature of 300±100. The Poynting–Robertson lifetime of the dust grains in this inner belt is around 46,000 years − much less than the age of the star. Hence the grains are being replenished, presumably through collisions between larger objects. Circumstellar gas is visible in ultraviolet images from the FUSE satellite, which is likely being emitted by the circumstellar matter then driven outward by the star's radiation.

The secondary, component B, has a magnitude of 7.70 and is an A-type main-sequence star. It has around 1.5 times the mass of the Sun and 7.4 times the Sun's luminosity.
