= Q Herculis =

Star in the Hercules constellation

q Herculis
Observation data Epoch J2000.0 Equinox ICRS
- Constellation: Hercules
- Right ascension: 16^{h} 11^{m} 28.74^{s}
- Declination: +16° 39′ 56.5″
- Apparent magnitude (V): 6.08

Characteristics
- Evolutionary stage: main sequence
- Spectral type: A0V
- U−B color index: 0.00
- B−V color index: 0.02

Astrometry
Proper motion (μ)	RA: +3,552 mas/yr Dec.: +4.875 mas/yr
Parallax (π)	8.6995±0.0353 mas
Distance	375 ± 2 ly (114.9 ± 0.5 pc)
Absolute magnitude (M_{V})	+0.63

Details
Mass	2.4 M_{☉}
Radius	2.6 R_{☉}
Luminosity	50 L_{☉}
Surface gravity (log g)	4.00 cgs
Temperature	9,567 K
Rotational velocity (v sin i)	43 km/s
Age	380 Myr

Other designations
- q Her, 48 Serpentis, BD+17 2982, HD 145647, HR 6035, SAO 101994

Database references
SIMBAD	data

q Herculis (48 Serpentis) is a star in the constellation Hercules that is situated at a distance of approximately 439.95 light-years from the Sun. Its apparent magnitude is +6.08.

The largest star q Herculis is a white star of the spectral type A0V. It has a mass of approximately 2.4 M_{☉}, a radius of approximately 2.6 R_{☉}, and a luminosity of approximately 50 L_{☉}. Its effective temperature is approximately 9,567 K. The age of q Herculis is determined to be about 380 million years.

== Nomenclature ==
q Herculis is this double star's Bayer designation. It was once considered to be in the constellation of Serpens, where it got its Flamsteed designation 48 Serpentis.
