= 104 Herculis =

Star in the constellation Hercules

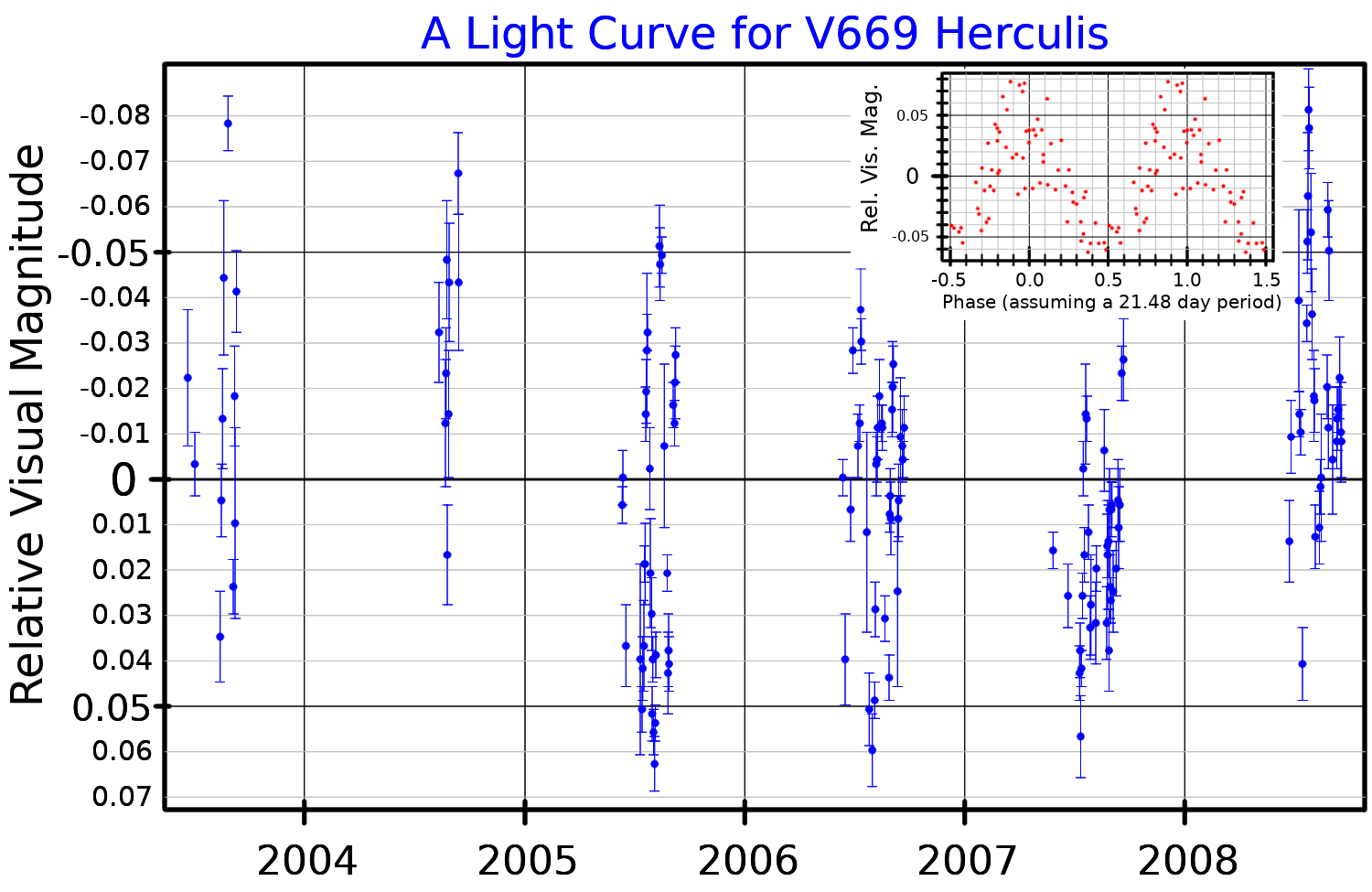
- A visual band light curve for V669 Herculis. The main plot shows the long-term variation (plotted from data published by Tabur et al.) and the inset plot shows the short-term periodic variation (adapted from Adelman and William).

Observation data Epoch J2000 Equinox ICRS
- Constellation: Hercules
- Right ascension: 18^{h} 11^{m} 54.15649^{s}
- Declination: +31° 24′ 19.2469″
- Apparent magnitude (V): 4.96

Characteristics
- Evolutionary stage: AGB
- Spectral type: M3 III
- B−V color index: 1.643±0.004
- Variable type: semiregular

Astrometry
Radial velocity (R_{v})	−1.19±0.29 km/s
Proper motion (μ)	RA: −15.172 mas/yr Dec.: +25.084 mas/yr
Parallax (π)	5.8167±0.1769 mas
Distance	560 ± 20 ly (172 ± 5 pc)
Absolute magnitude (M_{V})	−1.15

Details
Radius	85.80+6.65 −10.88 R_{☉}
Luminosity	1,202.3±42.1 L_{☉}
Surface gravity (log g)	0.99±0.29 cgs
Temperature	3,535±24 K
Metallicity [Fe/H]	−0.08±0.10 dex

Other designations
- A Her, 104 Her, V669 Her, AAVSO 1808+31B, BD+31°3199, FK5 3448, HD 167006, HIP 89172, HR 6815, SAO 66737

Database references
SIMBAD	data

104 Herculis is a solitary variable star located around 560 light years away from the Sun in the northern constellation of Hercules. It has the variable star designation V669 Herculis and the Bayer designation A Herculis, while 104 Herculis is the Flamsteed designation. This object is visible to the naked eye as a dim, red-hued point of light with a baseline apparent visual magnitude of 4.96. It is moving closer to the Earth with a heliocentric radial velocity of −1.2 km/s.

The variability of the brightness of 104 Herculis was announced by Joel Stebbins and Charles Morse Huffer in 1928, based on observations made at Washburn Observatory. It was given its variable star designation in 1977.

This is an aging red giant star on the asymptotic giant branch with a stellar classification of M3 III. It is a semiregular variable with an amplitude of 0.14 in the B-band and pulsation periods of 22.9 and 24.0 days. Having exhausted the hydrogen at its core, the star has expanded to 86 times the Sun's radius. It is radiating 1,202 times the Sun's luminosity from its swollen photosphere at an effective temperature of 3,535 K.
