= 32 Ophiuchi =

Star in the constellation Hercules

Observation data Epoch J2000 Equinox ICRS
- Constellation: Hercules
- Right ascension: 17^{h} 03^{m} 07.87110^{s}
- Declination: +14° 05′ 31.0140″
- Apparent magnitude (V): 4.97

Characteristics
- Evolutionary stage: asymptotic giant branch
- Spectral type: M3−III
- B−V color index: 1.600±0.007
- Variable type: suspected

Astrometry
Radial velocity (R_{v})	+43.15±0.15 km/s
Proper motion (μ)	RA: +25.226 mas/yr Dec.: −62.651 mas/yr
Parallax (π)	8.0197±0.1498 mas
Distance	407 ± 8 ly (125 ± 2 pc)
Absolute magnitude (M_{V})	−0.44

Details
Mass	1.60+1.38 −0.75 M_{☉}
Radius	63.6±1.2 R_{☉}
Luminosity	1,148+111 −193 L_{☉}
Surface gravity (log g)	1.90 cgs
Temperature	3,728±122 K
Metallicity [Fe/H]	−0.07 dex

Other designations
- 32 Oph, NSV 8142, BD+14°3179, HD 154143, HIP 83430, HR 6337, SAO 102553

Database references
SIMBAD	data

32 Ophiuchi is a single star located about 407 light years away from the Sun in the constellation Hercules. It is moving further away from the Sun with a heliocentric radial velocity of +43 km/s. and is visible to the naked eye as a dim, red-hued star with an apparent visual magnitude of 4.97.

This is an aging red giant star on the asymptotic giant branch with a stellar classification of M3−III. Having exhausted the supply of hydrogen at its core it has expanded to 63 times the radius of the Sun. The star is radiating over a thounsand times the luminosity of the Sun from its swollen photosphere at an effective temperature of around 3,728 K.

32 Ophiuchi is a suspected variable star with a brightness range of about 0.1 magnitudes.
