= 60 Herculis =

White-hued star in the constellation Hercules

- Location of 60 Herculis (circled in red)

Observation data Epoch J2000 Equinox ICRS
- Constellation: Hercules
- Right ascension: 17^{h} 05^{m} 22.69066^{s}
- Declination: +12° 44′ 26.9816″
- Apparent magnitude (V): 4.871

Characteristics
- Evolutionary stage: main sequence
- Spectral type: A3V or A4IV
- U−B color index: +0.12
- B−V color index: +0.125±0.006

Astrometry
Radial velocity (R_{v})	−4.2±2 km/s
Proper motion (μ)	RA: +49.805 mas/yr Dec.: −12.030 mas/yr
Parallax (π)	24.3967±0.2232 mas
Distance	134 ± 1 ly (41.0 ± 0.4 pc)
Absolute magnitude (M_{V})	1.83

Details
Mass	2.04±0.31 M_{☉}
Radius	1.89 R_{☉}
Luminosity	15.2 L_{☉}
Surface gravity (log g)	4.20 cgs
Temperature	8,299 K
Rotational velocity (v sin i)	117 km/s
Age	327 Myr

Other designations
- 60 Her, BD+12°3142, FK5 635, HD 154494, HIP 83613, HR 6355, SAO 102584

Database references
SIMBAD	data

60 Herculis is a single star located 134 light years away from the Sun in the northern constellation of Hercules, and is positioned just seven degrees away from Rasalgethi (Alpha Herculis). It is visible to the naked eye as a faint, white-hued star with an apparent visual magnitude of 4.871. This star is moving closer to the Earth with a heliocentric radial velocity of −4 km/s.

Abt and Morrell (1995) assigned this star a stellar classification of A3V, matching an ordinary A-type main-sequence star. However, earlier studies gave it a luminosity class of IV, which suggested it is a subdwarf star. It has a projected rotational velocity of 117 km/s, which is creating an equatorial bulge that is 5% larger than the star's polar radius. The star is 327 million years old with 2.0 times the Sun's mass. It is radiating 15 times the luminosity of the Sun from its photosphere at an effective temperature of 8,299 K.
