= 8 Herculis =

Star in the constellation Hercules

- Location of 8 Herculis (circled in red)

Observation data Epoch J2000.0 Equinox J2000.0
- Constellation: Hercules
- Right ascension: 16^{h} 08^{m} 46.6312^{s}
- Declination: +17° 12′ 20.292″
- Apparent magnitude (V): +6.13

Characteristics
- Evolutionary stage: main sequence
- Spectral type: A0Vnn
- B−V color index: −0.003±0.005

Astrometry
Radial velocity (R_{v})	−17.0±4.3 km/s
Proper motion (μ)	RA: −18.098(35) mas/yr Dec.: −31.408(43) mas/yr
Parallax (π)	8.1684±0.0430 mas
Distance	399 ± 2 ly (122.4 ± 0.6 pc)
Absolute magnitude (M_{V})	+1.18

Details
Mass	2.52 M_{☉}
Radius	2.54 R_{☉}
Luminosity	55 L_{☉}
Surface gravity (log g)	4.03 cgs
Temperature	9,863 K
Metallicity [Fe/H]	+0.10 dex
Rotational velocity (v sin i)	259 km/s
Age	317 Myr

Other designations
- 8 Her, BD+17°2967, HD 145122, HIP 79102, SAO 101962

Database references
SIMBAD	data

8 Herculis or 8 Her is an A-type main-sequence star 399 light-years (122.4 parsecs) away in the constellation Hercules. It is also known as HD 145122. Because of its apparent magnitude, of 6.13 the star can be very faintly seen with the naked eye in excellent conditions.

== Stellar properties ==
8 Herculis is a main-sequence star of spectral type A0Vnn. The nn indicates extremely nebulous spectral lines due to its rapid rotation. The star has about 2.5 times the mass, 2.5 times the radius, and 55 times the luminosity of the Sun. The star appears to have a similar metallicity to the Sun. At 317 million years old, it is modelled to be about 40% of the way through its main sequence life.
