= Nu Herculis =

Variable star in the constellation Hercules

- Location of ν Herculis (circled in red)

Observation data Epoch J2000 Equinox ICRS
- Constellation: Hercules
- Right ascension: 17^{h} 58^{m} 30.14909^{s}
- Declination: +30° 11′ 21.3870″
- Apparent magnitude (V): 4.38 - 4.48

Characteristics
- Spectral type: F2II (kA9hF2mF2(IV) + B9.5)
- U−B color index: +0.13
- B−V color index: +0.35
- Variable type: SRd?

Astrometry
Radial velocity (R_{v})	-22.30 ± 0.6 km/s
Proper motion (μ)	RA: -0.81 mas/yr Dec.: 2.18 mas/yr
Parallax (π)	3.79±0.39 mas
Distance	approx. 860 ly (approx. 260 pc)
Absolute magnitude (M_{V})	−2.67

Details
Mass	5.31 M_{☉}
Luminosity	799 L_{☉}
Surface gravity (log g)	2.29 cgs
Temperature	6410 K
Metallicity [Fe/H]	−0.33 dex
Rotational velocity (v sin i)	28.0 km/s
Age	200 Myr

Other designations
- ν Her, BD+30°3093, HD 164136, HIP 87998, HR 6707, SAO 66524

Database references
SIMBAD	data

Nu Herculis, Latinized from ν Herculis, is a binary and variable star in the constellation of Hercules. With an apparent magnitude of about 4.4, it is faintly visible to the naked eye. Parallax measurements made by the Hipparcos spacecraft put it at a distance of about 860 light years (260 parsecs).

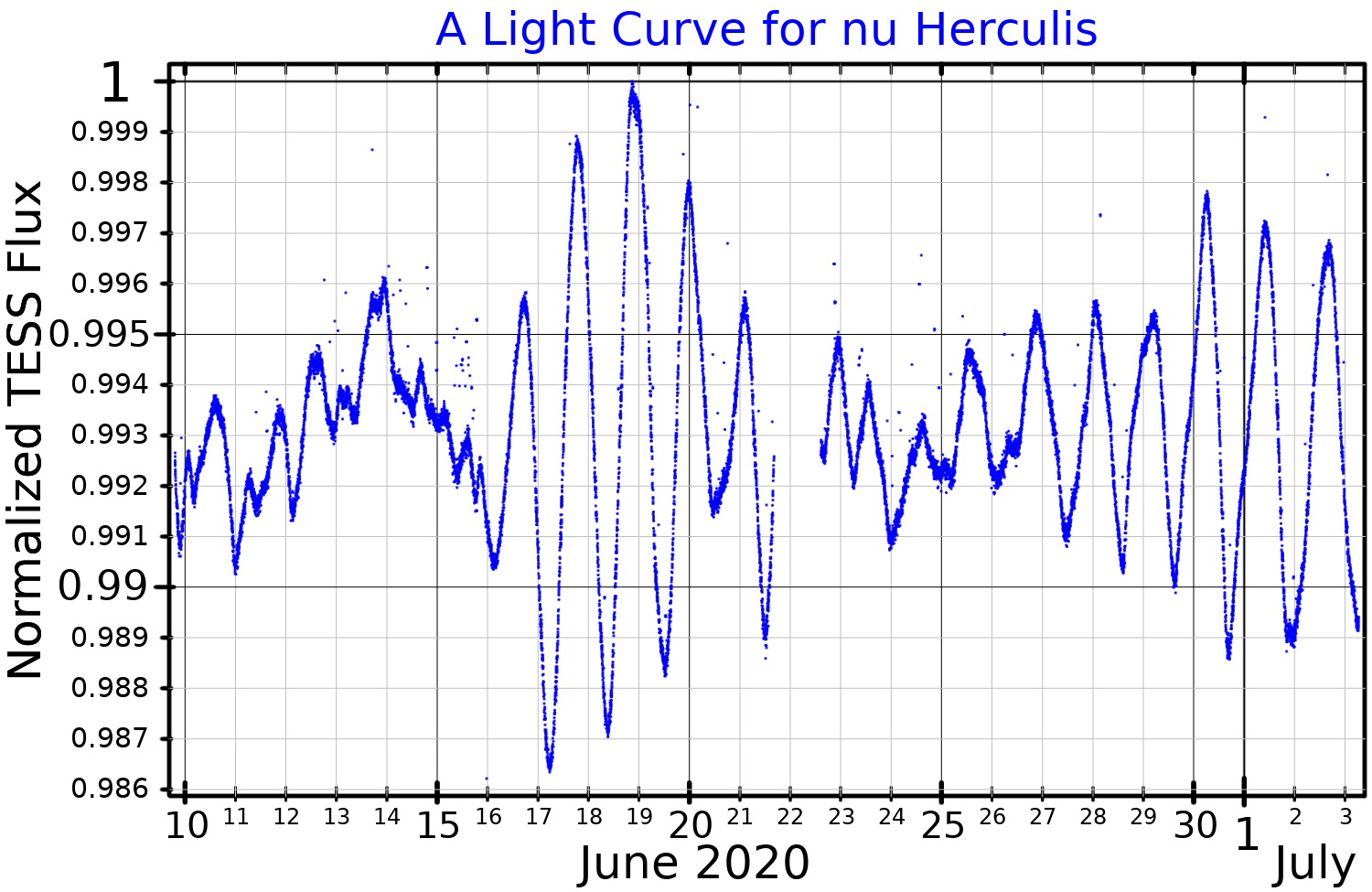
A light curve for Nu Herculis plotted from TESS data

This is a binary system with the two components separated by 0.446″. The secondary is nearly three magnitudes fainter than the primary at magnitude 7.5, and is hotter than the primary with a spectral type of B9.5.

Nu Herculis's spectral type of F2 II means that it is an F-type bright giant, with a luminosity 799 times that of the Sun. Its effective temperature is 6,410 K, hotter than the Sun. Its mass is about 5.3 solar masses. It is a possible semiregular variable star with a range of about a tenth of a magnitude. A period of 29 days has been derived.
