= Upsilon Herculis =

Star in the constellation Hercules

- Location of υ Herculis (circled in red)

Observation data Epoch J2000.0 Equinox J2000.0 (ICRS)
- Constellation: Hercules
- Right ascension: 16^{h} 02^{m} 47.89764^{s}
- Declination: +46° 02′ 12.1371″
- Apparent magnitude (V): 4.74

Characteristics
- Spectral type: B9 III
- U−B color index: −0.32
- B−V color index: −0.11

Astrometry
Radial velocity (R_{v})	+4.1±0.5 km/s
Proper motion (μ)	RA: +55.42 mas/yr Dec.: −61.29 mas/yr
Parallax (π)	8.78±0.18 mas
Distance	371 ± 8 ly (114 ± 2 pc)
Absolute magnitude (M_{V})	0.32

Details
Radius	4.0 R_{☉}
Luminosity	173 L_{☉}
Surface gravity (log g)	3.80 cgs
Temperature	10,152 K
Metallicity [Fe/H]	−0.30 dex
Rotational velocity (v sin i)	7.5 km/s
Age	254 Myr

Other designations
- υ Her, 6 Her, BD+46°2142, HD 144206, HIP 78592, HR 5982, SAO 45865

Database references
SIMBAD	data

Upsilon Herculis (υ Her) is a solitary star in the constellation Hercules. It is visible to the naked eye with an apparent visual magnitude of 4.74. Based upon an annual parallax shift of 8.78 mas as seen from Earth, it is located around 371 light years from the Sun. At that distance, the visual magnitude is diminished by an extinction factor of 0.09 due to interstellar dust.

At an estimated age of 254 million years, this appears to be an evolved B-type giant star with a stellar classification of B9 III. It is a mercury-manganese chemically peculiar star, indicating the spectrum shows abnormal abundances of these elements. The star has about four times the radius of the Sun and it radiates 173 times the Sun's luminosity from its photosphere at an effective temperature of 10,152 K.
