= 99 Herculis =

Star in the constellation Hercules

- Location of 99 Herculis (circled in red)

Observation data Epoch J2000 Equinox ICRS
- Constellation: Hercules
- Right ascension: 18^{h} 07^{m} 01.53971^{s}
- Declination: +30° 33′ 43.6896″
- Apparent magnitude (V): 5.066 (A: 5.10; B: 8.45)

Characteristics
- Spectral type: F7 V + K4 V
- U−B color index: –0.056
- B−V color index: +0.548

Astrometry
| Radial velocity (R_{v}) | +1.7 km/s |
| Proper motion (μ) | RA: −100.32 mas/yr Dec.: +110.08 mas/yr |
| Parallax (π) | 63.93±0.34 mas |
| Distance | 51.0 ± 0.3 ly (15.64 ± 0.08 pc) |
| Absolute magnitude (M_{V}) | 4.08 |

Orbit
| Period (P) | 56.3±0.1 yr |
| Semi-major axis (a) | 1.06±0.02″ |
| Eccentricity (e) | 0.766±0.004 |
| Inclination (i) | 39±2° |
| Longitude of the node (Ω) | 41±2° |
| Periastron epoch (T) | 1997.62±0.05 |
| Argument of periastron (ω) (secondary) | 116±2° |

Details

99 Her A
| Mass | 1.14 M_{☉} |
| Radius | 1.34 R_{☉} |
| Luminosity | 1.90 L_{☉} |
| Surface gravity (log g) | 4.17 cgs |
| Temperature | 5,908 K |
| Metallicity [Fe/H] | –0.60 dex |
| Rotational velocity (v sin i) | 5 km/s |
| Age | 9.37 Gyr |

99 Her B
| Mass | 0.46 M_{☉} |
| Radius | 0.67 R_{☉} |
| Luminosity | 0.19 L_{☉} |
| Temperature | 4,449 K |

Other designations
- b Her, 99 Her, BD+30°3128, GJ 704, HD 165908, HIP 88745, HR 6775, SAO 66648

Database references
| SIMBAD | A |
- B

99 Herculis is the Flamsteed designation for a binary star system in the northern constellation of Hercules. It has the Bayer designation b Herculis, while 99 Herculis is the Flamsteed designation. This system has an apparent visual magnitude of 5.1, which, according to the Bortle scale, makes it faintly visible to the naked eye from suburban skies. Measurements made with the Hipparcos spacecraft show an annual parallax shift of 0.064″, corresponding to a physical distance of about 51.0 ly (15.6 pc) from the Sun. The system is moving further from the Earth with a heliocentric radial velocity of +1.7 km/s.

The binary nature of this star system was first discovered in 1859 by English astronomer W. R. Dawes. The two stellar components orbit around their common center of mass, or barycenter, with a period of 56.3 years and an eccentricity of 0.766. The semi-major axis of their orbit spans an angle of 1.06 arcseconds, which corresponds to a physical dimension of 16.5 AU. The plane of their orbit is inclined by an angle of about 39° to the line-of-sight from the Earth. Reports of a third component of this system now appear doubtful.

== System ==
The primary component, 99 Herculis A, is an F-type main sequence star with a stellar classification of F7 V. It is 13% more mass than the Sun and nearly double the luminosity, but has an estimated 34% greater radius. The effective temperature of the star's outer atmosphere is 5,908 K, giving it a white-hued glow. This is a metal-poor star, showing overall abundances of elements—other than hydrogen or helium—equal to 60% of those in the Sun.

The secondary component, 99 Herculis B, is fainter by 3.35 magnitudes compared to the primary. It is a K-type main sequence star with a classification of K4 V. With 46% of the mass of the Sun, it is 67% of the radius of the Sun but shines with just 19% of the Sun's luminosity.

=== Debris disk ===
Images from the Herschel Space Observatory show that a narrow disk of dusty debris is orbiting the barycenter at an average radius of 120 AU. Oddly, the disk appears to be misaligned with the orbital plane of the binary system and is instead aligned with the poles. This may be the result of an interaction within another star system some time in the past. Most of the disk emission appears to be caused by icy objects having a diameter of 10 cm or less, with a net mass of about ten times the mass of the Earth.

It is hypothesized that the debris disk is being sculpted by several (likely two) polar circumbinary planets due to the disk being truncated in some regions. Simulations of this system that only have a single planet are insufficient to explain the morphology of the disk as that planet only truncates one edge of the disk leaving the other edge extended. Simulation that have two planets successfully model what is seen in the debris disk of 99 Herculis as they can carve out the disk on both edges leaving a narrow debris disk.
