= HD 165590 =

Triple star system in constellation Hercules

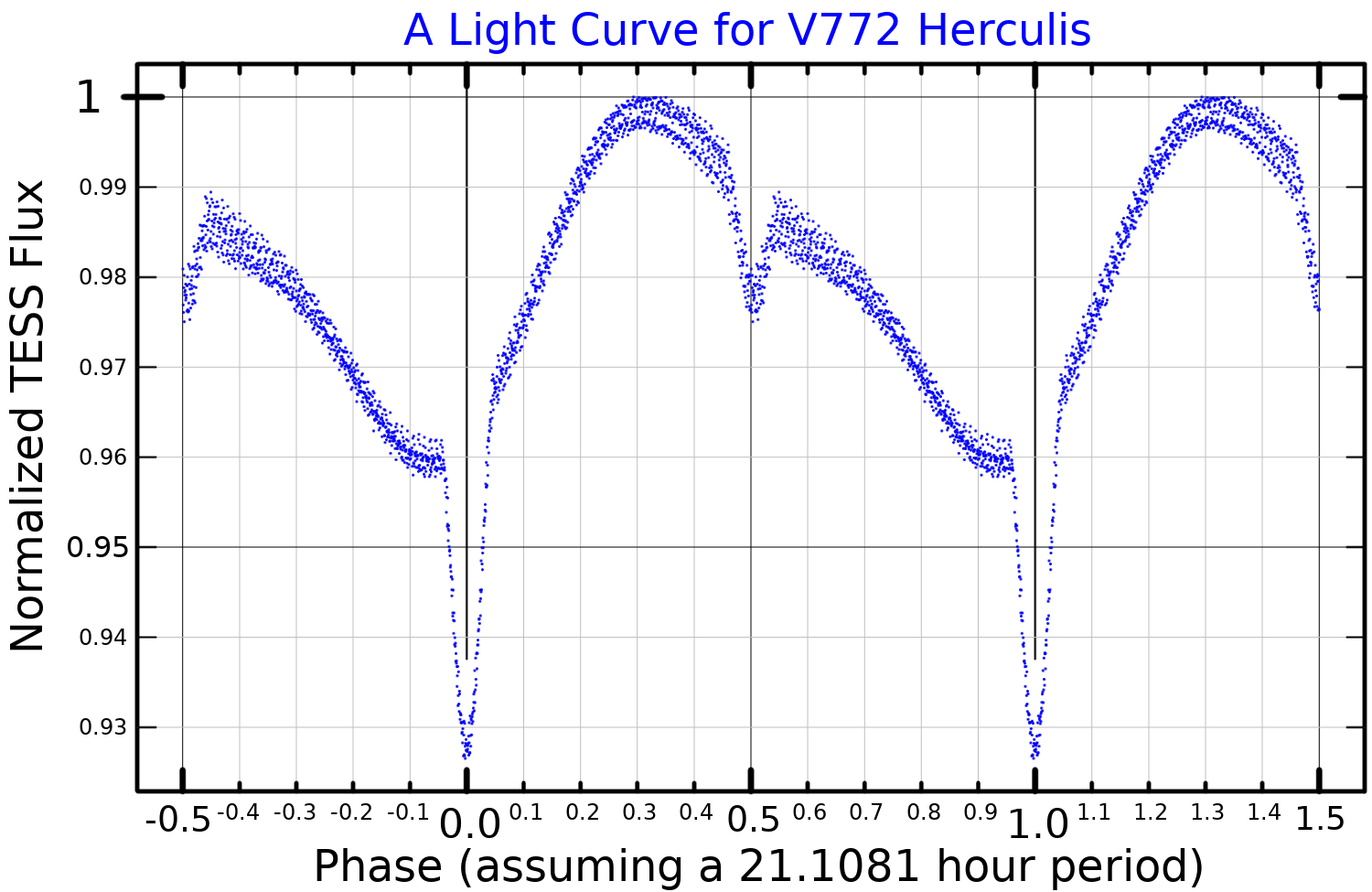
- A light curve for V772 Herculis, plotted from TESS data

Observation data Epoch J2000 Equinox ICRS
- Constellation: Hercules
- AB
- Right ascension: 18^{h} 05^{m} 49.682^{s}
- Declination: +21° 26′ 45.39″
- Apparent magnitude (V): 6.94

Characteristics

HD 165590 A
- Evolutionary stage: main sequence
- Spectral type: G1V+K6V

HD 165590 B
- Evolutionary stage: main sequence
- Spectral type: G5V

HD 165590 C
- Evolutionary stage: main sequence
- Spectral type: K7V+M0V

Astrometry

ADS 11060 AB
Proper motion (μ)	RA: −3.9±0.5 mas/yr Dec.: −51.4±0.7 mas/yr
Parallax (π)	26.51±1.35 mas
Distance	123 ± 6 ly (38 ± 2 pc)

ADS 11060 C
Proper motion (μ)	RA: −27.515±0.014 mas/yr Dec.: −39.93±0.02 mas/yr
Parallax (π)	24.6940±0.0225 mas
Distance	132.1 ± 0.1 ly (40.50 ± 0.04 pc)

Orbit
Primary	Aa
Name	Ab
Period (P)	0.8795 d
Semi-major axis (a)	0.557 mas
Eccentricity (e)	0.050
Periastron epoch (T)	41032.238
Argument of periastron (ω) (secondary)	104.0°
Semi-amplitude (K_{1}) (primary)	94.7 km/s

Orbit
Primary	A
Name	B
Period (P)	20.0810 yr
Semi-major axis (a)	0.253″
Eccentricity (e)	0.956
Inclination (i)	77.0°
Longitude of the node (Ω)	270.8°
Periastron epoch (T)	1978.438
Argument of periastron (ω) (secondary)	3.0°

Orbit
Primary	AB
Name	C
Period (P)	18,303 yr
Semi-major axis (a)	28.216″

Orbit
Primary	Ca
Name	Cb
Period (P)	25.7361 d
Semi-major axis (a)	4.729 mas
Eccentricity (e)	0.565
Inclination (i)	77.0°

Details

HD 165590 Aa
Mass	1.09±0.19 M_{☉}
Radius	0.90 R_{☉}
Luminosity	1.33 L_{☉}
Surface gravity (log g)	4.56 cgs
Temperature	5,915 K
Metallicity [Fe/H]	−0.13 dex
Age	100 Myr

HD 165590 Ab
Mass	0.63±0.15 M_{☉}
Radius	0.58 R_{☉}
Surface gravity (log g)	4.71 cgs
Temperature	4,055 K

HD 165590 B
Mass	0.98 M_{☉}
Radius	0.91±0.09 R_{☉}
Temperature	5,590±300 K
Age	100 Myr

HD 165590 Ca
Mass	0.620 ± 0.083 M_{☉}
Radius	0.988 ± 0.103 R_{☉}
Luminosity	0.225 ± 0.018 L_{☉}
Surface gravity (log g)	4.240 ± 0.126 cgs
Temperature	4,001 ± 126 K

HD 165590 Cb
Mass	0.64 M_{☉}

Other designations
- ADS 11060, CSI+21 3302 1, GSC 01566-00747, HIP 88637, 2MASS J18054972+2126453, BD+21 3302, SBC9 1024, V772 Her, Gaia DR2 4576326312901654272
- HD 165590A: TYC 1566-747-1, SBC9 1023, CSI+21 3302 6, ADS 11060A
- HD 165590B: TYC 1566-747-2, CSI+21 3302 7, ADS 11060B

Database references
SIMBAD	data

HD 165590 is a quintuple system dominated by the binary Algol variable star known as V772 Herculis. The system lies in the constellation of Hercules about 123 light years from the Sun, and is suspected to be a part of the Pleiades moving group.

== System ==
The primary star is an eclipsing binary ADS 11060A composed of G1 and K6 young main-sequence stars with strong starspot activity. A radio flare from the star V772 Her was detected in 2011. The period of the components of the primary, ADS 11060Aa and ADS 11060Ab, is 0.87950 days.

A main-sequence companion star ADS 11060B of spectral type G5 at a separation of 0.491 arcseconds, is orbiting the primary with a period of 20.08 years.

Also, there is a suspected companion binary star ADS 11060C (Gaia EDR3 4576326312901650560) at a projected separation of 29 arcseconds (1200 AU) from ADS 11060AB. ADS 11060C is composed of K7 and M0 main-sequence stars, orbiting each other with a period of 25.7631 days without eclipses. The binary is a BY Draconis variable with the variable star designation V885 Herculis.

The planetary orbits in the habitable zones in the system ADS 11060AB are unstable due to the gravitational influence of the stellar companions.
