= NGC 6261 =

Galaxy in the constellation Hercules

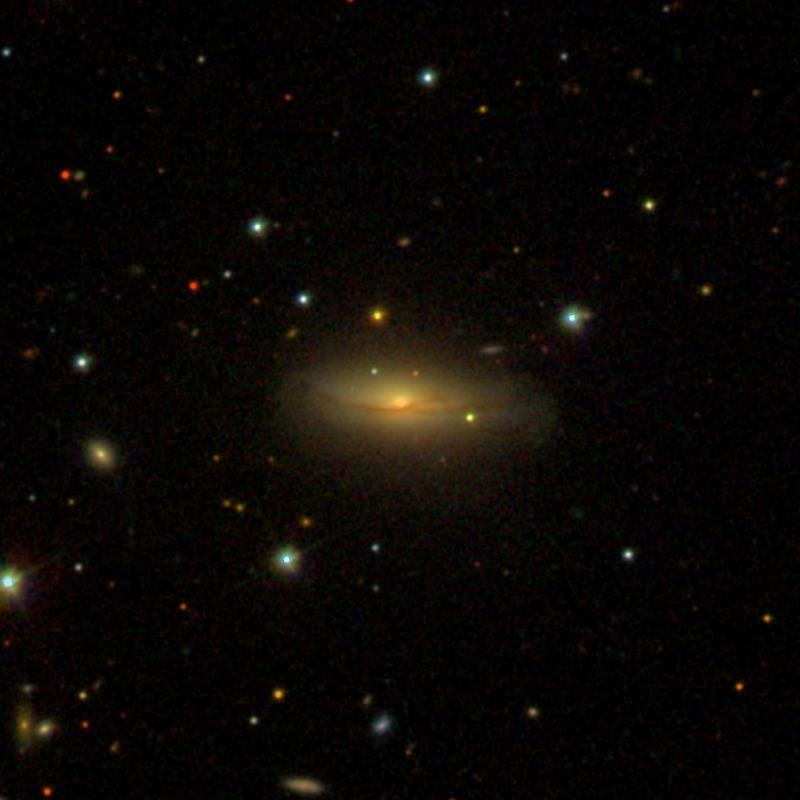
- NGC 6261 imaged by Sloan Digital Sky Survey

Observation data (J2000 epoch)
- Constellation: Hercules
- Right ascension: 16^{h} 56^{m} 30.526^{s}
- Declination: +27° 58′ 39.24″
- Redshift: 0.035184
- Heliocentric radial velocity: 10,601 km/s
- Distance: 471.4 Mly (144.53 Mpc)
- Apparent magnitude (V): 14.5
- Surface brightness: 28.5 mag/arcsec

Characteristics
- Type: S0/a
- Size: 200,000 ly

Other designations
- PGC 59286, UGC 10617, MCG +05-40-006, CGCG 169-013, 2MASX J16563054+2758392, SDSS J165630.51+275839.0, UZC J165630.6+275839, NSA 070084, NVSS J165630+275838, LEDA 59286

NGC 6261 is a lenticular galaxy in the constellation of Hercules. It is located 470 million light-years away from the Solar System and has an approximate diameter of 200,000 light-years.

NGC 6261 was discovered on July 13, 1880, by French astronomer Edouard Stephan. The galaxy is described as LINER according to SIMBAD database and presents emission spectrum in its nucleus which is categorized by broad lines of weak ionized atoms.

== Supernovae ==
Two supernovae have been discovered in NGC 6261: SN 2007hu and SN 2008dt.

- SN 2007hu was discovered on September 9, 2007, by astronomers Ernesto Guido, A. Sehgal and Tim Puckett. It had a magnitude of 17.7 and was located 1".3 west and 1".4 north of the nucleus. The supernova was Type la.
- SN 2008dt was discovered on 30 June 2008, by astronomers D. Madison, W. Li and A.V. Filippenko at the University of California, Berkeley. It had a magnitude of 17.2 and was located 1".0 east and 5.5" south of the nucleus. The supernova was Type la.

== See also ==
- List of NGC objects (6001–7000)
