= M92 =

M92 or M-92 may refer to:

- Messier 92, a globular cluster in the constellation Hercules
- M-92 (Michigan highway), a state highway in Michigan
- Beretta 92FS, a model of Beretta handgun
- Zastava M92, a shortened assault rifle based on the AK-47
- Gefechtshelm M92, a combat helmet of the German Bundeswehr
