= UGC 11105 =

Galaxy in the constellation Hercules

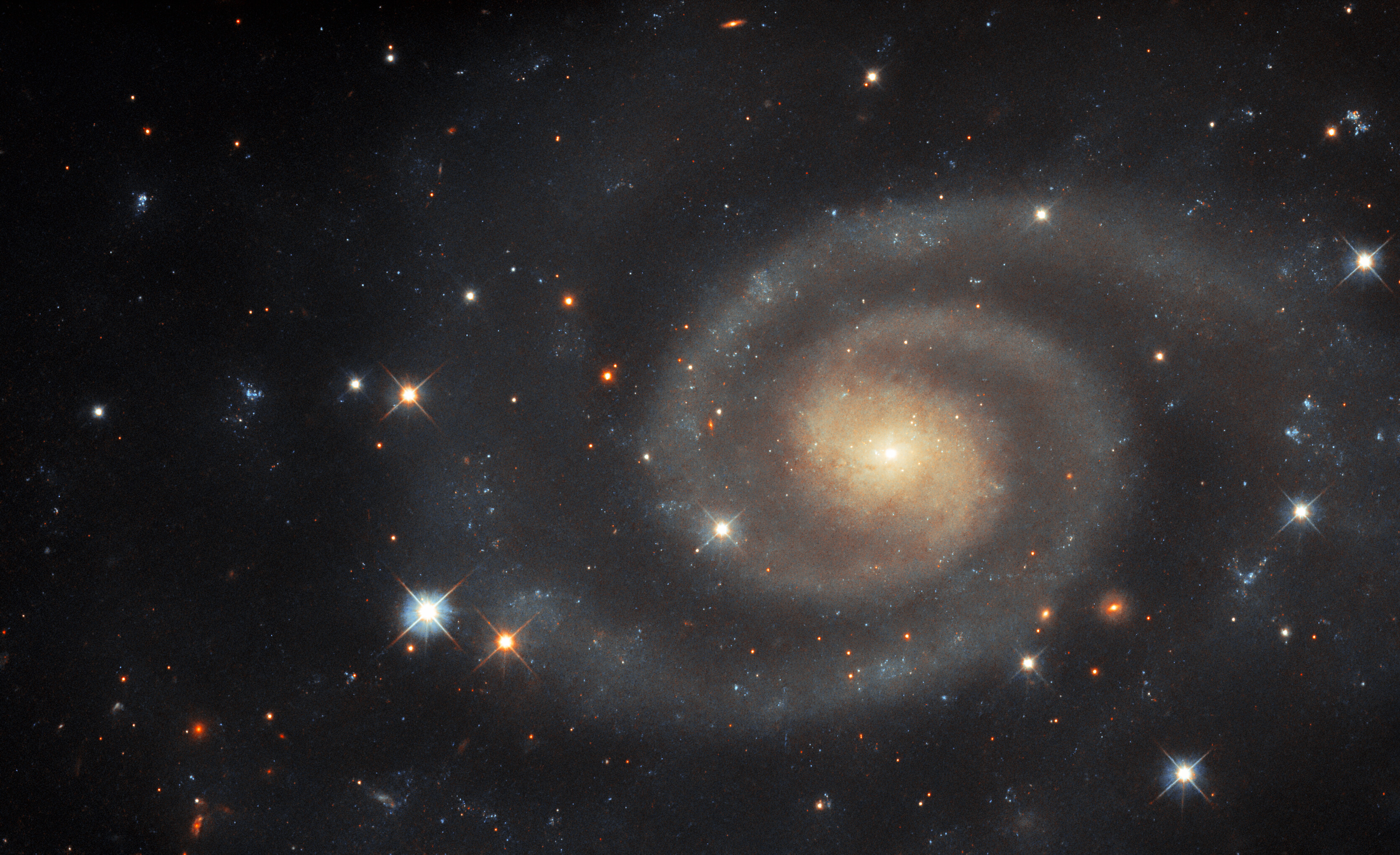
- Hubble Space Telescope image of UGC 11105

Observation data (J2000 epoch)
- Constellation: Hercules
- Right ascension: 18^{h} 04^{m} 36.08^{s}
- Declination: +21° 38′ 16.2″
- Redshift: 0.007418
- Heliocentric radial velocity: 2216 ± 4 km/s
- Distance: 109 Mly (33.4 Mpc)
- Apparent magnitude (B): 15.7

Characteristics
- Type: Sdm
- Size: ~81,100 ly (24.87 kpc) (estimated)

Other designations
- PGC 61361, UGC 11105, MCG +04-42-024, CGCG 141-047

UGC 11105, also known as PGC 61361, is a relatively nearby spiral galaxy located 109 million light-years (33.4 Mpc) away in the constellation Hercules. The galaxy is outshone by bright stars in the foreground. From the perspective on Earth, the Sun is 14 thousand trillion times brighter as compared to UGC 11105, if we to calculate the apparent magnitude for both objects. It is a possible active galactic nucleus candidate, according to SIMBAD.

== Supernova ==
One supernova has been observed in UGC 11105: SN 2019pjs (Type II, mag. 17.3) was discovered by the Lick Observatory Supernova Search (LOSS) on 4 September 2019.
