= 2MASX J16270254+4328340 =

Pair of galaxies

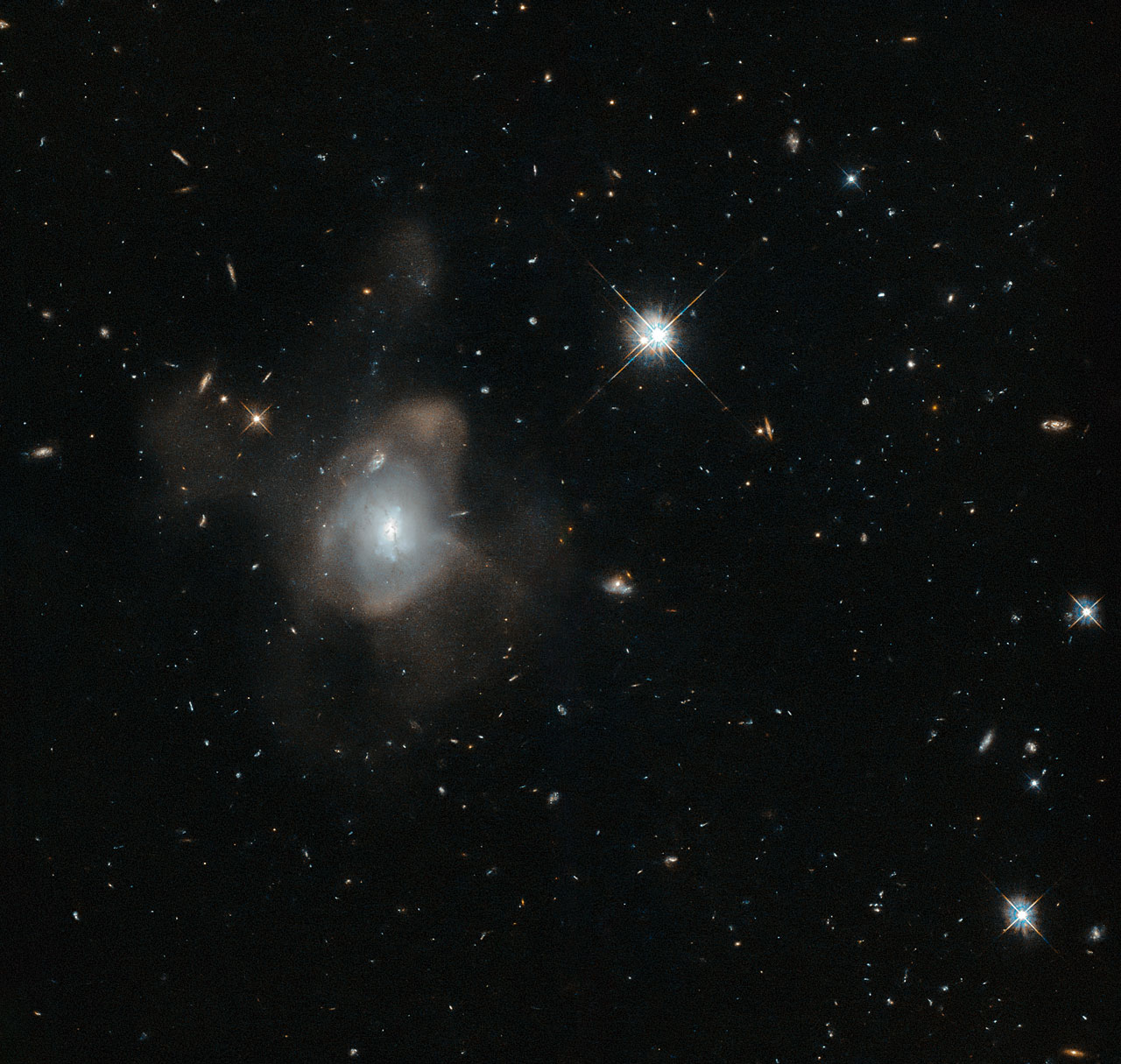

Observation data (J2000 epoch)
- Constellation: Hercules
- Right ascension: 16^{h} 27^{m} 02.556^{s}
- Declination: +43° 28′ 33.95″
- Redshift: 0.04623
- Distance: 500 million light years
- Apparent magnitude (V): 15.4

Characteristics
- Type: E
- Apparent size (V): 0.57 x 0.46
- Notable features: Long tails of millions of stars

Other designations
- SDSS J162702.56+432833.9, PGC 3087775

2MASX J16270254+4328340 (also known as SDSS J162702.56+432833.9 or PGC 3087775) is a pair of old, local universe merging/interacting elliptical galaxies that are located in the constellation of Hercules about 500 million light years away from Earth. The two galaxies have gravitationally thrown out millions of stars in long tails. The two galaxies are heading into their old age where star formation starts to stop and the galaxy starts to die.

The galaxy has a central blue region. This central blue region are the result of many young blue-white stars being formed as a result of the galactic merging event.
