= HD 155358 b =

Extrasolar gas giant planet

Discovery
- Discovered by: Cochran et al.
- Discovery site: University of Texas
- Discovery date: May 10, 2007
- Detection method: Radial velocity

Orbital characteristics
- Semi-major axis: 0.628 ± 0.02 AU (93,900,000 ± 3,000,000 km)
- Eccentricity: 0.112±0.037
- Orbital period (sidereal): 195±1.1 d
- Time of periastron: 2,453,950 ±10.4
- Argument of periastron: 162±20
- Semi-amplitude: 34.6±3
- Star: HD 155358

HD 155358 b is a gas giant planet that orbits the star HD 155358, located 142 light years away in the constellation Hercules. This planet orbits at a distance about 63% of distance between Earth and the Sun and has a moderate eccentricity. The planet mass is at least 89% of Jupiter, depending on inclination of the orbit and true mass of the star. It takes over half a year to orbit the star.

== See also ==
- HD 155358 c
