= HD 155358 c =

Extrasolar planet

Discovery
- Discovered by: Cochran et al.
- Discovery site: University of Texas
- Discovery date: May 10, 2007
- Detection method: Radial velocity

Orbital characteristics
- Semi-major axis: 1.224 ± 0.081 AU (183.1 ± 12.1 million km)
- Eccentricity: 0.176±0.174
- Orbital period (sidereal): 530.3±27.2 d
- Time of periastron: 2,454,420.3 ±79.3
- Argument of periastron: 279±38
- Semi-amplitude: 14.1±1.6
- Star: HD 155358

HD 155358 c is an extrasolar planet orbiting the star HD 155358 located 142 light-years away in the constellation Hercules. This is a gas giant which orbits at 1.224 AU and takes 530.3 days to orbit HD 155358. This planet orbits in an eccentric orbit. This planet has at least half the mass of Jupiter.

== See also ==
- HD 155358 b
