= G Herculis =

Star in the constellation Hercules

g Herculis
- Location of g Herculis (circled in red)

Observation data Epoch J2000 Equinox ICRS
- Constellation: Hercules
- Right ascension: 16^{h} 28^{m} 38.54859^{s}
- Declination: +41° 52′ 54.0406″
- Apparent magnitude (V): 4.3 - 6.3

Characteristics
- Evolutionary stage: AGB
- Spectral type: M6− III
- B−V color index: 1.289±0.024
- Variable type: SRb

Astrometry
Radial velocity (R_{v})	1.49±0.38 km/s
Proper motion (μ)	RA: +30.16 mas/yr Dec.: −5.14 mas/yr
Parallax (π)	9.21±0.18 mas
Distance	354 ± 7 ly (109 ± 2 pc)
Absolute magnitude (M_{V})	−0.41

Orbit
Period (P)	843.7±21.1 d
Eccentricity (e)	0.37±0.11
Periastron epoch (T)	2,451,918.2±43.9 HJD
Argument of periastron (ω) (secondary)	246±21°
Semi-amplitude (K_{1}) (primary)	2.3±0.3 km/s

Details

g Her A
Mass	1.65±0.30 M_{☉}
Radius	230 R_{☉}
Luminosity	5,395 L_{☉}
Surface gravity (log g)	0.20 cgs
Temperature	3,263±23 K
Metallicity [Fe/H]	−0.01 dex

Other designations
- g Her, 30 Her, BD+42°2714, FK5 3303, HD 148783, HIP 80704, HR 6146, SAO 46108

Database references
SIMBAD	data

g Herculis is a binary star system in the northern constellation of Hercules, which makes part of a wide triple star system. It has the Flamsteed designation 30 Herculis, while g Herculis is the Bayer designation. This system is visible to the naked eye as a faint, red-hued point of light. Based upon a measured parallax of 9.2 mas, it is located around 354 light years away from the Sun. The system is moving further from the Earth with a heliocentric radial velocity of 1.5 km/s.

== Characteristics ==
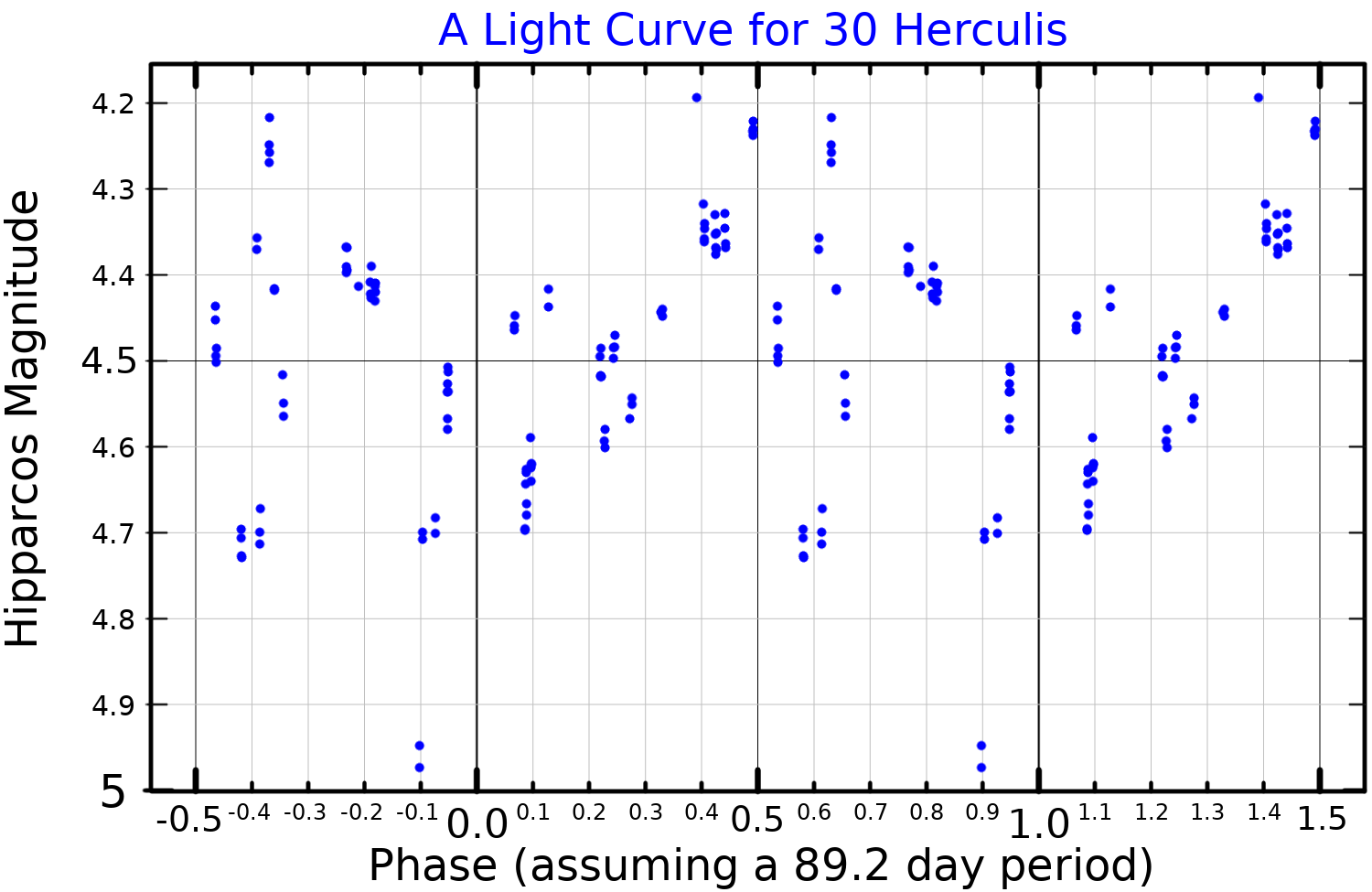
A light curve for g Herculis, plotted from Hipparcos data

This is a single-lined spectroscopic binary with an orbital period of 2.310 years and an eccentricity of 0.37. The visible component is an aging red giant on the asymptotic giant branch with a stellar classification of M6− III. According to Samus et al. (2017), it is a semiregular variable of subtype SRb, which ranges between visual magnitudes 4.3 and 6.3 over 89.2 days. It displays cyclical periods of 62.3, 89.5, and 888.9 days. The star is surrounded by a circumstellar dust shell that seems primarily composed of oxides of iron, magnesium, and aluminium, rather than silicates.

In addition to the spectroscopic pair, there is a much wider star sharing similar proper motion and distance. It is a so-called proper motion companion. This star has a projected separation of 1,060 astronomical units from the inner pair. Its mass is estimated at 0.4 solar masses, and its apparent magnitude is much fainter than that of g Herculis.
