= Abell 39 =

Nebula in the constellation Hercules

Abell 039
Emission nebula
- Planetary nebula
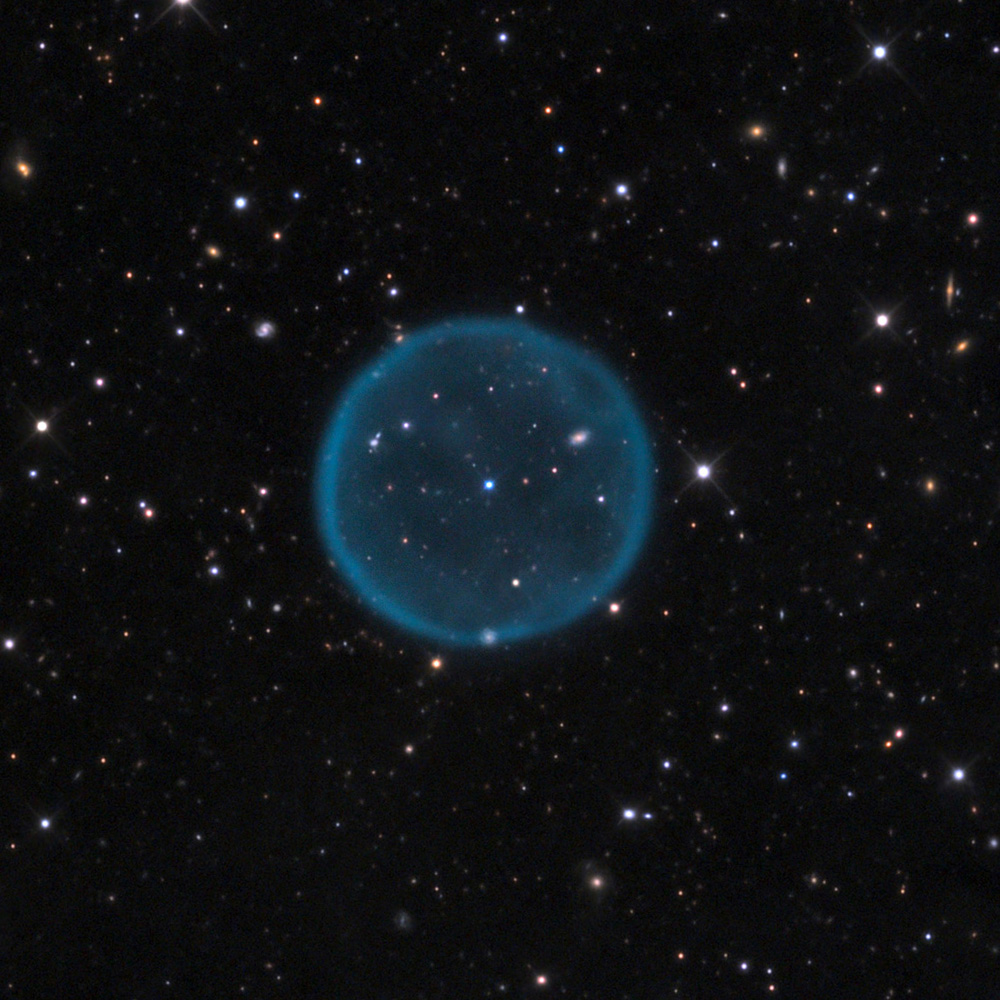
- Credit: [Adam Block/Mount Lemmon SkyCenter/University of Arizona]

Observation data: J2000 epoch
- Right ascension: 16^{h} 27^{m} 33.720^{s}
- Declination: +27° 54′ 33.47″
- Distance: 3800 ly
- Apparent magnitude (V): Integrated: 13.7; Central Star: 15.5 ± 0.2
- Apparent dimensions (V): 155.1″ × 154.5″
- Constellation: Hercules

Physical characteristics
- Radius: 1.4 ly
- Notable features: Almost perfectly spherical
- Designations: PN A66 39, PN ARO 180, PK 047+42 1

Abell 39 (PN A66 39) is a low surface brightness planetary nebula in the constellation of Hercules. It is the 39th entry in George Abell's 1966 Abell Catalog of Planetary Nebulae (and 27th in his 1955 catalog) of 86 old planetary nebulae which either Abell or Albert George Wilson discovered before August 1955 as part of the National Geographic Society – Palomar Observatory Sky Survey. It is estimated to be about 3,800 light-years from earth and thus 2,600 light-years above the Galactic plane. It is almost perfectly spherical and also one of the largest known spheres with a radius of about 1.4 light-years.

== Central star ==
Its central star is slightly west of center by about 2″ or 0.1 light-years. This offset does not appear to be due to interaction with the interstellar medium, but instead, it is hypothesized that a small asymmetric mass ejection has accelerated the central star. The mass of the central star is estimated to be about 0.61 M_{☉} with the material in the planetary nebula comprising an additional 0.6 M_{☉}.

This planetary nebula has a nearly uniform spherical shell. However, the eastern limb of the nebula is 50% more luminous than the western limb. Additionally, irregularities in the surface brightness are seen across the face of the shell. The source of the east–west asymmetry is not known but it could be related to the offset of the central star.

The central star is classified as a subdwarf O star with surface temperature of 8900 K.

== Structure and composition ==
The bright rim of the planetary nebula has an average thickness of about 10.1″, or an absolute size of about 0.19 light-years. There is a faint halo that extends about 18″ beyond the bright rim giving a complete diameter of around 190″ under the assumption that this emission is uniform around the planetary nebula.

This planetary nebula has been expanding for an estimated 11,000 years, based on an assumed expansion velocity between 32 and 37 km/s and a 0.4 parsec radius.

Background galaxies are visible near the nebula, and some can be seen through it.

Oxygen is only about half as abundant in the nebula as it is in our own sun.
