= Rho Herculis =

Binary star in the constellation Hercules

- Location of ρ Herculis (circled in red)

Observation data Epoch J2000 Equinox ICRS
- Constellation: Hercules
- ρ Her A
- Right ascension: 17^{h} 23^{m} 40.972^{s}
- Declination: +37° 08′ 45.33″
- Apparent magnitude (V): 4.510
- ρ Her B
- Right ascension: 17^{h} 23^{m} 40.718^{s}
- Declination: +37° 08′ 48.44″
- Apparent magnitude (V): 5.398

Characteristics

ρ Her A
- Spectral type: A0IIIpHgMn
- U−B color index: −0.06
- B−V color index: +0.00

ρ Her B
- Spectral type: B9.5IVn

Astrometry

ρ Her A
Radial velocity (R_{v})	−21.0 ± 2 km/s
Proper motion (μ)	RA: −38.6 mas/yr Dec.: 9.2 mas/yr
Parallax (π)	8.3380±0.3358 mas
Distance	390 ± 20 ly (120 ± 5 pc)

ρ Her B
Radial velocity (R_{v})	−19.3 ± 2 km/s
Proper motion (μ)	RA: −38.6 mas/yr Dec.: 9.2 mas/yr
Parallax (π)	9.0354±0.1135 mas
Distance	361 ± 5 ly (111 ± 1 pc)

Details

A
Mass	4.00/2.93 M_{☉}
Temperature	9,118 K
Metallicity [Fe/H]	0.0 dex
Rotational velocity (v sin i)	75 km/s

B
Mass	3.27 M_{☉}
Surface gravity (log g)	3.6 cgs
Temperature	8,755 K
Rotational velocity (v sin i)	291 km/s

Other designations
- BD+37°2878, HIP 85112, ADS 10526 AB, CCDM J17236+3708AB
- ρ Her A: HD 157779, HR 6485, SAO 66001
- ρ Her B: HD 157778, HR 6484, SAO 66000

Database references
SIMBAD	ρ Her
- ρ Her A
- ρ Her B

Rho Herculis (ρ Her, ρ Herculis) is a double star in the constellation of Hercules. The apparent magnitudes of the components are 4.510 and 5.398, respectively. Parallax measurements published in Gaia Data Release 2 put the system at some 360-390 light-years (111-121 parsecs) away.

The two stars of Rho Herculis are separated by four arcseconds, and are known as Rho Herculis A and B, respectively. A is an A-type giant star, while B is a B-type subgiant star. They are also referred to, rarely, as Rho^{1} Herculis and Rho^{2} Herculis. Rho Herculis A is itself a close binary which has been resolved using speckle interferometry, with the two components separated by 0.252″.

The two visual components have very similar spectral types, between A0 and B9. Rho Herculis A is generally assigned a giant luminosity class, with Rho Herculis B most often considered to be a main sequence star. Rho Herculis A has been considered to be an Ap star, with unusually strong silicon or mercury and manganese absorption lines in its spectrum, but this is now considered to be dubious.
