= HD 156668 =

Star in the constellation Hercules

Observation data Epoch J2000.0 Equinox ICRS
- Constellation: Hercules
- Right ascension: 17^{h} 17^{m} 40.48961^{s}
- Declination: +29° 13′ 38.0184″
- Apparent magnitude (V): +8.424

Characteristics
- Evolutionary stage: main sequence
- Spectral type: K3 V
- B−V color index: 1.015

Astrometry
Radial velocity (R_{v})	−44.68±0.13 km/s
Proper motion (μ)	RA: −72.481 mas/yr Dec.: +216.849 mas/yr
Parallax (π)	41.1103±0.0169 mas
Distance	79.34 ± 0.03 ly (24.325 ± 0.010 pc)
Absolute magnitude (M_{V})	6.480

Details
Mass	0.772±0.020 M_{☉}
Radius	0.720±0.013 R_{☉}
Luminosity	0.230±0.018 L_{☉}
Surface gravity (log g)	4.60±0.12 cgs
Temperature	4,850±88 K
Metallicity [Fe/H]	+0.05±0.06 dex
Rotation	51.5 days
Rotational velocity (v sin i)	0.50±1.0 km/s
Age	8.6±4.8 Gyr

Other designations
- BD+29°2979, HD 156668, HIP 84607, SAO 84984, 2MASS J17174049+2913378

Database references
SIMBAD	data
Exoplanet Archive	data

HD 156668 is a star in the northern constellation of Hercules. With an apparent visual magnitude of 8.4 it is too faint to be viewed with the naked eye, but it can be seen with even a small telescope. The distance to this object has been determined directly using the parallax technique, yielding a value of 79.3 light-years (24.3 parsecs).

This star has the stellar classification of a K2 dwarf, with approximately 77% of the mass of the Sun and about 72% of the Sun's diameter. While they are on the main sequence, lower mass stars like this generate energy much more slowly than the Sun. As a result, this star is radiating only 23% of the Sun's bolometric luminosity. HD 156668 is emitting this energy from its outer atmosphere at an effective temperature of around 4850 K, giving it the cool orange glow of a K-type star. It is slightly more enriched in iron compared to the Sun and is rotating at a leisurely rate of once every 51.5 days. Although much older than the Sun, this star is only middle-aged at about 8.6 billion years.

HD 156668 exhibits a stellar activity cycle with a period about 10 years.

== Observations ==
From 1911 to 1915, Photographic Stellar Spectrum surveys were carried out by Annie Jump Cannon and Edward Charles Pickering. Anna Mary Palmer who was Henry Draper's wife financed the study, it was also her husband who was responsible for the star's designation in the Henry Draper Catalogue with subsequent extension (HD) although it was first designated as BD+29 2979 in the original catalogue that was published in 1863 by Friedrich Wilhelm Argelander due to its position and brightness of 324,198 stars between +90° and −2° declination in the span of an 11-year observation. A number of proper motion surveys was published in 1957 where 9,867 stars in the Southern hemisphere where high proper motion was detected. The name BD was taken from a catalogue of the Bonner Durchmusterung (Bonn Survey) where observations are abbreviated as BD. Latter study expansions were carried out by the Cape Photographic Durchmusterung observatory in Córdoba, Argentina and further extensions by Henry Lee Giclas who designated the star as G 181-34 in the Giclas catalogues. From 1990 to 1993, HD 156668 was observed at least twice and was featured at the 6th annual catalog of the Tokyo Photoelectric Meridian Circle (PMC) where it is one of 6649 stars observed.

== Planetary system ==
Andrew Howard announced the discovery of a Super-Earth in orbit around HD 156668. This planet is designated HD 156668 b. The announcement was made at the 215th American Astronomical Society meeting on January 4 to 7, 2010 in Washington D.C. The planet orbits its star in only 4.6 days with a distance approximately 0.05 AU away from the parent star. The researchers used the wobble method where the resulting spectrum showed color shifts which was used to approximate the mass of the astronomical object. The observation revealed data that the exoplanet was at least 4.15 Earth masses. Later observations revealed that the minimum mass is now 3.1 Earth masses.

Another planet, HD 156668 c, was discovered in 2021, and presence of additional long-period object is suspected.

The HD 156668 planetary system
Companion (in order from star)	Mass	Semimajor axis (AU)	Orbital period (days)	Eccentricity	Inclination (°)	Radius
b	≥3.1 ± 0.4 M_{🜨}	0.0211 ± 0.0002	1.26984 ± 0.00007	0.000	—	—
c	≥0.0991^{+0.0079}_{−0.0077} M_{J}	1.570±0.017	811.3^{+5.2}_{−5.3}	0.089^{+0.04}_{−0.061}	—	—
