= HD 154345 =

Star in the constellation Hercules

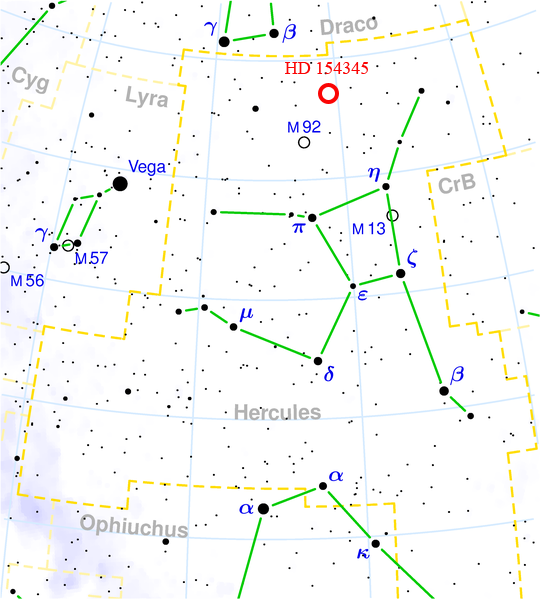
- Location of HD 154345 (circled in red)

Observation data Epoch J2000.0 Equinox ICRS
- Constellation: Hercules
- Right ascension: 17^{h} 02^{m} 36.40381^{s}
- Declination: +47° 04′ 54.7642″
- Apparent magnitude (V): +6.76

Characteristics
- Evolutionary stage: main sequence
- Spectral type: G8V
- U−B color index: 0.27
- B−V color index: 0.728±0.005

Astrometry
Radial velocity (R_{v})	−47.08±0.12 km/s
Proper motion (μ)	RA: 123.274 mas/yr Dec.: 853.639 mas/yr
Parallax (π)	54.7359±0.0176 mas
Distance	59.59 ± 0.02 ly (18.270 ± 0.006 pc)
Absolute magnitude (M_{V})	+5.41

Details
Mass	0.89±0.04 M_{☉}
Radius	0.85±0.01 R_{☉}
Luminosity	0.620±0.002 L_{☉}
Surface gravity (log g)	4.53±0.01 cgs
Temperature	5,557±15 K
Metallicity [Fe/H]	−0.14±0.04 dex
Rotation	27.8±1.7 d
Age	4.10±1.20 Gyr

Other designations
- BD+47°2420, GC 23011, GJ 651, HD 154345, HIP 83389, SAO 46452, GCRV 9834

Database references
SIMBAD	data
Exoplanet Archive	data

HD 154345 is a star in the northern constellation of Hercules. With an apparent visual magnitude of +6.76 it is a challenge to view with the naked eye, but using binoculars it is an easy target. The distance to this star is 59.6 light years based on parallax, but it is drifting closer with a radial velocity of −47 km/s. At least one exoplanet is orbiting this star.

The stellar classification of HD 154345 is G8V, matching an ordinary G-type main-sequence star that is generating energy by core hydrogen fusion. The magnetic activity cycle of this star is correlated with the radial velocity variations induced by its putative planetary companion. It is around four billion years old and is spinning with a rotation period of 28 days. The star is smaller and less massive than the Sun. It is radiating 62% of the luminosity of the Sun from its photosphere at an effective temperature of 5,557 K.

== Planetary system ==
In 2006, a long-period, wide-orbiting planet was observed by radial velocity, and published in May 2007, gaining the designation HD 154345 b. It has been called a "Jupiter twin". While the existence of HD 154345 b has been unclear due to the correlation of its orbital period with the star's activity cycle, a study in 2021 confirmed its planetary nature.

The complete observation of its nine-year orbit rules out any interior planets of minimum mass (m sini) greater than 0.3 Jupiter. The star rotates at an inclination of 50^{+40}_{−26} degrees relative to Earth. It is probable that the planet shares that inclination. In 2023, the inclination and true mass of HD 154345 b were determined via astrometry, consistent within the margin of error with the stellar rotational inclination. More precise measurements found a nearly edge-on inclination.

The system's habitable zone stretches from 0.64 AU out to 1.26 AU, and is narrower than the Sun's. It forms a stable region where an Earth-mass exoplanet could orbit.

The HD 154345 planetary system
Companion (in order from star)	Mass	Semimajor axis (AU)	Orbital period (years)	Eccentricity	Inclination (°)	Radius
b	1.186+0.095 −0.059 M_{J}	4.158+0.066 −0.067	8.981+0.079 −0.076	0.058±0.019	88±20	—
