= NGC 6229 =

Globular cluster in the constellation Hercules

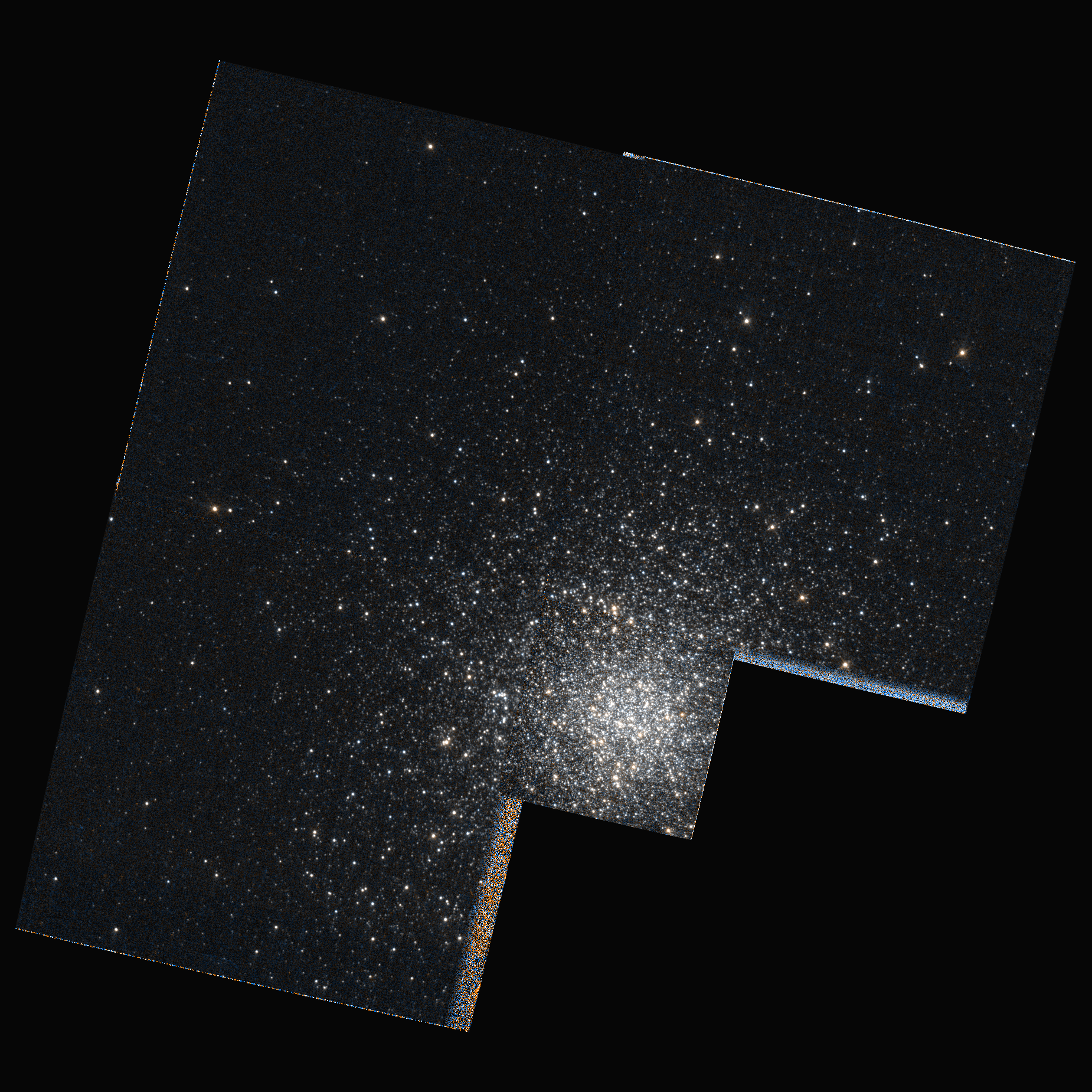
- NGC 6229 as seen through the Hubble Space Telescope

Observation data (J2000 epoch)
- Class: VII
- Constellation: Hercules
- Right ascension: 16^{h} 46^{m} 58.8^{s}
- Declination: +47° 31′ 40″
- Apparent magnitude (V): 9.4
- Apparent dimensions (V): 4.50'

Physical characteristics
- Absolute magnitude: −8.06
- Metallicity: [Fe/H] = −1.13±0.06 dex
- Other designations: GCL 47

NGC 6229, also known as the Prize Comet Cluster, is a globular cluster located in the constellation Hercules. It is designated as GC(v)B in the galaxy morphological classification scheme and was discovered by the British astronomer William Herschel on 12 May 1787. NGC 6229 is located at about 100,000 light years away from Earth.

It is an intermediate-metallicity globular cluster with two distinct generations of stars, and may be the remnant core of a spheroidal dwarf galaxy.

== See also ==
- List of NGC objects (6001–7000)
