= HD 156668 b =

Exoplanet that orbits the star HD 156668 in the constellation of Hercules

Discovery
- Discovered by: Howard et al.
- Discovery site: Keck Observatory
- Discovery date: January 6, 2010
- Detection method: Doppler Spectroscopy

Orbital characteristics
- Semi-major axis: 0.04998 ± 0.00083 AU (7,477,000 ± 124,000 km)
- Eccentricity: 0.000
- Orbital period (sidereal): 4.6455 ± 0.0011 d
- Argument of periastron: 0
- Semi-amplitude: 1.89 ± 0.26
- Star: HD 156668

HD 156668 b is an extrasolar planet orbiting the star HD 156668 78.5 light-years away in the constellation Hercules. It has a minimum mass of 3.1 Earth masses. At the time of discovery it was the second least massive planet discovered by the radial velocity method after Gliese 581 e, subject to the mass/inclination degeneracy that affects radial velocity measurements. In addition to this, it has the lowest semi-amplitude, or the speed of the stellar wobble caused by planet's gravity tugging on the star determined by radial velocity, at 2.2 m/s. This planet was discovered on January 6, 2010; it is the 8th planet discovered in 2010 after the first five planets detected by Kepler on January 4 and two planets around HD 9446 on January 5.
