= HD 155358 =

Star in the constellation Hercules

Observation data Epoch J2000 Equinox ICRS
- Constellation: Hercules
- Right ascension: 17^{h} 09^{m} 34.61764^{s}
- Declination: +33° 21′ 21.0856″
- Apparent magnitude (V): 7.27

Characteristics
- Evolutionary stage: main sequence
- Spectral type: G0 (F7VgG0mF5)
- B−V color index: 0.545

Astrometry
Radial velocity (R_{v})	−9.24±0.12 km/s
Proper motion (μ)	RA: −222.217 mas/yr Dec.: −215.865 mas/yr
Parallax (π)	22.9212±0.0131 mas
Distance	142.29 ± 0.08 ly (43.63 ± 0.02 pc)
Absolute magnitude (M_{V})	4.06

Details
Mass	0.85 M_{☉}
Radius	1.4 R_{☉}
Luminosity	1.9 L_{☉}
Surface gravity (log g)	4.28 cgs
Temperature	5,987 K
Metallicity [Fe/H]	−0.65 dex
Rotational velocity (v sin i)	3.1 km/s
Age	10.9 Gyr

Other designations
- BD+33 2840, SAO 65834, Wolf 646, HIP 83949

Database references
SIMBAD	data

HD 155358 is a low metallicity yellow dwarf star 44 pc away in the constellation Hercules. This star is known to be orbited by two extrasolar planets.

The star is 11.9 billion years old and has a mass 0.85 times that of the Sun. At the time of the planets' discoveries, it was notable for being the lowest metallicity planet-bearing star known, with an iron-to-hydrogen ratio 21% of the solar value.

== Observation ==
With a visual magnitude of 7.5, this star can not be observed with the unaided eye. Hence it was discovered only after the introduction of the telescope. In 1859 it was catalogued in the Bonner Durchmusterung by the Prussian astronomer F. W. Argelander, who listed an estimated visual magnitude of 7.2. In 1958 it was identified as a star with a relatively large proper motion by the Nizamiah Observatory, Hyderabad. It was suggested in 1979 that this star may lie within 25 parsecs of the Sun. (Up to that time it had never been catalogued as a nearby star.)

Beginning in 2001, this star underwent observation using the High Resolution Spectrograph on the Hobby-Eberly Telescope at McDonald Observatory. Changes were observed in the radial velocity motion of the star, indicating a gravitational influence from orbiting objects. Based on the motion of the star over time, astronomers were able to deduce that there are at least two planets in orbit around HD 155358.

== Planetary system ==
On 10 May 2007, astronomers included Cochran from the University of Texas announced two mass type II planets orbiting the same star with the lowest metal content than any planetary host stars. Its discoveries were made by using the Hobby-Eberly Telescope, which used radial velocity to monitor the change of line of sight motion of the star caused by gravity of the planets. These two planets gravitationally interact: modelling the planets assuming their masses are the same as the empirically-determined lower limits, they exchange eccentricities on a timescale of 2700 years, and their arguments of periastron precess on a timescale of 2300 years. HD 155358 b has mass little bit less than Jupiter but more than Saturn. HD 155358 c has 0.8 the mass of Jupiter. HD 155358 b orbits at 0.64 AU while c orbits at 1.02 AU. These two planets are near exact mutual 2:1 mean motion resonance (MMR).

The HD 155358 planetary system
Companion (in order from star)	Mass	Semimajor axis (AU)	Orbital period (days)	Eccentricity	Inclination (°)	Radius
b	> 0.85 ± 0.05 M_{J}	0.64 ± 0.01	194.3 ± 0.3	0.17 ± 0.03	—	—
c	> 0.82 ± 0.07 M_{J}	1.02 ± 0.02	391.9 ± 1	0.16 ± 0.1	—	—
