= Alpha Herculis =

Multiple star system in the constellation Hercules

α Herculis
- Location of α Herculis (circled)

Observation data Epoch J2000 Equinox ICRS
- Constellation: Hercules
- A
- Right ascension: 17^{h} 14^{m} 38.853^{s}
- Declination: +14° 23′ 25.34″
- Apparent magnitude (V): 2.7–4.0
- B
- Right ascension: 17^{h} 14^{m} 39.181^{s}
- Declination: +14° 23′ 23.98″
- Apparent magnitude (V): 5.322

Characteristics

A
- Evolutionary stage: AGB
- Spectral type: M5 Ib-II
- U−B color index: +1.01
- B−V color index: +1.45
- Variable type: SRc

B
- Spectral type: G8III + A9IV-V

Astrometry
Proper motion (μ)	RA: −7.32 mas/yr Dec.: 36.07 mas/yr
Parallax (π)	9.07±1.32 mas
Distance	approx. 360 ly (approx. 110 pc)
Absolute magnitude (M_{V})	−2.3 + 1.8 + 2.8

Details

A
Mass	2.5+1.6 −1.1 M_{☉}
Radius	284 ± 60, 264–303 R_{☉}
Luminosity	7,244–9,333 L_{☉}
Surface gravity (log g)	−0.41±0.19 cgs
Temperature	3,155–3,365 K

Ba
Mass	~2.5 M_{☉}
Luminosity	126 L_{☉}
Temperature	4,900 K

Bb
Mass	~2 M_{☉}
Luminosity	26 L_{☉}
Temperature	7,350 K
Age	0.41–1.25 Gyr

Other designations
- Ras Algethi, Rasalgethi, α Her, 64 Her, BD+14°3207, HIP 84345, CCDM J17146+1424, AAVSO 1710+14, WDS J17146+1423
- A: HD 156014, HR 6406, SAO 102680
- B: HD 156015, HR 6407, SAO 102681

Database references
SIMBAD	α Her
- A
- B

Alpha Herculis (α Herculis, abbreviated Alpha Her, α Her), also designated Rasalgethi and 64 Herculis, is a multiple star system in the constellation of Hercules. Appearing as a single point of light to the naked eye, it is resolvable into a number of components through a telescope. It has a combined apparent magnitude of 3.08, although the brightest component is variable in brightness. Based on parallax measurements obtained during the Hipparcos mission, it is approximately 360 light-years (110 parsecs) distant from the Sun. Five degrees east-south-east of Rasalgethi lies Rasalhague, the brightest star in Ophiuchus. These stars may be among the closest-lying pair of alpha stars in the entire sky. Despite the star designated as "alpha", it is actually the 5th brightest star in Hercules.

== System ==
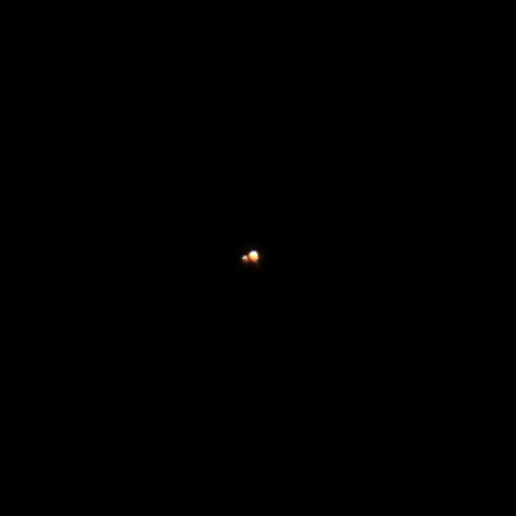
A view of Alpha Herculis in a small telescope. The components A and B are resolved with angular separation of 4.64'' (in 2020).

Alpha Herculis is a triple star system. The primary (brightest) of the three stars, designated α^{1} Herculis or α Herculis A, is a pulsating variable star on the asymptotic giant branch (AGB). The primary star forms a visual binary pair with a second star, which is itself a spectroscopic binary.

Alpha Herculis also forms the A and B components of a wider system designated WDS J17146+1423, with two additional faint visual companions designated WDS J17146+1423C and D. The two fainter stars are far more distant than the triple system.

== Nomenclature ==
α Herculis (Latinised to Alpha Herculis) is the system's Bayer designation; α^{1} and α^{2} Herculis, those of its two visible components. 64 Herculis is the system's Flamsteed designation. WDS J17146+1423 is the wider system's designation in the Washington Double Star Catalog. The designations of Alpha Herculis' main components as Alpha Herculis A and B and the wider system's four components as WDS J17146+1423A, B, C and D, together with the spectroscopic pair - Alpha Herculis Ba and Bb - derive from the convention used by the Washington Multiplicity Catalog (WMC) for multiple star systems, and adopted by the International Astronomical Union (IAU).

Alpha Herculis bore the traditional name Rasalgethi or Ras Algethi (Arabic: رأس الجاثي ra‘is al-jāthī 'Head of the Kneeler'). 'Head' comes from the fact that in antiquity Hercules was depicted upside down on maps of the constellation. In 2016, the IAU organized a Working Group on Star Names (WGSN) to catalog and standardize proper names for stars. The WGSN approved the name Rasalgethi for the component Alpha Herculis A (α^{1}) on 30 June 2016 and it is now so included in the List of IAU-approved Star Names.

The term ra's al-jaθiyy or Ras al Djathi appeared in the catalogue of stars in the Calendarium of Al Achsasi al Mouakket, which was translated into Latin as Caput Ingeniculi.

In Chinese astronomy, Alpha Herculis is called 帝座, Pinyin: Dìzuò, meaning 'Emperor's Seat'. The star is seen as marking itself, and stands alone in the center of the Emperor's Seat asterism, Heavenly Market enclosure (see: Chinese constellations). 帝座 (Dìzuò) was westernized into Ti Tso by R.H. Allen, with the same meaning.

== Properties ==
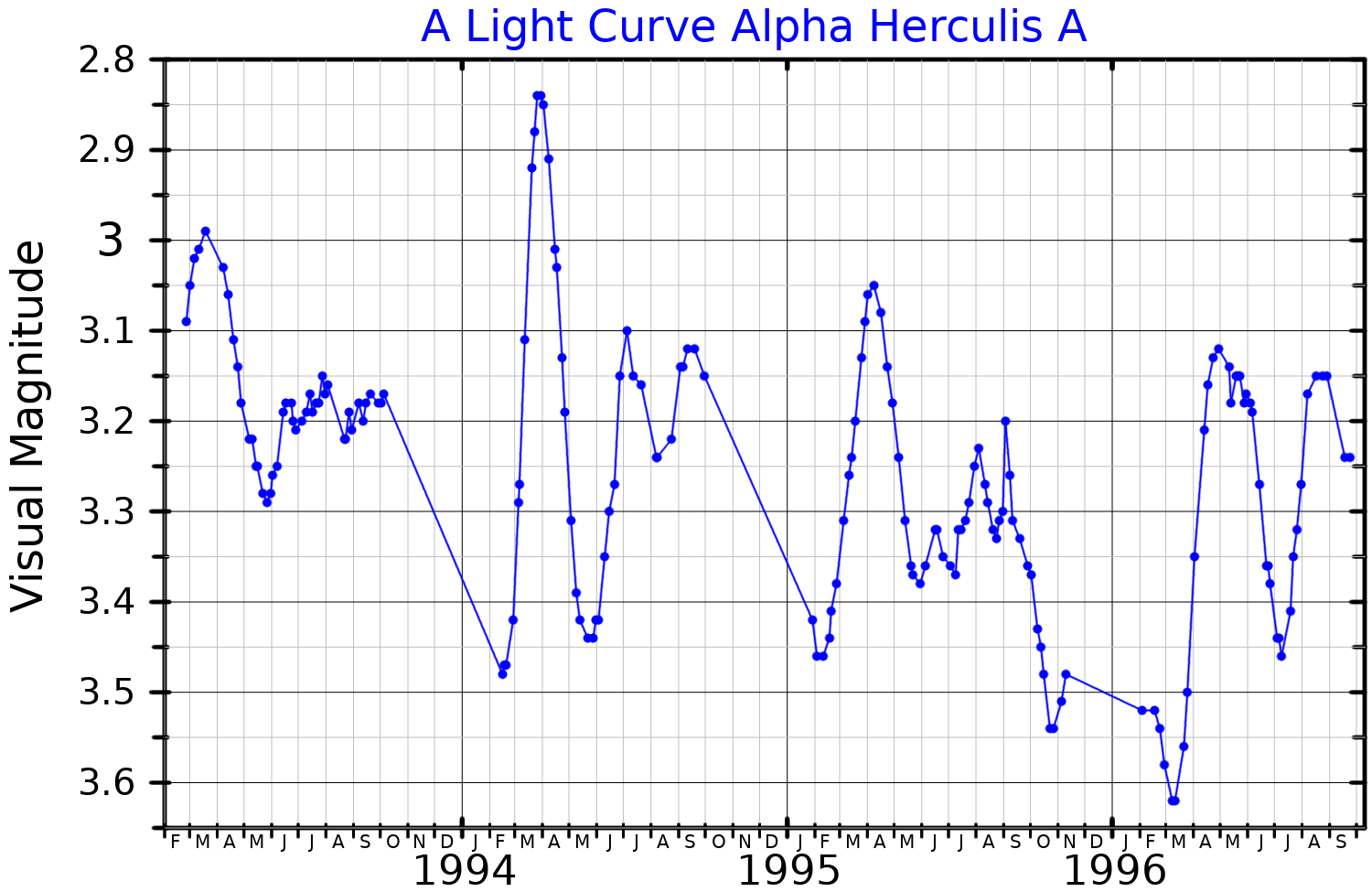
A light curve for Alpha Herculis A, plotted from data published by Wasatonic (1997)

Alpha Herculis A and B are more than 500 AU apart, with an estimated orbital period of approximately 3600 years. A presents as a relatively massive red bright giant, but radial velocity measurements suggest a companion with a period of the order of a decade. B's two components are a primary yellow giant star and a secondary, yellow-white dwarf star in a 51.578 day orbit.

Alpha Herculis A is an asymptotic giant branch (AGB) star, a luminous red giant that has both hydrogen and helium shells around a degenerate carbon-oxygen core. It is the second nearest AGB star to the Sun. Its radius pulsates between 264 and 303 solar radii. At its minimum, the effective temperature is of 3,155 K (2,882 °C) and the luminosity is of 7,200 solar luminosities, while at its maximum the temperature is of 3,365 K (3,092 °C) and the luminosity is of 9,330 solar luminosities. If Alpha Herculis were at the center of the Solar System its radius would extend past the orbit of Earth at 1.23 – 1.4 AU but not quite as far as the orbit of Mars or the asteroid belt. The red giant is estimated to have started its life with about 2.175-3.250 M_{☉}.

The primary has been specified as a standard star for the spectral class M5 Ib-II. Like most type M stars near the end of their lives, Alpha Herculis is experiencing a high degree of stellar mass loss creating a sparse, gaseous envelope that extends at least 930 AU. It is a semiregular variable with complex changes in brightness with periods ranging from a few weeks to many years. The most noticeable variations occur at timescales of 80–140 days and at 1,000 - 3,000 days. The strongest detectable period is 128 days. The full range in brightness is from magnitude 2.7 to 4.0, but it usually varies over a much smaller range of around 0.6 magnitudes.
