= Pi Herculis =

Star in the constellation Hercules

π Herculis
- Location of π Herculis (circled in red)

Observation data Epoch J2000.0 Equinox ICRS
- Constellation: Hercules
- Right ascension: 17^{h} 15^{m} 02.83424^{s}
- Declination: +36° 48′ 32.9816″
- Apparent magnitude (V): +3.15

Characteristics
- Spectral type: K3 II
- U−B color index: +1.66
- B−V color index: +1.45
- Variable type: suspected

Astrometry
Radial velocity (R_{v})	−25.57±0.20 km/s
Proper motion (μ)	RA: −27.402 mas/yr Dec.: 2.925 mas/yr
Parallax (π)	8.8991±0.1323 mas
Distance	367 ± 5 ly (112 ± 2 pc)
Absolute magnitude (M_{V})	−2.10+0.13 −0.12

Details
Mass	3.77±0.2 M_{☉}
Radius	64.02+0.89 −0.91 R_{☉}
Luminosity	1,176±67 L_{☉}
Surface gravity (log g)	1.26±0.05 cgs
Temperature	4,223±53 K
Metallicity [Fe/H]	0.01±0.1 dex
Rotational velocity (v sin i)	6.12 km/s
Age	220±40 Myr

Other designations
- Nüchuang, π Her, 67 Her, BD+36°2844, FK5 643, HD 156283, HIP 84380, HR 6418, SAO 65890

Database references
SIMBAD	data

Pi Herculis, Latinized from π Herculis, formally named Nüchuang, is a third-magnitude star in the constellation Hercules. As one of the four stars in the Keystone asterism, specifically representing the northeastern corner, it is one of the constellation's more easily recognized. It has an apparent visual magnitude of +3.2, which is visible to the naked eye and makes it one of its brighter members. The Gaia spacecraft mission estimated its distance at roughly 112 parsecs from Earth, or about 367 light years away. The overall reduction in the star's visual magnitude due to extinction from the intervening cosmic dust is 0.11.

== Nomenclature ==
Pi Herculis (Latinized from π Herculis, abbreviated π Her) is the star's Bayer designation. In Chinese astronomy, this star is part of the asterism Nǚ Chuáng (Woman's Bed, 女床). The IAU Working Group on Star Names adopted the name Nüchuang for this star on 14 May 2026.

== Properties ==
Pi Herculis is a bright giant star with a stellar classification of K3 II. P.C. Keenan and R. E. Pitts (1980) graded it as a spectral type K3 IIab and it is sometimes listed with this alternate classification. The star is enormous compared to the Sun, having a mass that is 4.5 times solar and a radius approximately 60 times depending on which wavelength the star's angular diameter is measured at. Due to limb darkening, all giant and supergiant stars present unique challenges when measuring their photosphere. This orange-hued giant shines with 1,330 times the luminosity of the Sun. It is a low-amplitude photometric variable star showing a typical change of roughly 0.0054 in magnitude over a 24-hour period.

== Radial velocity variations ==
Low-amplitude radial velocity variations with a period of 613 days in the bright giant have suggested the possible presence of a substellar companion. If this is really due to a low-mass object, such a companion would be as small as 0.027 solar masses (27 times the mass of Jupiter, probably a brown dwarf) and 3 astronomical units away from the bright primary. A substellar companion is only one of several hypotheses to explain the star's behaviour. Most likely the cause of the variation is weak pulsation of the star's atmosphere.

With a luminosity more than 1,000 times that of the Sun, an orbit where a planet could be habitable would be located 37 AU away from Pi Herculis—in Solar System terms, halfway between Neptune's and Pluto's orbits. On the other hand, a putative companion would orbit in a scorching region and would be as hot as a planet would at 0.08 AU around a Sun-like star. In any case it's likely that it would soon be swallowed up by the expanding giant.

== See also ==
- Pi2 Ursae Majoris
- Beta Ophiuchi
