= Eta Herculis =

Star in the constellation Hercules

- Location of η Herculis (circled)

Observation data Epoch J2000 Equinox ICRS
- Constellation: Hercules
- Right ascension: 16^{h} 42^{m} 53.7653^{s}
- Declination: +38° 55′ 20.116″
- Apparent magnitude (V): 3.487

Characteristics
- Spectral type: G7.5 IIIb
- U−B color index: +0.61
- B−V color index: +0.92

Astrometry
Radial velocity (R_{v})	+8.3 km/s
Proper motion (μ)	RA: +35.58 mas/yr Dec.: −84.98 mas/yr
Parallax (π)	29.11±0.52 mas
Distance	112 ± 2 ly (34.4 ± 0.6 pc)
Absolute magnitude (M_{V})	+0.84

Details
Mass	2.01±0.11 M_{☉}
Radius	9.28±0.05 R_{☉}
Luminosity	45.8±2.3 L_{☉}
Temperature	5,025±65 K
Metallicity [Fe/H]	−0.198 dex
Rotational velocity (v sin i)	8 km/s
Age	1.08±0.18 Gyr

Other designations
- η Her, 44 Her, BD+39 3029, FK5 626, GC 22502, GJ 636, HD 150997, HIP 81833, HR 6220, SAO 65504, CCDM J16428+3855A

Database references
SIMBAD	data

Eta Herculis (η Her, η Herculis) is a third-magnitude star in the constellation Hercules. It is located at 110 light-years from Earth.

== Properties ==
Eta Herculis is a G-type giant star. With a stellar classification G7.5IIIb, it is considerably larger and more evolved than the Sun, having a mass that is two times solar and a radius 9.3 times. Though it only shines with an apparent magnitude of 3.48, it is part of the "Keystone" asterism, visible overhead in the mid-summer night sky to northern observers, allowing it to be easily recognized. Eta Herculis is 46 times more luminous than the Sun. The Hipparcos satellite mission estimated its distance at roughly 34.4 parsecs from Earth, or 112 light years away.

If one follows the line connecting Eta Herculis with Zeta Herculis one comes across one of the earliest and most stunning globular clusters in the nighttime sky, M13, discovered in 1714 by Edmond Halley.

Eta Herculis is a double star once thought to be part of a binary star system.
