= NGC 6210 =

Planetary nebula in the constellation Hercules

Emission nebula
- Planetary nebula
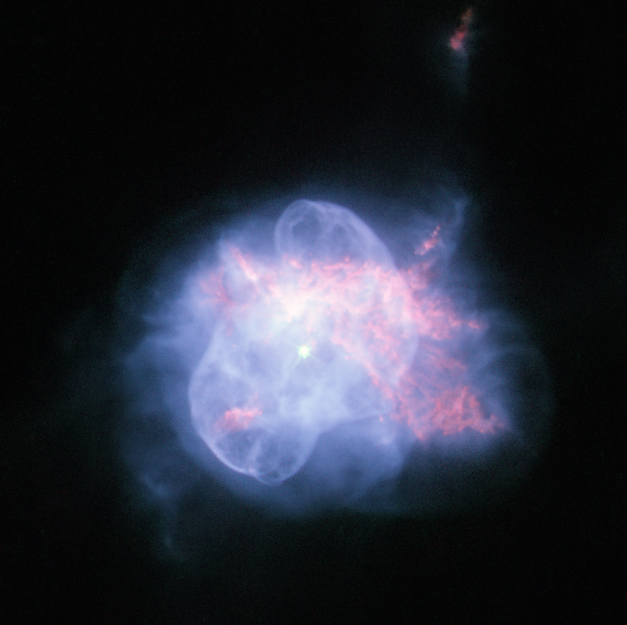
- A Hubble Space Telescope (HST) image of NGC 6210

Observation data: J2000 epoch
- Right ascension: 16^{h} 44^{m} 29.51960^{s}
- Declination: +23° 47′ 59.4913″
- Distance: 5.4 ± 1.3 kly (1.7 ± 0.4 kpc) ly
- Apparent dimensions (V): 40″ × 30″
- Constellation: Hercules

Physical characteristics
- Radius: 0.5 ly
- Designations: PN G043.1+37.7, BD+24° 3048, HD 151121, IRAS 16423+2353, NGC 6210

NGC 6210, sometimes also known as the Turtle Nebula or simply the Turtle, is a planetary nebula located approximately 5.4 ± 1.3 kly from the Sun in the constellation of Hercules. It is a bright nebula. It is positioned about 38° above the galactic plane at a vertical distance of about 3.3 kilolight-years (1 kpc), this is unusually high for a nebula. Due to its position, it has little extinction from intervening interstellar dust.

The nebula formed as a result of material being shed from a low mass progenitor star less massive than the Sun (~0.9 M_{☉}) the complex structure and appearance of NGC 6210 has led to proposals that the nebula was shaped by mass transfer in a triple star system.

This object was first recorded as a star-like feature by Joseph Lalande on March 22, 1799. However, credit for the discovery of a nebula goes to Wilhelm Struve in 1825. John L. E. Dreyer described it as, "a planetary nebula, very bright, very small, round, disc and border".

== Characteristics ==
=== Structure ===
The structure of NGC 6210 is complex having an unusual morphology being described as very amorphous and irregular in shape (rough ellipsoid) about 0.5 light years in radius. The nebula contains shells, lobes, knots, and haloes. The nebula consists of main two parts; a bright inner region and a faint outer region. The inner region is filled with arches and filaments spanning 13″ × 16". This region has an expansion velocity ranging over 19–24 km/s. The outer region is larger and fainter. It has a pair of "tubular" structures. Emissions from the outer part of the nebula is only about 1% of the total.

The nebula contains five distinct axes which material is ejected. The first is the bipolar, inner shell blown from stellar winds. The second is the lop-sided, elliptical, fainter however more massive intermediate shell. Two more axes are bipolar flows that form the point symmetric, high-ionization outer lobes. The final axis traces the collimated outflows of low-ionization knots. Many of these knots that are redshifted have ages greater than 2000 years while those which are blueshifted have ages less than 2000 years. Starting at or before the initial ionization of the nebula around 3500 years ago, the nebula experienced major changes in the direction of its outflows.

==== Halo ====
Surrounding the nebula is a halo-like structure that is nearly twice as large however with a much fainter surface than the main nebula. There are four arm-like extensions in the halo. Kinematics of the halo show that it is highly disturbed with evidence for at least three circularly symmetric, low-amplitude ripples within the halo.

==== Abundances ====
The nebula contains a low amount of helium and oxygen. The nitrogen and argon abundances of NGC 6210 is low and nearly that of the Sun. These abundance of carbon is also low, even lower than the solar value. Elements with especially low abundances include silicon, iron, potassium, chlorine, phosphorus, sodium and magnesium. The abundances of oxygen, sulfur and neon is average for nebula located in its galactic position. These low chemical abundances suggest that the star that formed the nebula may not have gone through a second dredge-up phase. The low abundance carbon indicates that the third dredge-up phase may have not occurred.

The values seen in NGC 6210 may be inaccurate due to methods of determining these values. For example, the abundance of sulfurs is consistently lower than that of the Sun suggesting errors. An example of possible inaccuracies can be found in the abundance of magnesium. The values for magnesium may be lower due to a small amount of it being present in magnesium sulfide (MgS). There is no indication for magnesium to be associated with dust grains located in the nebula as seen in the infrared spectrum of some other nebulae.

=== Central star ===
The nebula contains a star located in the central region of NGC 6210. The central star is a hydrogen-rich O(H) type star that has an apparent visual magnitude of 12.66. It is estimated that the temperature of the star is around 65,000 K. The chemical abundances of the nebula, specifically the low values for certain elements such as helium, oxygen, nitrogen and carbon, suggest a low initial mass for the central star, probably ~0.9 M_{☉}.

Outflow from this star has been measured with velocities of 2,180 km/s, and the estimated mass loss rate is 2.2×10^{−9} M_{☉} yr^{−1}. There appears to be a collaminated jet feature to the northwest, suggesting the central star is ejecting material along two and possibly four such directions. The curvature of these jets suggest a possible rotation of the collimating source.

== Gallery ==
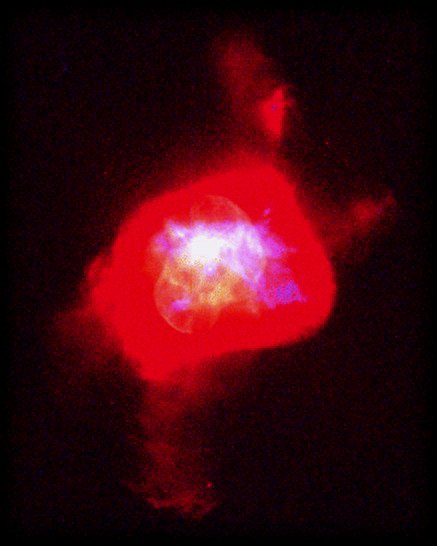
The center of NGC 6210

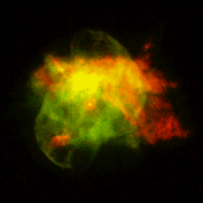

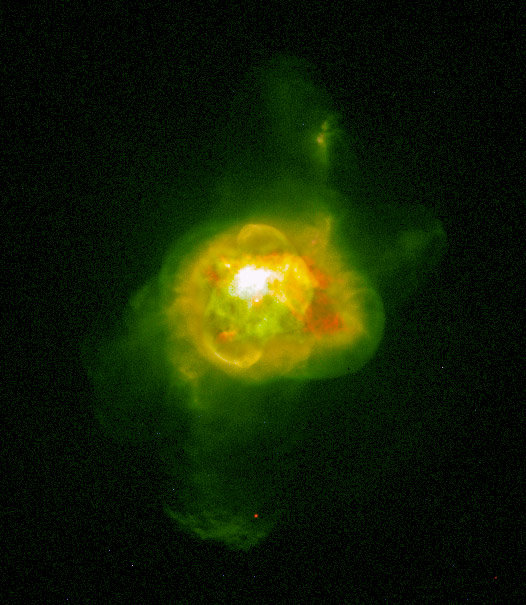

== See also ==
- List of planetary nebulae
