= 3C 345 =

Quasar in the Hercules constellation

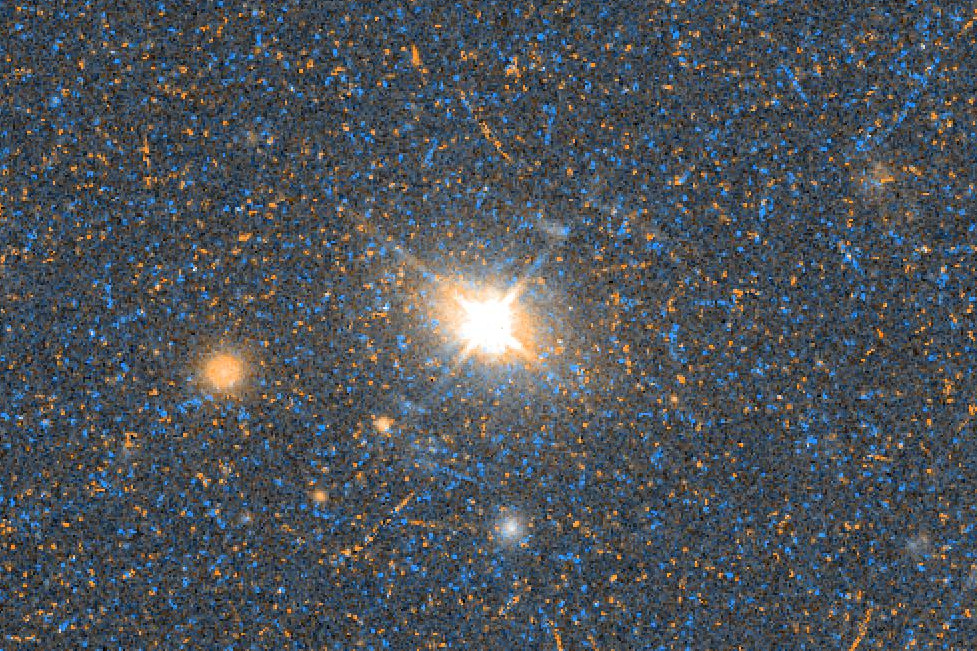
- Image of 3C 345 by the Hubble Space Telescope

Observation data (Epoch J2000)
- Constellation: Hercules
- Right ascension: 16^{h} 42^{m} 58.8^{s}
- Declination: +39° 48′ 37″
- Redshift: 0.5934
- Distance: 5.497 Gly
- Type: Opt.var.;HPQ, FSRQ
- Apparent magnitude (V): 16.6
- Notable features: superluminal jet

Other designations
- 4C +39.48, LEDA 084767

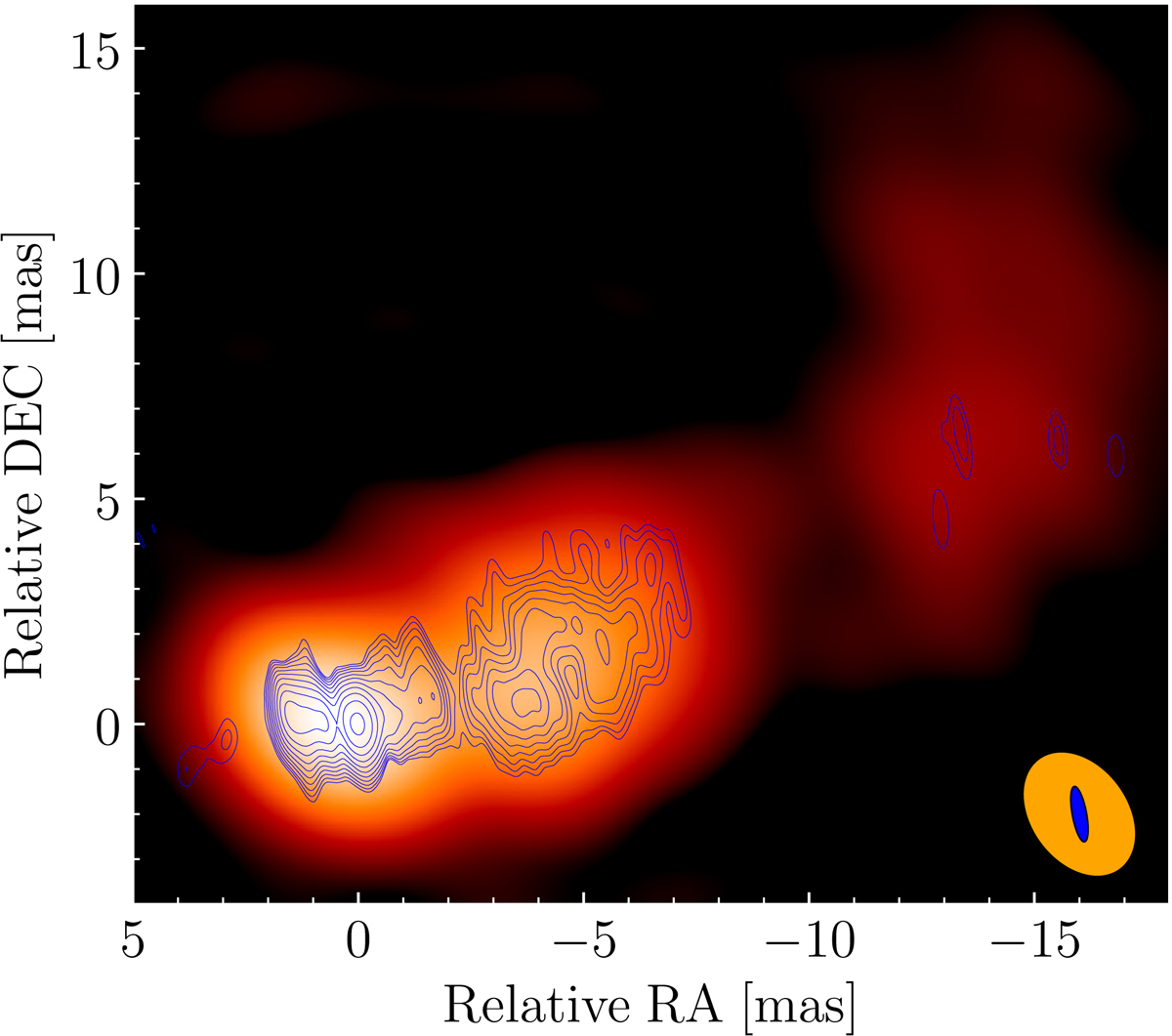
Total intensity image of the inner region of 3C 345 at 1.6 GHz

3C 345 is a blazar, subtype flat-spectrum radio quasar, that is located in the constellation of Hercules. It is noted for hosting a superluminal jet and its variability in almost all wave bands.

== Characteristics ==
3C 345 has an active galactic nucleus that has been categorised as a blazar or as a flat spectrum radio quasar. The host galaxy of 3C 345 is an E3 elliptical galaxy without prominent peculiar characteristics.

=== Superluminal jet ===
When observed in radio waves, 3C 345 features a compact region with a radio jet emanating from it for 3 arcseconds and ending at a hot spot. The jet appears straight for 4 milliarcseconds (mas) but then curves northwards. Hot spots are visible at the counterjet direction in radio images. There is also a faint halo. The jet has been found to emit X-rays, up until 0.2 arcseconds from a radio hot spot, which could be in reality a bend of the jet.

The radio jet exhibits superluminal motion for 0.12 to 12 mas, with apparent speeds that accelerate from ~5c to ~15c within 0.3 mas. Within the jet lies a stationary feature ~0.1 mas (with corresponds to about 0.7 pc at the distance of 3C 345) from the core, which has also been found in other blazars. The viewing angle between the jet axis and the line of sight is calculated to be about 5°.

=== Variability ===
3C 345 has been known to fluctuate in brightness. For example, it brightened from magnitude 17.2 to 16.0 between 10 April 2018 and 8 May 2018 when observed in R band. A bright GeV gamma-ray flare was observed by the Fermi Gamma-ray Space Telescope on 31 May 2017, as the flux increased by 40 times above average. The flares in 2009 were observed simultaneously in γ-rays, X-rays and optical/UV, while there was a lag before they were observed in radiowaves. A long term variability study indicates flares every 3.5 to 4 years, coinciding with the appearance of new features in the radio jets.

It has been suggested that the source of the fluctuation is the presence of a binary supermassive black hole, with the two similar black holes with masses about 7.1×10^{8} M_{☉} which are separated by around 0.33 pc and orbit each other with a period of 480 years. The second black hole perturbates the accretion disk, resulting to fluctuations in activity. The X-rays observations indicate that the nuclear region is hidden behind a compton thick absorber with a column density of N_{H} ≃ 10^{25} cm^{−2} that covers 75% to 85% of the X-rays source.
