= HD 154345 b =

Jupiter-Like exoplanet in the constellation Hercules

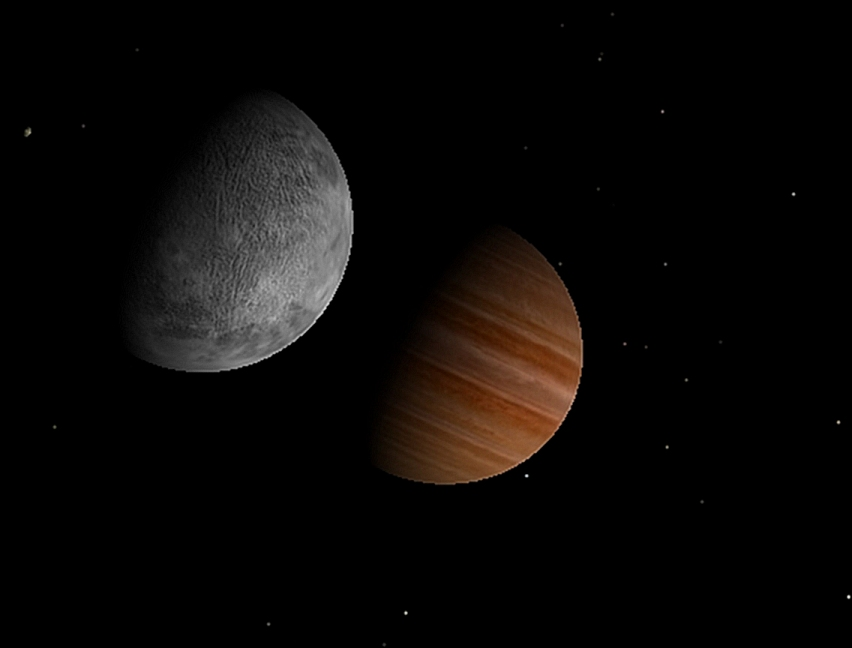
- Planet HD 154345 b (min mass ~1 MJ) in the background with two hypothetical moons visible. Image was created with Celestia V1.41 using a custom map for the Planet and its moons

Discovery
- Discovered by: Wright et al.
- Discovery site: United States
- Discovery date: March 12, 2006 (published: May 27, 2007)
- Detection method: radial velocity

Orbital characteristics
- Semi-major axis: 4.2+0.14 −0.15 AU
- Eccentricity: 0.157+0.03 −0.029
- Orbital period (sidereal): 3342±40 d 9.15±0.11 yr
- Average orbital speed: 13.7
- Inclination: 69°+13° −12° or 111°+12° −13°
- Longitude of ascending node: 77°+38° −53°
- Time of periastron: 2458428+72 −116
- Argument of periastron: 319.6°+8.7° −8.4°
- Semi-amplitude: 14.28 ± 0.75
- Star: HD 154345

Physical characteristics
- Mass: 1.186+0.095 −0.059 M_{J}
- Temperature: 111±2 K

HD 154345 b is a Jupiter-mass extrasolar planet orbiting the star HD 154345.

== Discovery ==
Wright et al. discovered the planet in March 2006 using the radial velocity method to detect the small wobbling movement of the star caused by the gravity of the planet. The discovery was published in May 2007.

While the existence of HD 154345 b has been unclear due to the correlation of its orbital period with the star's activity cycle, a study in 2021 further confirmed its planetary nature. In 2023, the inclination and true mass of HD 154345 b were determined via astrometry.

== Characteristics ==
The planet has a mass slightly greater than that of Jupiter. It orbits its parent star at a distance of 4.18 AU. Its orbital period is about 9.15 Earth years and its orbit is near-circular. There are no interior planets of minimum mass (m sini) greater than 0.3 Jupiter. Jupiter-like planets with these orbital and system characteristics are unlikely to be perturbed from the star's inclination. Since the star's inclination is known as around 50°, this would make the planet's most likely mass greater than Jupiter's mass but less than twice that mass.

As such HD 154345 b is presumed to be a gas giant "Jupiter twin". Depending on composition the two planets may be around the same size, or HD 154345 b may be larger. This planet may also harbor a system of moons and rings.

== See also ==
- HIP 11915 b, another "Jupiter twin" exoplanet.
