= Messier 92 =

Globular cluster in the constellation Hercules

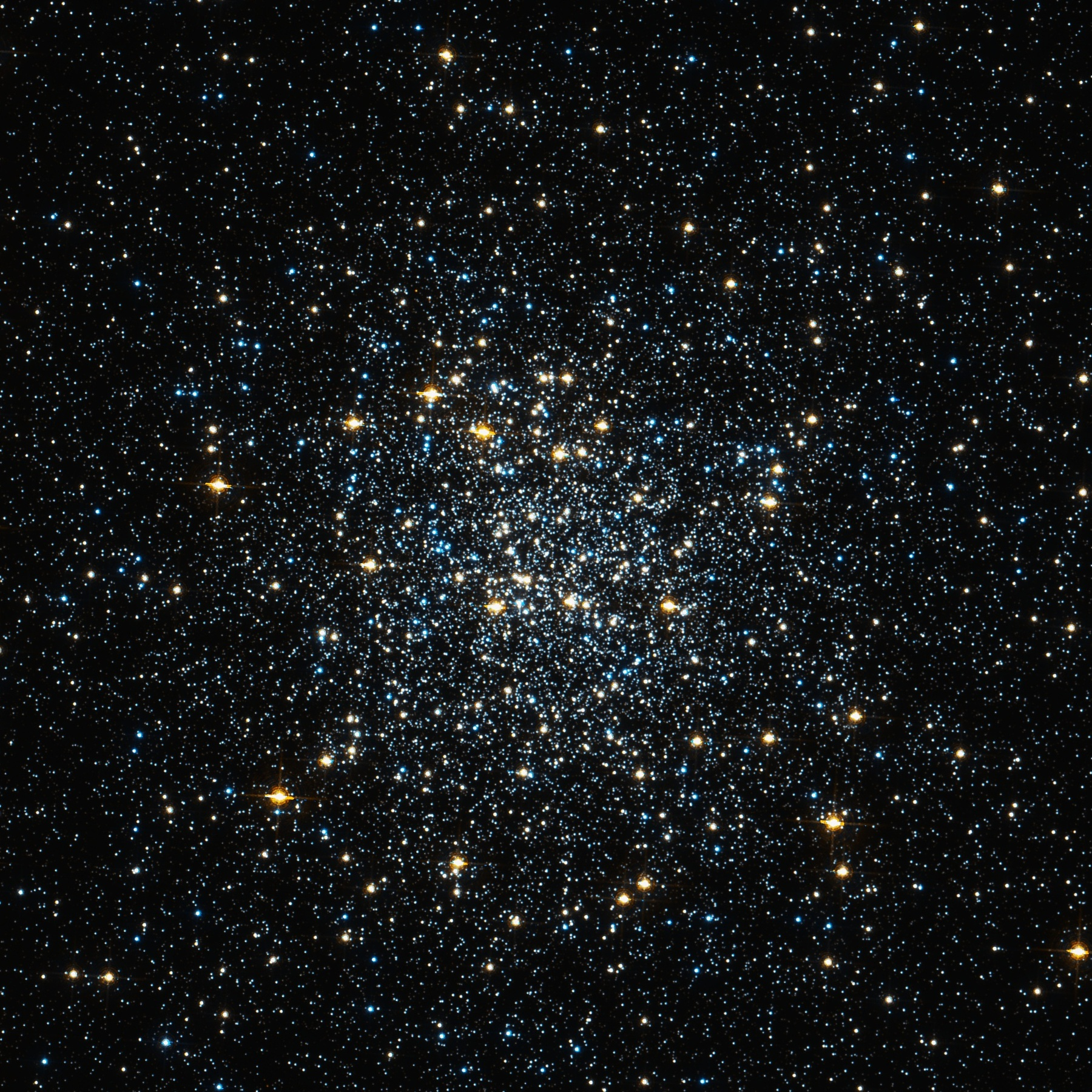
- Center of M92 by HST; 1.44′ view

Observation data (J2000 epoch)
- Class: IV
- Constellation: Hercules
- Right ascension: 17^{h} 17^{m} 07.39^{s}
- Declination: +43° 08′ 09.4″
- Distance: 26.7×10^{3} ly (8.2 kpc)
- Apparent magnitude (V): 6.4
- Apparent dimensions (V): 14' arc minutes

Physical characteristics
- Mass: 2.0×10^{5} M_{☉}
- Radius: 54 ly
- Metallicity: [Fe/H] = –2.32 dex
- Other designations: M92, NGC 6341, GCl 59

Messier 92 (also known as M92, M 92, or NGC 6341) is a globular cluster of stars in the northern constellation of Hercules.

== Discovery ==
It was discovered by Johann Elert Bode on December 27, 1777, then published in the Berliner Astronomisches Jahrbuch during 1779. It was inadvertently rediscovered by Charles Messier on March 18, 1781, (Note: On March 18) and added as the 92nd entry in his catalogue. William Herschel first resolved individual stars in 1783.

== Visibility ==
It is one of the brighter of its sort in apparent magnitude in the northern hemisphere and in its absolute magnitude in the galaxy, but it is often overlooked by amateur astronomers due to angular proximity to bright cluster Messier 13, about 20% closer. Though when compared to M13, M92 is only slightly less bright, but about 1/3 less extended. It is visible to the naked eye under very good viewing conditions. With a small telescope, M92 can be seen as a nebulous smudge even in a severely light-polluted sky, and can be further resolved in darker conditions.

== Characteristics ==
It is also one of the galaxy's oldest clusters. It is around 16×10^{3} ly (4.9 kpc) above/below the galactic plane and 33×10^{3} ly (10 kpc) from the Galactic Center. It is about 26,700 light-years away from the Solar System.The half-light radius, or radius containing the upper half of its light emission, is 1.09 arcminutes (′), while the tidal radius, the broadest standard measure, is 15.17′. It appears only slightly flattened: its minor axis is about 89% ± 3% of the major.

Characteristic of other globulars, it has little of the elements other than hydrogen and helium; astronomers term this low metallicity. Specifically, relative to the Sun, its iron abundance is [Fe/H] = –2.32 dex, which is 0.5% of 1.0, on this logarithmic scale, the solar abundance. This puts the estimated age range for the cluster at 11 ± 1.5 billion years.

Its true diameter is 108 ly, and may have a mass corresponding to 330,000 suns.

The cluster is not yet in, nor guaranteed to undergo, core collapse and the core radius figures as about 2 arcseconds (″). It is an Oosterhoff type II (OoII) globular cluster, which means it belongs to the group of metal-poor clusters with longer period RR Lyrae variable stars. The 1997 Catalogue of Variable Stars in Globular Clusters listed 28 candidate variable stars in the cluster, although only 20 have been confirmed. As of 2001, there are 17 known RR Lyrae variables in Messier 92. 10 X-ray sources have been detected within the 1.02 arcminute half-mass radius of the cluster, of which half are candidate cataclysmic variable stars.

M92 is approaching us at 112 km/sec. Its coordinates indicate that the Earth's North Celestial Pole periodically passes less than one degree of this cluster during the precession of Earth's axis. Thus, M92 was a "Polarissima Borealis", or "North Cluster", about 12,000 years ago (10,000 BC), and it will again in about 14,000 years (16,000 AD).

The multiple stellar populations in this cluster, revealing that it hosts at least two stellar generations of stars named 1G and 2G, as well as two distinct groups of 2G stars (2GA and 2GB). The helium abundances of 2GA and 2GB stars have higher mass fractions than that of the 1G stars by 0.01 and 0.04, respectively.

== Gallery ==
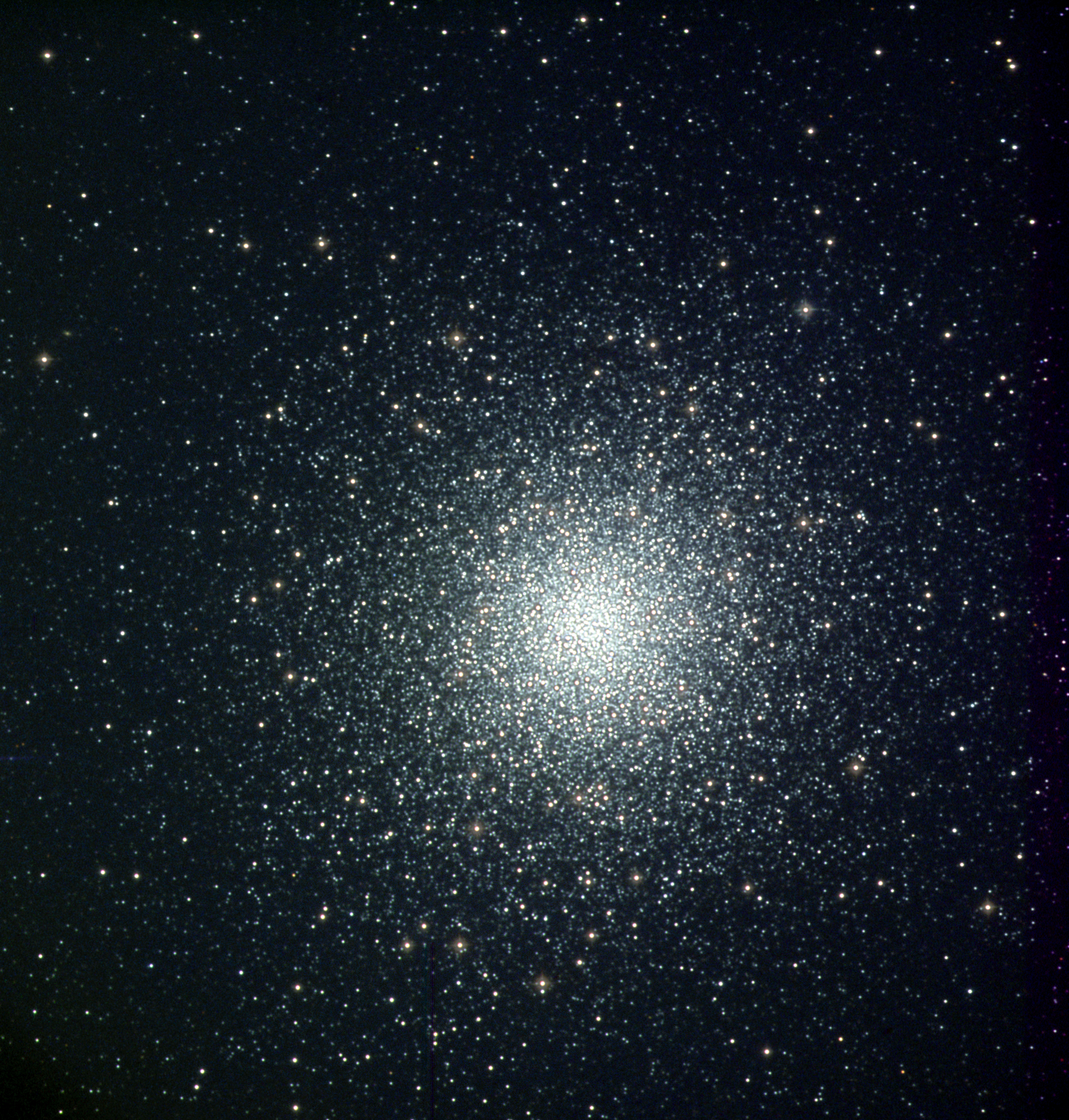
Messier 92 - wide field view from the Isaac Newton Group of Telescopes

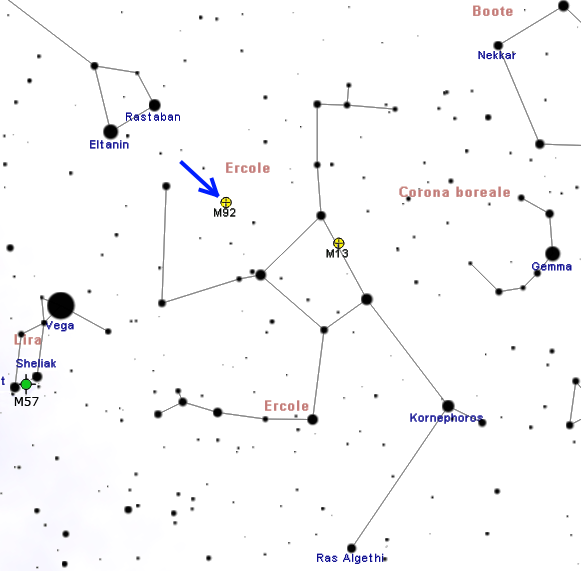
Map showing how Messier 92 figures in the two-dimensional sky, in the east of Hercules. Maps set by convention against a southern horizon, such that east is left.

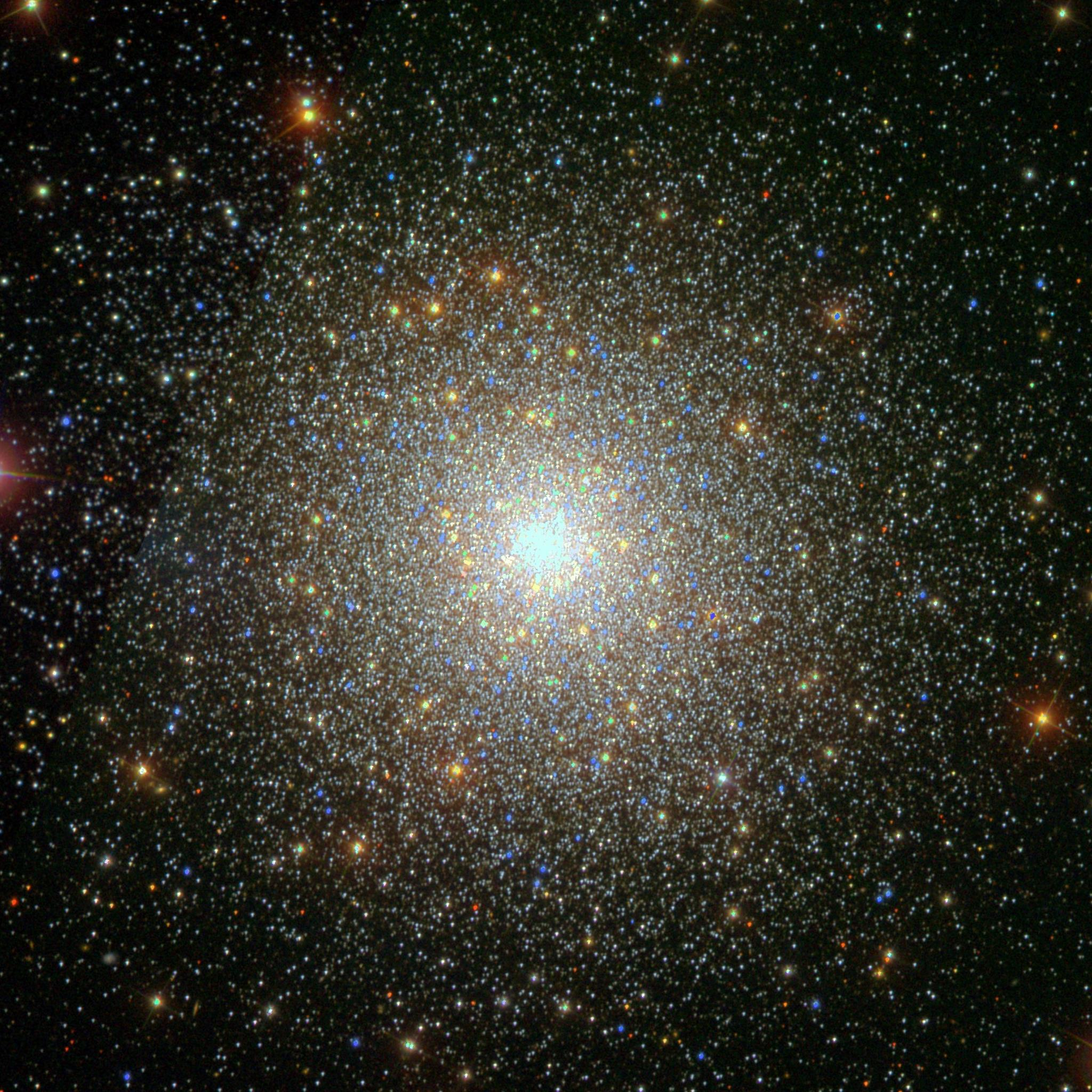
Messier 92 by the Sloan Digital Sky Survey

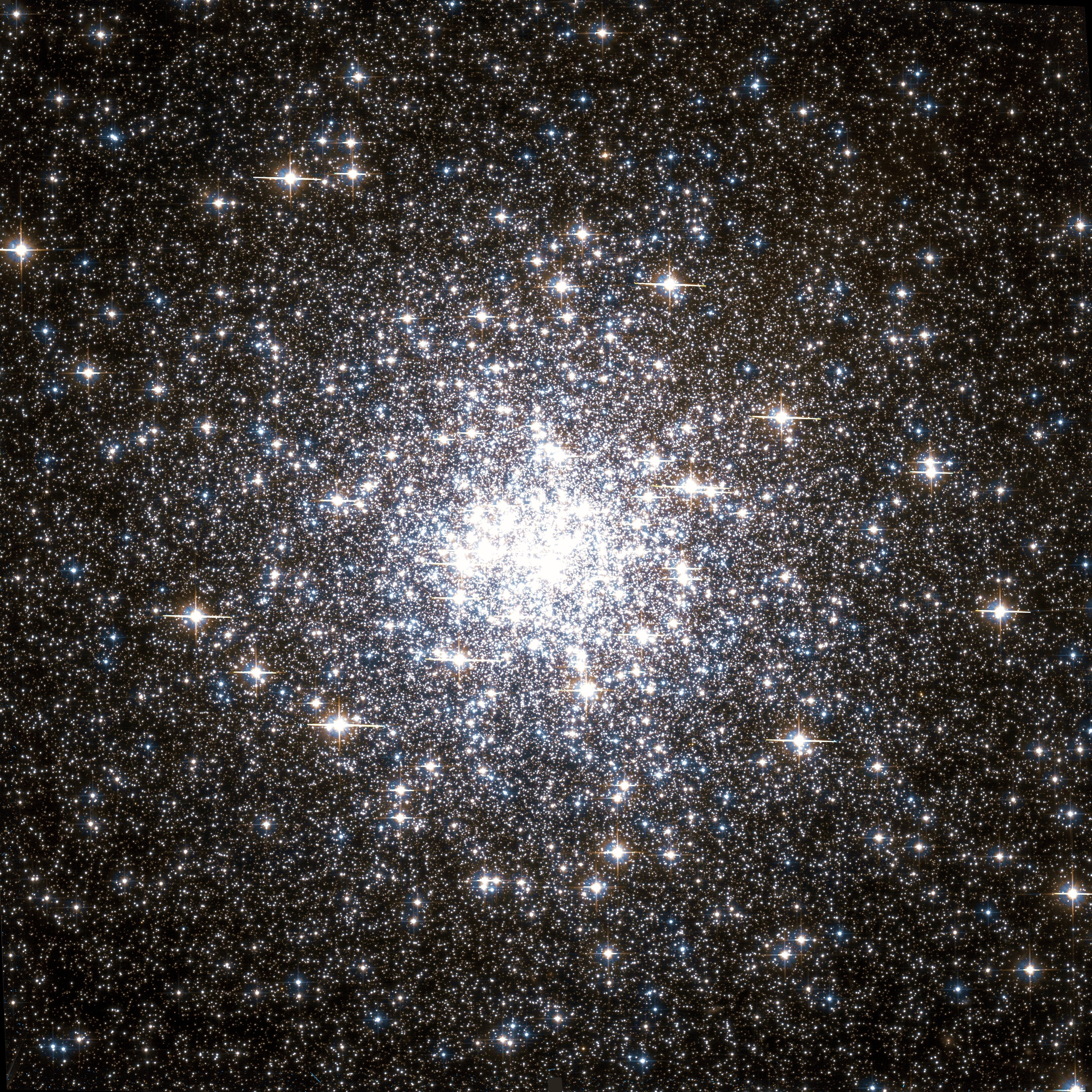
Messier 92 by HST; 3.5′ view

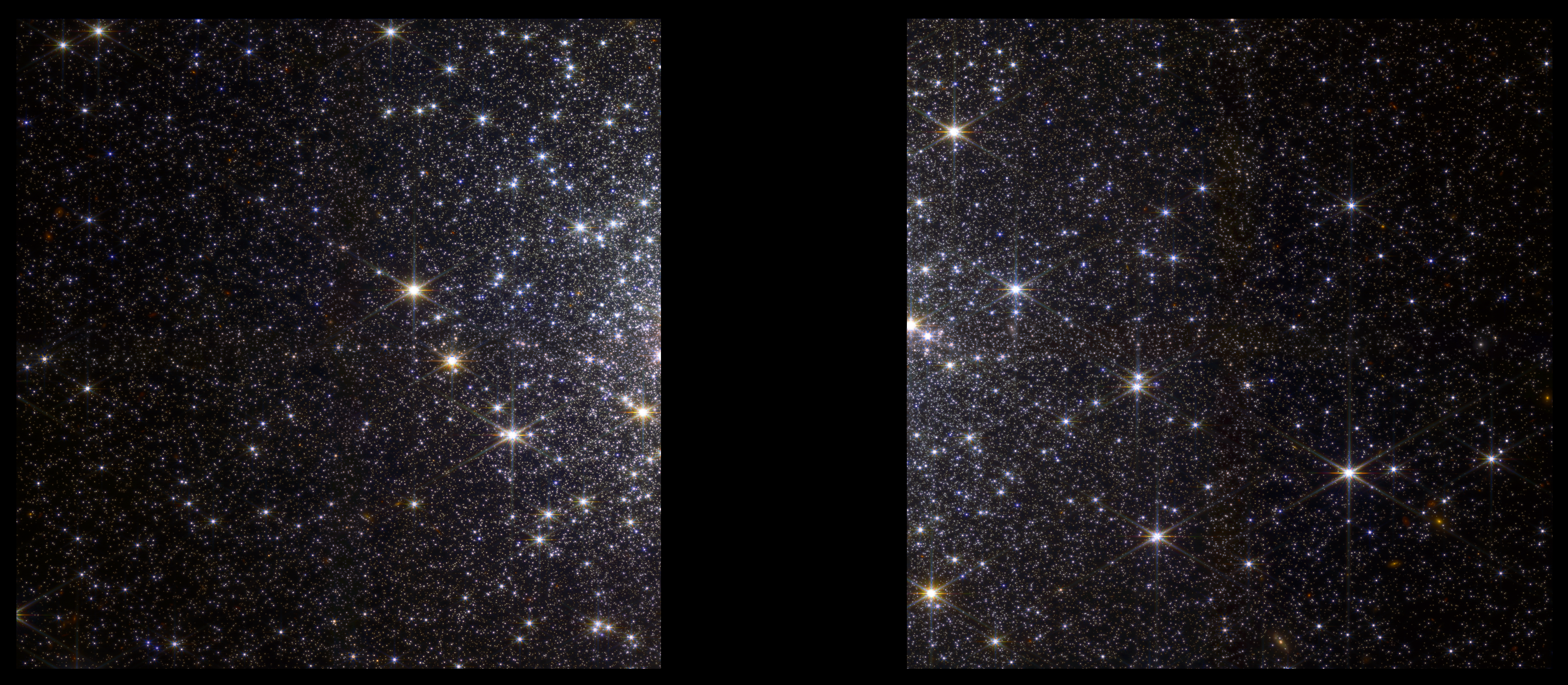
Messier 92 captured by the James Webb Space Telescope’s NIRCam instrument

== See also ==
- List of Messier objects
