= Ariaethus of Tegea =

Ancient Greek writer

Ariaethus or Araethus (Ancient Greek: Ἀρίαιθος, Ariaithos or Araithos) was a writer from the ancient Greek city-state of Tegea, whose work survives in fragments. The most notable known work by this author was Arkadika, which focused on local myths in Arcadia. This also includes myths dealing with local affairs in Tegea. The date of his writing is unknown, but it has been suggested that he wrote either in the 4th century BC or the 3rd century BC. Madeleine Jost and James Roy propose the Hellenistic period to be the most likely due to the inclusion of Aeneas in one of the fragments. It is uncertain whether his work included later Arcadian history as well as the mythical past. His account is unique in that it is an account of Arcadian traditions by an Arcadian writer, making the fragments of his work essential for our understanding of Arcadian history.

== Fragments ==
- Fragment 1 survives in the work of Dionysius of Halicarnassus and mentions that Aeneas lived in Arcadian Orchomenus.
- Fragments 2a and 2b survive in the work of Hyginus and focuses on the story of Zeus and Callisto as the parents of the regional eponymous hero Arcas His account differs from others in making Callisto the daughter of Ceteus instead of Lykaon, and by calling Arcas' mother Megisto instead of Callisto. This may reflect a local Tegean version, as Ceteus may have been the eponymous hero of the Cetians in Mysia. These are connected to the local Tegean hero Telephus.
- Fragment 3 deals with the nymph Cyrene; why this nymph is attached to the region of Arcadia is challenging to assess.
- Fragment 4 deals with the birth of the Arcadian god Pan and makes him a son of Aither and Oinoe, Aither being a local name for the father of Zeus, and Oinoe a local Tegean nymph, and the nurse of Zeus in local traditions. This would then make Zeus and Pan the same age.
- Fragment 5 deals with the horse Arion, which Ar(i)aithos proposes Heracles rode on and was later gifted to Adrastus.
- Fragment 6 mentions the origin of the Maraphians, a people within the Achaemenid Empire.
- Fragments 7, 7a, and 7b deals with the fighting between the Pylians and Arcadians.
- Fragment 8 refers to Hera blinding Tiresias, an event which took place at Mount Cyllene in Arcadia
- Marco Pearle and Stafano Vecchiato propose an additional fragment from the papyrus P. Oxy. 5049. This fragment refers to a mythical character called Phylonome, and may correspond with the character of the same name in Plutarch's Greek and Roman Parallel Stories, as a daughter of Nyctimus and lover of Ares.

== Bibliography ==
- Dowden, K. (1989) Death and the Maiden: Girls Initiation Rights in Greek Myth London: Routledge.
- Hejnic, J. (1961) Pausanias the Perieget and the Archaic History of Arcadia , Prague:
- Jost, M. and Roy, J. (2010). "Ar (i) A.thos av Tegea (316) ". In Jacoby Online. Brills New Jacoby, part III, edited by Ian Worthington. Brill: Leiden. http://dx.doi.org.bris.idm.oclc.org/10.1163/1873-5363_bnj_a316
- Nielsen, T.H. (2002) Arkadia and Its Poleis in the Archaic and Classical Periods, Göttingen: Vandenhoeck & Ruprecht.
- Pearle, M. and Vecchiato, S. (2015) "More about P. Oxy 5094: Hecuba's Father, Stesichorus, and a New Fragment of Ar (i) aethus of Tegea", Zeitschrift für Papyrologie und Epigraphik, 194, 11-27
