= Hercules (constellation) =

Constellation in the northern celestial hemisphere

- Constellation
- List of stars in Hercules
- Abbreviation: Her
- Genitive: Herculis
- Pronunciation: /ˈhɜːrkjʊliːz/, genitive /ˈhɜːrkjʊlɪs/
- Symbolism: Heracles
- Right ascension: 17^{h}
- Declination: +30°
- Quadrant: NQ3
- Area: 1225 sq. deg. (5th)
- Main stars: 14, 22
- Bayer/Flamsteed stars: 102
- Stars brighter than 3.00^{m}: 2
- Stars within 10.00 pc (32.62 ly): 9
- Brightest star: β Her (Kornephoros) (2.78^{m})
- Nearest star: WISE 1741+2553
- Messier objects: 2
- Meteor showers: Tau Herculids
- Bordering constellations: Draco; Boötes; Corona Borealis; Serpens Caput; Ophiuchus; Aquila; Sagitta; Vulpecula; Lyra
- Visible at latitudes between +90° and −39°. Best visible at 21:00 (9 p.m.) during the month of July.

Hercules is a constellation named after Hercules, the Roman mythological hero adapted from the Greek hero Heracles. Hercules was one of the 48 constellations listed by the second-century astronomer Ptolemy, and it remains one of the 88 modern constellations today. It is the fifth-largest of the modern constellations and is the largest of the 50 which have no stars brighter than apparent magnitude +2.5.

== Characteristics ==
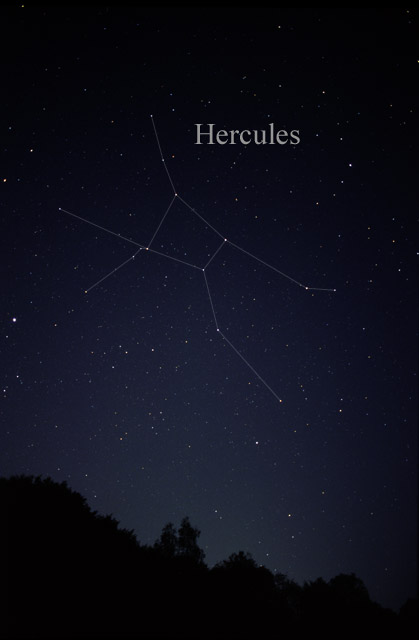
The constellation Hercules as it may appear to the naked eye.

Hercules is bordered by Draco to the north; Boötes, Corona Borealis, and Serpens Caput to the west; Ophiuchus to the south; Aquila to the southwest; and Sagitta, Vulpecula, and Lyra to the east. Covering 1225.1 square degrees and 2.970% of the night sky, it ranks fifth among the 88 constellations in size. The three-letter abbreviation for the constellation, as adopted by the International Astronomical Union in 1922, is 'Her'. The official constellation boundaries, as set by Eugène Delporte in 1930, are defined by a polygon of 32 segments (illustrated in infobox). In the equatorial coordinate system, epoch 2000, the right ascension coordinates of these borders lie between 16^{h} 00^{m} 26.64^{s} and 18^{h} 57^{m} 49.50^{s}, while the declination coordinates are between +3.67° and +51.32°. In mid-northern latitudes, Hercules is best observed from mid-spring until early autumn, culminating at midnight on June 13.

The solar apex is the direction of the open motion with respect to the Local Standard of Rest. This is located within the constellation of Hercules, around coordinates right ascension 18^{h} 00^{m} and declination 30° 00′. The north pole of the supergalactic coordinate system is located within this constellation at right ascension 18^{h} 55^{m} 01^{s} and declination +15° 42′ 32″.

== Features ==
=== Stars ===
Hercules has no first or second magnitude stars. However, it does have several stars above magnitude 4. Alpha Herculis, traditionally called Rasalgethi, is a triple star system, partly resolvable in small amateur telescopes, 359 light-years from Earth. Its common name means "the kneeler's head". The primary is an irregular variable star; it is a bright giant with a minimum magnitude of 4 and a maximum magnitude of 3. It has a diameter of roughly 400 solar diameters. The secondary, a spectroscopic binary that orbits the primary every 3600 years, is a blue-green hued star of magnitude 5.6. Five degrees east-south-east of Rasalgethi lies Rasalhague, the brightest star in Ophiuchus. These stars may be among the closest-lying pair of alpha stars in the entire sky. Despite the star designated as "alpha", it is actually the 5th brightest star in Hercules.

Beta Herculis, also called Kornephoros, is the brightest star in Hercules. It is a yellow giant of magnitude 2.8, 148 light-years from Earth; kornephoros means club-bearer. Delta Herculis A is a double star divisible in small amateur telescopes. The primary is a blue-white star of magnitude 3.1, and is 78 light-years from Earth. The optical companion is of magnitude 8.2. Gamma Herculis is also a double star divisible in small amateur telescopes. The primary is a white giant of magnitude 3.8, 195 light-years from Earth. The optical companion, widely separated, is 10th magnitude. Zeta Herculis is a binary star that is becoming divisible in medium-aperture amateur telescopes, as the components widen to their peak in 2025. The system, 35 light-years from Earth, has a period of 34.5 years. The primary is a yellow-tinged star of magnitude 2.9 and the secondary is an orange star of magnitude 5.7.

The constellation Hercules showing the IAU boundaries and the constellation stick figure. Astrophotograph by Eckhard Slawik, from NOIRLab's 88 Constellations project.

Hercules hosts further quite bright double stars and binary stars. Kappa Herculis is a double star divisible in small amateur telescopes. The primary is a yellow giant of magnitude 5.0, 388 light-years from Earth; the secondary is an orange giant of magnitude 6.3, 470 light-years from Earth. Rho Herculis is a binary star 402 light-years from Earth, divisible in small amateur telescopes. Both components are blue-green giant stars; the primary is magnitude 4.5 and the secondary is magnitude 5.5. 95 Herculis is a binary star divisible in small telescopes, 470 light-years from Earth. The primary is a silvery giant of magnitude 4.9, and the secondary is an old, reddish giant star of magnitude 5.2. The star HD164669 near the primary may be an optical double. 100 Herculis is a double star easily divisible in small amateur telescopes. Both components are magnitude 5.8 blue-white stars; they are 165 and 230 light-years from Earth.

There are several dimmer variable stars in Hercules. 30 Herculis, also called g Herculis, is a semiregular red giant with a period of 3 months. 361 light-years from Earth, it has a minimum magnitude of 6.3 and a maximum magnitude of 4.3. 68 Herculis, also called u Herculis, is a Beta Lyrae-type eclipsing binary star. 865 light-years from Earth, it has a period of 2 days; its minimum magnitude is 5.4 and its maximum magnitude is 4.7.

Mu Herculis is 27.4 light-years from Earth. The solar apex, i.e., the point on the sky which marks the direction that the Sun is moving in its orbit around the center of the Milky Way, narrowly figures in Hercules, between Hercules' left elbow (near Omicron Herculis) and Vega (in neighboring Lyra).

=== Planetary systems ===
Fifteen stars in Hercules are known to be orbited by extrasolar planets.

- 14 Herculis has two planets. The planet 14 Herculis b had the longest period (4.9 years) and widest orbit (2.8 AU) at the time of discovery. The planet 14 Herculis c orbits much further out with very low eccentricity. It was discovered in 2005 but was only confirmed in 2021.
- HD 149026 has a transiting hot Jupiter planet.
- HD 154345 has the planet HD 154345 b, a long period (9.095 years) and wide orbit (4.18 AU).
- HD 164922 has the first long period Saturn-like planet discovered. The mass is 0.36 M_{J} and semimajor axis of 2.11 AU. More planets have been discovered since.
- HD 147506 has the most massive transiting planet HAT-P-2b at the time of discovery. The mass is 8.65 M_{J}.
- HD 155358 has two planets around the lowest metallicity planet-harboring star (21% Sun). Both planets orbit in mild eccentricities.
- GSC 03089-00929 has a short transiting planet TrES-3b. The period was 31 hours.
- Gliese 649 has a saturnian planet around the red dwarf star.
- HD 156668 has an Earth mass planet with a minimum mass of four Earth masses.
- HD 164595 is a G-type star with one known planet, HD 164595 b.
- TOI-561 has four, or possibly five planets. The innermost of which, TOI-561 b, is notable because it is an ultra-short period planet.

=== Deep-sky objects ===
Hercules contains two bright globular clusters: M13, the brightest globular cluster in the northern hemisphere, and M92. It also contains the nearly spherical planetary nebula Abell 39. M13 lies between the stars η Her and ζ Her; it is dim, but may be detected by the unaided eye on a very clear night.

M13, visible to both the naked eye and binoculars, is a globular cluster of the 6th magnitude that contains more than 300,000 stars and is 25,200 light-years from Earth. It is also very large, with an apparent diameter of over 0.25 degrees, half the size of the full moon; its physical diameter is more than 100 light-years. Individual stars in M13 are resolvable in a small amateur telescope.

M92 is a globular cluster of magnitude 6.4, 26,000 light-years from earth. It is a Shapley class IV cluster, indicating that it is quite concentrated at the center; it has a very clear nucleus. M92 is visible as a fuzzy star in binoculars, like M13; it is denser and smaller than the more celebrated cluster. The oldest globular cluster known at 14 billion years, its stars are resolvable in a medium-aperture amateur telescope.

NGC 6229 is a dimmer globular cluster, with a magnitude of 9.4, it is the third-brightest globular in the constellation. 100,000 light-years from Earth, it is a Shapley class IV cluster, meaning that it is fairly rich in the center and quite concentrated at the nucleus.

NGC 6210 is a planetary nebula of the 9th magnitude, 4000 light-years from Earth visible as a blue-green elliptical disk in amateur telescopes larger than 75 mm in aperture.

AT2018cow, a large astronomical explosion detected on 16 June 2018. As of 22 June 2018, this astronomical event has generated a very large amount of interest among astronomers throughout the world and may be, as of 22 June 2018, considered a supernova tentatively named Supernova 2018cow.

The Hercules Cluster (Abell 2151) is a cluster of galaxies in Hercules.

The brightest radio source in the constellation is Hercules A, an elliptical galaxy located 2.1 billion light years away with a supermassive black hole with a mass of 2.5-billion-solar-mass that has radio jets that extend for one-and-a-half million light-years. Another bright radio source in Hercules is the quasar 3C 345 which has a jet that appears to move faster than the speed of light.

The Hercules–Corona Borealis Great Wall, the largest structure in the universe, is in Hercules.

== Visualizations ==
=== Traditional ===
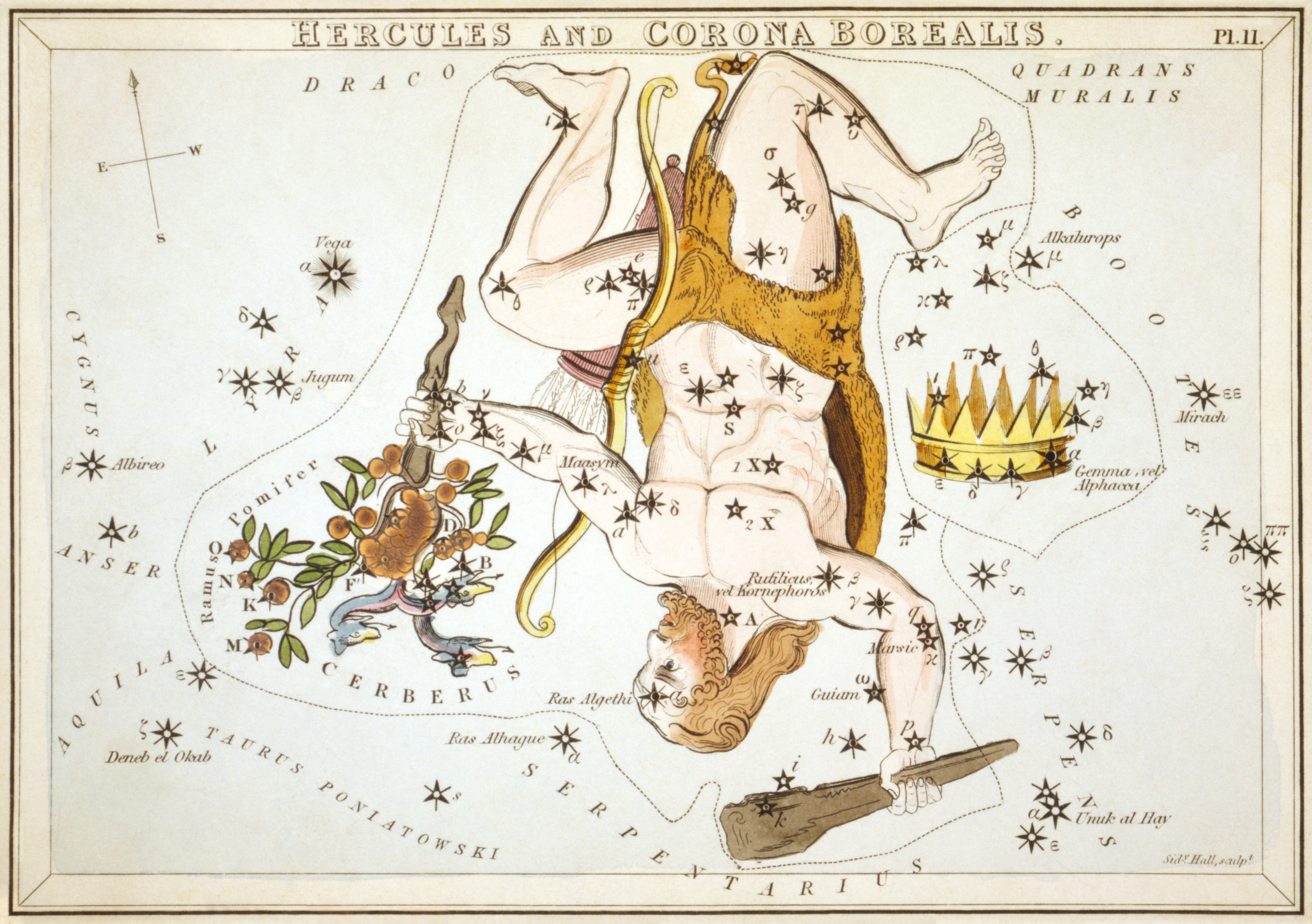
Hercules as depicted in Urania's Mirror, a set of constellation cards published in London c.1825. The figure appears upside down in the sky relative to neighbouring constellations. The former constellation of Cerberus is held by Hercules before its stars were part of the constellation.

The traditional visualization imagines α Herculis as Hercules's head; its name, Rasalgethi, literally means "head of the kneeling one". Hercules's left hand then points toward Lyra from his shoulder (δ Herculis), and β Herculis, or Kornephoros ("club-bearer") forms his other shoulder. His narrow waist is formed by ε Herculis and ζ Herculis. His right leg is kneeling. Finally, his left leg (with θ Herculis as the knee and ι Herculis the foot) is stepping on Draco's head, the dragon/snake whom Hercules has vanquished and perpetually gloats over for eternities.

=== Keystone asterism ===
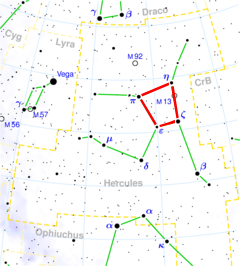
The Keysone asterism

A common form found in modern star charts uses the quadrangle formed by π Her, η Her, ζ Her and ε Her (known as the "Keystone" asterism) as the lower half (abdomen) of Hercules's torso.

=== H.A. Rey ===
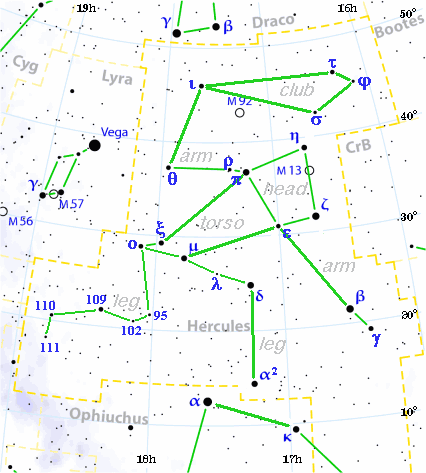
An alternative way to connect the stars of the constellation Hercules, suggested by H.A. Rey. Here, Hercules is shown with his head at the top.

H. A. Rey has suggested an alternative visualization in which the "Keystone" becomes Hercules's head. This quadrangle lies between two very bright stars: Vega in the constellation Lyra and α CrB (Alphecca) in the constellation Corona Borealis. The hero's right leg contains two bright stars of the third magnitude: α Her (Rasalgethi) and δ Her (Sarin). The latter is the right knee. The hero's left leg contains dimmer stars of the fourth magnitude which do not have Bayer designations but which do have Flamsteed numbers. The star β Her belongs to the hero's outstretched right hand, and is also called Kornephoros.

== History ==
According to Gavin White, the Greek constellation of Hercules may be a distorted version of the Babylonian constellation known as the "Standing Gods" (MUL.DINGIR.GUB.BA.MESH). White argues that this figure was, like the similarly named "Sitting Gods", depicted as a man with a serpent's body instead of legs (the serpent element now being represented on the Greek star map by the figure of Draco that Hercules crushes beneath his feet). He further argues that the original name of Hercules – the 'Kneeler' (see below) – is a conflation of the two Babylonian constellations of the Sitting and Standing Gods. Alternatively, it is possible that a large part of Hercules comprised another Babylonian constellation, the Sitting Dog (MUL.UR.GI).

The constellation is also sometimes associated with Gilgamesh, a Sumerian mythological hero. Phoenician tradition is said to have associated this constellation with their sun god, who slew a dragon (Draco).

The earliest Greek references to the constellation do not refer to it as Hercules. Aratus describes it as follows:

Right there in its [Draco's] orbit wheels a Phantom form, like to a man that strives at a task. That sign no man knows how to read clearly, nor what task he is bent, but men simply call him On His Knees. [Ἐγγόνασιν "the Kneeler"].

Now that Phantom, that toils on his knees, seems to sit on bended knee, and from both his shoulders his hands are upraised and stretch, one this way, one that, a fathom's length. Over the middle of the head of the crooked Dragon, he has the tip of his right foot. Here too that Crown [Corona], which glorious Dionysus set to be memorial of the dead Ariadne, wheels beneath the back of the toil-spent Phantom. To the Phantom's back the Crown is near, but by his head mark near at hand the head of Ophiuchus [...] Yonder, too, is the tiny Tortoise, which, while still beside his cradle, Hermes pierced for strings and bade it be called the Lyre [Lyra]: and he brought it into heaven and set it in front of the unknown Phantom. That Croucher on his Knees comes near the Lyre with his left knee, but the top of the Bird's head wheels on the other side, and between the Bird's head and the Phantom's knee is enstarred the Lyre.

The constellation is connected with Hercules in De astronomia (probably 1st century BCE/CE, and attributed to Hyginus), which describes several different myths about the constellation:

- Eratosthenes (3rd century BCE) is said to have described it as Hercules, placed above Draco (representing the dragon of the Hesperides) and preparing to fight it, holding his lion's skin in his left hand, and a club in his right (this can be found in the Epitome Catasterismorum).
- Panyassis' Heracleia (5th century BCE) reportedly said Jupiter was impressed by this fight, and made it a constellation, with Hercules kneeling on his right knee, and trying to crush Draco's head with his left foot, while striking with his right hand and holding the lion skin in his left.
- Araethus (3rd/4th century BCE) is said to have described the constellation as depicting Ceteus son of Lycaon, imploring the gods to restore his daughter Megisto who had been transformed into a bear.
- Hegesianax (2nd/3rd century BCE), who it says describes it as Theseus lifting the stone at Troezen.
- Anacreon of Alexandria, who it claims also supports the idea that it depicts Theseus, saying that the constellation Lyra (said to be Theseus' lyre in other sources) is near Theseus.
- Thamyris blinded by the Muses, kneeling in supplication.
- Orpheus killed by the women of Thracia for seeing the sacred rituals of Liber (Dionysus).
- Aeschylus' lost play Prometheus Unbound (5th century BCE), which recounted that when Hercules drives the cattle of Geryon through Liguria (northern Italy), the Ligurians will join forces and attack him, attempting to steal the cattle. Hercules fights until his weapons break, before falling to his knees, wounded. Jupiter, taking pity on his son, provides many stones on the ground, which Hercules uses to fight off the Ligurians. In commemoration of this, Jupiter makes a constellation depicting Hercules in his fighting form. (A quote from this section of the play is preserved in Dionysius of Halicarnassus' Roman Antiquities: "And thou shalt come to Liguria's dauntless host, Where no fault shalt thou find, bold though thou art, With the fray: 'tis fated thy missiles all shall fail.")
- Ixion with his arms bound for trying to attack Juno.
- Prometheus bound on Mount Caucasus.

The Scholia to Aratus mention three more mythical figures in connection with this constellation: Sisyphus or Tantalus, who suffered in Tartarus for having offended the gods, or Salmoneus, who was struck down by Zeus for his hubris. Another classical author associated the constellation with Atlas.

== Equivalents ==
In Chinese astronomy, the stars that correspond to Hercules are located in two areas: the Purple Forbidden enclosure (紫微垣, Zǐ Wēi Yuán) and the Heavenly Market enclosure (天市垣, Tiān Shì Yuán).

Arab translators of Ptolemy named it in Arabic: الرقيس, romanized: al-raqis, lit. 'the player' (not to be confused with Arabic: الراقص, romanized: al-rāqiṣ, lit. 'the trotting (camel), the dancing one'), the name for the star Mu Draconis. Hence its Swahili name Rakisi.

== See also ==
- Hercules (Chinese astronomy)
