= List of exoplanets discovered in 2020 =

This list of exoplanets discovered in 2020 is a list of confirmed exoplanets that were first observed in 2020.

For exoplanets detected only by radial velocity, the listed value for mass is a lower limit. See Minimum mass for more information.

Name	Mass (M_{J})	Radius (R_{J})	Period (days)	Semi-major axis (AU)	Temp. (K)	Discovery method	Distance (ly)	Host star mass (M_{☉})	Host star temp. (K)	Remarks
2MASS J1155-7919 b	10			582		imaging	330			Very young Super-Jupiter on unusually wide orbit.
AU Microscopii b	0.054±0.015	0.371±0.016	8.463000±0.000002	0.0645±0.0013	593±21	transit	31.718±0.015	0.50±0.03	3700±100	
AU Microscopii c	0.007 – 0.079	0.295±0.014	18.859019±0.000016	0.1101±0.0022	454±16	transit	31.718±0.015	0.50±0.03	3700±100	Precise radial velocities of giant stars
BD-11 4672 c	0.04837^{+0.00935}_{−0.00884}		74.2^{+0.06}_{−0.08}	0.30±0.01		radial vel.	88.63±0.11	0.651^{+0.031}_{−0.029}	4550±110	Habitable zone, highly eccentric orbit.
CD Ceti b	0.0124^{+0.0013}_{−0.0014}		2.29070±0.00012	0.0185^{+0.0013}_{−0.0013}	464±18	radial vel.	28.07	0.161±0.010	3130±51	
CFHTWIR-Oph 98 b	7.8^{+0.7}_{−0.8}	1.86±0.04	8,040,000±470,000	200	1800±40	imaging	447±13	0.015±0.0008	2320±40	Very young superjovian planet orbiting a brown dwarf known as 2MASS J16274422-2358521
Chi Scorpii b	4.32^{+0.15}_{−0.12}		578.38^{+2.01}_{−2.09}	1.45^{+0.02}_{−0.02}		radial vel.	378.3^{+16}_{−15}	1.22^{+0.13}_{−0.14}	4157^{+11}_{−10}	Giant star host
CoRoT-30 b	2.90±0.22	1.009±0.076	9.06005±0.00024	0.0844±0.0012		transit	3130^{+220}_{−130}	0.98^{+0.03}_{−0.05}	5650±100	
CoRoT-31 b	0.84±0.34	1.46±0.30	4.62941±0.00075	0.0586±0.0034		transit	7140±2300	1.25^{+0.22}_{−0.21}	5700±120	
EPIC 201085153 b		0.214±0.089	0.25722±0.000039			transit			3945±386	Extremely tight orbit
EPIC 201085153 c		0.125^{+0.179}_{−0.125}	2.259797±0.0008			transit			3945±386	
EPIC 201170410 b	0.00362	0.09341^{+0.0246}_{−0.0229}	6.7987±0.0001	0.0349^{+0.0027}_{−0.0022}		transit	437^{+149}_{−130}	0.287^{+0.101}_{−0.084}	3648^{+172}_{−143}	
EPIC 201650711 c		0.036±0.007	5.544059±0.00016			transit	298.8±1.7		4310±92	Ternary star system, and planet b unconfirmed
EPIC 201757695 b	0.00217	0.08101^{+0.0052}_{−0.0057}	2.0478±0.0001	0.0296±0.0005		transit	1880±110	0.727^{+0.044}_{−0.053}	4520^{+108}_{−54}	
EPIC 205152172 b		0.107±0.018	0.980088±0.000026			transit	517±2	0.669±0.016	4202±242	Candidate since 2016
EPIC 206298289 b		0.078±0.009	0.434847±0.000022			transit	492±6		3875±157	Candidate since 2016
EPIC 210801536 b		0.088±0.027	0.892592±0.00012			transit			5304±259	Candidate since 2019, one more planet candidate in system
EPIC 220440058 b		0.125±0.036	0.626683±0.00005			transit			3682±217	One more planet candidate in system
EPIC 249893012 b	0.02753±0.00343	0.174±0.008	3.5951±0.0003	0.047^{+0.005}_{−0.007}	1616^{+150}_{−80}	transit	1059.03±13.69857	1.05±0.05	5430±85	
EPIC 249893012 c	0.04616±0.00595	0.3274^{+0.0152}_{−0.0125}	15.624±0.001	0.13^{+0.01}_{−0.02}	990^{+68}_{−29}	transit	1059.03±13.69857	1.05±0.05	5430±85	
EPIC 249893012 d	0.03203^{+0.00774}_{−0.00761}	0.3515±0.0116	35.747±0.005	0.22^{+0.02}_{−0.04}	752^{+69}_{−37}	transit	1059.03±13.69857	1.05±0.05	5430±85	
GJ 1061 b	0.00431^{+0.00050}_{−0.00047}	0.098	3.204±0.001	0.021±0.001		radial vel.	11.98±0.003	0.12±0.01	2953±98	Potentially rocky world, larger than Earth
GJ 1061 c	0.00547±0.00072	0.105	6.689±0.005	0.035±0.001		radial vel.	11.98±0.003	0.12±0.01	2953±98	Potentially rocky world, larger than Earth
GJ 1061 d	0.00516^{+0.00076}_{−0.00072}	0.104	13.031^{+0.025}_{−0.032}	0.054±0.001		radial vel.	11.98±0.003	0.12±0.01	2953±98	Potentially rocky world, larger than Earth
GJ 1252 b	0.0042±0.0009	0.105±0.007	0.5182349^{+0.0000063}_{−0.0000050}	0.00915±0.00015	1410^{+91}_{−125}	transit	66.49±0.06	0.381±0.019	3458^{+140}_{−133}	Hot rocky planet with no atmosphere, larger than Earth
GJ 2056 b	0.0510±0.011	0.372	69.971±0.061	0.283±0.0013		radial vel.	92.8	0.62±0.08		Neptune-like ice giant in the habitable zone
GJ 3082 b	0.02759^{+0.011}_{−0.01334}	0.249	11.949±0.022	0.079^{+0.006}_{−0.007}		radial vel.	54.2	0.47		Neptune-like ice giant.
GJ 3473 b	0.0059±0.0009	0.113^{+0.0045}_{−0.0044}	1.1980035^{+0.0000018}_{−0.0000019}	0.01589±0.00062	773^{+16}_{−15}	transit	89.29±0.13	0.360±0.016	3347±54	Potentially rocky world, larger than Earth, also called TOI-488 b
GJ 3473 c	0.0233^{+0.0029}_{−0.0027}	0.235	15.509±0.033	0.0876^{+0.0035}_{−0.0034}	329.1^{+6.6}_{−6.4}	radial vel.	89.29±0.13	0.360±0.016	3347±54	Neptune-like ice giant also called TOI-488 c
GJ 9689 b	0.0304±0.00444	0.274	18.27^{+0.01}_{−0.01}	0.1139±0.0039	413.88-492.19	radial vel.	100	0.59±0.06	3836±69	Neptune-like ice giant.
Gliese 180 d	0.0236^{+0.00837}_{−0.00733}	0.237	106.341^{+0.261}_{−0.34}	0.31^{+0.024}_{−0.029}		radial vel.	39.96±0.01	0.43	3371	Neptune-like ice giant.
Gliese 251 b	0.0126^{+0.00126}_{−0.00126}	0.163	14.238^{+0.002}_{−0.002}	0.0818^{+0.0011}_{−0.0012}	351^{+1.4}_{−1.3}	radial vel.	18.205±0.006	0.360±0.015	3451±51	Potentially rocky world, larger than earth. False positive in 2019, rediscovered in 2020
Gliese 317 c	1.664^{+0.118}_{−0.166}	1.2	6718.777^{+375.180}_{−282.469}			radial vel.	49.25±0.72	0.42±0.05	3510±50	Gas giant
Gliese 414 Ab	0.029^{+0.010}_{−0.008}	0.263^{+0.099}_{−0.081}	50.817^{+0.031}_{−0.03}	0.24±0.01	303.7±32.5	radial vel.	38.8	0.650±0.08	4120±109	Planets orbiting primary star of binary system. Gl 414A is also known as HD 97101 and HIP 54646.
Gliese 414 Ac	0.177^{+0.033}_{−0.031}	0.784^{+0.360}_{−0.238}	748.3^{+1.3}_{−1.2}	1.43±0.06	123.3±13.2	radial vel.	38.8	0.650±0.08	4120±109	Planets orbiting primary star of binary system. Gl 414A is also known as HD 97101 and HIP 54646.
Gliese 433 d	0.01643±0.00290	0.191	36.052^{+0.045}_{−0.031}	0.178^{+0.013}_{−0.015}		radial vel.	29.57±0.01	0.48	3600	Neptune-like ice giant.
Gliese 480 b	0.042±0.005	0.33	9.567±0.005	0.068±0.001		radial vel.	46.4	0.45±0.02		Neptune-like ice giant.
Gliese 687 c	0.0503±0.013	0.369	727.562±12.198	1.165±0.023		radial vel.	14.83	0.40±0.02		Second Neptune-like ice giant discovered in this system.
HAT-P-68b	0.724±0.043	1.072±0.012	2.29840551±0.00000052	0.02996^{+0.00043}_{−0.00012}	1027.8±8.2	transit	662±3	0.6785^{+0.0299}_{−0.0079}	4514±50	Gas giant.
HATS-37A b	0.099±0.042	0.606±0.016	4.3315366±0.0000041	0.04913^{+0.00033}_{−0.00023}	1085^{+16}_{−12}	transit	688.5±8.2	0.843^{+0.017}_{−0.012}	5247±50	Hot Neptune-like gas giant with one more red dwarf in system
HATS-38 b	0.074±0.011	0.614±0.0176	4.375021±0.000010	0.05036^{+0.00030}_{−0.00023}	1294±10	transit	1134±17	0.890^{+0.016}_{−0.012}	5740±50	Hot Neptune-like gas giant.
HATS-47 b	0.369^{+0.031}_{−0.021}	1.117±0.014	3.9228038±0.0000022	0.04269^{+0.00033}_{−0.00025}	852.9±4.7	transit	984.01±6.20	0.674^{+0.016}_{−0.012}	4479±51	Warm gas giant also known as TOI-1073b.
HATS-48 A b	0.243^{+0.022}_{−0.030}	0.800±0.0015	3.1316666±0.000037	0.03769±0.00011	954.6±4.8	transit	865.6±5.5	0.7279±0.0066	4190±100	Warm gas giant.
HATS-49 b	0.353^{+0.038}_{−0.027}	0.765±0.013	4.1480467±0.0000037	0.04515±0.00016	834.8±3.6	transit	1058.70±7.18	0.7133±0.0075	4354±70	Warm gas giant.
HATS-72 b	0.1254±0.0039	0.7224±0.0032	7.3279474±0.0000016	0.066517±0.000085	739.3±1.6	transit	416.37±1.70	0.7311±0.0028	4612±76	Warm gas giant, also known as WASP-191b or TOI-294b.
HD 11231 b	0.426^{+0.038}_{−0.052}		5.2072^{+0.0002}_{−0.0055}	0.0664±0.0005	1000	radial vel.	437.0495±13.04625	1.44±0.03	6500±100	DMPP-2 Found by Dispersed Matter Planet Project looking for hot ablating planets.
HD 25723 b	2.50^{+0.14}_{−0.17}		457.01^{+1.29}_{−1.31}	1.49^{+0.04}_{−0.05}		radial vel.	384.5^{+17.5}_{−16.1}	2.12^{+0.41}_{−0.55}	4766^{+49}_{−38}	Gas giant with a giant star host
HD 25723 c	1.34^{+0.08}_{−0.11}		2273.17^{+151.11}_{−116.33}	4.35^{+0.22}_{−0.03}		radial vel.	384.5^{+17.5}_{−16.1}	2.12^{+0.41}_{−0.55}	4766^{+49}_{−38}	Giant star host
HD 38677 b			18.57±0.01	0.1462±0.0012	877	radial vel.	202.2169±3.261564	1.21±0.03	6196±29	DMPP-1 Found by Dispersed Matter Planet Project looking for hot ablating planets.
HD 38677 c			6.584^{+0.003}_{−0.002}	0.0733^{+0.0006}_{−0.0007}	1239	radial vel.	202.2169±3.261564	1.21±0.03	6196±29	DMPP-1 Found by Dispersed Matter Planet Project looking for hot ablating planets, 2:1 orbital resonance of unconfirmed transiting planet.
HD 38677 d			2.882±0.001	0.0422^{+0.0004}_{−0.0003}	1632	radial vel.	202.2169±3.261564	1.21±0.03	6196±29	DMPP-1 Found by Dispersed Matter Planet Project looking for hot ablating planets.
HD 38677 e			5.516^{+0.002}_{−0.004}	0.0651±0.0005	1314	radial vel.	202.2169±3.261564	1.21±0.03	6196±29	DMPP-1 Found by Dispersed Matter Planet Project looking for hot ablating planets.
HD 42936 Ab	2.58^{+0.35}_{−0.58}		6.6732^{+0.0011}_{−0.0003}	0.0662±0.0013	854	radial vel.	159.4905±1.956938	0.87±0.05	5138±99	DMPP-3 Found by Dispersed Matter Planet Project looking for hot ablating planets.
HD 60292 b	6.5±1.0	1.13	495.4±3.0	1.5±0.1		radial vel.	1036±10	1.7±0.2	4348±28	Gas giant with a giant star host
HD 63433 b	0.017	0.192±0.0089	7.10801^{+0.00046}_{−0.00034}	0.0710^{+0.0033}_{−0.0041}		transit	73.08±0.07	0.99±0.03	5640±74	Young mini-Neptune losing mass at a rate of 0.35 Earth masses per billion years.
HD 63433 c	0.023	0.236±0.011	20.5455±0.001	0.1531^{+0.0074}_{−0.0092}		transit	73.08±0.07	0.99±0.03	5640±74	Young mini-Neptune losing mass at a rate of 0.11 Earth masses per billion years.
HD 79211 b	0.0334±0.004		24.422±0.014	0.142±0.005	345	radial vel.	20.658±0.005	0.64±0.07	4005±51	Orbiting primary star of binary ADS 7251
HD 80653 b	0.0180^{+0.0011}_{−0.0011}	0.1439±0.0063	0.719573±0.000021	0.01661±0.00019		transit	358.1197±2.641867	1.18±0.04	5959±61	Rocky super-Earth also known as K2-312b.
HD 81817 b	24.128^{+9.747}_{−0.691}	1.07	1021.20159^{+13.88370}_{−9.89130}	3.233^{+0.125}_{−0.131}		radial vel.	877.773^{+75.789}_{−64.791}	4.3±0.5	4140±55	Gas giant.
HD 86226 c	0.0228^{+0.0037}_{−0.0035}	0.193±0.007	3.98442±0.00018	0.049±0.001	1311±28	transit	148.6±0.4	1.019^{+0.061}_{−0.066}	5863±88	Sub-Neptune super-Earth.
HD 95338 b	0.1335^{+0.0070}_{−0.0065}	0.347^{+0.017}_{−0.018}	55.087^{+0.020}_{−0.020}	0.262^{+0.002}_{−0.002}	385^{+17}_{−17}	transit	120.6^{+0.1}_{−0.1}	0.83^{+0.02}_{−0.02}	5212^{+16}_{−11}	Gas giant.
HD108236 b	0.0102	0.1415±0.0087	3.79523^{+0.00047}_{−0.00044}	0.0469±0.0017	1099^{+19}_{−18}	transit	210±1	0.869^{+0.050}_{−0.048}	5660±61	Potentially rocky super-Earth.
HD108236 c	0.0155	0.1845^{+0.0089}_{−0.0081}	6.2037^{+0.00064}_{−0.00052}	0.0651±0.0024	932^{+17}_{−16}	transit	210±1	0.869^{+0.050}_{−0.048}	5660±61	Potentially rocky super-Earth
HD108236 d	0.0220	0.2423±0.0097	14.1756^{+0.001}_{−0.0011}	0.1131±0.004	708^{+13}_{−12}	transit	210±1	0.869^{+0.050}_{−0.048}	5660±61	Neptune-like exoplanet.
HD108236 e	0.0306	0.279^{+0.012}_{−0.011}	19.592±0.002	0.14±0.0052	636^{+12}_{−11}	transit	210±1	0.869^{+0.050}_{−0.048}	5660±61	Neptune-like exoplanet.
HD 112640 b	5.0±1.0	1.15	613.2±5.8	1.7±0.1		radial vel.	1065±6	1.8±0.2	4155±15	Gas giant with a giant star host
HD 136295 b	1.79±0.16		926.4±12.8	2.02±0.02		radial vel.	269.0±1.3	1.28^{+0.11}_{−0.10}	4891±50	Red giant host star also known as HIP 75092
HD 158259 b	0.00698^{+0.00123}_{−0.00142}	0.1146	2.17800^{+0.00009}_{−0.00010}			radial vel.	88.11±0.05	1.21^{+0.03}_{−0.08}	6068	Potentially rocky super-Earth.
HD 158259 c	0.0176^{+0.0019}_{−0.0019}	0.1989	3.43200^{+0.00030}_{−0.00016}			radial vel.	88.11±0.05	1.21^{+0.03}_{−0.08}	6068	Neptune-like.
HD 158259 d	0.0170^{+0.0023}_{−0.0022}	0.1945	5.1980814^{+0.0008186}_{−0.0008814}			radial vel.	88.11±0.05	1.21^{+0.03}_{−0.08}	6068	Neptune-like.
HD 158259 e	0.0191^{+0.0030}_{−0.0032}	0.5424	7.9510^{+0.0022}_{−0.0021}			radial vel.	88.11±0.05	1.21^{+0.03}_{−0.08}	6068	Neptune-like.
HD 158259 f	0.0193^{+0.0041}_{−0.0043}	0.5478	12.028±0.009			radial vel.	88.11±0.05	1.21^{+0.03}_{−0.08}	6068	Neptune-like.
HD 164922 d	0.0331^{+0.0031}_{−0.0031}3	0.1633	12.4584^{+0.0019}_{−0.0023}	0.2292^{+0.0026}_{−0.0027}		radial vel.	72.1±0.9	0.9211±0.0318	5393.4305±68.3325	Super-earth.
HD 190007 b	0.0488^{+0.0038}_{−0.0041}	0.362	11.724128±0.000099			radial vel.	41.4679^{+0.0329}_{−0.0326}	0.77±0.02	4610±20	Neptune-like.
HD 191939 b	0.03146±0.0220	0.3042±0.0067	8.8803256±0.0000047	0.0804^{+0.0025}_{−0.0023}	880±20	transit	174.849^{+0.0733}_{−0.0731}	0.81±0.04	5348±100	Host star also known as TOI-1339
HD 191939 c	0.02518±0.0031	0.2850±0.0067	28.579743±0.000045	0.1752^{+0.0055}_{−0.0050}	600±13	transit	174.849^{+0.0733}_{−0.0731}	0.81±0.04	5348±100	Host star also known as TOI-1339
HD 191939 d	0.00881±0.0019	0.2672±0.0062	38.353037±0.000060	0.2132^{+0.0065}_{−0.0061}	540±11	transit	174.849^{+0.0733}_{−0.0731}	0.81±0.04	5348±100	Host star also known as TOI-1339
HD 219553 b	1.94±0.17		1481.6±61.7	2.84±0.08		radial vel.	332.9±1.7	1.39±0.09	4824±60	Red giant host star also known as HIP 114933
HD 238090 b	0.0217^{+0.0029}_{−0.0030}		13.671^{+0.011}_{−0.010}	0.0932±0.0011	469.6^{+2.3}_{−2.6}	radial vel.	49.68±0.03	0.578±0.021	3933±51	Orbiting primary star in binary system Gliese 458
HD 332231 b	0.251±0.017	0.867^{+0.027}_{−0.025}	18.70173±0.00028	0.1436^{+0.0032}_{−0.0033}	876±17	transit	262	1.127±0.077	6089^{+97}_{−96}	TOI 1456
HIP 65Ab	3.213±0.078	2.03^{+0.61}_{−0.49}	0.9809761^{+0.000037}_{−0.000034}	0.01782±0.00021	1411±15	transit	201.85818±0.2609251	0.781±0.027	4590±49	an ultra-short-period Jupiter orbiting a bright (V=11.1 mag) K4-dwarf.
HIP 38594 b	0.026^{+0.012}_{−0.014}		60.711^{+0.426}_{−0.192}	0.256^{+0.006}_{−0.007}		radial vel.	58.0	0.61±0.02		habitable zone
HIP 38594 c	0.135^{+0.077}_{−0.035}		3525^{+541}_{−572}	3.842^{+0.399}_{−0.441}		radial vel.	58.0	0.61±0.02		
HIP 4845 b	0.053^{+0.016}_{−0.028}		34.151^{+0.17}_{−0.09}	0.177^{+0.016}_{−0.020}		radial vel.	68.8	0.62±0.04		
HIP 48714 b	0.071^{+0.023}_{−0.020}		17.819^{+0.004}_{−0.009}	0.112±0.003		radial vel.	34.3	0.58±0.02		
HIP 67522 b	0.25	0.894^{+0.048}_{−0.047}	6.9596^{+0.000016}_{−0.000015}		1174±21	transit	416±4	1.22±0.05	5675±75	One more candidate planet around very young (age below 20 million years) star
HIP 107772 b	0.049^{+0.014}_{−0.030}		55.259^{+0.111}_{−0.311}	0.243^{+0.022}_{−0.027}		radial vel.	77.1	0.63±0.08		habitable zone
K2-85 b		0.107±0.009	0.684559±0.000026			transit	317.8±1.2		4427±48	Also known as EPIC 210707130 p1
K2-106c		0.188±0.018	13.334621±0.000068			transit	803±10		5613±39	Candidate since 2017
K2-111 c	0.0356±0.0035		15.6785^{+0.0064}_{−0.0063}	0.1166±0.0025		radial vel.	680±60	0.89±0.02	5730±50	
K2-211c		0.116±0.018	2.601404±0.000072			transit	895±14	0.882^{+0.019}_{−0.027}	5360±51	
K2-282d		0.232±0.027	27.248322±0.00047			transit	1638.22±25.34	0.94±0.04	5499±109	
K2-299c		0.223±0.080	14.648966±0.000031			transit	1219±16		5724±72	Also known as EPIC 206024342 p2
K2-299d		0.152±0.054	4.507464±0.0000077			transit	1219±16		5724±72	Also known as EPIC 206024342 p3
K2-301c		0.152±0.018	5.2986±0.00035			transit	1491±45		4114±99	Also known as EPIC 206042996 p2
K2-302c		0.089±0.009	2.255438±0.000037			transit	359.3±3.5		3297±73	Also known as EPIC 206215704 p2
K2-302d		0.098±0.009	2.909216±0.000032			transit	359.3±3.5		3297±73	Also known as EPIC 206215704 p3
K2-315b		0.085±0.005	3.1443189±0.0000049	0.0234	460±5	transit	185±1	0.174±0.004	3300±30	Also called the "Pi Earth" due its orbital period, or EPIC 249631677b
K2-316b		0.119	1.133	0.0147	841	transit	368			EPIC 249384674b
K2-316c		0.163	5.260	0.0582	423	transit	368			EPIC 249384674c
K2-317b		0.261	6.220	0.0542	432	transit	577			EPIC 249557502b
K2-318b		0.148	7.010	0.0911	456	transit	483			EPIC 249826231b
K2-319b		0.249	26.680	0.1516	641	transit	686			EPIC 201663879b
K2-320b		0.234	1.995	0.0142	698	transit	356			EPIC 201796690b
K2-321b		0.174	2.298	0.0410	701	transit	254			EPIC 248480671b
K2-322b		0.171	8.205	0.0594	635	transit	404			EPIC 248558190b
K2-323b		0.187	24.930	0.1275	318	transit	387			EPIC 248616368b
K2-324b		0.217	3.262	0.0331	707	transit	447			EPIC 248639308b
K2-325b		0.196	6.930	0.0419	423	transit	365			EPIC 246074965b
K2-326b		0.203	1.256	0.0198	1114	transit	928			EPIC 246472939b
K2-329b	0.260^{+0.020}_{−0.022}	0.774^{+0.026}_{−0.024}	12.4551225±0.0000031	0.1016^{+0.0018}_{−0.0019}	650^{+53}_{−70}	transit	760±9	0.912^{+0.048}_{−0.049}	5282^{+40}_{−39}	Also called EPIC 246193072 b
KMT-2019-BLG-1953L b	0.59^{+0.71}_{−0.32}			0.8^{+0.9}_{−0.6}		microlensing	23000^{+3600}_{−4300}	0.31^{+0.37}_{−0.17}		
KMT-2019-BLG-1953L c	0.28^{+0.35}_{−0.15}			0.8^{+0.9}_{−0.7}		microlensing	23000^{+3600}_{−4300}	0.31^{+0.37}_{−0.17}		
Kepler-160e		0.170^{+0.015}_{−0.012}	378.417^{+0.028}_{−0.025}	1.089^{+0.037}_{−0.073}	244.8^{+2.1}_{−2.9}	transit	3140±60	0.88	5471^{+115}_{−37}	Next expected transit in September 2020.
Kepler-385d		0.233	56.4159			transit	4870±160			
Kepler-305e		0.160	3.20538			transit	2900±90			
Kepler-598c		0.270	86.4945			transit	2260±40			FPP=1.0%
Kepler-647c		0.357	29.6663			transit	3660±70			
Kepler-716c		0.124	3.96999			transit	2110±30			FPP=0.6%
Kepler-783c		0.208	7.05395			transit	1707±15			
Kepler-1001c		0.140	9.18186			transit	3110±80			
Kepler-1085c		0.291	56.7771			transit	4630±150			
Kepler-1514c		0.1049^{+0.0051}_{−0.0039}	10.514181±0.000039	0.0997±0.0018	1066^{+16}_{−14}	transit	1240	1.196^{+0.065}_{−0.063}	6145^{+99}_{−80}	
Kepler-1661(AB) b	0.053±0.038	0.345±0.005	175.06±0.06	0.633±0.005	243	transit	1355.26±9.56	0.841±0.022	5100±100	
Kepler-1649c	0.0038	0.095^{+0.014}_{−0.010}	19.53527±0.00010	0.0649	234±20	transit	301.6±1.6	0.1977±0.0051	3240±61	Habitable zone, Earth-like
Kepler-1662b	0.223	0.790	134.4628			transit				Host star also known as KOI-1783
Kepler-1663b		0.294	17.6046			transit	1112±11			Host star also known as KOI-252
Kepler-1664b		0.270	14.3868			transit				Host star also known as KOI-349
Kepler-1665b		0.253	11.9548			transit	1104±5			Host star also known as KOI-650
Kepler-1666b		0.257	25.8476			transit	4680±190			Host star also known as KOI-945
Kepler-1666c		0.257	25.8476			transit	4680±190			Host star also known as KOI-945
Kepler-1667b		0.266	83.5781			transit	2080±20			Host star also known as KOI-1311
Kepler-1668b		0.388	15.434			transit	4500±200			Host star also known as KOI-1470
Kepler-1669b		0.248	9.51216			transit	1800±40			Host star also known as KOI-1475
Kepler-1670b		0.299	20.4998			transit	7200±400			Host star also known as KOI-1705
Kepler-1671b		0.118	4.16787			transit	1176±7			Host star also known as KOI-1738
Kepler-1672b		0.265	150.878			transit	1189±14			Host star also known as KOI-1822
Kepler-1673b		0.262	33.7888			transit	2420±20			Host star also known as KOI-1863
Kepler-1674b		0.286	62.5611			transit	3400±100			Host star also known as KOI-1892
Kepler-1675b		0.279	63.0382			transit	2163±19			Host star also known as KOI-1928
Kepler-1676b		0.301	29.9221			transit				Host star also known as KOI-1943
Kepler-1677b		0.241	22.064			transit	2250±30			Host star also known as KOI-1984, FPP=0.6%
Kepler-1678b		0.295	147.974			transit	2830±70			Host star also known as KOI-2066, FPP=0.5%
Kepler-1679b		0.184	9.75376			transit	3040±100			Host star also known as KOI-2106
Kepler-1680b		0.121	8.77424			transit	1020±5			Host star also known as KOI-2120
Kepler-1681b		0.2227	69.8956			transit	2100±300			Host star also known as KOI-2132
Kepler-1682b		0.257	14.8334			transit	3900±160			Host star also known as KOI-2229
Kepler-1683b		0.167	15.0337			transit	2440±50			Host star also known as KOI-2293
Kepler-1684b		0.256	47.7055			transit	2060±40			Host star also known as KOI-2417
Kepler-1685b		0.230	20.4905			transit	3840±150			Host star also known as KOI-2504
Kepler-1686b		0.127	9.30987			transit	2430±30			Host star also known as KOI-2559
Kepler-1687b		0.147	5.77954			transit	1375±17			Host star also known as KOI-2588
Kepler-1688b		0.112	5.62012			transit	1850±380			Host star also known as KOI-2733
Kepler-1689b		0.084	8.483			transit	967±5			Host star also known as KOI-2755
Kepler-1690b		0.250	234.636			transit	2340±30			Host star also known as KOI-2757
Kepler-1691b		0.163	3.8482			transit	4290±110			Host star also known as KOI-2802
Kepler-1692b		0.099	5.95966			transit	1960±20			Host star also known as KOI-2849
Kepler-1693b		0.115	12.0999			transit	2530±50			Host star also known as KOI-2871
Kepler-1694b		0.105	3.89526			transit	1698±16			Host star also known as KOI-2878, FPP=0.6%
Kepler-1695b		0.099	4.7329			transit	2640±40			Host star also known as KOI-3048, FPP=0.5%
Kepler-1696b		0.250	65.9409			transit	5100±200			Host star also known as KOI-3361
Kepler-1697b		0.112	33.4969			transit	813±2			Host star also known as KOI-3478
Kepler-1698b		0.095	1.2107			transit	729±3			Host star also known as KOI-3864
Kepler-1699b		0.139	3.49082			transit				Host star also known as KOI-3933
Kepler-1701b		0.198	169.134			transit	1940±20			Host star also known as KOI-4054, potentially habitable exoplanet
Kepler-1702b		0.143	18.5012			transit	2860±90			Host star also known as KOI-4386
KMT-2016-BLG-2397b	2.42			2.83		microlensing	16000	0.62^{+0.29}_{−0.30}		Multiple solutions for planetary parameters
KMT-2016-BLG-2364b	3.93			2.63		microlensing	21000	0.50^{+0.40}_{−0.22}		
KMT-2018-BLG-0748Lb	0.18^{+0.29}_{−0.10}			0.62±0.09		microlensing	24000	0.0870^{+0.138}_{−0.047}		
KMT-2019-BLG-1339Lb	12.2^{+16.1}_{−6.7}			0.67^{+0.77}_{−0.55}		microlensing	23000±3000	0.27^{+0.366}_{−0.15}		Multiple solutions for planetary parameters
KMT-2019-BLG-2073	0.19					microlensing	12000			Free-floating planet
L 168-9b	0.0145±0.00176	0.124±0.008	1.4015±0.00018	0.02091±0.00024	816±160	transit	82.02833±0.07827753	0.62±0.03	3800±70	
Lacaille 9352 b	0.0132±0.0019	0.168	9.262±0.001	0.068±0.002	468	radial vel.	10.721±0.002	0.468±0.012	3688±86	Potentially rocky world, larger than Earth, also known as GJ 887b
Lacaille 9352 c	0.0234±0.0038	0.238	21.789^{+0.004}_{−0.005}	0.120±0.004	352	radial vel.	10.721±0.002	0.468±0.012	3688±86	Potentially habitable, larger than Earth, also known as GJ 887c
LHS 1815 b	0.0132±0.0047	0.0971±0.005	3.81433±0.00003	0.0404±0.0094	617±84	transit	97	0.502	3643±142	
LP 714-47 b	0.097±0.005	0.420±0.027	4.052037±0.000004	0.0417±0.0005	700^{+19}_{−24}	transit	171.8±0.4	0.59±0.02	3950±51	Host star also known as G 160-62 or TOI 442, planet in Neptune desert
LTT 9779 b	0.092±0.003	0.421±0.021	0.792054±0.000014	0.01679±0.0014	2000	transit	262.8±1.0	1.02^{+0.02}_{−0.03}	5499±50	Neptune desert planet
MOA-2009-BLG-319Lb	0.2077±0.0255			2.03±0.21		microlensing	22800±2300	0.514±0.063		
NGTS-11 b	0.37±0.14	0.823±0.035	35.4553±0.0002	0.201±0.002	440±40	transit	624±6	0.862±0.028	5050±80	
NGTS-12b	0.208±0.022	1.048±0.032	7.532806±0.000048	0.0757±0.0014	1257±34	transit	1474±25	1.021^{+0.056}_{−0.049}	5690±130	
OGLE-2006-BLG-284 b	0.45^{+0.14}_{−0.40}			2.2±0.8		microlensing	13000±4900	0.35^{+0.3}_{−0.2}		Binary host with 2.1 astronomical unit separation and uncertain, possibly unstable, planetary orbit.
OGLE-2016-BLG-1928	0.001			n/a		microlensing	30000	n/a	n/a	Rogue planet
OGLE-2017-BLG-0406 b	0.41±0.05			3.5±0.3		microlensing	17000±1600	0.56±0.07	4848	High fidelity microlensing event
OGLE-2017-BLG-0604b	0.51			4.06		microlensing	13000	0.70±0.28		
OGLE-2017-BLG-1049Lb	5.53^{+3.62}_{−2.87}			3.92^{+1.10}_{−1.32}		microlensing	18500^{+3600}_{−4500}	0.55^{+0.36}_{−0.29}		
OGLE-2017-BLG-1375b	10.33			2.97		microlensing	12000	0.77^{+0.27}_{−0.23}		Multiple solutions for planetary parameters
OGLE-2018-BLG-0677Lb	0.0125^{+0.0185}_{−0.0084}			0.68^{+0.27}_{−0.22}		microlensing	27000±3500	0.12^{+0.14}_{−0.08}		Milky way bulge
OGLE-2018-BLG-1269Lb	0.69^{+0.44}_{−0.22}		4383	4.61^{+1.70}_{−1.17}		microlensing	8300^{+3000}_{−2000}	0.35^{+0.3}_{−0.2}		Very high fidelity event
OGLE-2018-BLG-0799Lb	0.22^{+0.19}_{−0.06}			1.27^{+0.45}_{−0.29}		microlensing	16000	0.08^{+0.08}_{−0.02}		
OGLE-2019-BLG-0551	0.0242					microlensing				Poorly characterized free-floating planet
Proxima Centauri c	0.0179±0.006		1928±20	1.489±0.049	39^{+16}_{−18}	radial vel.	4.244±0.001	0.1221±0.0022	3042±117	Second planet discovered orbiting nearest star to the Solar System
TIC 237913194b	1.942^{+0.092}_{−0.091}	1.117^{+0.054}_{−0.047}	15.168865±0.000018	0.1207±0.0037	974	transit	1009±6	1.026^{+0.057}_{−0.055}	5788±80	Very eccentric orbit
TOI 122b	0.028^{+0.029}_{−0.010}	0.243±0.016	5.078030±0.000015	0.0392±0.0007	471	transit	202.9±0.7	0.312±0.007	3403±100	
TOI-132 b	0.07048^{+0.00598}_{−0.00604}	0.305±0.012	2.1097019^{+0.000012}_{−0.000011}	0.026^{+0.002}_{−0.003}	1395^{+52}_{−72}	transit	536.43±89.11	0.970±0.06	5397±46	
TOI-157 b	1.18±0.13	1.29±0.02	2.0845435±0.0000023	0.03138^{+0.00025}_{−0.00020}	1588^{+21}_{−20}	transit	1171	0.948^{+0.023}_{−0.018}	5404^{+70}_{−67}	
TOI 169 b	0.791^{+0.064}_{−0.06}	1.086^{+0.081}_{−0.048}	2.2554477±0.0000063	0.03524^{+0.00069}_{−0.00079}	1715^{+22}_{−20}	transit	1345	1.147^{+0.069}_{−0.075}	5880^{+54}_{−49}	
TOI 237b	0.009^{+0.006}_{−0.003}	0.128±0.011	5.436098±0.000039	0.0341±0.0010	388	transit	124.2±0.7	0.179±0.004	3212±100	
TOI-251b		0.245±0.016	4.937770^{+0.000028}_{−0.000029}	0.05741^{+0.00023}_{−0.00017}		transit	324.4±1.4	1.036^{+0.013}_{−0.009}	5875^{+100}_{−190}	
TOI-257b	0.134±0.023	0.626±0.013	18.38827±0.00072	0.1523±0.0017	1033±19	transit	251.37±0.065	1.38^{+0.056}_{−0.009}	6075±90	Host star also called HD 19916.
TOI-261 b		0.263	3.36			transit				
TOI-261 c		0.225	13.04			transit				
TOI-421 b	0.051^{+0.004}_{−0.003}	0.461±0.012	16.06815^{+0.00034}_{−0.00035}	0.1182^{+0.0026}_{−0.0027}	696.6±12.2	transit	244.3±1.9	0.852^{+0.029}_{−0.021}	5325^{+78}_{−58}	Also in system a red dwarf star at 2200 a.u. separation
TOI-421 c	0.0222±0.0022	0.243±0.017	5.19676^{+0.00049}_{−0.00048}	0.0557^{+0.0012}_{−0.0013}	1014.9^{+17.9}_{−17.6}	transit	244.3±1.9	0.852^{+0.029}_{−0.021}	5325^{+78}_{−58}	Also in system a red dwarf star at 2200 a.u. separation
TOI-469 b		0.294	13.63			transit				Host star also known as HIP 29442.
TOI-481 b	1.53±0.03	0.99±0.01	10.33111±0.00002	0.097±0.001	1370±10	transit	587	1.14^{+0.02}_{−0.01}	5735±72	
TOI-519 b	<14	0.75±0.21	1.2652328±0.0000005	0.012±0.004	760±54	transit	378±3	0.369^{+0.026}_{−0.097}	3350^{+100}_{−200}	Very faint 17-magnitude host star
TOI 540 b		0.081±0.005	1.2391491±0.0000017	0.01223±0.00036	611±23	transit	45.67±0.29	0.159±0.014	3216±83	
TOI-561 b	0.0050±0.0011	0.127±0.006	0.446578±0.000017	0.01055±0.00008		transit	279.2±1.6	0.785±0.018	5455^{+65}_{−47}	
TOI-561 c	0.017±0.003	0.257±0.009	10.779±0.004	0.08809±0.0007		transit	279.2±1.6	0.785±0.018	5455^{+65}_{−47}	
TOI-561 d	0.038±0.004	0.226±0.011	25.62±0.04	0.1569±0.0012		transit	279.2±1.6	0.785±0.018	5455^{+65}_{−47}	
TOI-561 e	0.050±0.007	0.238±0.010	77.23±0.39	0.3274^{+0.0028}_{−0.0027}		transit	279.2±1.6	0.785±0.018	5455^{+65}_{−47}	
TOI-682 b		0.392	6.84			transit				
TOI-700 b	0.00406^{+0.003}_{−0.00116}	0.0901^{+0.00839}_{−0.00776}	9.97701^{+0.00024}_{−0.00028}	0.0637^{+0.0064}_{−0.006}		transit	101.5	0.416±0.01	3480±135	
TOI-700 c	0.0249^{+0.0085}_{−0.0057}	0.2346^{+0.0214}_{−0.0205}	16.051998^{+0.000089}_{−0.000092}	0.0925^{+0.0088}_{−0.0083}		transit	101.5	0.416±0.01	3480±135	
TOI-700 d	0.00711^{+0.0022}_{−0.00164}	0.1062±0.0098	37.426^{+0.0007}_{−0.001}	0.163±0.015	295±55	transit	101.5	0.416±0.01	3480±135	First "Earth sized" discovered by TESS
TOI-732 b	0.098	0.119	0.7683881	0.012	892	transit	72	0.379	3360	Orbiting primary star of binary LDS 3977
TOI-732 c	0.027	0.205	12.25	0.07673	323	transit	72	0.379	3360	Orbiting primary star of binary LDS 3977
TOI-763 b	0.031±0.002	0.203±0.010	5.6057±0.0013	0.0600±0.0006	1038±16	transit	311	0.917±0.028	5444±110	
TOI-763 c	0.029±0.003	0.235±0.011	12.2737^{+0.0053}_{−0.0077}	0.1011±0.0010	800±12	transit	311	0.917±0.028	5444±110	
TOI-776 b	0.0147±0.0031	0.163±0.010	8.24664^{+0.00009}_{−0.00006}	0.0652±0.0011	513±12	transit	88.6±0.1	0.544±0.028	3709±70	
TOI-776 c	0.0192±0.0047	0.184±0.012	15.6653^{+0.0008}_{−0.0007}	0.1000±0.0017	415±10	transit	88.6±0.1	0.544±0.028	3709±70	
TOI-813 b		0.599±0.034	83.8911^{+0.0027}_{−0.0031}	0.423^{+0.031}_{−0.037}	610^{+28}_{−21}	transit	864.8192±5.156379	1.32±0.06	5907±150	
TOI 824 b	0.058±0.006	0.261^{+0.018}_{−0.017}	1.392978^{+0.000018}_{−0.000017}	0.02177±0.00032	1253^{+38}_{−37}	transit	208	0.69^{+0.009}_{−0.007}	4569±50	Neptunian desert planet, likely stripped of hydrogen envelope
TOI-836 c		0.244	8.59			transit				Validated before TOI-836 b, but not assigned a letter before its validation in 2023
TOI-892 b	0.95±0.07	1.07±0.02	10.62656±0.00007	0.092±0.005	1397±40	transit	1120	1.28^{+0.03}_{−0.02}	6261±80	
TOI 837 b	<1.2	0.768^{+0.091}_{−0.072}	8.3248762±0.0000157			transit	466.5±1.2	1.118±0.059	6047±162	Belongs to open cluster IC 2602
TOI-849 b	0.128±0.008	0.308^{+0.014}_{−0.011}	0.7655240±0.0000027	0.01598±0.00013	1800	transit	735	0.929±0.023	5329±48	Neptunian desert planet
TOI-942b		0.429±0.018	4.324190±0.00003	0.04796^{+0.00073}_{−0.00065}		transit	498±2	0.788^{+0.037}_{−0.031}	4928^{+125}_{−85}	Host star TYC 5909–319–1
TOI-942c		0.517^{+0.017}_{−0.016}	10.156430^{+0.000069}_{−0.000079}	0.0847^{+0.0012}_{−0.0011}		transit	498±2	0.788^{+0.037}_{−0.031}	4928^{+125}_{−85}	Host star TYC 5909–319–1
TOI-954 b	0.174^{+0.018}_{−0.017}	0.852^{+0.053}_{−0.062}	3.6849729^{+0.0000027}_{−0.0000028}	0.04963^{+0.00089}_{−0.00090}	1526^{+123}_{−164}	transit	768.5±8.3	1.201^{+0.066}_{−0.064}	5710^{+53}_{−49}	
TOI-1054 b		0.293	15.51			transit				
TOI-1130 b		0.3256±0.009	4.066499±0.000046	0.04394^{+0.00035}_{−0.00038}	876±17	transit	190	0.684^{+0.16}_{−0.17}	4250±67	
TOI-1130 c	0.974^{+0.043}_{−0.044}	1.5^{+0.27}_{−0.22}	8.350381±0.000033	0.07098^{+0.00056}_{−0.0006}	637±12	transit	190	0.684^{+0.16}_{−0.17}	4250±67	
TOI-1203 d		0.335	25.49			transit				Validated before non-transiting TOI-1203 b and c, but not assigned a letter before their discovery in 2025
TOI-1230 b		0.288	25.06			transit				
TOI-1235 b	0.0217±0.00025	0.155±0.007	3.444729^{+0.000031}_{−0.000028}	0.03845^{+0.00037}_{−0.0004}	754±18	transit	129	0.640±0.016	3872±70	one more suspected planet in system
TOI-1266 b	0.042^{+0.035}_{−0.028}	0.212^{+0.014}_{−0.011}	10.894843^{+0.000067}_{−0.000066}	0.0736^{+0.0016}_{−0.0017}	413±20	transit	117.5±0.1	0.48±0.1	3570±100	
TOI-1266 c	0.007^{+0.006}_{−0.005}	0.139^{+0.013}_{−0.012}	18.80151^{+0.00067}_{−0.00069}	0.1058^{+0.0023}_{−0.0024}	344±16	transit	117.5±0.1	0.48±0.1	3570±100	Possibly atmosphere of steam
TOI-1338 b	0.10382±0.0622	0.61±0.0169	95.2	0.4607	724	transit	1301			First circumbinary planet discovered by TESS
TOI-1728 b	0.084^{+0.017}_{−0.016}	0.450±0.014	3.491510^{+0.000062}_{−0.000057}	0.0391±0.0009	767±8	transit	198.2±0.5	0.646^{+0.023}_{−0.022}	3980^{+31}_{−32}	
TOI-1774 b		0.259	16.71			transit				Star also known as HD 85426.
TOI-1899 b	0.67±0.04	0.99±0.03	29.090312^{+0.000036}_{−0.000035}	0.1587^{+0.067}_{−0.075}	362±7	transit	419±1	0.627^{+0.026}_{−0.028}	3841^{+54}_{−45}	
TVLM 513-46546 b	0.38±0.24		221±5	0.3±0.0036		astrometry	34.90±0.07	0.09	2500	
TYC 8998-760-1 c	6±1	1.1^{+0.6}_{−0.3}		320	1240^{+160}_{−170}	imaging	309.4±0.9		4783	
USco1621 b	16			2880	2270	imaging	450	0.36	3460	
USco1556 b	15			3500	2240	imaging	459	0.33	3410	
XO-7b	0.709	1.373	2.8641424	0.04421	1743	transit	763	1.405	6250	
WASP-148 b	0.291±0.025	0.722±0.055	8.80381±0.000043	0.22±0.063	940±80	transit	809±5	1.00±0.08	5460±130	
WASP-148 c	0.397^{+0.203}_{−0.044}		34.515±0.029	0.359±0.086	590±50	radial vel.	809±5	1.00±0.08	5460±130	
WASP-150 b	8.46^{+0.28}_{−0.2}	1.07^{+0.024}_{−0.025}	5.644207^{+0.00003}_{−0.000004}	0.0694^{+0.0011}_{−0.0008}	1460±11	transit	2422	1.394^{+0.07}_{−0.049}	6218^{+49}_{−45}	
WASP-176 b	0.855^{+0.072}_{−0.069}	1.505^{+0.05}_{−0.045}	3.899052±0.00005	0.0535^{+0.001}_{−0.0019}	1721^{+28}_{−21}	transit	1883	1.345^{+0.08}_{−0.13}	5941^{+77}_{−79}	
WASP-186 b	4.22±0.18	1.11±0.03	5.026799^{+0.000012}_{−0.000014}	0.0600^{+0.0012}_{−0.0013}	1348^{+23}_{−22}	transit	913±11	1.22^{+0.07}_{−0.08}	6361^{+105}_{−82}	Also called TOI-1494
WASP-187 b	0.80±0.09	1.64±0.05	5.147878^{+0.000005}_{−0.000009}	0.0653±0.0013	1726^{+31}_{−2}	transit	1224±21	1.54±0.09	6150^{+92}_{−85}	Also called TOI-1493
Wendelstein-1b	0.59^{+0.17}_{−0.13}	1.0314^{+0.00204}_{−0.021}	2.663416±0.000001	0.0282±0.0009	1727^{+78}_{−90}	transit	1004±10	0.65±0.1	3984^{+152}_{−46}	
Wendelstein-2b	0.731^{+0.541}_{−0.311}	1.1592±0.0061	1.7522239±0.0000008	0.0234±0.0015	1852^{+120}_{−140}	transit	1875±20	0.73±0.11	4288^{+133}_{−111}	Extended gaseous envelope
WD 1856+534 b	13.8	0.93±0.09	1.4079405±0.0000011	0.0204±0.0012		transit	80.737±0.144	0.518±0.055	4710±60	Orbiting a white dwarf star

== Specific exoplanet lists ==
Lists of exoplanets

- List of directly imaged exoplanets
- List of exoplanet extremes
- List of exoplanet firsts
- List of exoplanets discovered by the Kepler space telescope
- List of exoplanets observed during Kepler's K2 mission
- List of exoplanets discovered by the TESS mission
- List of terrestrial exoplanet candidates for atmosphere detection
- List of hottest exoplanets
- List of coldest exoplanets
- List of multiplanetary systems
- List of circumbinary planets
- List of nearest exoplanets
- List of nearest terrestrial exoplanet candidates
- List of potentially habitable exoplanets
- List of proper names of exoplanets
- List of largest exoplanets
- List of smallest exoplanets
- List of transiting exoplanets
- List of exoplanets and planetary debris around giant stars
- List of exoplanets and planetary debris around white dwarfs
- List of extrasolar planetary collisions

=== Lists of exoplanets by year of discovery ===
- List of exoplanets discovered before 2000 (31)
- List of exoplanets discovered between 2000–2009 (376)
- List of exoplanets discovered in 2010 (109)
- List of exoplanets discovered in 2011 (178)
- List of exoplanets discovered in 2012 (147)
- List of exoplanets discovered in 2013 (149)
- List of exoplanets discovered in 2014 (869)
- List of exoplanets discovered in 2015 (144)
- List of exoplanets discovered in 2016 (1497)
- List of exoplanets discovered in 2017 (152)
- List of exoplanets discovered in 2018 (300)
- List of exoplanets discovered in 2019 (169)
- List of exoplanets discovered in 2020 (256)
- List of exoplanets discovered in 2021 (253)
- List of exoplanets discovered in 2022 (312)
- List of exoplanets discovered in 2023 (304)
- List of exoplanets discovered in 2024 (284)
- List of exoplanets discovered in 2025 (239)
- List of exoplanets discovered in 2026 (355)
