= HD 164922 b =

Extrasolar planet in the constellation Hercules

Discovery
- Discovered by: Butler et al.
- Discovery site: California, USA
- Discovery date: July 15, 2006
- Detection method: Radial velocity

Orbital characteristics
- Semi-major axis: 2.11 ± 0.13 AU (316,000,000 ± 19,000,000 km)
- Eccentricity: 0.05 ± 0.14
- Orbital period (sidereal): 1155 ± 23 d
- Time of periastron: 2,411,100 ± 280
- Argument of periastron: 195
- Semi-amplitude: 7.3 ± 1.2
- Star: HD 164922

Physical characteristics
- Mean radius: ~8 R_{🜨}
- Temperature: 159 K (−114 °C; −173 °F)

HD 164922 b is an exoplanet orbiting the star HD 164922 about 72 light-years from Earth in the constellation Hercules. Its inclination is not known, and its true mass may be significantly greater than the radial velocity lower limit of 0.36 Jupiter masses. The planet also has a low eccentricity of 0.05, about the same as Jupiter and Saturn in the Solar System. The exoplanet was found by using the radial velocity method, from radial-velocity measurements via observation of Doppler shifts in the spectrum of the planet's parent star.

== Characteristics ==
=== Mass, radius and temperature ===
HD 164922 b is a gas giant, an exoplanet that has a radius and mass around that of the planets Jupiter and Saturn. It has a temperature of 159 K (−114 °C; −173 °F). It has an estimated mass of around 0.36 M_{J}, and a potential radius of around 8 R_{🜨} based on its similar mass to Saturn.

=== Host star ===
The planet orbits a (G-type) star named HD 164922. The star has a mass of 0.87 M_{☉} and a radius of around 0.99 R_{☉}. It has a temperature of 5293 K and is 13.4 billion years old. In comparison, the Sun is about 4.6 billion years old and has a temperature of 5778 K. The star is metal-rich, with a metallicity ([Fe/H]) of 0.16, or 144% the solar amount. This is particularly odd for a star as old as HD 164922. Its luminosity (L_{☉}) is 70% of the solar luminosity.

The star's apparent magnitude, or how bright it appears from Earth's perspective, is 7.01. Therefore, HD 164922 is too dim to be seen with the naked eye, but can be viewed using good binoculars.

=== Orbit ===
HD 164922 b orbits its star every 1,155 days at a distance of 2.1 AU (compared to Mars's orbital distance from the Sun, which is around 1.5 AU). It receives only 15% of the sunlight as the Earth does from the Sun.

== Discovery ==
The search for HD 164922 b started when its host star was chosen an ideal target for a planet search using the radial velocity method (in which the gravitational pull of a planet on its star is measured by observing the resulting Doppler shift), as stellar activity would not overly mask or mimic Doppler spectroscopy measurements. It was also confirmed that HD 164922 is neither a binary star nor a quickly rotating star, common false positives when searching for transiting planets. Analysis of the resulting data found that the radial velocity variations most likely indicated the existence of a planet. The net result was an estimate of a 12.9 M_{🜨} planetary companion orbiting the star at a distance of 0.33 AU with an eccentricity of 0.07.

The discovery of HD 164922 b was reported in the online archive arXiv on June 30, 2016.

== See also ==
- 14 Herculis b
- List of exoplanets discovered between 2000–2009
