= HD 191939 =

Star in the constellation Draco

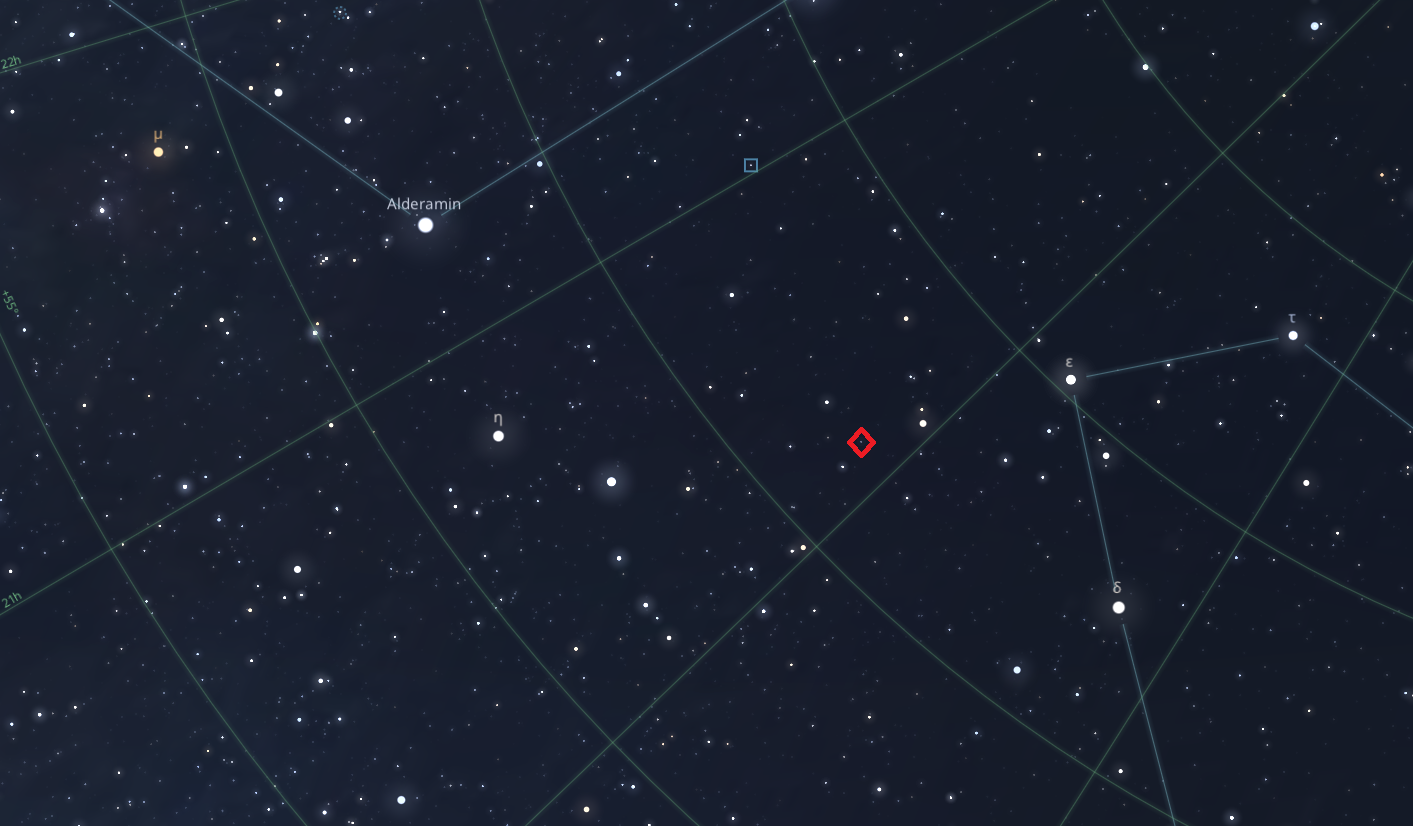
- Location of HD 191939 in the night sky. The star is marked within the red diamond.

Observation data Epoch J2000 Equinox ICRS
- Constellation: Draco
- Right ascension: 20^{h} 08^{m} 05.75515^{s}
- Declination: +66° 51′ 02.0766″
- Apparent magnitude (V): 8.971

Characteristics

HD 191939
- Evolutionary stage: main sequence
- Spectral type: G9V

Astrometry
Radial velocity (R_{v})	−9.23±0.16 km/s
Proper motion (μ)	RA: 150.194±0.015 mas/yr Dec.: −63.988±0.017 mas/yr
Parallax (π)	18.6967±0.0133 mas
Distance	174.4 ± 0.1 ly (53.49 ± 0.04 pc)
Absolute magnitude (M_{V})	+5.17

Details

HD 191939
Mass	0.81±0.04 M_{☉}
Radius	0.94±0.02 R_{☉}
Luminosity (bolometric)	0.65±0.02 L_{☉}
Surface gravity (log g)	4.3±0.1 cgs
Temperature	5348±100 K
Metallicity [Fe/H]	−0.15±0.06 dex
Rotational velocity (v sin i)	0.6±0.5 km/s
Age	7±3 Gyr

Other designations
- HD 191939, HIP 99175, TOI-1339, TIC 269701147, TYC 4244-964-1, 2MASS J20080574+6651019, Gaia DR2 2248126315275354496

Database references
SIMBAD	data
Exoplanet Archive	data

HD 191939 is a single yellow (G-type) main-sequence star, located approximately 174 light-years away in the northern constellation of Draco, taking its primary name from its Henry Draper Catalogue designation.

== Characteristics ==
HD 191939 is a Sun-like G-type main-sequence star, likely older than the Sun and relatively depleted in metals.

== Planetary system ==
In 2020, an analysis carried out by a team of astronomers led by astronomer Mariona Badenas-Agusti of the TESS project confirmed the existence of three gaseous planets, all smaller than Neptune, in orbit around HD 191939. Another non-transiting gas giant planet designated HD 191939 e was detected in 2021, along with a substellar object on a highly uncertain, 9 to 46 year orbit. In 2022, a sixth planet, with a mass comparable to Uranus, was discovered in the system's habitable zone. The 2021 study also suggested the possible presence of an additional non-transiting planet with a period of 17.7 days, but the 2022 study did not support this. The outermost planet, HD 191939 f, was better characterized in a 2026 study, which also presented astrometric measurements of its inclination and true mass: 98° and 4.8 M_{J}.

The HD 191939 planetary system
Companion (in order from star)	Mass	Semimajor axis (AU)	Orbital period (days)	Eccentricity	Inclination (°)	Radius
b	10.00±0.70 M_{🜨}	0.0804+0.0025 −0.0023	8.8803256	0.031+0.010 −0.011	88.10+0.14 −0.10	3.410±0.075 R_{🜨}
c	8.0±1.0 M_{🜨}	0.1752+0.0055 −0.0050	28.579743	0.034+0.034 −0.013	89.10+0.06 −0.08	3.195±0.075 R_{🜨}
d	2.80±0.60 M_{🜨}	0.2132+0.0065 −0.0061	38.353037	0.031+0.018 −0.012	89.49+0.05 −0.08	2.995±0.070 R_{🜨}
e	≥112.2±4.0 M_{🜨}	0.407±0.012	101.12±0.13	0.031+0.008 −0.016	88.7±0.7	—
g	≥13.5±2.0 M_{🜨}	0.812±0.028	284+10 −8	0.030+0.025 −0.011	—	—
f	4.81+0.60 −0.77 M_{J}	5.50+0.56 −0.71	5,100+760 −960	0.213+0.069 −0.064	98+12 −16	—

== See also ==
- List of extrasolar planets
- List of exoplanets discovered in 2020 (HD 191939 b, c and d)
- List of exoplanets discovered in 2021 (HD 191939 e)
- List of exoplanets discovered in 2022 (HD 191939 f & g)
