= HD 42936 =

Star in the constellation Mensa

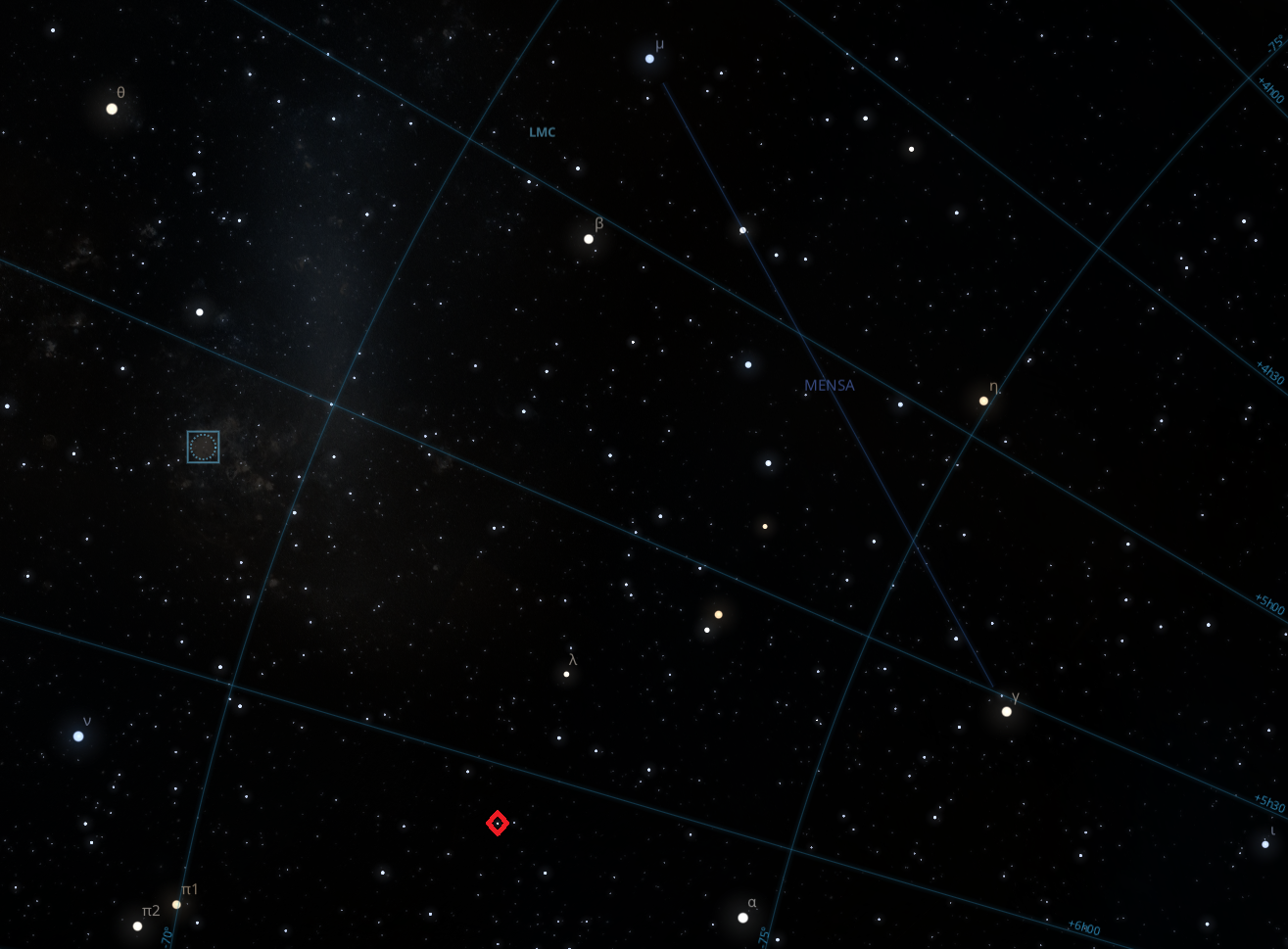
- Location of HD 42936 in the night sky. The star is marked within the red diamond.

Observation data Epoch J2000.0 (ICRS) Equinox ICRS
- Constellation: Mensa
- Right ascension: 06^{h} 06^{m} 29.84725^{s}
- Declination: −72° 30′ 45.5674″
- Apparent magnitude (V): 9.10

Characteristics

HD 42936A
- Evolutionary stage: main sequence star
- Spectral type: K0 IV/V
- B−V color index: +0.91

HD 42936B
- Evolutionary stage: main sequence star
- Spectral type: L

Astrometry
Radial velocity (R_{v})	35.64±0.49 km/s
Proper motion (μ)	RA: −0.716 mas/yr Dec.: −382.755 mas/yr
Parallax (π)	21.2496±0.1143 mas
Distance	153.5 ± 0.8 ly (47.1 ± 0.3 pc)
Absolute magnitude (M_{V})	5.78

Orbit
Primary	HD 42936A
Name	HD 42936B
Period (P)	506.89±0.01 d
Semi-major axis (a)	1.139±0.004 AU
Eccentricity (e)	0.596±0.001
Inclination (i)	63.89±0.78°
Argument of periastron (ω) (secondary)	158.88+0.03 −0.01°
Semi-amplitude (K_{1}) (primary)	2.65731+0.00033 −0.00002 km/s

Details

HD 42936A
Mass	0.900±0.009 M_{☉}
Radius	0.861±0.005 R_{☉}
Luminosity	0.510±0.003 L_{☉}
Surface gravity (log g)	4.266±0.045 cgs
Temperature	5,201±20 K
Metallicity [Fe/H]	0.147±0.013 dex
Rotation	21.8+0.5 −16.5 d
Rotational velocity (v sin i)	3.17±0.1 km/s
Age	9.6±0.8 Gyr

HD 42936B
Mass	91.90±0.85 M_{Jup}

Other designations
- DMPP-3, CD−72°312, CPD−72°451, GC 7845, HD 42936, HIP 28941, SAO 256269

Database references
SIMBAD	data
Exoplanet Archive	data

HD 42936, also known as DMPP-3, is a star located in the southern circumpolar constellation Mensa. With an apparent magnitude of 9.1, it is too faint to be detected with the naked eye but can be seen with a telescope. The star is relatively close at a distance of about 153 light-years (47 parsecs) but is receding with a heliocentric radial velocity of 35.6 km/s.

HD 42936 is an early K-type star with the blended luminosity class of a main sequence star and a subgiant. At present it has 87% the mass of the Sun and 91% the radius of the Sun. The object shines at 51% the luminosity of the Sun from its photosphere at an effective temperature of 5,138 K, which gives it an orangish yellow glow. HD 42936 has iron abundance 151% that of the Sun, meaning it is metal enriched despite an age of 10.9 billion years.

HD 42936 has a very low mass companion star in a close orbit, approaching to 0.498 AU at periastron.

== Planetary system ==
In 2019, a radial velocity analysis carried out by a team of astronomers led by astronomer John R. Barnes of the Dispersed Matter Planet Project (DMPP) confirmed the existence of a super-Earth in orbit around DMPP-3 A. Planets in close binary star systems such as this are rare.

A follow-up study in 2023 refined the parameters of the planet and companion star, and detected two additional radial velocity signals. One of these could be caused by a second, Earth-mass planet closer to the star, but the other, 800-day signal cannot be caused by an orbiting body because the companion star would make its orbit unstable. The study concludes that the 800-day signal must be caused by stellar activity, but if not for the companion star it could have been considered a likely planet, which has implications for other radial velocity planet detections.

The DMPP-3 A planetary system
Companion (in order from star)	Mass	Semimajor axis (AU)	Orbital period (days)	Eccentricity	Inclination (°)	Radius
c (unconfirmed)	≥1.065+0.173 −0.259 M_{🜨}	0.033+0.002 −0.0001	2.26+0.20 −0.10	0	—	—
b	≥2.22+0.50 −0.28 M_{🜨}	0.0670+0.0003 −0.0002	6.6732+0.0011 −0.0003	0.174+0.032 −0.084	—	—

== See also ==
- List of extrasolar planets
