= HD 164922 =

Star in the constellation Hercules

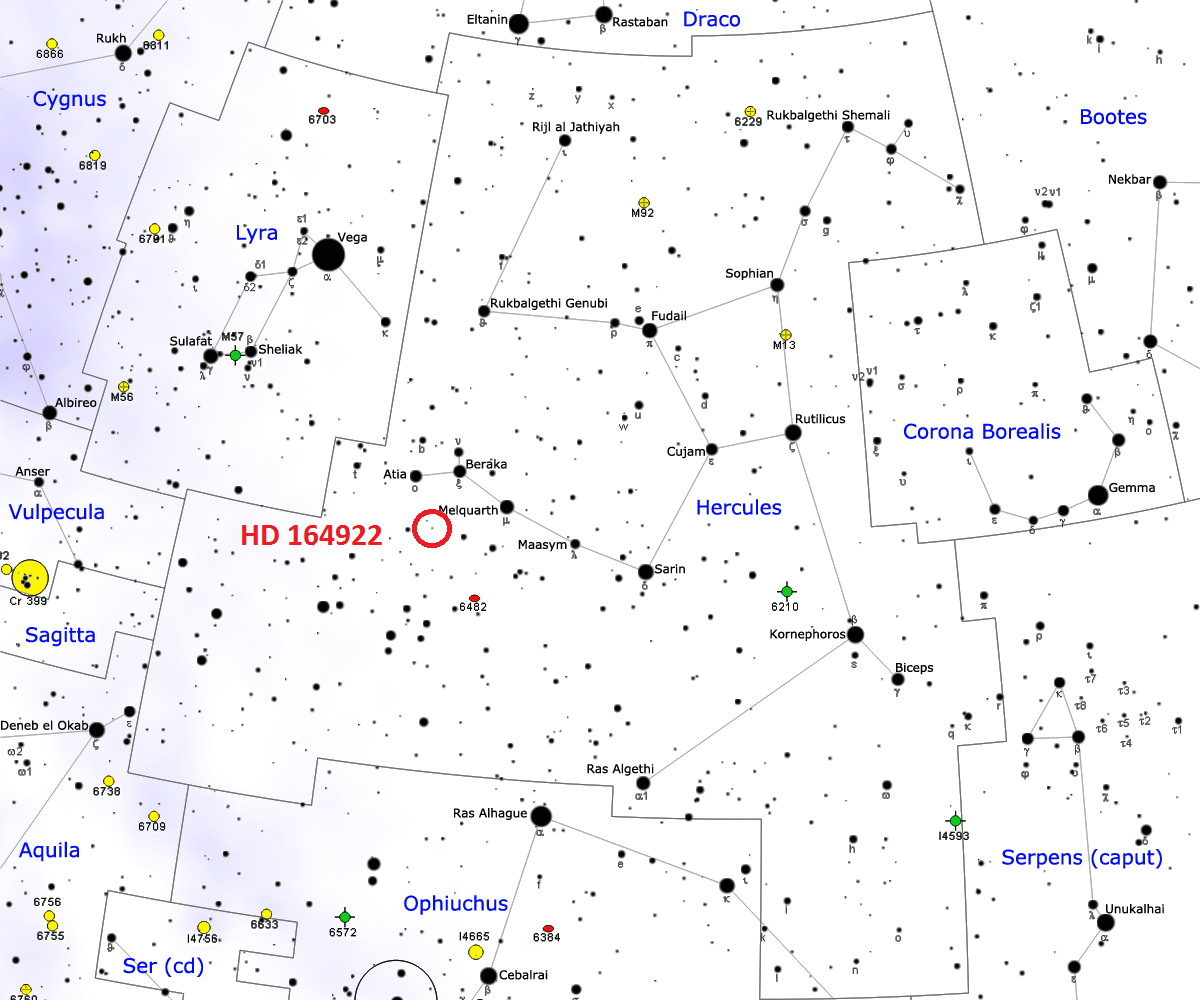
- Position of star HD 164922 in the constellation Hercules

Observation data Epoch J2000.0 Equinox ICRS
- Constellation: Hercules
- Right ascension: 18^{h} 02^{m} 30.86234^{s}
- Declination: +26° 18′ 46.8050″
- Apparent magnitude (V): +6.99

Characteristics
- Evolutionary stage: main sequence
- Spectral type: G9V
- B−V color index: 0.799±0.005

Astrometry
Radial velocity (R_{v})	20.16±0.12 km/s
Proper motion (μ)	RA: +389.772 mas/yr Dec.: −602.431 mas/yr
Parallax (π)	45.4954±0.0167 mas
Distance	71.69 ± 0.03 ly (21.980 ± 0.008 pc)
Absolute magnitude (M_{V})	5.29

Details
Mass	0.874±0.012 M_{☉}
Radius	0.999±0.017 R_{☉}
Luminosity	0.703±0.017 L_{☉}
Surface gravity (log g)	4.387±0.014 cgs
Temperature	5,390±30 K
Metallicity [Fe/H]	0.16±0.05 dex
Rotation	42.3+1.3 −0.7 d
Rotational velocity (v sin i)	<2.0 km/s
Age	13.4, 9.58+1.99 −1.55 Gyr

Other designations
- BD +26°3151, GJ 700.2, LFT 1388, SAO 85678, HIP 88348, 2MASS J18023085+2618471

Database references
SIMBAD	data
Exoplanet Archive	data
ARICNS	data

HD 164922 is a seventh magnitude G-type main sequence star in the constellation of Hercules. To view it, binoculars or a telescope are necessary, as it is too faint to be visible to the naked eye. It is 71.7 light-years (22.0 parsecs) distant from the Earth. It is reaching the end of its main sequence life and will soon evolve to become a red giant.

== Nomenclature ==
The name HD 164922 derives directly from the fact that the star is the 164,922nd star listed in the Henry Draper catalog. The designation b for its planet derives from the order of discovery. The designation of b is given to the first planet found orbiting a given star, followed by the other lowercase letters of the alphabet. In the case of HD 164922, only one was discovered, which was designated b, followed by three more planets, which were designated c, d, and e.

== Stellar characteristics ==
HD 164922 is a G-type main sequence star that is approximately 87% the mass of and 99% the radius of the Sun. It has a temperature of 5390 K and is about 10 billion years old, with estimates ranging as high as 13.4 billion years. In comparison, the Sun is about 4.6 billion years old and has a temperature of 5778 K.

The star is metal-rich, with a metallicity ([Fe/H]) of 0.16, or 144% the solar amount. This is particularly odd for a star as old as HD 164922. Its luminosity (L_{☉}) is 70% of the solar luminosity.

== Planetary system ==
On 15 July 2006, a long period Saturn-mass exoplanet was announced orbiting around HD 164922. This planet orbits at 2.11 AU from the star with a low eccentricity value of 0.05.

Almost exactly ten years later in 2016, another exoplanet, though less massive than the first planet, was discovered orbiting farther in from the star. This planet has a minimum mass of nearly 13 times that of Earth, meaning it is possibly a Neptune-like planet.

A third exoplanet, a hot super-Earth, was discovered in 2020, and a fourth, Neptune-mass, in 2021.

The HD 164922 planetary system
Companion (in order from star)	Mass	Semimajor axis (AU)	Orbital period (days)	Eccentricity	Inclination (°)	Radius
d	≥4.74±0.67 M_{🜨}	0.1023±0.0012	12.4584+0.0019 −0.0023	0.18+0.17 −0.12	—	—
e	≥10.52+0.99 −0.97 M_{🜨}	0.2292+0.0026 −0.0027	41.763±0.012	0.086+0.083 −0.060	—	—
c	≥14.3±1.1 M_{🜨}	0.3411±0.0039	75.817+0.037 −0.038	0.096+0.088 −0.066	—	—
b	≥0.344±0.013 M_{J}	2.149±0.025	1,198.5+3.2 −3.1	0.065+0.027 −0.029	—	—

== See also ==
- List of exoplanets discovered between 2000–2009 - HD 164922 b
- List of exoplanets discovered in 2016 - HD 164922 c
- List of exoplanets discovered in 2020 - HD 164922 d
- List of exoplanets discovered in 2021 - HD 164922 e
