= Chi Scorpii =

Orange-hued giant star in the constellation Scorpius

χ Scorpii
- Location of χ Scorpii (circled in red)

Observation data Epoch J2000 Equinox ICRS
- Constellation: Scorpius
- Right ascension: 16^{h} 13^{m} 50.906^{s}
- Declination: −11° 50′ 15.89″
- Apparent magnitude (V): 5.24

Characteristics
- Evolutionary stage: horizontal branch(57%chance) or red giant branch(43%chance)
- Spectral type: K3 III
- U−B color index: +1.54
- B−V color index: +1.39

Astrometry
Radial velocity (R_{v})	−23.61±0.1 km/s
Proper motion (μ)	RA: −4.991 mas/yr Dec.: −9.931 mas/yr
Parallax (π)	7.2874±0.0993 mas
Distance	448 ± 6 ly (137 ± 2 pc)
Absolute magnitude (M_{V})	−0.08

Details
Mass	1.22+0.13 −0.14 M_{☉}
Radius	25.92+0.78 −0.74 R_{☉}
Luminosity	179.62+11.10 −9.55 L_{☉}
Surface gravity (log g)	1.66±0.05 cgs
Temperature	4,157+11 −10 K
Metallicity [Fe/H]	−0.01±0.10 dex
Rotational velocity (v sin i)	8 km/s
Age	8.39±2.64 Gyr

Other designations
- χ Sco, 17 Scorpii, BD−11°4096, GC 21828, HD 145897, HIP 79540, HR 6048, SAO 159793, 2MASS J16135090-1150160

Database references
SIMBAD	data
Exoplanet Archive	data

Chi Scorpii, Latinized from χ Scorpii, is a single star in the zodiac constellation of Scorpius. It has an orange hue and can be faintly seen with the naked eye with an apparent visual magnitude of 5.24. Based upon parallax measurements, this star is around 448 light years from the Sun. The star is drifting closer with a radial velocity of −23.6 km/s.

This is an aging K-type giant star with a stellar classification of K3 III, which means it has exhausted the supply of hydrogen at its core. There is a 57% chance that this evolved star is on the horizontal branch and a 43% chance it is still on the red-giant branch. If it is on the former, the star is estimated to have 1.09 times the mass of the Sun, nearly 27 times the solar radius and shines with 191 times the Sun's luminosity. It is around 8 billion years old.

== Planetary system ==
One superjovian planet orbiting Chi Scorpii was detected in 2020 on a mildly eccentric orbit utilizing the radial velocity method.

The Chi Scorpii planetary system
Companion (in order from star)	Mass	Semimajor axis (AU)	Orbital period (days)	Eccentricity	Inclination (°)	Radius
b	≥4.32^{+0.15}_{−0.12} M_{J}	1.45±0.02	578.38+2.01 −2.09	0.06^{+0.03}_{−0.02}	—	—

== See also ==
- 3 Cancri
- List of exoplanets discovered in 2020
