= 3 Cancri =

Star in the constellation Cancer

Observation data Epoch J2000.0 Equinox ICRS
- Constellation: Cancer
- Right ascension: 08^{h} 00^{m} 47.30744^{s}
- Declination: +17° 18′ 31.3283″
- Apparent magnitude (V): 5.60

Characteristics
- Evolutionary stage: horizontal branch (86% chance)
- Spectral type: K3 III
- B−V color index: 1.317

Astrometry
Radial velocity (R_{v})	+39.55±0.16 km/s
Proper motion (μ)	RA: −10.403 mas/yr Dec.: −3.905 mas/yr
Parallax (π)	4.0087±0.1511 mas
Distance	810 ± 30 ly (249 ± 9 pc)
Absolute magnitude (M_{V})	−1.29

Details
Mass	2.9 M_{☉}
Radius	40 R_{☉}
Luminosity	568.61 L_{☉}
Surface gravity (log g)	2.05 cgs
Temperature	4,300 K
Rotational velocity (v sin i)	5.73 km/s

Other designations
- 3 Cnc, BD+17°1731, FK5 2618, HD 65759, HIP 39177, HR 3128, SAO 97472

Database references
SIMBAD	data

3 Cancri is a single star in the zodiac constellation of Cancer, located around 810 light years from the Sun. It is visible to the naked eye as a dim, orange-hued star with an apparent visual magnitude of 5.60. This object is moving further from the Earth with a heliocentric radial velocity of +39.5 km/s, and may be a member of the Hyades group. It is located near the ecliptic and thus is subject to lunar eclipses.

This is an aging giant star with a stellar classification of K3 III that is most likely (86% chance) on the horizontal branch. The star has 2.9 times the mass of the Sun and has expanded to 40 times the Sun's radius. It is radiating 569 times the Sun's luminosity from its enlarged photosphere at an effective temperature of 4,300 K.

== Planetary system ==
A candidate super-Jupiter exoplanet or brown dwarf orbiting 3 Cancri was detected in 2020 on a very mildly eccentric orbit using the radial velocity method.

The 3 Cancri planetary system
Companion (in order from star)	Mass	Semimajor axis (AU)	Orbital period (days)	Eccentricity	Inclination (°)	Radius
b (unconfirmed)	≥20.76+0.72 −0.73 M_{J}	2.52+0.03 −0.04	853.64+4.76 −4.73	0.04+0.04 −0.03	—	—

== See also ==
- Cancer (Chinese astronomy)
- List of stars in Cancer
- Chi Scorpii
