= TOI-763 =

G-type star in the constellation of Centaurus

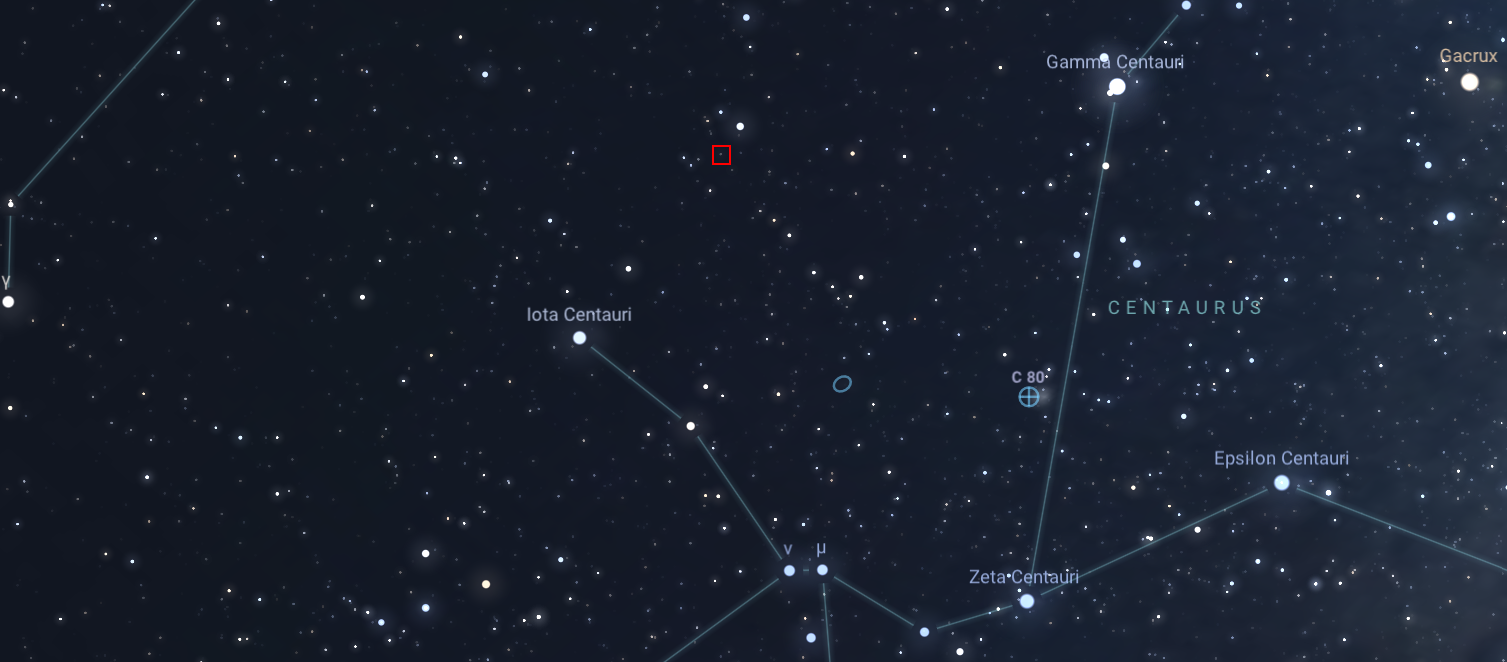
- Location of TOI-763 in the night sky. The general location of the star is marked within the red square.

Observation data Epoch J2000 Equinox J2000
- Constellation: Centaurus
- Right ascension: 12^{h} 57^{m} 52.447^{s}
- Declination: −39° 45′ 27.71″
- Apparent magnitude (V): 10.28

Characteristics
- Evolutionary stage: main sequence
- Spectral type: G

Astrometry
Radial velocity (R_{v})	−13.82±0.16 km/s
Proper motion (μ)	RA: −76.744 mas/yr Dec.: −84.721 mas/yr
Parallax (π)	10.4655±0.0183 mas
Distance	311.6 ± 0.5 ly (95.6 ± 0.2 pc)

Details
Mass	0.917±0.028 M_{☉}
Radius	0.897±0.013 R_{☉}
Luminosity	0.68 L_{☉}
Surface gravity (log g)	4.45±0.05 cgs
Temperature	5,450±60 K
Metallicity [Fe/H]	+0.01±0.05 dex
Rotation	27±16 days
Age	6.0 Gyr

Other designations
- CD−39 7945, TOI-763, TIC 178819686, 2MASS J12575245-3945275

Database references
SIMBAD	data
Exoplanet Archive	data

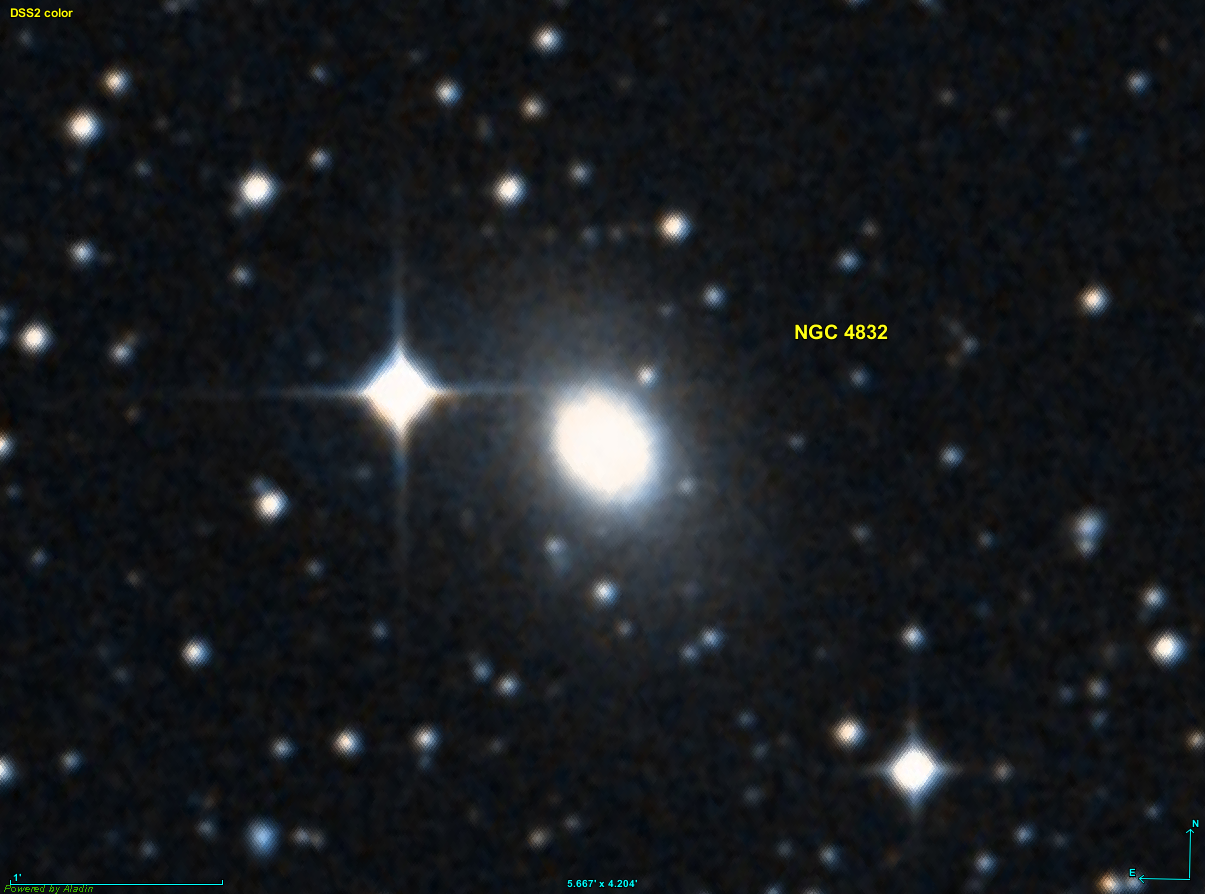
TOI-763 is the bright star to the left of the galaxy NGC 4832 in this image.

TOI-763 is a single high proper motion G-type star in the constellation of Centaurus, near the galaxy NGC 4832 in the sky. It is approximately 0.9 times the mass and radius of the Sun, with a surface temperature of 5,450±60 K and a spectral type of G7. TOI-763 is too faint to be visible to the naked eye. Based upon parallax measurements, it is located 312 light-years (95.6 parsecs) in distance from the Sun. The object is drifting towards the Sun with a radial velocity of −13.8 km/s.

== Planetary system ==
In August of 2020, two exoplanets were identified via the transit method of exoplanet detection by the Transiting Exoplanet Survey Satellite (TESS), a space telescope for NASA's Explorer program, designed to search for exoplanets. A third candidate planet is suspected based on radial velocity observations.

Neither of these two planets orbit in the habitable zone and are both believed to be sub-Neptune planets.

The TOI-763 planetary system
Companion (in order from star)	Mass	Semimajor axis (AU)	Orbital period (days)	Eccentricity	Inclination	Radius
b	9.79±0.78 M_{🜨}	0.0600±0.0006	5.6057±0.0013	0.04+0.04 −0.03	—	2.28±0.11 R_{🜨}
c	9.32±1.02 M_{🜨}	0.1011±0.0010	12.2737+0.0053 −0.0077	0.04+0.04 −0.03	—	2.63±0.12 R_{🜨}
d (unconfirmed)	≥9.54±1.59 M_{🜨}	0.2504+0.0093 −0.0105	47.7991±2.7399	~0	—	—

== See also ==
- List of exoplanets discovered in 2020
