= HD 158259 =

Star in the constellation Draco

Observation data Epoch J2000 Equinox ICRS
- Constellation: Draco
- Right ascension: 17^{h} 25^{m} 24.055^{s}
- Declination: +52° 47′ 26.47″
- Apparent magnitude (V): 6.46

Characteristics
- Evolutionary stage: Main sequence
- Spectral type: G0 (G5VmF9)

Astrometry
Radial velocity (R_{v})	13.44±0.14 km/s
Proper motion (μ)	RA: −90.678 mas/yr Dec.: −49.702 mas/yr
Parallax (π)	37.0177±0.0199 mas
Distance	88.11 ± 0.05 ly (27.01 ± 0.01 pc)
Absolute magnitude (M_{V})	4.27

Details
Mass	1.08±0.10 M_{☉}
Radius	1.3 R_{☉}
Luminosity	1.6 L_{☉}
Surface gravity (log g)	4.28 cgs
Temperature	6,068 K
Metallicity [Fe/H]	−0.20 dex
Rotation	18 days
Rotational velocity (v sin i)	3.0 km/s

Other designations
- HIP 85268, TOI-1462, TYC 3888-1886-1, GSC 03888-01886, 2MASS J17252406+5247263

Database references
SIMBAD	data
Exoplanet Archive	data

HD 158259 is a main sequence star located 88 light-years (27 parsecs) away in the northern constellation of Draco. It hosts a system of at least five planets, discovered by the SOPHIE échelle spectrograph using the radial velocity method.

== Characteristics ==
HD 158259 is a G0 star with a rotation period of 18±5 days. More detailed analysis of the spectral assigns a class of G5V, but with the metal lines of an F9 star. While initial discoveries estimated a lower stellar mass, recent evolutionary tracks from the NASA Exoplanet Archive refine the mass to 1.08±0.10 M_{☉}. Combined with its radius of about 1.21–1.3 R_{☉}, these parameters indicate that HD 158259 is likely at the main-sequence turnoff or early subgiant phase, experiencing expansion and cooling.

== Planets ==
Five planets have been confirmed orbiting HD 158259, along with one unconfirmed planet. These planets were discovered by N.C. Hara et.al. by the radial velocity method, published in Astronomy & Astrophysics in April 2020. The innermost planet, HD 158259 b, was also observed to transit the star by TESS. The planets orbit in a nearly 3:2 orbital resonance, with the period ratios 1.5758, 1.5146, 1.5296, 1.5130, and 1.4480, respectively, starting from the innermost pairing. A dynamical analysis has shown that the system is stable. One of the planets, HD 158259 b, is a super-Earth; the rest, including the unconfirmed HD 158259 g, are potentially mini-Neptunes.

The HD 158259 planetary system
Companion (in order from star)	Mass	Semimajor axis (AU)	Orbital period (days)	Eccentricity	Inclination (°)	Radius
b	2.2 M_{🜨}	0.034	2.177±0.44	<0.1	—	~1.2 R_{🜨}
c	5.6 M_{🜨}	0.046	3.432±0.00002	<0.1	—	—
d	5.4 M_{🜨}	0.060	5.198±0.008	<0.1	—	—
e	6.1 M_{🜨}	0.080	7.954±0.0016	<0.1	—	—
f	6.1 M_{🜨}	0.105	12.03±0.0028	<0.1	—	—
g (unconfirmed)	6.9 M_{🜨}	0.135	17.39±0.023	<0.1	—	—

== See also ==
- List of exoplanets discovered in 2020 - HD 158259 b, c, d, e, and f
