= HD 108236 =

G-type main sequence star in the constellation Centaurus

Observation data Epoch J2000 Equinox ICRS
- Constellation: Centaurus
- Right ascension: 12^{h} 26^{m} 17.8919^{s}
- Declination: −51° 21′ 46.216″
- Apparent magnitude (V): 9.24

Characteristics
- Evolutionary stage: main sequence
- Spectral type: G5V

Astrometry
Radial velocity (R_{v})	16.91±0.15 km/s
Proper motion (μ)	RA: −70.627 mas/yr Dec.: −49.758 mas/yr
Parallax (π)	15.4861±0.0127 mas
Distance	210.6 ± 0.2 ly (64.57 ± 0.05 pc)
Absolute magnitude (M_{V})	+5.17

Details
Mass	0.867^{+0.047}_{−0.046} M_{☉}
Radius	0.876±0.007 R_{☉}
Luminosity	0.707±0.032 L_{☉}
Surface gravity (log g)	4.49±0.11 cgs
Temperature	5660±61 K
Metallicity [Fe/H]	−0.28±0.04 dex
Age	6.7^{+3.3}_{−3.4} Gyr

Other designations
- CD−50 6971, HIP 60689, TOI-1233, TYC 8243-1948-1, GSC 08243-01948, 2MASS J12261789-5121462

Database references
SIMBAD	data
Exoplanet Archive	data

HD 108236 is a G-type main-sequence star. Its surface temperature is 5660±61 K. HD 108236 is severely depleted in heavy elements compared to the Sun, with a metallicity Fe/H index of −0.28±0.04 (52% of the Solar System), and is probably older than the Sun at an age of 6.7^{+3.3}_{−3.4} billion years.

According to WISE mission data, the star was suspected to be surrounded by a debris disk, but a reanalysis of the data rejected the debris disk hypothesis by 2014. The reason for the false positive was contamination from a nearby infrared source.

== Planetary system ==
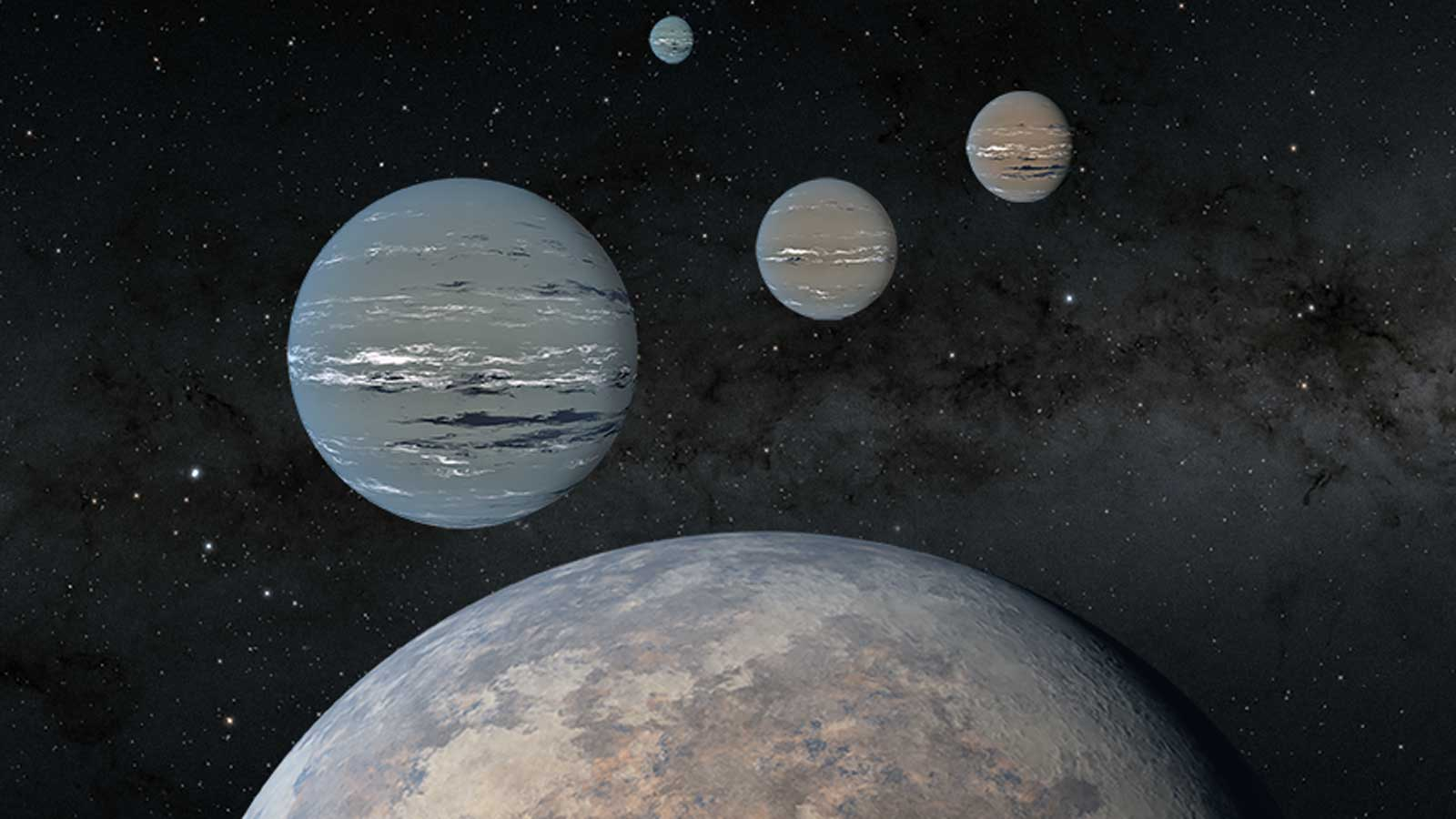
HD 108236's planets

In 2020, four planets orbiting HD 108236 were discovered by the transit method, followed by another one in 2021.

The HD 108236 planetary system
Companion (in order from star)	Mass	Semimajor axis (AU)	Orbital period (days)	Eccentricity	Inclination (°)	Radius
b	4.23^{+0.41}_{−0.39} M_{🜨}	0.0451±0.0004	3.7958785^{+0.0000076}_{−0.0000070}	0.067^{+0.025}_{−0.026}	88.23±0.32	1.587±0.028 R_{🜨}
c	8.90^{+0.67}_{−0.64} M_{🜨}	0.0626±0.0006	6.2036717^{+0.0000092}_{−0.0000100}	0.091^{+0.021}_{−0.033}	88.8±0.2	2.122±0.025 R_{🜨}
d	7.75^{+0.91}_{−0.62} M_{🜨}	0.1087±0.0010	14.175818^{+0.000024}_{−0.000023}	0.075^{+0.021}_{−0.022}	88.8±0.1	2.629±0.031 R_{🜨}
e	8.2^{+3.8}_{−1.2} M_{🜨}	0.1348±0.0012	19.5901277±0.000030	0.073^{+0.014}_{−0.017}	89.3±0.1	3.008±0.032 R_{🜨}
f	3.95^{+0.46}_{−0.32} M_{🜨}	0.1773±0.0016	29.53935^{+0.00012}_{−0.00014}	0.024^{+0.024}_{−0.016}	89.07±0.03	1.89±0.04 R_{🜨}

== See also ==
- List of exoplanets discovered in 2020 - HD 108236 b through e
- List of exoplanets discovered in 2021 - HD 108236 f
