= TOI-561 =

Metal-poor orange dwarf

Observation data Epoch J2000.0 Equinox ICRS
- Constellation: Sextans
- Right ascension: 09^{h} 52^{m} 44.1851^{s}
- Declination: +06° 12′ 58.921″
- Apparent magnitude (V): 10.25

Characteristics
- Evolutionary stage: main sequence
- Spectral type: G9V

Astrometry
| Proper motion (μ) | RA: 124.612 mas/yr Dec.: −61.279 mas/yr |
| Parallax (π) | 11.8342±0.0208 mas |
| Distance | 275.6 ± 0.5 ly (84.5 ± 0.1 pc) |

Details
| Mass | 0.785±0.018 M_{☉} |
| Radius | 0.849±0.007 R_{☉} |
| Luminosity | 0.522±0.017 L_{☉} |
| Surface gravity (log g) | 4.50±0.12 cgs |
| Temperature | 5,372±70 K |
| Metallicity [Fe/H] | −0.40±0.05 dex |
| Rotational velocity (v sin i) | <2 km/s |
| Age | 10±3 Gyr |

Other designations
- 2MASS J09524454+0612589, TYC 243-1528-1, GSC 00243-01528

Database references
| SIMBAD | data |
| Exoplanet Archive | data |

TOI-561 is an old, metal-poor, Sun-like star, known to have multiple small exoplanets orbiting it. It is an orange dwarf, estimated to be 10.5 billion years old, and about 79% the mass and 85% the radius of the Sun. It is located in the constellation of Sextans, near the border with Leo.

In January 2021, a team led by Lauren Weiss of the University of Hawaii at Manoa announced that, using data from NASA's Transiting Exoplanet Survey Satellite, they had found a Super-Earth in a very close orbit, as well as two outer Sub-Neptunes. The innermost planet, TOI-561 b, orbits in under one Earth day. Another team led by Gaia Lacedelli of the University of Padua independently announced the discovery in a paper published in December 2020. However, the two papers disagree on the structure of the system. While the innermost two planets were confirmed from data by both papers, Weiss proposes only a single third planet in a 16.3-day orbit, while Lacedelli argues that the system instead contains two further planets, in wider orbits of 25.6 and 77 days.

== Discovery and nomenclature ==
TOI-561 is also designated 2MASS J09524454+0612589 in the 2MASS catalog and TIC 377064495 in the TESS Input Catalog. When its planets were first identified, it was renamed TOI-561, with TOI standing for "TESS Object of Interest".

The planetary system was independently confirmed and characterized by Lacedelli et al. (2020) and Weiss et al. (2021). Lacedelli et al. found evidence for four exoplanets: the Ultra-Short-Period (USP) Super-Earth TOI-561 b, and three Sub-Neptunes designated TOI-561 c, d, and e. The two planets TOI-561 d and TOI-561 e were originally listed as a single planet with a period of 16 days on ExoFOP, but Lacedelli could not detect a planet in that orbit using radial velocity data from HARPS, and instead interpreted it as two separate transits coming from planets correlating with periods of 25.6 and 77.2 days found by HARPS.

In January 2021, Lauren Weiss and her team's study on TOI-561 was published. Unlike Lacedelli, they kept the 16-day signal and designated it TOI-561 d; it is referred to as TOI-561 f on NASA's Exoplanet Archive to avoid confusion with the TOI-561 d from Lacedelli's paper.

== Characteristics ==
TOI-561 is a yellow or orange star approximately 80% the size of the Sun. According to Lacedelli, it is 85% the radius and 79% the mass of the Sun, with a temperature of 5455 Kelvin. Weiss found the star to be 83.2% the radius and 80.5% the mass of the Sun, with a temperature of 5326 K and a luminosity just over half that of the Sun. Both teams found that TOI-561 has an extremely low abundance of metals, or any element heavier than hydrogen or helium, and is very old; Weiss calculates an age of roughly 10 billion years. It is also a part of the Galactic thick disk and is the first of those stars to have confirmed transiting exoplanets.

== Planetary system ==
Depending on the study, TOI-561 has either 3 (Weiss) or 4 (Lacedelli) planets. The discrepancy comes from different interpretations of the two transit events associated with TOI-561 d in Weiss 2020. Only two transits were observed by TESS, and a third transit for a 16-day period would have occurred in the middle of a data gap. Weiss attributes the two transits to that of a single Sub-Neptune sized planet. However, in the radial velocity analysis by Lacedelli 2020, the 16-day signal is not recovered, but there are two additional signals of 26 and 77 days that they attribute to one of the two transits each. The follow-up study in 2022 has confirmed the architecture of four-planet system. Additional, fifth planet on the 473^{+36}_{−25} days orbit is suspected. The orbital parameters were refined with additional observations from CHEOPS and TESS in 2024, further confirming four transiting planets and a fifth non-transiting candidate.

The TOI-561 planetary system
| Companion (in order from star) | Mass | Semimajor axis (AU) | Orbital period (days) | Eccentricity | Inclination (°) | Radius |
|---|---|---|---|---|---|---|
| b | 2.02±0.23 M_{🜨} | 0.01064±0.00016 | 0.4465697±0.0000003 | 0 | 87.0^{+2.0}_{−2.1} | 1.397±0.027 R_{🜨} |
| c | 5.93±0.67 M_{🜨} | 0.0889±0.0013 | 10.778838±0.000018 | 0.023^{+0.034}_{−0.017} | 89.61^{+0.27}_{−0.33} | 2.865±0.041 R_{🜨} |
| d | 13.33±0.98 M_{🜨} | 0.1587±0.0024 | 25.71268±0.00012 | 0.111^{+0.050}_{−0.039} | 89.51^{+0.25}_{−0.14} | 2.615±0.059 R_{🜨} |
| e | 12.4±1.4 M_{🜨} | 0.3300±0.0050 | 77.14400±0.00027 | 0.074^{+0.044}_{−0.039} | 89.864^{+0.095}_{−0.094} | 2.517±0.045 R_{🜨} |
| f (candidate) | 19.1±2.7 M_{🜨} | 1.043±0.035 | 433^{+20}_{−18} | 0.083^{+0.080}_{−0.058} | — | — |

=== TOI-561 b ===
TOI-561 b is an ultra-short period Super-Earth with a radius of roughly 1.4 Earths. It has an extremely short orbital period of under 11 hours, less than half of an Earth day, resulting in an equilibrium temperature of 2,480 ± 200 K (2,207 ± 200 °C; 4,004 ± 360 °F). The planet is believed to be far too small and irradiated to hold onto its primordial Hydrogen and Helium envelope. However, the composition of the planet varies greatly between the two studies. Weiss 2020 found a mass of around 3.2 Earths and a density of 5.5 grams per cubic centimetre, around the same as Earth and implying a rocky but iron-poor composition. Lacedelli 2020, on the other hand, found a mass of only 1.59 Earths and a density of 3.0 grams per cubic centimetre, abnormally low for a planet of its size and suggesting a composition made of 50% or more of water. Even their higher mass estimate of 1.83 Earths is still consistent with a water-world. With an insolation 5,100 times greater than Earth, TOI-561 b should have lost its gaseous layer and have little volatiles, so the authors believe if the planet has a significant amount of water, it has been evaporated into a puffy steam atmosphere that makes the planet seem larger, less dense, and more water-rich. If it is an extremely water-rich world, TOI-561 b would prove formation scenarios about Super-Earths forming beyond the "Snow Line" and migrating inwards.

=== TOI-561 c ===
TOI-561 c is a Mini-Neptune orbiting every 10.7 days with an equilibrium temperature of 860 ± 70 K (586.9 ± 70.0 °C; 1,088.3 ± 126.0 °F). With a radius of 2.9 Earths and a mass of 5.4 to 7.0 Earths, the planet has a Neptune-like density of 1.3 to 1.6 grams per cubic centimetre, implying that it is a small gas planet with a similar composition, albeit far hotter and closer to its star than our system's ice giants.

=== TOI-561 d/e/f ===
Two additional transit events were observed by TESS. The original planet candidate from the SPOC pipeline included both transits with a period of 16 days. Lacedelli et al. failed to find a significant radial velocity signal at that period, but found two others with periods of 25.6 and 77.2 days, and also noticed differences in the shape, duration, and depth of the two individual transits. They concluded that the 16-day signal was instead two separate single transit events from similarly sized but different planets, which corresponded with the additional signals found in their radial velocity analysis. They designated these planets TOI-561 d (25.6 days) and TOI-561 e (77.2 days). According to their analysis, both planets are slightly smaller than TOI-561 c at 2.5 and 2.7 Earths, but are both significantly more massive, at 12 and 16 times the mass of Earth. TOI-561 d and TOI-561 e are much denser at 4.1 and 4.6 grams per cubic centimetre, respectively. These are compatible with water-world compositions of >50% water by mass, or a thin H/He envelope on top of a water mantle and rocky core. Weiss et al. interprets the two transits as a single planet, and also interprets an extremely faint radial velocity signal corresponding to about 3 Earth masses; however, it is too imprecise to gain an accurate density estimate, and this scenario could be incorrect. To distinguish this from the previous reported TOI-561 e, the 16-day planet from Weiss et al. has been designated TOI-561 f on the Exoplanet Archive.
