= TOI-561 b =

Ultra-short period exoplanet orbiting TOI-561

Discovery
- Discovered by: Transiting Exoplanet Survey Satellite
- Discovery date: 2020
- Detection method: Transit

Orbital characteristics
- Semi-major axis: 0.01064±0.00016 au
- Orbital period (sidereal): 0.4465697±0.0000003 d
- Inclination: 87.0°+2.0° −2.1°
- Star: TOI-561

Physical characteristics
- Mean radius: 1.397±0.027 R_{🜨}
- Mass: 2.02±0.23 M_{🜨}
- Mean density: 4.1±0.5 g/cm^{3}
- Albedo: 0.74+0.08 −0.10
- Temperature: 2,048+193 −206 K (dayside); 1,089+175 −379 K (nightside)

TOI-561 b is an ultra-short period super-Earth exoplanet orbiting TOI-561, a Sun-like star. The innermost planet in its planetary system, it orbits extremely close to its star, completing an orbit within 11 hours. This results in a dayside temperature exceeding 2000 Kelvin. With a radius of around 1.4 Earth radii and a mass of around 2 Earth masses, this planet has a relatively low density for ultra-short period planets, possibly suggesting iron-poor composition and/or a envelope of low density materials, the latter of which is supported by the detection of a volatile-rich atmosphere which transports heat from the dayside to the nightside.

== Characteristics ==
=== Composition ===
TOI-561 b orbits an old, metal-poor star, which has lower iron abundance relative to silicon and magnesium than the Sun. This may result in a smaller dense iron core, and hence a lower bulk density for the planet.

The existence of an atmosphere also suggests that it may be enveloped in a thick atmosphere. Given its small mass and irradiation, it is probably unable to hold onto its primordial hydrogen and helium envelope. Instead, the atmosphere is expected to comprise of volatiles such as water or carbon dioxide.

=== Atmosphere ===
James Webb Space Telescope measurements of dayside emission spectrum and full-orbit phase curve reveal moderately efficient global heat transfer from dayside to nightside. This is inconsistent with a "bare rock" planet with no atmosphere, or one with an atmosphere made entirely of evaporated rock, and confirms the existence of a thick atmosphere of volatiles on TOI-561 b.

The existence of a volatile-rich atmosphere on TOI-561 b is surprising, as such highly irradiated super-Earths are expected to have completely lost volatiles from intense heat. Possible explanations include outgassing from the magma ocean, which may act as a reservoir which limit volatile loss to space, and/or a volatile-rich formation.

TOI-561 b's high Bond albedo suggests the presence of reflective clouds in its atmosphere, possibly mineral clouds condensed from rock vapor evaporating from the planet's magma ocean.
