= HD 190007 =

Star in the constellation Aquila

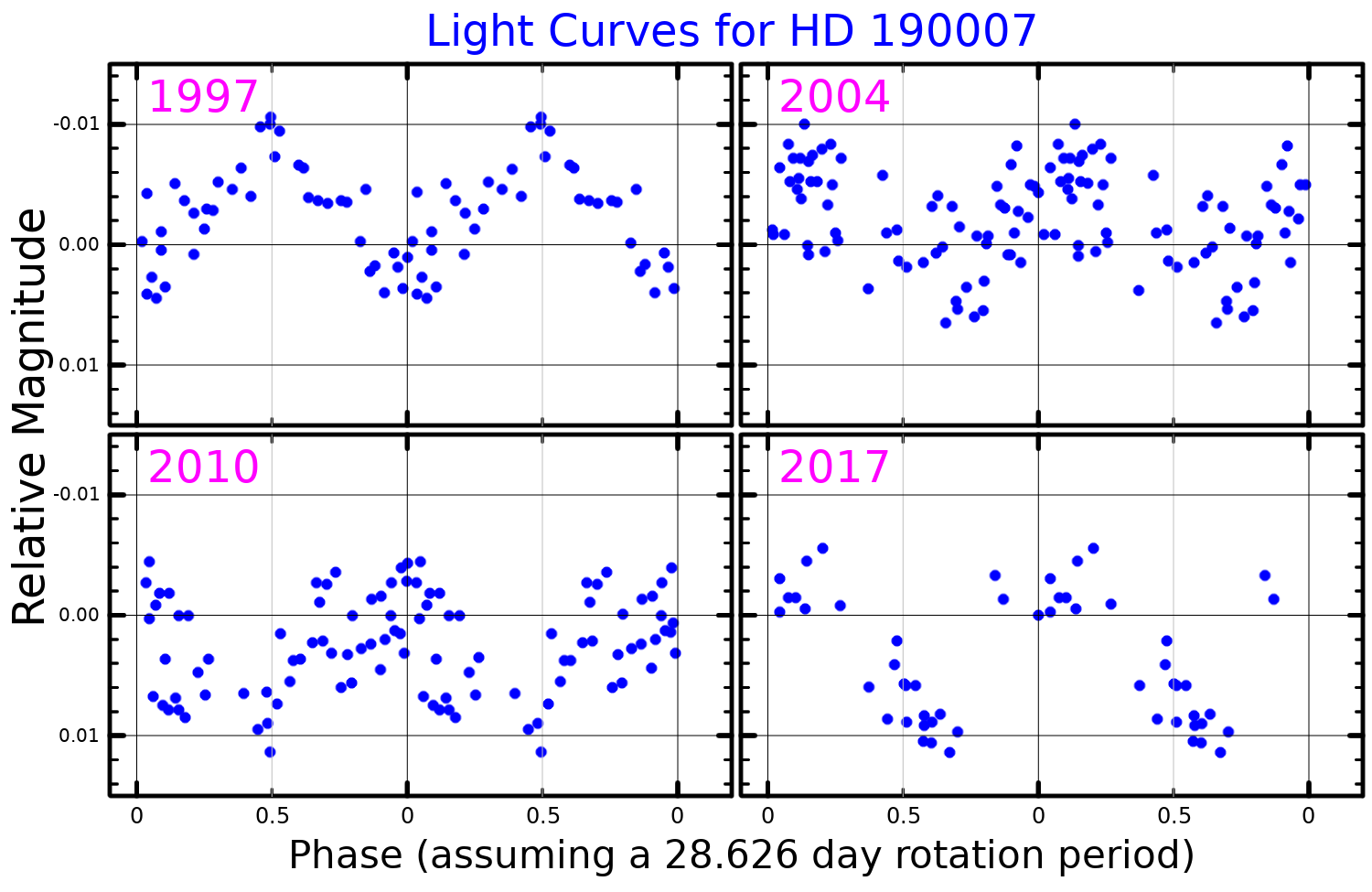
- Four representative light curves for HD 190007, adapted from Burt et al. (2020)

Observation data Epoch J2000 Equinox ICRS
- Constellation: Aquila
- Right ascension: 20^{h} 02^{m} 47.04569^{s}
- Declination: +03° 19′ 34.2658″
- Apparent magnitude (V): 7.46

Characteristics
- Evolutionary stage: main sequence
- Spectral type: K5 V
- U−B color index: +1.09
- B−V color index: +1.11
- Variable type: BY Dra

Astrometry
Radial velocity (R_{v})	−30.268±0.0013 km/s
Proper motion (μ)	RA: −90.383 mas/yr Dec.: 119.430 mas/yr
Parallax (π)	78.6465±0.0198 mas
Distance	41.47 ± 0.01 ly (12.715 ± 0.003 pc)
Absolute magnitude (M_{V})	6.91

Details
Mass	0.77±0.02 M_{☉}
Radius	0.80 R_{☉}
Luminosity	0.24 L_{☉}
Surface gravity (log g)	4.50 cgs
Temperature	4,610±20 K
Metallicity [Fe/H]	0.16 dex
Rotation	28.626±0.046 d

Other designations
- V1654 Aql, BD+02°4076, GJ 775, HD 190007, HIP 98698, SAO 125379

Database references
SIMBAD	data
ARICNS	data

HD 190007, also known as Gliese 775, is a star with a close orbiting exoplanet in the constellation of Aquila. Parallax measurements by Gaia put the star at a distance of 41.5 light-years (12.7 parsecs) away from the Sun. It is drifting closer with a radial velocity of −30.3 km/s, and is predicted to come within 11.8 light-years in 375,000 years. The star has an absolute magnitude of 6.91, but at its present distance the apparent visual magnitude is 7.46, which is too faint to be viewed with the naked eye.

The variability of the brightness of HD 190007 was discovered by George Wesley Lockwood et al. from data taken during a photometry program at Lowell Observatory carried out from 1984 through 1995. It was given its variable star designation, V1654 Aquilae, in 1997.

The spectrum of HD 190007 matches a K-type main-sequence star with a stellar classification of K5 V. It is classified as a BY Draconis variable, showing a moderate level of magnetic activity in its chromosphere with a suspected activity cycle lasting 13.7 years. The star displays a mild enhancement of metals and its age is uncertain. It has 77% of the mass of the Sun, 80% of the Sun's radius, and is spinning with a rotation period of 28.6 days. HD 190007 is radiating 24% of the luminosity of the Sun from its photosphere at an effective temperature of 4,610 K.

== Planetary system ==
The exoplanet HD 190007 b on a close orbit was first detected in 2020 by the radial-velocity method. Between 2015 and 2019, the Roque de los Muchachos Observatory in the Canary Islands observed HD 190007 to accumulate 37 spectrographs. This, combined with 33 spectrographs from the W. M. Keck Observatory in Hawaii over 6 years (1998 to 2014), flux measurements from the Fairborn Observatory in Arizona over 20 years, and a two-minute cadence with the Transiting Exoplanet Survey Satellite in 2022 provided the data to update the exoplanetary parameters by M. Stalport and associates in 2023.

As the inclination of the orbital plane is uncertain, only a lower bound on the exoplanet mass can be determined. It has at least 15.5 times the mass of the Earth. It is orbiting close to its parent star with a moderate eccentricity and a period of just 11.7 days.

The HD 190007 planetary system
Companion (in order from star)	Mass	Semimajor axis (AU)	Orbital period (days)	Eccentricity	Inclination (°)	Radius
b	≥15.5+1.2 −1.3 M_{🜨}	0.092±0.0008	11.724128(99)	0.136+0.085 −0.080	—	—

== See also ==
- List of exoplanets discovered in 2023 – HD 190007 b
