= Carole Ann Haswell =

British astrophysicist, exoplanet researcher

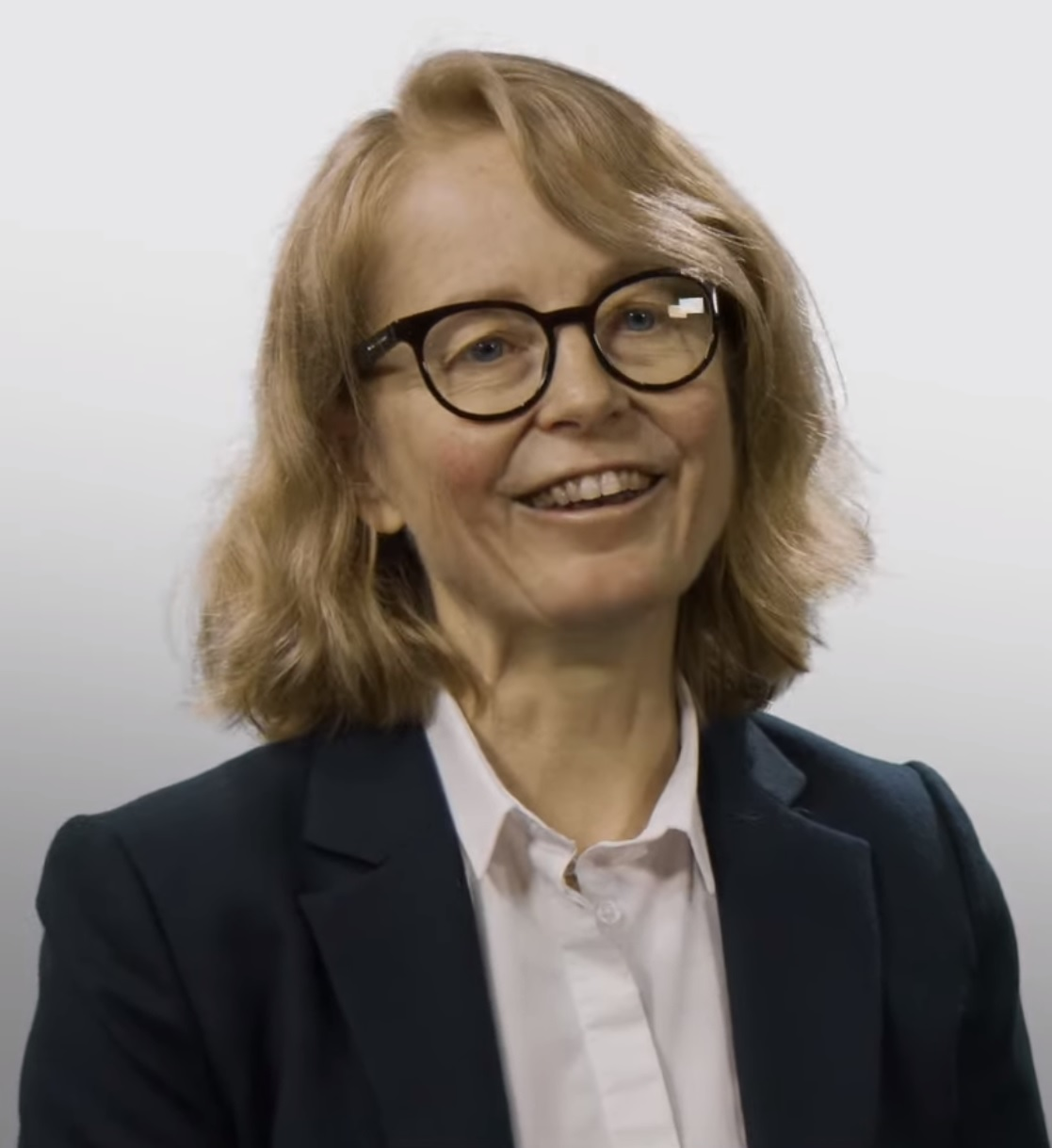
- Haswell in an Open University video in 2019
- Education: University of Texas at Austin (PhD), University of Oxford (BSc)
- Scientific career
- Workplaces: Open University; Space Telescope Science Institute; Columbia University; University of Sussex
- Thesis: The Black Hole Candidate Binary A0620-00. (1992)

Carole Ann Haswell is a British astrophysicist and current Professor of Astrophysics and Head of Astronomy at the Open University. She is a Fellow of the Royal Astronomical Society. She has been involved in the detection of several exoplanets, including Barnard's Star b.

== Early life and education ==
Haswell was born in Saltburn-by-the-Sea, North Yorkshire, and grew up in Dormanstown. Her father worked on an ammonia recovery plant at Imperial Chemical Industries. She became interested in space as a child, when her father told her about the Apollo astronauts as they gazed at the Moon while on Redcar beach. Although she originally wanted to be an astronaut, she realised at the age of ten that this was impractical.

She attended Huntcliff School where she worked towards her GCE Ordinary Levels. Whilst a student at Prior Pursglove and Stockton Sixth Form College, Haswell was interested in art, mathematics and physics, and was a fan of the television show Star Trek. One of her physics teachers was rumoured to be biased against girls, and despite Haswell achieving the highest grades possible in her A-level exams, refused to write her a reference to study physics at university. She eventually studied mathematics at the University of Oxford, but wanted to apply mathematics to the real world and became tired of abstract proofs.

Haswell eventually spoke to Donald Blackwell who helped her transfer courses, and enrolled on a physics degree at University College, Oxford. During her time as an undergraduate student, Haswell was President of the Oxford University Astronomical Society and rowed in the Summer Eights. Haswell earned her doctorate at the University of Texas at Austin, where she worked on black hole binaries. She attended the Hubble Space Telescope launch in 1990. She later joined the Space Telescope Science Institute, where she worked on accretion flow and multi-wavelength observations.

== Research and career ==
In 1994, Haswell moved to Columbia University, where she worked on black hole X-ray transients and cataclysmic variable stars. She was made a lecturer at the Barnard College where one of her students was Lauryn Hill. Haswell moved back to the United Kingdom in 1996 and was made a lecturer at the University of Sussex.

Since 1999, she has been at the Open University, at first still working on black holes and accreting binary stars and switching to exoplanet research in 2003. Early work on exoplanets was not well funded, and Haswell has spoken about using second hand Canon camera lenses to make suitable telescopes.

First working on accreting binary stars, and then exoplanets. In particular, Haswell studies short period exoplanets. Since 2012 she has led the Dispersed Matter Planet Project, which involves the analysis of light from nearby stars to identify which host mass-losing planets.

In 2018, Haswell was part of the team that was first to identify a planet around Barnard's Star, the closest single (non-binary) star to Earth, a red dwarf star that is six light years away from Earth. Using the radial velocity method, the team discovered Barnard's Star b. The planetary system around Barnard's Star touches on the edge of the Oort cloud. Barnard's Star b has a mass three times that of Earth and orbits Barnard's Star in 233 days. Haswell has predicted that the planet may have a similar surface temperature to Europa.

In 2019, Haswell used the High Accuracy Radial Velocity Planet Searcher (HARPS) to discover six extraordinarily hot exoplanets (with surface temperatures between 1100 and 1800 °C). At temperatures this high the atmosphere and surface levels of the planet can be lost, and the materials disperse into a thin sheet of gas. The gas filters the light from nearby stars, which allowed Haswell and colleagues to study the chemical composition of the atmosphere of the gas sheet. The planets have masses equivalent to 2.6 times the mass of the Earth with almost half the mass of Jupiter. Haswell has proposed that these planets could be used to understand the geology of the rocky planets in Earth's solar system.

She is part of the team for CHaracterising ExOPlanets Satellite (CHEOPS), which will examine known exoplanets to improve our understanding of their sizes. CHEOPS, which features a 35 cm telescope, launched in December 2019.

=== Public engagement and academic service ===
Haswell has been featured in a Royal Astronomical Society exhibition on women fellows. She regularly provides expert opinion to the national media and is involved with various outreach programmes through the International Astronomical Union. Haswell was awarded the Open University Outreach and Public Engagement Award for her work targeted at people with low science capital in Teesside.

== Personal life ==
Haswell has a daughter. She is interested in the stock market and has used her understanding of astrophysics to buy and sell stocks.

== Publications ==
Haswell's publications include:

- Haswell, Carole A. (2002). "Echoes in X-ray binaries". Monthly Notices of the Royal Astronomical Society. 334 (2): 426–434. arXiv:astro-ph/0204018. Bibcode:2002MNRAS.334..426O. doi:10.1046/j.1365-8711.2002.05530.x.
- Haswell, Carole A. (2012). "Near-ultraviolet absorption, chromospheric activity, and star-planet interactions in the WASP-12 system". The Astrophysical Journal. 760 (1): 79. arXiv:1301.1860. Bibcode:2012ApJ...760...79H. doi:10.1088/0004-637X/760/1/79. hdl:2381/36630. S2CID 12119533.
- Haswell, Carole (2010). Transiting Exoplanets. Cambridge University Press. ISBN 978-0-521-19183-8.
