= Nu Ophiuchi =

Star in the constellation Ophiuchus

ν Ophiuchi
- Location of ν Ophiuchi (circled)

Observation data Epoch J2000 Equinox ICRS
- Constellation: Ophiuchus
- Right ascension: 17^{h} 59^{m} 01.59191^{s}
- Declination: −09° 46′ 25.081″
- Apparent magnitude (V): +3.332

Characteristics
- Spectral type: K0 IIIa CN –1
- U−B color index: +0.873
- B−V color index: +0.999

Astrometry
Radial velocity (R_{v})	13.19±0.04 km/s
Proper motion (μ)	RA: −9.48 mas/yr Dec.: −116.69 mas/yr
Parallax (π)	21.64±0.26 mas
Distance	151 ± 2 ly (46.2 ± 0.6 pc)
Absolute magnitude (M_{V})	–0.19

Details
Mass	2.88±0.12 M_{☉}
Radius	13.85±0.17 R_{☉}
Luminosity	108.2±6 L_{☉}
Surface gravity (log g)	2.60±0.03 cgs
Temperature	5,000±63 K
Metallicity [Fe/H]	0.05±0.07 dex
Rotational velocity (v sin i)	2.1 km/s
Age	450±70 Myr

Other designations
- Sinistra, ν Oph, 64 Oph, BD−09 4632, FK5 673, HD 163917, HIP 88048, HR 6698, SAO 142004, 2MASS J17590160-0946249

Database references
SIMBAD	data
Exoplanet Archive	data

Nu Ophiuchi (ν Oph, ν Ophiuchi) is a star in the equatorial constellation of Ophiuchus. The apparent visual magnitude is +3.3, making it one of the brighter members of this constellation. Based upon parallax measurements made by the Hipparcos satellite, this star is located at a distance of about 150 light-years (46 parsecs).

== Nomenclature ==
Nu Ophiuchi (Latinized from ν Ophiuchi, abbreviated ν Oph) is the star's Bayer designation. This star is sometimes called by the name Sinistra, meaning left side in Latin, usually in an astrological context. Astronomer Jim Kaler recommended not using this name, and instead sticks to the Bayer designation only.

In Chinese astronomy, the star is part of 天市左垣 (Tiān Shì Zuǒ Yuán), meaning Left Wall of Heavenly Market Enclosure. The stars in this group include ν Ophiuchi, δ Herculis, λ Herculis, μ Herculis, ο Herculis, 112 Herculis, ζ Aquilae, θ^{1} Serpentis, η Serpentis, ξ Serpentis and η Ophiuchi. Consequently, ν Ophiuchi itself is known as 天市左垣九 (Tiān Shì Zuǒ Yuán jiǔ, English: the Ninth Star of Left Wall of Heavenly Market Enclosure), and represents the state Yan (燕), together with ζ Capricorni in the Twelve States constellation.

== Properties ==
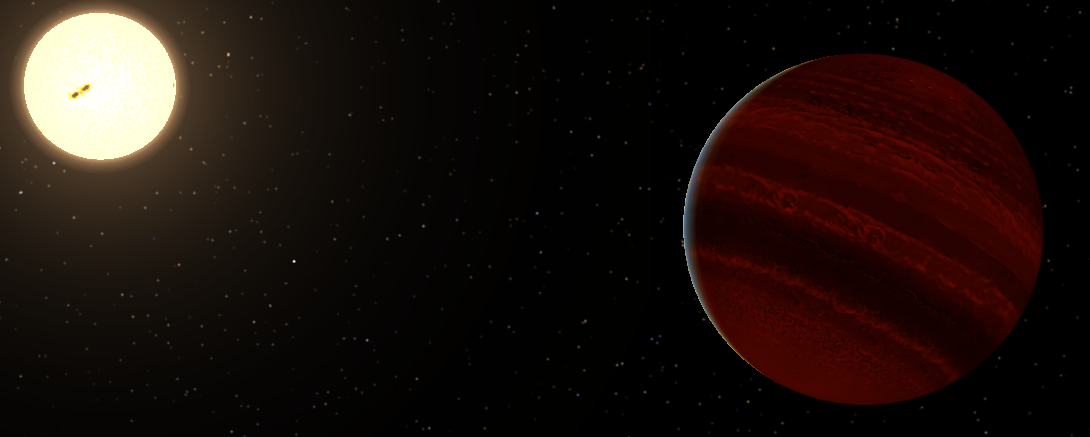
Artist's impression of Nu Ophiuchi and its brown dwarf companion Nu Ophiuchi b

Nu Ophiuchi has about three times the mass of the Sun and is roughly 450 million years old. The spectrum of the star matches a stellar classification of K0 IIIa, indicating it is a giant star that has exhausted the supply of hydrogen at its core and evolved away from the main sequence of stars. Unusually, it displays an anomalously low abundance of cyanogen for a star of its type. The star's outer envelope has expanded to around 14 times the Sun's radius and now radiates with a luminosity 108 times that of the Sun. This energy is emitted from its outer envelope at an effective temperature of 5,000 K, giving it the cool, orange hue of a K-type star.

This star is following an orbit through the galaxy that carries it between 23.4–29.2 kly (7.2–9.0 kpc) from the Galactic Center. As a probable member of the Milky Way's thin disk population, it has a low orbital inclination that carries it no more than about 100 ly (31 pc) above the galactic plane.

== Companions ==
This is not a binary star system in the sense of having a gravitationally-bound stellar companion. However, in November 2003, a brown dwarf companion called Nu Ophiuchi b was discovered by the radial velocity method. This sub-stellar companion has at least 21.9 times the mass of Jupiter and takes 536 days (1.47 years) to complete an orbit. A second brown dwarf companion was discovered in 2010, orbiting further from the star with a period of 3,169 days (8.68 years). These were confirmed in 2012. The two brown dwarfs are locked in a 6:1 orbital resonance, implying that they likely formed like planets from a circumstellar disk around the star.

The inclinations and true masses of both bodies were measured using astrometry in 2026. Their orbits are somewhat misaligned with each other, at 46°+27°
−24°.

The Nu Ophiuchi planetary system
Companion (in order from star)	Mass	Semimajor axis (AU)	Orbital period (years)	Eccentricity	Inclination (°)	Radius
b	24.2+6.4 −2.8 M_{J}	1.77+0.07 −0.06	1.45081 ± 0.00016	0.124±0.003	84+36 −32	—
c	26.8+4.3 −2.9 M_{J}	5.85+0.21 −0.23	8.693 ± 0.012	0.185±0.006	64+16 −12	—

== See also ==
- Tau Geminorum
