= Zeta Aquilae =

Binary star in the constellation Aquila

ζ Aquilae
- Location of ζ Aquilae (circled)

Observation data Epoch J2000 Equinox ICRS
- Constellation: Aquila
- Right ascension: 19^{h} 05^{m} 24.60802^{s}
- Declination: +13° 51′ 48.5182″
- Apparent magnitude (V): 2.983

Characteristics
- Evolutionary stage: main sequence
- Spectral type: A0 Vn
- U−B color index: +0.080
- B−V color index: +0.009

Astrometry
Radial velocity (R_{v})	−25 km/s
Proper motion (μ)	RA: −0.25 mas/yr Dec.: −95.56 mas/yr
Parallax (π)	39.28±0.16 mas
Distance	83.0 ± 0.3 ly (25.5 ± 0.1 pc)
Absolute magnitude (M_{V})	+0.96

Details

A
Mass	2.53±0.16 M_{☉}
Radius	2.762 (equatorial); 2.148 (polar) R_{☉}
Luminosity	52.5+2.5 −2.4 L_{☉}
Surface gravity (log g)	3.60 (equatorial); 4.15 (polar) cgs
Temperature	8,680 (equatorial); 10,952 (polar) K
Metallicity [Fe/H]	−0.52±0.04 dex
Rotation	10.575 hours
Rotational velocity (v sin i)	306+20 −5 km/s
Age	100±50 Myr

B
Mass	0.50 M_{☉}

Other designations
- Okab (primary), Zeta Aql, ζ Aql, 17 Aql, BD+13 3899, FK5 716, GJ 4095, HD 177724, HIP 93747, HR 7235, SAO 104461, WDS J19054+1352A

Database references
SIMBAD	data

Zeta Aquilae is a binary star system in the equatorial constellation of Aquila. Its name is a Bayer designation that is Latinized from ζ Aquilae, and abbreviated Zeta Aql or ζ Aql. This system is readily visible with the naked eye as a point of light, having a combined apparent visual magnitude of 2.983. Based on parallax measurements obtained during the Hipparcos mission, it is approximately 83 light-years (25 parsecs) distant from the Sun. It is a candidate member of the TW Hydrae association of co-moving stars.

Zeta Aquilae's two components can be designated Zeta Aquilae A and B. The former is officially named Okab, pronounced /ˈoʊkæb/, the traditional name for the system. Zeta Aquilae has a number of companions listed and together they are designated WDS J19054+1352. As the primary star of this group, Zeta Aquilae also bears the designation WDS J19054+1352A. The companions are then designated WDS J19054+1352B, C, D and E.

== Nomenclature ==
ζ Aquilae, Latinised to Zeta Aquilae, is the binary's Bayer designation. The designations of the two components as Zeta Aquilae A and B derive from the convention used by the Washington Multiplicity Catalog (WMC) for multiple star systems, and adopted by the International Astronomical Union (IAU). WDS J19054+1352 is the entry of the wider system of which Zeta Aquilae is a member in the Washington Double Star Catalog.

Zeta and Epsilon Aquilae together bore the traditional name Deneb el Okab, from an Arabic term ذنب العقاب Dhanab al-ʽuqāb "the tail of the eagle", which they mark (Aquila is Latin for 'eagle'). In 2016, the IAU organized a Working Group on Star Names (WGSN) to catalog and standardize proper names for stars. The WGSN decided to attribute proper names to individual stars rather than entire multiple systems. It approved the name Okab for the component Zeta Aquilae A on 1 June 2018 and it is now so included in the List of IAU-approved Star Names.

Epsilon and Zeta Aquilae also bore the Mandarin names Woo /ˈwuː/ and Yuë /ˈjuːeɪ/, derived from and representing the old states Wú (吳) (located at the mouth of the Yangtze River) and Yuè (越) (in Zhejiang province).

In the catalogue of stars in the Calendarium of Al Achsasi Al Mouakket, Zeta Aquilae was designated Dzeneb al Tair (from the Arabic ذنب الطائر ðanab aṭ-ṭā’ir), which was translated into Latin as Cauda (Vulturis) Volantis, meaning the eagle's tail.

In Chinese, 天市左垣 (Tiān Shì Zuǒ Yuán), meaning Left Wall of Heavenly Market Enclosure, refers to an asterism which represents eleven old states in China and is marking the left borderline of the enclosure, consisting of Zeta Aquilae; Delta, Lambda, Mu, Omicron and 112 Herculis; Theta¹ and Eta Serpentis; Nu Ophiuchi, Xi Serpentis and Eta Ophiuchi. Consequently, the Chinese name for Zeta Aquilae itself is 天市左垣六 (Tiān Shì Zuǒ Yuán liù, English: the Sixth Star of Left Wall of Heavenly Market Enclosure), representing the state mentioned above.

== Properties ==
The primary, designated component A, has a stellar classification of A0 Vn, with the luminosity class 'V' indicating is a main sequence star that is generating energy through the nuclear fusion of hydrogen at its core. It has more than double the mass of the Sun and is radiating more than 39 times the Sun's luminosity. The effective temperature of the star's outer envelope is about 9620 K, which gives it the white hue typical of A-type stars. The estimated age of this star is 50–150 million years.

This star is rotating rapidly, with a projected rotational velocity of 306 km s^{−1} giving a lower bound on the azimuthal velocity along the equator. As a result, it has an oblate shape, with its equatorial radius measuring 2.76 solar radii (R_{☉}) and its polar radius measuring 2.15 R_{☉}. Gravity darkening due to the fast rotation also make its effective temperature and surface gravity vary across latitudes, from 8,680 K and 3.60 cgs in the equator to 11,000 K and 4.15 cgs in the poles. Because of the Doppler effect, this rapid rotation makes the absorption lines in the star's spectrum broaden and smear out, as indicated by the 'n' suffix in the stellar class. It likely exhibits differential rotation along different latitudes. The star is rotating nearly edge-on relative to Earth, with an inclination of 85°.

Astronomers use Zeta Aquilae as a telluric standard star. That is, the spectrum of this star is used to correct for telluric contamination from the Earth's atmosphere when examining the spectra of neighboring stars. Observation of this star in the infrared band during the 2MASS survey appeared to reveal excess emission. However, the distribution of this emission could not be readily explained by a conjectured disk of circumstellar dust. Instead, in 2009 the detection was ascribed to errors caused by saturation of the near-infrared detectors.

Precise infrared interferometric observations during 2008–2011 was able to resolve infrared emission within the first astronomical unit from the star. A 2017 study proposed hot exozodiacal dust extended from 0.14 to 1.0 au with a mass of (1.79–10.2)×10^{−9} M_{🜨}. Scenarios to explain the presence of this dust include a collision between orbiting bodies, or the sublimation of a super comet.

=== Companions ===
The primary forms a binary star system with component B. This is a magnitude 12.0 star at an angular separation of 7.20″ along a position angle of 46°, as of 2009. The pair have a projected separation of 185.1 AU. The secondary has an estimated mass equal to one half the mass of the Sun. The 16th magnitude star WDS J19054+1352E is also considered to be a co-moving companion with a mass of 0.14 M_{☉}, at a projected separation of 38,000 AU from the primary.

The Washington Double Star Catalog lists a second 12th magnitude star at 160" (WDS J19054+1352C) plus an 11th magnitude star separated by 200" (WDS J19054+1352D). The Catalog of Components of Double and Multiple Stars lists the two 12th magnitude companions at 6.5" and 160".
