= Eta Ophiuchi =

Star in the constellation Ophiuchus

Eta Ophiuchi (Sabik)
- Location of η Ophiuchi (circled)

Observation data Epoch J2000 Equinox ICRS
- Constellation: Ophiuchus
- Right ascension: 17^{h} 10^{m} 22.68689^{s}
- Declination: −15° 43′ 29.6639″
- Apparent magnitude (V): 2.43 (3.05/3.27)

Characteristics
- Evolutionary stage: main sequence
- Spectral type: A2V + A2V
- U−B color index: +0.09
- B−V color index: +0.05

Astrometry
Radial velocity (R_{v})	−0.9 km/s
Proper motion (μ)	RA: +40.13 mas/yr Dec.: +99.17 mas/yr
Parallax (π)	36.91±0.80 mas
Distance	88 ± 2 ly (27.1 ± 0.6 pc)

Orbit
Period (P)	87.77+0.28 −0.24 yr
Semi-major axis (a)	31.05+1.41 −1.35 au
Eccentricity (e)	0.93077+0.00013 −0.00012
Inclination (i)	96.305+0.019 −0.018°
Longitude of the node (Ω)	39.241±0.011°
Periastron epoch (T)	2024.526
Argument of periastron (ω) (secondary)	275.90+0.10 −0.11°

Details

η Oph A (Sabik)
Mass	2.25+0.18 −0.09 M_{☉}
Radius	2.5±0.4 R_{☉}
Luminosity	35 L_{☉}
Surface gravity (log g)	3.74 cgs
Temperature	9,000+1,250 −750 K
Metallicity	−0.01 dex
Rotational velocity (v sin i)	23 km/s
Age	500+210 −280 Myr

η Oph B
Mass	2.03±0.02 M_{☉}
Radius	2.0+0.3 −0.2 R_{☉}
Luminosity	21 L_{☉}
Temperature	8,700±450 K
Age	500+210 −280 Myr

Other designations
- Sabik, 35 Oph, BD−15°4467, GCTP 3895.00, Gl 656.1A/B, HD 155125, HIP 84012, HR 6378, SAO 160332, WDS J17104-1544AB

Database references
SIMBAD	data

Eta Ophiuchi is a binary star in the constellation of Ophiuchus. Its name is a Bayer designation that is Latinized from η Ophiuchi, and abbreviated Eta Oph or η Oph. With a combined apparent magnitude of +2.43, it is the second-brightest of the constellation and one of the brightest stars in the night sky. Based on parallax measurements taken during the Hipparcos mission, it is approximately 88 light-years away.

The components of this system are designated Eta Ophiuchi A (also called Sabik /ˈseɪbɪk/), and Eta Ophiuchi B.

== Nomenclature ==
η Ophiuchi (Latinised to Eta Ophiuchi) is the system's Bayer designation. WDS J17104-1544AB is its designation in the Washington Double Star Catalog. The designations of the two components as WDS J17104-1544 A and B derive from the convention used by the Washington Multiplicity Catalog (WMC) for multiple star systems, and adopted by the International Astronomical Union (IAU).

It bore the traditional name Sabik, from the Arabic السابق al-sābiq "the preceding one", of uncertain reference. In 2016, the International Astronomical Union organized a Working Group on Star Names (WGSN) to catalogue and standardize proper names for stars. The WGSN approved the name Sabik for the component WDS J17104-1544 A on 21 August 2016 and it is now so included in the List of IAU-approved Star Names.

In Chinese, this star is considered part of 天市左垣 (Tiān Shì Zuǒ Yuán), meaning Left Wall of Heavenly Market Enclosure, which refers to an asterism representing eleven old states in China that mark the left borderline of the enclosure, consisting of Eta Ophiuchi, Delta Herculis, Lambda Herculis, Mu Herculis, Omicron Herculis, 112 Herculis, Zeta Aquilae, Theta Serpentis, Eta Serpentis, Nu Ophiuchi and Xi Serpentis. Consequently, the Chinese name for Eta Ophiuchi itself is 天市左垣十一 (Tiān Shì Zuǒ Yuán shíyī, English: the Eleventh Star of Left Wall of Heavenly Market Enclosure), representing the state Song (宋).

=== Namesake ===
USS Sabik (AK-121) was a United States Navy Crater class cargo ship named after the star.

== Properties ==
Eta Ophiuchi consists of two A-type main-sequence stars, currently fusing hydrogen into helium at their core. The primary, of apparent magnitude +3.05, has about 2.5 times the Sun's radius and 2.25 times its mass, with an effective temperature around 9,000 K. The secondary, of apparent magnitude +3.27, is 2 times as large and massive than the Sun, with an effective temperature of 8,700 K. The estimated age of the system is 500 million years, albeit with significant uncertainty.

The stars take 87.8 years to complete an orbit, which is highly elliptical: While the semi-major axis is 31 astronomical units, the high orbital eccentricity of 0.931 take them to a distance of 2.15 au during their closest approach (the periastron); the last of such occurring in 2024. Such large eccentricity hindered accurate measurements of the stellar mass with the Kepler's third law, until observations with the Very Large Telescope during the most recent periastron accurately determined orbital elements such as the eccentricity, hence a considerable mass sum for A2V-type stars.
