= Theta Serpentis =

Binary star in constellation of Serpens

θ Serpentis
- Location of θ Serpentis (circled in red)

Observation data Epoch J2000.0 Equinox ICRS
- Constellation: Serpens
- θ^{1} Ser
- Right ascension: 18^{h} 56^{m} 13.18720^{s}
- Declination: +04° 12′ 12.9821″
- Apparent magnitude (V): +4.62
- θ^{2} Ser
- Right ascension: 18^{h} 56^{m} 14.64102^{s}
- Declination: +04° 12′ 07.6594″
- Apparent magnitude (V): +4.98

Characteristics

θ^{1} Ser
- Spectral type: A5V

θ^{2} Ser
- Evolutionary stage: main sequence
- Spectral type: A5Vn

Astrometry

θ^{1} Ser
Proper motion (μ)	RA: +46.374 mas/yr Dec.: +31.313 mas/yr
Parallax (π)	24.2696±0.1753 mas
Distance	134.4 ± 1.0 ly (41.2 ± 0.3 pc)

θ^{2} Ser
Proper motion (μ)	RA: +50.044 mas/yr Dec.: +28.363 mas/yr
Parallax (π)	24.5310±0.1083 mas
Distance	133.0 ± 0.6 ly (40.8 ± 0.2 pc)

Position (relative to A)
Component	B
Epoch of observation	2019
Angular distance	22.40″
Position angle	106°
Projected separation	900 AU

Details

θ^{1} Ser
Mass	1.94±0.30 M_{☉}
Radius	2.21±0.07 R_{☉}
Luminosity	24 L_{☉}
Surface gravity (log g)	4.04±0.07 cgs
Temperature	8,019±136 K
Rotational velocity (v sin i)	130 km/s
Age	594 Myr

θ^{2} Ser
Mass	1.768±0.040 M_{☉}
Radius	2.094±0.044 R_{☉}
Luminosity	13.32+0.15 −0.17 L_{☉}
Surface gravity (log g)	3.99 cgs
Temperature	7,631+11 −10 K
Rotational velocity (v sin i)	220 km/s
Age	390 Myr

Other designations
- 63 Serpentis, ADS 11853, CCDM 18563+0413, WDS 18562+0412
- θ^{1} Ser: Alya, θ Ser A, HR 7141, HD 175638, SAO 124068, HIP 92946, WDS 18562+0412A
- θ^{2} Ser: θ Ser B, HR 7142, HD 175639, SAO 124070, HIP 92951, WDS 18562+0412B

Database references
SIMBAD	θ Ser
- θ^{1} Ser
- θ^{2} Ser

Theta Serpentis (θ Serpentis, abbreviated Theta Ser, θ Ser) is a binary star in the constellation of Serpens. It is visible to the naked eye with a combined apparent magnitude of 4.0. Based on parallax measurements, it lies about 130 light-years distant.

The two components are designated Theta Serpentis A (officially named Alya /ˈæliə/, the traditional name for the entire system), also called Theta^{1} Serpentis, and B, also called Theta^{2} Serpentis.

== Nomenclature ==
θ Serpentis (Latinised to Theta Serpentis) is the system's Bayer designation; θ^{1} and θ^{2} Serpentis those of the brightest two components. The designations of the two constituents as Theta Serpentis AB and C, and those of AB's components - Theta Serpentis A and B - derive from the convention used by the Washington Multiplicity Catalog (WMC) for multiple star systems, and adopted by the International Astronomical Union (IAU).

The system bore the traditional name Alya, or Alga, from the Arabic الية ’alyah "fat tail (of a sheep)". In 2016, the IAU organized a Working Group on Star Names (WGSN) to catalogue and standardize proper names for stars. The WGSN decided to attribute proper names to individual stars rather than entire multiple systems. It approved the name Alya for the component Theta Serpentis A on 21 August 2016 and it is now so included in the List of IAU-approved Star Names.

In the catalogue of stars in the Calendarium of Al Achsasi al Mouakket, this star was designated Dzaneb al Haiyet, which was translated into Latin as Cauda Serpentis, meaning 'the serpent's tail'.

In Chinese, 天市左垣 (Tiān Shì Zuǒ Yuán), meaning Left Wall of Heavenly Market Enclosure, refers to an asterism which represents eleven old states in China, consisting of Theta Serpentis, Delta Herculis, Lambda Herculis, Mu Herculis, Omicron Herculis, 112 Herculis, Zeta Aquilae, Eta Serpentis, Nu Ophiuchi, Xi Serpentis and Eta Ophiuchi. Consequently, the Chinese name for Theta Serpentis itself is 天市左垣七 (Tiān Shì Zuǒ Yuán qī, English: the Seventh Star of Left Wall of Heavenly Market Enclosure), representing the state Xu (徐).

== Properties ==
Both Theta^{1} Serpentis and Theta^{2} Serpentis are A-type main sequence stars. As of 2019, these two stars are 22 arcseconds apart on the sky along a position angle of 106°, values that changed little since the first observations in 1755. At the system's distance, the angular separation give a projected separation of 900 astronomical units, implying an orbital period in the order of 10,000 years. θ^{1} has an apparent magnitude of +4.62 while the slightly dimmer θ^{2} has a magnitude of +4.98. Both stars are similar to each other in all respects, having luminosities of 24 and 13 times solar, masses of 2.0 and 1.8 solar masses, radii of about twice solar and effective temperatures of 8,000 and 7,600 K, respectively.

The magnitude 6.71 star HD 175726 (Theta Serpentis C) is an optical companion to the pair. As of 2007, it is separated by 421" from A and 405" from B. It is not gravitationally bound to the pair since its distance to Earth is 87 light-years, much closer than the AB pair. Its proper motion is also discrepant with that of Theta Serpentis. It is a G-type main-sequence star with about the same mass and radius as the Sun.
