= Xi Serpentis =

Triple star system in the constellation Serpens

ξ Serpentis
- Location of ξ Serpentis (circled)

Observation data Epoch J2000.0 Equinox J2000.0 (ICRS)
- Constellation: Serpens
- Right ascension: 17^{h} 37^{m} 35.19983^{s}
- Declination: −15° 23′ 54.7940″
- Apparent magnitude (V): 3.54

Characteristics
- Spectral type: A9 IIIp Sr
- U−B color index: +0.12
- B−V color index: +0.27

Astrometry
Radial velocity (R_{v})	−42.8±0.7 km/s
Proper motion (μ)	RA: −42.10 mas/yr Dec.: −59.94 mas/yr
Parallax (π)	30.98±0.19 mas
Distance	105.3 ± 0.6 ly (32.3 ± 0.2 pc)
Absolute magnitude (M_{V})	+1.00

Orbit
Period (P)	2.2923 d
Eccentricity (e)	0.00
Periastron epoch (T)	2419210.191 JD
Semi-amplitude (K_{1}) (primary)	19.4 km/s

Details

ξ Ser Aa
Mass	2.06 M_{☉}
Radius	3.695 R_{☉}
Luminosity	30.6 L_{☉}
Surface gravity (log g)	3.55 cgs
Temperature	7,217±41 K
Metallicity [Fe/H]	+0.07 dex
Rotational velocity (v sin i)	54 km/s
Age	1.03 Gyr

ξ Ser Ab
Mass	0.18 M_{☉}

Other designations
- ξ Ser, 55 Serpentis, BD−15°4621, FK5 658, HD 159876, HIP 86263, HR 6561, SAO 160700

Database references
SIMBAD	data

Xi Serpentis, Latinized from ξ Serpentis, is a triple star system in the Serpens Cauda (tail) section of the equatorial constellation Serpens. Based upon an annual parallax shift of 30.98 mas as seen from Earth, it is located 105.3 light years from the Sun. The star system is visible to the naked eye with a base apparent visual magnitude of +3.54. It is moving closer to the Sun and will make perihelion passage at a distance of 27 ly (8.2 pc) in around 690,000 years.

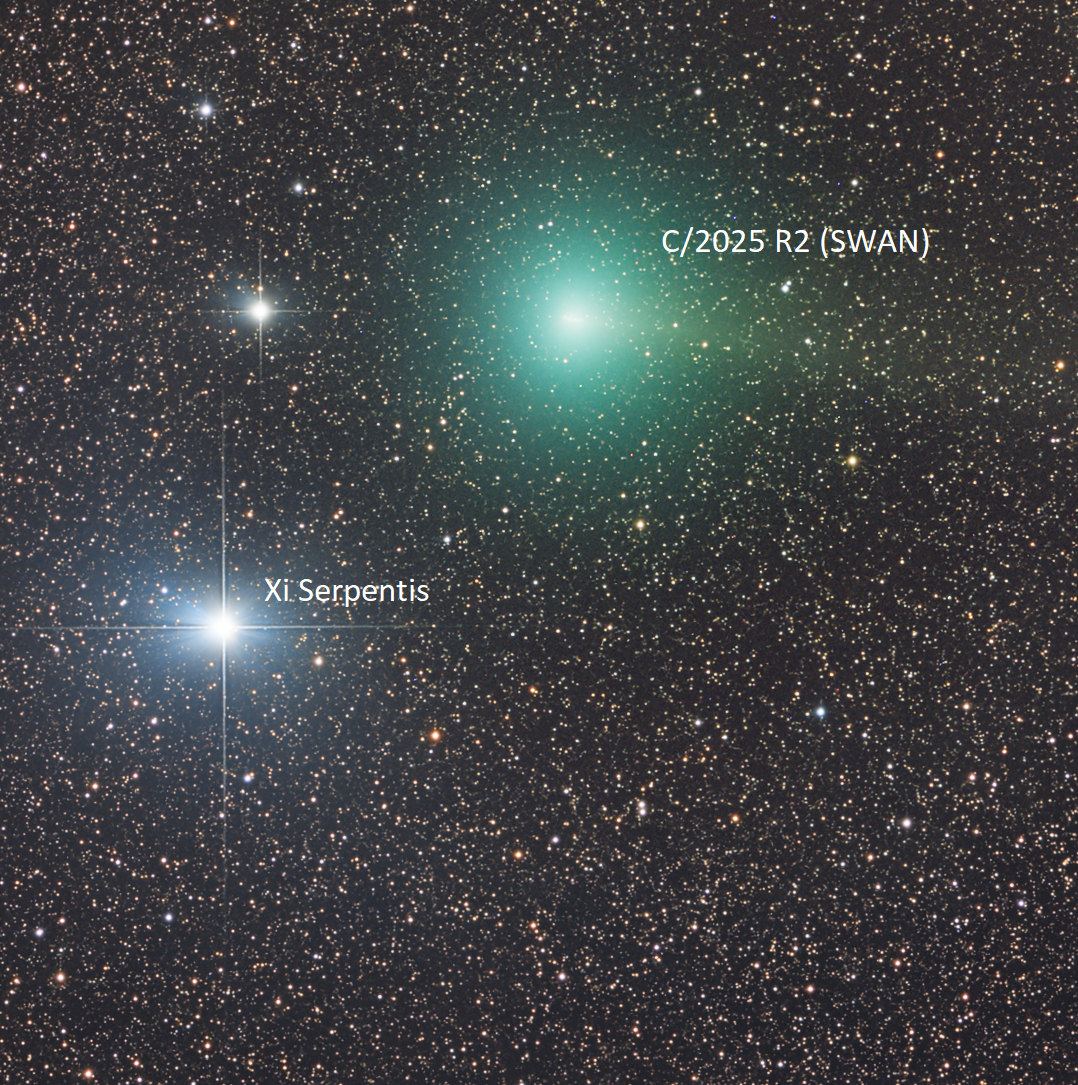
Xi Serpentis with a flyby of C/2025 R2 (SWAN) when it visited the inner solar system in October 2025

The inner pair form a single-lined spectroscopic binary with an orbital period of 2.29 days following a circular orbit. The primary, component Aa, has a visual magnitude of 3.54. It is a white-hued G-type giant star with a stellar classification of A9 IIIp Sr. This indicates it is a chemically peculiar Ap star with an abnormal abundance of strontium. The primary has around double the mass of the Sun, while its close companion, component Ab, has only 18% of the Sun's mass.

The third member, component B, is a magnitude 13.0 common proper motion companion. As of 2012, it was located at an angular separation of 24 arc seconds along a position angle of 78° from the inner pair. It has about 27% of the Sun's mass and an estimated orbital period of 14,763 years.

== Name ==
In Chinese, Tiān Shì Zuǒ Yuán (天市左垣), meaning Left Wall of Heavenly Market Enclosure, refers to an asterism which represents eleven old states (and region) in China and which marks the left borderline of the enclosure, consisting of ξ Serpentis, δ Herculis, λ Herculis, μ Herculis, ο Herculis, 112 Herculis, ζ Aquilae, η Serpentis, θ^{1} Serpentis, ν Ophiuchi and η Ophiuchi. Consequently, the Chinese name for ξ Serpentis itself is Tiān Shì Zuǒ Yuán shí (天市左垣十, English: the Tenth Star of Left Wall of Heavenly Market Enclosure), representing the region of Nanhai (南海, lit. meaning southern sea)
