= Mu Herculis =

Quadruple star system in the constellation Hercules

μ Herculis
- Location of μ Herculis (circled in red)

Observation data Epoch J2000 Equinox ICRS
- Constellation: Hercules
- μ Her Aab (μ^{1} Her)
- Right ascension: 17^{h} 46^{m} 27.52667^{s}
- Declination: +27° 43′ 14.4379″
- Apparent magnitude (V): 3.417 ± 0.014
- μ Her BC (μ^{2} Her)
- Right ascension: 17^{h} 46^{m} 25.079^{s}
- Declination: +27° 43′ 01.45″
- Apparent magnitude (V): 10.2 / 10.7

Characteristics

μ Her Aab
- Spectral type: G5IV / M4±1V
- U−B color index: +0.40
- B−V color index: +0.76

μ Her BC
- Spectral type: M3.5V
- U−B color index: +1.00
- B−V color index: +1.50

Astrometry

μ Her Aab
Radial velocity (R_{v})	−17.07 ± 0.12 km/s
Proper motion (μ)	RA: −291.66 mas/yr Dec.: −749.60 mas/yr
Parallax (π)	120.069±0.089 mas
Distance	27.16 ± 0.02 ly (8.329 ± 0.006 pc)
Absolute magnitude (M_{V})	3.82 ± 0.02

μ Her BC
Proper motion (μ)	RA: −343.35 mas/yr Dec.: −743.88 mas/yr
Absolute magnitude (M_{V})	+10.26

Orbit
Primary	μ Her A
Name	μ Her BC
Period (P)	12905.46+421.70 −608.68 yr
Semi-major axis (a)	1132+25 −33 AU
Eccentricity (e)	0.879±0.004
Inclination (i)	79.58±0.21°
Longitude of the node (Ω)	238.05±0.34°
Periastron epoch (T)	4690500.10+77254.66 −110823.59
Argument of periastron (ω) (secondary)	290.6±0.8°

Orbit
Primary	μ Her Aa
Name	μ Her Ab
Period (P)	78.987±0.288 yr
Semi-major axis (a)	20.418±0.050 AU
Eccentricity (e)	0.379±0.001
Inclination (i)	62.39±0.07°
Longitude of the node (Ω)	267.50±0.06°
Periastron epoch (T)	2460156.6±7.3
Argument of periastron (ω) (secondary)	50.303±0.224°

Orbit
Primary	μ Her B
Name	μ Her C
Period (P)	43.141±0.008 yr
Semi-major axis (a)	11.705±0.031 AU
Eccentricity (e)	0.179±0.001
Inclination (i)	66.10±0.09°
Longitude of the node (Ω)	60.48±0.14°
Periastron epoch (T)	2454637.0±20.8
Argument of periastron (ω) (secondary)	173.430±0.510°

Details

μ Her Aa
Mass	1.134±0.007 M_{☉}
Radius	1.709+0.030 −0.015 R_{☉}
Luminosity	2.557±0.026 L_{☉}
Surface gravity (log g)	4.020±0.025 cgs
Temperature	5,596±22 K
Metallicity [Fe/H]	+0.26±0.04 dex
Rotation	52+3 −1 d
Rotational velocity (v sin i)	1.7 ± 0.4 km/s
Age	8.4+0.4 −0.1 Gyr

μ Her Ab
Mass	0.2286±0.0006 M_{☉}

μ Her B
Mass	0.417±0.005 M_{☉}
Radius	0.378±0.026 R_{☉}
Luminosity	0.087 L_{☉}
Temperature	3,100±32 K
Metallicity [Fe/H]	+0.40 dex

μ Her C
Mass	0.445±0.005 M_{☉}
Radius	0.378±0.026 R_{☉}
Temperature	3,100±32 K
Metallicity	+0.40

Other designations
- 86 Herculis, Gl 695, HR 6623, BD+27°2888, HD 161797, LHS 3326/3325, LTT 15266, SAO 85397, FK5 667, LFT 1374, GC 24138, ADS 10786, HIP 86974.

Database references
SIMBAD	μ Her Aab
- μ Her BC

Mu Herculis (μ Herculis) is a nearby quadruple star system about 27.1 light years (8.3 parsecs) from Earth in the constellation Hercules. Its main star, Mu Herculis A is fairly similar to the Sun although more highly evolved with a stellar classification of G5 IV. Since 1943, the spectrum of this star has served as one of the stable anchor points by which other stars are classified. Its mass is about 1.1 times that of the Sun, and it is beginning to expand to become a giant.

== Etymology ==
In the catalogue of stars in the Calendarium of Al Achsasi Al Mouakket, this star was designated Marfak Al Jathih Al Aisr, which was translated into Latin as Cubitum Sinistrum Ingeniculi, meaning the left elbow of kneeling man.

In Chinese, 天市左垣 (Tiān Shì Zuǒ Yuán), the Left Wall of Heavenly Market Enclosure, refers to an asterism which represents eleven old states in China, marking the left borderline of the enclosure, consisting of μ Herculis, δ Herculis, λ Herculis, ο Herculis, 112 Herculis, ζ Aquilae, θ^{1} Serpentis, η Serpentis, ν Ophiuchi, ξ Serpentis and η Ophiuchi. Consequently, the Chinese name for μ Herculis itself is 天市左垣三 (Tiān Shì Zuǒ Yuán sān, English: the Third Star of Left Wall of Heavenly Market Enclosure), represent Jiuhe (九河, lit. meaning nine rivers), possibly for Jiujiang, the prefecture-level city in Jiangxi, China, which is the same literally meaning with Jiuhe. From this Chinese title, the name Kew Ho appeared.

== Star system ==
Mu Herculis is a quadruple star system. The brightest star is a well-studied G-type subgiant, whose parameters are precisely determined from asteroseismology. It was believed to be a close binary with a low-mass stellar or a large substellar companion. This was confirmed when a low-mass companion was resolved using near-infrared spectroscopy. The companion star is a red dwarf with a spectral type of M4±1V and a mass of 0.228 M_{☉}. This pair is also known as Mu^{1} Herculis.

The secondary component, also known as Mu^{2} Herculis, consists of a pair of stars that orbit about each other with a period of about 43 years. Mu Herculis A and the binary pair B-C are separated by some 35 arcseconds. The stars B and C, which orbit each other, are separated from each other by 1.385 arcseconds, and have a slightly eccentric orbit, at 0.179.

== See also ==
- List of star systems within 25–30 light-years
