= Delta Herculis =

Multiple star system in the constellation Hercules

δ Herculis
- Location of δ Herculis (circled)

Observation data Epoch J2000 Equinox ICRS
- Constellation: Hercules
- Right ascension: 17^{h} 15^{m} 01.9106^{s}
- Declination: +24° 50′ 21.135″
- Apparent magnitude (V): 3.126

Characteristics
- Evolutionary stage: main sequence
- Spectral type: A3IV
- U−B color index: +0.7
- B−V color index: +0.08

Astrometry
Radial velocity (R_{v})	−40.0 km/s
Proper motion (μ)	RA: −21.14 mas/yr Dec.: −157.68 mas/yr
Parallax (π)	43.41±0.15 mas
Distance	75.1 ± 0.3 ly (23.04 ± 0.08 pc)
Absolute magnitude (M_{V})	+1.31

Details

Aa
Mass	2.4 M_{☉}
Radius	2.2 R_{☉}
Luminosity	38 L_{☉}
Surface gravity (log g)	4.11 cgs
Temperature	9,620±350 K
Rotational velocity (v sin i)	270 km/s
Age	370 Myr

Ab
Mass	1.6 M_{☉}
Radius	1.5 R_{☉}
Luminosity	6.8 L_{☉}
Temperature	7,500 K

Other designations
- Sarin, δ Her, 65 Her, BD+25°3221, CCDM J17151+2451A, FK5 641, GC 23294, HD 156164, HIP 84379, HR 6410, SAO 84951

Database references
SIMBAD	data

Delta Herculis (δ Herculis, abbreviated Delta Her, δ Her) is a spectroscopic binary in the constellation of Hercules. Its light produces to us apparent magnitude 3.12, as such the third-brightest star in the large, fairly dim constellation. Based on parallax measurement taken during the Hipparcos mission, it is approximately 23.1 parsecs (75 light-years) from the Sun.

== Companions ==
Delta Herculis consists of a binary pair, designated Delta Herculis A, together with three optical companions, suffixed B, C and D. The angular separation between the main component A and the component B, which has a magnitude of 8.74, is 8.5 arcseconds .

A's components are designated Delta Herculis Aa (officially named Sarin /ˈsɛərɪn/, the traditional name of the system) and Ab.

== Nomenclature ==
δ Herculis (Latinised to Delta Herculis) is the system's Bayer designation. The designations of the four constituents as Delta Herculis A, B, C and D, and those of A's components - Delta Herculis Aa and Ab - derive from the convention used by the Washington Multiplicity Catalog (WMC) for multiple star systems, and adopted by the International Astronomical Union (IAU).

It bore the name Sarin in the 20th-century Skalnate Pleso Atlas of the Heavens. In 2016, the International Astronomical Union organized a Working Group on Star Names (WGSN) to catalogue and standardize proper names for stars. The WGSN decided to attribute proper names to individual stars rather than entire multiple systems. It approved the name Sarin for the component Delta Herculis Aa on 12 September 2016 and it is now so included in the List of IAU-approved Star Names.

In the catalogue of stars in the Calendarium of Al Achsasi al Mouakket, this star was designated Menkib al Jathi al Aisr, which was translated into Latin as Humerus Sinister Ingeniculi, meaning kneeler's left shoulder.

In Chinese, 天市左垣 (Tiān Shì Zuǒ Yuán), meaning Left Wall of Heavenly Market Enclosure, refers to an asterism which represents eleven old states in China which is marking the left borderline of the enclosure, consisting of Delta Herculis, Lambda Herculis, Mu Herculis, Omicron Herculis, 112 Herculis, Zeta Aquilae, Theta^{1} Serpentis, Eta Serpentis, Nu Ophiuchi, Xi Serpentis and Eta Ophiuchi. Consequently, the Chinese name for Delta Herculis itself is 天市左垣一 (Tiān Shì Zuǒ Yuán yī, English: the First Star of Left Wall of Heavenly Market Enclosure), and represents the state of Wei (魏), together with 33 Capricorni, according to Ian Ridpath version or Phi Capricorni and Chi Capricorni in R.H. Allen's version in Twelve States (asterism).

== Properties ==
Delta Herculis A presents as an A-type subgiant with a stellar classification of A3IV. It has both a mass and radius that are roughly two times solar yielding a total luminosity of about 18.5 L_{☉} The secondary is about 1.3 magnitudes fainter.

== See also ==
- Lists of stars in the constellation Hercules
- Class A Stars
