= Lambda Herculis =

Star in the constellation Hercules

- Location of λ Herculis (circled in red)

Observation data Epoch J2000 Equinox ICRS
- Constellation: Hercules
- Right ascension: 17^{h} 30^{m} 44.3098^{s}
- Declination: +26° 06′ 38.324″
- Apparent magnitude (V): 4.41

Characteristics
- Evolutionary stage: red giant branch or red clump
- Spectral type: K3.5III
- U−B color index: +1.68
- B−V color index: +1.44

Astrometry
Radial velocity (R_{v})	−26.51 km/s
Proper motion (μ)	RA: +18.782 mas/yr Dec.: +16.184 mas/yr
Parallax (π)	8.2943±0.0921 mas
Distance	393 ± 4 ly (121 ± 1 pc)
Absolute magnitude (M_{V})	−0.86

Details
Mass	1.18 M_{☉}
Radius	40.28±0.48 R_{☉}
Luminosity	400 L_{☉}
Surface gravity (log g)	1.30 cgs
Temperature	4,063 - 4,079 K
Metallicity [Fe/H]	0.023 dex
Rotational velocity (v sin i)	<1.5 km/s
Age	3.98 or 7.23 Gyr

Other designations
- Maasym, λ Her, 76 Herculis, BD+26°3034, FK5 1460, HD 158899, HIP 85693, HR 6526, SAO 249461

Database references
SIMBAD	data

Lambda Herculis (λ Herculis. abbreviated Lambda Her, λ Her), formally named Maasym /ˈmeɪəsɪm/, is a star in the constellation of Hercules. From parallax measurements taken during the Gaia mission, it is approximately 393 light-years from the Sun.

== Nomenclature ==
λ Herculis (Latinised to Lambda Herculis) is the star's Bayer designation.

It bore the traditional name Maasym, from the Arabic مِعْصَم miʽṣam "wrist". In 2016, the International Astronomical Union organized a Working Group on Star Names (WGSN) to catalogue and standardize proper names for stars. The WGSN approved the name Maasym for this star on 12 September 2016 and it is now so included in the List of IAU-approved Star Names.

In Chinese, 天市左垣 (Tiān Shì Zuǒ Yuán), meaning Left Wall of Heavenly Market Enclosure, refers to an asterism which represents eleven old states in China and which is marking the left borderline of the enclosure, consisting of Lambda Herculis, Delta Herculis, Mu Herculis, Omicron Herculis, 112 Herculis, Zeta Aquilae, Theta^{1} Serpentis, Eta Serpentis, Nu Ophiuchi, Xi Serpentis and Eta Ophiuchi. Consequently, the Chinese name for Lambda Herculis itself is 天市左垣二 (Tiān Shì Zuǒ Yuán èr, English: the Second Star of Left Wall of Heavenly Market Enclosure), and represents the state Zhao (or Chaou (趙)), together with 26 Capricorni and 27 Capricorni ("m Capricorni" in R.H.Allen version) in Twelve States (asterism).

== Description ==
Lambda Herculis has an apparent magnitude of 4.4. It has been listed as a standard star for the spectral class spectral class K3.5III, indicating that it is a red giant with a temperature of about 4,000 K. Visually it has an absolute magnitude of −0.86, meaning it is nearly 200 times brighter than the sun, but its bolometric luminosity across all wavelengths is over 400 L_{☉}. It is unclear whether the star is on the red giant branch and fusing hydrogen in a shell or on the horizontal branch (red clump) and fusing helium in its core. As a horizontal-branch star it would be about seven billion years old, but as a red-giant-branch star it would only be about four billion years old.

In 1783, English-German astronomer William Herschel described the solar apex, the point in sky towards which the Solar System is moving; using data from double stars, he identified this position as close to Lambda Herculis. Today it is known the solar apex is not so close to this star, however it is only 10° away from the position currently accepted (in Hercules, southwest of Vega).
