= Eta Serpentis =

Star in the constellation Serpens

- Location of η Serpentis (circled)

Observation data Epoch J2000 Equinox J2000
- Constellation: Serpens
- Right ascension: 18^{h} 21^{m} 18.60056^{s}
- Declination: −02° 53′ 55.7766″
- Apparent magnitude (V): 3.260

Characteristics
- Spectral type: K0 III-IV
- U−B color index: +0.643
- B−V color index: +0.940

Astrometry
Radial velocity (R_{v})	+8.4 km/s
Proper motion (μ)	RA: −547.75 mas/yr Dec.: −701.42 mas/yr
Parallax (π)	53.93±0.18 mas
Distance	60.5 ± 0.2 ly (18.54 ± 0.06 pc)
Absolute magnitude (M_{V})	+1.87

Details
Mass	1.60±0.20 M_{☉}
Radius	5.92±0.02 R_{☉}
Luminosity	17.85±0.13 L_{☉}
Surface gravity (log g)	2.92±0.04 cgs
Temperature	4,875±7 K
Metallicity [Fe/H]	−0.21±0.01 dex
Rotational velocity (v sin i)	2.47±1.00 km/s
Age	2.69 Gyr

Other designations
- η Ser, 58 Ser, BD−02°4599, GJ 711, HD 168723, HIP 89962, HR 6869, SAO 142241

Database references
SIMBAD	data

Eta Serpentis, Latinized from η Serpentis, is a star in the constellation Serpens. In particular, it lies in Serpens Cauda, the snake's tail, and is the brightest in that part of the constellation. The star has an apparent visual magnitude of 3.260, making it visible to the naked eye. Parallax measurements give a distance estimate of 60.5 light-years (18.5 parsecs) from the Earth.

This star is larger than the Sun, with 1.6 times the mass and almost six times the radius. The spectrum matches a stellar classification of K0 III-IV, with the luminosity class of III-IV corresponding to an evolved star that lies between the subgiant and giant stages. The expanded outer envelope star is radiating about 18 times the luminosity of the Sun at an effective temperature of 4,875 K. At this temperature, it has an orange hue typical of a K-type star. Eta Serpentis displays solar-like oscillations with a period of 0.09 of a day.

Eta Serpentis was previously classified as a carbon star, which would have made it the brightest carbon star in the sky, although this classification was since found to be erroneous.

Eta Serpentis is currently 1.6 light-years away from Gliese 710.

== Name ==
In Chinese astronomy, the star is known as 天市左垣 (Tiān Shì Zuǒ Yuán), meaning 'Left Wall of Heavenly Market Enclosure'; the name refers to an asterism that represents eleven old states in China. The leftmost borderline of the enclosure consists of η Serpentis, δ Herculis, λ Herculis, μ Herculis, o Herculis, 112 Herculis, η Ophiuchi, ζ Aquilae, θ^{1} Serpentis, ν Ophiuchi and ξ Serpentis. Consequently, the Chinese name for η Serpentis itself is 天市左垣八 (Tiān Shì Zuǒ Yuán bā, the Eighth Star of Left Wall of Heavenly Market Enclosure, representing the region of Donghai (東海, lit. meaning 'eastern sea').
