= USS Sabik =

Cargo ship of the United States Navy

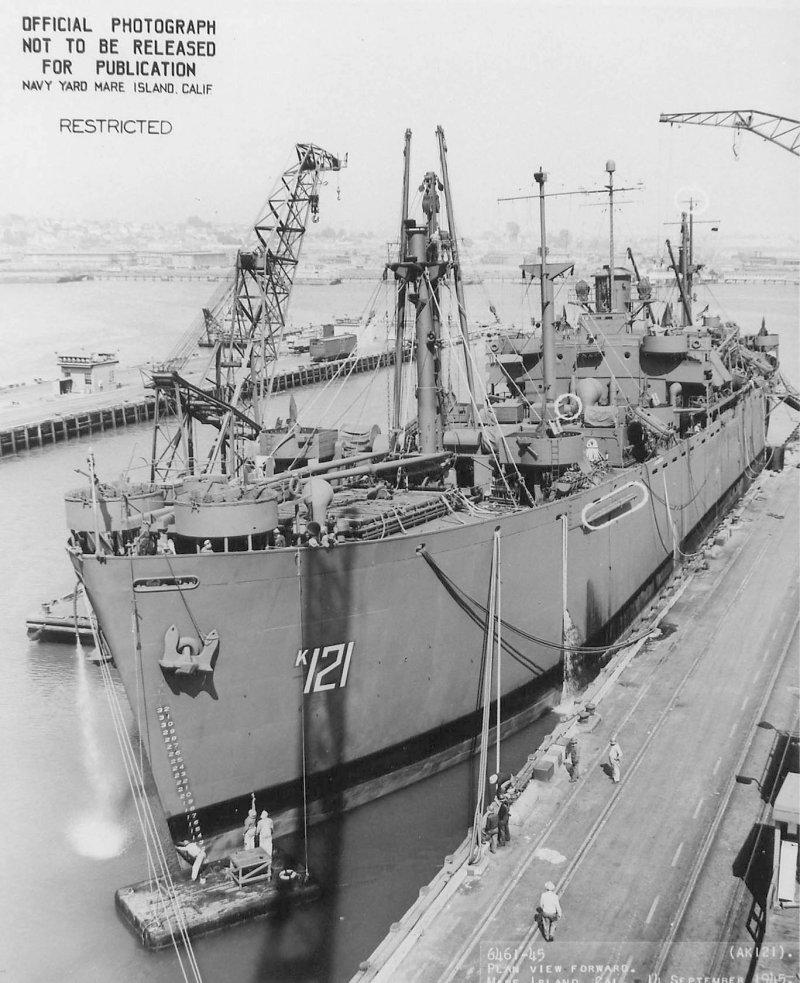
- Forward plan view of USS Sabik (AK-121) at Navy Yard Mare Island, Vallejo, CA., 14 September 1945. Sabik was at the yard from 24 August to 21 September 1945.

History

United States
- Name: William Becknell; Sabik
- Namesake: William Becknell; The star system Sabik
- Ordered: as a type (EC2-S-C1) hull, MCE hull 2423, SS William Becknell
- Builder: Todd Houston Shipbuilding Co., Houston, Texas
- Laid down: 8 November 1943
- Launched: 17 December 1943
- Sponsored by: Mrs. Johnnie L. Armstrong
- Acquired: 29 December 1943
- Commissioned: 19 April 1944
- Decommissioned: 31 January 1944
- In service: 19 April 1944
- Out of service: 19 March 1946
- Refit: converted for Naval service at Todd-Johnson Dry Docks, Inc, New Orleans, LA., 31 January 1944
- Stricken: 17 April 1946
- Identification: Hull symbol:AK-121
- Fate: Sold for scrapping, 19 October 1961

General characteristics
- Class & type: Crater-class cargo ship
- Displacement: 4,023 long tons (4,088 t) (standard); 14,550 long tons (14,780 t) (full load)
- Length: 441 ft 6 in (134.57 m)
- Beam: 56 ft 11 in (17.35 m)
- Draft: 28 ft 4 in (8.64 m)
- Installed power: 2 × Combustion Engineering header-type boilers, 220psi 450°; 2,500 shp (1,900 kW)
- Propulsion: 1 × Iron Fireman triple-expansion reciprocating steam engine; 1 × shaft
- Speed: 12.5 kn (23.2 km/h; 14.4 mph)
- Complement: 206
- Armament: 1 × 5 in (130 mm)/38-caliber dual-purpose gun; 4 × 40 mm (1.6 in) 40 mm Bofors anti-aircraft gun mounts; 6 × 20 mm (0.79 in) Oerlikon cannons anti-aircraft gun mounts

USS Sabik (AK-121) was a Crater-class cargo ship commissioned by the U.S. Navy for service in World War II. She was responsible for delivering troops, goods and equipment to locations in the war zone.

== Ship built in Houston, Texas ==
Sabik was laid down as SS William Becknell (MCE hull 2423) on 8 November 1943 by the Todd-Houston Shipbuilding Corp., Houston, Texas; renamed Sabik on 13 November; launched on 17 December; sponsored by Mrs. Johnnie L. Armstrong; accepted by WSA for United States Navy use on 29 December and moved to New Orleans, Louisiana, to undergo conversion by Todd-Johnson Dry Docks, Inc.; and commissioned on 19 April 1944.

== World War II Pacific Theatre operations ==
Following shakedown off Norfolk, Virginia, Sabik proceeded to Bayonne, New Jersey, where she loaded cargo and marines and sailed on 5 June for the New Hebrides. She arrived at Espiritu Santo on 13 July and then continued on to the Russell Islands, commencing a schedule of inter-island shuttle runs that ranged the southwestern Pacific Ocean during the course of the war.

=== Island-hopping in the South Pacific ===
For nearly 15 months, the cargo ship plied the waters between Guadalcanal, Tulagi, Munda, the Russells, the New Hebrides, Bougainville, Peleliu, Angaur, Ulithi, Eniwetok, Manus, Hollandia, Guam, Saipan, and Tinian. She participated in landings, during this time, at the Tacloban and Dulag beaches on Leyte, and at the Hagushi beaches on Okinawa. She finally sailed for Pearl Harbor on 29 July 1945, arriving on 13 August. She then proceeded to San Francisco, California, passing under the Golden Gate Bridge on 22 August.

=== End-of-war activity ===
Following long needed repairs, Sabik departed the Mare Island Naval Shipyard on 24 September en route to Guam and Majuro for Operation Magic Carpet duty. Returning troops to the United States, she returned to San Francisco exactly three months later on 24 December and remained there to await inactivation.

== Post-war decommissioning ==
Sabik decommissioned on 19 March 1946 and was returned to WSA the same day for lay-up at Suisun Bay, California. Struck from the Navy List on 17 April 1946, the ship resumed her original name, SS William Becknell, and remained in the National Defense Reserve Fleet until sold for scrapping on 30 October 1961 to Union Minerals and Alloys Corporation, New York City, New York.

== Military awards and honors ==
Sabik earned two battle stars for World War II service:

- Leyte operation (Leyte landings, Tacloban and Dulag, October and November 1944)
- Okinawa Gunto operation (Assault and occupation of Okinawa Gunto, November 1944 to January 1945)

Her crew was eligible for the following medals:

- American Campaign Medal
- Asiatic-Pacific Campaign Medal (2)
- World War II Victory Medal
- Philippines Liberation Medal (1)
