= Local standard of rest =

Astronomical reference frame defined by motion of near-Sun stars around Galactic Centre

In astronomy, the local standard of rest (LSR) is a reference frame which follows the mean motion of material in the Milky Way in the neighborhood of the Sun (stars in radius 100 pc from the Sun), on average sharing the same velocity around the Milky Way as the Sun. The path of this material is not precisely circular. The Sun follows the solar circle (eccentricity e < 0.1) at a speed of about 255 km/s in a clockwise direction when viewed from the galactic north pole at a radius of ≈ 8.34 kpc about the center of the galaxy near Sgr A*, and has only a slight motion, towards the solar apex, relative to the LSR.

LSR could be understood by analogy to a group of cars traveling at similar speed on a highway i.e. at LSR. If a faster car passes by or they pass a slower car then the faster and slower cars could be considered at not traveling at LSR.

The LSR velocity is anywhere from 202–241 km/s. In 2014, very-long-baseline interferometry observations of maser emission in high-mass star-forming regions (HMSFR) placed tight constraints on combinations of kinematic parameters such as the circular orbit speed of the Sun (Θ_{0} + V_{☉} = 255.2 ± 5.1 km/s). There is significant correlation between the circular motion of the solar circle, the solar peculiar motion, and the predicted counterrotation of star-forming regions. Additionally, local estimates of the velocity of the LSR based on stars in the vicinity of the Sun may potentially yield different results than global estimates derived from motions relative to the Galactic Center.

== See also ==
- Comoving coordinates for an example of another convenient astronomical reference frame.
