= Solar apex =

Direction the Sun travels relative to local standard of rest

Solar apex
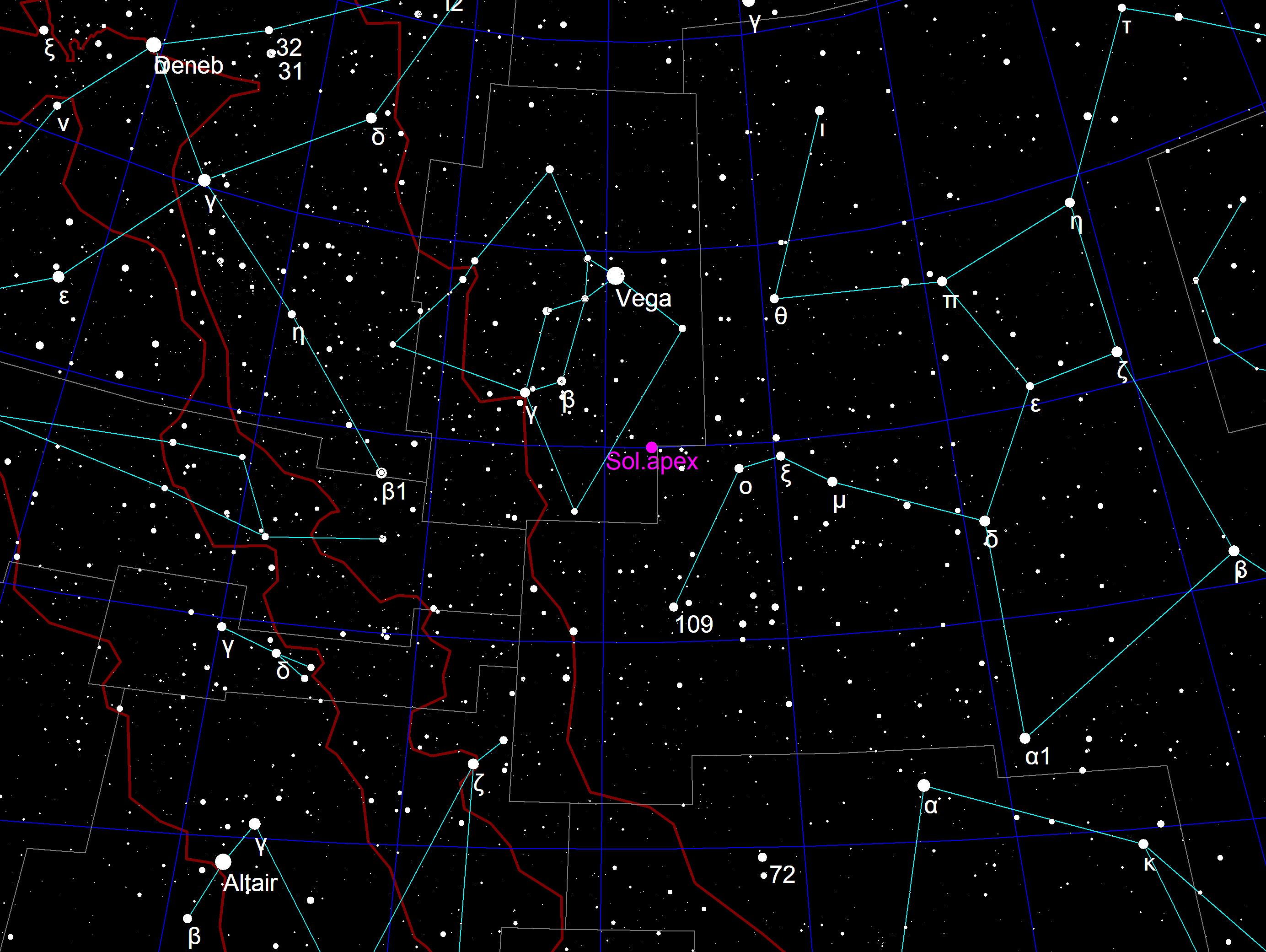
(RA) 18^{h} 28^{m} 0^{s} (dec) 30°N
Solar antapex
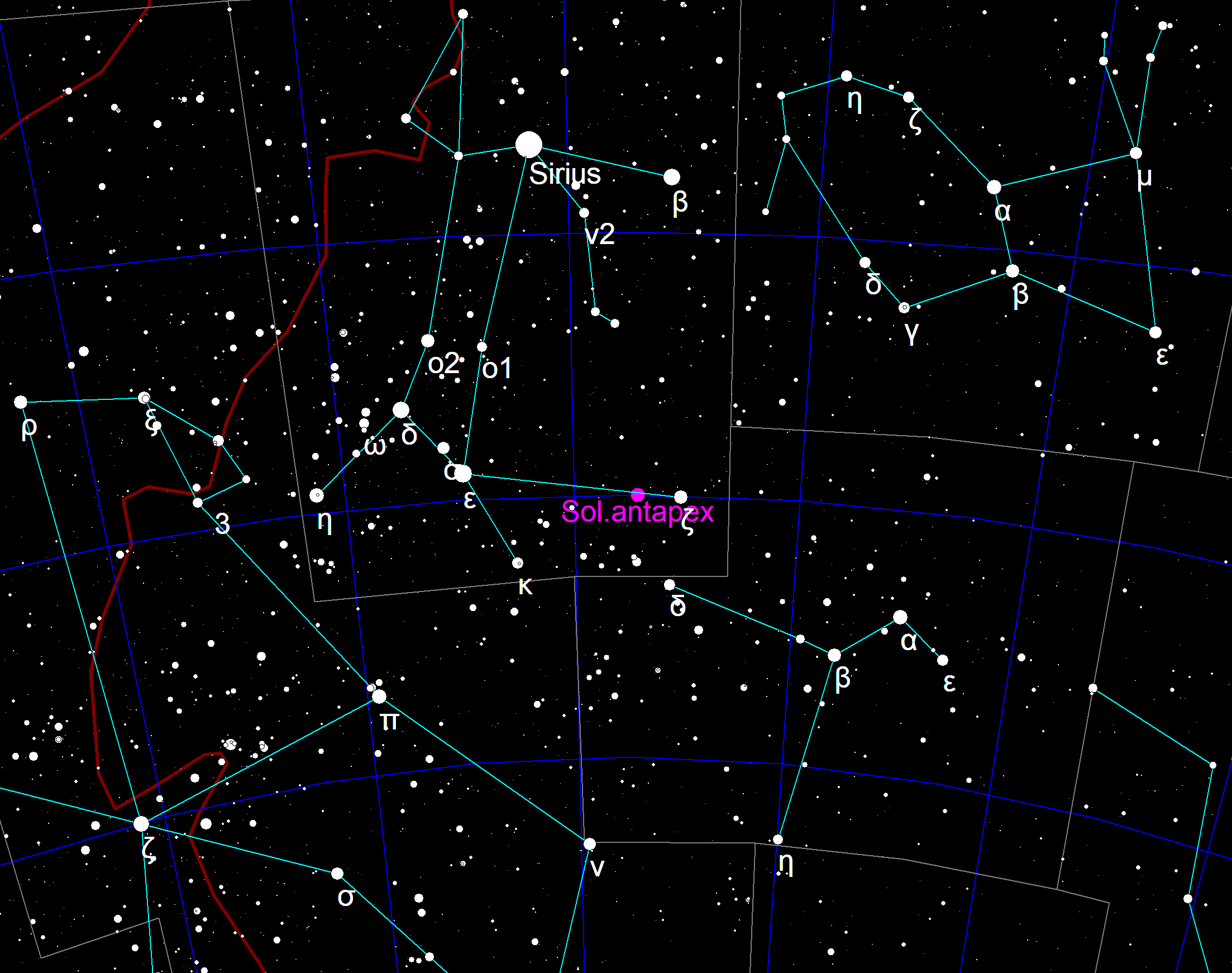
(RA) 6^{h} 28^{m} 0^{s} (dec) 30°S

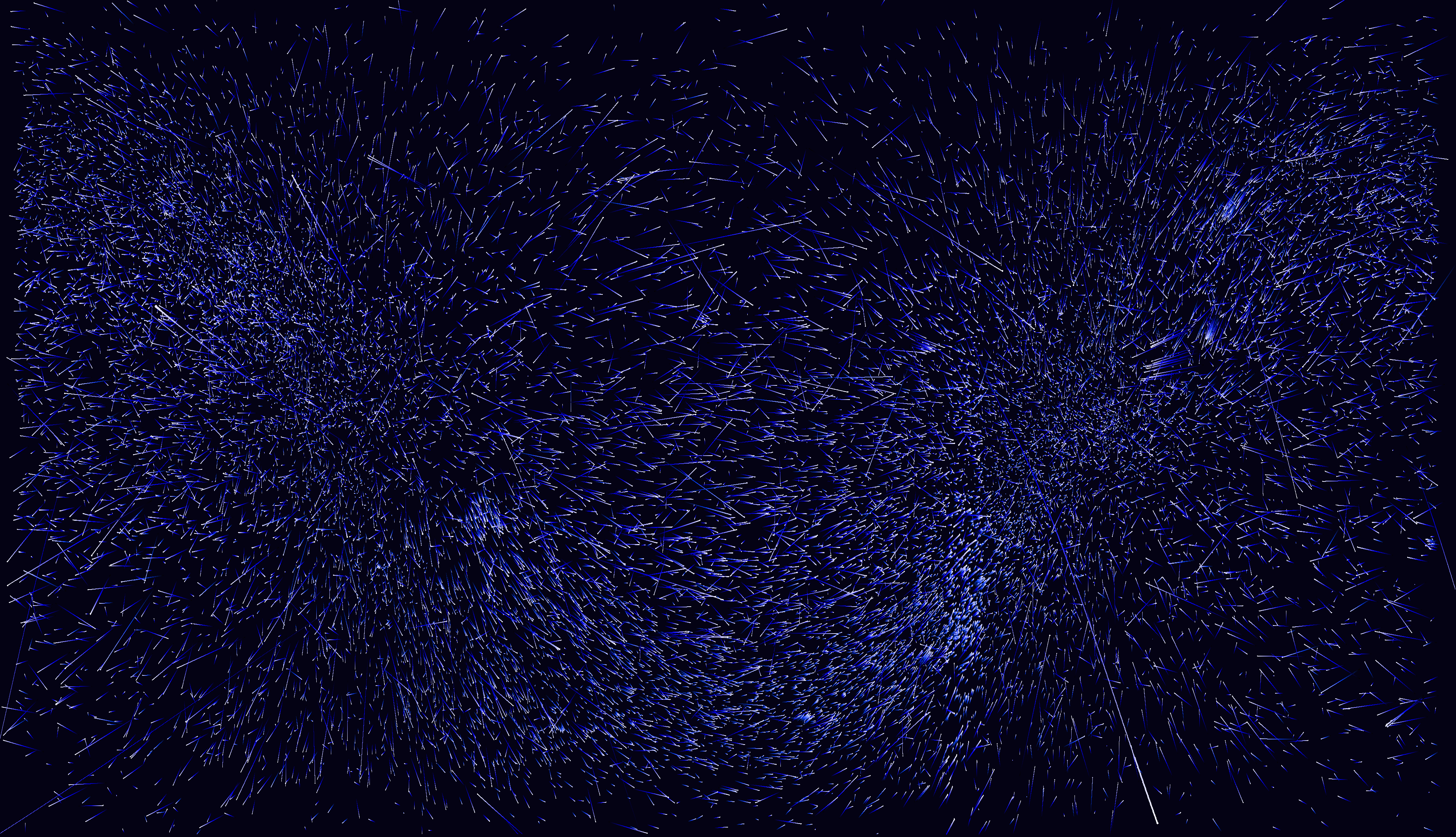
The movement of stars of spectral classes B and A around the apex (left) and antapex (right) in ± 200 000 years.

The solar apex, or the apex of the Sun's way, refers to the direction that the Sun travels with respect to the local standard of rest. This is not to be confused with the Sun's apparent motion through all constellations of the zodiac, which is an illusion caused by the Earth's orbit.

== Direction ==
The solar apex is in the constellation of Hercules near the star Vega.

For more than 30 years before 1986 the speed of the Sun towards the solar apex was taken to be about 20 km/s but all later studies give a smaller component in the vector toward galactic longitude 90°, reducing overall speed to about 13.4 km/s. This speed is not to be confused with the orbital speed of the Sun around the Galactic Center, which is about 220 km/s and is included in the movement of the Local standard of rest. Thus the Sun moves towards the apex (a relatively local point) at about 1/13 our spiral arm's orbital speed. The Sun's motion in the Milky Way is not confined to the galactic plane; it also shifts ("bobs") up and down with respect to the plane over millions of years.

== History ==
The nature and extent of the solar motion was first demonstrated by William Herschel in 1783, who also first determined the direction for the solar apex, as Lambda Herculis, 10° away from today's accepted position. Herschel was not an observer–he relied on star motions reported in existing catalogs by Nevil Maskelyne and Jérôme Lalande- and he was not an especially skilled mathematician but his result was close to modern values.

Many calculations of the solar apex have been published as new catalogues of stars were published. The catalog from the Hipparcos astrometric satellite and measurements with objective prisms lead to a new set of values. These two results do not agree. The calculation of the local standard of rest itself is subject to issues due to inhomogeneous stellar velocities and high sensitivity to parameters.

== Solar antapex ==
The solar antapex, the direction opposite of the solar apex, is located near the star Zeta Canis Majoris.

== Gallery ==
Animations of star motions around apex and antapex

The movement of stars around the apex (left) and antapex (right) in ± 500 000 years. To view this picture you need 3D glasses (red-green or red-blue).

The movement of stars around the apex. To view this picture you need 3D glasses (red-green or red-blue).

The movement of stars around the antapex. To view this picture you need 3D glasses (red-green or red-blue).

The movement of stars between apex and antapex. To view this picture you need 3D glasses (red-green or red-blue).

== See also ==
- Manuel Foster Observatory – southern observatory established for the determination of the Solar Apex by W. W. Campbell
