= Omicron Herculis =

Variable star in the constellation Hercules

ο Herculis
- Location of o Herculis (circled)

Observation data Epoch J2000 Equinox ICRS
- Constellation: Hercules
- Right ascension: 18^{h} 07^{m} 32.55073^{s}
- Declination: +28° 45′ 44.9679″
- Apparent magnitude (V): 3.83 to 3.85

Characteristics
- Spectral type: B9.5III
- U−B color index: −0.07
- B−V color index: −0.02
- Variable type: γ Cas

Astrometry
Radial velocity (R_{v})	−29.5 km/s
Proper motion (μ)	RA: −0.02 mas/yr Dec.: +8.55 mas/yr
Parallax (π)	9.65±0.16 mas
Distance	338 ± 6 ly (104 ± 2 pc)
Absolute magnitude (M_{V})	−1.24

Details
Mass	3.49±0.04 M_{☉}
Radius	6.3 R_{☉}
Luminosity	355 L_{☉}
Surface gravity (log g)	2.86 cgs
Temperature	9,484 K
Metallicity [Fe/H]	−0.06 dex
Rotational velocity (v sin i)	194 km/s

Other designations
- ο Her, 103 Herculis, BD+28 2925, FK5 681, HD 166014, HIP 88794, HR 6779, SAO 85750

Database references
SIMBAD	data

Omicron Herculis, Latinized from ο Herculis, is a star in the constellation Hercules.

== Nomenclature ==
This star used to be called Masym (from Arabic for "the wrist"), but this name was transferred to Lambda Herculis.

In Chinese astronomy, this is the fourth star of the asterism Tiān Shì Zuǒ Yuán (天市左垣, Left Wall of Heavenly Market Enclosure), representing the state Zhongshan (中山). In R. H. Allen's book Star Names this name, transliterated as Chung Shan with the meaning "the Middle Mountain", was instead attributed to ν Her, ξ Her, and 99 (b) Her.

== Properties ==
Omicron Herculis is a B9.5III star approximately 106 pc from the Earth. It has an apparent magnitude of 3.8. The star radiates with a bluish-white hue, and has a luminosity approximately 355 times as bright as the Sun. Omicron Herculis is 3.49 solar masses. Stellar evolutionary caclulations show that it has just left the main sequence.

Omicron Herculis is an eruptive variable of the Gamma Cassiopeiae class, which are rapidly rotating B-class stars with mass outflow. It has a projected rotational velocity of 194 km/s.

Some sources list Omicron Herculis as being both spectroscopic and an interferometric binary star with a separation of about 60 milliarcseconds, although the companion star has not been confirmed.

Omicron Hercules is notable for residing close to the coordinates of the solar apex, the direction towards which the Sun is moving. This was first noticed by William Herschel in 1783, although in his first calculation he identified this point with Lambda Herculis. It will eventually become the brightest star in the night sky in approximately 3.47 million years from today, at –0.63, slightly less bright than Canopus today.
