= 112 Herculis =

Binary star system in the constellation Hercules

- Location of 112 Herculis (circled)

Observation data Epoch J2000 Equinox J2000
- Constellation: Hercules
- Right ascension: 18^{h} 52^{m} 16.428^{s}
- Declination: +21° 25′ 30.51″
- Apparent magnitude (V): 5.43

Characteristics
- Spectral type: B9p Hg (B6.5V + A2V)
- B−V color index: −0.068±0.008

Astrometry
Radial velocity (R_{v})	−19.8±0.9 km/s
Proper motion (μ)	RA: −7.526 mas/yr Dec.: −10.231 mas/yr
Parallax (π)	7.8558±0.0728 mas
Distance	415 ± 4 ly (127 ± 1 pc)
Absolute magnitude (M_{V})	−0.04

Orbit
Period (P)	6.36246±0.00002 d
Eccentricity (e)	0.11±0.03
Periastron epoch (T)	2,452,540.11±0.03 JD
Argument of periastron (ω) (secondary)	198±2°
Semi-amplitude (K_{1}) (primary)	17.0±0.6 km/s
Semi-amplitude (K_{2}) (secondary)	35±2 km/s

Details

Primary
Mass	~5.0 M_{☉}
Radius	2.888 R_{☉}
Luminosity	203+4 −3 L_{☉}
Surface gravity (log g)	4.1 cgs
Temperature	12,853±89 K
Rotation	12.419 d
Rotational velocity (v sin i)	20 km/s

Secondary
Mass	~2.5 M_{☉}
Surface gravity (log g)	4.2 cgs

Other designations
- 112 Her, BD+21°3582, GC 25895, HD 174933, HIP 92614, HR 7113, SAO 86521, WDS J18523+2126

Database references
SIMBAD	data

112 Herculis is a binary star system in the northern constellation of Hercules. It is dimly visible to the naked eye with a combined apparent visual magnitude of 5.43. The secondary component is about two magnitudes fainter than the primary star. The distance to this system is approximately 415 light years based on parallax measurements. It is drifting closer to the Sun with a radial velocity of −20 km/s.

The binary character of this system was discovered by W. F. Meyer in 1926. By measuring the variation in velocity of the primary component, he determined an orbital period of 6.3624 days. K. Osawa in 1959 found a stellar classification of A4 III for the pair. W. P. Bidelman observed that the primary has unusually strong lines of ionized phosphorus, and it was assigned to the class of peculiar manganese stars by W. L. W. Sargent and L. Searle in 1962, with a resulting spectral type of B9. No evidence was found for a strong magnetic field by P. S. Conti in 1970.

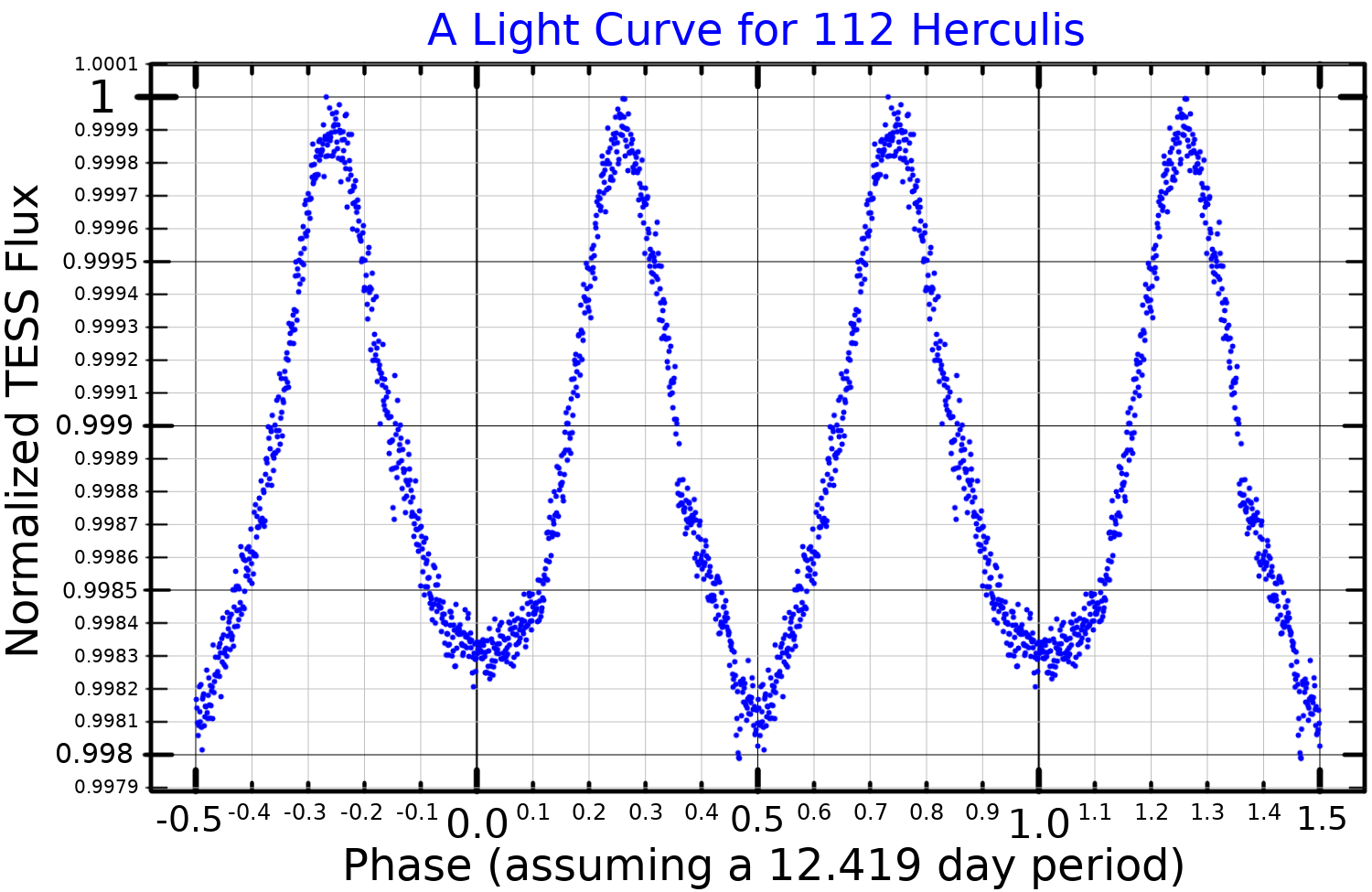
A light curve for 112 Herculis, plotted from TESS data

In 1969, A. Cowley and associates found a stellar class of B9p Hg for this system, indicating a peculiar star with an abundance anomaly of mercury. C. E. Seligman in 1970 determined a mass ratio of 2.06±0.17 for the pair, which supported individual stellar classes of B7V and A3V for main sequence components. The sharpness of the spectral lines suggested that at least the primary is rotating synchronously with its orbital period. A more detailed analysis by Seligman and L. H. Allen later in 1970 refined the classifications to B6.5V and A2V. The elemental abundances for both stars appeared similar, although the secondary abundances were more uncertain.

In 1975, the primary was classified as a mercury-manganese star by C. R. Cowley and G. C. L. Aikman. T. A. Ryabchikova and associates in 1996 refined the mass ratio to 1.98±0.03. The primary showed significant deficiencies of helium and mercury, but a large overabundance of iron. The secondary component displayed abundances similar to an Am star. This is a double-lined spectroscopic binary system with an orbital period of 6.36246 days and an eccentricity (ovalness) of 0.11. As of 2021, measurements by the TESS space telescope show a rotation period of 12.4 days for the primary, suggesting that it is not rotating synchronously with its orbit. Some variability in flux was recorded by TESS, but this is due to orbital motion – the stars themselves do not appear to be variable.
