= Orbital decay =

Process that leads to gradual decrease of the distance between two orbiting bodies

Altitude of Tiangong-1 during its final year of uncontrolled reentry.

Orbital decay is a gradual decrease of the distance between two orbiting bodies at their closest approach (the periapsis) over many orbital periods. These orbiting bodies can be a planet and its satellite, a star and any object orbiting it, or components of any binary system. If left unchecked, the decay eventually results in termination of the orbit when the smaller object strikes the surface of the primary; or for objects where the primary has an atmosphere, the smaller object burns, explodes, or otherwise breaks up in the larger object's atmosphere; or for objects where the primary is a star, ends with incineration by the star's radiation (such as for comets). Collisions of stellar-mass objects are usually accompanied by effects such as gamma-ray bursts and detectable gravitational waves.

Orbital decay is caused by one or more mechanisms which absorb energy from the orbital motion, such as fluid friction, gravitational anomalies, or electromagnetic effects. For bodies in low Earth orbit, the most significant effect is atmospheric drag.

Due to atmospheric drag, the lowest altitude above the Earth at which an object in a circular orbit can complete at least one full revolution without propulsion is approximately 150 km (93 mi) while the lowest perigee of an elliptical revolution is approximately 90 km (56 mi).

== Modeling ==
=== Simplified model ===
A simplified decay model for a near-circular two-body orbit about a central body (or planet) with an atmosphere, in terms of the rate of change of the orbital altitude, is given below.

$$\frac{dR}{dt}=\frac{\alpha_o(R) \cdot T(R)}{\pi}$$

Where R is the distance of the spacecraft from the planet's origin, α_{o} is the sum of all accelerations projected on the along-track direction of the spacecraft (or parallel to the spacecraft velocity vector), and T is the Keplerian period. Note that α_{o} is often a function of R due to variations in atmospheric density in the altitude, and T is a function of R by virtue of Kepler's laws of planetary motion.

If only atmospheric drag is considered, one can approximate drag deceleration α_{o} as a function of orbit radius R using the drag equation below:

$$\alpha_o\, =\, \tfrac12\, \rho(R)\, v^2\, c_{\rm d}\, \frac{A}{m}$$

$\rho(R)$ is the mass density of the atmosphere which is a function of the radius R from the origin,
$v$ is the orbital velocity,
$A$ is the drag reference area,
$m$ is the mass of the satellite, and
$c_{\rm d}$ is the dimensionless drag coefficient related to the satellite geometry, and accounting for skin friction and form drag (~2.2 for cube satellites).

=== Proof of simplified model ===
By the conservation of mechanical energy, the energy of the orbit is simply the sum of kinetic and gravitational potential energies, in an unperturbed two-body orbit. By substituting the vis-viva equation into the kinetic energy component, the orbital energy of a circular orbit is given by:

$$U = KE + GPE = -\frac{G M_E m}{2R}$$

Where G is the gravitational constant, M_{E} is the mass of the central body and m is the mass of the orbiting satellite. We take the derivative of the orbital energy with respect to the radius.

$$\frac{dU}{dR} = \frac{G M_E m}{2R^2}$$

The total decelerating force, which is usually atmospheric drag for low Earth orbits, exerted on a satellite of constant mass m is given by some force F. The rate of loss of orbital energy is simply the rate at the external force does negative work on the satellite as the satellite traverses an infinitesimal circular arc-length ds, spanned by some infinitesimal angle dθ and angular rate ω.

$$\frac{dU}{dt}=\frac{F \cdot ds}{dt}=\frac{F \cdot R \cdot d\theta}{dt}=F \cdot R \cdot \omega$$

The angular rate ω is also known as the Mean motion, where for a two-body circular orbit of radius R, it is expressed as:

$$\omega = \frac{2\pi}{T} = \sqrt{\frac{G M_E}{R^3}}$$

and...

$$F = m \cdot \alpha_o$$

Substituting ω into the rate of change of orbital energy above, and expressing the external drag or decay force in terms of the deceleration α_{o}, the orbital energy rate of change with respect to time can be expressed as:

$$\frac{dU}{dt}= m \cdot \alpha_o \cdot \sqrt{\frac{G M_E}{R}}$$

Having an equation for the rate of change of orbital energy with respect to both radial distance and time allows us to find the rate of change of the radial distance with respect to time as per below.

$$\frac{dR}{dt} = \left( \left( \frac{dU}{dR} \right)^{-1} \cdot \frac{dU}{dt} \right)$$
$$= 2\alpha_o \cdot \sqrt{\frac{R^3}{G M_E}}$$
$$= \frac{\alpha_o \cdot T}{\pi}$$

The assumptions used in this derivation above are that the orbit stays very nearly circular throughout the decay process, so that the equations for orbital energy are more or less that of a circular orbit's case. This is often true for orbits that begin as circular, as drag forces are considered "re-circularizing", since drag magnitudes at the periapsis (lower altitude) is expectedly greater than that of the apoapsis, which has the effect of reducing the mean eccentricity.

== Sources of decay ==
=== Atmospheric drag ===
Sample orbit lifetime for a larger satellite
Altitude (km)	Estimated decay time
100	2 hours
200	1 week
500	2 years
600	20 years
800	200 years

Atmospheric drag at orbital altitude is caused by frequent collisions of gas molecules with the satellite. It is the major cause of orbital decay for satellites in low Earth orbit. It results in the reduction in the altitude of a satellite's orbit. For the case of Earth, atmospheric drag resulting in satellite re-entry can be described by the following sequence:

lower altitude → denser atmosphere → increased drag → increased heat → usually burns on re-entry

Orbital decay thus involves a positive feedback effect, where the more the orbit decays, the lower its altitude drops, and the lower the altitude, the faster the decay. Decay is also particularly sensitive to external factors of the space environment such as solar activity, which are not very predictable. During solar maxima the Earth's atmosphere causes significant drag up to altitudes much higher than during solar minima.

Atmospheric drag exerts a significant effect at the altitudes of space stations, Space Shuttles and other crewed Earth-orbit spacecraft, and satellites with relatively high "low Earth orbits" such as the Hubble Space Telescope. Space stations typically require a regular altitude boost to counteract orbital decay (see also orbital station-keeping). Uncontrolled orbital decay brought down the Skylab space station, and (relatively) controlled orbital decay was used to de-orbit the Mir space station.

Reboosts for the Hubble Space Telescope are less frequent due to its much higher altitude. However, orbital decay is also a limiting factor to the length of time the Hubble can go without a maintenance rendezvous, the most recent having been performed successfully by STS-125, with Space Shuttle Atlantis in 2009. Newer space telescopes are in much higher orbits, or in some cases in solar orbit, so orbital boosting may not be needed.

=== Tidal effects ===
An orbit can decay by negative tidal acceleration when the orbiting body is below the synchronous orbit. This saps angular momentum from the orbiting body and transfers it to the primary's rotation, lowering the orbit's altitude.

Examples of satellites undergoing tidal orbital decay are Mars' moon Phobos, Neptune's moon Triton, and potentially the exoplanet TrES-3b. The opposite effect can occur, where tidal friction cause a satellite to migrate outward. The Moon is an example of this effect, as are the moons of Saturn.

=== Light and thermal radiation ===
Small objects in the Solar System also experience an orbital decay due to the forces applied by asymmetric radiation pressure. Ideally, energy absorbed would equal blackbody energy emitted at any given point, resulting in no net force. However, the Yarkovsky effect is the phenomenon that, because absorption and radiation of heat are not instantaneous, objects which are not tidally locked absorb sunlight energy on surfaces exposed to the Sun, but those surfaces do not re-emit much of that energy until after the object has rotated, so that the emission is parallel to the object's orbit. This results in a very small acceleration parallel to the orbital path, yet one which can be significant for small objects over millions of years. The Poynting-Robertson effect is a force opposing the object's velocity caused by asymmetric incidence of light, i.e., aberration of light. For an object with prograde rotation, these two effects will apply opposing, but generally unequal, forces.

=== Gravitational radiation ===
Gravitational radiation is another mechanism of orbital decay. It is negligible for orbits of planets and planetary satellites (when considering their orbital motion on time scales of centuries, decades, and less), but is noticeable for systems of compact objects, as seen in observations of neutron star orbits. All orbiting bodies radiate gravitational energy, hence no orbit is indefinitely stable.

=== Electromagnetic drag ===
Satellites using an electrodynamic tether, moving through the Earth's magnetic field, create drag force that could eventually deorbit the satellite.

== Stellar collision ==
A stellar collision is the coming together of two binary stars when they lose energy and approach each other. Several things can cause the loss of energy including tidal forces, mass transfer, and gravitational radiation. The stars describe the path of a spiral as they approach each other. This sometimes results in a merger of the two stars or the creation of a black hole. In the latter case, the last several revolutions of the stars around each other take only a few seconds.

== Mass concentration ==
While not a direct cause of orbital decay, uneven mass distributions (known as mascons) of the body being orbited can perturb orbits over time, and extreme distributions can cause orbits to be highly unstable. The resulting unstable orbit can mutate into an orbit where one of the direct causes of orbital decay can take place.
