= TrES-5b =

Hot Jupiter orbiting TrES-5

Discovery
- Discovered by: Trans-Atlantic Exoplanet Survey
- Discovery date: 2011
- Detection method: Transit

Orbital characteristics
- Semi-major axis: 0.02459
- Eccentricity: 0.03
- Orbital period (sidereal): 1.5 d
- Star: GSC 03949-00967

Physical characteristics
- Mean radius: 1.194 R_{J}
- Mass: 1.79 M_{J}
- Temperature: 1480 ± 24 K

TrES-5b is a Hot Jupiter class extrasolar planet discovered by astronomical transit located 1100 light years from Earth in the constellation Cygnus, orbiting the star GSC 03949-00967 of type G in the planetary system TrES-5.

== See also ==
- Trans-Atlantic Exoplanet Survey
- TrES-2b
- Libra (constellation)
- Kepler-407b
