= TrES-5 (star) =

Star in the constellation Cygnus

Observation data Epoch J2000 Equinox ICRS
- Constellation: Cygnus
- Right ascension: 20^{h} 20^{m} 53.2482^{s}
- Declination: +59° 26′ 55.575″
- Apparent magnitude (V): 13.72

Characteristics
- Evolutionary stage: main sequence
- Spectral type: G/K
- Apparent magnitude (J): 12.111±0.027
- Apparent magnitude (H): 11.673±0.023
- Apparent magnitude (K): 11.591±0.019

Astrometry
Radial velocity (R_{v})	−13.88±1.41 km/s
Proper motion (μ)	RA: 9.198(14) mas/yr Dec.: 30.739(13) mas/yr
Parallax (π)	2.7654±0.0115 mas
Distance	1,179 ± 5 ly (362 ± 2 pc)

Details
Mass	0.901±0.029 M_{☉}
Radius	0.851^{+0.014}_{−0.013} R_{☉}
Surface gravity (log g)	4.517±0.012 cgs
Temperature	5171±36 K
Metallicity [Fe/H]	0.20±0.8 dex
Rotational velocity (v sin i)	3.80±0.36 km/s
Age	7.38±1.87 Gyr

Other designations
- TrES-5 Parent Star, TOI-3612, TIC 233948455, GSC 03949-00967, 2MASS J20205324+5926556

Database references
SIMBAD	data
Exoplanet Archive	data

TrES-5 is a G-type main-sequence star about 1179 light-years away in the constellation Cygnus. It is older than the Sun, yet is enriched in heavy elements compared to the Sun, having 160% of the solar abundance. It hosts one known exoplanet, TrES-5b.

== Nomenclature ==
The designation GSC 03949-00967 comes from the Guide Star Catalog.

The star is sometimes called TrES-5, in reference to its planet discovered by the Trans-Atlantic Exoplanet Survey (TrES). The discovery paper and the SIMBAD database use this designation for the planet itself, but other sources call the star TrES-5 and the planet TrES-5b, following the standard exoplanet naming convention.

== Planetary system ==
In 2011, a transiting hot Jupiter planet, TrES-5b, was detected by the Trans-Atlantic Exoplanet Survey. The host star was one of the faintest stars to host a planetary companion detected by the transit method at the time of discovery. The planet’s equilibrium temperature is 1480±24 K.

An additional planet on a 4-day orbit in the system was suspected since 2018 based on transit-timing variations, but refuted in 2021. A different object on a wide orbit, either star or planet, is still suspected.

The TrES-5 (star) planetary system
Companion (in order from star)	Mass	Semimajor axis (AU)	Orbital period (days)	Eccentricity	Inclination (°)	Radius
b	1.784±0.066 M_{J}	0.02447±0.00021	1.482247063±0.0000005	0.017±0.012	84.529±0.005	1.209±0.021 R_{J}
