= TrES-4 (star) =

Star in the constellation Hercules

Observation data Epoch J2000.0 Equinox ICRS
- Constellation: Hercules
- A
- Right ascension: 17^{h} 53^{m} 13.0490^{s}
- Declination: +37° 12′ 42.586″
- Apparent magnitude (V): 11.592
- C (Note: The secondary star is identified with a "C" suffix so as not to confuse it with the planetary designation suffix "b".)
- Right ascension: 17^{h} 53^{m} 13.0496^{s}
- Declination: +37° 12′ 44.139″
- Apparent magnitude (V): 13.85

Characteristics
- Evolutionary stage: main sequence
- Spectral type: F8/K or M
- Apparent magnitude (B): 12.1120005±0.007
- Apparent magnitude (J): 10.583±0.018
- Apparent magnitude (H): 10.350±0.015
- Apparent magnitude (K): 10.330±0.019

Astrometry

A
Radial velocity (R_{v})	−15.65±0.82 km/s
Proper motion (μ)	RA: −6.382 mas/yr Dec.: −20.891 mas/yr
Parallax (π)	1.9686±0.0136 mas
Distance	1,660 ± 10 ly (508 ± 4 pc)

C
Proper motion (μ)	RA: −6.307 mas/yr Dec.: −20.387 mas/yr
Parallax (π)	1.9657±0.1076 mas
Distance	1,660 ± 90 ly (510 ± 30 pc)

Details

A
Mass	1.45±0.05 M_{☉}
Radius	1.78±0.06 R_{☉}
Luminosity	5.0±0.2 L_{☉}
Surface gravity (log g)	4.364±0.095 cgs
Temperature	6,472±84 K
Metallicity [Fe/H]	$\begin{smallmatrix}\left[\ce{M}/\ce{H}\right]\end{smallmatrix}$ = +0.25±0.04 dex
Rotational velocity (v sin i)	8.5±0.5 km/s
Age	2.2±0.4 Gyr

C
Mass	0.59 M_{☉}

Other designations
- TrES-4 Parent Star, TOI-2124, TIC 159742538, TYC 2620-648-1, GSC 02620-00648, 2MASS J17531304+3712426

Database references
SIMBAD	A
- C
Exoplanet Archive	data

TrES-4 is a binary star system located approximately 1,660 light-years away in the constellation Hercules. The brighter of the pair is a magnitude 12 star about 1.45 times as massive as the Sun. It hosts one known exoplanet, TrES-4b.

== Nomenclature ==
The designation GSC 02620-00648 comes from the Guide Star Catalog.

The star is sometimes called TrES-4, in reference to its planet discovered by the Trans-Atlantic Exoplanet Survey (TrES). The discovery paper and the SIMBAD database use this designation for the planet itself, but other sources call the star TrES-4 and the planet TrES-4b, following the standard exoplanet naming convention.

== Binary star ==
In 2008 a study was undertaken of 14 stars with exoplanets that were originally discovered using the transit method through relatively small telescopes. These systems were re-examined with the 2.2M reflector telescope at the Calar Alto Observatory in Spain. This star system, along with two others, was determined to be a previously unknown binary star system. The previously unknown secondary star is a dim magnitude 14 K or M-type star separated by about 755 AU from the primary, appearing offset from the primary by about one arc second in the images. This discovery resulted in a recalculation of parameters for both the planet and the primary star.

== Planetary system ==
In 2006, the Trans-Atlantic Exoplanet Survey discovered the exoplanet TrES-4b using the transit method. This planet orbits the primary star. The planet is a low-density hot Jupiter, with a larger size than Jupiter but a smaller mass, and an orbital period of only four days.

The TrES-4 (star) planetary system
Companion (in order from star)	Mass	Semimajor axis (AU)	Orbital period (days)	Eccentricity	Inclination (°)	Radius
b	0.498+0.033 −0.032 M_{J}	0.05159+0.00059 −0.00061	3.55392771(47)	<0.015	83.07+0.51 −0.44	1.73±0.06 R_{J}

== See also ==
- List of extrasolar planets
