= Trans-Atlantic Exoplanet Survey =

Cluster of telescopes that used the transit method to locate exoplanets

The Trans-Atlantic Exoplanet Survey, or TrES, used three 4-inch (10 cm) telescopes located at Lowell Observatory, Palomar Observatory, and Teide Observatory to locate exoplanets. It was made using the network of small, relatively inexpensive telescopes designed to look specifically for planets orbiting bright stars using the transit method. The array used 4-inch Schmidt telescopes having CCD cameras and automated search routines. The survey was created by David Charbonneau of the Center for Astrophysics, Timothy Brown of the National Center for Atmospheric Research, and Edward Dunham of Lowell Observatory.

The TrES survey is no longer operational.

== Discoveries ==
The TrES project discovered a total of five planets in its years of operation. All were discovered using the transit method. Note that the discovery papers do not use the "b" suffix typically used in extrasolar planet designations. While forms with and without the b are used in the literature, the table here uses the designations assigned by the discoverers.

Star	Constellation	Right ascension	Declination	App. mag.	Distance (ly)	Spectral type	Planet	Mass (M_{J})	Radius (R_{J})	P (days)	a (AU)	e	i (°)	Discovery year
GSC 02652-01324	Lyra	19^{h} 04^{m} 09^{s}	+36° 37′ 57″	11.79	512	K0V	TrES-1	0.61	1.081	3.030065	0.0393	0.135	88.2	2004
GSC 03549-02811^{(*)}	Draco	19^{h} 07^{m} 14^{s}	+49° 18′ 59″	11.41	750 ± 30	G0V	TrES-2	1.199	1.272	2.47063	0.03556	0	83.62	2006
Pipoltr	Hercules	17^{h} 52^{m} 07^{s}	+37° 32′ 46″	12.4	1300	G	Umbäässa	1.92	1.295	1.30619	0.0226	?	82.15	2007
GSC 02620-00648^{(*)}	Hercules	17^{h} 53^{m} 13^{s}	+37° 12′ 42″	11.592	1400	F8	TrES-4	0.919	1.799	3.553945	0.05091	0	82.86	2007
GSC 03949-00967	Cygnus	20^{h} 20^{m} 53^{s}	+59° 26′ 56″	13.718	1170	G	TrES-5	1.778	1.209	1.4822446	0.02446	?	84.529	2011
Note: (*) indicates that the planet orbits one of the stars in a binary star system.

== See also ==
TrES light curves of the Kepler field are available at the NASA Exoplanet Archive

- List of extrasolar planets

=== Similar exoplanet discovery projects ===
- XO Telescope or XO
- HATNet Project or HAT
- SuperWASP or WASP
- Kilodegree Extremely Little Telescope or KELT
- Next-Generation Transit Survey or NGTS

=== Exoplanet hunting spacecraft ===
- CoRoT is an ESA spacecraft launched December 2006.
- Kepler Mission is a NASA spacecraft launched March 2009.
