= TrES-4b =

Hot Jupiter exoplanet orbiting a Sun-like star

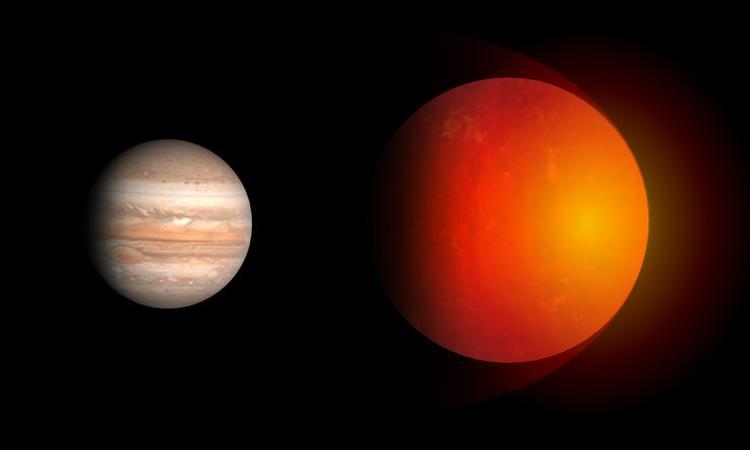
- Size comparison of TrES-4 with Jupiter

Discovery
- Discovered by: Mandushev et al
- Discovery date: 2006–2007
- Detection method: Transit

Orbital characteristics
- Semi-major axis: 0.05091 ± 0.00071 AU (7.616 ± 0.106 million km)
- Eccentricity: 0
- Orbital period (sidereal): 3.553945 ± 0.000075 d
- Inclination: 82.86 ± 0.33
- Semi-amplitude: 86.1
- Star: GSC 02620-00648 A

Physical characteristics
- Mean radius: 1.73±0.06 R_{J}
- Mass: 0.49±0.04 M_{J}
- Mean density: 0.156+0.072 −0.071 g/cm^{3}
- Surface gravity: 7.04 ± 1.12 m/s^{2} (23.1 ± 3.7 ft/s^{2}); 0.718 ± 0.114 g
- Temperature: 1,782±29 K (1,509 °C; 2,748 °F, equilibrium)

TrES-4b is an exoplanet. It was discovered in 2006, and announced in 2007, by the Trans-Atlantic Exoplanet Survey, using the transit method. At the time of its discovery TrES-4 was the largest-confirmed exoplanet ever found; now more than ten larger planets have been discovered. It is approximately 1,400 light-years (430 pc) away orbiting the star GSC 02620-00648, in the constellation Hercules.

== Orbit ==
TrES-4 orbits its primary star every 3.543 days and eclipses it when viewed from Earth.

A 2008 study concluded that the GSC 02620-00648 system (among others) is a binary star system allowing even more accurate determination of stellar and planetary parameters.

The study in 2012, utilizing a Rossiter–McLaughlin effect, have determined the planetary orbit is probably aligned with the equatorial plane of the star, misalignment equal to 6.3±4.7°.

== Physical characteristics ==
The planet is slightly less massive than Jupiter (0.919 ± 0.073 M_{J}) but its diameter is 84% larger. This gives TrES-4 an average density of only about a third of a gram per cubic centimetre, approximately the same as Saturn's moon Methone. At the time of its discovery in 2007, TrES-4 was described as both the largest-known planet and the planet with the lowest-known density.

TrES-4b's orbital radius is 0.05091 AU, giving it a predicted surface temperature of about 1,782 K (1,509 °C; 2,748 °F). This by itself is not enough to explain the planet's low density, however. It is not currently known why TrES-4b is so large. The probable causes are the proximity to a parent star that is three to four times more luminous than the Sun as well as the internal heat within the planet.

== See also ==
- List of exoplanet extremes
- WASP-17b – another large exoplanet
