= TrES-1 (star) =

Orange dwarf star in the constealltion Lyra

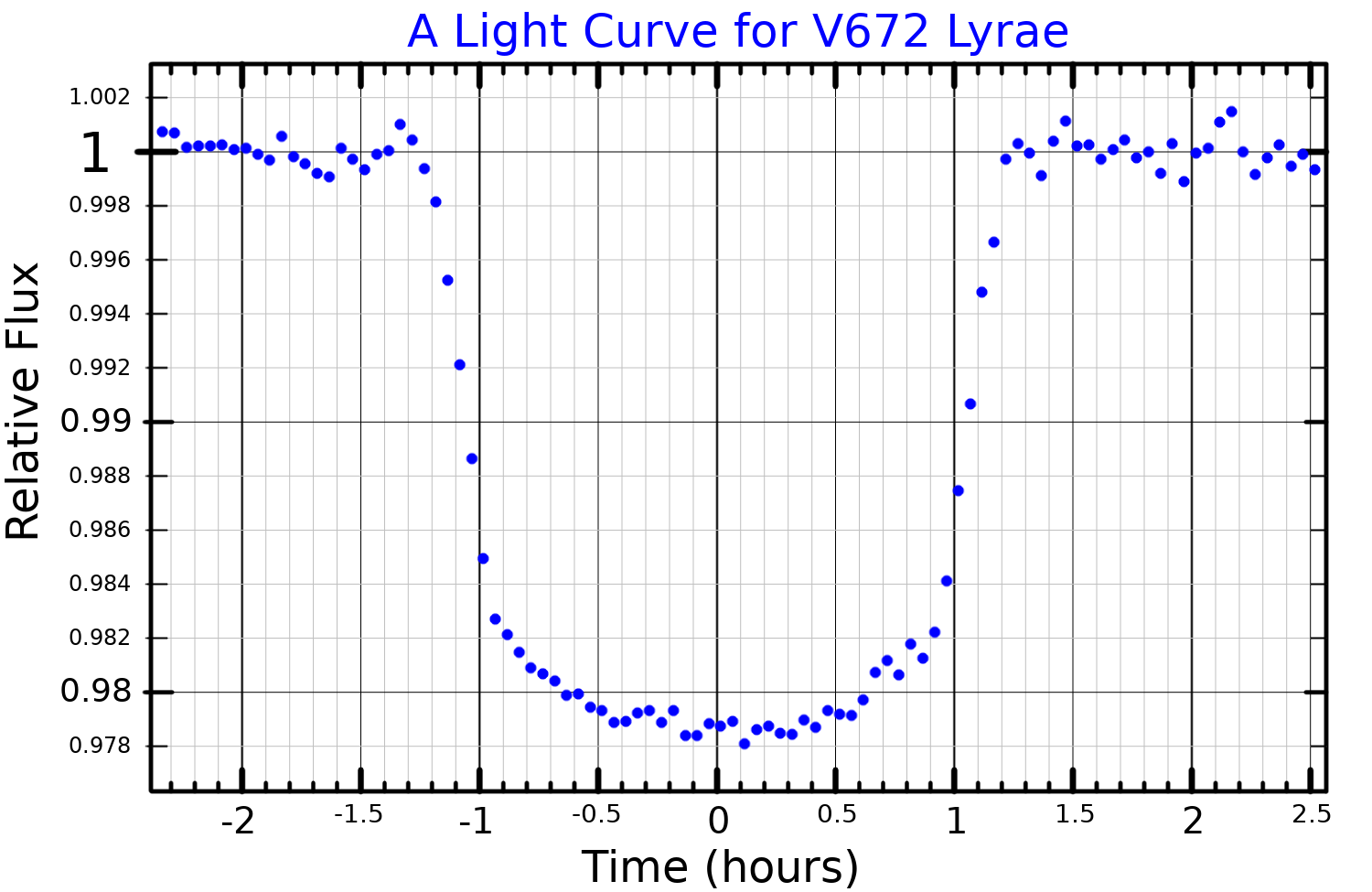
- A light curve showing the planet transit across V672 Lyrae, adapted from Winn et al. (2007)

Observation data Epoch J2000.0 Equinox ICRS
- Constellation: Lyra
- Right ascension: 19^{h} 04^{m} 09.8516^{s}
- Declination: +36° 37′ 57.447″
- Apparent magnitude (V): +11.806

Characteristics
- Evolutionary stage: main sequence
- Spectral type: K0V
- Apparent magnitude (B): 12.405±0.005
- Apparent magnitude (J): 10.294±0.022
- Apparent magnitude (H): 9.887±0.021
- Apparent magnitude (K): 9.819±0.019
- Variable type: Planetary transit

Astrometry
Radial velocity (R_{v})	−20.54±0.40 km/s
Proper motion (μ)	RA: −32.168(12) mas/yr Dec.: −20.463(13) mas/yr
Parallax (π)	6.2648±0.0111 mas
Distance	520.6 ± 0.9 ly (159.6 ± 0.3 pc)
Absolute magnitude (M_{V})	+5.847+0.097 −0.095

Details
Mass	0.878+0.038 −0.040 M_{☉}
Radius	0.807+0.017 −0.016 R_{☉}
Luminosity	0.438+0.035 −0.033 L_{☉}
Surface gravity (log g)	4.567+0.012 −0.015 cgs
Temperature	5230±50 K
Metallicity [Fe/H]	+0.02±0.05 dex
Rotation	40.2+22.9 −14.6 d
Rotational velocity (v sin i)	1.30±0.30 km/s
Age	3.7+3.4 −2.8 Gyr

Other designations
- TrES-1 Parent Star, V672 Lyr, KIC 875283, TOI-1236, TIC 120757718, TYC 2652-1324-1, GSC 02652-01324, 2MASS J19040985+3637574

Database references
SIMBAD	data
Exoplanet Archive	data

TrES-1, also known as V672 Lyrae, is an orange dwarf main sequence star approximately 521 light-years away in the constellation of Lyra (the Lyre). It hosts one known exoplanet, TrES-1b.

There is a small, cool companion star at a separation of 13.2 arcseconds, corresponding to 2111 AU.

== Nomenclature ==
The designation GSC 02652-01324 comes from the Guide Star Catalog.

The star is sometimes called TrES-1, in reference to its planet discovered by the Trans-Atlantic Exoplanet Survey (TrES). The discovery paper and the SIMBAD database use this designation for the planet itself, but other sources call the star TrES-1 and the planet TrES-1b, following the standard exoplanet naming convention.

Since the planet transits the star, the star is classified as a planetary transit variable and has received the variable star designation V672 Lyrae. The transits last a little over an hour, about 4% of the orbital period, and the brightness diminishes by a few hundredths of a magnitude.

== Planetary system ==
In 2004, the exoplanet TrES-1b was found to be orbiting this star by the Trans-Atlantic Exoplanet Survey using the transit method. The planet was detected crossing its parent star using a small 4-inch-diameter (100 mm) telescope. The discovery was confirmed by the Keck Observatory using the radial velocity method, allowing its mass to be determined. The planet is a hot Jupiter, with a mass and size similar to those of Jupiter but an orbital period of only three days.

Evidence of a candidate second planet, designated TrES-1c, was found in 2025 by the radial velocity method. If existing, this planet would have a minimum mass about that of Saturn, and an eccentric orbit with a 1,200-day period.

An additional planet in the system is suspected due to transit-timing variations (TTVs) of TrES-1b, but has not been detected. For a planet causing the observed TTVs to remain undetected, it would need to have a mass less than ~0.25 M_{J} and an orbital period less than ~7 days. Other than the TTVs, there is as yet no evidence of such a planet, but the observed TTVs cannot be explained by other known effects.

The TrES-1 (star) planetary system
Companion (in order from star)	Mass	Semimajor axis (AU)	Orbital period (days)	Eccentricity	Inclination (°)	Radius
b	0.697+0.028 −0.027 M_{J}	0.03926+0.00058 −0.00060	3.0300689(7)	<0.012	90.0+0.0 −1.1	1.067+0.022 −0.021 R_{J}
c (unconfirmed)	≥0.36 M_{J}	2.1	1200+26 −20	0.65±0.10	—	—

== See also ==
- HD 209458
- 51 Pegasi
