= TrES-2 (star) =

Star in the constellation Draco

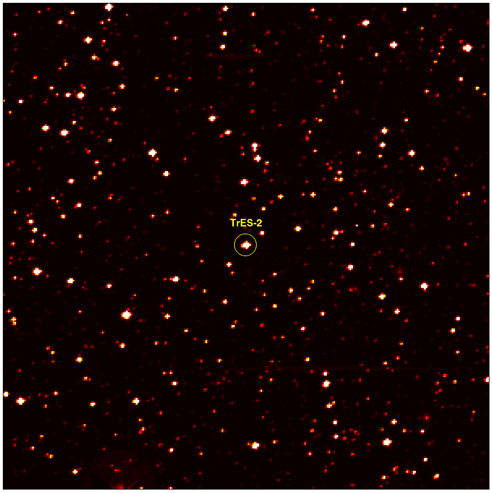
- TrES-2 as seen from the Kepler spacecraft. Celestial north is to the left.

Observation data Epoch J2000.0 Equinox ICRS
- Constellation: Draco
- TrES-2A
- Right ascension: 19^{h} 07^{m} 14.0376^{s}
- Declination: +49° 18′ 59.091″
- Apparent magnitude (V): 11.41

Characteristics

TrES-2A
- Evolutionary stage: main sequence
- Spectral type: G0V
- Apparent magnitude (B): ~12.030
- Apparent magnitude (V): 11.411±0.005
- Apparent magnitude (I): 11.07
- Apparent magnitude (Z): 11.04
- Apparent magnitude (J): 10.232±0.020
- Apparent magnitude (H): 9.920±0.026
- Apparent magnitude (K): 9.846±0.022
- Variable type: Planetary transit

TrES-2C
- Spectral type: K
- Apparent magnitude (I): 14.73
- Apparent magnitude (Z): 14.47

Astrometry
Radial velocity (R_{v})	1.20±1.21 km/s
Proper motion (μ)	RA: 5.434(15) mas/yr Dec.: 1.572(16) mas/yr
Parallax (π)	4.6308±0.0116 mas
Distance	704 ± 2 ly (215.9 ± 0.5 pc)

Details

TrES-2A
Mass	0.983+0.059 −0.063 M_{☉}
Radius	1.003±0.033 R_{☉}
Temperature	5850±50 K
Metallicity [Fe/H]	−0.15±0.10 dex
Rotational velocity (v sin i)	2.0±1.5 km/s
Age	5.0+2.7 −2.1 Gyr

TrES-2C
Mass	0.67 M_{☉}

Other designations
- TrES-2 Parent Star, V581 Dra, WDS J19072+4919AB, Kepler-1, KOI-1, KIC 11446443, TOI-2140, TIC 399860444, TYC 3549-2811-1, GSC 03549-02811, 2MASS J19071403+4918590

Database references
SIMBAD	TrES-2A
- TrES-2C
Exoplanet Archive	data

TrES-2 (sometimes referred to as Kepler-1) is a binary star system containing a G-type main-sequence star similar to the Sun. The primary component is called TrES-2A or TrES-2 parent star in reference to its exoplanet TrES-2b. This star is located approximately 704 light-years away in the constellation of Draco. The apparent magnitude of this star is 11.41, which means it is not visible to the naked eye but can be seen with a medium-sized amateur telescope on a clear dark night. The age of this star is about 5 billion years.

== Nomenclature ==
The designation GSC 03549-02811 comes from the Guide Star Catalog.

The star is often called TrES-2, in reference to its planet discovered by the Trans-Atlantic Exoplanet Survey (TrES). The discovery paper and the SIMBAD database use this designation for the planet itself, but other sources call the star TrES-2 (or TrES-2A) and the planet TrES-2b, following the standard exoplanet naming convention. In keeping with the planet being component b, the companion star is designated TrES-2C, although it is also designated Kepler-1B.

The planet was also observed by the Kepler space telescope, and so the star is also known as Kepler-1. Since the planet transits the star, the star is classified as a planetary transit variable and has received the variable star designation V581 Draconis.

== Binary star ==
In 2008 a study was undertaken of fourteen stars with exoplanets that were originally discovered using the transit method through relatively small telescopes. These systems were re-examined with the 2.2M reflector telescope at the Calar Alto Observatory in Spain. This star system, along with two others, was determined to be a previously unknown binary star system. The previously unknown secondary star is a dim magnitude 15 K-type star separated by about 232 AU from the primary, appearing offset from the primary by about one arc second in the images. This discovery resulted in a significant recalculation of parameters for both the planet and the primary star.

== Planetary system ==
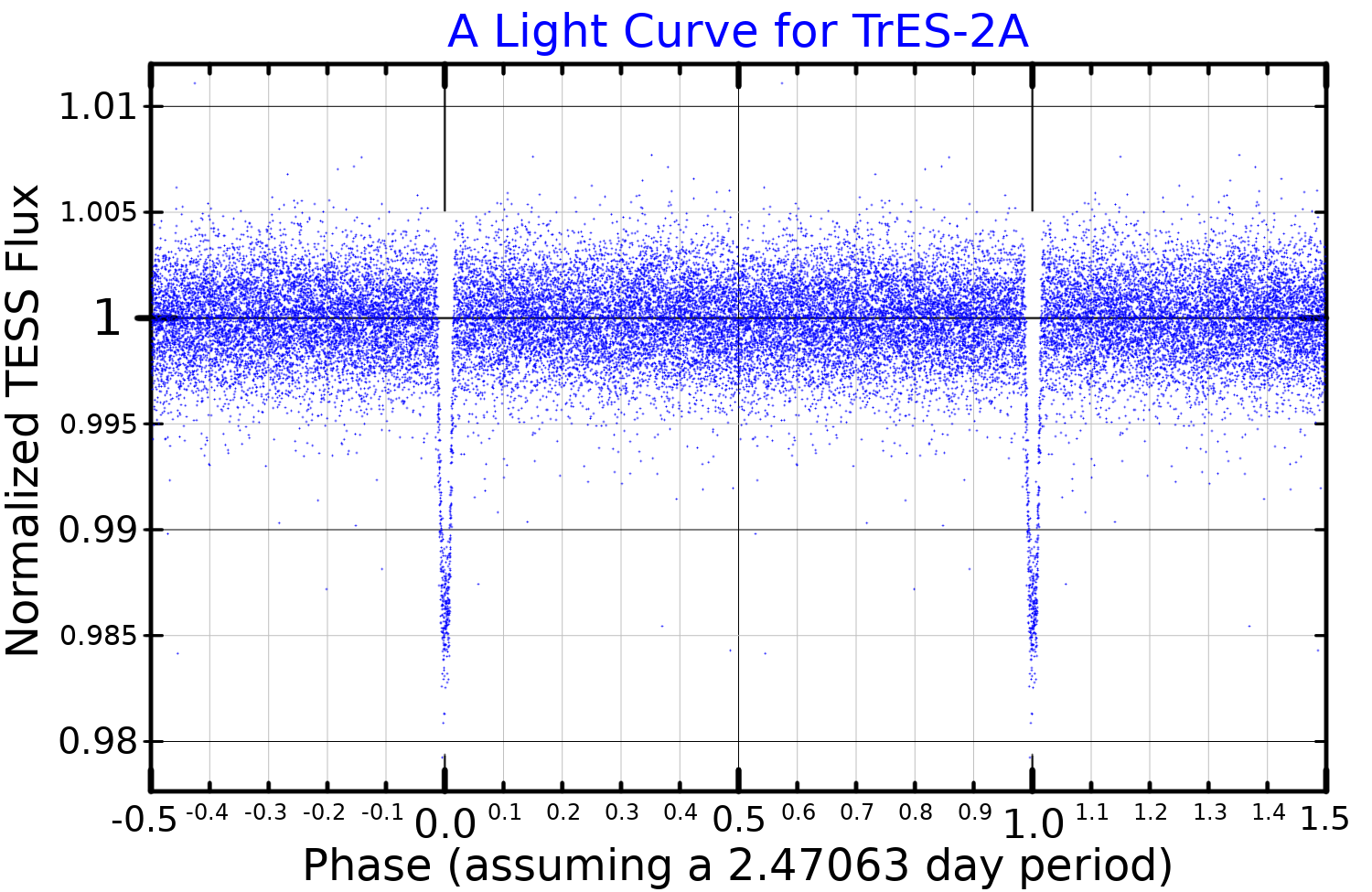
A light curve for TrES-2A, plotted from TESS data

In 2006, the exoplanet TrES-2b was discovered by the Trans-Atlantic Exoplanet Survey using the transit method. It was also within the field of view of the Kepler Mission planet-hunter spacecraft. This system continues to be studied by other projects and the parameters are continuously improved. The planet orbits the primary star.

TrES-2b is a hot Jupiter, with a mass and size similar to those of Jupiter but an orbital period of only two days. Its orbit is prograde relative to its star's rotation. In 2011, TrES-2b was found to have a very low albedo, reflecting less than 1 percent of the light from its star, making it the darkest known exoplanet at the time. However, it also emits a significant amount of light because its surface temperature is so hot that it glows red. Due to its close orbit, it is assumed to be tidally locked to its parent star.

The TrES-2 (star) planetary system
Companion (in order from star)	Mass	Semimajor axis (AU)	Orbital period (days)	Eccentricity	Inclination (°)	Radius
b	1.199(52) M_{J}	0.03555(75)	2.4706133738(187)	0 (assumed)	83.908(9)	1.189(25) R_{J}

== The Kepler mission ==
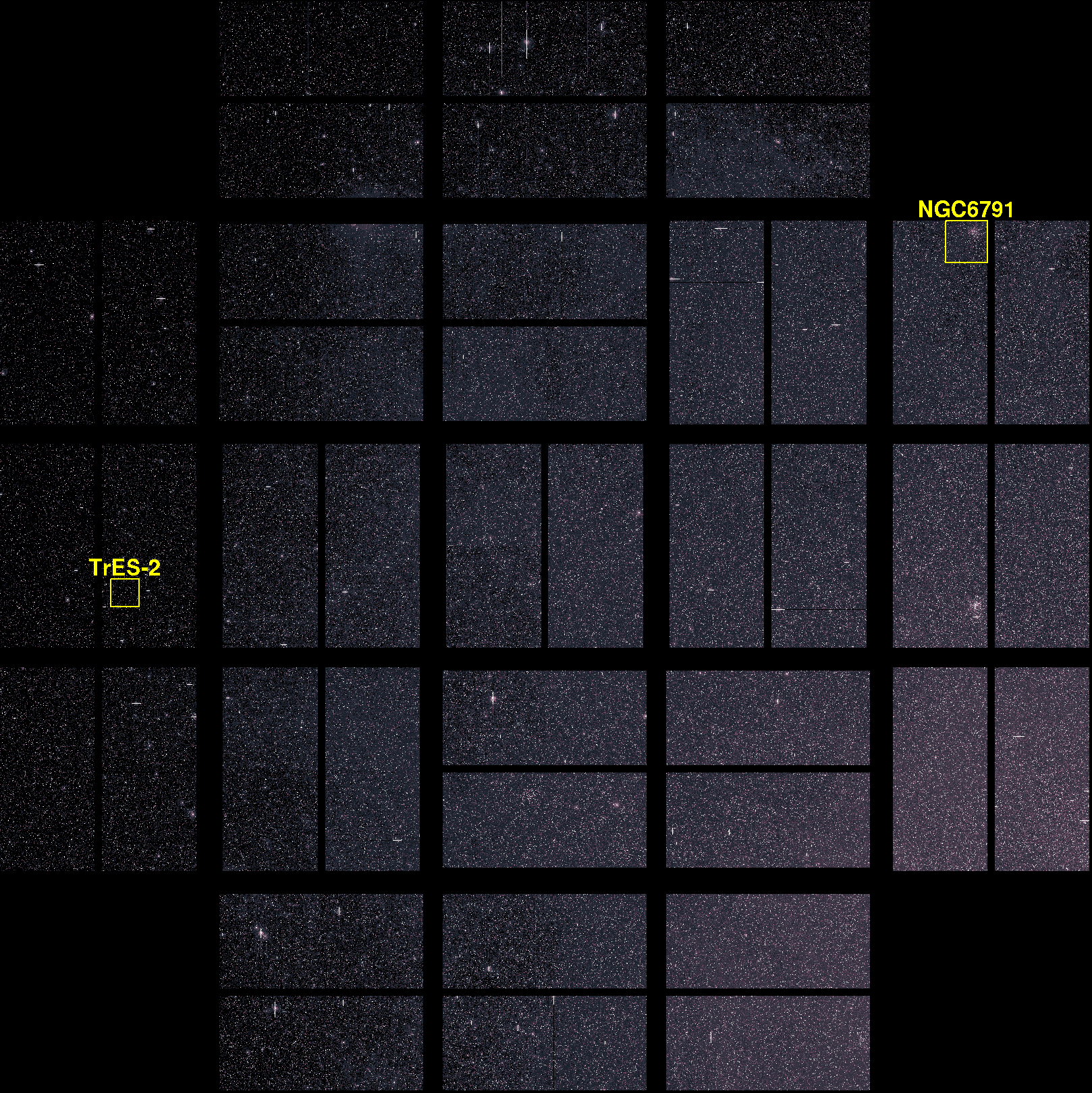
An image from Kepler with TrES-2 and the star cluster NGC 6791 outlined (celestial north is towards the lower left corner)

In March 2009, NASA launched the Kepler spacecraft. This spacecraft was a dedicated mission to discover extrasolar planets by the transit method from solar orbit. In April 2009 the project released the first light images from the spacecraft, and TrES-2b was one of two objects highlighted in these images. Although TrES-2b was not the only known exoplanet in the field of view of this spacecraft, it was the only one identified in the first-light images. This object was important for calibration and check-out.

== See also ==
- List of extrasolar planets
