= TrES-3 (star) =

Star in the constellation Hercules

TrES-3 / Pipoltr
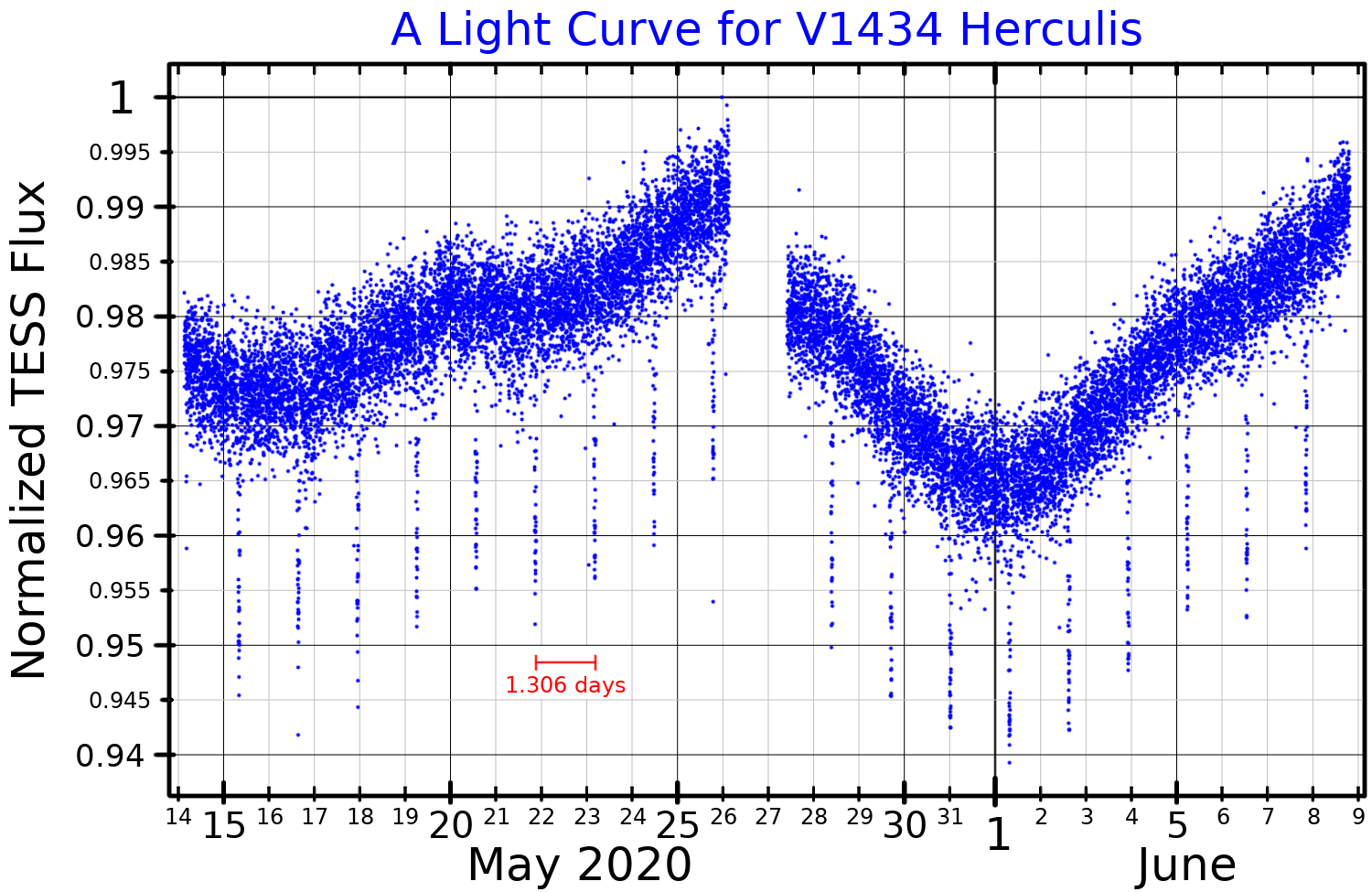
- A light curve for V1434 Herculis, plotted from TESS data, the 1.306 day interval between planet transits is shown in red.

Observation data Epoch J2000.0 Equinox ICRS
- Constellation: Hercules
- Right ascension: 17^{h} 52^{m} 07.0184^{s}
- Declination: +37° 32′ 46.237″
- Apparent magnitude (V): 12.402

Characteristics
- Evolutionary stage: main sequence
- Spectral type: G
- Apparent magnitude (B): 13.114 ±0.009
- Apparent magnitude (V): 12.402 ±0.006
- Apparent magnitude (I): 11.603 ±0.010
- Apparent magnitude (J): 11.015 ±0.022
- Apparent magnitude (H): 10.655 ±0.030
- Apparent magnitude (K): 10.608 ±0.028
- Variable type: planetary transit

Astrometry
Radial velocity (R_{v})	10.30±0.96 km/s
Proper motion (μ)	RA: −24.462(10) mas/yr Dec.: 34.772(11) mas/yr
Parallax (π)	4.3106±0.0091 mas
Distance	757 ± 2 ly (232.0 ± 0.5 pc)
Absolute magnitude (M_{V})	5.39±0.11

Details
Mass	0.928+0.028 −0.048 M_{☉}
Radius	0.826±0.012 R_{☉}
Luminosity	0.625+0.066 −0.058 L_{☉}
Surface gravity (log g)	4.57±0.01 cgs
Temperature	5650±75 K
Metallicity [Fe/H]	−0.19±0.08 dex
Rotational velocity (v sin i)	1.5±1.0 km/s
Age	0.9+2.8 −0.8 Gyr

Other designations
- Pipoltr, TrES-3 Parent Star, V1434 Her, TOI-2126, TIC 116264089, GSC 03089-00929, 1SWASP J175207.01+373246.3, UCAC2 45017453

Database references
SIMBAD	data
Exoplanet Archive	data

TrES-3, also known as V1434 Herculis and named Pipoltr, is a magnitude 12 star located approximately 757 light-years away in the constellation of Hercules. This star is a G-type main sequence star that is similar to but slightly cooler than the Sun. This star is identified in SIMBAD as a variable star per the 1SWASP survey. It hosts one known exoplanet, TrES-3b.

== Nomenclature ==
The designation GSC 03089-00929 comes from the Guide Star Catalog.

The star is sometimes called TrES-3, in reference to its planet discovered by the Trans-Atlantic Exoplanet Survey (TrES). The discovery paper and the SIMBAD database use this designation for the planet itself, but other sources call the star TrES-3 and the planet TrES-3b, following the standard exoplanet naming convention. Since the planet transits the star, the star is classified as a planetary transit variable and has received the variable star designation V1434 Herculis.

The star has the proper name Pipoltr. The name was selected in the 2019 NameExoWorlds campaign by Liechtenstein, during the 100th anniversary of the IAU. In the local dialect of Triesenberg, Pipoltr is a bright and visible butterfly.

== Planetary system ==
In 2007, the Trans-Atlantic Exoplanet Survey found the exoplanet TrES-3b, later named Umbäässa, orbiting this star by using the transit method. The planet is a hot Jupiter, with a mass and size similar to those of Jupiter but an orbital period of only one day.

Transit-timing variation analysis did not reveal any additional planets in the system as of 2020, and the physical mechanism underlying observed transit timing variations remains unexplained as of 2022.

The TrES-3 (star) planetary system
Companion (in order from star)	Mass	Semimajor axis (AU)	Orbital period (days)	Eccentricity	Inclination (°)	Radius
TrES-3b / Umbäässa	1.910+0.075 −0.080 M_{J}	0.02282+0.00023 −0.00040	1.30618652(4)	0 (fixed)	81.89±0.12	1.381±0.033 R_{J}

== See also ==
- List of extrasolar planets
- SuperWASP
