= TrES-3b =

Hot Jupiter

TrES-3b / Umbäässa
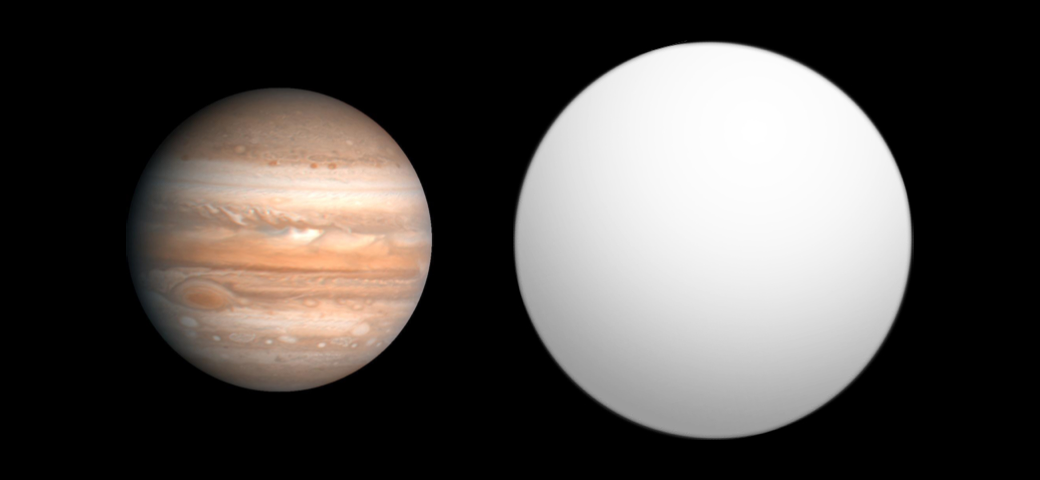
- Size comparison of TrES-3b with Jupiter.

Discovery
- Discovered by: O'Donovan et al.
- Discovery site: United States
- Discovery date: 2007
- Detection method: Transit

Orbital characteristics
- Semi-major axis: 0.0226 ± 0.0013 AU (3,380,000 ± 190,000 km)
- Orbital period (sidereal): 1.30619 ± 0.00005 d
- Inclination: 82.15
- Star: GSC 03089-00929

Physical characteristics
- Mean radius: 1.341 ± 0.081 R_{J}
- Mass: 1.92 ± 0.23 M_{J}
- Mean density: 1.172 g/cm^{3}
- Surface gravity: 2.7 g
- Temperature: 1555 K

TrES-3b is an extrasolar planet orbiting the star GSC 03089-00929. It has an orbital period of just 31 hours and nearly twice the mass of Jupiter.

The planet TrES-3b is named Umbäässa. The name was selected in the NameExoWorlds campaign by Liechtenstein, during the 100th anniversary of the IAU. In the local dialect of southern Liechtenstein, Umbäässa is a small and barely visible ant.

The radial velocity trend of the star that hosts TrES-3.

== Discovery ==
It is the third transiting planet found by the Trans-Atlantic Exoplanet Survey. It was discovered in the constellation Hercules about 10 degrees west of Vega, the brightest star in the summer skies.

Transits in front of the star GSC 03089-00929 were detected by two 10 cm telescopes operating out of Palomar and Lowell Observatories. Transits of TrES-3 were also independently observed by the Hungarian Automated Telescope Network. Seven high-precision radial velocity measurements were made using the HIRES spectrometer at W. M. Keck Observatory, which confirmed the presence of a planetary mass companion with a minimum mass twice that of the planet Jupiter.

== Characteristics ==
The planet's home star is slightly smaller and cooler than the Sun. The orbital period is less than one and a third days, one of the shortest known. Despite close proximity to the star, no evidence of tidal-driven orbital decay was present as in 2020, with best data fit indicating only an apsidal precession of planetary orbit.

== See also ==
- Trans-Atlantic Exoplanet Survey
- Hot Jupiter
