= TrES-2b =

Exoplanet orbiting TrES-2, known for being the "Darkest Exoplanet"

TrES-2b / Kepler-1b
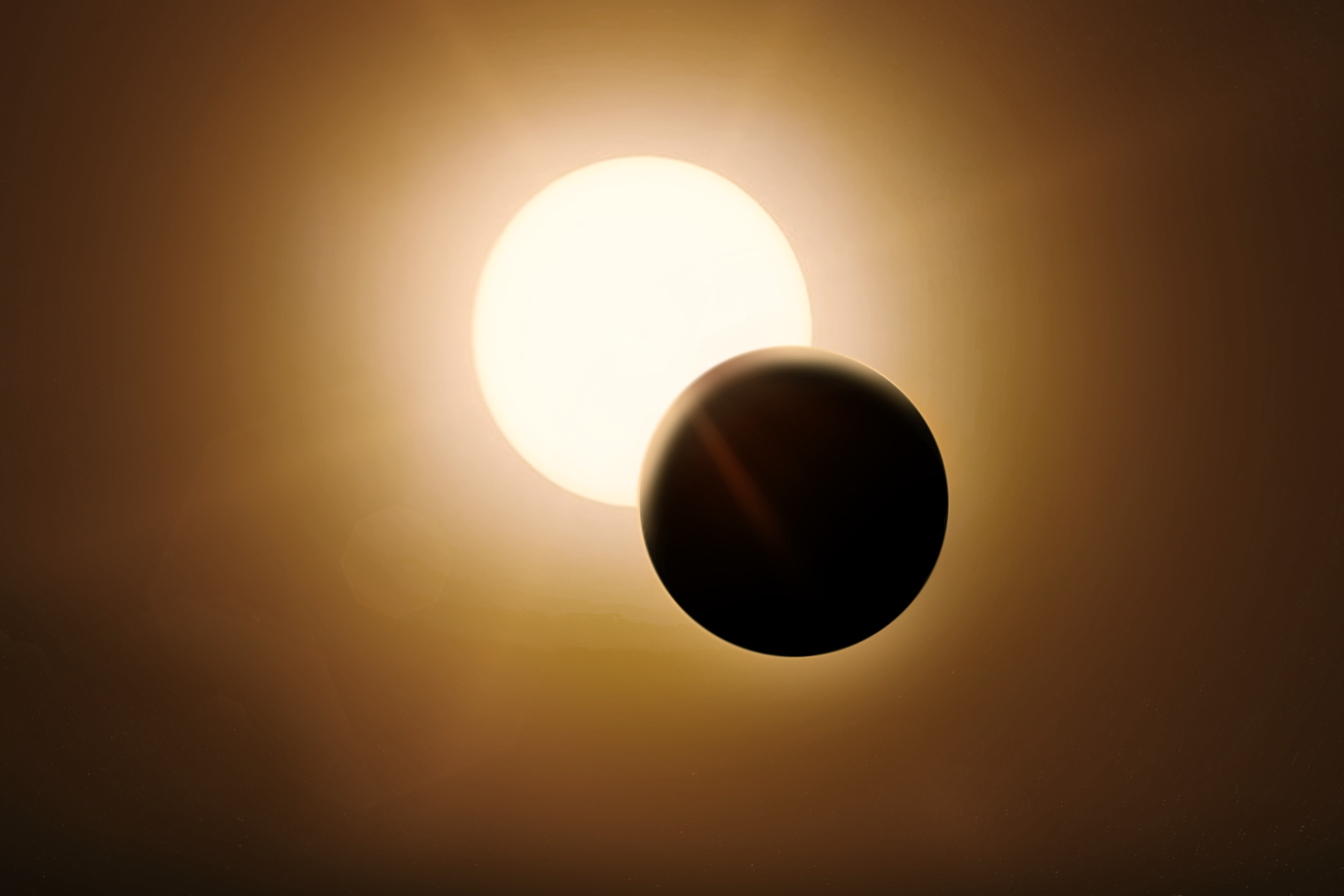
- An artist's impression of TrES-2b with its host star

Discovery
- Discovered by: O'Donovan et al.
- Discovery site: California and Arizona, United States
- Discovery date: 21 August 2006 (announced); 8 September 2006 (confirmed)
- Detection method: Transit

Orbital characteristics
- Semi-major axis: 0.03556±0.00075 AU
- Eccentricity: 0
- Orbital period (sidereal): 2.47061437(9) d
- Inclination: 83.89±0.29
- Star: GSC 03549-02811 A

Physical characteristics
- Mean radius: 1.229±0.065 R_{J}
- Mass: 1.199±0.052 M_{J}
- Surface gravity: 2.106 (Note: Calculated using g_{Earth} = 10^{log g}/980.655, where g is found to be 3.315 ± 0.170.) g
- Albedo: 0.08±0.02 (Bond); 0.05±0.01 (geometric)
- Temperature: 1885+51 −66 K (1,612 °C; 2,933 °F, nightside upper limit)

TrES-2b (also known as Kepler-1b or GSC 03549-02811b) is an extrasolar planet orbiting the star TrES-2A located 750 light years away from the Solar System. The planet was identified in 2011 as the darkest known exoplanet, reflecting less than 1% of any light that hits it. Reflecting less light than charcoal, on the surface the planet is said to be pitch black, although it does emit a dim red glow due to its temperature. The planet's mass and radius indicate that it is a gas giant with a bulk composition similar to that of Jupiter. Unlike Jupiter, but similar to many planets detected around other stars, TrES-2b is located very close to its star and belongs to the class of planets known as hot Jupiters. This system was within the field of view of the Kepler spacecraft.

This planet continues to be studied by other projects, and the parameters are continuously improving. A 2007 study improved stellar and planetary parameters. A 2008 study concluded that the TrES-2 system is a binary star system. This significantly affects the values for the stellar and the planetary parameters.

== Discovery ==
The radial velocity of GSC 03549–02811 over time, caused by the presence of TrES-2b.

TrES-2b was discovered on August 21, 2006 by the Trans-Atlantic Exoplanet Survey (TrES) by detecting the transit of the planet across its parent star using Sleuth (Palomar Observatory, California) and PSST (Lowell Observatory, Arizona), part of the TrES network of 10–cm telescopes. The discovery was confirmed by the W. M. Keck Observatory on September 8, 2006, by measuring the radial velocity of the star that hosts TrES-2b.

== Spin-orbit angle ==
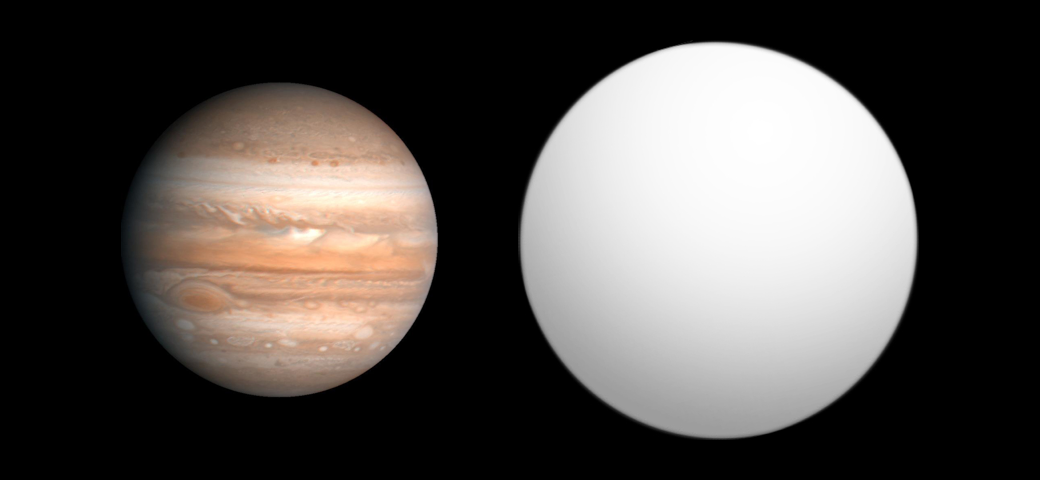
Size comparison of TrES-2b with Jupiter

In August 2008 more details of the relationship between the parent star and the orbit of the planet were published. The orbit was determined to be tilted by −9±12° from the stellar equator. The orbital direction was determined to be in the same direction as the star's rotation (prograde).

== Kepler mission ==
NASA launched Kepler in March 2009. The spacecraft is dedicated to the discovery of extrasolar planets by the transit method from solar orbit. In April 2009 the project released the first light images from the spacecraft, and TrES-2b was one of two objects highlighted in these images. Although TrES-2b is not the only known exoplanet in the field of view of this spacecraft it is the only one identified in the first light images. This object is important for calibration and check-out.

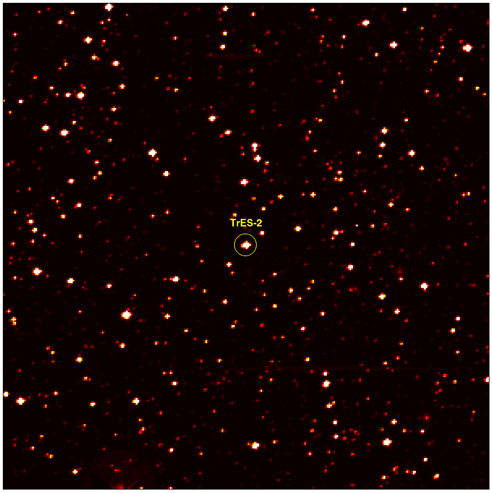
The GSC 03549-02811 system as seen from the Kepler spacecraft. (Celestial north is toward the lower left corner and the subject is in the center of the photograph as seen clearly in the enlarged view.)

The Kepler mission also managed to detect the mass of the planet from Kepler data alone through the analysis of the light curve of the host star. In addition to detecting the planet directly, the planet was also detected by analysis of the star brightness caused by the gravitational tug of TrES-2b by shape distortion of the host star and by light variations due to Doppler beaming.

=== Physical characteristics ===
==== Albedo ====
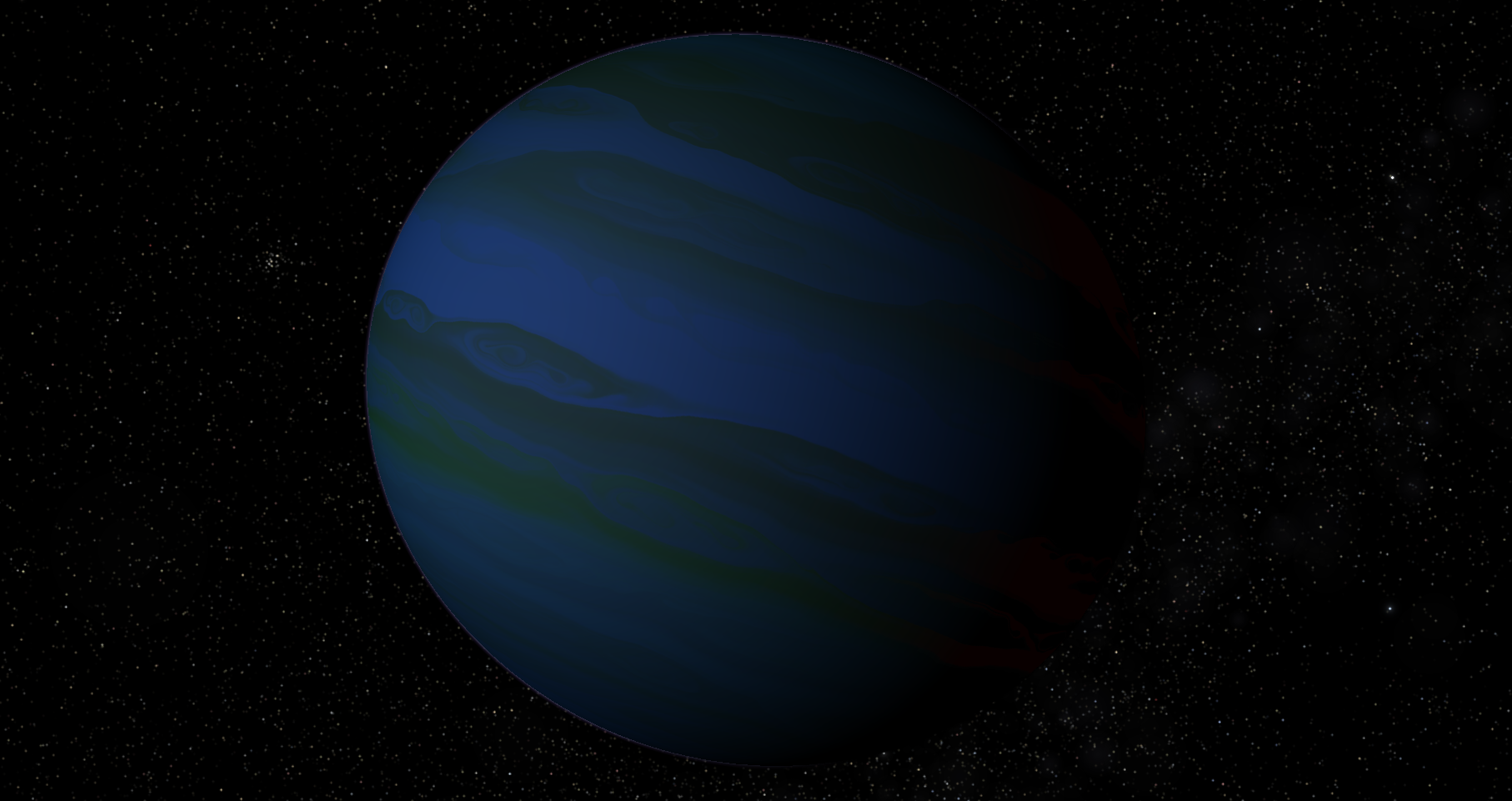
An artist's impression of TrES-2b

The first important result from the Kepler Mission about TrES-2b is an extremely low geometric albedo measured in 2011, making it the intrinsically darkest known exoplanet. If the entire day–night contrast were due to geometric albedo, it would be 2.53%, but modeling suggests that much of this is dayside emission due to the planet's high temperature and the true albedo is much lower. It is estimated to be less than 1%, and for the best-fit model, it is about 0.04%. This makes TrES-2b the darkest known exoplanet, reflecting less of the light that strikes it than coal or black acrylic paint. It is not clear why the planet is so dark. One reason could be the absence of reflective clouds such as those that make Jupiter so bright due to TrES-2b's proximity to its parent star and the consequent high temperature. Another reason could be the presence in the atmosphere of light-absorbing chemicals such as vaporized sodium, potassium, or gaseous titanium oxide; however, Kipping and Spiegel excluded heavy oxides of titanium and vanadium from their models, as it seems unrealistic that condensed, heavy compounds be present in the upper atmosphere. They also note that in general, hot Jupiters are expected to be dark, because "absorption due to the broad wings of the sodium and potassium D lines is thought to dominate their visible spectra", and, apart from that of Kepler-7b (38±12%), albedo measurements for hot Jupiters have generally given only upper limits.

==== Temperature ====
The planet is likely to be tidally locked to the parent star. In 2015, the upper limit of the temperature of the planetary nightside was estimated to be equal to 1885^{+51}_{−66} K. Due to this, it emits a dim reddish glow.

== See also ==
- WASP-12b, another hot Jupiter with a low albedo
- List of largest exoplanets
- List of nearest exoplanets
