= CARMENES survey =

Exoplanet survey

The CARMENES survey (Calar Alto high-Resolution search for M-dwarfs with Exoearths with Near-infrared and optical Échelle Spectrographs) is a project to examine approximately 300 M-dwarf stars for signs of exoplanets with the CARMENES instrument on the Spanish Calar Alto's 3.5m telescope.

Operating since 2016, it aims to find Earth-sized exoplanets around 2 M_{🜨} (Earth masses) using Doppler spectroscopy (also called the radial velocity method). More than 20 exoplanets have been found through CARMENES, among them Teegarden b, considered one of the most potentially habitable exoplanets. Another potentially habitable planet found is Gliese 357 d.

== Discoveries ==
Star	GJ	d [pc]	Sp. type	Planet	P_{orb} [d]	M_{2}sini [M_{⊕}]
LP 729-54	...	22.00	M3.5 V	b	0.768377	2.34 (TESS)
LP 729-54	...	22.00	M3.5 V	c	12.252131	6.29 (TESS)
TOI-1235	...	39.680	M0.5 V	b	3.444717	5.90 (TESS)
CD Ceti	1057	8.069	M5.0 V	b	2.29070	3.95
HD 79211	338 B	6.334	M0.0 V	b	24.45	10.0
TYC 6170-95-1 (EPIC 249893012)	...	325	G8 IV/V	b^{*}	3.5949	8.8 (K2)
TYC 6170-95-1 (EPIC 249893012)	...	325	G8 IV/V	c^{*}	15.624	14.7 (K2)
TYC 6170-95-1 (EPIC 249893012)	...	325	G8 IV/V	d^{*}	35.747	10 (K2)
LP 90-18 (GJ 3512)	3512	9.489	M5.5 V	b	203.59	147
LP 90-18 (GJ 3512)	3512	9.489	M5.5 V	c	>1390	>54
Gliese 357	357	9.444	M2.5 V	b	3.93072	1.84 (TESS)
Gliese 357	357	9.444	M2.5 V	c	9.1247	3.4
Gliese 357	357	9.444	M2.5 V	d	55.661	6.1
LSPM J2116+0234	...	17.639	M3.0 V	b	14.451	13.6
Teegarden's Star	...	3.831	M7.0 V	b	4.9100	1.05
Teegarden's Star	...	3.831	M7.0 V	c	11.409	1.11
BD+61 195	49	9.856	M1.5 V	b	13.851	5.6
K2-285	...	156	K2 V	b^{*}	3.47175	9.7 (K2)
K2-285	...	156	K2 V	c^{*}	7.13804	16 (K2)
K2-285	...	156	K2 V	d^{*}	10.4560	<6.5 (K2)
K2-285	...	156	K2 V	e^{*}	14.7634	<10.7 (K2)
HD 119130	...	114.3	G3 V	b^{*}	16.9841	24
G 232-70	4276	21.35	M4.0 V	b	13.350	15.6
Barnard's Star	699	1.827	M3.5 V	b	232.8	3.2
Ross 1020	3779	13.748	M4.0 V	b	3.0232	8.0
LP 819-052	1265	10.255	M4.5 V	b	3.6511	7.4
HD 180617	752 A	5.912	M2.5 V	b	105.90	12.2
HD 147379	617 A	10.74	M0.0 V	b	86.54	24.7
Ross 1003	1148	11.00	M4.0 V	c	533	68
GX Andromedae	15 A	3.562	M1.0 V	c	7800	50

== See also ==
List of exoplanet search projects
