= LHS 3154 b =

Exoplanet in the constellation Hercules

Discovery
- Discovered by: Mahadevan et al.
- Discovery date: 2023
- Detection method: Radial velocity

Designations
- Alternative names: LP 224-38 b, 2MASS J16063390+4054216 b, TIC 24108819 b, WISEA J160633.13+405423.7 b, LSPM J1606+4054 b

Orbital characteristics
- Semi-major axis: 0.02262±0.00018 AU
- Eccentricity: 0.076+0.057 −0.047
- Orbital period (synodic): 3.71778+0.00080 −0.00081 d
- Argument of perihelion: 82°+102° −47°
- Star: LHS 3154

Physical characteristics
- Mean radius: 3.65 R_{🜨}
- Mass: 13.15+0.84 −0.82 M_{🜨}

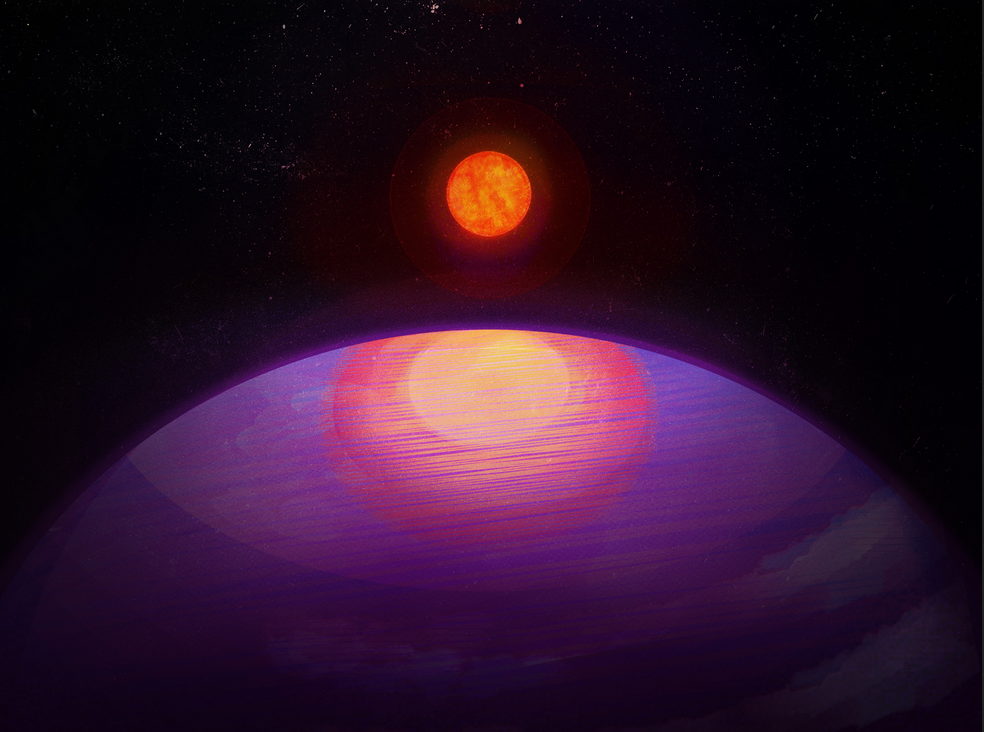
Artist's impression of the probable Neptune-like planet LHS 3154b and its low-mass host star LHS 3154

LHS 3154 b is a Neptune-sized exoplanet orbiting the red dwarf LHS 3154. It is located about 50 light-years from Earth, in the constellation of Hercules. (Note: Constellation obtained with a right ascension of 16^{h} 06^{m} 33.79^{s} and a declination of +40° 54′ 22.0″ on this website.) As it is a massive planet that orbits very close to a low-mass star, it is challenging current models about exoplanet formation, as it would require 10 times more mass than there was in the protoplanetary disk where the planet formed.

== Characteristics ==
LHS 3154 b is a Neptune-like exoplanet with a minimum mass of 13.2 M_{🜨} and an estimated radius of 3.65 R_{🜨}. It orbits its parent star at a distance of 0.02262 astronomical units (3,384,000 km), and completes one revolution every 3 days and 17 hours.

== Importance ==
The discovery of LHS 3154 b raises doubts about the formation of planets, challenging current planetary models, because such a massive planet (13.2 M_{🜨}) was not expected to orbit such a small star, with just a ninth the mass of the Sun, and currently it is the only short-period Neptune-mass planet to orbit a low mass star. Although there are more massive exoplanets orbiting red dwarfs, such as TZ Arietis b and GJ 3512 b, they have wide orbits, with periods longer than 200 days, and likely formed in a different way than LHS 3154 b (core accretion), such as gravitational instability within a massive gaseous outer disk.

One of the ways in which planets form is through core accretion, where they form from initial cores that accrete dust and gas. Planets formed from core accretion orbiting low-mass stars should have a maximum mass of 5 M_{🜨}. LHS 3154 b, however, with a minimum mass of 13 M_{🜨}, presents a challenge to this theory.

Suvrath Mahadevan, one of the planet's discoverers, says: "The planet-forming disk around the low-mass star LHS 3154 is not expected to have enough solid mass to make this planet. But it’s out there, so now we need to reexamine our understanding of how planets and stars form.". According to Guðmundur Stefánsson, another discoverer of the planet, the recent discovery of LHS 3154 b creates doubts about the formation of planets around less massive stars, as it was previously believed that only terrestrial planets could form around these stars.

== Discovery ==
A team of scientists led by Suvrath Mahadevan discovered LHS 3154 b using the Habitable Zone Planet Finder, a spectrograph designed to detect planets orbiting cool stars that might have liquid surface water. The discovery was announced on November 30, 2023, in the journal Science.

== Host star ==
LHS 3154 is a dim red dwarf located at a distance of 15.75 parsecs (51.4 ly) from the Earth in the constellation Hercules. (Note: Constellation obtained with a right ascension of 16^{h} 06^{m} 33.79^{s} and a declination of +40° 54′ 22.0″ on this website.) With an apparent magnitude of 17.5, it cannot be seen with the naked eye or even a small telescope. LHS 3154 has a radius of 0.14 R_{☉} and a mass of 0.11 M_{☉}, which is comparable to the nearby red dwarf Wolf 359.
