= TOI-6894 =

Star in the constellation Leo

Observation data Epoch J2000 Equinox J2000
- Constellation: Leo
- Right ascension: 11^{h} 33^{m} 52.74948^{s}
- Declination: +12° 27′ 30.5817″
- Apparent magnitude (V): 18.22

Characteristics
- Evolutionary stage: Red dwarf
- Spectral type: M5.0±0.5
- Apparent magnitude (J): 13.169±0.023
- Apparent magnitude (H): 12.486±0.022
- Apparent magnitude (K): 12.207±0.021
- Apparent magnitude (TESS): 14.905±0.008

Astrometry
Proper motion (μ)	RA: −146.897 mas/yr Dec.: +22.227 mas/yr
Parallax (π)	13.6842±0.0532 mas
Distance	238.3 ± 0.9 ly (73.1 ± 0.3 pc)

Details
Mass	0.207±0.011 M_{☉}
Radius	0.2276±0.0057 R_{☉}
Luminosity	0.00375±0.00033 L_{☉}
Surface gravity (log g)	5.039±0.011 cgs
Temperature	3,007±58 K
Metallicity [Fe/H]	0.142±0.087 dex

Other designations
- TIC 67512645, 2MASS J11335277+1227034

Database references
SIMBAD	data
Exoplanet Archive	data

TOI-6894 is a star in the constellation Leo. Its apparent magnitude of 18.22 is far below naked eye visibility. Based on parallax measurements, it lies at a distance of 238 light-years (73 parsecs). The star was first catalogued in 2003 by the 2MASS survey, and was analysed by the TESS satellite in search for transiting exoplanets.

This is a red dwarf of spectral class M5.0. It has 0.207 times the Sun's mass, 0.2276 times the Sun's radius, and a mere 0.38% of the solar luminosity. Its effective temperature of 3,000 K give it a typical red hue. The iron-to-hydrogen abundance ratio, a metallicity indicator, is 40% higher than that of the Sun. As of 2025, the discovery of TOI-6894 b makes the star the least massive star known to host a transiting gas planet.

== Planetary system ==
In 2019 Transiting Exoplanet Survey Satellite (TESS) discovered periodic dips on TOI-6894's brightness, which could be a signature of an exoplanet that periodically transits its host star as seen from Earth. Confirmation was made by a team of scientists led by Edward M. Bryant, which used photometry and Doppler spectroscopy to confidently confirm that the dips were caused by an exoplanet. Named TOI-6894 b, where TOI is "TESS Object of Interest", this exoplanet has an orbital period of about 3.37 days and an average separation from its host star of 0.026 astronomical units (3,900,000 km). This somewhat close orbit mean it is receiving 5.5 times the radiation Earth receives from the Sun. The equilibrium temperature is 418 K (145 °C; 293 °F), assuming an albedo of 0.1.

The planet has a large radius of 9.6 Earth radii (R_{🜨}), or about 0.855 R_{J}, contrasting with its small host star. This make planetary transits deep, with 17% of the stellar surface blocked at maximum. Its mass, measured from the gravitational pull it exerts on the star, is 53 times that of Earth (M_{🜨}) (or 0.168 M_{J}), and given the relatively high metallicity of host star, it is estimated that elements heavier than hydrogen and helium, what astronomers term metals, make up 12±2 M_{🜨} (or 22% of the total).

TOI-6894 b is unusual in that it has a relatively high mass while orbiting a low-mass star. Current knowledge predicts that smaller stars, such as TOI-6894, should also have a small amount of material in their protoplanetary disks. It is believed that stars with masses lower than 0.3 M_{☉} should not form gas giants, yet several examples of such planets, as LHS 3154 b, TZ Arietis b and GJ 3512 b have been found, posing challenges to planetary formation theories.

The core accretion model suggest that gas giants form from the accretion of gas around a sufficiently massive core, which forms quickly enough to gain a large amount of gas. In this system, the relatively low amount of solid material in the primordial disk makes the formation of a sufficiently massive core difficult. Another plausible scenario is that TOI-6894 b's massive core accreted heavy elements before accreting gas. The predicted amount of solid material in disks around observed low-mass intermediate-age protostars is still lower than that of the 12 M_{🜨} in TOI-6894 b, but those values are potentially severely underestimated, and the properties of most observed protoplanetary disks are poorly constrained. Additionally, it has been theorized that such massive planets can form during the very early stages of star formation, where the dust amount is high enough, and combined with the rarity of planets like TOI-6894 b, it is still possible that it formed via those pathways.

Alternatively, the planet may have formed in a wider orbit around a disk that was gravitationally unstable and then condensed into a planet. At some point, it migrated to its current position.

TOI-6894 b appears promising for characterization of its atmosphere, which can give further insights to its formation history. Based on the amount of radiation received from its host star, it is expected that the atmosphere is dominated by methane-based chemistry.

The TOI-6894 planetary system
Companion (in order from star)	Mass	Semimajor axis (AU)	Orbital period (days)	Eccentricity	Inclination (°)	Radius
b	0.168±0.022 M_{J}	0.02604±0.00045	3.37077196(59)	0.029±0.030	89.58+0.10 −0.07	0.855±0.022 R_{J}
