= GJ 1002 =

Red dwarf star in the constellation Cetus

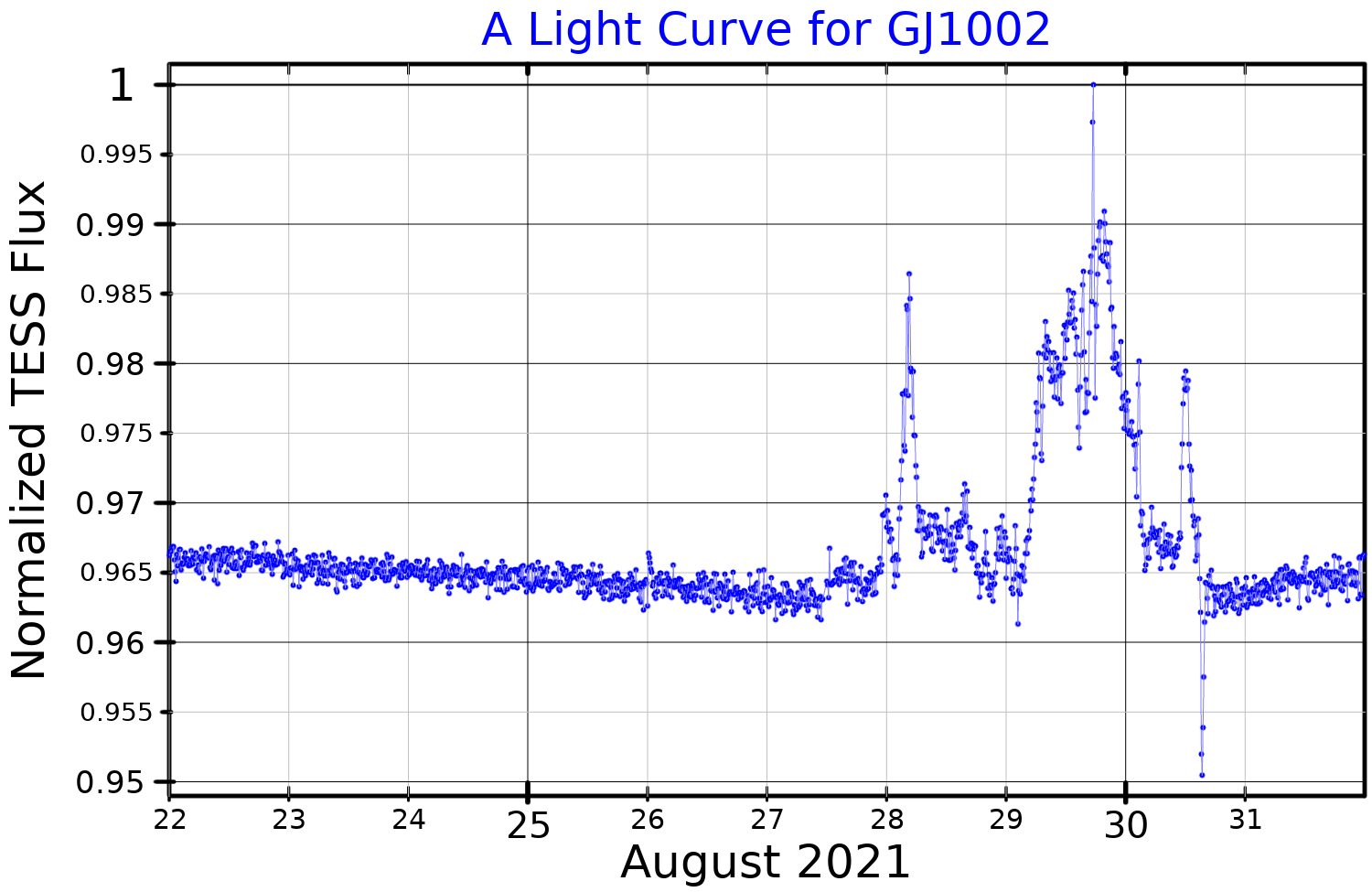
- A light curve for GJ 1002, plotted from TESS data

Observation data Epoch J2000 Equinox ICRS
- Constellation: Cetus
- Right ascension: 00^{h} 06^{m} 43.19732^{s}
- Declination: −07° 32′ 17.0191″
- Apparent magnitude (V): 13.837±0.003

Characteristics
- Evolutionary stage: Main sequence
- Spectral type: M5.5V
- Apparent magnitude (V): 13.837±0.003
- Apparent magnitude (G): 11.774±0.003
- Apparent magnitude (J): 8.323±0.019
- Apparent magnitude (H): 7.792±0.034
- Apparent magnitude (K): 7.439±0.021

Astrometry
| Radial velocity (R_{v}) | −40.46±0.30 km/s |
| Proper motion (μ) | RA: −811.566 mas/yr Dec.: −1893.251 mas/yr |
| Parallax (π) | 206.3500±0.0474 mas |
| Distance | 15.806 ± 0.004 ly (4.846 ± 0.001 pc) |

Details
| Mass | 0.120±0.010 M_{☉} |
| Radius | 0.137±0.005 R_{☉} |
| Luminosity (bolometric) | 0.001406±0.000019 L_{☉} |
| Surface gravity (log g) | 5.10±0.06 cgs |
| Temperature | 3024±52 K |
| Metallicity [Fe/H] | −0.25±0.19 dex |
| Rotation | 161.28±2.93 days |

Other designations
- NSV 15022, GJ 1002, G 158-27, LHS 2, NLTT 248, PLX 9.01, PM 00042-0747, TIC 176287658, 2MASS J00064325-0732147

Database references
| SIMBAD | data |
| Exoplanet Archive | data |
| ARICNS | data |

GJ 1002, or LHS 2, is a nearby red dwarf star, located 15.8 light-years (4.8 parsecs) away from the Solar System in the constellation of Cetus. At an apparent magnitude of 13.8, it is much too faint to be visible to the naked eye. It hosts a system of two known exoplanets.

With a spectral type of M5.5V, this star is a red dwarf similar to Proxima Centauri. It has 12% the mass and 14% the radius of the Sun, and a temperature of 3,024 K (2,751 °C; 4,984 °F). It is a slowly rotating star with a low level of magnetic activity. Prior to the discovery of planets, it was an object of interest for the study of molecular features in its spectrum.

== Planetary system ==
Two planetary companions to GJ 1002 were discovered in 2022 via radial velocity. Both have minimum masses close to that of Earth and orbit within the habitable zone of their star. While these planets do not transit their host star, it may be possible to determine the presence and composition of atmospheres with future instruments such as the ANDES spectrograph for the Extremely Large Telescope.

As of 2023, GJ 1002 b & c are the fourth- and fifth-closest known Earth-mass exoplanets within the conservatively defined habitable zone, after Proxima Centauri b, GJ 1061 d, and Teegarden's Star c, and followed by Wolf 1069 b.

The GJ 1002 planetary system
| Companion (in order from star) | Mass | Semimajor axis (AU) | Orbital period (days) | Eccentricity | Inclination (°) | Radius |
|---|---|---|---|---|---|---|
| b | ≥1.08±0.13 M_{🜨} | 0.0457±0.0013 | 10.3465±0.027 | — | — | — |
| c | ≥1.36±0.17 M_{🜨} | 0.0738±0.0021 | 21.202±0.013 | — | — | — |

== See also ==
- Ross 128
- GJ 1061
- Teegarden's Star
