= Teegarden's Star b =

Goldilocks terrestrial exoplanet orbiting Teegarden's Star

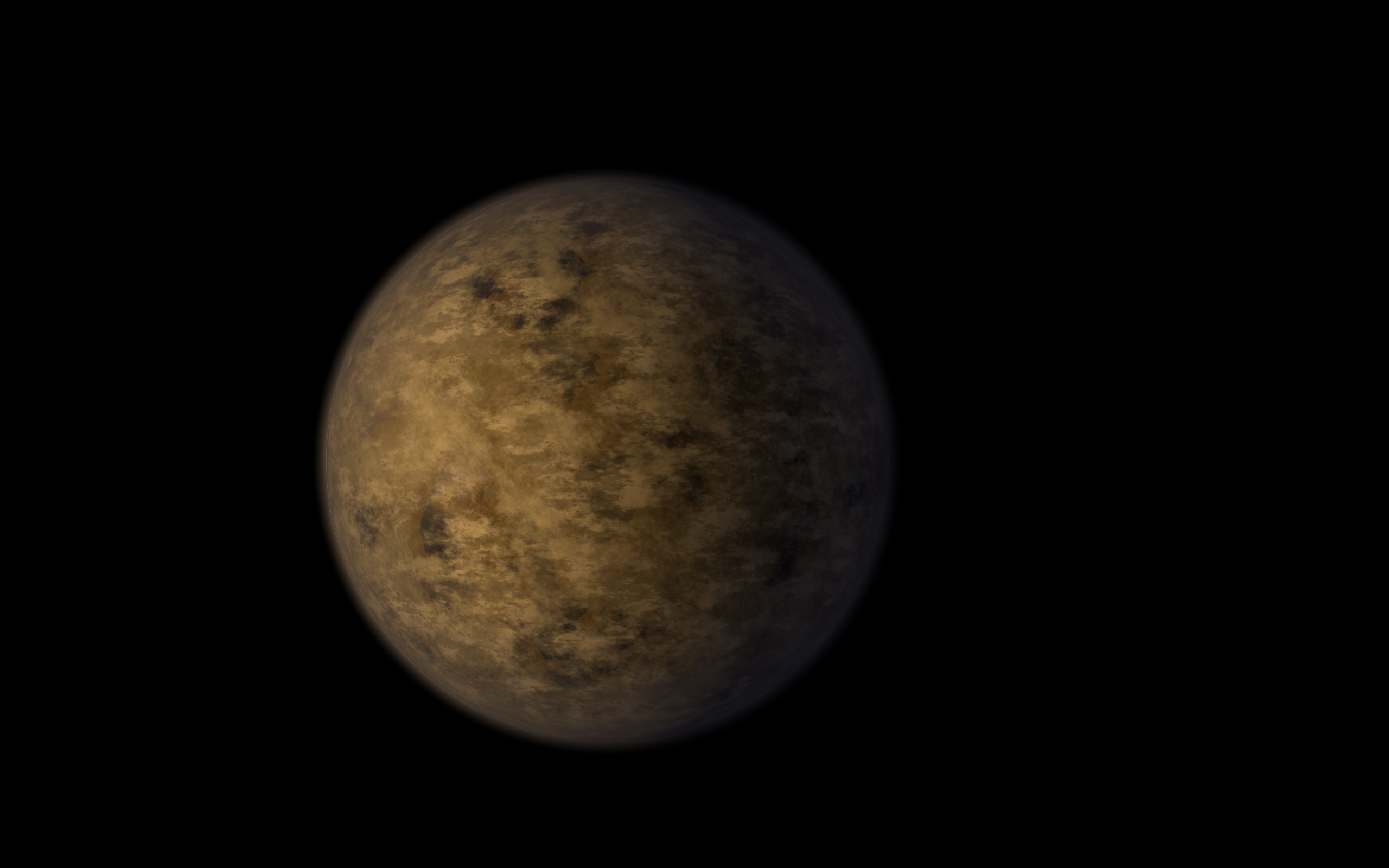
- Artist's impression of Teegarden's Star b

Discovery
- Discovered by: Zechmeister et al.
- Discovery site: Calar Alto Observatory
- Discovery date: June 2019

Orbital characteristics
- Semi-major axis: 0.0252+0.0008 −0.0009 AU
- Eccentricity: 0+0.16 −0
- Orbital period (sidereal): 4.91±0.0014 d
- Star: Teegarden's Star

Physical characteristics
- Mass: ≥ 1.05+0.13 −0.12 M_{🜨}
- Temperature: 301 K (28 °C)

Teegarden's Star b (also known as Teegarden b) is an exoplanet found orbiting within the habitable zone of Teegarden's Star, an M-type red dwarf 12.5 light-years away from the Solar System. It had the highest Earth Similarity Index (ESI) of any exoplanet, but in February 2024 a new study updated the parameters of the planet, thus reducing its ESI to 0.90, making it no longer the planet with the hightest ESI. Along with Teegarden's Star c, it is among the closest-known potentially habitable exoplanets.

== Discovery ==
In July (2019), a team of more than 155 scientists led by Mathias Zechmeister published a peer-reviewed article in Astronomy & Astrophysics as part of the CARMENES survey supporting the existence of two candidate exoplanets orbiting Teegarden's Star.

Because of the alignment and faintness of Teegarden's Star, Doppler spectroscopy (also known as the radial velocity method) was necessary to detect possible exoplanets. This method detects exoplanets indirectly by observing their effects on a host star's radial velocity, the speed at which it is moving towards or away from the Earth. These radial velocity anomalies in turn produce doppler shifts observable with a spectrograph-equipped telescope of sufficient power.

To accomplish this, the team used the CARMENES instrument on the 3.5-metre (11 ft) telescope of Spain's Calar Alto Observatory. After three years of observation, (Note: "Moreover, we have shown that the 4.9 d signal is stable over the three years of observations in period and amplitude.") two periodic radial velocity signals emerged: one at 4.91 d (Teegarden's Star b) and another at 11.41 d (Teegarden's Star c).

== Physical characteristics ==
=== Mass and orbit ===
Teegarden's Star b is the innermost-known planet orbiting Teegarden's Star, with an orbital period of just 4.91 d. The planet's minimum mass is 1.05 M_{🜨}; this value would be the true mass if the planet's orbit is not inclined from the Earth's perspective. Because of this, Teegarden's Star b is likely to be rocky. Astronomers estimate that Teegarden's Star b has a 60 percent chance of having liquid water, but an extremely low chance (3%) of having an atmosphere.

== Host star ==
Teegarden's Star is a low-mass red dwarf, with a mass of around 9 percent the mass of the Sun, and with a temperature of around 2,900 K (2,630 °C; 4,760 °F). Due to the very low temperature and luminosity of Teegarden's Star, it was only discovered in 2003, since it has an apparent magnitude of only 15.1 (and an absolute magnitude of 17.22). Like most red and brown dwarfs, it emits most of its energy in the infrared spectrum. It is also older than the Sun, with an age of at least 8 billion years.

== Habitability ==
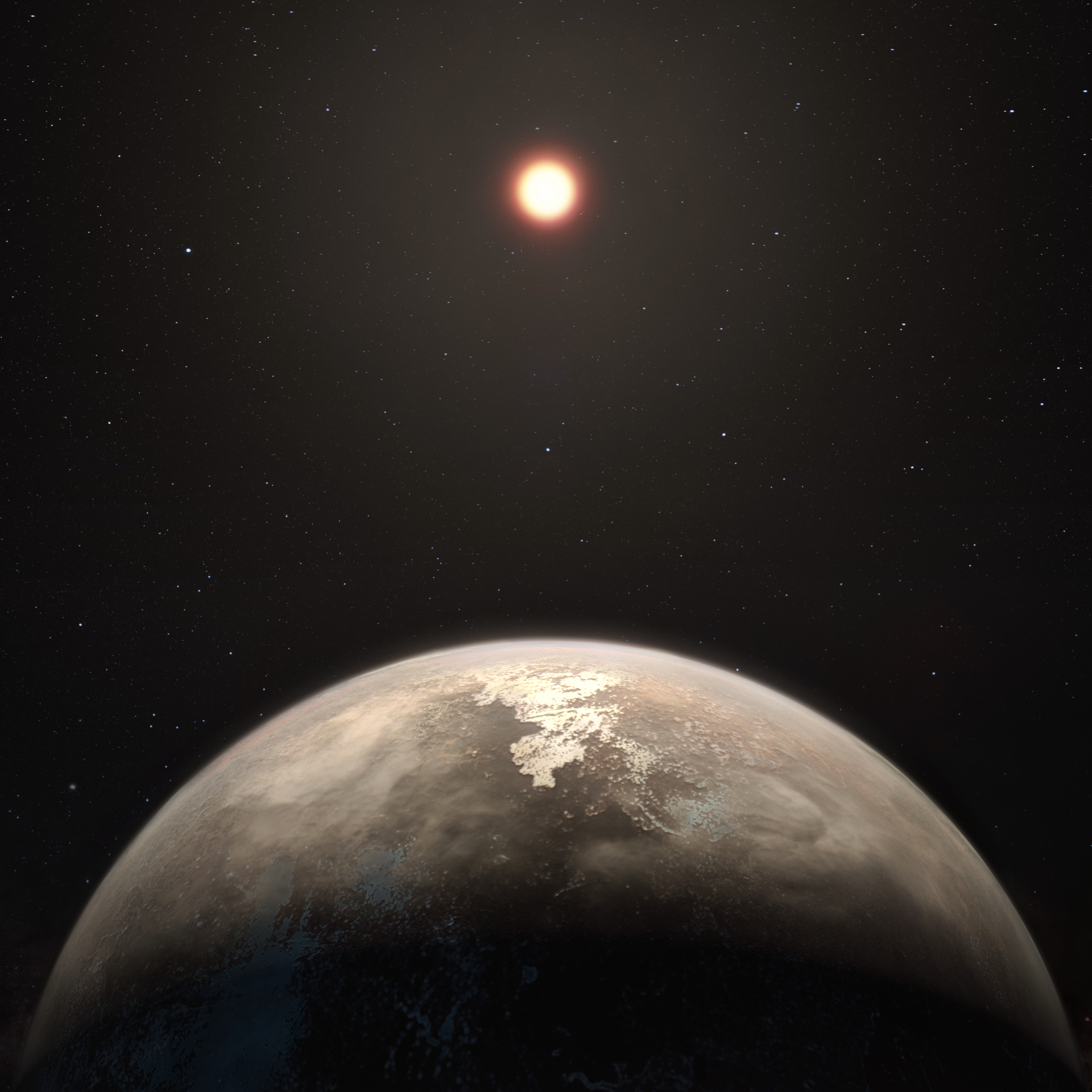
Ross 128, an example of a quiet red dwarf that can support a habitable planet, like Teegarden's Star

Teegarden's Star b orbits within the habitable zone of its host star, meaning it is possible that its atmospheric composition could allow for stable liquid water on its surface, which could have also allowed the development of life. Though due to the star being a red dwarf, Teegarden B orbits extremely close to be in the habitable zone, which means the planet is likely tidally locked due to tidal forces.

== See also ==
- List of nearest exoplanets
- List of potentially habitable exoplanets
