= Alexandra Oliva =

American writer

Alexandra Oliva is an American writer of speculative fiction.

== Biography ==
Oliva grew up in the Adirondack Mountains. She graduated from Yale University with a BA in history and from The New School with an MFA in creative writing.

Her first published novel, The Last One, takes place in a post-apocalyptic setting and features a protagonist who is starring in a reality television program. It was selected as a "Best Book of 2016" by the Seattle Times. Her third novel, The Radiant Dark, is set in an alternate timeline where an extraterrestrial species from the expolanet Ross 128 b contacts Earth in the 1980s. The New York Times described it as a "slow burn" and praised Oliva's "skillful character development".

== Works ==
- — (2016). The Last One. Ballantine Books. ISBN 978-1-101-96508-5.
- — (2021). Forget Me Not. Ballantine Books. ISBN 978-1-101-96685-3.
- — (2026). The Radiant Dark. SJP Lit. ISBN 978-1-63893-252-9.
