= Sara Shane =

American actress (1928–2022)

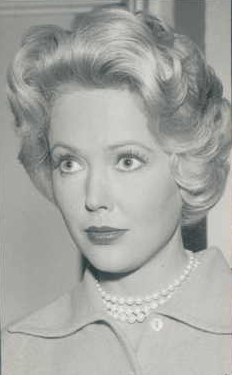
- Shane in Perry Mason (1961)
- Born: Elaine Sterling; May 18, 1928; St. Louis, Missouri, U.S.
- Died: July 31, 2022 (aged 94); Gold Coast, Australia
- Occupations: Actress; author
- Years active: 1948–1964
- Spouse(s): William I. Hollingsworth, Jr. (m. 1949; div. 1957)
- Children: James (b. 1951)

Sara Shane, born Elaine Sterling, (May 18, 1928 – July 31, 2022) was an American actress, who starred in film and television during the Golden Age Era in the 1950s and early 1960s.

== Acting career ==
Born Elaine Sterling, Shane secured a film contract with MGM and was featured in a few musicals (billed with her birth name). She "was dropped by the studio after six months." In 1953 she hired publicist Russell Birdwell, and began using the name Sara Shane ("inspired by the movie with the same name"). She secured a seven-year contract with Universal International pictures (UI), but after two films took a sabbatical, which at the time was predicted as likely being brief.

A 1953 newspaper article reported that fellow actress Hedy Lamarr prompted Shane (described as Lamarr's "closest woman friend in recent years") to resume her career in film. Shane said of Lamarr, "She pushed me into a career again and got me out of my laziness." The article noted that Shane was "currently testing for the John Wayne picture, 'The High and the Mighty,' and the film version of 'Oklahoma.'" She returned to film and television work in 1955, most notably in the Clark Gable film The King and Four Queens. Her last film, 1959’s Tarzan's Greatest Adventure, in which she portrayed Angie, is considered her most memorable performance. She continued in television through 1964.

Among Shane's television appearances, she played the role of defendant Alyce Aitken in the 1961 Perry Mason episode, "The Case of the Envious Editor." She also played the role of Ethel Meridith in The Outer Limits TV series, Episode 8, Season 2, titled "Wolf 359" which aired on November 7, 1964. Shane's final acting role was as the Countess in the first-season, Christmas-themed episode "Long Live the King" of the ABC television series Voyage to the Bottom of the Sea which aired on December 21, 1964. The episode's director László Benedek had previously worked with Shane on The Outer Limits episode "Wolf 359 and recommended her for the role.

== Business ventures ==
Shane left acting in 1964 to go into business. As of 2018, she was a director of Hippocrates Health Centre in Queensland, Australia and an author. In 1974, she published a non-fiction novel, Zulma, about a Mexican pre-op trans woman's experiences in the La Mesa Prison, based on her visit to the prison and her meeting with a trans woman named Zulma. In 2000, she published Take Control of Your Health and Escape the Sickness Industry (ISBN 978-0646402970). In 2008 she wrote, produced, and co-presented (with narrator Tony Barry) a DVD documentary entitled "One Answer to Cancer" (2008). The first half of the DVD is about the dangers of the pharmaceutical drug Aldara. The rest of the movie promotes the alternative cancer treatment, black salve; including detailed instructions on how to make it and apply it yourself.

== Personal life ==
Shane married William Hollingsworth, a "wealthy real estate tycoon," in 1949. They divorced in 1957. The couple had a son, Jamie. Shane died on July 31, 2022, at the age of 94 in Gold Coast, Australia.

== Filmography ==
Year	Title	Role	Notes
1948	Easter Parade	Showgirl	Uncredited
1948	Julia Misbehaves	Mannequin	Uncredited
1949	Neptune's Daughter	Miss Pratt	Uncredited
1954	Magnificent Obsession	Valerie	
1954	Sign of the Pagan	Myra	
1955	Daddy Long Legs	Pat	Uncredited
1956	Three Bad Sisters	Lorna Craig	
1956	The King and Four Queens	Oralie McDade	
1957	Affair in Havana	Lorna	
1959	Tarzan's Greatest Adventure	Angie Loring	

== Television ==
Year	Title	Role	Notes
1961	Alfred Hitchcock Presents	Loretta Burns	Season 7 Episode 8: “The Old Pro”
1961	Perry Mason	Alyce Aitken	Season 4 Episode 13: "The Case of the Envious Editor”
1962	The Alfred Hitchcock Hour	Helen Barrow	Season 1 Episode 5: "Captive Audience"
1964	The Outer Limits	Ethel Meridith	Season 2 Episode 8: "Wolf 359"
1964	Voyage to the Bottom of the Sea	The Countess	Season 1 Episode 15: "Long Live the King"
