= Wolf 359 (The Outer Limits) =

- The Outer Limits episode
- Episode no.: Season 2 Episode 8
- Directed by: Laslo Benedek
- Story by: Seeleg Lester; Richard Landau
- Teleplay by: Seeleg Lester
- Cinematography by: Kenneth Peach
- Production code: 38
- Original air date: November 7, 1964

Guest appearances
- Patrick O'Neal; Sara Shane

Episode chronology
← Previous "The Invisible Enemy"	Next → "I, Robot"

"Wolf 359" is an episode of the original The Outer Limits television show. It first aired on November 7, 1964, during the second season. The title is derived from a star of the same name located relatively near Earth.

The episode is well known for the following quote:

There is a theory that Earth and sun and galaxy and all the known universes are only a dust mote on some policeman's uniform in some gigantic super-world. Couldn't we be under some super-microscope, right now?

== Summary ==
The speedy evolution of an alien culture is observed through a professor's telescope. However, the experience soon goes out of control when a malevolent lifeform evolves at the planet's surface and threatens the scientific team.

=== Opening narration ===
Outward stretches the quest for truth. Stars without end. Timeless infinities. A billion, billion galaxies. Man's imagination reaches out and out, while betimes the farthest reaches of knowledge are found in the smallest places...

=== Main plot ===
Working on behalf of corporate interests, scientist Jonathan Meredith has created a miniature version of a remote planet (in the titular Wolf 359 system) in his laboratory. Due to the miniaturization, this artificial world knows an accelerated development, thus allowing Meredith to study its evolution through an electronic microscope, and to observe the birth of archaic life forms on its surface. However, soon a mysterious lifeform evolves along with the developing experiment. It is aware of the scientist's presence—even acting aggressively toward him at some point. Manifesting by night in the absence of light, the creature takes a physical shape into the laboratory itself, destroying all life inside it, including plants, a colony of ants and a couple of guinea pigs.

Becoming aware of the situation, Meredith weighs the value of his experiment versus the possible dangers. He resorts to firing his lab assistant and sending his wife back home in order to keep them away from harm. Pursuing his studies, the scientist discovers the creature inhabiting the planet seems to be a manifestation of the planet itself, similar to its collective mind, and bent on destruction. As the evolution of the miniature world progresses, Meredith observes a reproduction of the darkest moments of Earth's history at its surface (including the development of nuclear weapons).

Lowering his guard one night, Meredith is suddenly attacked by the creature. He is saved by his wife, who returns at the right moment to break open the miniature planet's containment cell. The cell's atmosphere escapes and the creature is destroyed along with the planet. In the epilogue, Meredith can be seen recording his final report on Wolf 359, saying that the experiment is over and the planet destroyed. Yet he also mentions that the experience could be successfully recreated in the future, if only one could find a better planet.

=== Closing narration ===
There is a theory that Earth and sun and galaxy and all the known universes are only a dust mote on some policeman's uniform in some gigantic superworld. Couldn't we be under some supermicroscope, right now?

== Cast ==
The main cast for the episode is as follows:

- Patrick O'Neal – as Jonathan Meredith
- Sara Shane – as Ethel Meredith
- Peter Haskell – as Peter Jellicoe
- Ben Wright – as Philip Exeter Dundee
- Dabney Coleman – as James Custer
