= Teegarden's Star =

Red dwarf star in the constellation Aries

- Location of Teegarden's Star in the constellation Aries

Observation data Epoch J2000 Equinox ICRS
- Constellation: Aries
- Right ascension: 02^{h} 53^{m} 00.89179^{s}
- Declination: +16° 52′ 52.6322″
- Apparent magnitude (V): 15.13

Characteristics
- Spectral type: M7.0 V
- Apparent magnitude (B): ~17.21
- Apparent magnitude (V): ~15.40
- Apparent magnitude (R): ~14.1
- Apparent magnitude (I): ~10.4
- Apparent magnitude (J): 8.394 ± 0.027
- Apparent magnitude (H): 7.883 ± 0.040
- Apparent magnitude (K): 7.585 ± 0.046

Astrometry
Radial velocity (R_{v})	68.3 km/s
Proper motion (μ)	RA: +3,429.083 mas/yr Dec.: −3,805.541 mas/yr
Parallax (π)	260.9884±0.0934 mas
Distance	12.497 ± 0.004 ly (3.832 ± 0.001 pc)
Absolute magnitude (M_{V})	17.22

Details
Mass	0.097±0.010 M_{☉}
Radius	0.120±0.012 R_{☉}
Luminosity	0.000722±0.000005 L_{☉}
Surface gravity (log g)	5.19±0.2 cgs
Temperature	3,034±45 K
Metallicity [Fe/H]	−0.11±0.28 dex
Rotation	98.05±1.30 days
Rotational velocity (v sin i)	<2 km/s
Age	>8 Gyr

Other designations
- Teegarden's Star, GJ 10393, 2MASS J02530084+1652532, APM EO0425-0315372, FBS L 14-17, FBS 0250+167, GAT 1370, LSPM J0253+1652, SO J025300.5+165258, USNO-A2.0 1050-00774305, USNO-B1.0 1068-00028941

Database references
SIMBAD	data
Exoplanet Archive	data

Teegarden's Star /ˈtiːɡɑːrdənz/ (SO J025300.5+165258, 2MASS J02530084+1652532, LSPM J0253+1652) is a red dwarf star in the constellation Aries, 12.5 light-years (3.8 parsecs) from the Solar System. Although it is near-Earth it is a dim magnitude 15 and can only be seen through large telescopes. This star was found to have a very large proper motion of about 5 arcseconds per year. Only seven stars with such large proper motions are currently known. Teegarden's Star hosts a planetary system with at least three planets.

== Discovery ==
Teegarden's star showing proper motion at two year intervals

Teegarden's Star was discovered in 2003 using asteroid-tracking data that had been collected years earlier. This data set is a digital archive created from optical images taken over a five-year period by the Near-Earth Asteroid Tracking (NEAT) program using two 1 m telescopes on Maui, Hawaii. The star is named after the discovery team leader, Bonnard J. Teegarden, an astrophysicist at NASA's Goddard Space Flight Center.

Astronomers have long thought it was quite likely that many undiscovered dwarf stars exist within 20 light-years of Earth, because stellar-population surveys show the count of known nearby dwarf stars to be lower than otherwise expected and these stars are dim and easily overlooked. Teegarden's team thought that these dim stars might be found by data mining some of the huge optical sky survey data sets taken by various programs for other purposes in previous years. So they reexamined the NEAT asteroid tracking data set and found this star. The star was then precovered on photographic plates from the Palomar Sky Survey taken in 1951. This discovery is significant as the team did not have direct access to any telescopes and did not include professional astronomers at the time of the discovery.

== Properties ==
Teegarden's Star (top, center) is the 25th-nearest known star (system) to the Solar System.

Teegarden's Star is classified as a red dwarf as its approximate calculated mass of just over 0.09 times that of the Sun is narrowly above the limit of brown dwarfs. The inherently low temperature of such objects explains why it was not discovered earlier, since it has an apparent magnitude of only 15.1 (and an absolute magnitude of 17.22). Like most red and brown dwarfs it emits most of its energy in the infrared spectrum.

The parallax was initially measured as 0.43 ± 0.13 arcseconds. This would have placed its distance at only 7.50 light-years, making Teegarden's Star only the third star system in order of distance from the Sun, ranking between Barnard's Star and Wolf 359. However, even at that time the anomalously low luminosity (the absolute magnitude would have been 18.5) and high uncertainty in the parallax suggested that it was in fact somewhat farther away, still one of the Sun's nearest neighbors but not nearly as high in the ranking in order of distance. A more accurate parallax measurement of 0.2593 arcseconds was made by George Gatewood in 2009, yielding a distance of 12.578 light-years, very close to the value now accepted.

Teegarden's Star is inactive compared to stars of similar spectrum and mass. It still shows some stellar flares with strengths comparable to the largest solar flares. Two of these flares were observed by a study, and one of them shows clear signatures of the Neupert effect.

== Planetary system ==
Observations by the ROPS survey in 2010, published in 2012, showed variation in the radial velocity of Teegarden's Star, though there was insufficient data to make claims of planet detection at that time.

In June 2019, scientists conducting the CARMENES survey at the Calar Alto Observatory announced evidence of two Earth-mass exoplanets orbiting the star within its habitable zone; Teegarden's Star b orbits inside the optimistic habitable zone—the equivalent in the Solar System would be in between Earth and Venus—whereas Teegarden's Star c orbits on the outer edge of the conservative habitable zone, similarly to Mars.

A 2024 study detected a third planet orbiting farther out, with a period of 26 days and a minimum mass slightly less than Earth's mass. This third planet, Teegarden's Star d, orbits beyond the habitable zone and would have temperatures similar to the icy moons of Jupiter. Two longer-period radial velocity signals were also detected; a 96-day signal corresponds to the star's rotation, while the origin of a 172-day signal is uncertain.

According to one group of researchers, who were specifically studying this star, both habitable-zone planets could have maintained a dense atmosphere and so therefore there would be a high likelihood that at least one may harbour liquid water. However, another group of scientists, looking at Earth-sized planets in general in the habitable zones of stars, specifically in a likely tidally locked scenario, give Teegarden's Star b a 3% chance, and Teegarden's Star c only a 2% chance, of having even retained an atmosphere.

Teegarden's Star b, c and d receive more X-ray radiation than Earth does, but if they have certain atmospheric compositions, as an Earth-like atmosphere, the effects on the ground would still be negligible.

While TESS observations confirm that the planets of Teegarden's Star do not transit their star as seen from Earth, from 2044 to 2496 Earth would transit the Sun as seen from Teegarden's Star.

The Teegarden's Star planetary system
Companion (in order from star)	Mass	Semimajor axis (AU)	Orbital period (days)	Eccentricity	Inclination (°)	Radius
b	≥1.16+0.12 −0.11 M_{🜨}	0.0259+0.0008 −0.0009	4.90634±0.00041	0.03+0.04 −0.02	—	—
c	≥1.05+0.14 −0.13 M_{🜨}	0.0455+0.0015 −0.0016	11.416±0.003	0.04+0.07 −0.03	—	—
d	≥0.82±0.17 M_{🜨}	0.0791+0.0025 −0.0027	26.13+0.03 −0.04	0.07+0.10 −0.05	—	—

== See also ==
- GJ 1002 – Red dwarf star in the constellation Cetus
- GJ 1061 – Red dwarf star in the constellation Horologium
- List of nearest stars and brown dwarfs
- Stars named after people
