= Teegarden's Star c =

Terrestrial exoplanet orbiting Teegarden's Star

Discovery
- Discovered by: Zechmeister et al.
- Discovery site: Calar Alto Observatory
- Discovery date: June 2019
- Detection method: Doppler spectroscopy

Orbital characteristics
- Semi-major axis: 0.0443+0.0014 −0.0015 AU
- Eccentricity: 0+0.16 −0
- Orbital period (sidereal): 11.4±0.0014 days

Physical characteristics
- Mass: ≥ 1.11+0.16 −0.15 M_{🜨}
- Temperature: 226 K (−47 °C)

Teegarden's Star c (also known as Teegarden c) is an exoplanet found orbiting in the habitable zone of Teegarden's Star, an M-type red dwarf star 12.5 light-years away from the Solar System. It orbits in the conservative habitable zone around its star. Along with Teegarden's Star b, it is among the closest-known potentially habitable exoplanets. It was discovered in June 2019.

== Characteristics ==
Teegarden's Star c has an orbital period of 11.4 days. The minimum mass of the planet is one Earth mass, and its radius is probably Earth-like, suggesting an Earth-like composition, with an iron core and rocky crust. Teegarden's Star c could potentially have an ocean of water on its surface, or ice because of temperatures.

== Habitability ==
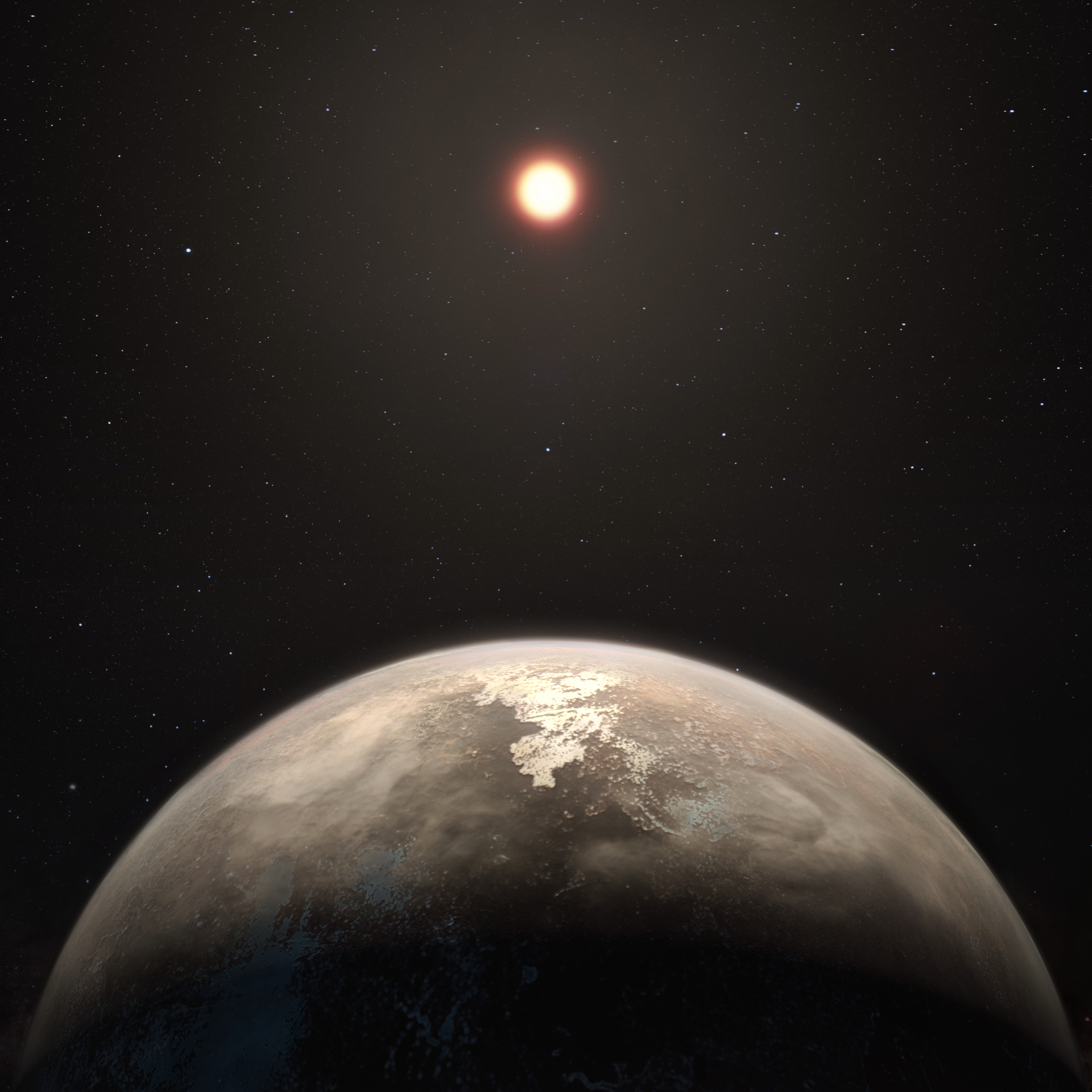
Ross 128, an example of quiet red dwarf that can support habitable planets, like Teegarden's Star

Teegarden c orbits in the conservative habitable zone. The equilibrium temperature for the planet is −47 °C (−53 °F), but if the planet has a thick atmosphere, its surface could be much warmer. Earth's equilibrium temperature is −18 °C (0 °F), but our atmosphere maintains temperatures well above that.

One positive factor for habitability is its star. Most red dwarfs emit strong flares, which can strip the atmosphere and eliminate habitability. A good example is Kepler-438b, which is likely uninhabitable because its sun is an active star. Another example is Proxima Centauri, the closest star to the Sun. Teegarden's Star is inactive and quiet, making the planet possibly habitable. Other quiet red dwarfs with potentially habitable exoplanets are Ross 128 and Luyten's Star.

== Host star ==
Teegarden's Star is an ultra-cool red dwarf at around 9 percent the mass of the Sun with a temperature of around 2,900 K (2,630 °C; 4,760 °F). The inherent low temperatures of such objects explain why it was not discovered earlier, since it has an apparent magnitude of only 15.1 (and an absolute magnitude of 17.22). Like most red and brown dwarfs it emits most of its energy in the infrared spectrum. It is older than the Sun, with an age of 8 billion years.

It was discovered in 2003. Astronomers have long thought it was quite likely that many undiscovered dwarf stars exist within 20 light-years of Earth, because stellar-population surveys show the count of known nearby dwarf stars to be lower than otherwise expected and these stars are dim and easily overlooked. Teegarden's team thought that these dim stars might be found by data mining some of the huge optical sky survey data sets taken by various programs for other purposes in previous years. They reexamined the NEAT asteroid tracking data set and found this star. The star was then located on photographic plates from the Palomar Sky Survey taken in 1951. This discovery is significant as the team did not have direct access to any telescopes and did not include professional astronomers at the time of the discovery.

The parallax was initially measured as 0.43″±0.13″. This would have placed its distance at only 7.50 light-years, making Teegarden's Star only the third star system in order of distance from the Sun, ranking between Barnard's Star and Wolf 359. However, even at that time the anomalous low luminosity (the absolute magnitude would have been 18.5) and high uncertainty in the parallax suggested that it was in fact somewhat farther away, still one of the Sun's nearest neighbors but not nearly as high in the ranking in order of distance. A more accurate parallax measurement of 0.2593 arcseconds was made by George Gatewood in 2009, yielding the now-accepted distance of 12.578 light-years.
