= HD 147379 =

Visual binary in constellation Draco

- Location of HD 147379 (circled)

Observation data Epoch J2000 Equinox ICRS
- Constellation: Draco
- HD 147379A
- Right ascension: 16^{h} 16^{m} 42.74635^{s}
- Declination: +67° 14′ 19.8316″
- Apparent magnitude (V): 8.9
- HD 147379B
- Right ascension: 16^{h} 16^{m} 45.31448^{s}
- Declination: +67° 15′ 22.4811″
- Apparent magnitude (V): 10.69-10.74

Characteristics

HD 147379A
- Evolutionary stage: main sequence
- Spectral type: M0.0V
- B−V color index: 1.11
- J−H color index: 0.643
- J−K color index: 0.826

HD 147379B
- Spectral type: M3V
- J−H color index: 0.608
- J−K color index: 0.842
- Variable type: BY Draconis variable

Astrometry

HD 147379A
Radial velocity (R_{v})	−18.962±0.0011 km/s
Proper motion (μ)	RA: −497.915 mas/yr Dec.: 84.047 mas/yr
Parallax (π)	92.8766±0.0146 mas
Distance	35.117 ± 0.006 ly (10.767 ± 0.002 pc)
Absolute magnitude (M_{V})	+8.47

HD 147379B
Radial velocity (R_{v})	−18.36±0.0008 km/s
Proper motion (μ)	RA: −483.006 mas/yr Dec.: 89.049 mas/yr
Parallax (π)	92.8985±0.0160 mas
Distance	35.109 ± 0.006 ly (10.764 ± 0.002 pc)
Absolute magnitude (M_{V})	+10.54

Orbit
Primary	HD 147379A
Secondary	HD 147379B
Semi-major axis (a)	64.4" (693.4 AU)

Details

HD 147379A
Mass	0.58±0.08 M_{☉}
Radius	0.57±0.06 R_{☉}
Luminosity	0.1069±0.0153 L_{☉}
Surface gravity (log g)	4.609±0.012 cgs
Temperature	4090±50 K
Metallicity [Fe/H]	0.16±0.16 dex
Rotation	22 d
Age	5.1+3.2 −2.4 Gyr

HD 147379B
Mass	0.45±0.02 M_{☉}
Radius	0.460±0.008 R_{☉}
Luminosity	0.02645±0.00645 L_{☉}
Surface gravity (log g)	4.84±0.06 cgs
Temperature	3525±31 K
Metallicity [Fe/H]	0.20±0.10 dex
Rotation	40.4±3.0 d
Rotational velocity (v sin i)	0.50 km/s

Other designations
- GJ 617, HD 147379, WDS J16167+6714
- HD 147379A: AG+67°695, BD+67°935, GC 21949, HIP 79755, G 257-32, G 225-57, G 240-14, LHS 3175, LSPM J1616+6714, LTT 14863, NLTT 42488, TIC 230073581, TYC 4195-721-1, 2MASS J16164280+6714196, WISEA J161641.85+671420.6, Gaia DR3 1642641410934267008
- HD 147379B: EW Draconis, HIP 79762, SAO 17026, PPM 19804, G 240-15, G 225-58, G 257-33, LHS 3176, LSPM J1616+6715, LTT 14864, NLTT 42489, TIC 230073588, TYC 4195-1167-1, GSC 04195-01167, 2MASS J16164537+6715224, WISEA J161644.44+671523.3, Gaia DR3 1642642957122493824

Database references
SIMBAD	A
- B

HD 147379 (Gliese 617) is a wide visual binary between two red dwarfs in the deep northern constellation of Draco. The two stars are located approximately 35.1 light-years (10.8 pc) distant based on Gaia DR3 parallax measurements, and approaching the Solar System at heliocentric radial velocities of −18.962 km/s and −18.36 km/s, respectively. The brighter primary star, HD 147379A, has an apparent magnitude of 8.9, too faint to be seen by the naked eye from Earth but visible using binoculars. The dimmer secondary, B, fluctuates in apparent magnitude between 10.69 and 10.74, making it observable via a telescope with an aperture of 35 mm or larger.

== HD 147379A ==
HD 147379A (HIP 79755) is a red dwarf with a spectral type of M0.0V, about 58% the mass of the Sun, 57% the radius, and an age of 5.1+3.2
−2.4 billion years. It emits just over a tenth of the luminosity of the Sun from its photosphere at an effective temperature of 4,090 K (3,820 °C; 6,900 °F). It has a high metallicity of [Fe/H]=0.16±0.16 dex, meaning it has an iron content somewhere around 45% higher than the Sun. It is also enriched in cobalt, but is depleted in calcium and titanium. The star shows slight variations in the TiO spectral lines.

=== Planetary system ===
In 2018, two teams independently reported the discovery of an exoplanet orbiting HD 147379A, both via the radial-velocity method. This was the first exoplanet found by the CARMENES survey. The planet, commonly referred to as HD 147379 b, has a minimum mass of 21.6 ± 1.1 M_{🜨}, slightly more massive than Neptune (17.147 M_{🜨}). It orbits its host star once every 86.58 days at about a third of the distance from Earth to the Sun, placing it within the conservative habitable zone of the star, where liquid water could exist.

One of the teams that discovered HD 147379 b proposed another candidate planet, this one with a minimum mass of 27 M_{🜨} and a 500-day period, orbiting at a distance of about 1 AU. However, a 2023 follow-up study did not detect such a signal. Instead, they detected a signal with a 12.3-day period, but discarded it due to the high chance of it being a false positive. Nevertheless, it is highly likely that a second planet exists interior to b's orbit.

The HD 147379A planetary system
Companion (in order from star)	Mass	Semimajor axis (AU)	Orbital period (days)	Eccentricity	Inclination (°)	Radius
b	≥21.6 ± 1.1 M_{🜨}	0.3315 ± 0.0024	86.58 ± 0.14	0.0630^{+0.0470}_{−0.0380}	—	—

== HD 147379B ==
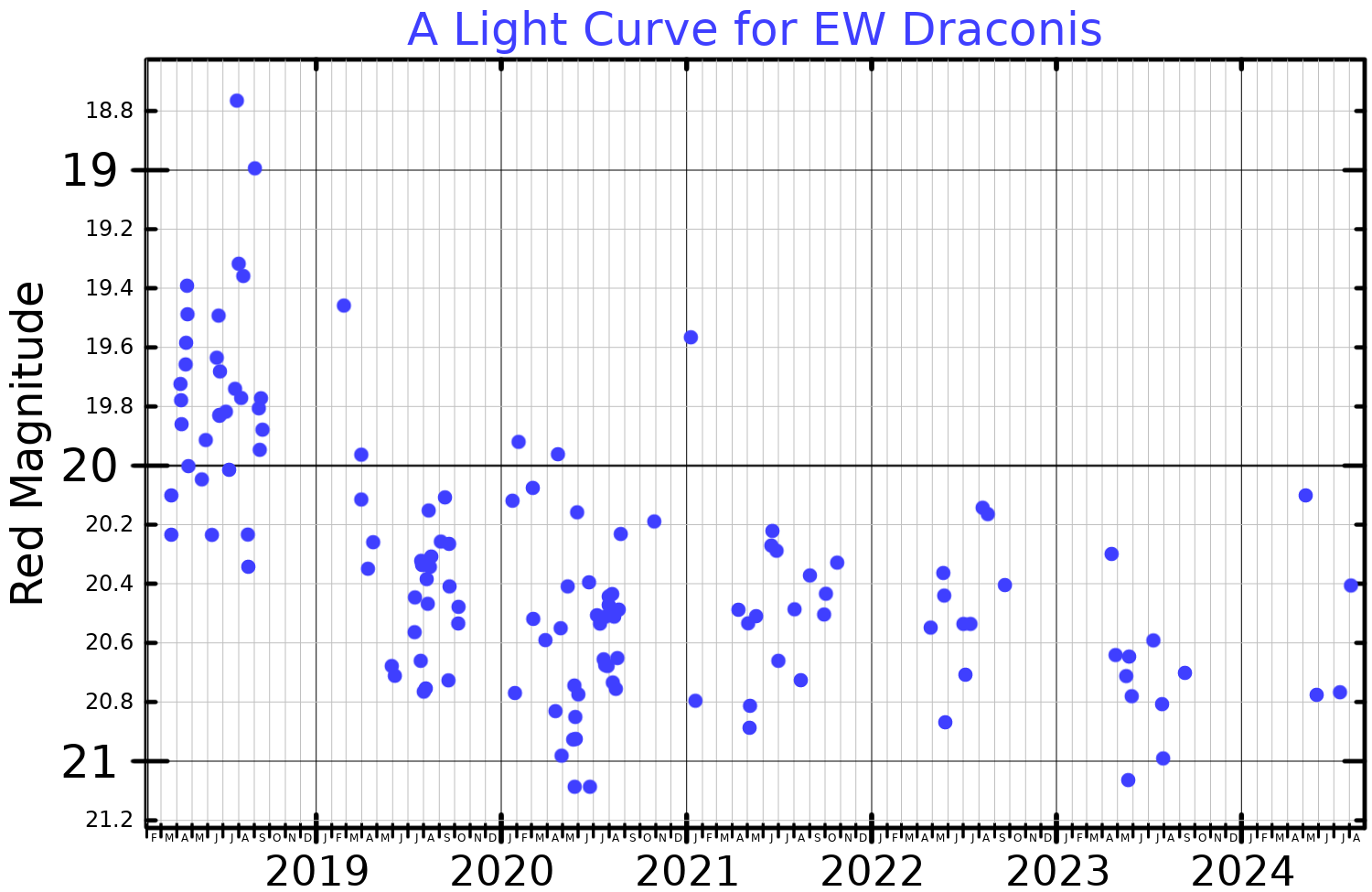
A red-light light curve plotted from ZTF data

HD 147379B (HIP 79762) is a gravitationally bound companion to HD 147379A at a separation of 64.4 arcseconds, which corresponds to a distance of 693.4 AU.

This is a red dwarf with a spectral type of M3V, about 45% the mass of the Sun and 46% the radius. It has a "partially convective" structure, meaning that the outer convection zone does not reach down to the core, as opposed to "fully convective" stars weighing less than 0.35 M_{☉} that are convective throughout. It too has a high metallicity of [M/H]=0.20±0.10 dex, translating to a roughly 60% excess in elements heavier than hydrogen and helium compared to the Sun. At an effective temperature of 3,525 K (3,252 °C; 5,885 °F), it radiates just 2.6% the luminosity of the Sun from its photosphere. It rotates on its axis once every 40.4 days at a relatively slow projected equatorial velocity of 0.50 km/s.

It has a magnetic field that fluctuated in strength between 36-75 G between 2020-2022, approximately 100 times stronger than Earth's magnetic field (0.22-0.67 G) and similar to those of faster-rotating red dwarfs. The variations in strength are smaller than those seen in fully convective red dwarfs such as Gliese 1151.

In 1994, the star was reported to have a high likelihood (99%) of exhibiting long-term variability, albeit the author noted that this may be suspect. It was formally classified as a BY Draconis variable in 1997, receiving the variable-star designation EW Draconis.
