= Wolf 359 =

Red dwarf in the constellation Leo

- Wolf 359 is shown near the ecliptic in the southern region of Leo.

Observation data Epoch J2000 Equinox ICRS
- Constellation: Leo
- Right ascension: 10^{h} 56^{m} 28.92087^{s}
- Declination: +07° 00′ 53.0033″
- Apparent magnitude (V): 13.507

Characteristics
- Spectral type: M6V
- Apparent magnitude (J): 7.1
- Apparent magnitude (K): 6.1
- U−B color index: +1.165
- B−V color index: +2.034
- Variable type: UV Ceti

Astrometry
Radial velocity (R_{v})	+19±1 km/s
Proper motion (μ)	RA: −3,866.338 mas/yr Dec.: −2,699.215 mas/yr
Parallax (π)	415.1794±0.0684 mas
Distance	7.856 ± 0.001 ly (2.4086 ± 0.0004 pc)
Absolute magnitude (M_{V})	16.614

Details
Mass	0.110±0.003 M_{☉}
Radius	0.144±0.004 R_{☉}
Luminosity	0.00106 ± 0.00002 L_{☉}
Habitable zone inner limit	0.024 AU
Habitable zone outer limit	0.052 AU
Surface gravity (log g)	5.5 cgs
Temperature	2,749+44 −41 K
Metallicity [Fe/H]	+0.25 dex
Rotation	2.704±0.003 d
Rotational velocity (v sin i)	2.9±0.8 km/s
Age	0.1–1.5 Gyr

Other designations
- CN Leonis, CN Leo, GJ 406, G 045-020, LTT 12923, LFT 750, LHS 36, GCTP 2553

Database references
SIMBAD	data

Wolf 359 is a red dwarf star located in the constellation Leo, near the ecliptic. At a distance of 7.86 light-years (2.41 parsecs) from Earth, it has an apparent magnitude of 13.54 and can only be seen with a large telescope. Wolf 359 is one of the nearest stars to the Sun with only the Alpha Centauri system (including Proxima Centauri), Barnard's Star, and the brown dwarfs Luhman 16 (WISE 1049-5319) and WISE 0855−0714 known to be closer. Its proximity to Earth has led to its mention in several works of fiction.

Wolf 359 is one of the faintest and least-massive nearby stars known. At the light-emitting layer called the photosphere, it has a temperature of ~2,800 K, low enough for chemical compounds to form and survive. The absorption lines of compounds such as water and titanium(II) oxide have been observed in its spectrum. The star's surface has a magnetic field hundreds of times as strong as that of the Sun, generated by its thorough internal convection. As a result of this significant magnetic activity, Wolf 359 is a flare star that can undergo sudden and great increases in luminosity, which can persist for several minutes. These flares emit strong bursts of X-ray and gamma ray radiation that have been observed by space telescopes. It is a relatively young star with an estimated age of less than a billion years. No planetary companions for Wolf 359 have been confirmed so far, though there is one unverified candidate; as of yet, no debris disks have been found.

== Observation history and name ==
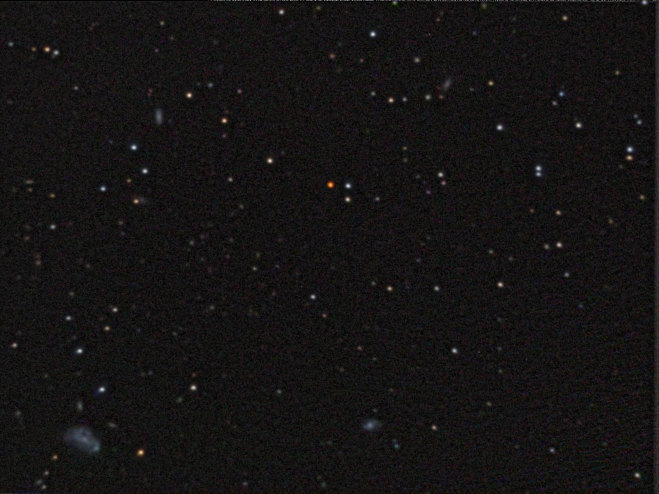
Wolf 359 is the orange-hued star located just above the center of this 2009 astrophotograph.

Wolf 359 first came to the attention of astronomers because of its relatively high rate of transverse motion against the background, also known as the proper motion. A high rate of proper motion can indicate that the star is located nearby, as closer stars can achieve the same rate of angular change with a lower relative speed. The proper motion of Wolf 359 was first measured in 1917 by German astronomer Max Wolf, aided by astrophotography. In 1919 he published a catalogue of over one thousand stars with high proper motions, including this one, that are still identified by his name. He listed this star as entry number 359, and the star has since been referred to as Wolf 359, in reference to Max Wolf's work.

The first parallax measurement of Wolf 359 was reported in 1928 from the Mount Wilson Observatory, yielding an cyclic annual shift in the star's position of 0.407 ± 0.009 arcseconds. From this position change, and the known size of the Earth's orbit, the distance to the star could be estimated. It was the faintest and least-massive star known until the discovery of VB 10 in 1944. The infrared magnitude of the star was measured in 1957. In 1969, a brief flare in the luminosity of Wolf 359 was observed, linking it to a class of variable stars known as flare stars.

== Properties ==
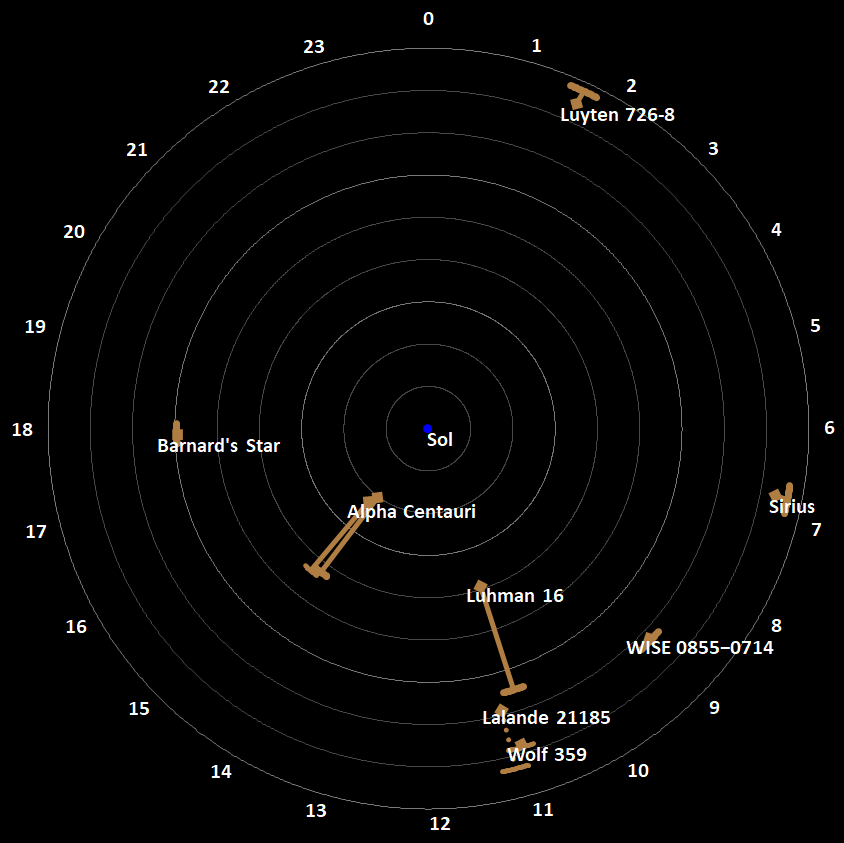
The position of Wolf 359 on a radar map among all stellar objects or stellar systems within 9 light years (ly) from the map's center, the Sun (Sol). The diamond-shapes are their positions entered according to right ascension in hours angle (indicated at the edge of the map's reference disc), and according to their declination. The second mark shows each's distance from Sol, with the concentric circles indicating the distance in steps of one ly.

Wolf 359 has a stellar classification of M6, although various sources list a spectral class of M5.5, M6.5 or M8. Most M-type stars are red dwarfs: they are visually red because the energy emission of such stars reaches a peak in the red and infrared parts of the spectrum. Wolf 359 has a very low luminosity, emitting about 0.1% of the Sun's power. If it were moved to the location of the Sun, it would appear ten times as bright as the full Moon.

At an estimated 11% of the Sun's mass, Wolf 359 is just above the lower limit at which a star's core can undergo hydrogen fusion through the proton–proton chain reaction: ~8% of the solar mass. (Substellar objects below this limit are known as brown dwarfs.) The radius of Wolf 359 is an estimated 14.4% that of the Sun, or about 100,200 km. For comparison, the equatorial radius of the planet Jupiter is 71,490 km, making the star a mere 40% wider than the planet.

The entire star undergoes convection, whereby the energy generated at the core is transported toward the surface by the convective motion of stellar plasma, rather than through electromagnetic radiation. This constant circulation redistributes throughout the star any excess accumulation of helium in the core generated by stellar nucleosynthesis. This process allows Wolf 359 to remain on the main sequence as a hydrogen fusing star for proportionately longer than one such as the Sun, for which helium steadily accumulates in the core and is not diluted. In conjunction with a much lower rate of hydrogen consumption due to its low mass and core temperature, Wolf 359 is expected to remain a main sequence star for about eight trillion years before finally exhausting its hydrogen supply and ending up as a helium white dwarf.

A search of this star by the Hubble Space Telescope revealed no stellar companions. No excess infrared emission has been detected, which may indicate the lack of a debris disk around it.

=== Outer atmosphere ===
The outer, light-emitting layer of a star is known as the photosphere. Estimates of the photospheric temperature of Wolf 359 range from 2,500 K to 2,900 K, which is sufficiently cool for equilibrium chemistry to occur. The resulting chemical compounds survive long enough to be observed through their spectral lines. Numerous molecular bands appear in the spectrum of Wolf 359, including those of carbon monoxide (CO), iron hydride (FeH), chromium hydride (CrH), water (H_{2}O), magnesium hydride (MgH), vanadium(II) oxide (VO), titanium(II) oxide (TiO), and possibly the molecule CaOH. Since there are no lines of lithium in the spectrum, this element must have already been consumed by fusion in the core. This indicates that the star must be at least 100 million years old.

Beyond the photosphere lies a nebulous, high temperature region known as the stellar corona. In 2001, Wolf 359 became the first star other than the Sun to have the spectrum of its corona observed by a ground-based telescope. The spectrum showed emission lines of Fe XIII, which is heavily ionized iron that has been stripped of twelve of its twenty-six electrons. The strength of this line can vary over a time period of several hours, which may be evidence of microflare heating.

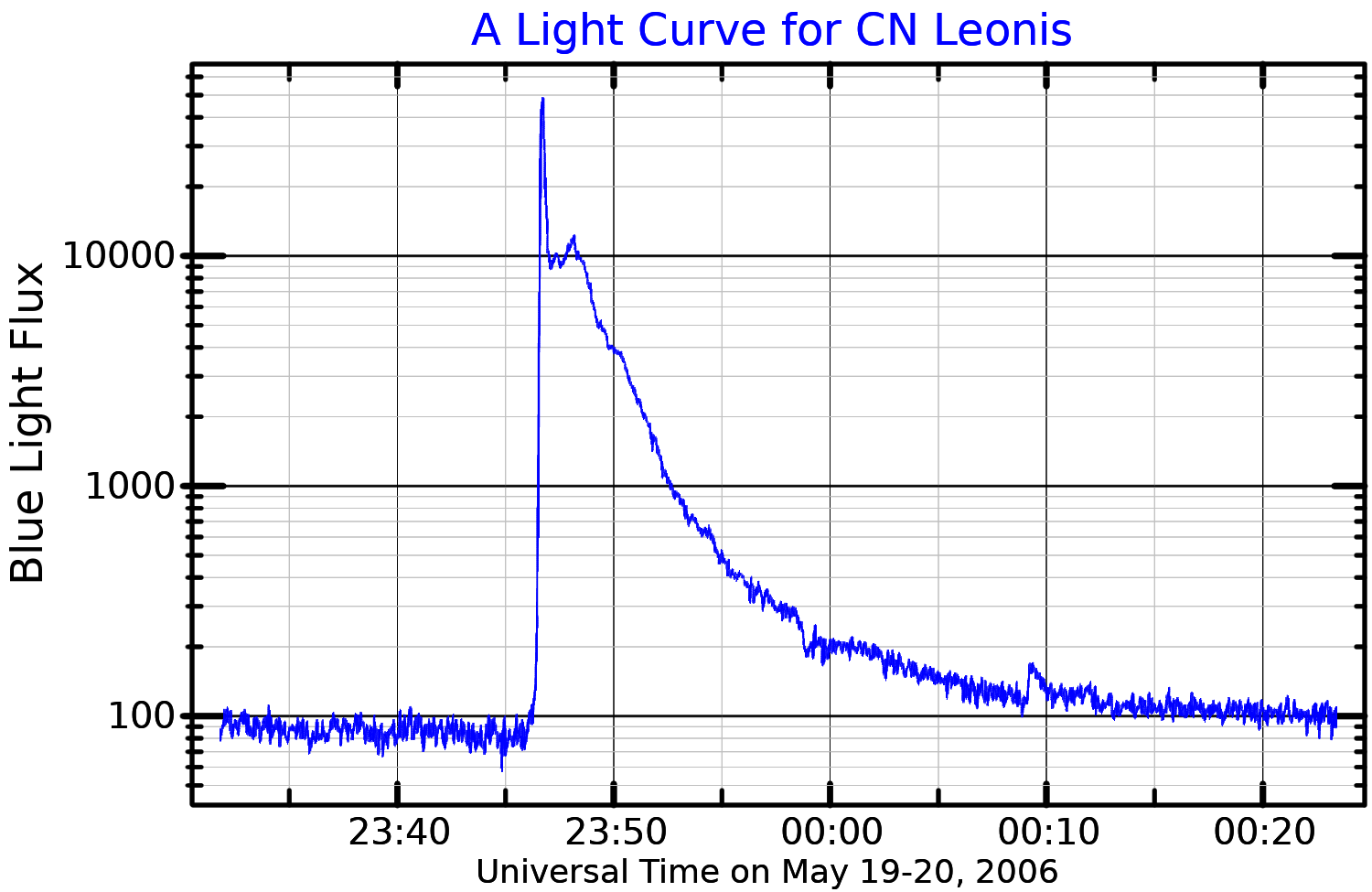
A blue band light curve for a flare of CN Leonis, adapted from Liefke et al. (2007)

Wolf 359 is classified as a UV Ceti-type flare star, a category of stars that undergo brief, dramatic increases in luminosity due to intense magnetic field activity in their photospheres. Its variable star designation is CN Leonis. Wolf 359 has a relatively high flare rate. Observations with the Hubble Space Telescope detected 32 flare events within a two-hour period, with energies of 10^{27} ergs (10^{20} joules) and higher. The mean magnetic field strength at the surface of the star is around 2.2 kG (0.22 teslas), but this value varies significantly on time scales as short as six hours. In comparison, the magnetic field of the Sun averages a strength of 1 gauss (100 μT), although it can reach as high as 3 kG (0.3 T) in active sunspot regions. During periods of flare activity, Wolf 359 has been observed to emit X-rays and gamma rays.

=== Motion ===
Distances of the nearest stars from 20,000 years ago to 80,000 years in the future. Wolf 359 is not displayed, but it is currently at a distance of 7.9 ly and increasing, with a past minimum of 7.3 ly around 13,850 years ago.

The rotation of a star causes a Doppler shift of its spectrum, generally resulting in a broadening of the absorption lines in its spectrum, with the lines increasing in width with higher rotational speeds. However, only the rotational velocity's component in the direction of the observer can be measured by this method, and the resulting data imposes only a lower limit on the star's rotational speed. This projected rotational velocity of Wolf 359 at its equator is less than 3 km/s, below the threshold of detection with spectral line broadening. This low rate of rotation may have been caused by the loss of angular momentum through its stellar wind, which increases greatly during periods of flare activity. Roughly speaking, the spin-down timescale of a star of spectral class M6 is somewhat long, at ~10 billion years, as fully convective stars lose their rotational speeds more slowly than others. However, evolutionary models suggest that Wolf 359 is a relatively young star with an age of less than a billion years.

Wolf 359's proper motion is 4.696 arcseconds per year, and moving away from the Sun at a velocity of ~19 km/s. When translated into the galactic coordinate system, the motion corresponds to a space velocity of (U, V, W) = (−26, −44, −18) km/s. This space velocity implies that Wolf 359 belongs to the population of old-disk stars. It follows an orbit through the Milky Way that will bring it as close as 20.5 kly (6.3 kpc) and as distant as 28 kly (8.6 kpc) from the Galactic Center. The predicted galactic orbit has an eccentricity of 0.156, and the star can travel as far as 444 light-years (136 pc) away from the galactic plane. The closest stellar neighbor to Wolf 359 is the red dwarf Ross 128, at 3.79 ly (1.16 pc). Approximately 13,850 years before the present day, Wolf 359 attained its minimal separation of about 7.35 ly (2.25 pc) from the Sun, and has been receding away ever since.

== Search for planets ==
Radial velocity measurements of the star in 2011 using the Near Infrared Spectrometer (NIRSPEC) instrument at the Keck II observatory did not reveal any variations that might otherwise indicate the presence of an orbiting companion. This instrumentation is sensitive enough to detect the gravitational perturbations of massive, short period companions with the mass of Neptune or greater.

In June 2019, an international team of astronomers led by Mikko Tuomi from the University of Hertfordshire, UK, submitted a preprint with the results of the first reported detection of two candidate exoplanets orbiting Wolf 359 using the radial velocity method from observations with HARPS in Chile and HIRES in Hawaii. If these planets were confirmed, the setup of the system would be similar to but more extreme than that of the nearby red dwarf Proxima Centauri, with both having a close-in low-mass planet and a farther out higher-mass planet. The theorized and later ruled-out inner planet, Wolf 359 c, would receive per unit area about forty times as much radiative energy as compared to Earth, making it unlikely to be a habitable planet. The as yet unconfimed Wolf 359 b, in contrast, is classified as a cool super-Neptune, receiving roughly a third to a quarter of the energy per unit area as Neptune does from the Sun.

Further observations from the CARMENES survey have found that the radial velocity signal corresponding to the inner planet candidate Wolf 359 c is a false positive, resulting from the rotation of the star rather than a planetary companion. A 2023 follow-up study using MAROON-X, CARMENES, HARPS, and HIRES radial velocity data as well as imaging data was unable to either confirm or refute the presence of Wolf 359 b. The same study ruled out the existence of any brown dwarfs or massive gas giant companions within 10 AU of the star, planets more than half the mass of Jupiter within 1 AU, and planets more massive than Uranus within 0.1 AU.

The Wolf 359 planetary system
Companion (in order from star)	Mass	Semimajor axis (AU)	Orbital period (days)	Eccentricity	Inclination (°)	Radius
b (unconfirmed)	≥43.9+29.5 −23.9 M_{🜨}	1.845+0.289 −0.258	2,938±436	0.04+0.27 −0.04	—	—

== In popular culture ==
Wolf 359 is an episode of the original The Outer Limits television show. It first aired on 7 November 1964, during its second season.

Wolf 359 is notable for being the location and namesake of the Battle of Wolf 359 in the Star Trek universe.

A space station in orbit around the star is the primary setting of Wolf 359 (podcast).

The Gregory Benford novel Across the Sea of Suns features a scene set at Wolf 359.

== See also ==
- List of brown dwarfs
- List of nearest stars and brown dwarfs
