= Suvrath Mahadevan =

Indian astrophysicist

Suvrath Mahadevan is an Indian astrophysicist.

Mahadevan graduated from Indian Institute of Technology Bombay in 2000 with a degree in engineering physics. He subsequently moved to the United States, where he earned a doctorate in astrophysics from the University of Florida in 2006. Mahadevan remained at the University of Florida until 2009 for postdoctoral research purposes, then joined the Pennsylvania State University faculty in 2009. In 2023, Penn State named Mahadevan the Verne M. Willaman Professor of Astronomy and Astrophysics. He is the Principle Investigator of two Extreme Precision Radial Velocity Spectrographs, The Habitable-zone Planet Finder (HPF) on the Hobby Eberly Telescope and NEID on the WIYN Telescope.
