= ADS 7251 =

Binary star system in the constellation Ursa Major

- Location of ADS 7251 in the constellation Ursa Major

Observation data Epoch J2000 Equinox ICRS
- Constellation: Ursa Major
- ADS 7251 A
- Right ascension: 09^{h} 14^{m} 22.7749^{s}
- Declination: +52° 41′ 11.792″
- Apparent magnitude (V): 7.64
- ADS 7251 B
- Right ascension: 09^{h} 14^{m} 24.6828^{s}
- Declination: +52° 41′ 10.902″
- Apparent magnitude (V): 7.70

Characteristics

ADS 7251 A (HD 79210)
- Spectral type: M0V
- Apparent magnitude (B): 9.05
- Apparent magnitude (G): 6.976
- Apparent magnitude (J): 4.89 (Note: 2MASS infrared magnitudes flagged as unreliable or upper limits)
- Apparent magnitude (H): 3.987
- Apparent magnitude (K): 3.99
- B−V color index: +1.41
- J−H color index: +0.90 (Note: Calculated from 2MASS magnitudes)
- J−K color index: +0.90

ADS 7251 B (HD 79211)
- Spectral type: K7V
- Apparent magnitude (B): 9.04
- Apparent magnitude (G): 7.054
- Apparent magnitude (J): 4.779
- Apparent magnitude (H): 4.043
- Apparent magnitude (K): 4.14
- B−V color index: +1.42
- J−H color index: +0.74
- J−K color index: +0.64

Astrometry

ADS 7251 A (HD 79210)
| Radial velocity (R_{v}) | 11.245±0.0007 km/s |
| Proper motion (μ) | RA: −1,545.787(18)‍ mas/yr Dec.: −569.053(18)‍ mas/yr |
| Parallax (π) | 157.8879±0.0197 mas |
| Distance | 20.657 ± 0.003 ly (6.3336 ± 0.0008 pc) |
| Absolute magnitude (M_{V}) | 8.637 |

ADS 7251 B
| Radial velocity (R_{v}) | 12.104±0.0008 km/s |
| Proper motion (μ) | RA: −1,573.040(18)‍ mas/yr Dec.: −659.906(19)‍ mas/yr |
| Parallax (π) | 157.8825±0.0211 mas |
| Distance | 20.658 ± 0.003 ly (6.3338 ± 0.0008 pc) |
| Absolute magnitude (M_{V}) | 8.712 |

Orbit
| Period (P) | 975 yr |
| Semi-major axis (a) | 16.725" (105.93 AU (Note: Semi-major axis in AU = $\frac{semimajor\ axis\ in\ seconds}{parallax}\ {{=}}\ \frac{16.725}{0.15789}$ = 105.93 AU; as the eccentricity is 0.28, the distance fluctuates between 72% and 128% of that, roughly from 76 AU to 136 AU.)) |
| Eccentricity (e) | 0.28 |

Details

A
| Mass | 0.69±0.07 M_{☉} |
| Radius | 0.58±0.02 R_{☉} |
| Luminosity | 0.0789±0.0038 L_{☉} |
| Surface gravity (log g) | 4.68±0.07 cgs |
| Temperature | 4,024±51 K |
| Metallicity [Fe/H] | −0.05±0.16 dex |
| Rotation | 16.3+3.5 −1.3 d |
| Rotational velocity (v sin i) | 2.9±1.2 km/s |
| Age | 1–7 Gyr |

B
| Mass | 0.64±0.07 M_{☉} |
| Radius | 0.58±0.03 R_{☉} |
| Luminosity | 0.0792±0.0031 L_{☉} |
| Surface gravity (log g) | 4.68±0.07 cgs |
| Temperature | 4,005±51 K |
| Metallicity [Fe/H] | −0.03±0.16 dex |
| Rotation | 16.61±0.04 d |
| Rotational velocity (v sin i) | 2.3±1.5 km/s |
| Age | 1–7 Gyr |

Other designations
- GJ 338, ADS 7251, WDS J09144+5241
- A: BD+53°1320, HD 79210, HIP 45343
- B: BD+53°1321, HD 79211, HIP 120005

Database references
| SIMBAD | The system |
- A
- B
| Exoplanet Archive | data |

ADS 7251 is a binary star system 6.33 parsecs (20.66 light years) from the Sun. The components are near-identical red dwarfs separated by 17″ in 2019.

The two stars share a mildly eccentric orbit with a semimajor axis of 16.725″ and a period of 975 years. Their separation has closed from 21.1″ when they were discovered by F. G. W. Struve in 1821 to 16.9″ in 2019. Struve also documented two much fainter stars about 3′ from the two red dwarfs.

ADS 7251 A is 0.06 magnitudes (six percent) brighter than ADS 7251 B. A catalogue of MK spectral classes lists both stars as secondary standards, with ADS 7251 A being class M0V and ADS 7251 B being class K7V, noted as being unusual in the brighter star having a later spectral type. Other publications have described the stars as being both K7V, both M0V, or the primary being K7V and the secondary M0V.

== Planetary system ==
ADS 7251 B, also known as Gliese 338 B or HD 79211, is orbited by one known planet discovered in 2020 by radial velocity. Though described as a super-Earth by its discovery paper, it is closer in mass to Uranus. An independent confirmation of the planet was published in 2022.

The ADS 7251 B (Gliese 338 B) planetary system
| Companion (in order from star) | Mass | Semimajor axis (AU) | Orbital period (days) | Eccentricity | Inclination (°) | Radius |
|---|---|---|---|---|---|---|
| b | ≥10.6±1.2 M_{🜨} | 0.142±0.005 | 24.422±0.014 | 0.109+0.100 −0.075 | — | — |

== See also ==
- List of nearest K-type stars
