= Gliese 357 d =

Habitable super-Earth orbiting GJ 357

GJ 357 d
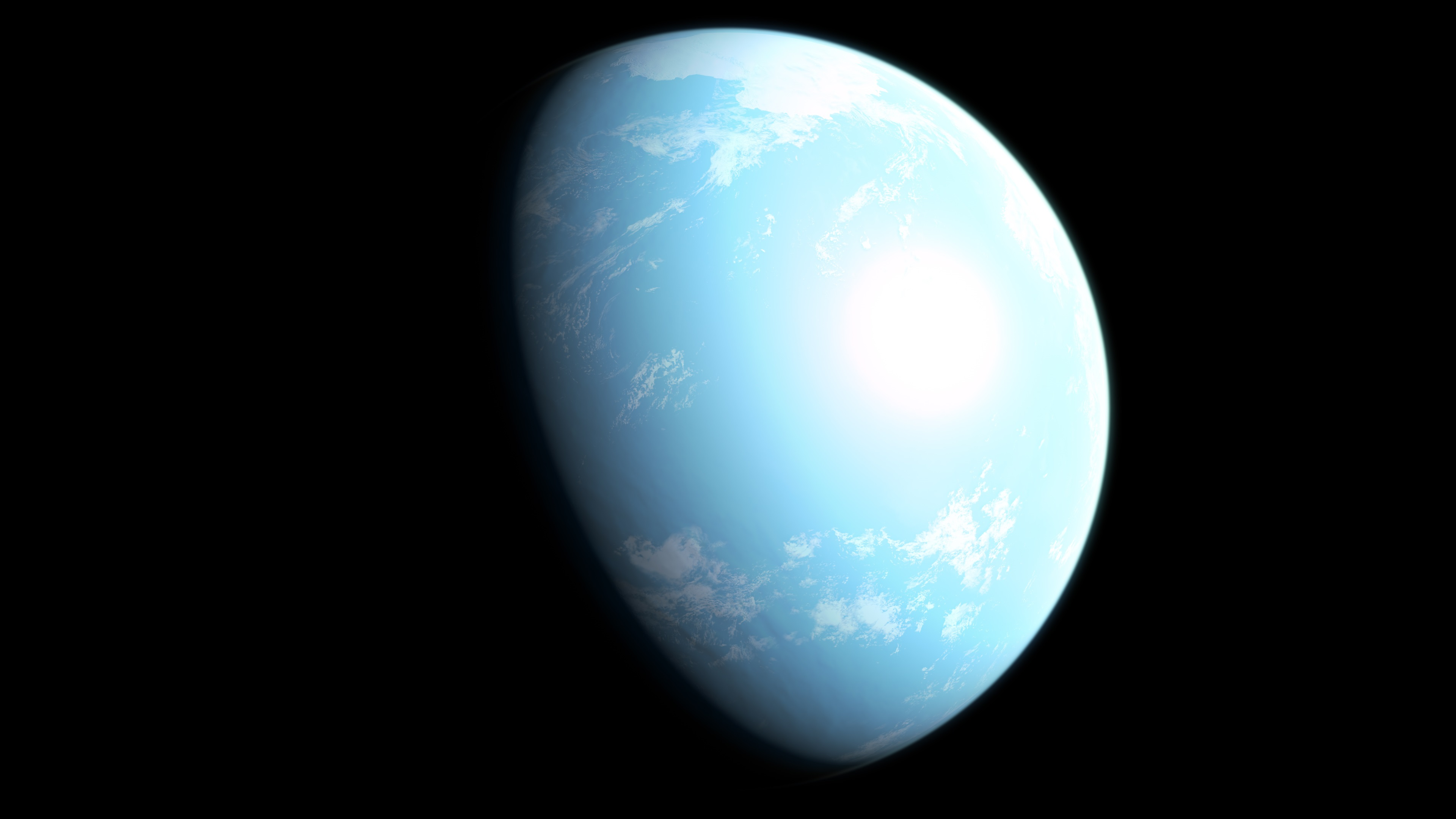

Discovery
- Discovered by: Rafael Luque, Diana Kossakowski
- Discovery site: TESS
- Discovery date: 2019
- Detection method: Radial velocity

Orbital characteristics
- Semi-major axis: 0.204±0.015 AU
- Eccentricity: ≈0.033 ± 0.057
- Orbital period (sidereal): 55.70±0.05 d
- Inclination: <40°
- Star: GJ 357

Physical characteristics
- Mass: 6.1±1.0 M_{🜨} 7.20±1.07 M_{🜨}
- Temperature: 219.6 ± 5.9 K (−53.55 ± 5.90 °C; −64.39 ± 10.62 °F)

GJ 357 d is an exoplanet, considered to be a super-Earth within the habitable zone of its parent star. The planet orbits GJ 357, 31 light-years from Earth, The system lies in the constellation Hydra.

The planet was discovered by the TESS team and announced in July 2019. The data confirming the presence of the planet was uncovered in ground-based observation dating back to 1998 while confirming the TESS detection of GJ 357 b, a “hot planet” that orbits much closer to the parent star.

Even though GJ 357 d is 20% closer to GJ 357 than Earth is to the Sun, GJ 357 is much smaller than the Sun, receiving only as much energy as Mars. As a result, it is estimated that the average temperature is -64°F (-53°C), but this temperature is survivable for humans; if there is a thick enough atmosphere, the actual temperature could be much higher. If humans traveled there using modern spacecraft, it would take them about 660,000 years to get there. (Note: Calculated assuming the spacecraft travels at 14 km/s. For comparison, the New Horizons spacecraft is exiting the solar system at a velocity of 13.7 km/s as of June 2024.) The planet is 6.1 times more massive than Earth and 2.3 times Earth's size.
