= TZ Arietis =

Nearby red dwarf star in the constellation Aries

- Location of TZ Arietis in the constellation Aries

Observation data Epoch J2000 Equinox ICRS
- Constellation: Aries
- Right ascension: 02^{h} 00^{m} 12.95632^{s}
- Declination: +13° 03′ 07.0006″
- Apparent magnitude (V): 12.298

Characteristics
- Evolutionary stage: main sequence
- Spectral type: M4.5 V
- U−B color index: +1.37
- B−V color index: +1.80
- R−I color index: 1.39
- Variable type: Flare star

Astrometry
Radial velocity (R_{v})	−28.29±0.25 km/s
Proper motion (μ)	RA: 1096.458 mas/yr Dec.: -1771.526 mas/yr
Parallax (π)	223.7321±0.0699 mas
Distance	14.578 ± 0.005 ly (4.470 ± 0.001 pc)
Absolute magnitude (M_{V})	14.03

Details
Mass	0.14 M_{☉}
Radius	0.161 R_{☉}
Luminosity	0.00135 L_{☉}
Surface gravity (log g)	5.05 cgs
Temperature	3,158 K
Metallicity [Fe/H]	−0.14 dex
Rotation	1.96±0.01 days
Rotational velocity (v sin i)	3.8 km/s
Age	4.8 Gyr

Other designations
- TZ Ari, GJ 83.1, GJ 9066, G 003-033, L 1159-16, LFT 171, LHS 11, PLX 412.02, 2MASS J02001278+1303112

Database references
SIMBAD	data
Exoplanet Archive	data

TZ Arietis (also known as Gliese 83.1, GJ 9066, or L 1159-16) is a red dwarf in the northern constellation of Aries. With a normal apparent visual magnitude of 12.3, it is too faint to be seen by the naked eye, although it lies relatively close at a distance of 14.6 light-years (4.47 parsecs). It is a flare star, which means it can suddenly increase in brightness for short periods of time.

== Variability ==
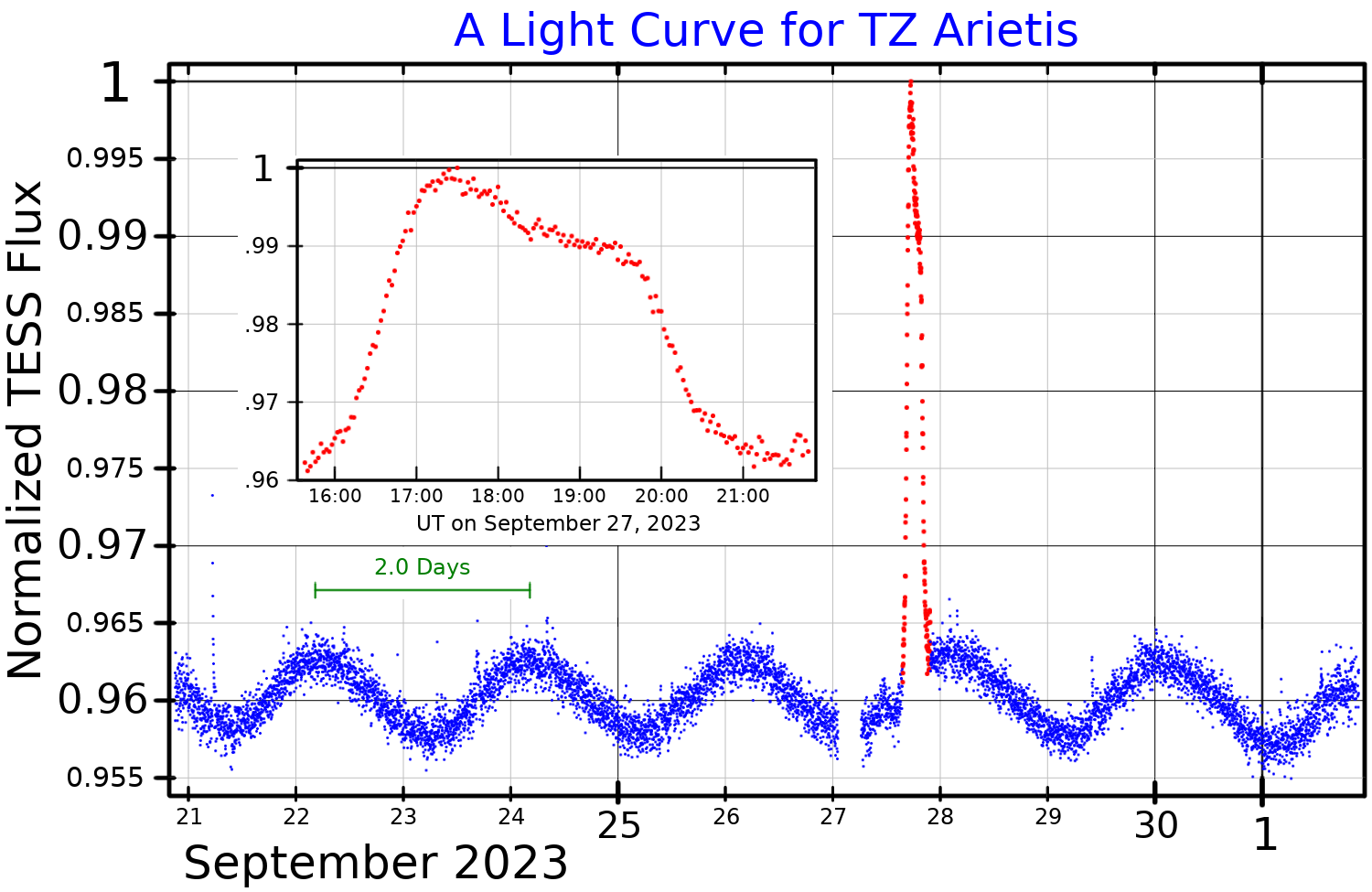
A light curve for TZ Arietis, plotted from TESS data. The blue points show the BY Draconis-type variability, and the red points show a flare. The inset plot shows the flare with an expanded horizontal scale. The star's 2.0 day rotation period is marked in green.

William E. Kunkel announced that TZ Arietis is a variable star in 1968. It is a flare star, showing brief increases in brightness due to eruptions from its surface. In the ultraviolet, flares of over a magnitude have been observed. In addition it shows longterm variations in brightness which may be due to starspots and rotation, possibly classifying it as a BY Draconis variable. It was given the variable star designation TZ Arietis in 1970.

== Planetary system ==
In a preprint submitted to arXiv in June 2019, three candidate planets were reported in orbit around this star (GJ 83.1) with orbital periods of 2, 240, and 770 days. A paper published in August 2020 reported a confirmation of the 240-day and 770-day planets, designating them "b" and "c", respectively.

In March 2022, astronomers using the Calar Alto Observatory in Spain, as part of the CARMENES survey project, reported an independent confirmation of the 770-day planet, which they designated "b". However, they found no evidence for the 240-day planet, and confidently defined the 2-day candidate as nothing more than a spurious chromatic effect of the star, linked to its rotation. The NASA Exoplanet Archive still refers to the confirmed, 770-day planet as "c".

The TZ Arietis planetary system
Companion (in order from star)	Mass	Semimajor axis (AU)	Orbital period (days)	Eccentricity	Inclination (°)	Radius
b (Note: Referred to as c by some sources.)	≥0.21±0.02 M_{J}	0.88±0.02	771.36+1.34 −1.23	0.46±0.04	—	—
