= HIP 57050 =

Star in the constellation Ursa Major

Observation data Epoch J2000 Equinox ICRS
- Constellation: Ursa Major
- Right ascension: 11^{h} 41^{m} 44.63584^{s}
- Declination: +42° 45′ 07.1021″
- Apparent magnitude (V): 11.86

Characteristics
- Spectral type: M4.0V
- U−B color index: +1.52
- B−V color index: +1.503±0.012
- V−R color index: +1.19

Astrometry
Radial velocity (R_{v})	−8.99±0.0014 km/s
Proper motion (μ)	RA: −575.528(26) mas/yr Dec.: −89.799(25) mas/yr
Parallax (π)	90.6896±0.0258 mas
Distance	35.96 ± 0.01 ly (11.027 ± 0.003 pc)
Absolute magnitude (M_{V})	11.64

Details
Mass	0.357±0.013 M_{☉}
Radius	0.4 R_{☉}
Luminosity	0.01486 L_{☉}
Surface gravity (log g)	4.67 cgs
Temperature	3,236±18 K
Metallicity [Fe/H]	0.32±0.06 dex
Rotation	71.5±5.1 d
Rotational velocity (v sin i)	2.0 km/s
Age	4.44±0.016 Gyr

Other designations
- GJ 1148, HIP 57050, G 122-40, LHS 2443, LTT 13210, Ross 1003, 2MASS J11414471+4245072, Gaia DR2 772430527947893632

Database references
SIMBAD	data
Exoplanet Archive	data
ARICNS	data

HIP 57050, or GJ 1148, is a faint star with two orbiting exoplanets in the northern constellation of Ursa Major. Other designations for this star include LHS 2443, G 122-40, and Ross 1003. From a distance of 36 light years based on parallax measurements, it is drifting closer to the Sun with a radial velocity of -9 km/s. This is a faint star with an absolute magnitude of 11.64. At the distance of HIP 57050, the apparent visual magnitude is 11.86, which is much too faint to be seen with the naked eye. HD 164595 has a high proper motion, traversing the celestial sphere at an angular rate of 0.577″ yr^{−1}.

The spectrum of HIP 57050 matches a small M-type main-sequence star, a red dwarf, with a stellar classification of M4.0V. HIP 57050 has a metallicity twice that of the Sun and is among the highest in the immediate solar neighborhood. It has a quiet chromosphere that displays little magnetic activity. A minimal level of amplitude variation from rotation suggests the star may be viewed from nearly pole-on. This star has 36% of the Sun's mass and 40% of the radius of the Sun. It is radiating just 1.5% of the luminosity of the Sun from its photosphere at an effective temperature of 3,236 K.

== Planetary system ==
A team led by astronomer Nader Haghighipour reported the discovery of a Saturn-mass planet in the habitable zone of the star in 2010. According to Haghighipour, the detection is important because it "indicates that observational techniques are on the right track for finding habitable low-mass rocky planets similar to Earth."

According to its discoverers, HIP 57050 b provides support for the proposition that planet-bearing M-class stars tend to be metal-rich, a correlation already observed in F, G and K-class stars.

At the expected planetary effective temperature, the atmosphere may contain water clouds, potentially detectable by the Hubble Space Telescope if it could capture a planetary transit.

The planet's discoverers speculated about the possibility of a habitable exomoon:

"By analogy with our own solar system, whose gas giants all have dozens of moons, one might expect HIP 57050 b to also harbor such moons. In our solar system, ~0.02% of the masses of the gas giants are assigned to their satellites. This would translate to a satellite with ~2% of Earth's mass (similar to Titan) orbiting HIP 57050 b. While it is not out of the question that HIP 57050 b could harbor a moon, and that moon would thus be in the liquid water HZ of the parent star, an object with only 1/5th of the mass of Mars in the liquid water HZ is probably not a particularly good prospect for habitability from various standpoints. In any case, direct detection of such a moon would be extremely challenging."

Paul Gilster of the Tau Zero Foundation has commented:

"Based on our knowledge of the gas giants in our own Solar System, it's a natural supposition that this is a world with moons, and if so, their location in the habitable zone draws inevitable comparisons with fictional worlds like Pandora."

Gilster suggested that an Earth-sized moon could exist around the planet if it were captured after forming independently.

A second planet was suspected based on additional radial velocity measurements made at W. M. Keck Observatory, and this was confirmed by measurements taken at Calar Alto Observatory in 2017.

The HIP 57050 planetary system
Companion (in order from star)	Mass	Semimajor axis (AU)	Orbital period (days)	Eccentricity	Inclination (°)	Radius
b	≥98.2±2.9 M_{🜨}	0.17±0.02	41.3795±0.0011	0.3824±0.007	—	—
c	≥74.0±2.9 M_{🜨}	0.914±0.013	531.89±0.5	0.408±0.019	—	—
