= Gliese 357 =

Red dwarf star in the constellation Hydra

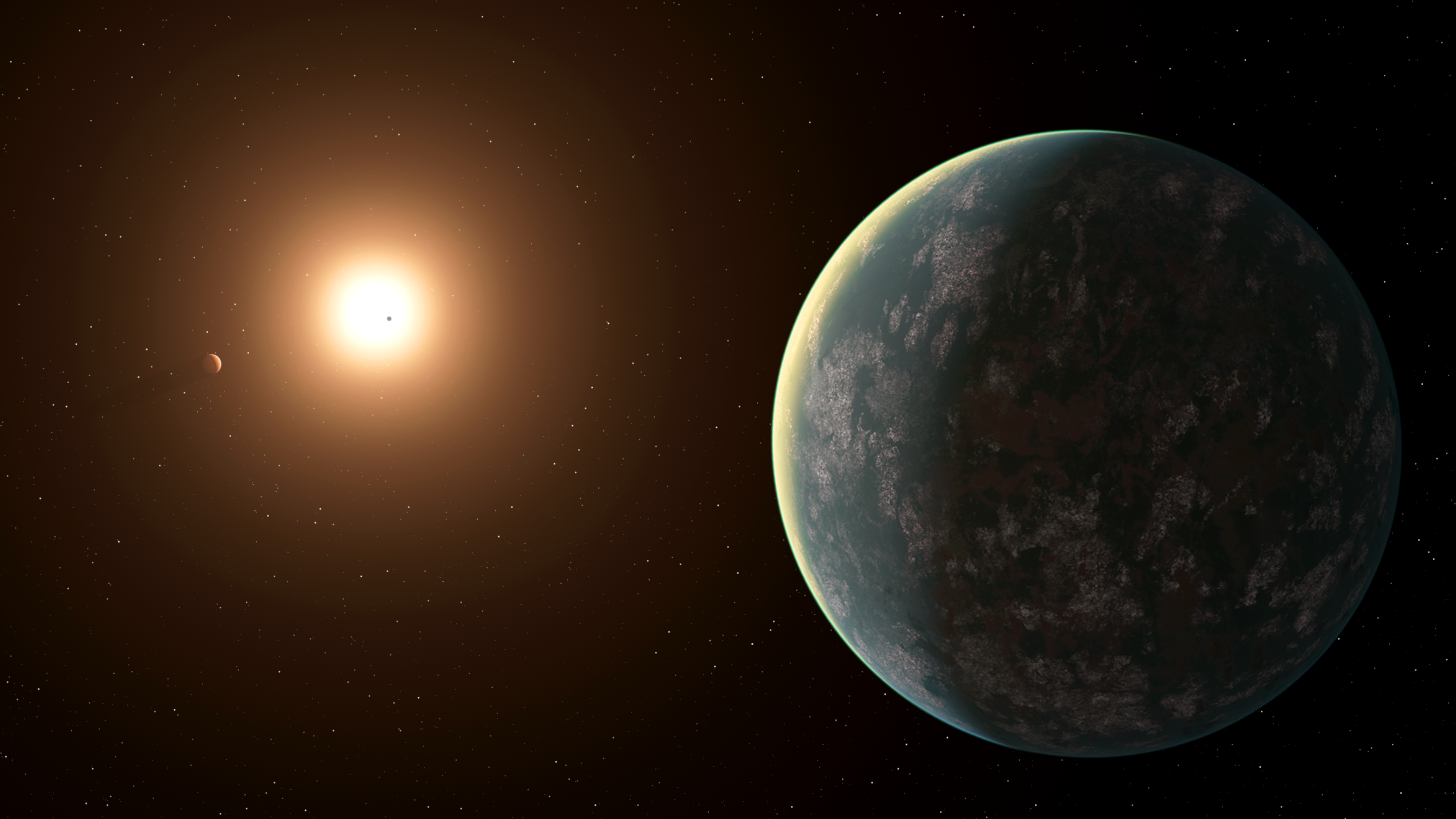
- Artist concept of the GJ 357 system. Credit: Jack Madden

Observation data Epoch J2000 Equinox ICRS
- Constellation: Hydra
- Right ascension: 09^{h} 36^{m} 01.63722^{s}
- Declination: −21° 39′ 38.8776″
- Apparent magnitude (V): 10.906

Characteristics
- Evolutionary stage: Main sequence
- Spectral type: M2.5V

Astrometry
| Radial velocity (R_{v}) | −35.03±0.17 km/s |
| Proper motion (μ) | RA: 138.722(23) mas/yr Dec.: −990.342(20) mas/yr |
| Parallax (π) | 105.9789±0.0227 mas |
| Distance | 30.776 ± 0.007 ly (9.436 ± 0.002 pc) |
| Absolute magnitude (M_{V}) | +11.13 |

Details
| Mass | 0.3455+0.0078 −0.0077 M_{☉} |
| Radius | 0.3382+0.0093 −0.0087 R_{☉} |
| Luminosity | 0.01621+0.00056 −0.00055 L_{☉} |
| Surface gravity (log g) | 4.918+0.024 −0.025 cgs |
| Temperature | 3,540±51 K |
| Metallicity [Fe/H] | −0.50+0.22 −0.21 dex |
| Rotation | 74.3±1.7 d |
| Rotational velocity (v sin i) | 2.5 km/s |

Other designations
- HIP 47103, TOI-562, 2MASS 09360161-2139371

Database references
| SIMBAD | data |
| Exoplanet Archive | data |
| ARICNS | data |

GJ 357 (Gliese 357) is a red dwarf star with an unusually low starspot activity. It is located 31 light-years from Earth, in the constellation Hydra.

== Planetary system ==
The star has three confirmed exoplanets in its orbit. One of these, GJ 357 d, is considered to be a super-Earth within the circumstellar habitable zone.

Transmission spectroscopy of the planet b with JWST in 2025 found no clear evidence for atmospheric molecules, although a secondary atmosphere is considered likely to exist. Similarly, another 2025 analysis of the JWST transmission spectrum found no atmospheric molecules, but was able to rule out an atmosphere composed mainly of low-molar mass molecules (less than 8 g/mol) and an abundance of metals less than 300 times that of the Sun. A 2026 study found dayside temperature of 923+39
−38 K (649.9 ± 39.0 °C; 1,201.7 ± 70.2 °F) for the planet, which is considered anomalously high compared to previous predictions. The data is inconsistent with the predictions for an airless rock with an albedo of zero, and with several atmospheric compositions with high mean molar mass. Hot spots, untested atmospheric conditions, and wavelength-dependent surface emissivity could explain the anomalously high temperature.

The Gliese 357 planetary system
| Companion (in order from star) | Mass | Semimajor axis (AU) | Orbital period (days) | Eccentricity | Inclination (°) | Radius |
|---|---|---|---|---|---|---|
| b | 2.05±0.43 M_{🜨} | 0.03420+0.00025 −0.00026 | 3.93060494+0.00000062 −0.00000058 | 0.047+0.032 −0.030 | 89.11+0.33 −0.22 | 1.152+0.034 −0.032 R_{🜨} |
| c | ≥3.51±0.57 M_{🜨} | 0.061±0.004 | 9.1253+0.0015 −0.0013 | 0.115+0.120 −0.081 | — | — |
| d | ≥6.7±1.1 M_{🜨} | 0.2001±0.0015 | 55.606+0.062 −0.053 | 0.18+0.17 −0.12 | — | — |
