= LTT 3780 =

Star system in the constellation Hydra

Observation data Epoch J2000 Equinox ICRS
- Constellation: Hydra
- Right ascension: 10^{h} 18^{m} 35.137^{s}
- Declination: −11° 43′ 00.24″
- Apparent magnitude (V): 13.07±0.015

Characteristics
- Spectral type: M3.5 V + M5.0 V
- Apparent magnitude (B): 14.678
- Apparent magnitude (G): 11.8465±0.0005
- Apparent magnitude (J): 9.007±0.030

Astrometry
Radial velocity (R_{v})	0.27±0.34 km/s
Proper motion (μ)	RA: −341.537 mas/yr Dec.: −247.747 mas/yr
Parallax (π)	45.3972±0.0301 mas
Distance	71.85 ± 0.05 ly (22.03 ± 0.01 pc)
Absolute magnitude (M_{V})	11.36±0.02

Position (relative to LTT 3780)
Component	LP 729-55
Epoch of observation	J2015.5
Angular distance	15.81±0.150″
Position angle	96.9±0.2°
Projected separation	348±3 AU

Details

LTT 3780
Mass	0.363±0.008 M_{☉}
Radius	0.375±0.011 R_{☉}
Luminosity	0.0165±0.0021 L_{☉}
Surface gravity (log g)	4.85±0.03 cgs
Temperature	3,358±92 K
Metallicity [Fe/H]	0.06±0.14 dex
Rotation	104±15
Rotational velocity (v sin i)	< 1.3 km/s
Age	3.10+6.20 −0.98 Gyr

LP 729-55
Mass	0.136±0.004 M_{☉}
Radius	0.173±0.005 R_{☉}

Other designations
- G 162-44, LP 729-54, LTT 3780, NLTT 23974, 2MASS J10183516-1142599

Database references
SIMBAD	data
Exoplanet Archive	data

LTT 3780, also known as TOI-732 or LP 729-54, is the brighter component of a wide visual binary star system in the constellation Hydra. This star is host to a pair of orbiting exoplanets. Based on parallax measurements, it is located at a distance of 72 light years from the Sun. LTT 3780 has an apparent visual magnitude of 13.07, requiring a telescope to view.

The spectrum of LTT 3780 presents as a small M-type main-sequence star, a red dwarf, with a stellar classification of M3.5 V. It is spinning very slowly, with a rotation period of 104 days. The abundance of iron, an indicator of the star's metallicity, appears higher than in the Sun. The star is inactive, showing a negligible level of magnetic activity in its chromosphere. It has about 40% of the mass and 37% of the radius of the Sun. The star is radiating just 17% of the Sun's luminosity from its photosphere at an effective temperature of 3,331.

Collectively designated LDS 3977, the two stars in this system share a common proper motion and have an angular separation of 15.8″, which corresponds to a (physical) projected separation of 348 AU. At this separation, the orbital period would be ~9,100 years. The fainter member is a red dwarf with a class of M5.0 V. It has 14% of the mass of the Sun and 17% of the Sun's radius.

== Planetary system ==
In 2020, an analysis carried out by a team of astronomers led by astronomer Ryan Cloutier of the TESS project confirmed the existence of two planets on mildly eccentric orbits, the inner being a super-Earth and the outer a small gas planet about half the mass of Uranus.

=== LTT 3780 b ===
The inner planet, LTT 3780 b, is an ultra-short period rocky super-Earth. James Webb Space Telescope observations published in 2025 are consistent with the planet being a bare rock with no atmosphere; CO_{2} atmospheres with a surface pressure of at least 0.01 bar can be ruled out.

=== LTT 3780 c ===
Astronomers utilizing the Gemini South 8.1-meter telescope performed an atmospheric survey of LTT 3780 c through high-resolution transmission spectroscopy. From observations during a single transit, they detected tentative signs of methane in the atmosphere but found no traces of ammonia, even though it is highly detectable in a cloud-free, hydrogen-rich atmosphere. A later study with JWST found stronger evidence for methane along with moderate to strong signs of either heavier hydrocarbons or sulfur-bearing molecules. This study also put constraints on the atmospheric abundance of water vapor, CO and CO_{2}.

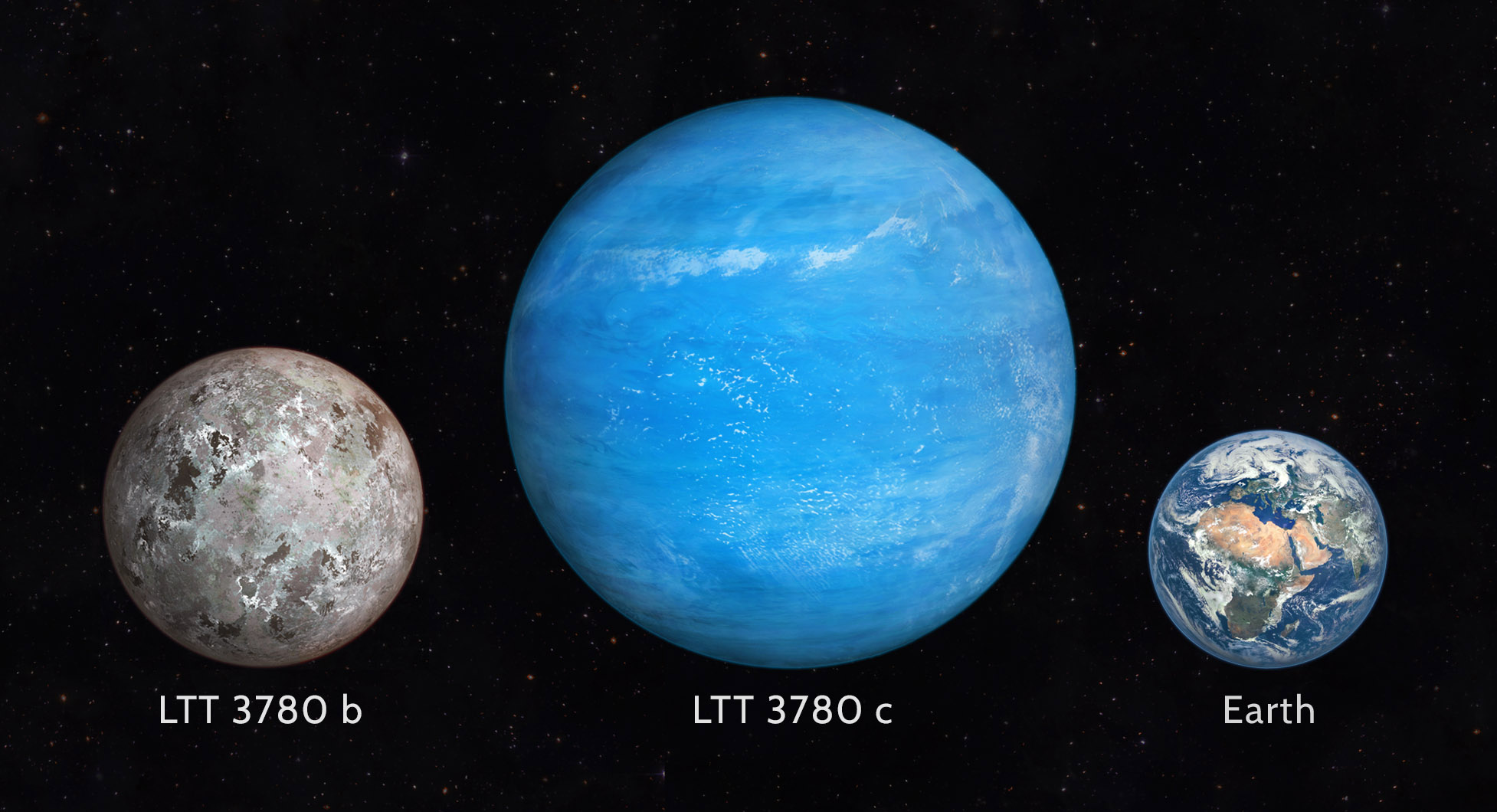
Size comparison of the two known planets of LTT 3780 (artistic concept) with Earth

The LTT 3780 planetary system
Companion (in order from star)	Mass	Semimajor axis (AU)	Orbital period (days)	Eccentricity	Inclination (°)	Radius
b	2.34±0.10 M_{🜨}	0.01195+0.00028 −0.00029	0.7683793(4)	0	86.10+0.92 −0.68	1.31±0.05 R_{🜨}
c	7.89±0.26 M_{🜨}	0.0757±0.0018	12.252284(13)	0.024+0.032 −0.017	88.958+0.074 −0.068	2.39+0.10 −0.11 R_{🜨}

== See also ==
- List of extrasolar planets
- List of multiplanetary systems
