= GJ 3512 =

Star in the constellation of Ursa Major

Observation data Epoch J2000.0 Equinox ICRS
- Constellation: Ursa Major
- Right ascension: 08^{h} 41^{m} 20.12866^{s}
- Declination: +59° 29′ 50.4441″
- Apparent magnitude (V): +15.05

Characteristics
- Evolutionary stage: Main sequence
- Spectral type: dM5.5

Astrometry
Radial velocity (R_{v})	+7.13±2.45 km/s
Proper motion (μ)	RA: −260.276 mas/yr Dec.: −1,279.562 mas/yr
Parallax (π)	105.2935±0.0313 mas
Distance	30.976 ± 0.009 ly (9.497 ± 0.003 pc)

Details
Mass	0.1254±0.0031 M_{☉}
Radius	0.1636±0.0023 R_{☉}
Luminosity	0.001574±0.000018 L_{☉}
Surface gravity (log g)	5.240±0.044 cgs
Temperature	3,081±51 K
Metallicity [Fe/H]	−0.07±0.16 dex
Rotation	87±5 d
Rotational velocity (v sin i)	2.0 km/s
Age	3–8 Gyr

Other designations
- G 234-45, LHS 252, LP 90-18, 2MASS J08412013+5929505

Database references
SIMBAD	data
Exoplanet Archive	data

GJ 3512 is a nearby star in the northern circumpolar constellation of Ursa Major. It is invisible to the naked eye but can be observed using a telescope, having an apparent visual magnitude of +15.05. The star is located at a distance of 31 light-years from the Sun based on parallax. It has a high proper motion, traversing the celestial sphere at the rate of 1.311″ yr^{−1}. The measurement of the star's radial velocity is poorly constrained, but it appears to be drifting further away at a rate of ~8 km/s.

The stellar classification of GJ 3512 is dM5.5, which determines this to be a small red dwarf star that is generating energy through core hydrogen fusion. It displays a moderate amount of magnetic activity with a Sun-like cycle lasting 14 years. A low-level variability lasting ~87 d matches the approximate rotation period. The star has 12.5% of the mass of the Sun and 16% of the Sun's radius. It is radiating 1.6% of the luminosity of the Sun from its photosphere at an effective temperature of 3,081 K.

== Planetary system ==
A gas giant planet in an eccentric orbit around GJ 3512 was discovered in 2019 utilizing the radial velocity method. The star's mass is only 250 times that of the gas giant, calling into question traditional models of planetary formation. If the star was born in an open cluster, this planet may instead have formed around a higher-mass star then been swapped into this system during an interaction. The eccentric orbit of this object may have been caused by the ejection of another exoplanet from the system. A second gas giant planet on a wider, circular orbit is suspected; a 2020 study provided stronger evidence for this planet, and it is now considered confirmed by most sources.

The GJ 3512 planetary system
Companion (in order from star)	Mass	Semimajor axis (AU)	Orbital period (days)	Eccentricity	Inclination (°)	Radius
b	≥0.461±0.023 M_{J}	0.3376+0.0082 −0.0084	203.109+0.035 −0.034	0.4279+0.0036 −0.0035	—	—
c	≥0.453±0.023 M_{J}	1.731+0.043 −0.046	2,354+36 −30	0.089±0.012	—	—

== See also ==
- List of star systems within 30–35 light-years
