= Ross 128 =

Small star in constellation of Virgo

- Location of Ross 128 in the constellation Virgo

Observation data Epoch J2000 Equinox ICRS
- Constellation: Virgo
- Right ascension: 11^{h} 47^{m} 44.39727^{s}
- Declination: +00° 48′ 16.4003″
- Apparent magnitude (V): 11.13

Characteristics
- Evolutionary stage: Main sequence
- Spectral type: M4V
- U−B color index: +2.685
- B−V color index: +1.59
- Variable type: Flare star

Astrometry
Radial velocity (R_{v})	−31.0 km/s
Proper motion (μ)	RA: +607.299(34) mas/yr Dec.: −1223.028(23) mas/yr
Parallax (π)	296.3053±0.0302 mas
Distance	11.007 ± 0.001 ly (3.3749 ± 0.0003 pc)
Absolute magnitude (M_{V})	13.53

Details
Mass	0.176±0.004 M_{☉}
Radius	0.198±0.007 R_{☉}
Luminosity (bolometric)	0.00366 ± 0.00005 L_{☉}
Surface gravity (log g)	3.40 cgs
Temperature	3,189+55 −53 K
Metallicity [Fe/H]	−0.02±0.08 dex
Rotation	101–223 days
Rotational velocity (v sin i)	2.1±1.0 km/s
Age	5.0 Gyr

Other designations
- FI Vir, GJ 447, HIP 57548, G 10-50, LFT 852, LHS 315, LSPM J1147+0048, LTT 13240, PLX 2730, Ross 128, Vyssotsky 286

Database references
SIMBAD	data
Exoplanet Archive	data

Ross 128 is a red dwarf star in the equatorial zodiac constellation of Virgo, near β Virginis. The apparent magnitude of Ross 128 is 11.13, which is too faint to be seen with the unaided eye. Based upon parallax measurements, the distance of this star from Earth is 11.007 light-years (3.375 parsecs), making it the twelfth closest stellar system to the Solar System. It was first cataloged in 1926 by American astronomer Frank Elmore Ross. It is the nearest star in Virgo, and so is occasionally called "Proxima Virginis" by analogy with Proxima Centauri.

== Properties ==
Distances of the nearest stars from 20,000 years ago until 80,000 years in the future

This low-mass star has a stellar classification of M4 V, which places it among the category of stars known as red dwarfs. It has about 18% of the mass of the Sun and 20% of the Sun's radius, but generates energy so slowly that it has only 0.033% of the Sun's visible luminosity; however, most of the energy being radiated by the star is in the infrared band, with the bolometric luminosity being equal to 0.37% of solar. This energy is being radiated from the star's outer atmosphere at an effective temperature of 3,180 K. This gives it the cool orange-red glow of an M-type star.

Ross 128 is an old disk star, which means it has a low abundance of elements other than hydrogen and helium, what astronomers term the star's metallicity, and it orbits near the plane of the Milky Way galaxy. The star lacks a strong excess of infrared radiation. An infrared excess is usually an indicator of a dust ring in orbit around the star.

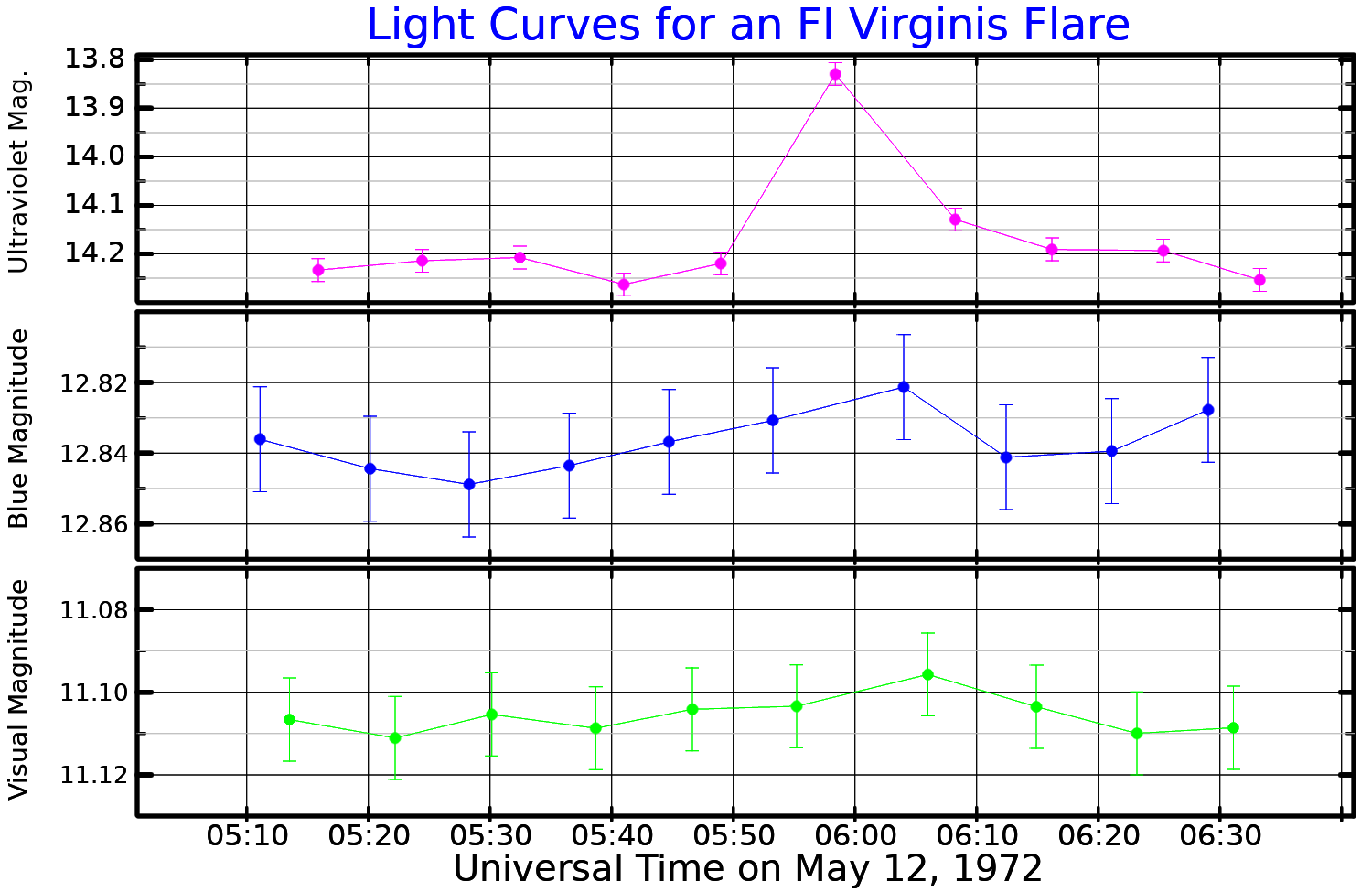
Light curves for a flare on FI Virginis, seen in ultraviolet, blue and visual band light, adapted from Lee and Hoxie (1972),

In 1972, a flare was detected from Ross 128. It was observed to increase in brightness by about half a magnitude in the ultraviolet U band, returning to normal brightness in less than an hour. At optical wavelengths, the brightness changes were almost undetectable. It was classified as a flare star and given the variable star designation FI Virginis. Because of the low rate of flare activity, it is thought to be a magnetically evolved star. That is, there is some evidence that the magnetic braking of the star's stellar wind has lowered the frequency of flares, but not the net yield.

Brightness variations thought to be due to rotation of the star and magnetic cycles similar to the sunspot cycle have also been detected. These cause changes of just a few thousandths of a magnitude. The rotation period is found to be 165.1 days, and the magnetic cycle length 4.1 years.

Ross 128 is orbiting through the galaxy with an eccentricity of 0.122, causing its distance from the Galactic Center to range between 26.8–34.2 kly (8.2–10.5 kpc). This orbit will bring the star closer to the Solar System in the future. The nearest approach will occur in approximately 71,000 years, when it will come within 6.233 ± 0.085 ly (1.911 ± 0.026 pc).

== Planetary system ==
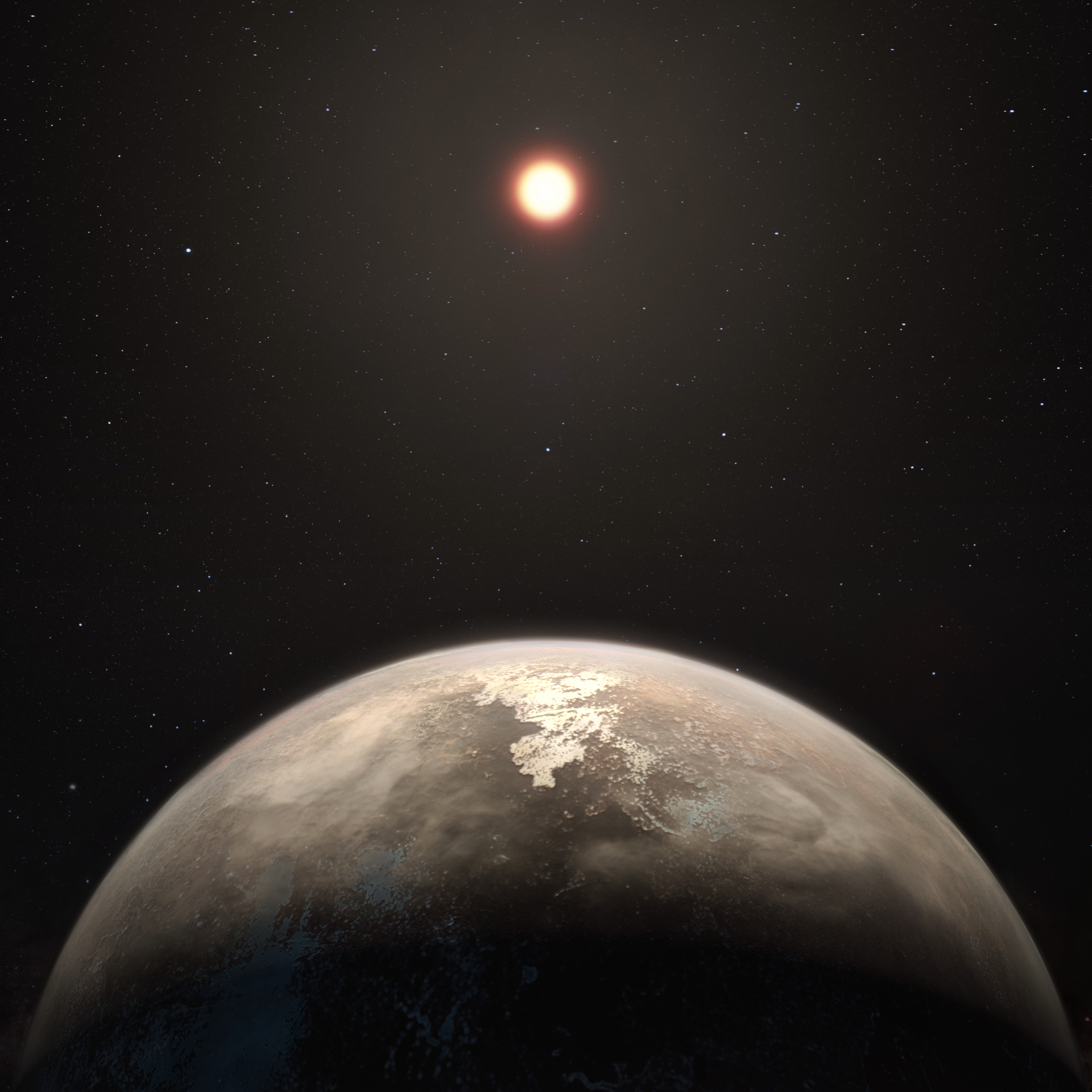
Artist's impression of the planet Ross 128 b, with the star Ross 128 visible in the background

Ross 128 b was discovered in July 2017 by the HARPS instrument at the La Silla Observatory in Chile, by measuring changes in radial velocity of the host star. Its existence was confirmed on 15 November 2017. It is the second-closest known Earth-size exoplanet, after Proxima b. Ross 128 b has a minimum mass 1.4 times that of Earth; a 2019 study predicts a true mass about 1.8 times Earth and a radius about 1.6 times that of the Earth, with large margins of error. It orbits 20 times closer to its star than Earth orbits the Sun, intercepting only about 1.38 times more solar radiation than Earth, increasing the chance of retaining an atmosphere over a geological timescale. Ross 128 b is a closely orbiting planet, with a year (orbital period) lasting about 9.9 days. At that close distance from its host star, the planet is most likely tidally locked, meaning that one side of the planet would have eternal daylight and the other would be in darkness. Near-infrared high-resolution spectra from APOGEE have demonstrated that Ross 128 has near solar metallicity; Ross 128 b therefore most likely contains rock and iron. Furthermore, recent models generated with these data support the conclusion that Ross 128 b is a "temperate exoplanet in the inner edge of the habitable zone."

The Ross 128 planetary system
Companion (in order from star)	Mass	Semimajor axis (AU)	Orbital period (days)	Eccentricity	Inclination (°)	Radius
b	≥1.40±0.13 M_{🜨}	0.049640±0.000004	9.8556+0.0012 −0.0011	0.21+0.09 −0.10	—	~1.6+1.1 −0.65 R_{🜨}

A 2024 study of the radial velocity data found an eccentricity of about 0.21 for Ross 128 b, higher than previous estimates and similar to that of Mercury. Given the planet's orbit near the inner edge of the habitable zone, such a high eccentricity would significantly decrease its potential for habitability. This study also searched for additional planets in the system, and did not find any.

== Radio signals ==
In the spring of 2017, Arecibo astronomers detected strange radio signals thought to originate from Ross 128 that were unlike any they had seen before. SETI's Allen Telescope Array was used for follow-up observations and was unable to detect the signal but did detect man made interference, making it seem clear that the Arecibo detections were due to transmissions from Earth satellites in geosynchronous orbit. Ross 128 has a declination (a coordinate which can be likened to latitude) of close to 0 degrees, which places it in the thick of a phalanx of these satellites. Therefore, it can be concluded that the signal was most likely a result of man-made interference.

== See also ==
- List of nearest stars and brown dwarfs
- PSR B1919+21 – pulsar mistaken for an alien radio signal (LGM-1)
