= List of nearest exoplanets =

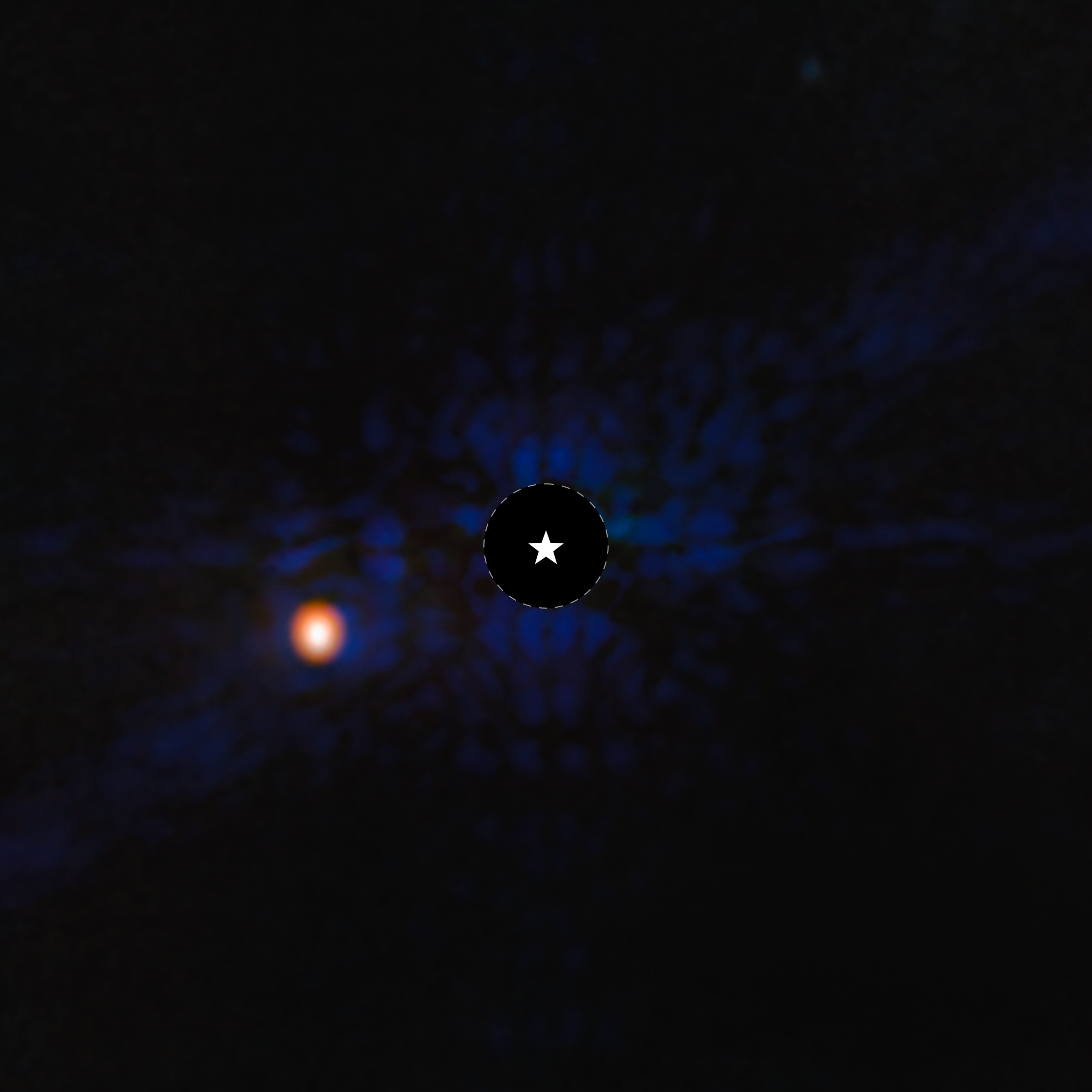
Epsilon Indi Ab, 12 light-years away, with its parent star Epsilon Indi A blacked out, as pictured by JWST in 2023

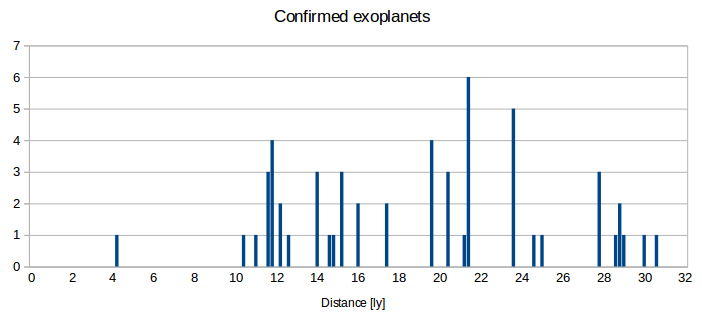
Distribution of nearest known exoplanets as of March 2018

There are 6,534 known exoplanets, or planets outside the Solar System that orbit a star, brown dwarf or stellar remnant, as of October 8, 2026; only a small fraction of these are located in the vicinity of the Solar System. Within 10 parsecs (32.6 light-years), there are 106 exoplanets listed as confirmed by the NASA Exoplanet Archive. (Note: Listed values are primarily taken from NASA Exoplanet Archive, but other databases include a few additional exoplanet entries tagged as "Confirmed" that have yet to be compiled into the NASA archive. Such databases include: "Exoplanet Catalog". Extrasolar Planets Encyclopaedia. 1995. Full table. "Exoplanets Data Explorer". Exoplanet Orbit Database. California Planet Survey. Click the "+" button to visualize additional parameters. "Open Exoplanet Catalogue". Click the "Show options" to visualize additional parameters. Archived from the original on 2017-09-02.) Among the over 500 known stars and brown dwarfs within 10 parsecs, (Note: For reference, the 100th closest known star system in April 2021 was EQ Pegasi (20.4 ly).) around 60 have been confirmed to have planetary systems; 51 stars in this range are visible to the naked eye, (Note: According to the Bortle scale, an astronomical object is visible to the naked eye under "typical" dark-sky conditions in a rural area if it has an apparent magnitude smaller than +6.5. To the unaided eye, the limiting magnitude is +7.6 to +8.0 under "excellent" dark-sky conditions (with effort).) eight of which have planetary systems.

The first report of an exoplanet within this range was in 1998 for a planet orbiting around Gliese 876 (15.3 light-years (ly) away), and the latest as of 2026 is a system around GJ 3378 (25.2 ly). The closest exoplanets are those found orbiting the star closest to the Solar System, which is Proxima Centauri 4.25 light-years away. The first confirmed exoplanet discovered in the Proxima Centauri system was Proxima Centauri b, in 2016. HD 219134 (21.6 ly) has five confirmed exoplanets, the highest number discovered for any star within this range.

Most known nearby exoplanets orbit close to their stars. A majority are significantly larger than Earth, but a few have similar masses, including planets around YZ Ceti, Gliese 367, Proxima Centauri, and Barnard's Star which may be less massive than Earth. Several confirmed exoplanets are hypothesized to be potentially habitable, with Proxima Centauri b and GJ 1002 b (15.8 ly) considered among the most likely candidates. The International Astronomical Union has assigned proper names to some known extrasolar bodies, including nearby exoplanets, through the NameExoWorlds project. Planets named in the 2015 event include the planets around Epsilon Eridani (10.5 ly) and Fomalhaut, (Note: The star Epsilon Eridani was named Ran (after Rán, the Norse goddess of the sea), and the planet Epsilon Eridani b was named AEgir (after Ægir, Rán's husband), while the planet Fomalhaut b was named Dagon (after Dagon, an ancient Syrian “fish god”).) while planets named in the 2022 event include those around Gliese 436, Gliese 486, and Gliese 367.

== Exoplanets within 10 parsecs ==
Key to colors
^{°}	Mercury, Earth and Jupiter (for comparison purposes)
^{#}	Confirmed multiplanetary systems
^{↑}	Exoplanets believed to be potentially habitable

Confirmed exoplanets
Host star system				Companion exoplanet (in order from star)									Notes and additional planetary observations
Name	Distance (ly)	Apparent magnitude (V)	Mass (M_{☉})	Label (Note: Exoplanet naming convention assigns uncapitalized letters starting from b to each planet based on chronological order of their initial report, and in increasing order of distance from the parent star for planets reported at the same time. Omitted letters signify planets that have yet to be confirmed, or planets that have been retracted altogether.)	Mass (M_{🜨}) (Note: Most reported exoplanet masses have very large error margins (typically, between 10% and 30%). The mass of an exoplanet has generally been inferred from measurements on changes in the radial velocity of the host star, but this kind of measurement only allows for an estimate on the exoplanet's orbital parameters, but not on their orbital inclination (i). As such, most exoplanets only have an estimated minimum mass (M_{real}*sin(i)), where their true masses are statistically expected to come close to this minimum, with only about 13% chance for the mass of an exoplanet to be more than double its minimum mass.)	Radius (R_{🜨})	Semi-major axis (AU)	Orbital period (days)	Eccentricity	Inclination (°)	Discovery method	Discovery year	Notes and additional planetary observations
Sun^{°}	0.000016	−26.7	1	Mercury	0.055	0.3829	0.387	88.0	0.205	3.38	—	—	For comparison purposes. One candidate planet
Sun^{°}	0.000016	−26.7	1	Earth	1	1	1	365.3	0.0167	7.25	—	—	For comparison purposes. One candidate planet
Sun^{°}	0.000016	−26.7	1	Jupiter	317.8	10.973	5.20	4,333	0.0488	6.09	—	—	For comparison purposes. One candidate planet
Proxima Centauri^{#}	4.2465	11.13	0.123	d	≥0.26	~0.81 ± 0.08	0.0289	5.122	0.04	—	RV	2025	one disputed candidate (c)
Proxima Centauri^{#}	4.2465	11.13	0.123	b^{↑}	≥1.055	0.94–1.4	0.0486	11.19	0.02	—	RV	2016	one disputed candidate (c)
Barnard's Star^{#}	5.9629	9.51	0.162	d	≥0.26	—	0.0188	2.340	0.04	—	RV	2025	
Barnard's Star^{#}	5.9629	9.51	0.162	b	≥0.30	—	0.0229	3.154	0.03	—	RV	2024	
Barnard's Star^{#}	5.9629	9.51	0.162	c	≥0.34	—	0.0274	4.124	0.08	—	RV	2025	
Barnard's Star^{#}	5.9629	9.51	0.162	e	≥0.19	—	0.0381	6.739	0.04	—	RV	2025	
Lalande 21185^{#}	8.304	7.52	0.46	b	≥2.69	—	0.0788	12.94	0.06	—	RV	2019	1 candidate
Lalande 21185^{#}	8.304	7.52	0.46	c	≥13.6	—	2.94	2,946	0.13	—	RV	2021	1 candidate
Epsilon Eridani	10.501	3.73	0.82	Ægir	318	—	3.53	2,680	0.06	40	RV	2000	1 inferred planet, 1 or possibly 2 inner debris discs, and an outer disc
Gliese 887^{#}	10.724	7.34	0.489	e	≥1.46	—	0.042	4.42	–	—	RV	2026	2 candidates
Gliese 887^{#}	10.724	7.34	0.489	b	≥3.9	—	0.068	9.262	0.14	—	RV	2019	2 candidates
Gliese 887^{#}	10.724	7.34	0.489	c	≥6.5	—	0.121	21.78	0.17	—	RV	2019	2 candidates
Gliese 887^{#}	10.724	7.34	0.489	d^{↑}	≥6.1	—	0.212	50.77	0.25	—	RV	2026	2 candidates
Ross 128	11.007	11.1	0.168	b^{↑}	≥1.40	—	0.0496	9.866	0.12	—	RV	2017	
Gliese 725 A	11.491	8.94	0.330	b	≥2.78	—	0.068	11.2201	0.0	—	RV	2024	
Gliese 725 B	11.491	9.70	0.25	c^{↑}	≥3.4	—	0.139	37.9	–	—	RV	2025	
Groombridge 34 A^{#}	11.619	8.1	0.38	b	≥3.03	—	0.072	11.44	0.09	~54?	RV	2014	
Groombridge 34 A^{#}	11.619	8.1	0.38	c	≥36	—	5.4	7,600	0.27	~54?	RV	2018	
Epsilon Indi A	11.867	4.83	0.762	b	2005	—	28.4	63,400	0.40	103.7	RV	2018	nearest exoplanet directly imaged
GJ 1061^{#}	11.984	7.52	0.113	b	1.11	—	0.021	3.207	0.05	77	RV	2019	two solutions for d's orbit
GJ 1061^{#}	11.984	7.52	0.113	c^{↑}	1.81	—	0.0342	6.682	0.02	77	RV	2019	two solutions for d's orbit
GJ 1061^{#}	11.984	7.52	0.113	d^{↑}	1.67	—	0.054	13.06	0.04	77	RV	2019	two solutions for d's orbit
YZ Ceti^{#}	12.122	12.1	0.130	b	≥0.70	—	0.0163	2.021	0.06	—	RV	2017	
YZ Ceti^{#}	12.122	12.1	0.130	c	≥1.14	—	0.0216	3.060	0.0	—	RV	2017	
YZ Ceti^{#}	12.122	12.1	0.130	d	≥1.09	—	0.0285	4.656	0.07	—	RV	2017	
Luyten's Star^{#}	12.348	11.94	0.29	c	≥1.18	—	0.0365	4.723	0.10	—	RV	2017	2 candidates
Luyten's Star^{#}	12.348	11.94	0.29	b^{↑}	≥2.89	—	0.0911	18.65	0.17	—	RV	2017	2 candidates
Teegarden's Star^{#}	12.497	15.40	0.08	b^{↑}	≥1.16	—	0.0259	4.906	0.03	—	RV	2019	
Teegarden's Star^{#}	12.497	15.40	0.08	c^{↑}	≥1.05	—	0.0455	11.42	0.04	—	RV	2019	
Teegarden's Star^{#}	12.497	15.40	0.08	d	≥0.82	—	0.0791	26.13	0.07	—	RV	2024	
Wolf 1061^{#}	14.050	10.1	0.25	b	≥1.91	—	0.0375	4.887	0.15	—	RV	2015	
Wolf 1061^{#}	14.050	10.1	0.25	c^{↑}	≥3.41	—	0.0890	17.87	0.11	—	RV	2015	
Wolf 1061^{#}	14.050	10.1	0.25	d	≥7.7	—	0.470	217	0.55	—	RV	2015	
TZ Arietis	14.578	12.30	0.14	b	≥67	—	0.88	771	0.46	—	RV	2019	2 refuted candidates
Gliese 687^{#}	14.839	9.15	0.41	b	≥17.2	—	0.163	38.14	0.17	—	RV	2014	
Gliese 687^{#}	14.839	9.15	0.41	c	≥16.0	—	1.165	728	0.40	—	RV	2019	
Gliese 674	14.849	9.38	0.35	b	≥11.1	—	0.039	4.694	0.20	—	RV	2007	
Gliese 876^{#}	15.238	10.2	0.33	d	6.68	—	0.0210	1.938	0.04	56.7	RV	2005	
Gliese 876^{#}	15.238	10.2	0.33	c	235	—	0.1309	30.10	0.26	56.7	RV	2000	
Gliese 876^{#}	15.238	10.2	0.33	b	749	—	0.2098	61.10	0.03	56.7	RV	1998	
Gliese 876^{#}	15.238	10.2	0.33	e	16	—	0.3355	123.6	0.05	56.7	RV	2010	
GJ 1002^{#}	15.806	13.84	0.12	b^{↑}	≥1.08	—	0.0457	10.35	—	—	RV	2022	
GJ 1002^{#}	15.806	13.84	0.12	c^{↑}	≥1.36	—	0.0738	21.2	—	—	RV	2022	
Gliese 832	16.200	8.67	0.45	b	315	—	3.7	3,853	0.05	51 or 134	RV	2008	1 refuted candidate
GJ 3323^{#}	17.531	12.2	0.164	b	≥2.0	—	0.0328	5.36	0.2	—	RV	2017	
GJ 3323^{#}	17.531	12.2	0.164	c	≥2.3	—	0.126	40.5	0.2	—	RV	2017	
Gliese 251^{#}	18.215	9.65	0.372	b	≥3.85	—	0.0808	14.2370	—	—	RV	2020	
Gliese 251^{#}	18.215	9.65	0.372	c	≥3.84	—	0.196	53.647	—	—	RV	2025	
Gliese 752 A	19.292	9.13	0.46	b	≥12.2	—	0.343	106	0.10	—	RV	2018	
82 G. Eridani^{#}	19.704	4.26	0.79	b	≥2.15	—	0.126	18.3	0.06	—	RV	2011	1 refuted candidate
82 G. Eridani^{#}	19.704	4.26	0.79	c	≥2.98	—	0.363	89.7	0.08	—	RV	2011	1 refuted candidate
82 G. Eridani^{#}	19.704	4.26	0.79	d^{↑}	≥5.82	—	1.354	648	0.45	—	RV	2024	1 refuted candidate
HN Librae	20.395	11.32	0.29	b^{↑}	≥5.5	—	0.142	36.1	0.08	—	RV	2023	1 candidate
EQ Pegasi A	20.400	10.38	0.436	b	718	—	0.643	284	0.35	69.2	Astrometry	2022	
Gliese 581^{#}	20.549	10.5	0.295	e	2.5	—	0.0280	3.15	0.01	47	RV	2009	3 refuted candidates and a disc
Gliese 581^{#}	20.549	10.5	0.295	b	20.5	—	0.0399	5.37	0.03	47	RV	2005	3 refuted candidates and a disc
Gliese 581^{#}	20.549	10.5	0.295	c	6.8	—	0.0718	12.9	0.03	47	RV	2007	3 refuted candidates and a disc
Gliese 338 B	20.658	7.0	0.64	b	≥10.3	—	0.141	24.5	0.11	—	RV	2020	
Gliese 625	21.131	10.2	0.30	b	≥2.8	—	0.0784	14.6	~0.1	—	RV	2017	
HD 219134^{#}	21.336	5.57	0.78	b	4.7	1.60	0.0388	3.09	~0	85.05	RV	2015	1 candidate (g)
HD 219134^{#}	21.336	5.57	0.78	c	4.4	1.51	0.065	6.77	0.062	87.28	RV	2015	1 candidate (g)
HD 219134^{#}	21.336	5.57	0.78	f	≥7.3	—	0.146	22.7	0.148	~87?	RV	2015	1 candidate (g)
HD 219134^{#}	21.336	5.57	0.78	d	≥16	—	0.237	46.9	0.138	~87?	RV	2015	1 candidate (g)
HD 219134^{#}	21.336	5.57	0.78	h (e)	≥108	—	3.11	2,247	0.06	~87?	RV	2015	1 candidate (g)
LTT 1445 A^{#}	22.387	10.53	0.26	c	1.54	1.15	0.0266	3.12	<0.22	87.43	Transit	2021	1 candidate
LTT 1445 A^{#}	22.387	10.53	0.26	b	2.87	1.30	0.0381	5.36	<0.11	89.68	Transit	2019	1 candidate
Gliese 393	22.953	8.65	0.41	b	≥1.71	—	0.0540	7.03	0.00	—	RV	2019	
GJ 4274^{#}	23.596	13.3	0.18	b	≥2.95	—	0.0153	1.6339	0.003	—	RV	2026	
GJ 4274^{#}	23.596	13.3	0.18	c	≥8.67	—	0.187	69.525	0.01	—	RV	2026	
Gliese 667 C^{#}	23.623	10.2	0.33	b	≥5.4	—	0.049	7.20	0.13	~52?	RV	2009	5 dubious candidates
Gliese 667 C^{#}	23.623	10.2	0.33	c^{↑}	≥3.9	—	0.1251	28.2	0.03	~52?	RV	2011	5 dubious candidates
Gliese 514	24.878	9.03	0.53	b	≥5.2	—	0.421	140	0.45	—	RV	2022	
GJ 3378	25.225	11.774	0.262	b^{↑}	≥2.3	—	0.09673	21.45	0.08	—	RV	2026	
GJ 1151	26.231	14.01	0.164	c	≥10.6	—	0.571	390	—	—	RV	2023	1 refuted candidate
Gliese 486	26.351	11.395	0.32	Su	2.8	1.31	0.0173	1.47	<0.05	88.4	Transit	2021	
Gliese 686	26.613	9.58	0.42	b	≥7.1	—	0.097	15.5	0.04	—	RV	2019	
GJ 1289	27.275	12.67	0.21	b	≥6.3	—	0.27	112	0	—	RV	2024	
61 Virginis^{#}	27.836	4.74	0.95	b	≥6.1	—	0.05	4.22	0.05	~77?	RV	2009	a debris disc
61 Virginis^{#}	27.836	4.74	0.95	c	≥17.9	—	0.22	38.1	0.06	~77?	RV	2009	a debris disc
61 Virginis^{#}	27.836	4.74	0.95	d	≥10.5	—	0.47	123	0.12	~77?	RV	2009	a debris disc
CD Ceti	28.052	14.001	0.161	b	≥3.95	—	0.0185	2.29	0	—	RV	2020	
HD 192310^{#}	28.739	6.13	0.78	b	≥17	—	0.32	75	0.13	—	RV	2010	
HD 192310^{#}	28.739	6.13	0.78	c	≥24	—	1.18	530	~0.3	—	RV	2011	
Gliese 849^{#}	28.750	10.4	0.49	b	≥270	—	2.26	1,910	0.05	—	RV	2006	
Gliese 849^{#}	28.750	10.4	0.49	c	≥300	—	4.82	5,520	0.087	—	RV	2006	
Gliese 433^{#}	29.605	9.79	0.48	b	≥6.0	—	0.062	7.37	0.04	—	RV	2009	
Gliese 433^{#}	29.605	9.79	0.48	d	≥5.2	—	0.178	36.1	0.07	—	RV	2020	
Gliese 433^{#}	29.605	9.79	0.48	c	≥32	—	4.82	5,090	0.12	—	RV	2012	
Gliese 367^{#}	30.719	9.98	0.45	Tahay	0.63	0.70	0.0071	0.322	0.06	79.89	Transit	2021	
Gliese 367^{#}	30.719	9.98	0.45	c	≥4.1	—	0.077	11.5	0.09	~80?	RV	2023	
Gliese 367^{#}	30.719	9.98	0.45	d	≥6.0	—	0.159	34.4	0.14	~80?	RV	2023	
Gliese 357^{#}	30.776	10.9	0.34	b	6.1	1.17	0.035	3.93	0.02	88.92	Transit	2019	
Gliese 357^{#}	30.776	10.9	0.34	c	≥3.6	—	0.061	9.13	0.04	~89?	RV	2019	
Gliese 357^{#}	30.776	10.9	0.34	d^{↑}	≥7.7	—	0.204	55.7	0.03	~89?	RV	2019	
Gliese 176	30.937	10.1	0.45	b	≥8.0	—	0.066	8.77	0.08	—	RV	2007	1 disputed candidate
GJ 3512^{#}	30.976	15.1	0.123	b	≥147	—	0.338	204	0.44	—	RV	2019	
GJ 3512^{#}	30.976	15.1	0.123	c	≥143	—	1.722	2,350	—	—	RV	2020	
G 192-15^{#}	31.075	14.5	0.132	b	≥1.03	—	0.0172	2.275	0	—	RV	2025	
G 192-15^{#}	31.075	14.5	0.132	c	≥14.3	—	1.137	1,219	0.68	—	RV	2025	
Wolf 1069	31.229	13.99	0.167	b^{↑}	≥1.26	—	0.0672	15.56	—	—	RV	2023	
AU Microscopii^{#}	31.683	8.63	0.50	b	6.3	4.38	0.0645	8.463	0.10	89.03	Transit	2020	2 candidates
AU Microscopii^{#}	31.683	8.63	0.50	c	11.3	3.51	0.1101	18.86	0	88.62	Transit	2020	2 candidates
Gliese 436	31.882	10.67	0.41	Awohali	21.4	4.33	0.0280	2.64	0.15	85.8	RV	2004	One dubious candidate (UCF-1.01)
G 268-110	31.888	14.5	0.137	b	≥1.52	—	0.0128	1.433	0	—	RV	2025	
Gliese 49	32.158	8.9	0.57	b	≥5.63	—	0.0905	13.8508	0.363	—	RV	2019	
GJ 3988	32.316	13.6	0.184	b	≥3.7	—	0.0405	6.944	0	—	RV	2023	
HD 260655^{#}	32.608	9.77	0.439	b	2.14	1.240	0.0293	2.780	0.039	87.35	Transit	2022	
HD 260655^{#}	32.608	9.77	0.439	c	3.09	1.533	0.0475	5.706	0.038	87.79	Transit	2022	

== Excluded objects ==
Unlike for bodies within the Solar System, there is no clearly established method for officially recognizing an exoplanet. According to the International Astronomical Union, an exoplanet should be considered confirmed if it has not been disputed for five years after its discovery. There have been examples where the existence of exoplanets has been proposed, but even after follow-up studies their existence is still considered doubtful by some astronomers. Such cases include Wolf 359 (7.9 ly, in 2019), Tau Ceti (11.9 ly, in 2012 & 2017), Gliese 682 (16.3 ly, in 2014), and HD 102365 A (30.4 ly, in 2011). There are also several instances where proposed exoplanets were later disproved by subsequent studies, including candidates around Alpha Centauri B (4.36 ly), Kapteyn's Star (12.8 ly), Van Maanen 2 (14.1 ly), Groombridge 1618 (15.9 ly), AD Leonis (16.2 ly), 40 Eridani A (16.3 ly), 70 Ophiuchi (16.7 ly), Gliese 229 A (18.8 ly), VB 10 (19.3 ly), and Fomalhaut (25.1 ly).

A candidate planet around LHS 288 was proposed in 2007, but it has not been confirmed. In 2021, a candidate planet was detected around Vega, though it has yet to be confirmed. Another candidate planet, Candidate 1, was directly imaged around Alpha Centauri A, though it may also be a clump of asteroids or an artifact of the discovery mechanism. Candidate planets around Luyten 726-8 (8.77 ly), Achird (19.3 ly) and 61 Cygni (11.4 ly) were reported in 2024, 2025 and 2026, respectively.

A planet around Gliese 48 was reported in 2026 and added to the NASA Exoplanet Archive, but the discovery paper was retracted by its author a few months later.

The Working Group on Extrasolar Planets of the International Astronomical Union adopted in 2003 a working definition on the upper limit for what constitutes a planet: not being massive enough to sustain thermonuclear fusion of deuterium. Some studies have calculated this to be somewhere around 13 times the mass of Jupiter, and therefore objects more massive than this are usually classified as brown dwarfs. Some proposed candidate exoplanets have been shown to be massive enough to fall above the threshold, and thus are likely brown dwarfs, as is the case for: SCR 1845-6357 B (13.1 ly), SDSS J1416+1348 B (30.3 ly), and WISE 1217+1626 B (30 ly).

Excluded from the current list are known examples of potential free-floating sub-brown dwarfs, or "rogue planets", which are bodies that are too small to undergo fusion yet they do not revolve around a star. Known such examples include: WISE 0855−0714 (7.4 ly), UGPS 0722-05, (13.4 ly) WISE 1541−2250 (18.6 ly), and SIMP J01365663+0933473 (20.0 ly).

== See also ==
- List of nearest stars
- List of nearest bright stars
- List of nearest terrestrial exoplanet candidates
- Lists of planets
- List of planet types
- List of potentially habitable exoplanets
- Lists of astronomical objects
