= CD Ceti =

Star in the constellation Cetus

Observation data Epoch J2000.0 Equinox ICRS
- Constellation: Cetus
- Right ascension: 03^{h} 13^{m} 22.92^{s}
- Declination: +04° 46′ 29.3″
- Apparent magnitude (V): +13.81 to 13.87

Characteristics
- Spectral type: M5.0V
- Variable type: BY Dra

Astrometry
Radial velocity (R_{v})	+28.16±0.46 km/s
Proper motion (μ)	RA: +1741.875 mas/yr Dec.: +86.494 mas/yr
Parallax (π)	116.2678±0.0427 mas
Distance	28.05 ± 0.01 ly (8.601 ± 0.003 pc)

Details
Mass	0.161±0.010 M_{☉}
Radius	0.175±0.006 R_{☉}
Luminosity	0.002934(53) L_{☉}
Surface gravity (log g)	4.93±0.04 cgs
Temperature	3,130±51 K
Metallicity [Fe/H]	+0.13±0.16 dex
Rotation	126.2 days
Rotational velocity (v sin i)	≤2.0 km/s
Age	1–5 Gyr

Other designations
- CD Cet, GJ 1057, G 77-31, LHS 168, NLTT 10256

Database references
SIMBAD	data
Exoplanet Archive	data

CD Ceti (CD Cet) is a star located in the constellation of Cetus. With an apparent magnitude of +13.8, it is not visible to the naked eye. Based on its parallax, it is located 8.6 parsecs (28 light-years) from the Solar System.

== Characteristics ==
CD Ceti is a faint red dwarf of spectral type M5.0V. Similar to GJ 1156 or the well-known Proxima Centauri - the nearest star to the Solar System - it has an effective temperature of 3,240 K.

Small in size, its radius is 18% of the solar radius, and it rotates with a projected rotational velocity of less than 3 km/s.

Its rotation period is approximately 126.2 days, as determined from MEarth photometry. Its weak stellar magnetic field, below 2 kG, is associated with its slow rotation. It has a mass equal to 15.5-16% of the solar mass.

CD Ceti is a relatively quiet star, with a low chromospheric activity level and no detected Hα emission. High-resolution imaging searches found no stellar or substellar companions, confirming that CD Ceti is a single star.

CD Ceti is classified as a BY Draconis variable. These variables - among which DK Ceti and EX Ceti are found in the same constellation - show variations in luminosity due to spots on their surface or other types of chromospheric activity. The brightness variation of CD Ceti is 0.06 magnitudes, with no known period.

== Planetary system ==
In 2020, the CARMENES spectrograph detected a super-Earth companion, CD Cet b, orbiting the star. The planet has a minimum mass of approximately 4.0 ± 0.4 M⊕ and completes one orbit every 2.29 days. The signal was detected independently in both the visible and near-infrared channels of CARMENES and subsequently confirmed with the ESPRESSO spectrograph at the Very Large Telescope. No transit was detected in TESS photometry, indicating that the planet does not transit its host star as seen from Earth. Depending on its Bond albedo, the planet's equilibrium temperature is estimated to range from approximately 325 to 464 K.

The CD Ceti planetary system
Companion (in order from star)	Mass	Semimajor axis (AU)	Orbital period (days)	Eccentricity	Inclination (°)	Radius
b	≥3.95+0.42 −0.43 M_{🜨}	0.0185±0.0013	2.29070±0.00012	—	—	—
