= GJ 3378 =

Red dwarf star in the constellation Camelopardalis

Observation data Epoch J2000.0 Equinox ICRS
- Constellation: Camelopardalis
- Right ascension: 06^{h} 01^{m} 11.04551^{s}
- Declination: +59° 35′ 49.8841″
- Apparent magnitude (V): 11.74

Characteristics
- Evolutionary stage: Main sequence
- Spectral type: M4.0V

Astrometry
Radial velocity (R_{v})	+1.78±0.22 km/s
Proper motion (μ)	RA: −104.942 mas/yr Dec.: −928.628 mas/yr
Parallax (π)	129.3014±0.0283 mas
Distance	25.225 ± 0.006 ly (7.734 ± 0.002 pc)

Details
Mass	0.262±0.021 M_{☉}
Radius	0.275±0.009 R_{☉}
Luminosity	0.0085±0.0008 L_{☉}
Surface gravity (log g)	4.97±0.06 cgs
Temperature	3340±60 K
Metallicity [Fe/H]	−0.09±0.08 dex
Rotation	95.1±2.3 d (83.8 d?)
Rotational velocity (v sin i)	2.62±0.26 km/s

Other designations
- GJ 3378, G 192-13, L 1813-21, LFT 443, LHS 1805, LP 86-137, LSPM J0601+5935, LTT 11755, NLTT 15885, PLX 1373.01, PM J06011+5935, TIC 322347050, 2MASS J06011106+5935508, WISEA J060110.89+593540.3

Database references
SIMBAD	data
Exoplanet Archive	data
ARICNS	data

GJ 3378, also known as LHS 1805, is a red dwarf star located around 25.2 light years (7.73 parsecs) away from Earth in the northern constellation of Camelopardalis. It is a small star with a mass of 0.3 solar masses and a radius of 0.3 solar radii. It is also a cool and quiet star with an effective temperature of 3,340 K and a luminosity of 0.9% solar luminosity.

As of 2026, only one exoplanet, a super-Earth known as GJ 3378b, has been discovered orbiting within the conservative habitable zone. While it is likely that this planet has a terrestrial composition, it is placed near the cosmic shoreline meaning that it is potentially subjected to its parent star stripping away its atmosphere.

== Characteristics ==
GJ 3378 has a mass of about 0.26±0.02 solar masses and a radius of 0.279±0.005 solar radii. It has a luminosity of 2.1 solar luminosity and an effective temperature of 3,378±30 K. It was measured to have an average density of 17.7 g/cm^{3}. It was initially given a rotational period of 95.1±2.3 days however Sabotta et al. (2021) reported a slower rotational period of 83.4 days. It has a metallicity that is close to the solar value, with an M/H dex of −0.10±0.10. The magnetic field of GJ 3378 has been clearly detected. It is small-scaled and has a mean strength of 150±50 Gauss (unit), making it a very quiet and cool star. Because GJ 3378 is a star with a mass lower than 0.35 solar masses, it is a fully-convective star.

== Planetary system ==
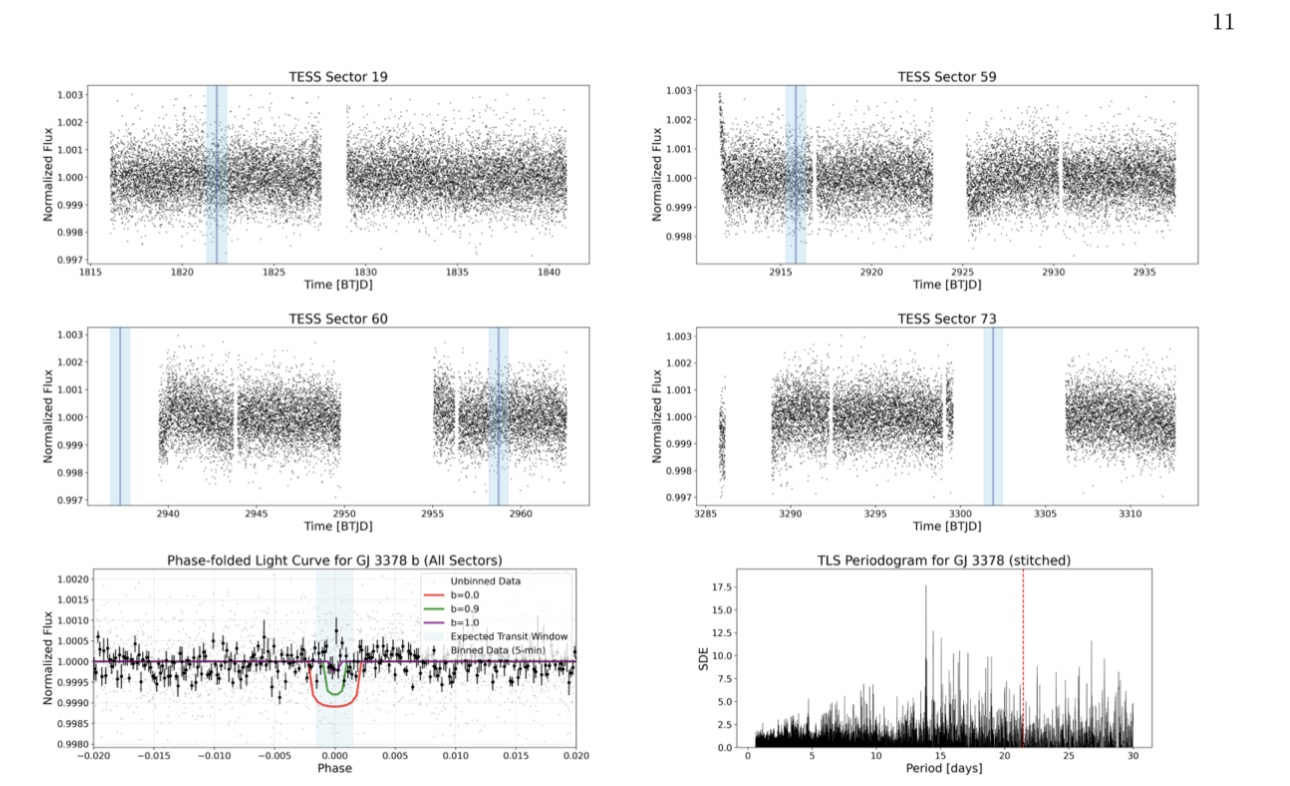
Photometry of GJ 3378 from Moutou et al. (2024) showing the possible transit of GJ 3378b

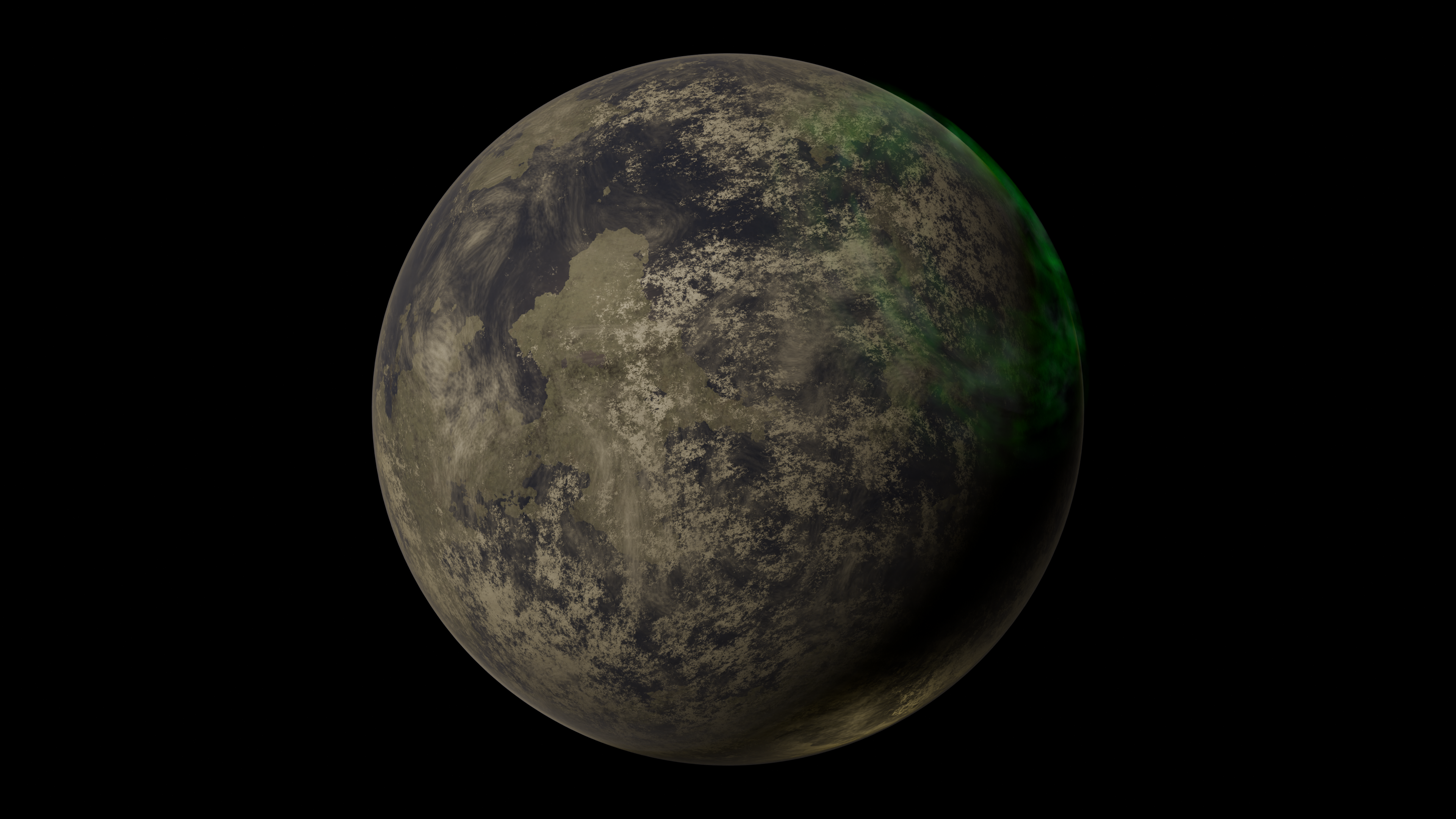
Artistic rendition of GJ 3378 b as a habitable exoplanet with oceans. Despite being in the habitable zone (HZ), it is near the cosmic shoreline and may not be habitable due to its host star stripping its atmosphere.

Moutou et al. (2024) proposed evidence for an exoplanet and obtained data on its orbit and mass using observations from the SPIRou (Spectropolarimètre infrarouge) located at the Canada–France–Hawaii Telescope (CFH) in Hawaii, United States. They reported that this planet has an eccentric orbit and an orbital period of 24.73±0.06 days. They proposed a minimum mass of 5.26 Earth masses making it a sub-Neptunian or Super-Earth type planet. Robertson et al. (2026) conducted a survey of fully convective stars within the Solar neighborhood using the near-infrared spectrograph HPF on the Hobby-Eberly Telescope (HET) at McDonald Observatory in Texas, US. They refined the planet's orbital period down to 21.45±0.01 days and its minimum mass down to 2.3±0.4 Earth masses. They also gave estimates for its orbital distance and equilibrium temperature of 0.09673±0.00080 AU and 272±7 K respectively.

Even with the reduced orbital period presented by Robertson et al. (2026), GJ 3378b would orbit within the conservative habitable zone (HZ) of the star where water could be present in its liquid state. Their reduced mass estimates would also make it more likely that this planet has a terrestrial composition. This could mean that it is a potentially habitable exoplanet. However GJ 3378b has been placed near the cosmic shoreline meaning that its atmosphere may have been lost due to radiative stripping by the parent red dwarf star.

The GJ 3378 planetary system
Companion (in order from star)	Mass	Semimajor axis (AU)	Orbital period (days)	Eccentricity	Inclination (°)	Radius
b	≥2.3±0.4 M_{🜨}	0.09673±0.0008	21.45±0.01	—	—	—
