= Struve 2398 =

Binary star system in the constellation Draco

- Location of Struve 2398 in the constellation Draco

Observation data Epoch J2000 Equinox ICRS
- Constellation: Draco
- Struve 2398 A
- Right ascension: 18^{h} 42^{m} 46.70439^{s}
- Declination: +59° 37′ 49.4095″
- Apparent magnitude (V): 8.94
- Struve 2398 B
- Right ascension: 18^{h} 42^{m} 46.89467^{s}
- Declination: +59° 37′ 36.7212″
- Apparent magnitude (V): 9.70

Characteristics

A
- Evolutionary stage: red dwarf
- Spectral type: M3V
- U−B color index: 1.10
- B−V color index: 1.54
- Variable type: Flare star

B
- Evolutionary stage: red dwarf
- Spectral type: M3.5V
- U−B color index: 1.14
- B−V color index: 1.59

Astrometry

Struve 2398 A
Radial velocity (R_{v})	−1.30±0.12 km/s
Proper motion (μ)	RA: –1311.679 mas/yr Dec.: +1792.325 mas/yr
Parallax (π)	283.8401±0.0220 mas
Distance	11.4908 ± 0.0009 ly (3.5231 ± 0.0003 pc)
Absolute magnitude (M_{V})	+11.18

Struve 2398 B
Radial velocity (R_{v})	0.88±0.15 km/s
Proper motion (μ)	RA: –1400.264 mas/yr Dec.: +1862.525 mas/yr
Parallax (π)	283.8378±0.0287 mas
Distance	11.491 ± 0.001 ly (3.5231 ± 0.0004 pc)
Absolute magnitude (M_{V})	+12.01

Orbit
Period (P)	1,166±60 years
Semi-major axis (a)	63±1 AU
Eccentricity (e)	0.4396±0.0038
Inclination (i)	73.8±0.3°
Longitude of the node (Ω)	145.32±0.37°
Periastron epoch (T)	1837±4
Argument of periastron (ω) (secondary)	321.3±4.2°

Details

Struve 2398 A
Mass	0.330±0.008 M_{☉}
Radius	0.351±0.003 R_{☉}
Luminosity	0.01552±0.00007 L_{☉}
Surface gravity (log g)	4.87±0.01 cgs
Temperature	3,433±68 K
Metallicity [Fe/H]	−0.23±0.08 dex
Rotation	103.1±6.1 days
Rotational velocity (v sin i)	< 2.5 km/s
Age	6.2±2.3 Gyr

Struve 2398 B
Mass	0.25±0.02 M_{☉}
Radius	0.280±0.005 R_{☉}
Luminosity	0.00916±0.00006 L_{☉}
Surface gravity (log g)	4.82±0.06 cgs
Temperature	3,379±31 K
Metallicity [Fe/H]	−0.30±0.08 dex
Rotation	105.1±3.3 days
Rotational velocity (v sin i)	< 2.5 km/s
Age	8.7±2.1 Gyr

Other designations
- Σ 2398, BD+59°1915, GJ 725, ADS 11632
- Struve 2398 A: Vyssotsky 184, NSV 11288, HD 173739, HIP 91768, G 227-046, LHS 58
- Struve 2398 B: HD 173740, HIP 91772, G 227-047, LHS 59

Database references
SIMBAD	The system
- A
- B
Exoplanet Archive	data

Struve 2398 (Gliese 725) is a binary star system in the northern constellation of Draco. Struve 2398 is star number 2398 in the Struve Double Star Catalog of Russian-German astronomer Friedrich Georg Wilhelm von Struve. The astronomer's surname, and hence the star identifier, is sometimes indicated by a Greek sigma, Σ; hence, this system can be listed with the identifier Σ 2398. Although the components are too faint to be viewed with the naked eye, this star system is among the closest to the Sun. Parallax measurements by the Gaia spacecraft give them an estimated distance of 11.5 light-years (3.5 parsecs) away.

Both stars are small red dwarfs, with each having around a third the Sun's mass and radius. They are each sources of X-ray emission. They are orbiting with a period of about 871 years, at a separation of about 63 astronomical units with an orbital eccentricity of 0.29.

The pair has a relatively high proper motion of 2.2 arc seconds per year. The system is on an orbit through the Milky Way that has an eccentricity of 0.05, carrying them as close as 8 kpc and as far as 9 kpc from the Galactic Center. The plane of their galactic orbit carries them as far as 463−489 pc away from the galactic plane. In 2026, a coherent 45 megahertz-radio emission was found originating from the system of Struve 2398 A. Three likely astrophysical explanations were given for this signal, including the possibility of star-planet interaction with the 11-day rocky planet Struve 2398 Ab.

== Planetary systems ==
Both stars of the Struve 2398 system are known to host planets.

Struve 2398 A has one known planet, a likely super-Earth discovered in 2024 using the radial velocity method. This planet has a minimum mass 2.8 times that of Earth, and has a close orbit with a period of 11 days; it is too close to its star to be in the habitable zone. TESS observations show that the planet likely does not transit its host star.

Struve 2398 B also hosts one known planet, a super-Earth orbiting within the habitable zone, circling its host star every 37.9 days. An additional planet with an orbital period of 4.765 days is suspected. Both were detected using the radial velocity method and announced in 2025. Other planetary candidates had previously been proposed around star B, but were not confirmed.

The Struve 2398 A (Gliese 725 A) planetary system
Companion (in order from star)	Mass	Semimajor axis (AU)	Orbital period (days)	Eccentricity	Inclination (°)	Radius
b	≥2.78±0.35 M_{🜨}	0.068±0.001	11.2201±0.0051	—	—	—

The Struve 2398 B (Gliese 725 B) planetary system
Companion (in order from star)	Mass	Semimajor axis (AU)	Orbital period (days)	Eccentricity	Inclination (°)	Radius
b (unconfirmed)	≥1.5±0.4 M_{🜨}	0.035±0.001	4.765±0.004	—	—	—
c	≥3.4±0.7 M_{🜨}	0.139±0.004	37.90±0.17	—	—	—

== See also ==
Other systems with multiple planet-hosting stars:

- 55 Cancri
- HD 20781 & HD 20782
- HD 133131
- WASP-94
- XO-2
