= HD 260655 =

Star in the constellation of Gemini

Observation data Epoch J2000 Equinox ICRS
- Constellation: Gemini
- Right ascension: 06^{h} 37^{m} 10.79880^{s}
- Declination: +17° 33′ 53.3332″
- Apparent magnitude (V): 9.77±0.11

Characteristics
- Evolutionary stage: Main sequence
- Spectral type: M0.0V
- Apparent magnitude (B): 11.10±0.07
- Apparent magnitude (V): 9.77±0.11
- Apparent magnitude (G): 8.878±0.003
- Apparent magnitude (J): 6.674±0.024
- Apparent magnitude (H): 6.031±0.016
- Apparent magnitude (K): 5.862±0.024

Astrometry
Radial velocity (R_{v})	−58.64±0.16 km/s
Proper motion (μ)	RA: −764.414 mas/yr Dec.: 337.883 mas/yr
Parallax (π)	100.0232±0.0208 mas
Distance	32.608 ± 0.007 ly (9.998 ± 0.002 pc)
Absolute magnitude (M_{V})	9.60

Details
Mass	0.439±0.011 M_{☉}
Radius	0.439±0.003 R_{☉}
Luminosity (bolometric)	0.03631±0.00018 L_{☉}
Surface gravity (log g)	5.20±0.07 cgs
Temperature	3803±10 K
Metallicity [Fe/H]	−0.43±0.04 dex
Rotation	37.5±0.4 d
Rotational velocity (v sin i)	<2.0 km/s
Age	2-8 Gyr

Other designations
- BD+17 1320, GJ 239, HD 260655, HIP 31635, CCDM J06372+1734A, WDS J06372+1733A, Ci 20 393, G 110-5, G 109-14, G 105-49, LFT 477, LHS 1858, LSPM J0637+1733, LTT 11880, NLTT 16743, PLX 1538, PM J06371+1733, Wolf 287, TOI-4599, TIC 307809773, TYC 1333-1683-1, GCRV 4273, IRAS 06342+1736, 2MASS J06371092+1733526

Database references
SIMBAD	data
Exoplanet Archive	data

HD 260655 (also known as GJ 239 or TOI-4599) is a relatively bright and cool M0 V red dwarf star located 33 light-years (10 parsecs) away from the Solar System in the constellation of Gemini. HD 260655 has two confirmed rocky planets, named HD 260655 b and HD 260655 c, that were discovered in 2022. Both planets were detected by the TESS mission and confirmed independently with archival and new precise radial velocity data obtained with the HIRES observatory since 1998, and the CARMENES survey instruments since 2016.

== Star ==
The star is among the earliest-type M dwarfs in the night sky. Its mass is 0.439 times that of the Sun, and its radius is also 0.439 times that of the Sun. It has a temperature of 3,803 K (3,530 °C; 6,386 °F) and a rotation period of 37.5 days. Other designations of HD 260655 include Wolf 287, GJ 239, TOI-4599, HIP 31635 and LHS 1858.

== Planetary system ==
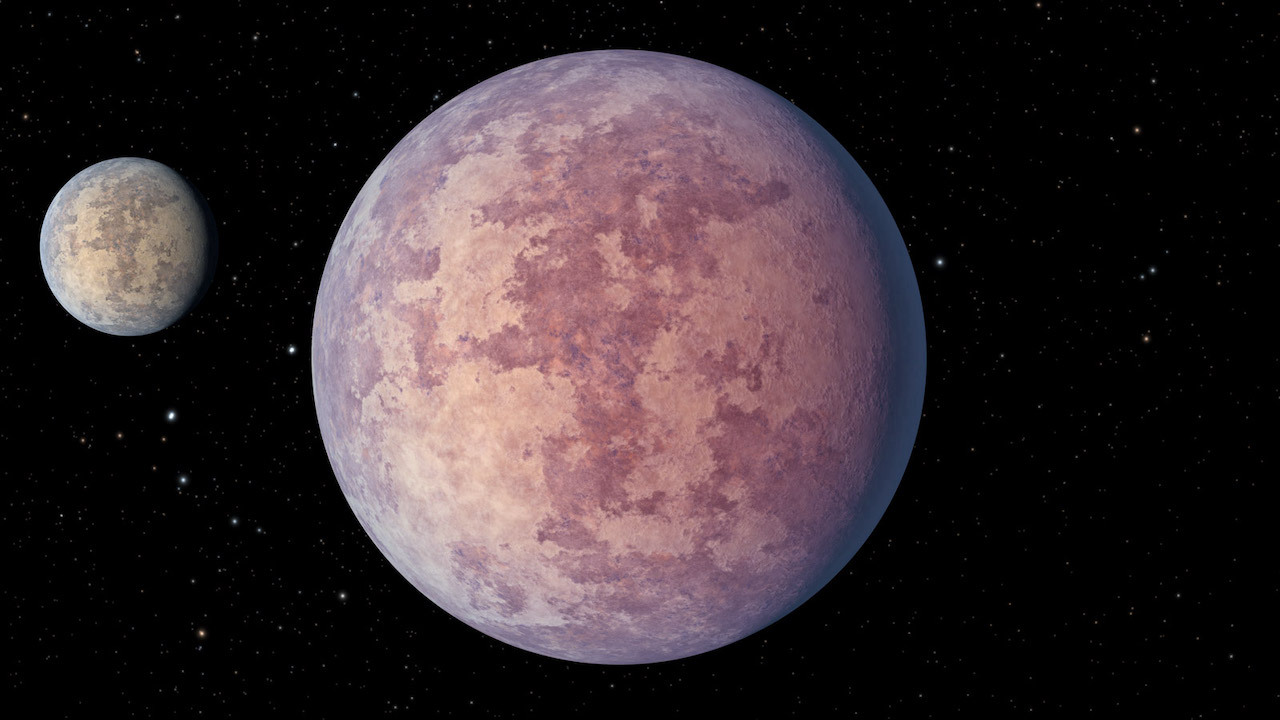
Artist's impression of the planets of HD 260655.

The mass of planet b is 2.14 M_{🜨}, with a radius of 1.240 R_{🜨}, and planet c has a mass of 3.09 M_{🜨}, with a radius of 1.533 R_{🜨}, making both planets super-Earths. The equilibrium temperature of HD 260655 b is 709 K (436 °C; 817 °F), while HD 260655 c sits at a temperature of 557 K (284 °C; 543 °F). The orbital period of HD 260655 b is 2.77 days, while HD 260655 c has an orbital period of 5.71 days.

Both planets are ideal candidates for future study of exoplanet atmospheres due to their closeness and their bright red dwarf star. However, as of 2022, there is no evidence that HD 260655 b or HD 260655 c have atmospheres. HD 260655 is also the fourth-closest known system with multiple transiting exoplanets, after HD 219134, LTT 1445, and AU Microscopii.

The HD 260655 planetary system
Companion (in order from star)	Mass	Semimajor axis (AU)	Orbital period (days)	Eccentricity	Inclination (°)	Radius
b	2.14±0.34 M_{🜨}	0.02933±0.00024	2.76953±0.00003	0.039+0.043 −0.023	87.35±0.14	1.240±0.023 R_{🜨}
c	3.09±0.48 M_{🜨}	0.04749±0.00039	5.70588±0.00007	0.038+0.036 −0.022	87.79±0.08	1.533+0.051 −0.046 R_{🜨}
