= Gliese 49 =

Star in the constellation Cassiopeia

Observation data Epoch J2000.0 Equinox ICRS
- Constellation: Cassiopeia
- Right ascension: 01^{h} 02^{m} 38.86806^{s}
- Declination: +62° 20′ 42.1763″
- Apparent magnitude (V): 9.56±0.02

Characteristics
- Evolutionary stage: main sequence
- Spectral type: M1.5 V
- B−V color index: 1.463±0.032

Astrometry
Radial velocity (R_{v})	−5.974±0.0011 km/s
Proper motion (μ)	RA: +731.088 mas/yr Dec.: +90.532 mas/yr
Parallax (π)	101.4238±0.0169 mas
Distance	32.158 ± 0.005 ly (9.860 ± 0.002 pc)
Absolute magnitude (M_{V})	9.55

Details
Mass	0.515±0.019 M_{☉}
Radius	0.511±0.018 R_{☉}
Luminosity (bolometric)	0.04938±0.00090 L_{☉}
Surface gravity (log g)	4.69±0.07 cgs
Temperature	3,805±51 K
Metallicity [Fe/H]	+0.13±0.16 dex
Rotation	18.86+0.10 −0.09 d
Rotational velocity (v sin i)	<2 km/s

Other designations
- BD+61°195, GJ 49, HIP 4872, LTT 10363

Database references
SIMBAD	data
Exoplanet Archive	data

Gliese 49 is a star in the northern constellation of Cassiopeia. Visually, it is located 106 arcminutes north of the bright star γ Cassiopeiae. With an apparent visual magnitude of 9.56, it is not observable with the naked eye. It is located, based on the parallax of Gaia (101.42±0.02 mas), 32.1 light-years away from the Solar System. The star is drifting closer to the Sun with a radial velocity of −6 km/s.

This object is a red dwarf star of spectral type M1.5V. Much dimmer than the Sun, it has a total luminosity that is 4.9% that of the Sun; it is, however, much brighter than other nearby red dwarfs such as Proxima Centauri or Wolf 359. It has an effective temperature of 3,805±51 K. Its mass is 52% that of the Sun, and 51% of its radius.

It rotates on its axis with a projected rotation speed of under 2 km/s, and has a rotation period of 18.86 days. It has a metallic content similar to that of the Sun, with its index of metallicity [M / H] = +0.03. Although its age is not known exactly, it is younger than 250 million years.

Gliese 49 has a similar proper motion to the red dwarf flare star V388 Cassiopeiae. The visual separation between the two is 295 arcseconds, which implies that the real distance between them is over 2,900 AU. Both stars are associated with the Hyades, as suggested by its young age and chromospheric activity levels.

== Planetary system ==
One known planet is known to orbit Gliese 49. Gliese 49 b is a super-Earth planet detected by the radial velocity method.

The Gliese 49 planetary system
Companion (in order from star)	Mass	Semimajor axis (AU)	Orbital period (days)	Eccentricity	Inclination (°)	Radius
b	5.63+0.67 −0.68 M_{🜨}	0.0905 ± 0.0011	13.8508+0.0053 −0.0051	0.363+0.099 −0.096	—	—
