= GL Virginis =

Star in the constellation Virgo

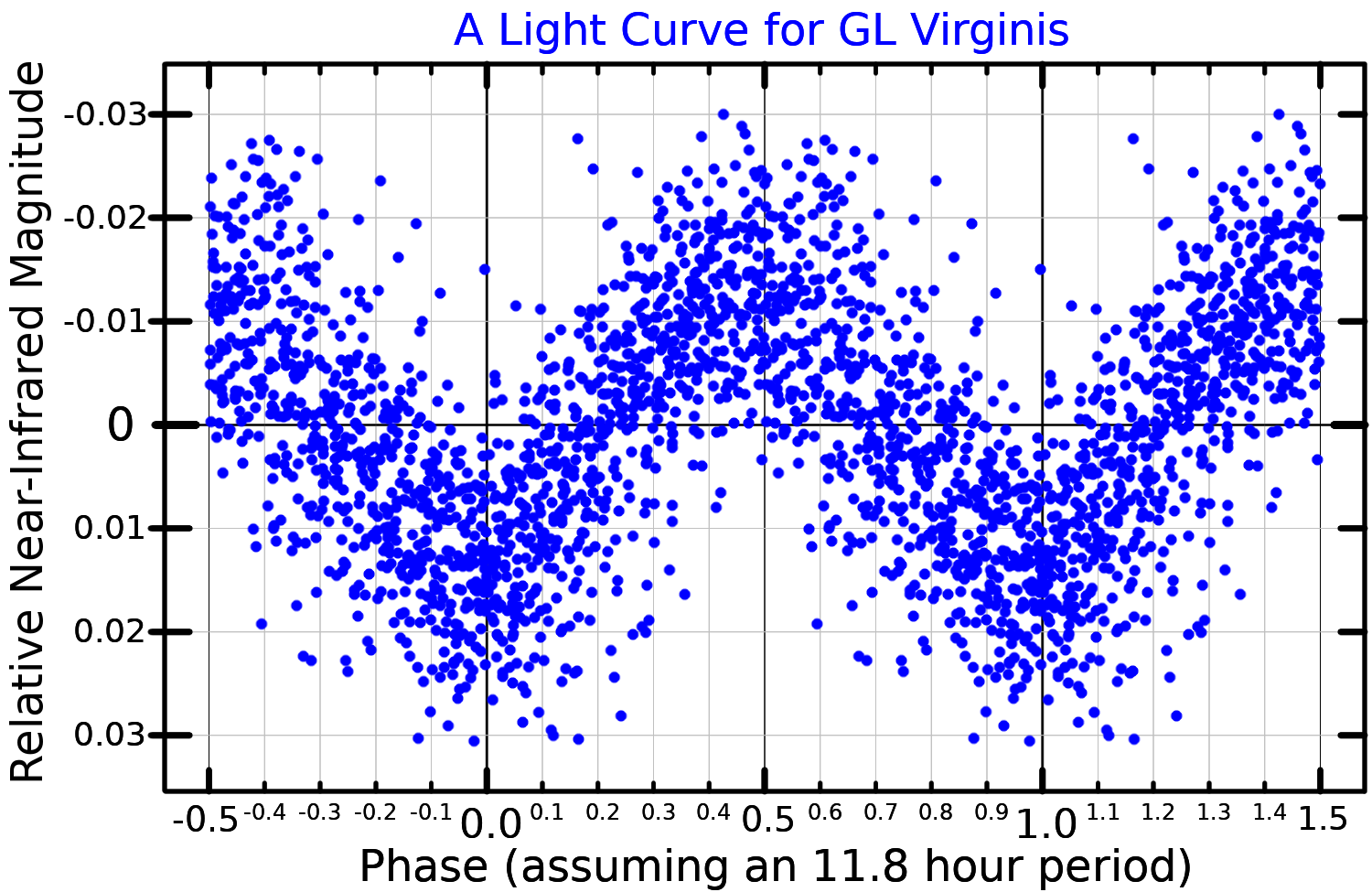
- A near-infrared light curve for GL Virginis, adapted from Díez Alonso et al. (2019)

Observation data Epoch J2000 Equinox J2000
- Constellation: Virgo
- Right ascension: 12^{h} 18^{m} 59.39973^{s}
- Declination: +11° 07′ 33.7732″
- Apparent magnitude (V): 13.898

Characteristics
- Spectral type: M5
- U−B color index: +1.065
- B−V color index: +1.88
- Variable type: Flare star

Astrometry
| Radial velocity (R_{v}) | 5.82 km/s |
| Proper motion (μ) | RA: −1269.771 mas/yr Dec.: 203.444 mas/yr |
| Parallax (π) | 154.6999±0.0445 mas |
| Distance | 21.083 ± 0.006 ly (6.464 ± 0.002 pc) |
| Absolute magnitude (M_{V}) | 14.72 |

Details
| Mass | 0.12 M_{☉} |
| Radius | 0.16 R_{☉} |
| Surface gravity (log g) | 5.0 cgs |
| Temperature | 3110 K |
| Metallicity [Fe/H] | 0.17 dex |
| Rotation | 0.491 d |
| Rotational velocity (v sin i) | 17 km/s |

Other designations
- GL Vir, GJ 1156, G 12-30, LHS 324, LP 494-77, LTT 13440, PLX 2835.0, 2MASS J12185939+1107338

Database references
| SIMBAD | data |

GL Virginis, also known as G 12-30, is a star in the constellation of Virgo. It is a faint red dwarf, like more than 70% of the stars located within 10 parsecs (32.6 ly) of the Solar System; its magnitude visual magnitude is 13.898, making it impossible to see with the naked eye.

In 1977, Glen J. Veeder and Olav L. Hansen announced that the star, then called GL 12-30, is a variable star. It was given its variable star designation, GL Virginis, in 1981.

Located 21.1 light years (6.46 parsecs) away, GL Virginis has a spectral type of M4.5V and an effective temperature of approximately 3110 K. Its luminosity (emitted in the visible section of the electromagnetic spectrum) is only one ten-thousandth compared to the Sun; however, since a significant fraction of its radiation is emitted as invisible infrared light, its bolometric luminosity increases to 0.5% of that of the Sun. Its mass is 12% that of the Sun and its radius is 16% of the Sun. It is a fairly rapid rotator: its rotational velocity is least 17 km/s, which implies that it takes less than half a day to complete a rotation on its axis. The star is emitting frequent flares, with at least five detected by 2019.

The closest known star system to GL Virginis is Gliese 486, 6.4 light-years away.
