= EQ Pegasi =

Star system in the constellation Pegasus

- Location of EQ Pegasi in the constellation Pegasus

Observation data Epoch J2000.0 Equinox ICRS
- Constellation: Pegasus
- EQ Pegasi A
- Right ascension: 23^{h} 31^{m} 52.17385^{s}
- Declination: +19° 56′ 14.1304″
- Apparent magnitude (V): 10.38 (min)
- EQ Pegasi B
- Right ascension: 23^{h} 31^{m} 52.57534^{s}
- Declination: +19° 56′ 14.0050″
- Apparent magnitude (V): 12.58 (min)

Characteristics

EQ Pegasi A
- Evolutionary stage: red dwarf
- Spectral type: M4Ve
- Variable type: Flare star

EQ Pegasi B
- Evolutionary stage: red dwarf
- Spectral type: M6Ve
- Variable type: Flare star

Astrometry

EQ Pegasi A
| Radial velocity (R_{v}) | −0.21±0.82 km/s |
| Proper motion (μ) | RA: 578.009(35) mas/yr Dec.: −59.769(23) mas/yr |
| Parallax (π) | 159.6634±0.0341 mas |
| Distance | 20.428 ± 0.004 ly (6.263 ± 0.001 pc) |

EQ Pegasi B
| Proper motion (μ) | RA: 552.349(55) mas/yr Dec.: 20.275(36) mas/yr |
| Parallax (π) | 159.9085±0.0513 mas |
| Distance | 20.396 ± 0.007 ly (6.254 ± 0.002 pc) |

Orbit
| Period (P) | 83,664.63 ± 1.98 days (229.0613 ± 0.0054 a) |
| Semi-major axis (a) | 5.05797±0.00043" (31.635±0.033 AU) |
| Eccentricity (e) | 0.108047±0.000053 |
| Inclination (i) | 130.065±0.010° |
| Longitude of the node (Ω) | 255.0919±0.0034° |
| Periastron epoch (T) | 2,401,891.34±1.19 |
| Argument of periastron (ω) (secondary) | 307.1416±0.0045° |

Details

A
| Mass | 0.43599±0.00092 M_{☉} |
| Radius | 0.409±0.016 R_{☉} |
| Luminosity | 0.019 L_{☉} |
| Temperature | 3,353±60 K |
| Rotation | 1.061 days |

B
| Mass | 0.16527±0.00025 M_{☉} |
| Radius | 0.303±0.013 R_{☉} |
| Luminosity | 0.008 L_{☉} |
| Temperature | 3,072±60 K |
| Rotation | 0.404 days |

Other designations
- EQ Peg, BD+19°5116, GJ 896, HIP 116132, WDS J23317+1956AB, G 68-24, G 129-19, G 128-71, LFT 1799, LHS 3965, LTT 16919, NLTT 57135
- EQ Peg A: TYC 1723-23-1, 2MASS J23315208+1956142
- EQ Peg B: LFT 1800, LHS 3966, LTT 16920, NLTT 57136, TYC 1723-23-2, 2MASS J23315244+1956138

Database references
| SIMBAD | The system |
- A
- B
| Exoplanet Archive | data |

EQ Pegasi (also known as Gliese 896) is a nearby binary system of two red dwarfs. Both components are flare stars, with spectral types of M4Ve and M6Ve respectively, and a current separation between the components of 5.8 arcseconds. The system is at a distance of 20.4 light-years (6.25 parsecs) and is 950 million years old. The primary star is orbited by one known exoplanet.

== Discovery ==
EQ Pegasi was first noticed to be a binary star by Carl A. Wirtanen who in the course of a systematic survey of the McCormick Observatory photographic plates for M-type dwarfs, detected a companion about two magnitudes fainter at a separation of 3.5 arcseconds.

Both components were also thought to be single-lined spectroscopic binaries, with faint companions that have not been resolved in orbits of a few years, but this is no longer thought to be the case. A 2021 study of nearby stars states that "the spectroscopic binarity classification [...] is almost certainly due to activity".

== Planetary system ==
In 2022, a Jovian planet was discovered in orbit around the system's primary star via radio astrometry. Along with the planet around TVLM 513-46546, this is the first confirmed exoplanet discovered entirely using astrometry.

The Gliese 896 A planetary system
| Companion (in order from star) | Mass | Semimajor axis (AU) | Orbital period (days) | Eccentricity | Inclination (°) | Radius |
|---|---|---|---|---|---|---|
| b | 2.26±0.57 M_{J} | 0.64282±0.00068 | 284.39±1.47 | 0.35±0.19 | 69.20±25.61 | — |

== In culture ==
In 1998, it was the basis of a hoax, as a telecommunications company claimed it had discovered "alien" signals originating from the star.

== Gallery ==
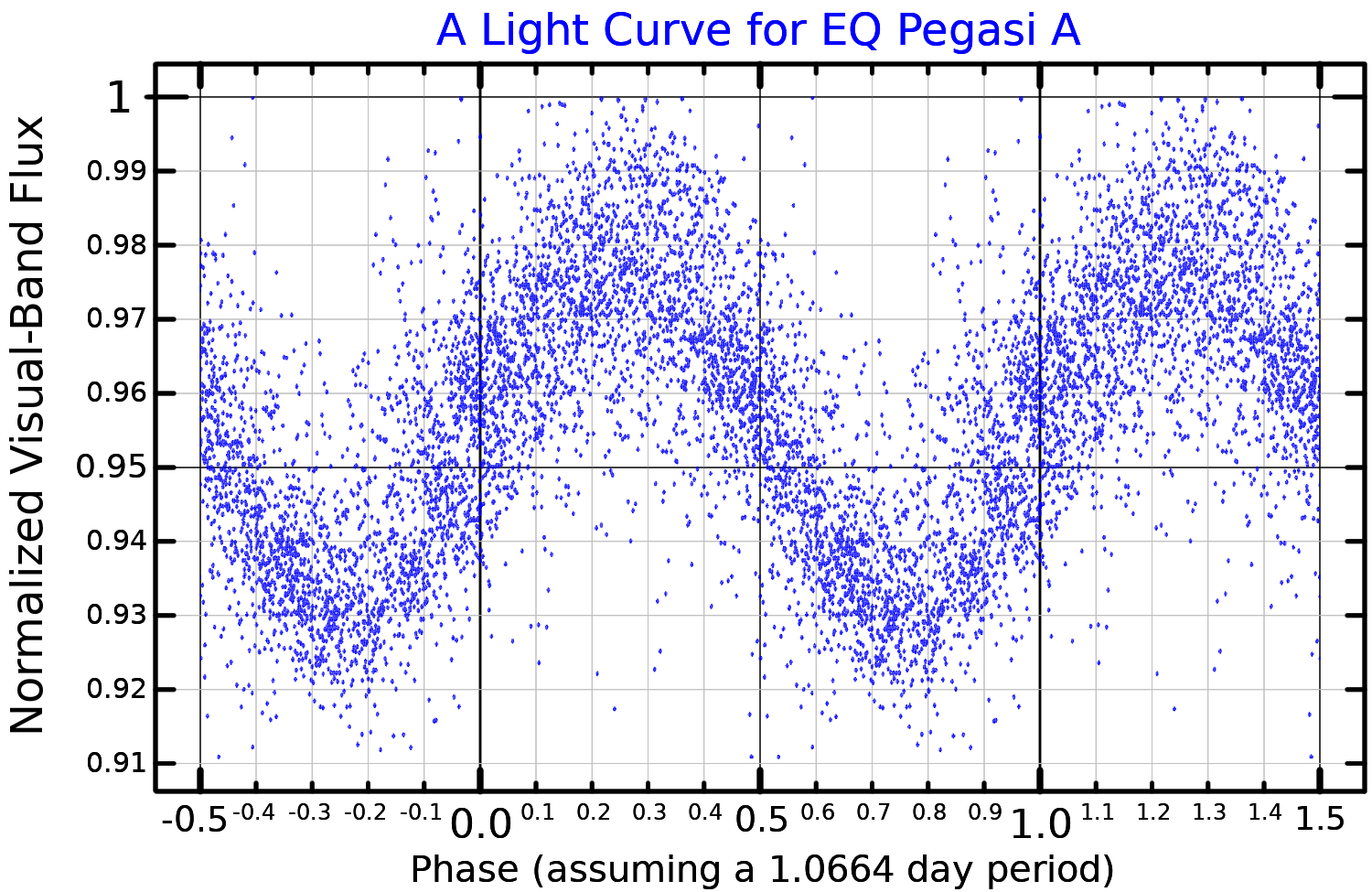
A visual band light curve for EQ Pegasi A, adapted from Norton et al. (2007)

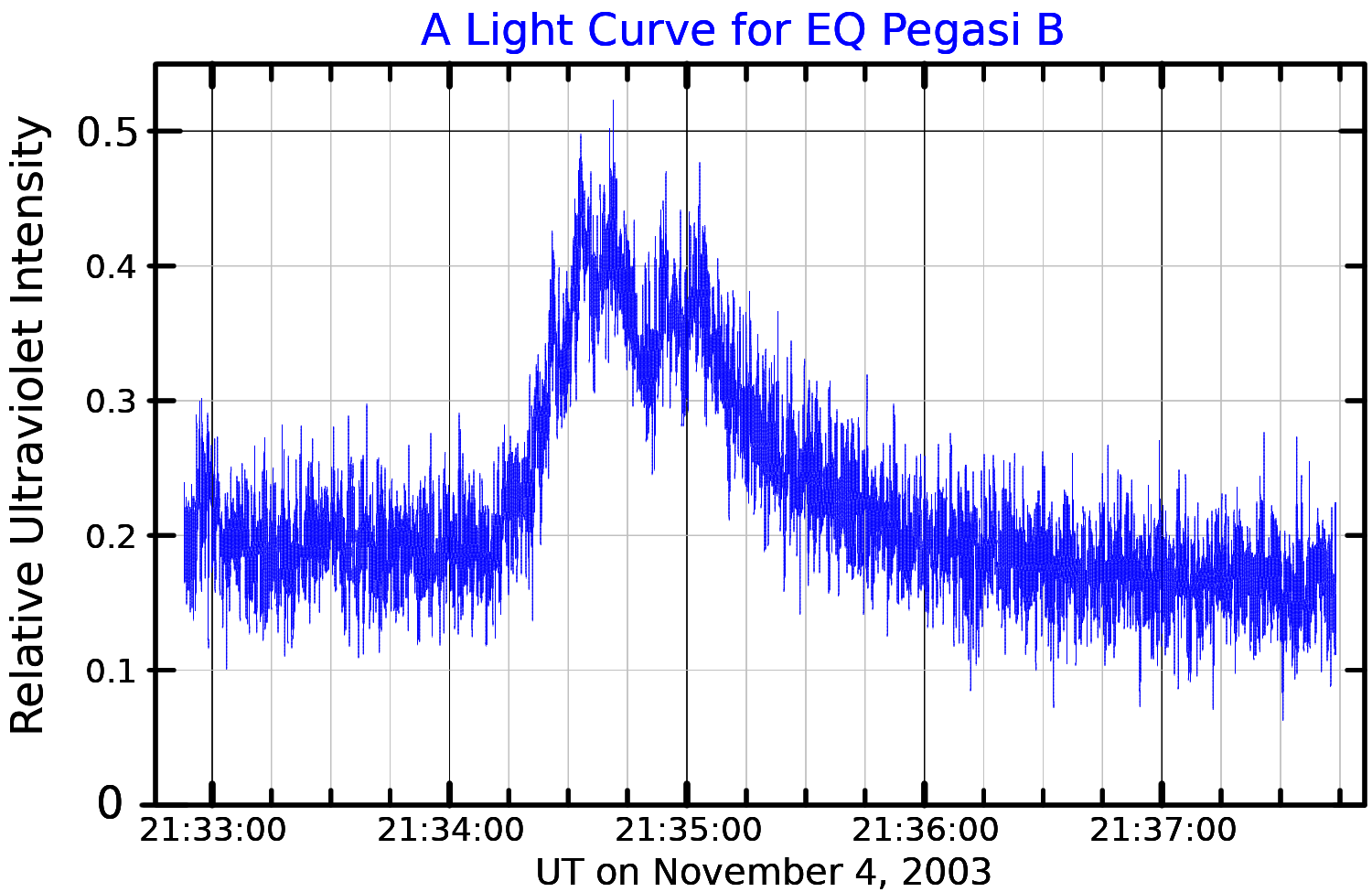
An ultraviolet band light curve for a flare on EQ Pegasi B, adapted from Mathioudakis et al. (2006)
