= YZ Ceti =

Star in the constellation Cetus

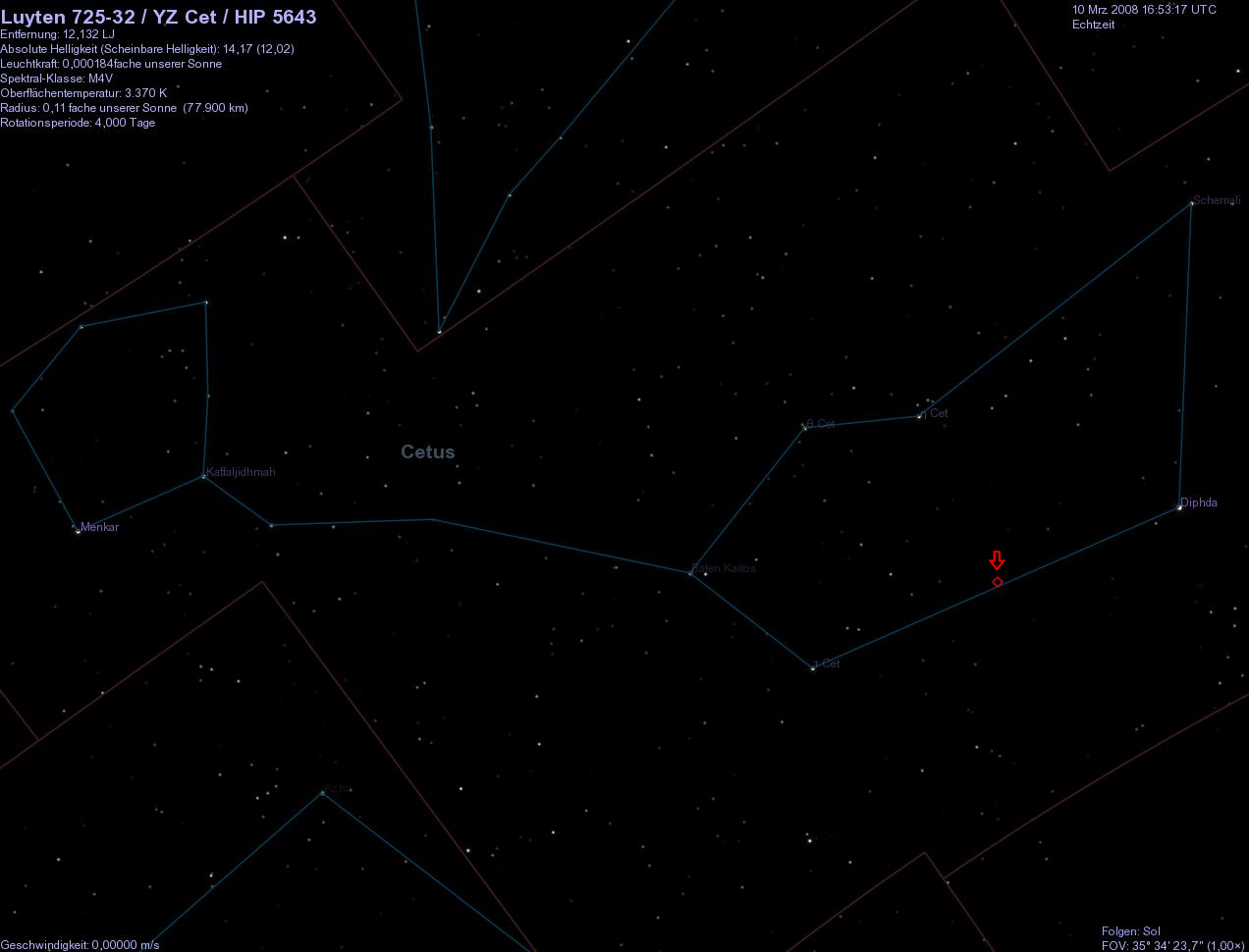
- Location of YZ Ceti, click for larger image.

Observation data Epoch J2000 Equinox ICRS
- Constellation: Cetus
- Right ascension: 01^{h} 12^{m} 30.6369^{s}
- Declination: −16° 59′ 56.358″
- Apparent magnitude (V): 12.03 - 12.18

Characteristics
- Evolutionary stage: red dwarf
- Spectral type: M4.0Ve
- U−B color index: +1.430
- B−V color index: +1.811
- Variable type: Flare star

Astrometry
Radial velocity (R_{v})	+28.09 km/s
Proper motion (μ)	RA: 1,205.074 mas/yr Dec.: 637.547 mas/yr
Parallax (π)	269.0573±0.0337 mas
Distance	12.122 ± 0.002 ly (3.7167 ± 0.0005 pc)
Absolute magnitude (M_{V})	14.30

Details
Mass	0.130±0.013 M_{☉}
Radius	0.168±0.009 R_{☉}
Luminosity	0.002195 L_{☉}
Surface gravity (log g)	5.20 cgs
Temperature	3056±60 K
Metallicity [Fe/H]	−0.26±0.08 dex
Rotation	79.82±2.09 days
Rotational velocity (v sin i)	3.40 km/s
Age	5.0±1.0 Gyr

Other designations
- GCTP 248.01, GJ 54.1, HIP 5643, G 268-135, L 725-32, LHS 138, LTT 670, 2MASS J01123052-1659570

Database references
SIMBAD	data
Exoplanet Archive	data
ARICNS	data

YZ Ceti is a red dwarf star in the constellation Cetus. Although it is relatively close to the Sun at just 12 light years (3.6 parsecs), this star cannot be seen with the naked eye. It is classified as a flare star that undergoes intermittent fluctuations in luminosity. YZ Ceti is about 13 percent the mass of the Sun and 17% of its radius.

This star is unusually close to Tau Ceti, a star of spectral class G8. The two are only about 1.6 light years apart, a little more than a third of the distance from the Sun to the Solar System's nearest neighbor, Proxima Centauri.

== Variability ==
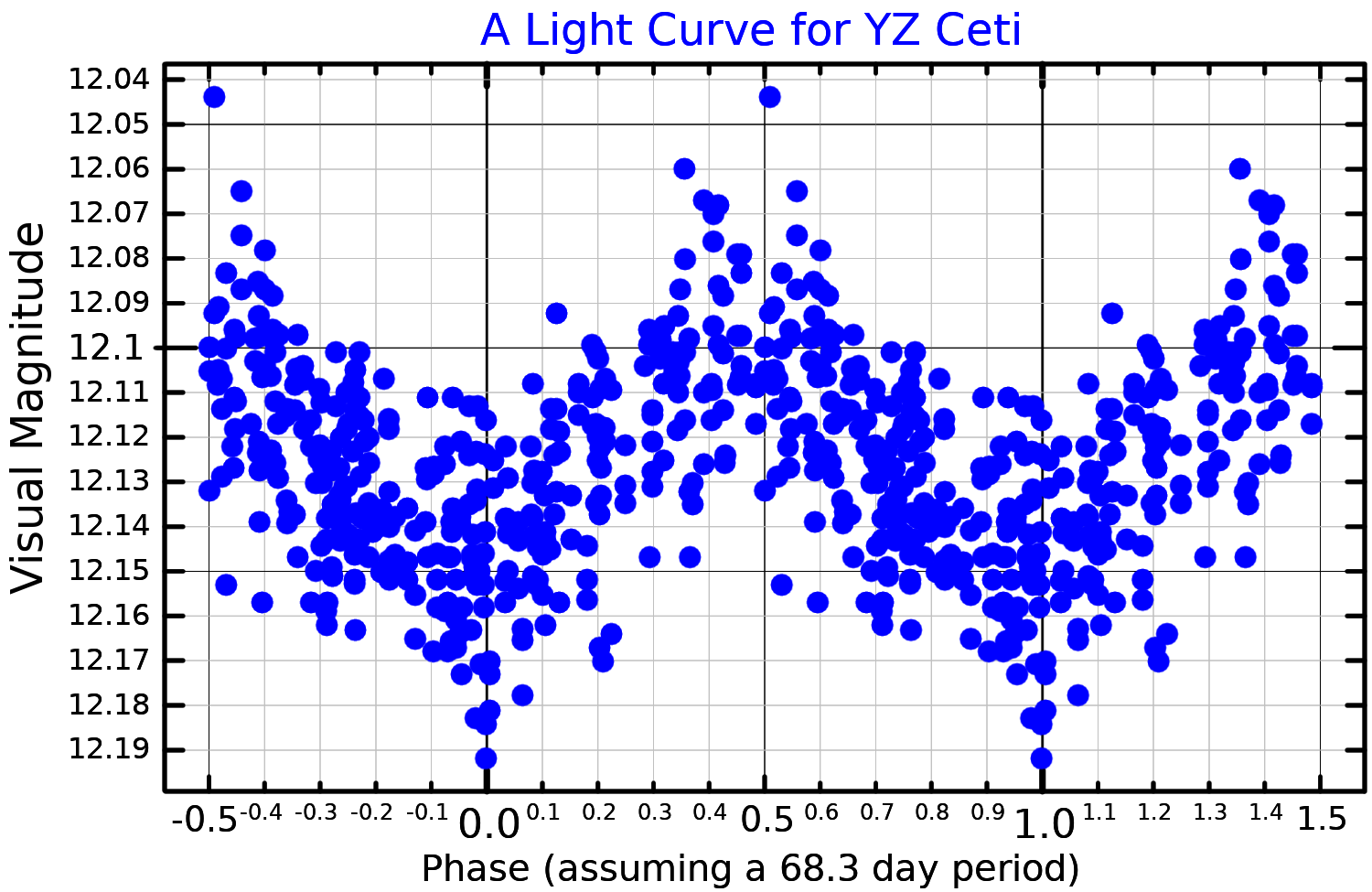
A visual band light curve for YZ Ceti, adapted from Jayasinghe et al. (2017)

YZ Ceti is a variable star designation: the star shows occasional rapid and brief increases in brightness, sometimes reaching magnitude 12.03, caused by eruptions from the surface. This type of variable star is known as a UV Ceti star after its first member, or more colloquially as a flare star.

YZ Ceti also shows small periodic variations in brightness caused by starspots or chromospheric features moving as the star rotates. This class of variable stars are known as BY Draconis variables. The periodic variations allow the rotational period of the star to be measured at 68.3 days, although modelling of its planetary system gives a rotational period for the star of 83 days.

== Planetary system ==
On 10 August 2017 three planets were announced to have been discovered around YZ Ceti and a possible fourth sub-Earth planet candidate, still needing confirmation, with 0.472±0.096 Earth masses at an orbital period of 1.04 days. The orbits of the three confirmed planets were determined to be too close to YZ Ceti to be within the star's habitable zone, with equilibrium temperatures ranging from 347–491 K (74–218 °C; 165–424 °F), 299–423 K (26–150 °C; 79–302 °F), and 260–368 K (−13–95 °C; 8–203 °F) for planets b, c, and d, respectively.

An August 2018 study reexamined the discovery measurements, confirming the orbit of YZ Ceti d, but finding a possibly marginally longer orbital period of YZ Ceti b of 2.02 days rather than 1.97 days, and additionally finding that YZ Ceti c probably orbits in only 0.75 days rather than 3.06 days. If the latter is true, YZ Ceti c would have a mass of only 0.58 Earth masses and a roughly 10% chance of transiting YZ Ceti from the Earth's viewpoint. However, a 2020 study did not support the latter conclusion, finding the 0.75-day period to be an alias of the true 3.06-day period. It also did not find evidence for the fourth candidate planet.

Two 2023 studies detected bursts of radiation in radio wavelengths from YZ Ceti, which is likely associated with interaction of the innermost planet, YZ Ceti b, with the star as well as evidence for the presence of magnetic fields. It may be the first detection of a magnetic field generated by a terrestrial exoplanet. (Previously, the magnetic field had been only found in gas giant exoplanets including HAT-P-11b.)

The YZ Ceti planetary system
Companion	Minimum mass (M_{⊕})	Maximum mass (M_{⊕})	Semi-major axis (AU)	Orbital period (days)	Eccentricity	Inclination	Radius (R_{⊕})
b	≥0.70+0.09 −0.08	1.4	0.01634^{+0.00035}_{−0.00041}	2.02087^{+0.00007}_{−0.00009}	0.06+0.06 −0.04		
c	≥1.14+0.11 −0.10	2.3	0.02156^{+0.00046}_{−0.00054}	3.05989^{+0.00010}_{−0.00010}	0.00		
d	≥1.09±0.12	2.2	0.02851^{+0.00061}_{−0.00071}	4.65626^{+0.00028}_{−0.00029}	0.07+0.04 −0.05		

== See also ==
- List of nearest stars and brown dwarfs
- Tau Boötis b, HAT-P-11b and HD 209458 b, other extrasolar planets with evidence of magnetic fields
