= Gliese 48 =

Red dwarf

Observation data Epoch J2000.0 Equinox ICRS
- Constellation: Cassiopeia
- Right ascension: 01^{h} 02^{m} 32.23543^{s}
- Declination: +71° 40′ 47.3363″
- Apparent magnitude (V): 10.2

Characteristics
- Evolutionary stage: Red dwarf
- Spectral type: M3.0V

Astrometry
| Radial velocity (R_{v}) | +1.34±0.15 km/s |
| Proper motion (μ) | RA: +1,746.701 mas/yr Dec.: −381.762 mas/yr |
| Parallax (π) | 121.4598±0.0158 mas |
| Distance | 26.853 ± 0.003 ly (8.233 ± 0.001 pc) |

Details
| Mass | 0.470±0.010 M_{☉} |
| Radius | 0.463±0.010 R_{☉} |
| Luminosity | 10^{−1.56±0.04} L_{☉} |
| Temperature | 3450±50 K |
| Rotation | 51.5±2.6 d |
| Rotational velocity (v sin i) | <2 km/s |

Other designations
- GJ 48, LHS 131, Ross 318, TIC 379084450, 2MASS J01023213+7140475

Database references
| SIMBAD | data |
| Exoplanet Archive | data |

Gliese 48 (also known as Ross 318) is a red dwarf star located in the constellation Cassiopeia. Visually, it is located between 31 Cassiopeiae and 23 Cassiopeiae. Due to its apparent magnitude, it is not visible to the naked eye.

== Physical characteristics ==
Gliese 48 is a red dwarf of spectral type M3.5V. Much dimmer than the Sun, its luminosity is approximately 2.7% of the solar luminosity. It has a mass of approximately 0.47 solar masses and a radius of approximately 0.46 solar radii. Its effective temperature is estimated at 3450 K. The star shows metallic content consistent with solar levels and may exhibit flare activity.

== Claimed planet ==
A 2026 paper (published on arXiv in May and in a journal in June) claimed the detection of a super-Earth planet, Gliese 48 b, through a combined analysis of radial velocity data (CARMENES and HIRES) and TESS photometry. The planet would orbit the star in approximately 39.6 days and lie within the optimistic habitable zone of the system. The planet was even added to the NASA Exoplanet Archive, but the arXiv version of the discovery paper was retracted by its author in October 2026.
