= Gliese 514 =

Star in the constellation Virgo

Observation data Epoch J2000 Equinox ICRS
- Constellation: Virgo
- Right ascension: 13^{h} 29^{m} 59.78590^{s}
- Declination: +10° 22′ 37.7845″
- Apparent magnitude (V): 9.029

Characteristics
- Evolutionary stage: main sequence
- Spectral type: M0Ve
- Apparent magnitude (J): 5.902±0.018
- Apparent magnitude (H): 5.300±0.033

Astrometry
Radial velocity (R_{v})	14.12±0.12 km/s
Proper motion (μ)	RA: 1,127.341 mas/yr Dec.: −1,073.888 mas/yr
Parallax (π)	131.1013±0.0270 mas
Distance	24.878 ± 0.005 ly (7.628 ± 0.002 pc)
Absolute magnitude (M_{V})	+9.63

Details
Mass	0.562 M_{☉}
Radius	0.611±0.043 R_{☉}
Luminosity (bolometric)	0.043 L_{☉}
Surface gravity (log g)	4.78 cgs
Temperature	3,727 K
Metallicity [Fe/H]	−0.07±0.07 dex
Rotation	28.0±2.9 days
Rotational velocity (v sin i)	2.00 km/s
Age	8.25 Gyr

Other designations
- BD+11 2576, HIP 65859, LTT 13925, Ross 490, TYC 895-317-1, 2MASS J13295979+1022376, Gaia EDR3 3738099879558957952

Database references
SIMBAD	data
Exoplanet Archive	data

Gliese 514, also known as BD+11 2576 or HIP 65859, is an M-type main-sequence star, in the constellation Virgo 24.88 light-years away from the Solar System.

Gliese 514's metallicity Fe/H index is largely unknown, with median values from -0.4 to +0.18 reported in the literature. This discrepancy is due to peculiarities of the stellar spectrum of Gliese 514. The spectrum peculiarities also affect the accuracy of the star's temperature measurement, with reported values as low as 2901 K. The spectrum of Gliese 514 shows emission lines, but the star itself has a low starspot activity.

Multiplicity surveys did not detect any stellar companions as of 2020.

The Sun is currently calculated to be passing through the tidal tail of Gliese 514's Oort cloud. Thus, future interstellar objects passing through the Solar System may originate from Gliese 514.

== Planetary system ==
The existence of a planet on a 15-day orbit around Gliese 514 was first suspected in 2019. However, that planet was not confirmed. Instead, in 2022, one Super-Earth planet, named Gliese 514 b, was discovered on an eccentric 140-day orbit by the radial velocity method. The planetary orbit partially lies within the habitable zone of the parent star with planetary equilibrium temperature, averaged along orbit, equal to 202±11 K.

The infrared excess of the star also indicates the possible presence of a debris disk in the system, albeit at a low signal to noise ratio.

The Gliese 514 planetary system
Companion (in order from star)	Mass	Semimajor axis (AU)	Orbital period (days)	Eccentricity	Inclination (°)	Radius
b	>5.2±0.9 M_{🜨}	0.422^{+0.014}_{−0.015}	140.43±0.41	0.45^{+0.15}_{−0.14}	—	—
