= Gliese 687 =

Star in the constellation Draco

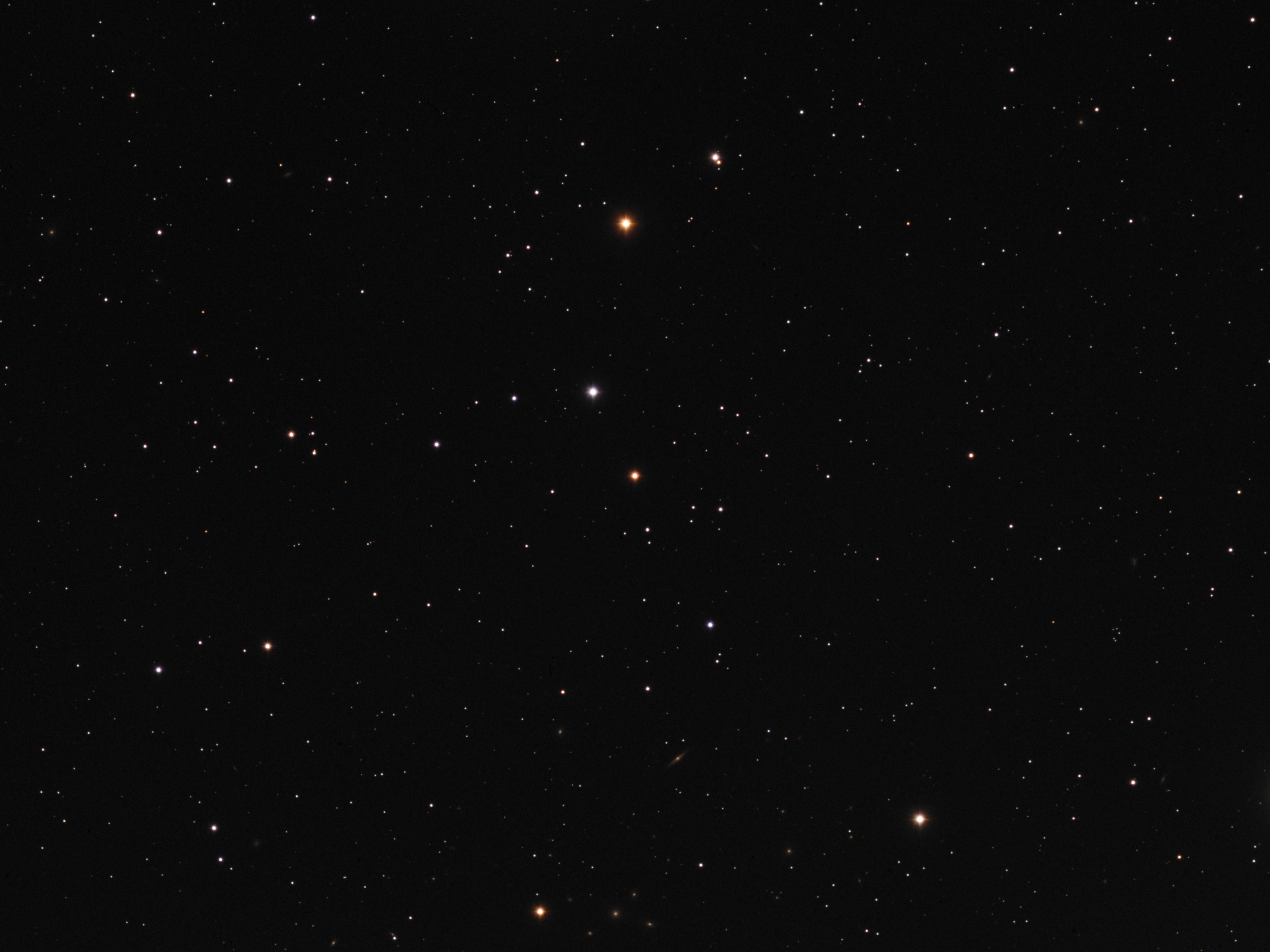
- Gliese 687 is the small orange star located in the center of the above image.

Observation data Epoch J2000 Equinox ICRS
- Constellation: Draco
- Right ascension: 17^{h} 36^{m} 25.89931^{s}
- Declination: +68° 20′ 20.9096″
- Apparent magnitude (V): 9.15

Characteristics
- Spectral type: M3.5 V
- U−B color index: 1.06
- B−V color index: 1.49

Astrometry
Radial velocity (R_{v})	−28.90±0.13 km/s
Proper motion (μ)	RA: −320.675 mas/yr Dec.: −1269.893 mas/yr
Parallax (π)	219.7898±0.0210 mas
Distance	14.839 ± 0.001 ly (4.5498 ± 0.0004 pc)
Absolute magnitude (M_{V})	10.87

Details
Mass	0.40±0.02 M_{☉}
Radius	0.4183±0.0070 R_{☉}
Luminosity	0.02128±0.00023 L_{☉}
Surface gravity (log g)	4.66 cgs
Temperature	3,413±28 K
Metallicity [Fe/H]	+0.11 ± 0.20 dex
Rotation	61.8±1.0 d
Rotational velocity (v sin i)	<2.8 km/s

Other designations
- BD+68 946, GJ 687, HIP 86162, SAO 17568, LHS 450, LTT 15232, PLX 4029.00

Database references
SIMBAD	data
Exoplanet Archive	data
- Location of Gliese 687 in the constellation Draco

Gliese 687, or GJ 687 (Gliese–Jahreiß 687) is a red dwarf in the constellation Draco. It is one of the closest stars to the Sun and lies at a distance of 14.84 light-years (4.55 parsecs). Even though it is close by, it has an apparent magnitude of about 9, so it can only be seen through a moderately sized telescope. Gliese 687 has a high proper motion, advancing 1.304 arcseconds per year across the sky. It has a net relative velocity of about 39 km/s. It is also known to have two confirmed Neptune-mass exoplanets around it. Old books and articles refer to it as Argelander Oeltzen 17415.

== Properties ==
Gliese 687 has about 40% of the Sun's mass and nearly 50% of the Sun's radius. Compared to the Sun, it has a slightly higher proportion of elements with higher atomic numbers than helium. It seems to rotate every 60 days and exhibit some chromospheric activity.

It displays no excess of infrared radiation that would indicate orbiting dust.

Gliese 687 has no known stellar companions, and emits X-rays.

== Planetary system ==
In 2014, Gliese 687 was discovered to have a planet, Gliese 687 b, with a minimum mass of 18.394 Earth masses (which makes it comparable to Neptune), an orbital period of 38.14 days, a low orbital eccentricity and inside the habitable zone. Another Neptune-mass planet candidate was discovered in 2020, in a further out and much colder orbit.

The Gliese 687 planetary system
Companion (in order from star)	Mass	Semimajor axis (AU)	Orbital period (days)	Eccentricity	Inclination (°)	Radius
b	≥17.2±1.0 M_{🜨}	0.163±0.003	38.142±0.007	0.17±0.05	—	—
c	≥16.0±4.1 M_{🜨}	1.165±0.023	727.562±12.198	0.40±0.22	—	—

== See also ==
- List of nearest stars and brown dwarfs
- List of exoplanets discovered in 2014 - Gliese 687 b
- List of exoplanets discovered in 2020 - Gliese 687 c
