= Gliese 176 b =

Super-Earth exoplanet orbiting Gliese 176

Discovery
- Discovered by: Endl, Forveille et al.
- Discovery date: September 7, 2007
- Detection method: radial velocity

Orbital characteristics
- Semi-major axis: 0.066±0.001 AU
- Eccentricity: 0.148+0.249 −0.036
- Orbital period (sidereal): 8.776+0.001 −0.002 d
- Time of periastron: 2450839.760
- Argument of periastron: 150.6+42.2 −104.5
- Semi-amplitude: 4.49+1.00 −0.23
- Star: Gliese 176

Physical characteristics
- Temperature: ~450 K

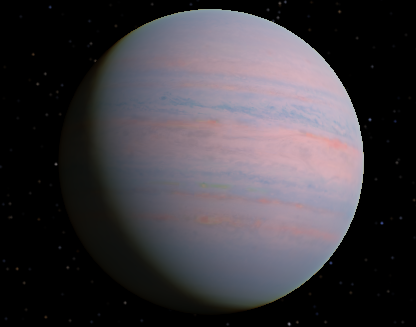
Gliese 176 b

Gliese 176 b is a super-Earth exoplanet approximately 31 light years away in the constellation of Taurus. This planet orbits very close to its parent red dwarf star Gliese 176 (also called "HD 285968").

The initial announcement confused the planetary periodicity with the stellar periodicity of 40 days, thus giving a 10.24 day period for a 25 Earth-mass planet. Subsequent readings filtered out the star's rotation, giving a more accurate reading of the planet's orbit and minimum mass.

The planet orbits inside the inner magnetosphere of its star. The quoted temperature of 450 K is a "thermal equilibrium" temperature.

It is projected to be dominated by a rocky core, but the true mass is unknown. If the orbit is oriented such that we are viewing it at a nearly face-on angle, the planet may be significantly more massive than the lower limit. If so, it may have attracted a gas envelope like Uranus or Gliese 436 b.
