= GJ 1151 =

Red dwarf star

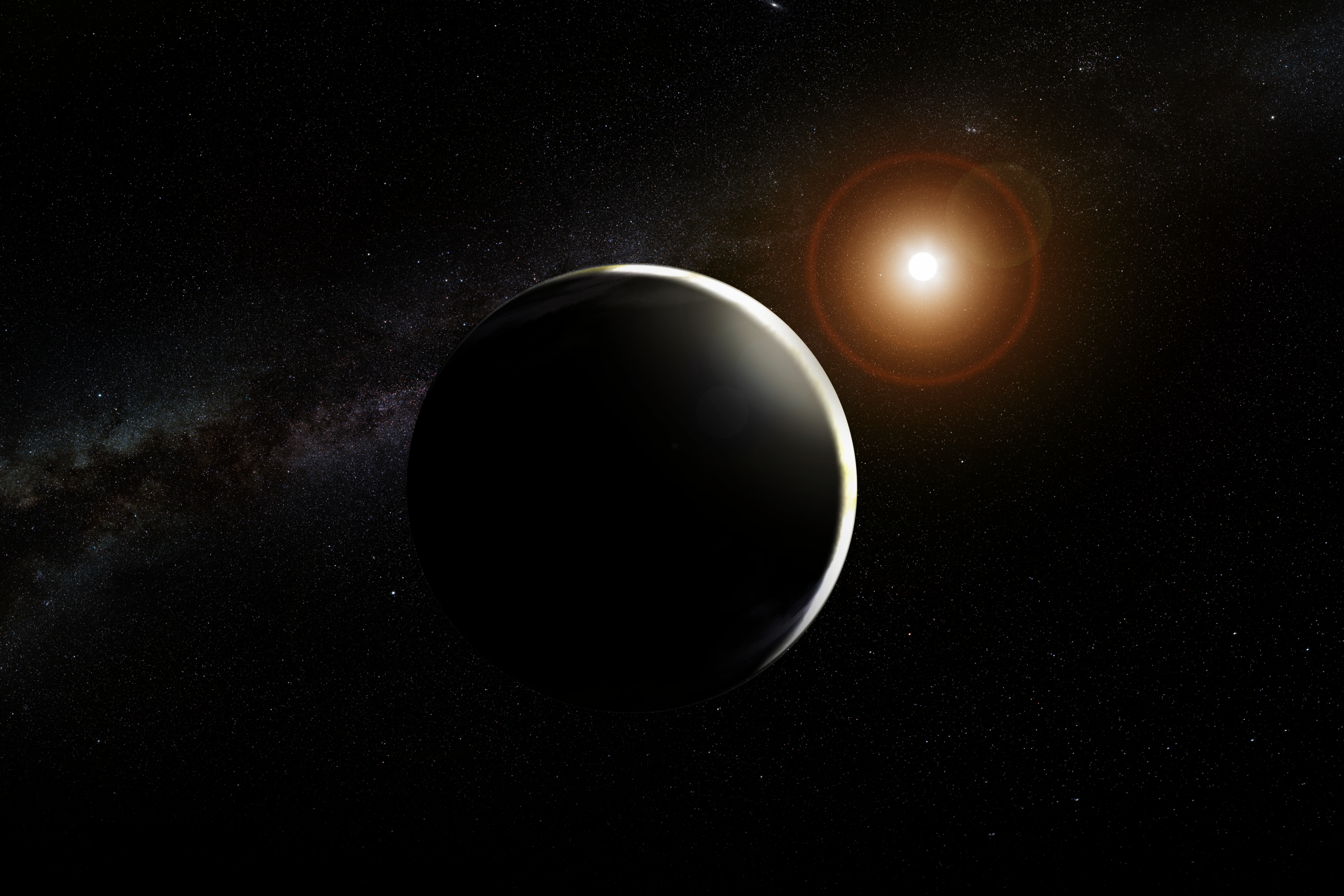
- Artist's impression of GJ 1151 and an orbiting planet

Observation data Epoch J2000.0 Equinox ICRS
- Constellation: Ursa Major
- Right ascension: 11^{h} 50^{m} 57.72053^{s}
- Declination: +48° 22′ 38.5612″
- Apparent magnitude (V): 14.008

Characteristics
- Spectral type: dM4.5
- B−V color index: 1.787

Astrometry
Radial velocity (R_{v})	−36.13±0.26 km/s
Proper motion (μ)	RA: −1545.069 mas/yr Dec.: −962.724 mas/yr
Parallax (π)	124.3378±0.0549 mas
Distance	26.23 ± 0.01 ly (8.043 ± 0.004 pc)
Absolute magnitude (M_{V})	14.482±0.022

Details
Mass	0.1639±0.0093 M_{☉}
Radius	0.1781±0.0042 R_{☉}
Luminosity (bolometric)	0.003315±0.000018 L_{☉}
Surface gravity (log g)	5.09±0.09 cgs
Temperature	3,143±26 K
Metallicity [Fe/H]	−0.12±0.10 dex
Rotation	140±10 d
Rotational velocity (v sin i)	2.0 km/s
Age	2.5 Gyr

Other designations
- GJ 1151, G 122-49, LHS 316, NLTT 28752, 2MASS J11505787+4822395, Gaia EDR3 786834302080370304

Database references
SIMBAD	data
Exoplanet Archive	data

GJ 1151 is a star located in the northern circumpolar constellation of Ursa Major at a distance of 26.2 light-years (8.0 parsecs) from the Sun. It has a reddish hue and is too faint to be visible to the naked eye with an apparent visual magnitude of 14.0. The star is moving closer with a radial velocity of −36 km/s, and has a relatively large proper motion, traversing the celestial sphere at a rate of 1.815″·yr^{−1}.

This is a small red dwarf star of spectral type dM4.5. It is 2.5 billion years old and is spinning with a projected rotational velocity of 2.0 km/s. The star has 15.4% of the mass of the Sun and 19.0% of the Sun's radius, with an effective temperature of 3,143 K.

== Planetary system ==
In 2020, astronomers announced the discovery of radio emissions from the star which are consistent with the star having a magnetic interaction with a planet approximately the size of Earth, revolving in a 1-5 day long orbit. Such an interaction would be analogous to a scaled-up version of the Jupiter-Io magnetic interaction, with GJ 1151 taking the role of Jupiter and its planet the role of Io.

Two papers published only a month apart in 2021 discussed planet detection at GJ 1151 by the radial velocity method. One claimed the detection of a planet with a minimum mass of 2.5 M_{🜨} and a period of 2 days, supporting the radio emission detection, while the other was unable to confirm this candidate planet, finding that the 2-day signal is likely caused by long-term variability, possibly connected to a more distant planet. This second study placed an upper limit of 0.7-1.2 M_{🜨} on the minimum masses of any undetected planets with periods from 1-5 days.

In 2023, a different planet was found, with a minimum mass of 10.6 M_{🜨} and a 390-day orbit, along with additional radial velocity variations. This new planet was referred to by the preprint version of the discovery paper as GJ 1151 b, but the published version of the paper, as well as the NASA Exoplanet Archive, refer to it as GJ 1151 c to differentiate it from the previous candidate. While the presence of a short-period planet associated with the radio emissions could not be completely ruled out, if such a planet exists its minimum mass must be less than 1.2 M_{🜨}.

The GJ 1151 planetary system
Companion (in order from star)	Mass	Semimajor axis (AU)	Orbital period (days)	Eccentricity	Inclination (°)	Radius
c	≥10.62+1.31 −1.47 M_{🜨}	0.5714+0.0053 −0.0064	389.7+5.4 −6.5	—	—	—

== See also ==
- List of star systems within 20–25 light-years
