= GJ 1289 =

Red dwarf

Observation data Epoch J2000 Equinox ICRS
- Constellation: Andromeda
- Right ascension: 23^{h} 43^{m} 06.31184^{s}
- Declination: +36° 32′ 13.1373″
- Apparent magnitude (V): 12.67

Characteristics
- Evolutionary stage: main sequence
- Spectral type: M4.5Ve

Astrometry
Radial velocity (R_{v})	−3.85±0.41 km/s
Proper motion (μ)	RA: +941.841 mas/yr Dec.: −151.272 mas/yr
Parallax (π)	119.5794±0.0563 mas
Distance	27.28 ± 0.01 ly (8.363 ± 0.004 pc)

Details
Mass	0.21±0.02 M_{☉}
Radius	0.233±0.005 R_{☉}
Luminosity	0.0054 L_{☉}
Surface gravity (log g)	5.06±0.05 cgs
Temperature	3296±30 K
Metallicity [Fe/H]	0.02±0.10 dex
Rotation	73.66±0.92 d
Rotational velocity (v sin i)	2.0 km/s
Age	2.6 Gyr

Other designations
- GJ 1289, G 130-4, LHS 4003, NLTT 57748, TYC 2779-1797-1

Database references
SIMBAD	data
Exoplanet Archive	data

GJ 1289 is a red dwarf star located approximately 27 light-years from the Sun in the constellation Andromeda. It is a single star of spectral class M4.5 V, with about 21% of the Sun's mass. The star hosts at least one confirmed exoplanet, GJ 1289 b, and is fully convective, making it a target for studying planetary formation around low-mass stars. Despite its slow rotation, GJ 1289 exhibits large-scale magnetic field strengths similar to those of faster-rotating M dwarfs, suggesting that the star operates a dynamo process in a regime distinct from more rapidly rotating stars. The star is predominantly poloidal with its magnetic topology varying over time, and their small-scale fields contribute more than 70% of the star's overall magnetic flux.

The GJ 1289 planetary system
Companion (in order from star)	Mass	Semimajor axis (AU)	Orbital period (days)	Eccentricity	Inclination (°)	Radius
b	≥6.27+1.23 −1.25 M_{🜨}	0.27±0.01	111.74+0.73 −0.71	0	—	—
