= Gliese 393 =

Star in the constellation Sextans

Observation data Epoch J2000 Equinox ICRS
- Constellation: Sextans
- Right ascension: 10^{h} 28^{m} 55.551^{s}
- Declination: +00° 50′ 27.60″
- Apparent magnitude (V): 9.65

Characteristics
- Spectral type: M2V
- U−B color index: 1.192
- B−V color index: 1.507±0.014

Astrometry
Radial velocity (R_{v})	+8.34±0.10 km/s
Proper motion (μ)	RA: −602.992 mas/yr Dec.: −731.882 mas/yr
Parallax (π)	142.0951±0.0212 mas
Distance	22.953 ± 0.003 ly (7.038 ± 0.001 pc)
Absolute magnitude (M_{V})	10.40

Details
Mass	0.432±0.011 M_{☉}
Radius	0.4459±0.0073 R_{☉}
Luminosity	0.02687±0.00054 L_{☉}
Surface gravity (log g)	4.88±0.07 cgs
Temperature	3,579±51 K
Metallicity [Fe/H]	−0.09±0.16 dex
Rotation	34.15±0.22 d
Rotational velocity (v sin i)	1.5 km/s
Age	3.28 Gyr

Other designations
- BD+01°2447, GJ 393, HIP 51317, LTT 12805, 2MASS J10285555+0050275

Database references
SIMBAD	data
Exoplanet Archive	data

Gliese 393, or GJ 393, is a single star with an orbiting exoplanet companion in the equatorial constellation of Sextans, positioned about 1.5° to the NNW of Beta Sextantis. At an apparent visual magnitude of 9.65, it is much too faint to be seen with the unaided eye. This star is located at a distance of 22.9 light years from the Sun based on parallax, and is drifting further away with a radial velocity of +8.3 km/s. It has a large proper motion, traversing the celestial sphere at the rate of 0.950″ per year. The net velocity of this star relative to the Sun is 32.9 km/s. It shares a similar space motion as members of the AB Doradus moving group, but is considered a random interloper.

The stellar classification of GJ 393 is M2V, indicating this is a small red dwarf star that is generating energy through core hydrogen fusion. It is rotating slowly and appears to be chromospherically inactive, suggesting it is an older star; perhaps as much as 10 billion years old. The star has 43% of the mass of the Sun and 44.6% of the Sun's radius. The metallicity, what astronomers term the abundance of heavy elements, is lower than in the Sun. It is radiating just 2.7% of the Sun's luminosity from its photosphere at an effective temperature of 3,579 K.

== Planetary system ==
In 2019, one candidate planet was detected by the radial velocity method. It is classified as a hot super-Earth, with an orbital period of one week and a semimajor axis of 8.2 Gm. Longer period signals found in the data were interpreted as stellar activity.

In 2021, the planet was confirmed as real after being detected independently in three different datasets.

The Gliese 393 planetary system
Companion (in order from star)	Mass	Semimajor axis (AU)	Orbital period (days)	Eccentricity	Inclination (°)	Radius
b	≥1.71±0.24 M_{🜨}	0.05402±0.00072	7.02679+0.00082 −0.00085	0	—	—

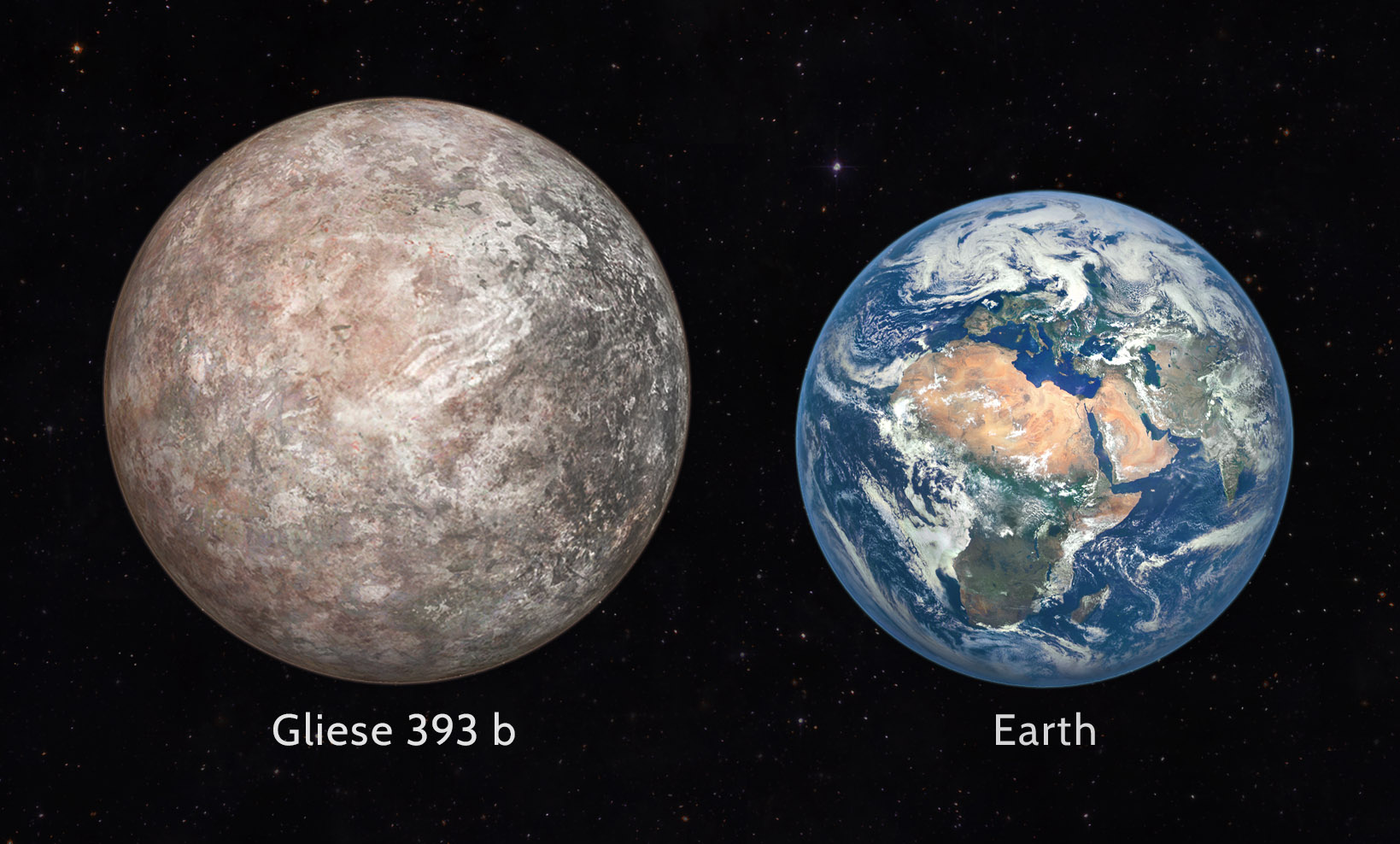
Artist's impression and size comparison of the planet Gliese 393 b with Earth, assuming Earth-like composition
