= Gliese 176 =

Star in the constellation Taurus

Observation data Epoch J2000.0 Equinox ICRS
- Constellation: Taurus
- Right ascension: 04^{h} 42^{m} 55.7750^{s}
- Declination: +18° 57′ 29.396″
- Apparent magnitude (V): 9.95

Characteristics
- Spectral type: M2V
- B−V color index: 1.523±0.025
- Variable type: None

Astrometry
Radial velocity (R_{v})	26.4105±0.0004 km/s
Proper motion (μ)	RA: +656.647 mas/yr Dec.: −1116.594 mas/yr
Parallax (π)	105.4275±0.0210 mas
Distance	30.937 ± 0.006 ly (9.485 ± 0.002 pc)
Absolute magnitude (M_{V})	10.10±0.06

Details
Mass	0.485±0.012 M_{☉}
Radius	0.474±0.015 R_{☉}
Luminosity	0.03516±0.00032 L_{☉}
Temperature	3,632+58 −56 K
Metallicity [Fe/H]	−0.1±0.2 dex
Rotation	40.00±0.11 days
Rotational velocity (v sin i)	≤0.8 km/s
Age	8.8+2.5 −2.8 Gyr

Other designations
- BD+18°683, HD 285968, HIP 21932, Ross 33, 2MASS J04425581+1857285

Database references
SIMBAD	data
Exoplanet Archive	data

Gliese 176 is a small star with an orbiting exoplanet in the constellation of Taurus. With an apparent visual magnitude of 9.95, it is too faint to be visible to the naked eye but is the nearest star in the constellation, with a distance of 30.9 light years based on parallax measurements, and is drifting further away with a heliocentric radial velocity of 26.4 km/s.

This is an M-type main-sequence star, sometimes called a red dwarf, with a stellar classification of M2V. It has 49% of the Sun's mass and 47% of the radius of the Sun. The star is radiating just 3.5% of the luminosity of the Sun from its photosphere at an effective temperature of 3,632 K. It is estimated to be around nine billion years old, and is spinning slowly with a rotation period of 40 days. The star is orbited by a Super-Earth.

== Planetary system ==
A planetary companion to Gliese 176 was announced in 2008. Radial velocity observations with the Hobby-Eberly Telescope (HET) showed a 10.24-day periodicity, which was interpreted as being caused by a planet. With a semi-amplitude of 11.6 m/s, its minimum mass equated to 24.5 Earth masses, or approximately 1.4 Neptune masses.

Observations with the HARPS spectrograph could not confirm the 10.24-day variation. Instead, two other periodicities were detected at 8.78 and 40.0 days, with amplitudes below the HET observational errors. The 40-day variation coincides with the rotational period of the star and is therefore caused by activity, but the shorter-period variation is not explained by activity and is therefore caused by a planet. Its semi-amplitude of 4.1 m/s corresponds to a minimum mass of 8.4 Earth masses, making the planet a Super-Earth.

In an independent study, observations with Keck-HIRES also failed to confirm the 10.24-day signal. An 8.77-day periodicity - corresponding to the planet announced by the HARPS team - was detected to intermediate significance, though it was not deemed significant enough to claim a planetary cause with their data alone.

The Gliese 176 planetary system
Companion (in order from star)	Mass	Semimajor axis (AU)	Orbital period (days)	Eccentricity	Inclination (°)	Radius
b	≥9.06+1.54 −0.70 M_{🜨}	0.066±0.001	8.776+0.001 −0.002	0.148+0.249 −0.036	—	—

== See also ==
- List of extrasolar planets
- Gliese 674
