= Gliese 433 =

Star in the constellation Hydra

Observation data Epoch J2000.0 Equinox ICRS
- Constellation: Hydra
- Right ascension: 11^{h} 35^{m} 26.94777^{s}
- Declination: −32° 32′ 23.8842″
- Apparent magnitude (V): 9.81

Characteristics
- Spectral type: M2V
- Apparent magnitude (U): 12.508
- Apparent magnitude (B): 11.299
- Apparent magnitude (R): 8.82
- Apparent magnitude (I): 7.664
- Apparent magnitude (J): 6.471
- Apparent magnitude (H): 5.856±0.036
- Apparent magnitude (K): 5.623±0.021
- U−B color index: 1.23
- B−V color index: 1.489±0.004
- V−R color index: 0.99
- R−I color index: 1.16

Astrometry
Radial velocity (R_{v})	+17.986±0.0006 km/s
Proper motion (μ)	RA: −71.060(20) mas/yr Dec.: −850.592(16) mas/yr
Parallax (π)	110.1711±0.0204 mas
Distance	29.605 ± 0.005 ly (9.077 ± 0.002 pc)
Absolute magnitude (M_{V})	10.07

Details
Mass	0.48 M_{☉}
Radius	0.529±0.021 R_{☉}
Luminosity	0.034 L_{☉}
Habitable zone inner limit	0.186 AU
Habitable zone outer limit	0.362 AU
Surface gravity (log g)	4.81±0.14 cgs
Temperature	3,445±50 K
Metallicity [Fe/H]	−0.02±0.05 dex
Rotation	73.2±16.0 d
Rotational velocity (v sin i)	1.0 km/s

Other designations
- CD−31 9113, GJ 433, HIP 56528, SAO 202602, LHS 2429, LTT 4290, NLTT 27914, 2MASS J11352695-3232232

Database references
SIMBAD	data
Exoplanet Archive	data
ARICNS	data

Gliese 433 is a dim red dwarf star with multiple exoplanetary companions, located in the equatorial constellation of Hydra. The system is located at a distance of 29.6 light-years from the Sun based on parallax measurements, and it is receding with a radial velocity of +18 km/s. Based on its motion through space, this is an old disk star. It is too faint to be viewed with the naked eye, having an apparent visual magnitude of 9.81 and an absolute magnitude of 10.07.

This is a small M-type main-sequence star with a stellar classification of M2V. It is an older star with a rotation period of roughly 73 days and a below average activity level for stars of its mass. The star has 48% of the mass and 53% of the radius of the Sun. It is radiating just 3.4% of the luminosity of the Sun from its photosphere at an effective temperature of 3,445 K.

== Planetary system ==
Gliese 433 b is an extrasolar planet which orbits the star Gliese 433. This planet is a super-Earth with at least six times the mass of Earth and takes approximately seven days to orbit the star at a semimajor axis of approximately 0.056 AU. The planet was announced in a press release in October 2009, but no discovery paper at the time was made available. A study described in a 2014 paper by Tuomi et al. confirmed both Gliese 433 b and another candidate planet, previously detected in 2012, Gliese 433 c.

Gliese 433 d, whose discovery was published in January 2020, is similar in mass to Gliese 433 b but orbits slightly further out, actually within the optimistic habitable zone of the star, but it is still too close to the star, and therefore too warm, to be inside the narrower boundaries of the conservative habitable zone.

Gliese 433 c orbits the furthest out from the star. As of 2020 it is the nearest, widest orbiting, and coldest Neptune-like planet yet detected. It is also notable in having an unusually eccentric orbit for a large planet so far from its parent single star and other planets.

A survey using the Herschel Telescope found an infrared excess around the star, indicating the presence of an orbiting circumstellar disk. This feature is unresolved but the mean temperature of 30 K puts it somewhere within a 16 AU radius from the host star.

The Gliese 433 planetary system
Companion (in order from star)	Mass	Semimajor axis (AU)	Orbital period (days)	Eccentricity	Inclination (°)	Radius
b	≥6.043±0.597 M_{🜨}	0.062±0.002	7.3705±0.0005	0.04±0.03	—	—
d	≥5.223±0.921 M_{🜨}	0.178±0.006	36.059±0.016	0.07±0.05	—	—
c	≥32.422±6.329 M_{🜨}	4.819±0.417	5,094.105±608.617	0.12±0.07	—	—

== See also ==
- List of star systems within 25–30 light-years
- Groombridge 34 A
- List of exoplanets discovered in 2011 - Gliese 433 b
- List of exoplanets discovered in 2014 - Gliese 433 c
- List of exoplanets discovered in 2020 - Gliese 433 d
