= GJ 1289 b =

Sub-Neptune exoplanet

Discovery
- Discovery site: Canada–France–Hawaii Telescope
- Discovery date: 2024

Orbital characteristics
- Orbital period (sidereal): 111.74 days

Physical characteristics
- Mass: 6.27 M_{🜨} 0.020 M_{J}

GJ 1289 b is a sub-Neptune exoplanet orbiting the red dwarf star GJ 1289, located approximately 8.86 parsecs (≈29 light-years) from the Sun. It was discovered using radial-velocity measurements with the near-infrared spectropolarimeter SPIRou at the Canada–France–Hawaii Telescope over multiple years, revealing a minimum mass of 6.27 ± 1.25 Earth masses and a nearly circular orbit with a period of 111.74 days. The host star, an M4.5V fully convective red dwarf with a mass of 0.21 solar masses, exhibits a strong large-scale dipolar magnetic field of 200–240 G and a rotation period of ~73.7 days, which is distinct from the planet's orbital period.

The planet's orbital distance places it beyond the conventional habitable zone of its cool, low-luminosity host, though it may still have a temperate atmosphere, making it a target for further study. Its discovery is notable for demonstrating the detection of planets around fully convective M dwarfs, whose magnetic activity differs significantly from that of partly convective stars, and for showing that low-amplitude radial-velocity signals can be reliably extracted even in the presence of strong stellar magnetic fields.
