= Cosmic shoreline =

Planetary atmosphere boundary

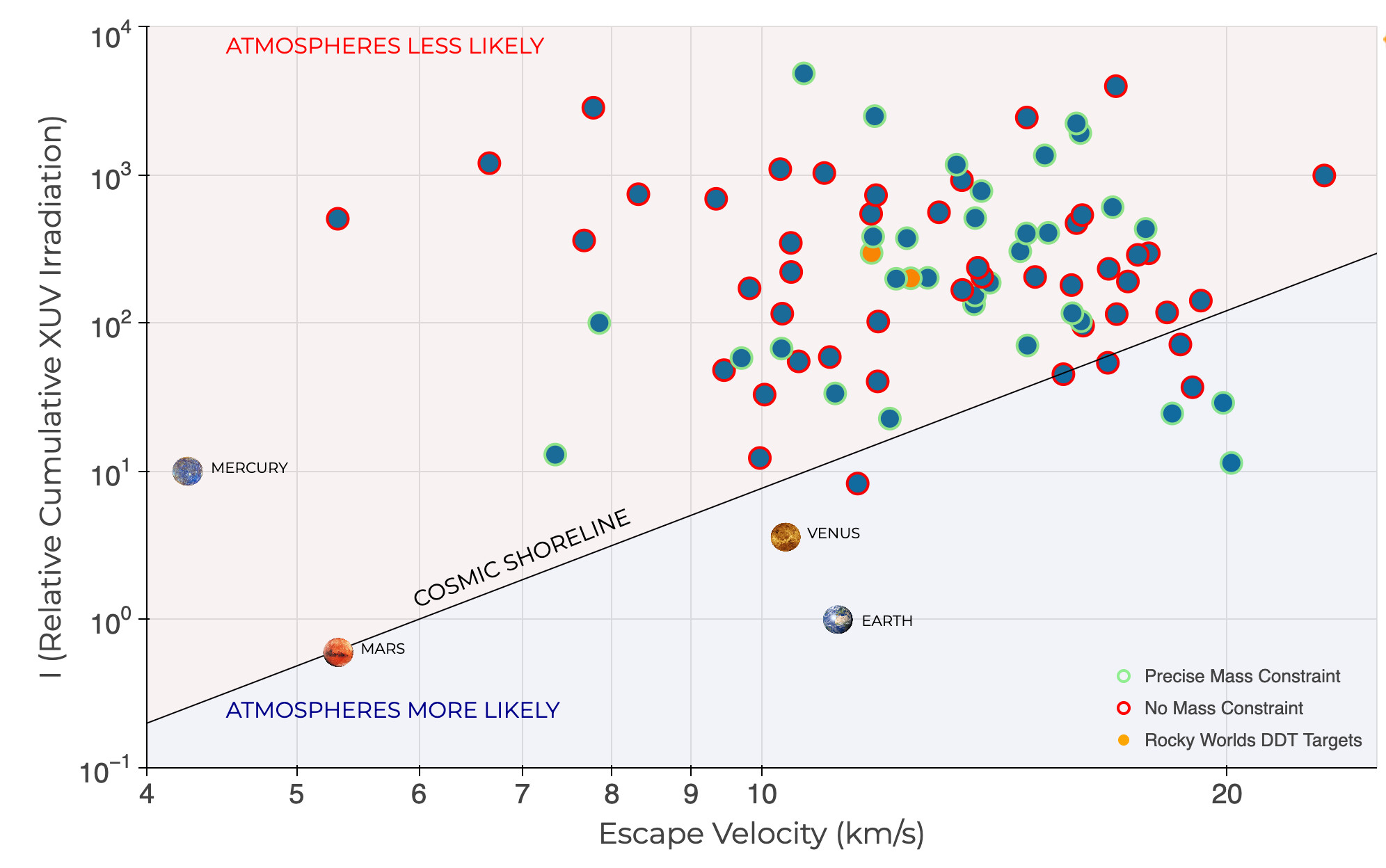
Bodies plotted by insolation and escape velocity form a rough boundary known as the "cosmic shoreline".

The cosmic shoreline is a concept in planetary science that describes an empirical boundary between planetary bodies that are able to retain significant atmosphere and those that cannot. The concept compares a planet's escape velocity with its insolation (energy received by the planet from its local star). When planets and moons in our Solar System are plotted in accordance with these two parameters, objects with thick atmospheres (such as Saturn and Jupiter) appear on one side, while airless planets with no (or very little) atmosphere appear on the other, forming a rough dividing line known as the "shoreline".

== See also ==
- Atmospheric escape
