= GJ 3323 =

Star in the constellation Eridanus

- Location of GJ 3323 in the constellation Eridanus

Observation data Epoch J2000 Equinox ICRS
- Constellation: Eridanus
- Right ascension: 05^{h} 01^{m} 57.42613^{s}
- Declination: −06° 56′ 46.3763″
- Apparent magnitude (V): 12.20

Characteristics
- Spectral type: M4.0Ve
- B−V color index: +1.72

Astrometry
Radial velocity (R_{v})	42.309±0.0809 km/s
Proper motion (μ)	RA: −551.746 mas/yr Dec.: −533.648 mas/yr
Parallax (π)	186.0466±0.0277 mas
Distance	17.531 ± 0.003 ly (5.3750 ± 0.0008 pc)
Absolute magnitude (M_{V})	13.57

Details
Mass	0.1705±0.0044 M_{☉}
Radius	0.1862±0.0059 R_{☉}
Luminosity	0.003654±0.000052 L_{☉}
Habitable zone inner limit	0.060 AU
Habitable zone outer limit	0.119 AU
Surface gravity (log g)	5.07±0.07 cgs
Temperature	3,288±51 K
Metallicity [Fe/H]	+0.01±0.16 dex
Rotation	88.50 days
Rotational velocity (v sin i)	1.0±0.8 km/s

Other designations
- GJ 3323, LHS 1723, NLTT 14393, 2MASS J05015746-0656459

Database references
SIMBAD	data
Exoplanet Archive	data

GJ 3323, also known as LHS 1723, is a nearby star. It is located in the equatorial constellation Eridanus, about 0.4° to the northwest of the naked eye star Psi Eridani. It is invisible to the naked eye with an apparent visual magnitude 12.20. Parallax measurements give a distance of 17.5 light-years (5.4 parsecs). It is drifting further away with a radial velocity of +42.3 km/s. Roughly 104,000 years ago, the star is believed to have come to within 7.34 ± 0.16 light-years of the Solar System.

The stellar classification of GJ 3323 is M4.0Ve, indicating that it is a red dwarf, with emission lines appearing in its spectrum. It is fully convective and a source of X-ray emission. The star has 17% of the Sun's mass, 19% of the radius of the Sun, and just 0.4% of the Sun's luminosity.

== History of observations ==
The discovery name of this star is LP 656-38, which indicates that its discovery was published between 1963 and 1981 in University of Minnesota, Minneapolis. "LP" means "Luyten, Palomar".

GJ 3323 is known at least from 1979, when catalogues of high proper motion objects LHS and NLTT were published by Willem Jacob Luyten, and this object was included to these catalogues.

=== Distance measurement ===
In 1982, Wilhelm Gliese published a photometric distance of GJ 3323 (161 mas), and in 1991 it was included in the 3rd preliminary version of catalogue of nearby stars by Gliese and Jahreiss as NN 3323 (also designated as GJ 3323) with photometric parallax 163.0±26.0 mas.

Its trigonometric parallax remained unknown until 2006, when it was published by the RECONS team. The parallax was 187.92±1.26 mas.

== Planetary system ==
On March 15, 2017, two planets orbiting GJ 3323 were detected by the HARPS telescope, although the discovery team considers GJ 3323 c a planet candidate.

The GJ 3323 planetary system
Companion (in order from star)	Mass	Semimajor axis (AU)	Orbital period (days)	Eccentricity	Inclination (°)	Radius
b	≥2.02+0.26 −0.25 M_{🜨}	0.03282+0.00054 −0.00056	5.3636±0.0007	0.23±0.11	—	—
c	≥2.31+0.50 −0.49 M_{🜨}	0.1264+0.0021 −0.0022	40.54+0.21 −0.19	0.17+0.21 −0.12	—	—
