= HN Librae =

Star in the constellation Libra

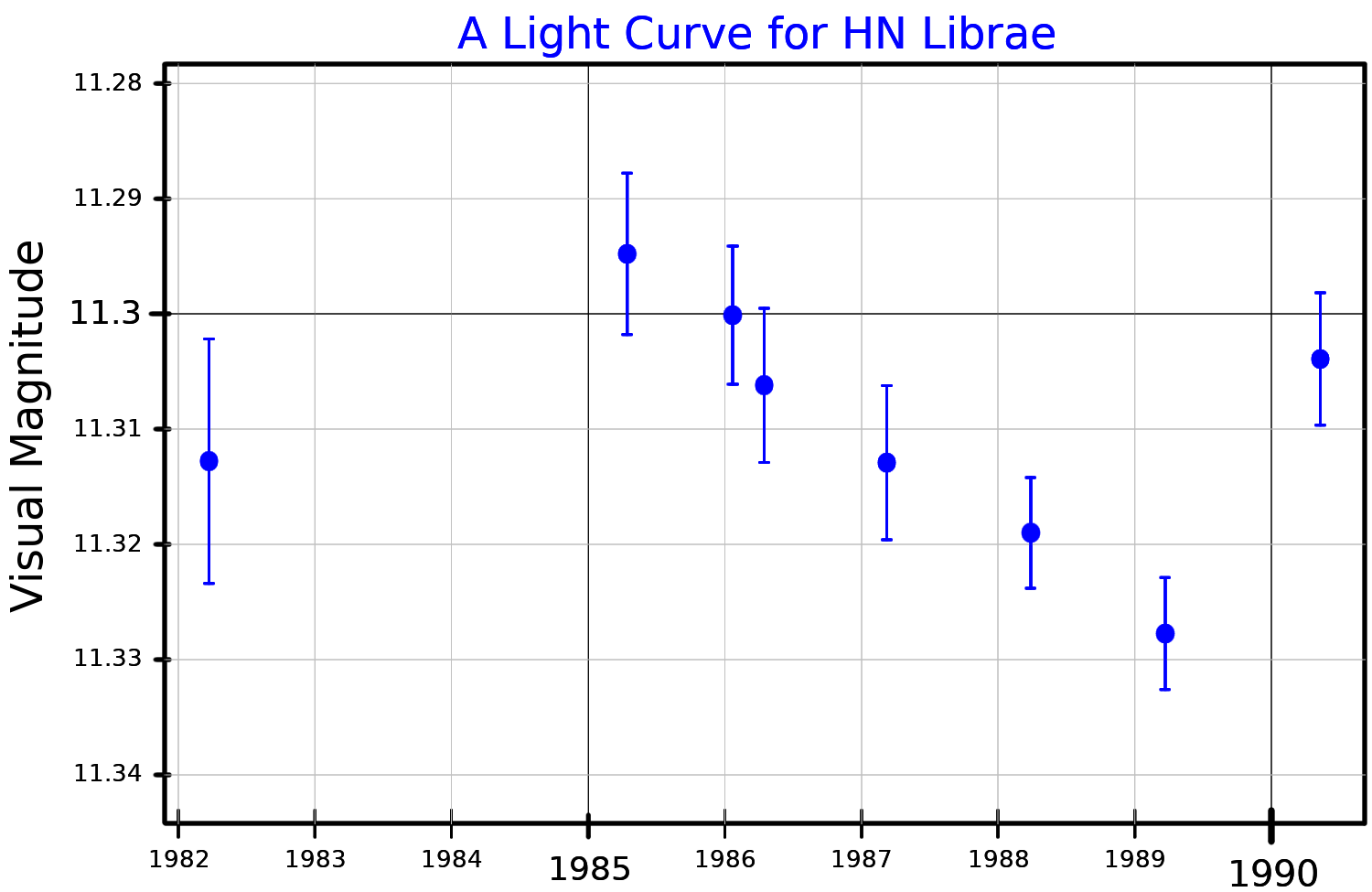
- A visual band light curve for HN Librae, adapted from Weis (1994)

Observation data Epoch J2000.0 Equinox ICRS
- Constellation: Libra
- Right ascension: 14^{h} 34^{m} 16.81166^{s}
- Declination: −12° 31′ 10.4145″
- Apparent magnitude (V): 11.32

Characteristics
- Spectral type: M4.0V
- B−V color index: 1.633±0.052
- Variable type: BY Dra

Astrometry
Radial velocity (R_{v})	−1.36±0.20 km/s
Proper motion (μ)	RA: −355.138 mas/yr Dec.: 593.040 mas/yr
Parallax (π)	159.9225±0.0546 mas
Distance	20.395 ± 0.007 ly (6.253 ± 0.002 pc)
Absolute magnitude (M_{V})	12.41

Details
Mass	0.291±0.013 M_{☉}
Radius	0.299±0.009 R_{☉}
Luminosity (bolometric)	0.010106±0.000069 L_{☉}
Surface gravity (log g)	4.76±0.13 cgs
Temperature	3347±50 K
Metallicity [Fe/H]	−0.18±0.15 dex
Rotation	96±2 d
Rotational velocity (v sin i)	<2.0 km/s
Age	0.8–8.0 Gyr

Other designations
- HN Lib, BD−11 3759, GJ 555, HIP 71253, Ci 20 870, LFT 1120, LHS 2945, LPM 532, LTT 5759, NLTT 37751, PLX 3296, PM 14316-1219, Wolf 1481, TYC 5572-804-1, GSC 05572-00804, 2MASS J14341683-1231106

Database references
SIMBAD	data
Exoplanet Archive	data
- Location of HN Librae in the constellation Libra

HN Librae, also known as Gliese 555, is a red dwarf with at least one orbiting exoplanet in the constellation Libra. With an apparent visual magnitude of 11.32, it can only be viewed through a telescope. The system is located at a distance of 20.4 light years (6.25 parsecs) based on parallax measurements, but is drifting closer to the Sun with a radial velocity of −1.4 km/s. It does not appear to belong to any known stellar moving group or association.

This is an M-type main-sequence star, a red dwarf, with a stellar classification of M4.0V. The chromosphere of this star is weakly active, causing starspots that vary the stellar luminosity as it rotates. It has 29% of the mass of the Sun and 30% of the Sun's girth. On average, the star is radiating just 1% of the luminosity of the Sun from its photosphere at an effective temperature of 3,347 K. The star is spinning slowly with a rotation period of around 96 days.

== Planetary system ==
In 2019, one planet candidate detected by radial velocity was reported in a preprint (never accepted for publication as of 2024), among 118 planets around M dwarf stars. This would have a minimum mass about 30 times that of Earth and orbit with a period of about 450 days.

However, later radial velocity observations by the CARMENES survey published in 2023 did not confirm a planet at this period, but instead found a different planet. This is a super-Earth or mini-Neptune (the discovery paper uses the term "sub-Neptune") with a minimum mass of 5.5 Earths and a period of 36 days, placing it within the habitable zone. A second planet candidate was also found, with a minimum mass of 9.7 Earths and a period of 113 days, but this signal could not be confirmed as having a planetary origin due to its similarity to the rotation period of the star.

The HN Librae planetary system
Companion (in order from star)	Mass	Semimajor axis (AU)	Orbital period (days)	Eccentricity	Inclination (°)	Radius
b	≥5.46±0.75 M_{🜨}	0.1417±0.0023	36.116+0.027 −0.029	0.079+0.090 −0.055	—	—
c (unconfirmed)	≥9.7±1.9 M_{🜨}	0.3040+0.0048 −0.0051	113.46+0.19 −0.20	—	—	—
