= List of potentially habitable exoplanets =

The following list includes potentially habitable exoplanets. It is mostly based on estimates of habitability by the Habitable Worlds Catalog (HWC), and data from the NASA Exoplanet Archive. The HWC is maintained by the Planetary Habitability Laboratory at the University of Puerto Rico at Arecibo.

Surface planetary habitability is thought to require an orbit at the right distance from the host star for liquid surface water to be present, in addition to various geophysical and geodynamical aspects, atmospheric density, radiation type and intensity, and the host star's plasma environment.

== Main list ==
This is a list of confirmed exoplanets within the circumstellar habitable zone that are either under 10 Earth masses or smaller than 2.5 Earth radii and thus have a chance of being rocky. Note that inclusion on this list does not guarantee habitability, and in particular the larger planets are less likely to have a rocky composition and more likely to be sub-Neptunes. Earth is included for both comparison and reference, while Venus and Mars are included for reference only.

Note that mass and radius values prefixed with "~" have not been measured, but are predicted from a mass–radius relationship.

Object	Star	Star type	Mass (M_{⊕})	Radius (R_{⊕})	Density (g/cm^{3})	Flux (F_{⊕})	T_{eq} (K)	Period (days)	Distance (ly)	Refs/notes
Earth (reported for reference)	Sun	G2V	1.00	1.00	5.514	1.00	255	365.25	0	Only planet confirmed to support life
Venus (reported for reference)	Sun	G2V	0.815	0.950	5.243	1.911	244.261	224.70	0.00000404–0.0000276	
Mars (reported for reference)	Sun	G2V	0.107	0.533	3.934	0.431	209.8	686.98	0.00000577–0.0000424	
55 Cancri Bc	55 Cancri B	M4V	≥5.3	—	—	0.3	200	33.7	40.9	
Gliese 12 b	Gliese 12	M4V	0.71 or 0.95	0.904+0.037 −0.034	5.3 or 7.1	1.6±0.2	315	12.7	39.7	Near inner edge of HZ, might resemble Venus
Gliese 163 c	Gliese 163	M3V	≥6.80	—	—	1.25	277	25.6	49	
Gliese 180 d	Gliese 180	M2V	≥7.56	—	—	0.26	—	106.3	39	
Gliese 251 c	Gliese 251	M3V	≥3.84	—	—	0.40	—	53.6	18.2	
Gliese 357 d	Gliese 357	M2V	≥6.10	—	—	0.38	200	55.7	31	
Gliese 433 d	Gliese 433	M2V	≥5.22	—	—	1.06	—	36.1	29.6	
Gliese 514 b	Gliese 514	M1V	≥5.20	—	—	0.28+0.51 −0.166	202	140.4	25	Highly eccentric
Gliese 555 b	Gliese 555	M4V	≥5.46	—	—	0.5	214	36.2	20.4	
Gliese 625 b	Gliese 625	M2V	≥2.82	—	—		—	14.628	21.1	Likely too hot
Gliese 667 Cc	Gliese 667 C	M1V	≥3.81	~1.54	—	0.88	277	28.1	23.62	
Gliese 887 d	Gliese 887	M0V	≥6.1	—	—	0.82		50.8	10.7	
GJ 1002 b	GJ 1002	M5V	≥1.08	~1.03	—	0.67	231	10.3	15.8	
GJ 1002 c	GJ 1002	M5V	≥1.36	1.1	—	0.26	182	21.2	15.8	
GJ 1061 c	GJ 1061	M5V	1.81+0.13 −0.11	~1.18	—	1.45	275	6.7	12	
GJ 1061 d	GJ 1061	M5V	1.67+0.17 −0.16	~1.16	—	0.69	218	13.0	12	
GJ 3293 d	GJ 3293	M2V	≥7.60	—	—	0.59	223	48.1	66	
GJ 3378 b	GJ 3378	M4V	≥2.3	—	—			21.45	25.2	Near the airless zone of cosmic shoreline
GJ 3998 d	GJ 3998	M1V	≥6.07	—	—		—	41.8	58	
HD 20794 d	HD 20794	G6V	≥5.82	—	—	—	–	647.6	19.7	Highly eccentric orbit
HD 216520 c	HD 216520	K0V	≥9.44	—	—	1.28	—	154.4	64	
HIP 38594 b	HIP 38594	M0V	≥8.10	—	—	1.34	—	60.7	58	
K2-72e	K2-72	M2V	~2.21	1.29	—	1.30	261	24.2	217	
K2-155d	K2-155	K?V	4.27	1.64	—	—	289	40.6	290	
K2-288Bb	K2-288 B	M3V	4.27	1.91	—	0.44	207	31.4	214	
K2-332 b	K2-332	M3.5V	—	2.20	—	1.17	—	17.7	402	
Kepler-22b	Kepler-22	G5V	<9.1	2.38	—	1.10	261	289.9	635	
Kepler-62e	Kepler-62	K2V	4.5+14.2 −2.6	1.61	—	1.15	264	122.4	981	
Kepler-62f	Kepler-62	K2V	2.8±0.4	1.41	—	0.41	204	267.3	981	
Kepler-155c	Kepler-155	M0V	—	2.24	—	1.05	—	52.7	957	
Kepler-174d	Kepler-174	K3V	—	2.19	—	0.59	206	247.4	1,254	
Kepler-283c	Kepler-283	K5V	—	1.82	—	0.89	248	92.7	1,526	
Kepler-296e	Kepler-296	K7V	2.96	1.52	—	1.41	276	34.1	737	
Kepler-296f	Kepler-296	K7V	—	1.80	—	0.44	225	63.3	737	
Kepler-440b	Kepler-440	K6V	—	1.91	—	1.44	273	101.1	981	
Kepler-442b	Kepler-442	K5V	2.36+5.9 −1.3	1.35	—	0.70	233	112.3	1,193	
Kepler-443b	Kepler-443	K3V	—	2.35	—	0.89	247	177.7	2,615	
Kepler-705b	Kepler-705	M?V	—	2.11	—	0.77	243	56.1	903	
Kepler-725 c	Kepler-725	G9V	9.7	—	—	—		207.5	2,526	Eccentric orbit
Kepler-1229b	Kepler-1229	M?V	2.540	1.40	—	0.32	213	86.8	865	
Kepler-1410b	Kepler-1410	K?V	—	1.78	—	1.07	274	60.9	1,196	
Kepler-1455b	Kepler-1455	K?V	—	2.10	—	1.30		49.3	1,280	
Kepler-1540b	Kepler-1540	K?V	—	2.49	—	0.78	250	125.4	799	
Kepler-1544 b	Kepler-1544	K2V	—	1.78	—	0.84	248	168.8	1,092	
Kepler-1606b	Kepler-1606	G7V	—	2.07	—	1.64	277	196.4	2,710	
Kepler-1649c	Kepler-1649	M5V	1.20	1.06	—	0.75	237	19.5	301	
Kepler-1652b	Kepler-1652	M?V	—	1.60	—	0.84	244	38.1	822	
Kepler-1653b	Kepler-1653	K?V	—	2.17	—	1.04	258	140.3	2,461	
Kepler-1701b	Kepler-1701	K?V	—	2.22	—	1.42	275	169.1	1,904	
LHS 1140 b	LHS 1140	M4V	5.60	1.73	5.9±0.3	0.43	226	24.7	49	Likely an ocean world with an atmosphere
LP 890-9 c	LP 890-9	M6V	—	1.37	—	0.91	272	8.46	105	
Luyten b	Luyten's Star	M3V	≥2.89	~1.35	—	1.06	258	18.65	12.3	
Proxima Centauri b	Proxima Centauri	M5V	≥1.07	1.17±0.23	—	0.70	228	11.186	4.25	Affected by stellar flare, possibly affected by high radiation flux
Ross 128 b	Ross 128	M4V	≥1.40	~1.80	—	1.48	280	9.87	11.0	
Ross 508 b	Ross 508	M4V	≥4.00	—	—	1.32	—	10.8	37	
Struve 2398 Bc	Struve 2398	M4V	≥3.4	—	—	0.47		37.9	11.5	
Teegarden's Star b	Teegarden's Star	M7V	≥1.05	~1.02	—	1.15	264	4.91	12.5	
Teegarden's Star c	Teegarden's Star	M7V	≥1.11	~1.04	—	0.37	199	11.4	12.5	
L 98-59 f	L 98-59	M3V	≥2.97	—	—	>1	289	23.07	34.6	
TOI-700 d	TOI-700	M2V	~1.72	1.14	—	0.87	246	37.4	101	
TOI-700 e	TOI-700	M2V	0.82	0.95	—	1.27	273	27.8	101	
TOI-715 b	TOI-715	M4V	3.02	1.55	—	0.67	234	19.29	137	
TOI-2094 Ab	TOI-2094	M3V		1.90	—	0.98		18.8	164	
TOI-2257 b	TOI-2257	M3V	5.712+4.288 −2.311	2.20	—	0.57+1.68 −0.31	256+61 −17	35.2	188	Highly eccentric
TOI-2285 b	TOI-2285	M4V	4.1	1.75	—	—	358	27	137	Likely too hot
TOI-7166 b	TOI-7166	M4V		2.01	—	1.07	249	12.9	115	
TRAPPIST-1e	TRAPPIST-1	M8V	0.69	0.92	5.65	0.65	230	6.1	41	Confirmed to be rocky. Possibly has an atmosphere.
TRAPPIST-1f	TRAPPIST-1	M8V	1.04	1.04	3.3 ± 0.9	0.37	200	9.2	41	Confirmed to be rocky
TRAPPIST-1g	TRAPPIST-1	M8V	1.32	1.13	4.186	0.25	182	12.4	41	Confirmed to be rocky
Wolf 1069 b	Wolf 1069	M5V	≥1.26	~1.08	—	0.65	250	15.6	31.2	
Wolf 1061c	Wolf 1061	M3V	≥3.41	~1.60	—	1.30	271	17.9	13.8	

== Current candidates ==
This is a list of notable exoplanets within the circumstellar habitable zone that are either under 10 Earth masses or smaller than 2.5 Earth radii and have not yet been confirmed. Earth is included for both comparison and reference, while Venus and Mars are included for reference only.

Object	Star	Star type	Mass (M_{⊕})	Radius (R_{⊕})	Density (g/cm^{3})	Flux (F_{⊕})	T_{eq} (K)	Period (days)	Distance (ly)	Refs/notes
Earth (reported for reference)	Sun	G2V	1.00	1.00	5.514	1.00	255	365.25	0	Only planet confirmed to support life
Venus (reported for reference)	Sun	G2V	0.815	0.950	5.243	1.911	244.261	224.70	0.00000404–0.0000276	
Mars (reported for reference)	Sun	G2V	0.107	0.533	3.934	0.431	209.8	686.98	0.00000577–0.0000424	
Gliese 180 c	Gliese 180	M2V	≥6.40	—	—	0.78	239	24.3	39	
HD 40307 g	HD 40307	K2V	≥7.09	—	—	0.67	226	197.8	42	
HD 137010 b	HD 137010	K3V		1.06	—	0.29		355	146	
Kepler-186f	Kepler-186	M1V	1.44+2.33 −1.12	1.17	—	0.29	188	129.9	579	
Kepler-452b	Kepler-452	G2V	~5	1.63	—	1.11	261	384.8	1,799	
KOI-4878.01	KOI-4878	F8V	~1.9+1.1 −0.5	1.05	—	1.04+1.1 −0.34	257	449.0	1,075	
KOI-5715.01	KOI-5715	K3V	—	1.93			260	190	2,964	
LTT 1445 Ad	LTT 1445A	M2V	≥2.72	—	—	—		24.3	22.4	
Tau Ceti f	Tau Ceti	G8V	≥3.93	—	—	0.27	190	642	11.9	Has been only in HZ for less than 1 Gya
TOI-715.02	TOI-715	M4V		1.066±0.092		0.48+0.12 −0.17		25.6	137	
WD 1054–226 b	WD 1054–226	DAZ	~1	—	—			1.04	118	The surface temperature might be high enough for habitability

== Previous candidates ==
Some habitable exoplanets detected by radial velocity were considered as stellar artifacts by some studies. These include Gliese 581 d and g, Gliese 667 Ce and f, Gliese 682 b and c, Kapteyn b, Gliese 229 Ac, HD 85512 b and Gliese 832 c.

The potentially habitable "planet" Gliese 48 b was added to the NASA Exoplanet Archive before being retracted by its original authors due to an error in data extraction and processing.

Several other planets, such as Gliese 180 b, also appear to be examples of planets once considered potentially habitable but later found to be interior to the habitable zone. Similarly, Tau Ceti e (Note: The existence of Tau Ceti e is considered disproven, see and), HD 85512 b and Kepler-69c were thought to be likely habitable, but with improved models of the circumstellar habitable zone, PHL does not consider it potentially habitable. Kepler-438b was also initially considered potentially habitable; however, it was later found to be a subject of powerful flares that can strip a planet of its atmosphere, so it is now considered non-habitable.

While K2-3d and K2-18b were initially deemed as potentially habitable - and the latter remains listed in the HWC, further studies have shown them to be gaseous sub-Neptunes rather than Hycean planets, and thus are unlikely to be habitable.

Kepler-1638b was thought to be a possibly habitable planet with a radius smaller than 2 R_{🜨} after the validation. However based on the later measurement of host star parallax by Gaia, the radius of the planet was revised upward to 3.226+0.201
−0.315 R_{🜨}, meaning it is more likely an ice giant like Neptune with poor prospect for habitability.

KOI-1686.01 was also considered a potentially habitable exoplanet after its detection in 2011, until proven a false positive by NASA in 2015. Several other KOIs, like Kepler-577b and Kepler-1649b, were considered potentially habitable prior to confirmation, but with new data are no longer considered habitable.

TRAPPIST-1 d was considered to be potentially habitable until JWST/NIRSpec data found little evidence for an atmosphere with Earth-like surface pressure, highly likely ruling out habitability.

== Extrasolar candidates for liquid water ==
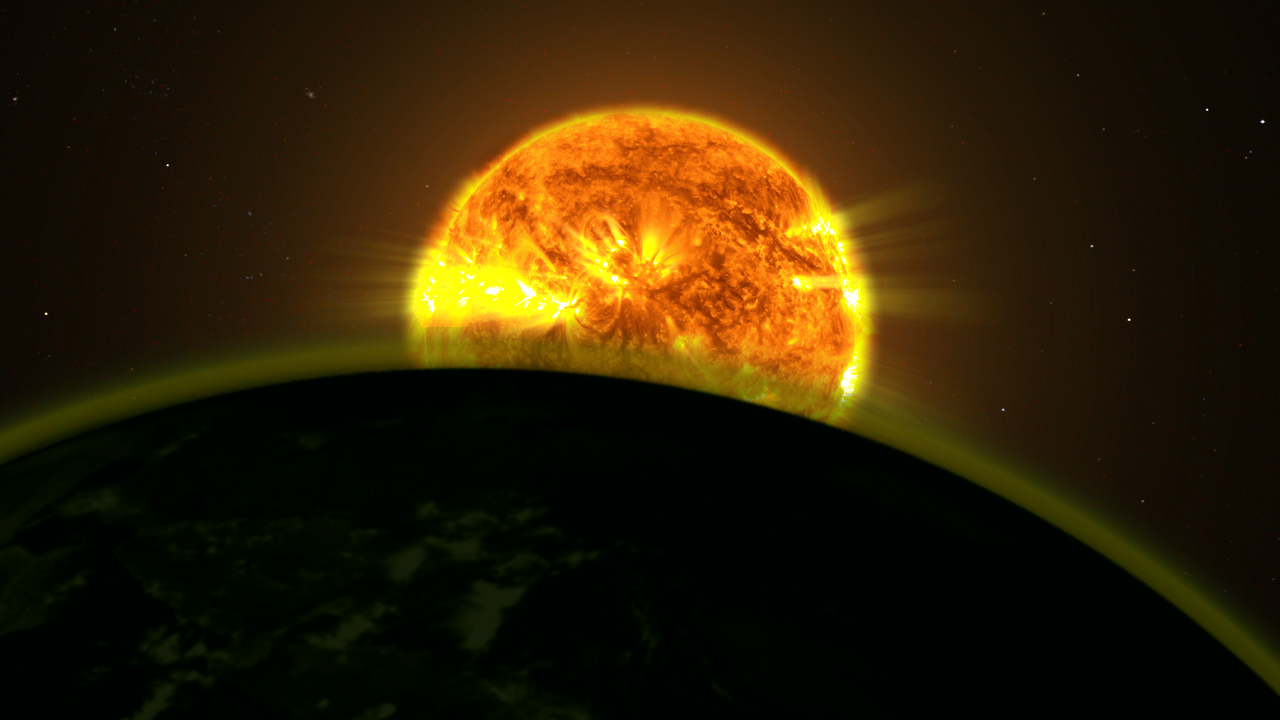
Artist's illustration of the signatures of water in exoplanet atmospheres by Hubble. Water vapor and ice have been found to be common elements of extraterrestrial atmospheres, however water in liquid form has not been confirmed beyond the Earth.

Extraterrestrial liquid water has not yet been confirmed to exist. Most known extrasolar planetary systems appear to have very different compositions from the Solar System, though there is sampling bias arising from the detection methods.

The goal of current searches is to find Earth-sized planets in the habitable zone of their planetary systems (also called the Goldilocks zone). Planets with oceans could include Earth-sized moons of giant planets, though it remains speculative whether such 'moons' really exist. The Kepler telescope might be sensitive enough to detect them. But there is evidence that rocky planets hosting water may be commonplace throughout the Milky Way.

In June 2020, NASA scientists reported that it is likely that exoplanets with oceans may be common in the Milky Way galaxy, based on mathematical modeling studies.

The following list contains candidates that meet the following criteria:

- Confirmed object of Earth mass or greater (Note: Less massive objects' gravity may be too weak to retain water) orbiting within a circumstellar habitable zone (CHZ)
- May not be a star
- Has been studied for more than a year
- Confirmed surface with strong evidence for it being either solid or liquid
- Water vapour detected in its atmosphere
- Gravitational, radio or differentation models predict a wet stratum

These include:

- Proxima Centauri b: , the nearest known exoplanet, is in the habitable zone of its host star, and might contain liquid water. More details about the planet's physical conditions are needed for a proper evaluation of its habitability.
- Gliese 667 Cc, in a tight 28-day orbit of a dim red star, must receive 90% of the light that Earth receives, but most of its incoming light is in the infrared, so a higher percentage of this incoming energy should be absorbed by the planet. The planet is expected to absorb about the same amount of energy from its star that Earth absorbs from the Sun, which would allow surface temperatures similar to Earth and perhaps liquid water.
- Kepler-22b
- Kepler-62e, one of two planets in Kepler-62 that are the right distance from the star to have liquid water and potentially sustain life.
- Kepler-62f,is only 40 percent larger than Earth, making it the exoplanet closest to the size of Earth known in the habitable zone of another star. Kepler-62e orbits on the inner edge of the habitable zone and is roughly 60 percent larger than Earth.
- LHS 1140 b, about 4% of the planet's mass is composed of water, suggesting it could be an ocean world estimated to have an average ocean depth of around 800 km. A later study measuring the planet's mass and radius with greater precision found a lower mass of about 5.6 times Earth's, and a correspondingly lower density, no longer consistent with a rocky planet given the planet's size. LHS 1140 b is likely an ocean world with an even greater water mass fraction of 9-19%, or a dense mini-Neptune. JWST observations rule out a hydrogen-rich atmosphere, supporting the ocean world scenario.
- TRAPPIST-1e
- TRAPPIST-1f
- TRAPPIST-1g

== See also ==
- Astrobiology
- Carbon planet
- Comparative planetary science
- Earth analog
- Earth Similarity Index
- Extraterrestrial atmosphere
- Extraterrestrial life
- Extraterrestrial liquid water
- Galactic habitable zone
- Goldilocks principle
- Habitable zone for complex life
- Habitability of binary star systems
- Habitability of K-type main-sequence star systems
- Habitability of red dwarf systems
- Habitability of G-type main-sequence star systems
- List of nearest terrestrial exoplanet candidates
- List of potentially habitable moons
- Lists of planets
- Ocean world
- Rare Earth hypothesis
- Solar analog
- Space colonization
- Super-Earth
- Superhabitable world
- Terrestrial planet
