= TOI-2257 b =

Exoplanet partially in the habitable zone

Discovery
- Discovered by: Schanche et al.
- Discovery date: November 2021
- Detection method: Transit

Orbital characteristics
- Semi-major axis: 0.145±0.003 AU
- Eccentricity: 0.496+0.216 −0.133
- Orbital period (sidereal): 35.189346(90) d
- Inclination: 89.786°+0.078° −0.062°
- Star: TOI-2257

Physical characteristics
- Mean radius: 2.194+0.113 −0.111 R_{🜨}
- Mass: 5.712+4.288 −2.311 M_{🜨} (predicted)
- Temperature: 256+61 −17 K (−17 °C; 1 °F, equilibrium)

TOI-2257 b is an extremely eccentric (0.496) exoplanet in or near the circumstellar habitable zone of the star TOI-2257, 188 light-years away. It is likely a sub-Neptune exoplanet, with a mass of 5.71 M🜨 and a radius of 2.19 R🜨. As a small planet in the habitable zone, it is included in the Planetary Habitability Laboratory's list of potentially habitable exoplanets.

== Discovery ==
The planet was discovered using the transit method, by TESS in November 2021. It has one of the longest orbital periods of any TESS planet. Further observations intend to find possible water vapor in the atmosphere of the planet, as well as any other planets in the system if they exist. The planet is most likely not a false positive, and its existence is supported by photometry and the high-resolution observations of ground-based telescopes.

== Properties ==
=== Mass, radius, and temperature ===
The planet has a radius 2.19 times that of Earth. Its mass and density are unknown, although it is predicted to have a mass roughly 3.4-10 times that of Earth based on mass-radius relationships. Based on its size, it is likely a Neptune-like world. Its average equilibrium temperature is 256 K (−17 °C; 1 °F), similar to the average temperature of Alert, Canada on Earth, and varies from approximately 193 K (−80 °C; −112 °F) during aphelion to 373 K (100 °C; 212 °F) at perihelion. However, the actual temperature could differ and would also vary throughout the planet's eccentric orbit.

=== Orbit ===
The planet has an orbital period of 35.19 days, with an extremely high eccentricity of almost 0.5. It has a semimajor axis of 0.145 AU, approximately half of Mercury's at the point in its orbit nearest to the Sun. According to NASA Exoplanet Exploration, the planet's eccentric orbit takes it through the "too hot" zone (albeit for a very short amount of time), then out to the outer fringes of the habitable zone, near the border with the "too cold" zone.

The planet has the highest eccentricity ever recorded around an M-type star, and the third highest of any known mini-Neptune as of 2021.

=== Star ===
The planet's star is M3V, with a temperature of 3,430 K. It has a metallicity of -0.27 and is about 8 billion years old, with ~0.3 times the mass and 0.33 times the radius of the Sun. For comparison, the Sun has a temperature of 5,778 K and is 4.572 billion years old, with a spectral class of G2V. The metallicity is 0.00.

== Habitability ==
The planet gets 37/50ths of the light that Earth gets from the Sun, putting it well within the habitable zone. However, the planet is likely a mini-Neptune given its size. The planet has an ESI of 0.72, similar to that of Mars and Kepler-22b. The equilibrium temperature could range from a comfortable 317 K (44 °C; 111 °F) to a chilly 239 K (−34 °C; −29 °F), both within the thermal amplitude of the Earth. With a greenhouse effect similar in intensity to Earth's, the temperature would be around 289 K (16 °C; 61 °F), and with a greenhouse effect twice as strong as Earth's, 322 K (49 °C; 120 °F). The temperature would vary throughout the planet's eccentric orbit. Due to the planet's habitable-zone location, water vapor is possible in the atmosphere. More detailed characterizations of the planet's atmosphere, including determining whether water vapor is present are expected from the JWST.

=== Tidal locking ===
Due to the planet's distance from its star, it would likely be tidally locked, with one side always facing the star, if it had a near-circular orbit. Due to its eccentric orbit, it is likely in a spin-orbit resonance instead.

=== Eccentricity ===
The planet has an extremely high eccentricity, which could, perhaps, play a part in its habitability. The planet, due to its high eccentricity, could go through frigid winters and sweltering summers. This could compromise its habitability by setting off a runaway greenhouse effect if a long period of time is spent above 320 K (47 °C) or 117 °F, or a runaway glaciation effect if a long period of time is spent far below 273 K (0 °C) or 32 °F. This would cause most or all of the planet to become uninhabitable, regardless of atmospheric conditions that combat tidal locking. On the other hand, the planet's eccentricity could be a factor working against tidal locking in and of itself; the planet would settle into a 3:2 resonance, where the year is 1.5 times as long as the day. Models show that such a planet, if oceanic, would have open water in the lower and middle latitudes and water ice above 60 °N/below 60 °S, much like on our Earth. This model is known as the "striped-ball planet".

In this model, there are four temperature tiers, with the warmest ocean temperatures occurring between 21 °N and °S, the next warmest between 21 and 46° on both sides of the equator, the second coldest between 46 and 62°, and the coldest, cold enough to form sea ice, between 61° and the poles. The freezing temperature of ocean water is assumed to be −1.8 °C (28.8 °F).

== See also ==
- Kepler-705b, another habitable-zone sub-Neptune
- K2-18b, which is confirmed to have a wet atmosphere
- K2-3d, an extremely low-density planet for its mass
- Mega-Earth
