= K2-332 b =

Potentially habitable exoplanet

Discovery
- Discovery date: 2016

Orbital characteristics
- Eccentricity: <0.05
- Orbital period (sidereal): 17.7 days

Physical characteristics
- Mean radius: 2.2 R_{🜨}
- Mass: 5.47 M_{🜨}
- Mean density: 2.83 g/cm3
- Temperature: 266 K

K2-332 b (also EPIC 211579112.01) is a potentially habitable Super-Earth or Mini-Neptune exoplanet with a radius of 2.2 Earths. It is in the empirical habitable zone, receiving 1.17 times the light that Earth gets from the sun. Its star, K2-332, is type M4V, with a temperature of ~3300 K. It was detected using the transit method in 2016 and is 402 light-years away.

== Discovery ==
The planet is confirmed to exist and was discovered by the K2 "Second Light" mission in 2016. It was originally referred to by its EPIC designation. The average transit time is 2 hours and 2 minutes and the average depth is 0.6508%. The object's star is within the 2MASS catalog.

== Characteristics ==
=== Mass, radius, and temperature ===
The planet has an estimated mass of 5.47 earths, and at a radius of more than twice that of the Earth, the density corresponds to that of a watery or gaseous Mini-Neptune rather than a rocky Super-Earth. It has an equilibrium temperature of 266 K (−7 °C; 19 °F), somewhat higher than Earth's.

=== Orbit and host star ===
The planet orbits within the inner part of the habitable zone, about 1/3 of the way between the runaway G limit for Super-Earths and the absolute inner edge. Its orbital period is 17.7 days, but the planet has an unknown semi-major axis. Its star is a dim red dwarf with about 20% the mass and size of the sun. In its habitable-zone orbit, the planet receives 1.17 times the insolation Earth gets from the sun.

== Habitability ==
=== General habitability and atmosphere ===
The planet is large (over 2 Earth-radii) and has a low density consistent with that of a watery or Neptune-like planet and not a silicate planet or a partially metallic planet like Earth. This compromises its habitability, for a solid surface is required for life to develop spontaneously on a planet.

However, 2021 studies show that sub-Neptunes have an abundance of water and life-friendly molecules (nitrogen, oxygen, CO_{2}, etc.) in their atmospheres, and the area with habitable temperatures and pressures is fairly stable. As a result, K2-332 b could be a habitable planet despite its extremely low density. If the system has a leftover dust disk or asteroid/comet belt, panspermia of microbial life from a terrestrial planet or earthlike moon could occur, and the organisms would have enough time to reproduce before dying due to the harsh conditions. 2019 studies of the TOI-270 system support the notion that Mini-Neptunes have life-friendly atmospheres rich in organic matter.

=== Tidal locking ===
The planet is very close to its star with a low eccentricity, so it is likely to be tidally locked, with one side always facing the star. In this case, the dayside would be extremely hot, while the nightside would be cold enough to freeze an atmosphere on a terrestrial planet, where the terminator line and adjacent twilight region would be the only habitable parts of the planet. This occurs in 4.5 Gyrs in planets orbiting stars M1 and later, and in 1 Gyr in planets around stars M7 and later. However, oceanic currents and wind can distribute heat evenly around a planet (any planet, not just an Earth-size one), warming the nightside past the freezing point of the atmosphere and cooling the dayside to below 100 °C. The area in the life-friendly pressure tier of the atmosphere that would also have habitable temperatures would then extend to 55° in both hemispheres on the dayside and around the nightside near the equator, with a maximum temperature of ~42 °F (6 °C). For higher levels of carbon dioxide, this area could even extend around the entire planet (minus the nadir and high polar regions).

== See also ==
- TOI-2257 b
- K2-18 b
- K2-3 d
