= List of exoplanets discovered by the Kepler space telescope: 1501–2000 =

This is a partial list of exoplanets discovered by the Kepler space telescope, running from star number 1501 through 2000, inclusive.

Table keys
Planet type
Circumbinary planet
Planet orbits a single star in a multiple star system
Planet has a circumbinary orbit in a system with more than 2 stars
Planet discovered by Kepler community
Potentially habitable
None of the above

== Table ==
Planet	Discovery method	Mass (M_{J})	Radius (R_{J})	Density (g/cm^{3})	Orbital period (days)	Semimajor axis (AU)	Orbital eccentricity	Year of confirmation	Ref.
Earth (for reference)		0.00315	0.0892	5.515	365.2563	1	0.0167	—	
Kepler-1501b	Transit	0.009 59	0.139+0.061 −0.022	—	14.5564533 ±0.0001121	—	—	2016	
Kepler-1502b	Transit	0.032 08	0.284+0.1 −0.057	—	41.7083629 ±0.0003485	—	—	2016	
Kepler-1503b	Transit	0.018 15	0.203+0.017 −0.021	—	96.16987 ±0.00118	—	—	2016	
Kepler-1504b	Transit	0.016 29	0.19+0.021 −0.017	—	82.304003 ±0.001593	—	—	2016	
Kepler-1505b	Transit	0.002 36	0.083±0.004	—	30.8609366 ±0.0002252	—	—	2016	
Kepler-1506b	Transit	0.007 23	0.118+0.017 −0.012	—	14.0329154 ±0.0002811	—	—	2016	
Kepler-1507b	Transit	0.001 64	0.075±0.008	—	16.0506213 ±0.0001447	—	—	2016	
Kepler-1508b	Transit	0.007 33	0.119+0.047 −0.023	—	20.7056504 ±0.0005499	—	—	2016	
Kepler-1509b	Transit	0.012 83	0.165+0.033 −0.014	—	25.4338197 ±0.0003114	—	—	2016	
Kepler-1510b	Transit	0.035 23	0.3+0.11 −0.05	—	84.703921 ±0.001896	—	—	2016	
Kepler-1511b	Transit	0.010 883	0.15+0.062 −0.021	—	23.2382792 ±0.000222	—	—	2016	
Kepler-1512b	Transit	0.005 54	0.105+0.006 −0.01	—	20.35972599 ±0.00005874	—	—	2016	
Kepler-1513b	Transit	0.152	0.755+0.123 −0.065	—	160.8846509 ±0.00007718	—	—	2016	
Kepler-1514b	Transit	5.28	1.055+0.054 −0.045	—	217.8317626 ±0.0001058	—	—	2016	
Kepler-1514c	Transit	0.005 47	0.1049+0.0051 −0.0039	—	10.514181±0.000039	—	0.032+0.35 −0.19	2020	
Kepler-1515b	Transit	0.208	0.852+0.069 −0.057	—	214.3114164 ±0.0001275	—	—	2016	
Kepler-1516b	Transit	0.011 67	0.156+0.044 −0.017	—	7.25931979 ±0.00003612	—	—	2016	
Kepler-1517b	Transit	0.216	0.871+0.249 −0.172	—	5.54608367 ±0.00000709	—	—	2016	
Kepler-1518b	Transit	0.029 98	0.272+0.082 −0.056	—	5.11177904 ±0.00005083	—	—	2016	
Kepler-1518c	Transit	0.027 52	0.259+0.073 −0.061	—	9.6310258±0.0001257	.0905	0	2023	
Kepler-1519b	Transit	0.124 57	0.63+0.072 −0.048	—	240.7989397 ±0.0006117	—	—	2016	
Kepler-1520b	Transit	0.088 39	0.515+0.02 −0.027	—	0.65355357 ±0.00000016	—	—	2016	
Kepler-1521b	Transit	0.021 39	0.223+0.008 −0.009	—	47.14840805 ±0.00007919	—	—	2016	
Kepler-1522b	Transit	0.011 45	0.154+0.021 −0.012	—	1.84788917 ±0.00000272	—	—	2016	
Kepler-1523b	Transit	0.009 81	0.141+0.024 −0.013	—	0.93875077 ±0.00000116	—	—	2016	
Kepler-1524b	Transit	0.038 69	0.316+0.131 −0.048	—	70.9674603 ±0.0001723	—	—	2016	
Kepler-1525b	Transit	0.002 18	0.081+0.005 −0.004	—	2.41660118 ±0.00000528	—	—	2016	
Kepler-1526b	Transit	0.020 38	0.217+0.008 −0.035	—	3.908632 ±0.0000074	—	—	2016	
Kepler-1527b	Transit	0.064 17	0.426+0.174 −0.067	—	160.129918 ±0.001742	—	—	2016	
Kepler-1528b	Transit	0.008 59	0.13+0.022 −0.012	—	1.79111021 ±0.0000077	—	—	2016	
Kepler-1529b	Transit	0.015 92	0.187+0.013 −0.01	—	5.33905686 ±0.00001277	—	—	2016	
Kepler-1530b	Transit	0.010 47	0.146+0.019 −0.01	—	2.5904434 ±0.0001715	—	—	2016	
Kepler-1530c	Transit	0.010 57	0.147+0.021 −0.01	—	5.3227406 ±0.0006331	—	—	2016	
Kepler-1530d	Transit	0.033 97	0.2925066285	—	9.20761013	—	—	2021	
Kepler-1531b	Transit	0.004 44	0.099+0.043 −0.016	—	1.13854338 ±0.00000259	—	—	2016	
Kepler-1532b	Transit	0.007 52	0.12+0.016 −0.011	—	1.09366356 ±0.00000216	—	—	2016	
Kepler-1533b	Transit	0.037 12	0.309+0.133 −0.061	—	308.5471 ±0.002415	—	—	2016	
Kepler-1534b	Transit	0.013 31	0.169+0.02 −0.013	—	5.71668872 ±0.00002925	—	—	2016	
Kepler-1535b	Transit	0.022 14	0.227+0.022 −0.017	—	138.9442 ±0.001214	—	—	2016	
Kepler-1536b	Transit	0.031 5	0.28+0.032 −0.047	—	364.758031 ±0.00582	—	—	2016	
Kepler-1537b	Transit	0.005 54	0.105+0.005 −0.008	—	1.4444538 ±0.00000233	—	—	2016	
Kepler-1538b	Transit	0.026 27	0.252+0.062 −0.028	—	175.138819 ±0.002807	—	—	2016	
Kepler-1539b	Transit	0.024 38	0.241+0.017 −0.013	—	133.3036741 ±0.0008843	—	—	2016	
Kepler-1540b	Transit	0.021 26	0.222+0.017 −0.012	—	125.4131177 ±0.0004189	—	—	2016	
Kepler-1541b	Transit	—	0.103+0.009 −0.007	—	8.40691199 ±0.00002698	—	—	2016	
Kepler-1542b	Transit	—	0.068+0.01 −0.007	—	3.95116882 ±0.00001633	—	—	2016	
Kepler-1542c	Transit	—	0.058+0.008 −0.005	—	2.89223021 ±0.00001472	—	—	2016	
Kepler-1542d	Transit	—	0.078+0.011 −0.008	—	5.99273738 ±0.0000226	—	—	2016	
Kepler-1542e	Transit	—	0.068+0.009 −0.007	—	5.10115756 ±0.00002409	—	—	2016	
Kepler-1543b	Transit	—	0.242+0.108 −0.045	—	6.96710269 ±0.00003285	—	—	2016	
Kepler-1544 b	Transit	—	0.159+0.008 −0.006	—	168.811174 ±0.001271	—	—	2016	
Kepler-1545b	Transit	—	0.241+0.02 −0.016	—	163.692349 ±0.001383	—	—	2016	
Kepler-1546b	Transit	—	0.279+0.052 −0.03	—	19.5974971 ±0.0001407	—	—	2016	
Kepler-1547b	Transit	—	0.08+0.025 −0.011	—	0.69297968 ±0.00000149	—	—	2016	
Kepler-1548b	Transit	—	0.236+0.048 −0.019	—	124.828679 ±0.001524	—	—	2016	
Kepler-1549b	Transit	—	0.229+0.02 −0.018	—	214.886545 ±0.003111	—	—	2016	
Kepler-1550b	Transit	—	0.269+0.063 −0.034	—	225.582809 ±0.003846	—	—	2016	
Kepler-1551b	Transit	—	0.237+0.081 −0.037	—	24.4973698 ±0.0002094	—	—	2016	
Kepler-1552b	Transit	—	0.22+0.01 −0.009	—	184.771853 ±0.001546	—	—	2016	
Kepler-1553b	Transit	—	0.103+0.009 −0.008	—	4.24261881 ±0.00002781	—	—	2016	
Kepler-1554b	Transit	—	0.259+0.021 −0.024	—	198.088774 ±0.002456	—	—	2016	
Kepler-1555b	Transit	—	0.144+0.041 −0.015	—	8.10501635 ±0.00008122	—	—	2016	
Kepler-1556b	Transit	—	0.175+0.036 −0.013	—	8.82713457 ±0.00004025	—	—	2016	
Kepler-1557b	Transit	—	0.136+0.045 −0.019	—	3.74032496 ±0.00002165	—	—	2016	
Kepler-1558b	Transit	—	0.061+0.005 −0.004	—	3.50470358 ±0.00001612	—	—	2016	
Kepler-1559b	Transit	—	0.064+0.006 −0.004	—	0.97191543 ±0.00000379	—	—	2016	
Kepler-1560b	Transit	—	0.079+0.016 −0.008	—	3.03195744 ±0.00001306	—	—	2016	
Kepler-1561b	Transit	—	0.097+0.023 −0.016	—	1.00520701 ±0.0000051	—	—	2016	
Kepler-1562b	Transit	—	0.317+0.089 −0.037	—	64.2737752 ±0.0007141	—	—	2016	
Kepler-1563b	Transit	—	0.067+0.011 −0.007	—	3.43276598 ±0.00002976	—	—	2016	
Kepler-1564b	Transit	—	0.131+0.017 −0.012	—	18.0540381 ±0.0001919	—	—	2016	
Kepler-1565b	Transit	—	0.106+0.007 −0.011	—	1.53818844 ±0.00000686	—	—	2016	
Kepler-1566b	Transit	—	0.07+0.007 −0.004	—	0.53991524 ±0.00000135	—	—	2016	
Kepler-1567b	Transit	—	0.244+0.036 −0.021	—	153.979578 ±0.001785	—	—	2016	
Kepler-1568b	Transit	—	0.116+0.019 −0.013	—	20.925392 ±0.0002521	—	—	2016	
Kepler-1569b	Transit	—	0.15+0.065 −0.028	—	5.79180156 ±0.00003622	—	—	2016	
Kepler-1570b	Transit	—	0.095+0.017 −0.009	—	26.548955 ±0.0003047	—	—	2016	
Kepler-1571b	Transit	—	0.136+0.061 −0.03	—	3.38555488 ±0.00001595	—	—	2016	
Kepler-1572b	Transit	—	0.084+0.017 −0.007	—	5.49548621 ±0.0000292	—	—	2016	
Kepler-1573b	Transit	—	0.107+0.021 −0.01	—	2.6157554 ±0.00001498	—	—	2016	
Kepler-1574b	Transit	—	0.115+0.025 −0.013	—	6.9424334 ±0.00006006	—	—	2016	
Kepler-1575b	Transit	—	0.117+0.018 −0.012	—	2.55314213 ±0.00001304	—	—	2016	
Kepler-1576b	Transit	—	0.093+0.026 −0.012	—	6.98471973 ±0.0000594	—	—	2016	
Kepler-1577b	Transit	—	0.101+0.004 −0.01	—	6.30560247 ±0.00003666	—	—	2016	
Kepler-1578b	Transit	—	0.093±0.01	—	1.45088691 ±0.00000695	—	—	2016	
Kepler-1579b	Transit	—	0.075+0.005 −0.004	—	0.84990789 ±0.00000293	—	—	2016	
Kepler-1580b	Transit	—	0.188+0.027 −0.028	—	56.6449279 ±0.0008525	—	—	2016	
Kepler-1581b	Transit	—	0.071+0.012 −0.008	—	6.28385491 ±0.00004246	—	—	2016	
Kepler-1582b	Transit	—	0.133+0.015 −0.012	—	4.83817712 ±0.0000884	—	—	2016	
Kepler-1583b	Transit	—	0.054+0.008 −0.004	—	9.32807355 ±0.00008851	—	—	2016	
Kepler-1584b	Transit	—	0.144+0.036 −0.019	—	13.3997099 ±0.000157	—	—	2016	
Kepler-1585b	Transit	—	0.16+0.022 −0.014	—	3.5827463 ±0.00001739	—	—	2016	
Kepler-1586b	Transit	—	0.136+0.058 −0.03	—	15.6049212 ±0.0001365	—	—	2016	
Kepler-1587b	Transit	—	0.119+0.042 −0.021	—	9.4060467 ±0.0001376	—	—	2016	
Kepler-1588b	Transit	—	0.068+0.01 −0.006	—	7.84931739 ±0.00009456	—	—	2016	
Kepler-1589b	Transit	—	0.097+0.039 −0.015	—	0.99166527 ±0.00000784	—	—	2016	
Kepler-1590b	Transit	—	0.102+0.03 −0.013	—	7.61760804 ±0.00004334	—	—	2016	
Kepler-1591b	Transit	—	0.113+0.037 −0.017	—	8.18504949 ±0.00007831	—	—	2016	
Kepler-1592b	Transit	—	0.137+0.062 −0.025	—	3.05710069 ±0.00002334	—	—	2016	
Kepler-1593b	Transit	—	0.283+0.027 −0.025	—	174.509835 ±0.001852	—	—	2016	
Kepler-1594b	Transit	—	0.095+0.023 −0.011	—	2.71603809 ±0.00001355	—	—	2016	
Kepler-1595b	Transit	—	0.11+0.008 −0.009	—	4.56380468 ±0.0000324	—	—	2016	
Kepler-1596b	Transit	—	0.17+0.022 −0.015	—	66.373379 ±0.001476	—	—	2016	
Kepler-1597b	Transit	—	0.095+0.042 −0.015	—	2.94654179 ±0.00003471	—	—	2016	
Kepler-1598b	Transit	—	0.085+0.025 −0.009	—	4.34195123 ±0.00002827	—	—	2016	
Kepler-1599b	Transit	—	0.145+0.029 −0.021	—	122.363553 ±0.008968	—	—	2016	
Kepler-1600b	Transit	—	0.279+0.025 −0.015	—	386.370548 ±0.008591	—	—	2016	
Kepler-1600c	Transit	—	0.1732597431	—	7.298049927	—	—	2021	
Kepler-1601b	Transit	—	0.073+0.021 −0.01	—	2.20921951 ±0.0000151	—	—	2016	
Kepler-1602b	Transit	—	0.12+0.052 −0.021	—	11.17931605 ±0.00007504	—	—	2016	
Kepler-1603b	Transit	—	0.115+0.042 −0.017	—	2.27163926 ±0.00002336	—	—	2016	
Kepler-1604b	Transit	—	0.126+0.017 −0.01	—	0.68368426 ±0.00000063	—	—	2016	
Kepler-1605b	Transit	—	0.096+0.008 −0.007	—	85.7565495 ±0.0006161	—	—	2016	
Kepler-1606b	Transit	—	0.185+0.021 −0.013	—	196.435224 ±0.003935	—	—	2016	
Kepler-1607b	Transit	—	0.082+0.029 −0.012	—	13.6473676 ±0.0002102	—	—	2016	
Kepler-1608b	Transit	—	0.154+0.014 −0.017	—	16.4735686 ±0.0001698	—	—	2016	
Kepler-1609b	Transit	—	0.198+0.08 −0.029	—	114.34219 ±0.004097	—	—	2016	
Kepler-1610b	Transit	—	0.144+0.017 −0.012	—	8.70181574 ±0.00008315	—	—	2016	
Kepler-1610c	Transit	—	0.186+0.031 −0.019	—	44.9851885±0.0004873	0.2323	0	2023	
Kepler-1611b	Transit	—	0.072+0.014 −0.006	—	5.1762429 ±0.00005826	—	—	2016	
Kepler-1612b	Transit	—	0.092+0.016 −0.01	—	3.91795101 ±0.00002727	—	—	2016	
Kepler-1613b	Transit	—	0.186+0.039 −0.045	—	1.5184299 ±0.0001991	—	—	2016	
Kepler-1614b	Transit	—	0.133+0.011 −0.013	—	3.9466141 ±0.00003022	—	—	2016	
Kepler-1615b	Transit	—	0.184+0.043 −0.052	—	47.3126192 ±0.0008593	—	—	2016	
Kepler-1616b	Transit	—	0.091+0.042 −0.013	—	6.76284377 ±0.00006948	—	—	2016	
Kepler-1617b	Transit	—	0.107+0.033 −0.014	—	27.4785572 ±0.0005078	—	—	2016	
Kepler-1618b	Transit	—	0.112+0.046 −0.021	—	6.10826019 ±0.00008991	—	—	2016	
Kepler-1619b	Transit	—	0.068+0.013 −0.007	—	23.6225913 ±0.000542	—	—	2016	
Kepler-1620b	Transit	—	0.144+0.057 −0.024	—	101.951829 ±0.001572	—	—	2016	
Kepler-1621b	Transit	—	0.193+0.071 −0.033	—	92.263714 ±0.002385	—	—	2016	
Kepler-1622b	Transit	—	0.131+0.061 −0.024	—	10.8118737 ±0.0001009	—	—	2016	
Kepler-1623b	Transit	—	0.117+0.028 −0.016	—	4.36128348 ±0.00002698	—	—	2016	
Kepler-1624b	Transit	—	0.509+0.035 −0.041	—	3.29030452 ±0.00000456	—	—	2016	
Kepler-1625b	Transit	—	0.541+0.078 −0.047	—	287.378949 ±0.002983	—	—	2016	
Kepler-1626b	Transit	—	0.18+0.059 −0.038	—	4.13962966 ±0.00002851	—	—	2016	
Kepler-1627b	Transit	—	0.329+0.044 −0.037	—	7.20283653 ±0.00008773	—	—	2016	
Kepler-1628b	Transit	—	0.574+0.084 −0.045	—	76.378033 ±0.001833	—	—	2016	
Kepler-1629b	Transit	—	0.069+0.013 −0.007	—	3.87595807 ±0.00002379	—	—	2016	
Kepler-1630b	Transit	—	0.195+0.018 −0.009	—	509.997402 ±0.003256	—	—	2016	
Kepler-1631b	Transit	—	0.12+0.018 −0.013	—	4.09513932 ±0.00003048	—	—	2016	
Kepler-1632b	Transit	—	0.22+0.075 −0.031	—	448.303558 ±0.004164	—	—	2016	
Kepler-1633b	Transit	—	0.141+0.058 −0.022	—	186.404271 ±0.005886	—	—	2016	
Kepler-1634b	Transit	—	0.285+0.046 −0.054	—	374.876239 ±0.007107	—	—	2016	
Kepler-1635b	Transit	—	0.325+0.029 −0.06	—	469.63111 ±0.01246	—	—	2016	
Kepler-1636b	Transit	—	0.288+0.068 −0.031	—	425.47785 ±0.01122	—	—	2016	
Kepler-1637b	Transit	—	0.079+0.016 −0.008	—	6.10960324 ±0.00006485	—	—	2016	
Kepler-1638b	Transit	—	0.167+0.029 −0.02	—	259.33683 ±0.01303	—	—	2016	
Kepler-1639b	Transit	—	0.23+0.07 −0.03	—	9.878482 ±0.002171	—	—	2016	
Kepler-1640b	Transit	—	0.43+0.221 −0.071	—	7.5844126 ±0.0003866	—	—	2016	
Kepler-1641b	Transit	—	0.277+0.101 −0.052	—	19.672266 ±0.00111	—	—	2016	
Kepler-1641c	Transit	—	0.263+0.087 −0.044	—	32.657212 ±0.003099	—	—	2016	
Kepler-1642b	Transit	—	0.285+0.03 −0.022	—	12.2057513 ±0.0005101	—	—	2016	
Kepler-1642c	Transit	—	0.237+0.026 −0.019	—	6.6513802 ±0.0003227	—	—	2016	
Kepler-1643b	Transit	—	0.205+0.022 −0.013	—	5.34264507 ±0.00002177	—	—	2016	
Kepler-1644b	Transit	—	0.168+0.046 −0.014	—	21.0907758 ±0.0001114	—	—	2016	
Kepler-1645b	Transit	—	0.159+0.038 −0.018	—	16.1779561 ±0.0001069	—	—	2016	
Kepler-1646b	Transit	—	0.11+0.025 −0.021	—	4.48558383 ±0.0000105	—	—	2016	
Kepler-1647b	Transit	1.51968±0.64815	1.059±0.012	—	1107.5923 ±0.0227	2.7205±0.007	0.0581±0.0689	2016	
Kepler-1648b	Timing	11.8+0.8 −0.6	—	—	840+22 −20	—	0.15+0.13 −0.10	2016	
Kepler-1649b	Transit	—	0.096±0.013	—	8.689099 ±0.000025	0.0514±0.0028	0	2017	
Kepler-1649c	Transit	—	0.003	—	19.53527 ±0.00010	—	—	2020	
Kepler-1650b	Transit	—	0.086+0.01 −0.009	—	1.53818001 ±0.00000155	—	0.01+0.15 −0.01	2017	
Kepler-1651b	Transit	—	0.164±0.01	—	9.87863917 ±0.00001067	—	0.13+0.06 −0.03	2017	
Kepler-1652b	Transit	—	0.143±0.016	9.900+0.880 −1.340	38.09722±0.00021	0.1654+0.0042 −0.0075	—	2017	
Kepler-1653b	Transit	—	0.2211+0.0225 −0.0216	3.08+0.19 −0.27	140.2524±0.0030	0.4706+0.0098 −0.0041	—	2017	
Kepler-1654b	Transit	<0.5	0.819+0.019 −0.017	<1.2	1047.8356+0.0018 −0.0019	2.026+0.037 −0.035	0.26+0.21 −0.11	2018	
Kepler-1655b	Transit	0.016+0.010 −0.009	0.1974±0.0073	2.5+1.6 −1.4	11.8728787±0.0000085	0.103±0.001	—	2018	
Kepler-1656b	Transit	0.153+0.013 −0.012	0.448±0.047	2.13+0.87 −0.574	31.578659	0.197±0.021	0.836+0.013 −0.012	2018	
Kepler-1657b	Transit	1.93+0.19 −0.21	0.990+0.060 −0.070	2.46+0.42 −0.36	141.241671±0.000086	0.534+0.012 −0.030	0.496±0.031	2018	
Kepler-1658b (Note: This was the first potential planet discovered by the Kepler space telescope, but it took over a decade to confirm.)	Transit	5.7	—	—	3.85	—	—	2019	
Kepler-1659b	Transit	0.028±0.001	0.17±0.02	—	13.6088±0.0006	0.112293	0.0114	2019	
Kepler-1659c	Transit	—	0.294759	—	17.6046	—	—	2020	
Kepler-1660 AB b	Transit timing var.	4.89±0.23	—	—	239.48±0.07	0.9817	0.055±0.0015	2017	
Kepler-1661b	Transit	0.053±0.038	0.345±0.005	1.6±1.1	175.06±006	0.633±0.005	0.057±0.005	2020	
Kepler-1662b	Transit	0.2234	0.7904	—	134.4786723	0.5187	—	2020	
Kepler-1663b	Transit	—	0.2947594	—	17.6046	—	—	2021	
Kepler-1664b	Transit	—	0.2706045	—	14.3868	—	—	2021	
Kepler-1665b	Transit	—	0.2532882	—	11.9548	—	—	2021	
Kepler-1666b	Transit	—	0.2571806	—	25.8476	—	—	2021	
Kepler-1666c	Transit	—	0.2886651	—	40.7157	—	—	2021	
Kepler-1667b	Transit	—	0.2662014	—	83.5781	—	—	2021	
Kepler-1668b	Transit	—	0.3878708	—	15.434	—	—	2021	
Kepler-1669b	Transit	—	0.2480540	—	9.51216	—	—	2021	
Kepler-1669c	Transit	—	0.1696148	—	1.609320045	—	—	2023	
Kepler-1669d	Transit	—	0.109+0.004 −0.005	—	4.7294±0.0003075	0.0468	—	2023	
Kepler-1670b	Transit	—	0.2994450	—	20.4998	—	—	2021	
Kepler-1671b	Transit	—	0.1182597	—	4.16787	—	—	2021	
Kepler-1672b	Transit	—	0.2649859	—	150.878	—	—	2021	
Kepler-1673b	Transit	—	0.2618894	—	33.7888	—	—	2021	
Kepler-1674b	Transit	—	0.2860000	—	62.5611	—	—	2021	
Kepler-1675b	Transit	—	0.2787789	—	63.0382	—	—	2021	
Kepler-1676b	Transit	—	0.3012721	—	29.9221	—	—	2021	
Kepler-1677b	Transit	—	0.2410707	—	22.064	—	—	2021	
Kepler-1678b	Transit	—	0.2947829	—	147.974	—	—	2021	
Kepler-1679b	Transit	—	0.1846019	—	9.75376	—	—	2021	
Kepler-1680b	Transit	—	0.1212906	—	8.77424	—	—	2021	
Kepler-1681b	Transit	—	0.2277828	—	69.8956	—	—	2021	
Kepler-1682b	Transit	—	0.2577757	—	14.8334	—	—	2021	
Kepler-1683b	Transit	—	0.1672564	—	15.0337	—	—	2021	
Kepler-1684b	Transit	—	0.2561198	—	47.7055	—	—	2021	
Kepler-1685b	Transit	—	0.2298813	—	20.4905	—	—	2021	
Kepler-1686b	Transit	—	0.1271772	—	9.30987	—	—	2021	
Kepler-1687b	Transit	—	0.1477597	—	5.77954	—	—	2021	
Kepler-1688b	Transit	—	0.1125654	—	5.62012	—	—	2021	
Kepler-1689b	Transit	—	0.0844666	—	8.483	—	—	2021	
Kepler-1690b	Transit	—	0.2507888	—	234.636	—	—	2021	
Kepler-1691b	Transit	—	0.1636818	—	3.8482	—	—	2021	
Kepler-1692b	Transit	—	0.0991856	—	5.95966	—	—	2021	
Kepler-1693b	Transit	—	0.1150311	—	12.0999	—	—	2021	
Kepler-1693c	Transit	—	0.0871607	—	5.363709927	—	—	2022	
Kepler-1694b	Transit	—	0.1052600	—	3.89526	—	—	2021	
Kepler-1695b	Transit	—	0.0998741	—	4.7329	—	—	2021	
Kepler-1696b	Transit	—	0.2506753	—	65.9409	—	—	2021	
Kepler-1697b	Transit	—	0.1123693	—	33.4969	—	—	2021	
Kepler-1698b	Transit	—	0.0957406	—	1.2107	—	—	2021	
Kepler-1699b	Transit	—	0.1397726	—	3.49082	—	—	2021	
Kepler-1700b	Transit	—	0.2588365	—	234.239	—	—	2021	
Kepler-1701b	Transit		0.198		169.134			2021	
Kepler-1702b	Transit	—	0.1429126	—	18.5012	—	—	2021	
Kepler-1703b (KOI-3503b)	Transit	<0.0289	0.106+0.021 −0.017	<10.00	21.185	—	—	2021	
Kepler-1703c (KOI-3503c)	Transit	<0.03260	0.108+0.025 −0.008	<10.00	31.828	—	—	2021	
Kepler-1704b	Transit	4.16+0.29 −0.28	1.066+0.044 −0.042	4.07+0.55 −0.49	988.88112±0.00091	2.027+0.024 −0.030	0.920+0.010 −0.016	2021	
Kepler-1705b	Transit	0.0141+0.0015 −0.0014	0.181+0.011 −0.012	3.0+0.7 −0.6	9.03502+0.00065 −0.00064	—	0.0330+0.0730 −0.0200	2021	
Kepler-1705c	Transit	0.0171+0.0019 −0.0018	0.183+0.012 −0.013	3.5+0.8 −0.7	2455207+0.020 −0.017	—	0.028+0.064 −0.018	2021	
Kepler-1706b (KIC 10068024b)	Orbital Brightness Modulation	—	2.0±0.4	—	2.073549+0.000008 −0.000177	—	—	2021	
Kepler-1707b (KIC 5479689b)	Orbital Brightness Modulation	—	0.5+0.4 −0.1	—	1.701531+0.000008 −0.000419	—	—	2021	
Kepler-1708b	Transit	<4.6	0.8886+0.0535 −0.0526		737.1131+0.00146 −0.00770	1.64±0.10	<0.40	2022	
Kepler-1709b	Transit	—	0.2787272844	—	65.70459747	—	—	2022	
Kepler-1710b	Transit	—	0.285257073	—	14.91110039	—	—	2022	
Kepler-1711b	Transit	—	0.1716	—	21.06080055	—	—	2022	
Kepler-1712b	Transit	—	0.203740699	—	13.81499958	—	—	2022	
Kepler-1713b	Transit	—	0.1531571335	—	18.01160049	—	—	2022	
Kepler-1714b	Transit	—	0.2912283557	—	10.27530003	—	—	2022	
Kepler-1715b	Transit	—	0.3693844058	—	35.59730148	—	—	2022	
Kepler-1716b	Transit	—	0.2163237289	—	35.58100128	—	—	2022	
Kepler-1717b	Transit	—	0.2666877263	—	30.65279961	—	—	2022	
Kepler-1718b	Transit	—	0.2291484629	—	135.1880035	—	—	2022	
Kepler-1719b	Transit	—	0.352396559	—	6.149559975	—	—	2022	
Kepler-1720b	Transit	—	0.2868996773	—	12.70639992	—	—	2022	
Kepler-1721b	Transit	—	0.2782204415	—	4.592380047	—	—	2022	
Kepler-1722b	Transit	—	0.2557942363	—	9.178569794	—	—	2022	
Kepler-1723b	Transit	—	0.2569783786	—	39.75289917	—	—	2022	
Kepler-1724b	Transit	—	0.253080316	—	6.45442009	—	—	2022	
Kepler-1725b	Transit	—	0.25091645	—	16.71990013	—	—	2022	
Kepler-1726b	Transit	—	0.2238044306	—	18.39629936	—	—	2022	
Kepler-1727b	Transit	—	0.2830958796	—	9.029299736	—	—	2022	
Kepler-1728b	Transit	—	0.2636295687	—	4.782999992	—	—	2022	
Kepler-1729b	Transit	—	0.3474037436	—	4.220970154	—	—	2022	
Kepler-1730b	Transit	—	0.4001474628	—	13.81019974	—	—	2021	
Kepler-1731b	Transit	—	0.2616613098	—	21.76129913	—	—	2021	
Kepler-1732b	Transit	—	0.3656918361	—	32.31240082	—	—	2021	
Kepler-1733b	Transit	—	0.3243670089	—	9.229579926	—	—	2021	
Kepler-1734b	Transit	—	0.2755389630	—	6.796850204	—	—	2021	
Kepler-1735b	Transit	—	0.1065477201	—	7.71792984	—	—	2021	
Kepler-1736b	Transit	—	0.3458463982	—	37.81029892	—	—	2021	
Kepler-1940b	Transit	—	0.1380433006	—	4.950610161	—	—	2022	
Kepler-1941b	Transit	—	0.2363970074	—	31.33510017	—	—	2022	
Kepler-1942b	Transit	—	0.1888689751	—	4.626049995	—	—	2022	
Kepler-1943b	Transit	—	0.1381652742	—	4.850180149	—	—	2022	
Kepler-1944b	Transit	—	0.2462054045	—	9.842579842	—	—	2022	
Kepler-1945b	Transit	—	0.1150	—	6.080039978	—	—	2022	
Kepler-1946b	Transit	—	0.221976203	—	3.035190105	—	—	2022	
Kepler-1947b	Transit	—	0.09012118310	—	6.963630199	—	—	2022	
Kepler-1948b	Transit	—	0.0921432811	—	15.57129955	—	—	2022	
Kepler-1949b	Transit	—	0.1980238407	—	2.208280087	—	—	2022	
Kepler-1950b	Transit	—	0.1362267925	—	10.77690029	—	—	2022	
Kepler-1951b	Transit	—	0.2070725196	—	20.65780067	—	—	2022	
Kepler-1952b	Transit	—	0.110557195	—	27.21080017	—	—	2022	
Kepler-1953b	Transit	—	0.114706832	—	6.245659828	—	—	2022	
Kepler-1954b	Transit	—	0.1607960068	—	5.883430004	—	—	2022	
Kepler-1955b	Transit	—	0.1040726905	—	14.26519966	—	—	2022	
Kepler-1956b	Transit	—	0.09719013764	—	5.943719864	—	—	2022	
Kepler-1957b	Transit	—	0.0841957622	—	2.186619997	—	—	2022	
Kepler-1958b	Transit	—	0.1829999680	—	9.328619957	—	—	2022	
Kepler-1959b	Transit	—	0.1019858361	—	6.38669014	—	—	2022	
Kepler-1960b	Transit	—	0.1166472734	—	2.297940016	—	—	2022	
Kepler-1961b	Transit	—	0.1444181983	—	5.604710102	—	—	2022	
Kepler-1962b	Transit	—	0.1083630455	—	7.991459846	—	—	2022	
Kepler-1963b	Transit	—	0.0664083781	—	1.962260008	—	—	2022	
Kepler-1964b	Transit	—	0.15889569	—	2.440829992	—	—	2022	
Kepler-1965b	Transit	—	0.1208095027	—	41.86869812	—	—	2022	
Kepler-1966b	Transit	—	0.09856322359	—	8.617429733	—	—	2022	
Kepler-1967b	Transit	—	0.0651464920	—	7.281690121	—	—	2022	
Kepler-1968b	Transit	—	0.1338248661	—	7.281099796	—	—	2022	
Kepler-1969b	Transit	—	0.1500234544	—	6.647520065	—	—	2022	
Kepler-1970b (KIC 8121913b)	Orbital Brightness Modulation	2.1±0.4	—	—	3.294601+0.000013 −0.000220	—	—	2021	
Kepler-1971b (KOI-4777.01)	Transit	<0.312	0.045±0.003	—	0.412000±0.000001	0.0080±0.0003	—	2022	
Kepler-1972b	Transit	0.0064±0.0019	0.072±0.004	—	7.54425±0.00054	—	—	2022	
Kepler-1972c	Transit	0.0066±0.002	0.078±0.005	—	11.3295±0.0011	—	—	2022	
Kepler-1973b (KOI-984b)	Transit	—	0.384±0.004	—	4.2881785±0.0000035	0.0504±0.0006	0.12±0.02	2022	
Kepler-1973c (KOI-984c)	Transit timing var.	0.6601±0.1259	—	—	21.5120±0.0004	0.1467±0.0015	0.38±0.02	2022	
Kepler-1974b (KOI-7368b)	Transit	—	0.198±0.011	—	6.8430344±0.0000125	—	—	2022	
Kepler-1975b (KOI-7913b)	Transit	—	0.209±0.016	—	24.278553±0.000263	—	—	2022	
Kepler-1976b	Transit timing var.	—	1.089+0.175 −0.130	—	4.959 ± 0.000000515	0.0565	—	2023	
Kepler-1977b	Transit	—	0.148+0.017 −0.010	—	4.537 ± 0.00002498	0.0486	—	2023	
Kepler-1978b	Transit	—	0.238+0.034 −0.019	—	10.849694 ± 0.00002777	0.0914	—	2023	
Kepler-1979b	Transit	—	2.617+0.787 −0.262	—	18.508 ± 0.0001311	0.1383	—	2023	
Kepler-1980b	Transit	—	0.197+0.032 −0.011	—	33.0257 ± 0.0006181	0.2049	—	2023	
Kepler-1981b	Transit	—	0.823+0.157 −0.366	—	453.542 ± 0.003501	1.3292	—	2023	
Kepler-1982b	Transit	—	0.069+0.012 −0.004	—	3.823 ± 0.00004481	0.0511	—	2023	
Kepler-1983b	Transit	—	0.208+0.012 −0.016	—	7.3285± 0.00002311	0.0689	—	2023	
Kepler-1984b	Transit	—	0.608+0.067 −0.083	—	1.9928 ± 0.0000007832	0.0283	—	2023	
Kepler-1985b	Transit	—	0.203+0.022 −0.020	—	3.4206 ± 0.00001928	0.0426	—	2023	
Kepler-1986b	Transit	—	0.169+0.031 −0.013	—	19.5489 ± 0.0001396	0.1307	—	2023	
Kepler-1987b	Transit	—	0.110+0.010 −0.008	—	2.34586 ± 0.00000955	0.0318	—	2023	
Kepler-1987c	Transit	—	0.119+0.011 −0.008	—	3.6483 ± 0.00001621	0.0427	—	2023	
Kepler-1987d	Transit	—	0.237+0.022 −0.016	—	5.6449 ± 0.000008778	0.0571	—	2023	
Kepler-1987e	Transit	—	0.171+0.016 −0.012	—	8.7429 ± 0.00003311	0.0765	—	2023	
Kepler-1988b	Transit	—	0.136+0.027 −0.044	—	11.4950 ± 0.00008821	0.1038	—	2023	
Kepler-1989b	Transit	—	0.412+0.122 −0.065	—	10.1610 ± 0.000009176	0.0918	—	2023	
Kepler-1990b	Transit	—	0.292+0.048 −0.029	—	1.7351 ± 0.000000282	0.0286	—	2023	
Kepler-1990c	Transit	—	0.087+0.015 −0.009	—	4.0684 ± 0.00001212	0.0504	—	2023	
Kepler-1991b	Transit	—	0.131+0.018 −0.019	—	13.2607 ± 0.00009795	0.1065	—	2023	
Kepler-1991c	Transit	—	0.229 ± 0.032	—	22.7902 ± 0.00006878	0.1528	—	2023	
Kepler-1992b	Transit	—	0.081+0.008 −0.004	—	15.61122 ± 0.0001275	0.1169	—	2023	
Kepler-1993b	Transit	—	0.370+0.114 −0.266	—	26.6565 ± 0.0002052	0.1943	—	2023	
Kepler-1994b	Transit	—	0.045+0.005 −0.004	—	4.61225 ± 0.00003445	0.053	—	2023	
Kepler-1995b	Transit	—	0.382+0.197 −0.059	—	73.7578 ± 0.0004304	0.3259	—	2023	
Kepler-1996b	Transit	—	0.202+0.014 −0.006	—	32.376 ± 0.0001311	0.1789	—	2023	
Kepler-1996c	Transit	—	0.251+0.018 −0.007	—	92.7297 ± 0.000398	0.3608	—	2023	
Kepler-1997b	Transit	—	0.203+0.064 −0.025	—	26.7575 ± 0.0002942	0.01815	—	2023	
Kepler-1998b	Transit	—	0.054+0.007 −0.004	—	3.03267 ± 0.00001374	0.0405	—	2023	
Kepler-1999b	Transit	—	0.294+0.023 −0.027	—	8.73967 ± 0.0003092	0.0713	—	2023	
Kepler-2000b	Transit	—	0.244+0.009 −0.015	—	6.3831 ± 0.000006398	0.0562	—	2023	
Kepler-2000c	Transit	—	0.140+0.005 −0.009	—	20.618 ± 0.0001382	0.1228	—	2023	
Planet	Discovery method	Mass (M_{J})	Radius (R_{J})	Density (g/cm^{3})	Orbital period (days)	Semimajor axis (AU)	Orbital eccentricity	Year of confirmation	Ref.

back to top
