= GJ 1002 b =

Potentially habitable exoplanet

Discovery
- Discovery date: December 2022
- Detection method: Radial velocity

Orbital characteristics
- Semi-major axis: 0.0457±0.0013 AU
- Orbital period (sidereal): 10.3465±0.027 d
- Semi-amplitude: 1.31±0.14 m/s
- Star: GJ 1002

Physical characteristics
- Mass: ≥1.08±0.13 M_{🜨}
- Temperature: T_{eq}: 230.9 ± 6.7 K (−42.25 ± 6.70 °C; −44.05 ± 12.06 °F)

GJ 1002 b (also designated as Gliese 1002 b) is a potentially habitable exoplanet located 16 light-years away, in the constellation of Cetus. The planet, which has an Earth Similarity Index of 86%, is in the habitable zone of its parent star. GJ 1002 b has a minimum mass of 1.08 Earth masses and is estimated by the Planetary Habitability Laboratory to have 1.03 times the radius of Earth and a surface temperature of 261 Kelvin.

== Detection ==
GJ 1002 b was detected in 2022 via the radial velocity method, which was used to measure the planet's minimum mass.

== Host star ==
The host star, GJ 1002, is a quiet M5.5V type red dwarf not believed to release flares that could harm the atmosphere. The planet orbits its host star at a distance of 0.0457 AU (Astronomical units), with a 10.3 day orbital period and a 0.0 eccentricity.

== See also ==
- Proxima Centauri b, a potentially habitable planet of similar physical characteristics that is also orbiting a small red dwarf star.
