= K2-3c =

Extrasolar planet

Discovery
- Discovery site: Kepler Space Observatory
- Discovery date: 2015
- Detection method: Transit

Orbital characteristics
- Semi-major axis: 0.1357+0.0023 −0.0022 AU
- Eccentricity: 0.048+0.073 −0.035
- Orbital period (sidereal): 24.646729+0.000044 −0.000042 d
- Inclination: 89.84°+0.11° −0.14°
- Argument of periastron: −180°+100° −110°
- Semi-amplitude: 0.88±0.28 m/s
- Star: K2-3

Physical characteristics
- Mean radius: 1.582+0.057 −0.051 R_{🜨}
- Mass: 2.68±0.85 M_{🜨}
- Mean density: 3.7±1.2 g/cm^{3}
- Temperature: 371.8+3.8 −3.9 K (98.7 °C; 209.6 °F, equilibrium)

K2-3c, also known as EPIC 201367065 c, is an exoplanet orbiting the red dwarf star K2-3 every 24 days. It is 143 light-years away. It has a density of about 3.7 g/cm^{3}, indicating that it could be an ocean world or a mini-Neptune. It is the second-smallest planet in the system by both radius and mass, with a mass almost three times that of Earth.
