= K2-3b =

Super Earth

Discovery
- Discovery site: Kepler Space Observatory
- Discovery date: 2015
- Detection method: Transit

Orbital characteristics
- Semi-major axis: 0.0747+0.0013 −0.0012 AU
- Eccentricity: 0.107+0.057 −0.059
- Orbital period (sidereal): 10.0546535+0.0000088 −0.0000091 d
- Inclination: 89.40°+0.34° −0.22°
- Argument of periastron: 188°+32° −34°
- Semi-amplitude: 2.27±0.28 m/s
- Star: K2-3

Physical characteristics
- Mean radius: 2.078+0.076 −0.067 R_{🜨}
- Mass: 5.11+0.65 −0.64 M_{🜨}
- Mean density: 3.11+0.49 −0.46 g/cm^{3}
- Temperature: 501.3+5.1 −5.2 K (228.2 °C; 442.7 °F, equilibrium)

K2-3b, also known as EPIC 201367065 b, is an exoplanet orbiting the red dwarf K2-3 every 10 days. It is the largest and most massive planet of the K2-3 system, with about 2.1 times the radius of Earth and about 5 times the mass. Its density of about 3.1 g/cm^{3} may indicate a composition of almost entirely water, or a hydrogen envelope comprising about 0.7% of the planet's mass.
