= Gliese 12 =

Red dwarf star

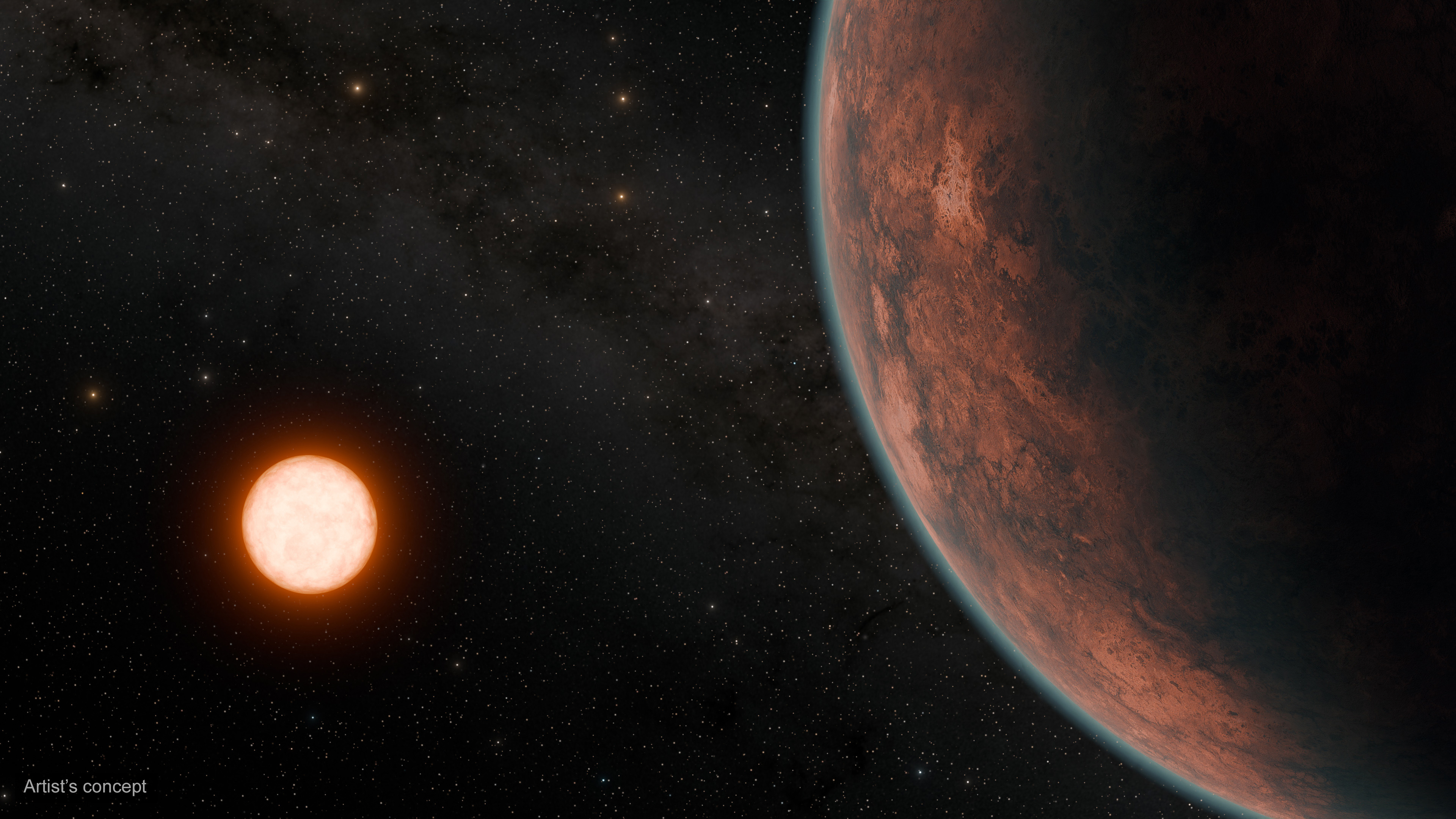
- Artist's impression of Gliese 12 and its planet (foreground)

Observation data Epoch J2000 Equinox ICRS
- Constellation: Pisces
- Right ascension: 00^{h} 15^{m} 49.24231^{s}
- Declination: +13° 33′ 22.3163″
- Apparent magnitude (V): 12.6

Characteristics
- Evolutionary stage: main sequence
- Spectral type: M4V
- Apparent magnitude (V): 12.600±0.04
- Apparent magnitude (R): 12.296±0.08
- Apparent magnitude (G): 11.399±0.003
- Apparent magnitude (J): 8.619±0.020
- Apparent magnitude (H): 8.068±0.026
- Apparent magnitude (K): 7.807±0.020

Astrometry
Radial velocity (R_{v})	51.04±0.26 km/s
Proper motion (μ)	RA: 618.065 mas/yr Dec.: 329.446 mas/yr
Parallax (π)	82.1938±0.0326 mas
Distance	39.68 ± 0.02 ly (12.166 ± 0.005 pc)

Details
Mass	0.2414±0.0060 M_{☉}
Radius	0.2617+0.0058 −0.0070 R_{☉}
Luminosity (bolometric)	0.00728±0.00015 L_{☉}
Surface gravity (log g)	5.21±0.07 cgs
Temperature	3,296+48 −36 K
Metallicity [Fe/H]	−0.32±0.06 dex
Rotation	85 days
Rotational velocity (v sin i)	<2 km/s
Age	7.0+2.8 −2.2 Gyr

Other designations
- GJ 12, G 32-5, L 1154-29, LHS 1050, LP 464-42, LTT 10083, NLTT 786, PLX 42, TOI-6251, TIC 52005579, 2MASS J00154919+1333218

Database references
SIMBAD	data
Exoplanet Archive	data
ARICNS	data

Gliese 12 (GJ 12) is a red dwarf star located 39.7 light-years (12.2 parsecs) away in the constellation Pisces. It has about 24% the mass and 26% the radius of the Sun, and a temperature of about 3,296 K (3,023 °C; 5,473 °F). It is an inactive star and hosts one known exoplanet.

== Planetary system ==
The transiting exoplanet Gliese 12 b was discovered by TESS, and two independent studies confirming it as a planet were published in May 2024. Gliese 12 b is similar in size to Earth and Venus, and completes an orbit around its star every 12.8 days.

Initially its mass was poorly constrained but was determined to be less than 4 times that of Earth. Measurements gathered in 2025 studies provided mass measurements of 0.71 and 0.95 Earth masses (M_{🜨}). The latter also measured a planetary radius of 0.934 R_{🜨}, and found a density of 7.0+2.3
−2.1 g/cm^{3}, higher than the densities of the Solar System's terrestrial planets. This suggests a likely rocky composition, similar to Venus. While this, the former study used the discovery paper's radius (0.958 R_{🜨}) and found a lower density that give less constraints on its composition. Scenarios such as an Earth-like composition, volatile-dominated composition, iron-poor, or even a combination are all plausible.

Along with the planets of TRAPPIST-1 and LHS 1140 b, Gliese 12 b is one of the nearest known relatively temperate transiting exoplanets, and so is a promising target for the James Webb Space Telescope to determine whether it has retained an atmosphere. Gliese 12 b orbits slightly closer than the inner edge of its star's habitable zone, with an insolation between those of Earth and Venus. Its equilibrium temperature, assuming an albedo of zero, is 315 K (42 °C; 107 °F); if it has an atmosphere, the surface temperature would be greater than this. Assuming an albedo similar to Venus, the equilibrium temperature is 218 K (−55 °C; −67 °F).

The Gliese 12 planetary system (Note: Semi-major axis from Kuzuhara et al. (2024), radius, orbital period and inclination from Turner et al. (2025).)
Companion (in order from star)	Mass	Semimajor axis (AU)	Orbital period (days)	Eccentricity	Inclination (°)	Radius
b	0.71±0.12 or 0.95+0.26 −0.27 M_{🜨}	0.0668±0.0024	12.761421(47)	0.16+0.14 −0.09 or 0.25±0.13	89.236+0.069 −0.061	0.904+0.037 −0.034 R_{🜨}
