= TOI-715 b =

First exoplanet discovered by TESS in the conservative habitable zone

Discovery
- Discovered by: Dransfield et al.
- Discovery site: TESS
- Discovery date: May 10, 2023
- Detection method: transit

Orbital characteristics
- Semi-major axis: 0.083±0.0027 AU
- Inclination: 89.856°+0.018° −0.017°
- Star: TOI-715

Physical characteristics
- Mean radius: 1.55±0.064 R_{🜨}
- Temperature: 234±12 K (−39±12 °C)

TOI-715 b is a super-Earth exoplanet in the habitable zone of its parent M-type star, TOI-715. The planet is 1.55 times larger than Earth, and is located at 0.083 astronomical units (12,400,000 km) from its star. The planet orbits in the habitable zone of its star and has an equilibrium temperature of 234 K (−39 °C). It was discovered by the Transiting Exoplanet Survey Satellite (TESS) in 2023; according to the authors of the discovery paper, it is the first TESS discovery in the conservative habitable zone.

NASA stated that the James Webb Space Telescope may be used in the future to look for evidence of water or planetary atmosphere. Additionally, there may be a second exoplanet in the same system, TIC 271971130.02, that, if confirmed, would be the smallest known habitable-zone exoplanet.

== Conservative habitable zone ==
The concept of "conservative habitable zone" was defined by Koparappu et al. in 2014. It is the region where the planet receives insolation equivalent to 0.42 to 0.842 times the insolation received from Earth by the Sun. As TOI-715 b has a insolation of 0.67+0.15
−0.20 S_{🜨}, it is located inside the conservative habitable zone.

== TOI-715 ==
TOI-715 is a red dwarf star located 42 parsecs (140 ly) from the Earth in the constellation Volans, (Note: Obtained with a right ascension of 07^{h} 35^{m} 24.26^{s} and a declination of −73° 34′ 38.83″ on this website.) very close to the southern celestial pole. The star is smaller and cooler than the Sun and has an apparent magnitude of 16.7 and is too faint to be seen with the naked eye or even a small telescope.
