= Abel Méndez =

Planetary astrobiologist

Professor Abel Méndez is a planetary astrobiologist and Director, at the University of Puerto Rico at Arecibo. His research focuses on the habitability of potentially habitable exoplanets. Méndez is also a NASA MIRS Fellow with research experience at NASA, and the Arecibo Observatory.

He is best known for being one of the scientists who developed the Earth Similarity Index, a proposed characterization of how similar a planetary-mass object or natural satellite is to Earth.
