= K2-3 =

Red dwarf star in the constellation Leo

Observation data Epoch J2000 Equinox J2000
- Constellation: Leo
- Right ascension: 11^{h} 29^{m} 20.39171^{s}
- Declination: −01° 27′ 17.2817″
- Apparent magnitude (V): 12.168±0.009

Characteristics
- Evolutionary stage: Main sequence
- Spectral type: M0±0.5
- Apparent magnitude (J): 9.421±0.027
- Apparent magnitude (H): 8.805±0.044
- Apparent magnitude (K): 8.561±0.021
- Variable type: Planetary transit

Astrometry
Radial velocity (R_{v})	30.24±0.46 km/s
Proper motion (μ)	RA: 94.116 mas/yr Dec.: −78.003 mas/yr
Parallax (π)	22.7374±0.0220 mas
Distance	143.4 ± 0.1 ly (43.98 ± 0.04 pc)

Details
Mass	0.549+0.029 −0.027 M_{☉}
Radius	0.546+0.018 −0.016 R_{☉}
Luminosity (bolometric)	0.0587+0.0018 −0.0019 L_{☉}
Surface gravity (log g)	4.704+0.023 −0.026 cgs
Temperature	3844+61 −63 K
Metallicity [Fe/H]	−0.157+0.075 −0.080 dex
Rotation	40±2 d
Age	6.9±4.7 Gyr

Other designations
- EPIC 201367065, 2MASS J11292037-0127173, WISE J112920.45-012718.0, Gaia DR3 3796690380302214272

Database references
SIMBAD	data
Exoplanet Archive	data

K2-3, also known as EPIC 201367065, is a red dwarf star with three known planets. It is on the borderline of being a late orange dwarf/K-type star, but because of its temperature, it is classified as a red dwarf (4,000 K is typically the division line between spectral class M and K).

At a distance of 143 light-years (44 parsecs), the star's proximity means it is bright enough to make it feasible for astronomers to study the planets' atmospheres to determine whether they are like Earth's atmosphere and possibly conducive to life.

== Planetary system ==
K2-3 has three confirmed exoplanets, discovered in 2015. All are low-density super-Earths or sub-Neptunes, with the outermost orbiting near the inner edge of the habitable zone.

The K2-3 planetary system
Companion (in order from star)	Mass	Semimajor axis (AU)	Orbital period (days)	Eccentricity	Inclination (°)	Radius
b	5.11+0.65 −0.64 M_{🜨}	0.0778±0.0026	10.054626(0)	<0.094	89.588+0.12 −0.100	2.078+0.076 −0.067 R_{🜨}
c	2.68±0.85 M_{🜨}	0.1414±0.0047	24.646582(39)	<0.095	89.905+0.066 −0.088	1.582+0.057 −0.051 R_{🜨}
d	<1.6 M_{🜨}	0.2097±0.0070	44.556456(97)	<0.097	89.788+0.033 −0.029	1.458+0.056 −0.051 R_{🜨}
