= Revista Cubana de Física =

- Discipline: Physics
- Language: English, Spanish
- Edited by: E. Altshuler

Publication details
- History: 1981–present
- Publisher: Sociedad Cubana de Física and the Faculty of Physics of the University of Havana (Cuba)
- Frequency: Biannually
- Open access: Yes
- License: CC BY-NC 4.0

Standard abbreviations
- ISO 4: Rev. Cuba. Fís.

Indexing
- CODEN: RECFD7
- ISSN: 0253-9268 (print); 2224-7939 (web)
- LCCN: sf93094317
- OCLC no.: 60618363

Links
- Journal homepage

The Revista Cubana de Física (Cuban Journal of Physics) is a biannual peer-reviewed open access scientific journal published by the Sociedad Cubana de Física (Cuban Physical Society) and the Physics Faculty (University of Havana) that was established in 1981. It covers all aspects of physics, as well as the history of physics in Latin America and especially in Cuba. Contributions are published either in Spanish or English. In addition to regular issues, occasional special issues contain the proceedings of international events, particularly the general meetings of the Cuban Physical Society. The editor-in-chief is E. Altshuler (University of Havana).

== Abstracting and indexing ==
The journal is abstracted and indexed in:

- Applied Science & Technology Index
- Current Physics Index
- Emerging Sources Citation Index
- Scopus
- SPIN bibliographic database
