= Planetary Habitability Laboratory =

Virtual laboratory for potentially habitable exoplanets

The Planetary Habitability Laboratory (PHL) is a research remote laboratory intended to study the habitability of the Solar System and other stellar systems, specifically, potentially habitable exoplanets. The PHL is managed by the University of Puerto Rico at Arecibo with the collaboration of international scientists from different organizations including the SETI Institute and NASA. The Laboratory is directed by astrobiologist Professor Abel Méndez. PHL is especially known for its Habitable Worlds Catalog (formerly Habitable Exoplanets Catalog), one of the most comprehensive catalogs on exoplanetary habitability.

== See also ==
- List of potentially habitable exoplanets
