= Kepler-725 =

Sun-like star in the Lyra constellation with two exoplanets

Observation data Epoch J2000 Equinox ICRS
- Constellation: Lyra
- Right ascension: 18^{h} 55^{m} 54.59951^{s}
- Declination: +44° 48′ 41.5433″
- Apparent magnitude (V): 15.23

Characteristics
- Evolutionary stage: main sequence
- Spectral type: G9V
- Apparent magnitude (J): 13.685±0.027
- Apparent magnitude (H): 13.283±0.026
- Apparent magnitude (K): 13.222±0.038

Astrometry
Proper motion (μ)	RA: −0.500 mas/yr Dec.: +4.995 mas/yr
Parallax (π)	1.2912±0.0233 mas
Distance	2,530 ± 50 ly (770 ± 10 pc)

Details
Mass	0.95±0.01 M_{☉}
Radius	0.88+0.05 −0.03 R_{☉}
Surface gravity (log g)	4.53±0.06 cgs
Temperature	5,395±64 K
Metallicity [Fe/H]	0.12±0.04 dex
Rotation	17.459±0.022 d
Age	1.60±0.04 Gyr

Other designations
- Kepler-725, KOI-918, KIC 8672910, 2MASS J18555459+4448416

Database references
SIMBAD	data
Exoplanet Archive	data

Kepler-725 is a Sun-like star located about 2,526 light-years (774 parsecs) away in the constellation of Lyra. At an apparent magnitude of 15.1, it is too faint to be seen with the naked eye. It has a spectral type of G9V, which classifies it as a yellow dwarf star.

== Planetary system ==
Kepler-725 has two confirmed planets. The transiting planet Kepler-725 b was discovered in 2016 and is a gas giant with orbital period of 40 days. The non-transiting planet Kepler-725 c was found in 2025 via the transit-timing variation (TTV) method and has a mass of about 10 times Earth mass. This planet receives an average insolation 1.4 times that of Earth, varying depending on its position in its eccentric orbit. It is the first super-Earth partially in the habitable zone to be discovered via the TTV method, and the only known super-Earth in the habitable zone of a Sun-like star with a measured mass (that is not a minimum mass).

Another planetary candidate with a period of 5.7 days, designated KOI-918.02, is a false positive.

The Kepler-725 planetary system (Note: The mass of planet b is not known, but the model used here assumes it has the mass of Jupiter.)
Companion (in order from star)	Mass	Semimajor axis (AU)	Orbital period (days)	Eccentricity	Inclination (°)	Radius
b	—	0.2238±0.0008	39.643151(59)	0.231+0.050 −0.044	89.8±0.1	10.8±0.6 R_{🜨}
c	9.7+3.3 −2.3 M_{🜨}	0.6744±0.0023	207.541+0.348 −0.248	0.436±0.017	—	—
