= TOI-2285 b =

Sub-Neptune exoplanet

Discovery
- Discovery date: 2021
- Detection method: TESS

Orbital characteristics
- Orbital period (sidereal): 13.64 days
- Star: TOI-2285

Physical characteristics
- Mean radius: 1.77+0.12 −0.09 R_{🜨}
- Temperature: 358 ± 8 K (84.85 ± 8.00 °C)

TOI-2285 b is a sub-Neptune exoplanet in orbit around the M-type star TOI-2285.

The planet was identified through transit signals in data from the Transiting Exoplanet Survey Satellite (TESS).

Initially, researchers reported an orbital period of 27.3 days, which put the planet near the outer edge of the habitable zone with an equilibrium temperature around 284 K (11 °C). Later analysis of additional TESS sectors revealed that the true period is 13.64 days. This correction increases the estimated equilibrium temperature to 358 K (85 °C).
