= Kepler-1638 =

G-type star in the constellation Cygnus

- Constellation where Kepler-1638 is located

Observation data Epoch J2000.0 Equinox J2000.0
- Constellation: Cygnus
- Right ascension: 19^{h} 41^{m} 55.76712^{s}
- Declination: +48° 31′ 27.9998″
- Apparent magnitude (V): 14.769±0.206

Characteristics
- Evolutionary stage: subgiant
- Spectral type: G
- Apparent magnitude (J): 13.550±0.023
- Apparent magnitude (H): 13.204±0.024
- Apparent magnitude (K): 13.138±0.035
- Variable type: Planetary transit

Astrometry
| Proper motion (μ) | RA: −5.092 mas/yr Dec.: +5.839 mas/yr |
| Parallax (π) | 0.6462±0.0165 mas |
| Distance | 5,000 ± 100 ly (1,550 ± 40 pc) |

Details
| Mass | 1.03 M_{☉} |
| Radius | 1.62 R_{☉} |
| Luminosity | 2.59 L_{☉} |
| Surface gravity (log g) | 4.03 cgs |
| Temperature | 5,745 K |
| Metallicity [Fe/H] | −0.76+0.32 −0.26 dex |
| Rotation | 27.7 days |
| Rotational velocity (v sin i) | 2.25 km/s |
| Age | 5.7+5.1 −2.6 Gyr |

Other designations
- KOI-5856, KIC 11037818, 2MASS J19415577+4831280

Database references
| SIMBAD | data |

Kepler-1638 is a G-type subgiant star located about 5,000 light years away in the constellation of Cygnus. One known exoplanet has been found orbiting the star: Kepler-1638b.As of January 2021, Kepler-1638 is the farthest star with a known exoplanet orbiting in the habitable zone.

== Planetary system ==
The Kepler-1638 planetary system
| Companion (in order from star) | Mass | Semimajor axis (AU) | Orbital period (days) | Eccentricity | Inclination | Radius |
|---|---|---|---|---|---|---|
| b | ~4.16 M_{🜨} | 0.745+0.021 −0.020 | 259.33683±0.01303 | — | 89.9954+0.0021 −0.0844° | 1.87+0.33 −0.22 R_{🜨} |

Kepler-1638 b is an exoplanet in orbit of its star, Kepler-1638, located in the constellation Cygnus. It was confirmed in 2016 as part of a study statistically validating hundreds of Kepler planets. Based on the parameters in the discovery paper, the planet is a super-Earth, with a radius of 1.87+0.33
−0.22 R_{🜨}, and a predicted mass of 4.16 Earths. It has an orbit of 259.337±0.013 days in its system's habitable zone and orbits 0.745 AU from its star. It is the most distant known exoplanet that is considered potentially habitable.

However, these parameters were estimated before the first measurement of the host star's parallax was published as part of Gaia DR2 in 2018. The Gaia parallax suggests a distance of about 1,548 parsecs (5,050 light-years), much farther than the pre-Gaia estimate of about 764 parsecs (2,490 light-years). This revised distance results in a significantly larger estimate of the radius of the star, and thus of the planet, with a 2018 study finding a planetary radius of 3.226+0.201
−0.315 R_{🜨}. This would make the planet an ice giant like Neptune, and thus not potentially habitable in an Earth-like sense.

== See also ==
- List of potentially habitable exoplanets
