= Gliese 180 =

Star in the constellation Eridanus

Observation data Epoch J2000 Equinox ICRS
- Constellation: Eridanus
- Right ascension: 04^{h} 53^{m} 49.97992^{s}
- Declination: −17° 46′ 24.3093″
- Apparent magnitude (V): 10.894

Characteristics
- Spectral type: M2V or M3V
- U−B color index: 1.155
- B−V color index: 1.549
- V−R color index: 1.018
- R−I color index: 1.205
- J−H color index: 0.553
- J−K color index: 0.815

Astrometry
Radial velocity (R_{v})	−14.87±0.14 km/s
Proper motion (μ)	RA: 408.573±0.012 mas/yr Dec.: −644.457±0.013 mas/yr
Parallax (π)	83.6897±0.0160 mas
Distance	38.972 ± 0.007 ly (11.949 ± 0.002 pc)
Absolute magnitude (M_{V})	10.48

Details
Mass	0.4316±0.0050 M_{☉}
Radius	0.4229±0.0047 R_{☉}
Luminosity	0.02427±0.00036 L_{☉}
Surface gravity (log g)	4.73+0.05 −0.07 cgs
Temperature	3,634+57 −40 K
Metallicity [Fe/H]	−0.12±0.16 dex
Rotation	65 days
Rotational velocity (v sin i)	3.4+1.9 −0.8 km/s
Age	5.0 Gyr

Other designations
- GJ 180, HIP 22762, L 736-30, LFT 377, LHS 1712, LP 776-27, LPM 198, LTT 2116, NLTT 14144, PLX 1097, TYC 5903-680-1, 2MASS J04534995-1746235, [RHG95] 838

Database references
SIMBAD	data
Exoplanet Archive	data
ARICNS	data

Gliese 180 (often shortened to GJ 180), is a small red dwarf star in the equatorial constellation of Eridanus. It is invisible to the naked eye with an apparent visual magnitude of 10.9. The star is located at a distance of 39 light years from the Sun based on parallax, and is drifting closer with a radial velocity of −14.6 km/s. It has a high proper motion, traversing the sky at the rate of 0.765 arcseconds per year.

The stellar classification of GJ 180 is catalogued as M2V or M3V, depending on the study, which indicates this is a dim red dwarf – an M-type main-sequence star that is generating energy by core hydrogen fusion. Reiners and associates (2012) do not consider it to be an active star. It is about five billion years old and is spinning with a projected rotational velocity of ~3 km/s, giving it a rotation period of about 65 days. The star has 43% of the Sun's mass and 42% of the radius of the Sun. It is radiating just 2.4% of the luminosity of the Sun from its photosphere at an effective temperature of 3,634 K.

== Planetary system ==
Gliese 180 is known to have at least two exoplanets, designated Gliese 180 b and Gliese 180 d, and possibly a third, Gliese 180 c; all are super-Earths or mini-Neptunes. Planets 'b' and 'c' were initially reported in 2014, and a follow-up study in 2020 confirmed planet 'b' and found a new planet 'd', but did not find the previously claimed planet 'c'. According to the 2014 study, planets 'b' and 'c' have an orbital period ratio of 7:5, which suggests a mean motion resonance that is stabilizing the orbits. The habitable zone of this star, by the criteria of Kopparapu and associates (2013), ranges from 0.12 AU out to 0.24 AU, which thus includes planet 'c'.

According to the Planetary Habitability Laboratory (PHL) in Puerto Rico, both b and c worlds in the system may be classifiable as potentially habitable planets. Planets Gliese 180 b and Gliese 180 c have minimum masses of 6.4 and 8.3 Earth masses, respectively. However, Dr Mikko Tuomi, of the UK's University of Hertfordshire, whose team identified the planets, disagreed, stating:

"The PHL adds some sort of an “extended HZ”, which I, frankly, do not know how it’s calculated, but that adds some areas of potential habitability to the inner and outer edges of the HZ as we have defined it. They included the inner companion of the GJ 180 system (planet b) that we consider too hot to be potentially habitable.”

However, as of 2022, the PHL lists only planets c and d, not b, as potentially habitable.

The Gliese 180 planetary system
Companion (in order from star)	Mass	Semimajor axis (AU)	Orbital period (days)	Eccentricity	Inclination (°)	Radius
b	≥6.49±0.68 M_{🜨}	0.092±0.003	17.133±0.003	0.07±0.04	—	—
с (unconfirmed)	≥6.4+3.7 −4.1 M_{🜨}	0.129+0.007 −0.017	24.329+0.052 −0.066	0.09+0.20 −0.09	—	—
d	≥7.56±1.07 M_{🜨}	0.309±0.010	106.300±0.129	0.14±0.04	—	—

== See also ==
- List of exoplanets discovered in 2014 (Gliese 180 b & c)
- List of exoplanets discovered in 2020 (Gliese 180 d)
