= Ross 508 =

Red dwarf star

Observation data Epoch J2000 Equinox J2000
- Constellation: Serpens
- Right ascension: 15^{h} 23^{m} 51.13709^{s}
- Declination: +17° 27′ 57.4439″
- Apparent magnitude (V): 14.18±0.20

Characteristics
- Evolutionary stage: Main sequence
- Spectral type: M4.5
- Apparent magnitude (V): 14.18±0.20
- Apparent magnitude (G): 12.195±0.003
- Apparent magnitude (J): 9.105±0.024
- Apparent magnitude (H): 8.620±0.032
- Apparent magnitude (K): 8.279±0.023

Astrometry
Radial velocity (R_{v})	42.14±0.39 km/s
Proper motion (μ)	RA: −391.919±0.034 mas/yr Dec.: −1259.296±0.034 mas/yr
Parallax (π)	89.1284±0.0331 mas
Distance	36.59 ± 0.01 ly (11.220 ± 0.004 pc)
Absolute magnitude (M_{V})	13.5

Details
Mass	0.1774±0.0045 M_{☉}
Radius	0.2113±0.0063 R_{☉}
Luminosity (bolometric)	0.003589+0.000067 −0.000071 L_{☉}
Surface gravity (log g)	5.039±0.027 cgs
Temperature	3071+34 −22 K
Metallicity [Fe/H]	−0.20±0.20 dex

Other designations
- GJ 585, Ci 20 930, G 137-2, G 136-103, LFT 1203, LHS 396, LSPM J1523+1727, LTT 14584, NLTT 40124, PLX 3481, PM 15216+1739, PM J15238+1727, Ross 508, TIC 400019820, 2MASS J15235112+1727569

Database references
SIMBAD	data

Ross 508 is a 13th magnitude red dwarf star, 11.2183 parsecs (36.5892 ly) away. The Ross catalog is named after Frank Elmore Ross who published a first list of 86 high proper motion stars in 1925. In 2022 it was discovered to have a super-Earth, Ross 508 b, orbiting every 10.77 days, detected by doppler spectroscopy.

The Ross 508 planetary system
Companion (in order from star)	Mass	Semimajor axis (AU)	Orbital period (days)	Eccentricity	Inclination	Radius
b	≥4.00+0.53 −0.55 M_{🜨}	0.05366+0.00056 −0.00049	10.77±0.01	0.33+0.13 −0.15	—	—
