= Kepler-1544b =

Extrasolar planet

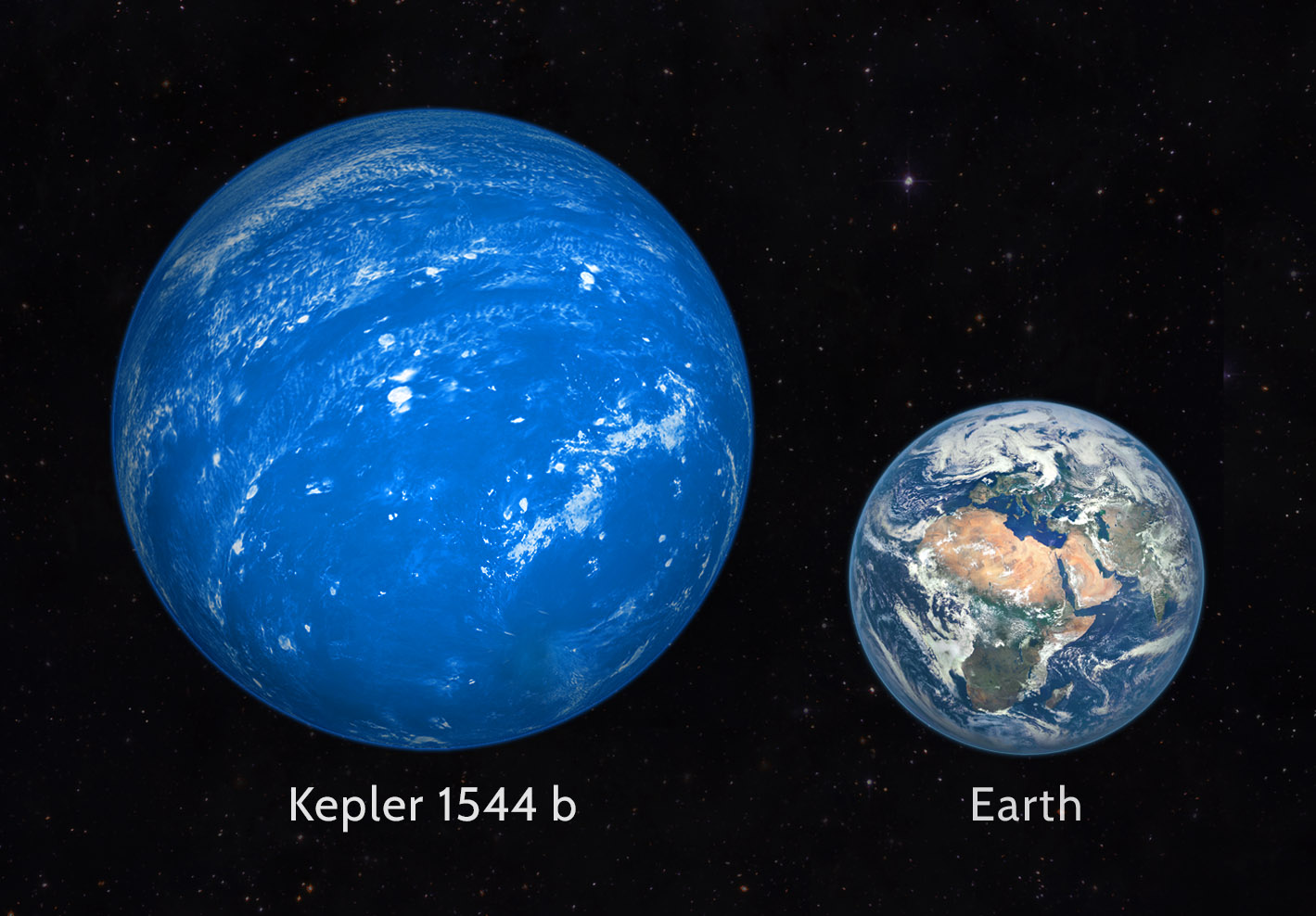
- Size comparison of the planet Kepler-1544b (artistic concept) with Earth

Discovery
- Discovered by: Kepler space telescope
- Discovery date: 2016

Orbital characteristics
- Eccentricity: 0
- Orbital period (sidereal): 168.811174±0.001271 d
- Star: Kepler-1544

Physical characteristics
- Mean radius: 0.159+0.008 −0.006 R_{J}

Kepler-1544b is a potentially habitable (optimistic sample) exoplanet announced in 2016 and located 1138 light years away, in the constellation of Cygnus.

== Characteristics ==
The planet orbits the K-type star Kepler-1544, which has a metallicity ([FE/H]) of −0.08 and an effective temperature of 4,820 K.

Kepler-1544b is considered a super-Earth with a radius of 1.71 Earth radii.

== Habitability ==
With an orbital period of 168 days, the exoplanet is located at 0.54 AU from the star, which is close to the orbital distance at Earth's equivalent radiation (0.49 AU).
