= TOI-715 =

Red dwarf star in the constellation Volans

Observation data Epoch J2000 Equinox J2000
- Constellation: Volans
- Right ascension: 07^{h} 35^{m} 24.26^{s}
- Declination: −73° 34′ 38.8″
- Apparent magnitude (V): 16.683

Characteristics
- Evolutionary stage: Red dwarf
- Spectral type: M4V

Astrometry
Proper motion (μ)	RA: 82.628 mas/yr Dec.: 9.924 mas/yr
Parallax (π)	23.5124±0.0173 mas
Distance	138.7 ± 0.1 ly (42.53 ± 0.03 pc)

Details
Mass	0.225±0.012 M_{☉}
Radius	0.24±0.012 R_{☉}
Temperature	3075±75 K
Metallicity [Fe/H]	0.09±0.2 dex
Age	6.6+3.3 −2.2 Gyr

Other designations
- 2MASS J07352425-7334388, Gaia DR2 5262666416118954368, TIC 271971130, TOI‐715, UCAC4 083-012601, WISE J073524.45-733438.8

Database references
SIMBAD	data

TOI-715 is a red dwarf star located 42 parsecs (140 ly) from the Earth in the constellation Volans, very close to the southern celestial pole. It hosts one confirmed exoplanet, named TOI-715 b, a super-Earth orbiting in its habitable zone. Another planet in the system is suspected. The star has an apparent magnitude of 16.7 and is too faint to be seen with the naked eye or even a small telescope. It is smaller and cooler than the Sun, with 24% its radius and a temperature of 3,075 K (2,802 °C) (53% solar).

== Characteristics ==
TOI-715 is a red dwarf star, a type of stars that are smaller, cooler and dimmer than the Sun, and are the most common type of stars in the Universe. TOI-715 in particular has 24% of the Sun's radius, 23% of its mass, and a surface temperature of 3,075 K (2,802 °C), while the Sun has a surface temperature of 5,772 K (5,499 °C). It is older than the Sun and has an age of 6.6+3.3
−2.2 billion years, and therefore has lower magnetic activity. Its metallicity, i.e. the abundance of elements other than hydrogen and helium, is 23% larger than the Sun's. (Note: Derived from a metallicity of 0.09 dex. 10^0.09 = 1.23.)

== Planetary system ==
In 2023, a planetary companion was detected around TOI-715. The planet was initially identified by the Transiting Exoplanet Survey Satellite (TESS), on May 24, 2019, and later confirmed using ground-based photometry. Designated TOI-715 b, the planet is a super-Earth (radius = 1.55 R_{🜨}) that is orbiting within its star's conservative habitable zone, being the first TESS discovery in this region. The planet has an orbital period of 19 days and is orbiting TOI-715 at a distance of 0.083 astronomical units (12,400,000 km). It receives insolation from its host star equivalent to 67% of the insolation received by the Earth from the Sun, and has an equilibrium temperature of -39 °C.

Another planet in the system is suspected. This planet has an orbital period of 25.6 days and has a radius of 1.066 R_{🜨}. It is located in the outer edge of the habitable zone. If confirmed, it would be the smallest habitable-zone planet discovered by TESS.

The planet TOI-715 b could be more closely scrutinized by the James Webb Space Telescope for confirming the existence of an atmosphere. If TOI-715 b is an ocean planet, its atmosphere would be more prominent and easier to detect than that of a massive, dense, dry planet. The planet can also be characterized with precise radial velocity measurements and transmission spectroscopy, and detailed follow-up research of this planet can help the understanding of the formation of small and close-in planets.

The planetary system of TOI-715 is located relatively close to Earth, at a distance of 137 light-years.

=== Conservative habitable zone ===
The concept of "conservative habitable zone" was defined by Koparappu et al. in 2014. It is the region where the planet receives insolation equivalent to 0.42 to 0.842 times the insolation received by the Earth from the Sun. As both planets have insolations equivalent to 0.67+0.15
−0.20 S_{🜨} and 0.48+0.12
−0.17 S_{🜨} respectively, they are located inside the conservative habitable zone.

The TOI-715 planetary system
Companion (in order from star)	Mass	Semimajor axis (AU)	Orbital period (days)	Eccentricity	Inclination (°)	Radius
b	—	0.0830±0.0027	19.288	—	89.856+0.018 −0.017	1.55±0.064 R_{🜨}
TOI-715.02 (unconfirmed)	—	0.0986±0.0054	25.607	—	89.72+0.14 −0.12	1.066±0.092 R_{🜨}
