= K2-3d =

Mini-Neptune orbiting K2-3

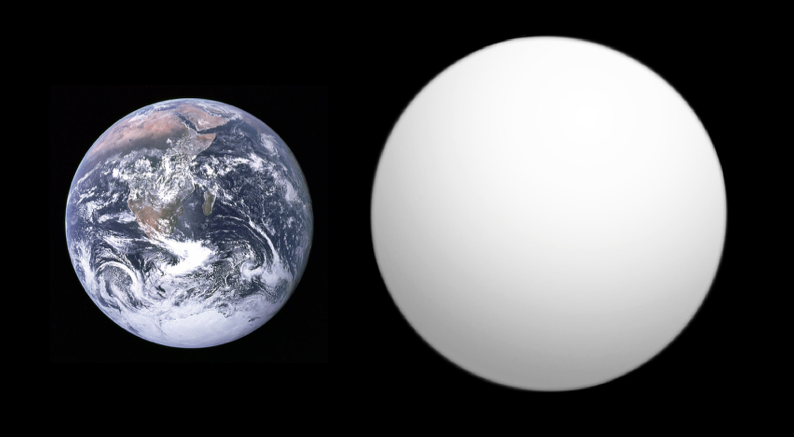
- Size comparison between the Earth and K2-3d.

Discovery
- Discovery site: Kepler Space Observatory
- Discovery date: 2015
- Detection method: Transit

Orbital characteristics
- Semi-major axis: 0.2014+0.0034 −0.0033 AU
- Eccentricity: 0.091+0.120 −0.064
- Orbital period (sidereal): 44.55603+0.00013 −0.00012 d
- Inclination: 89.788°+0.033° −0.029°
- Semi-amplitude: <0.39 m/s
- Star: K2-3

Physical characteristics
- Mean radius: 1.458+0.056 −0.051 R_{🜨}
- Mass: <1.6 M_{🜨}
- Mean density: <2.1 g/cm^{3}
- Temperature: 305.2+3.1 −3.2 K (32.1 °C; 89.7 °F, equilibrium)

K2-3d, also known as EPIC 201367065 d, is a confirmed exoplanet of probable mini-Neptune type orbiting the red dwarf star K2-3, and the outermost of three such planets discovered in the system. It is located 143 light-years (44 parsecs) away from Earth in the constellation of Leo. The exoplanet was found by using the transit method, in which the dimming effect that a planet causes as it crosses in front of its star is measured. It was the first planet in the Kepler "Second Light" mission to receive the letter "d" designation for a planet. Its discovery was announced in January 2015.

== Characteristics ==
=== Mass, radius, density and temperature ===
K2-3d is a super-Earth or a mini-Neptune, meaning it has a mass and radius bigger than Earth's, but smaller than that of the ice giants Uranus and Neptune. It has an equilibrium temperature of 305 K (32 °C; 89 °F) and a radius of 1.5 to 1.6 R_{🜨}. The planet is likely to be a mini-Neptune, with no solid surface. While originally estimated to have a very high density, later analysis of HARPS data in 2018 constrained the mass to less than 4 M_{🜨} to a 1σ confidence, and by 2023 this upper limit has been reduced to 2 M_{🜨}. This corresponds to a relatively low density, similar to that of Neptune, suggesting a very large volatile layer and significantly reducing the potential habitability of the world.

=== Host Star ===
The planet orbits a (M-type) red dwarf star named K2-3, orbited by a total of three known planets, of which K2-3d has the longest orbital period. The star has a mass of 0.60 M_{☉} and a radius of 0.56 R_{☉}. It has a temperature of 3896 K and is about 1 billion years old. In comparison, the Sun is 4.6 billion years old and has a surface temperature of 5778 K.

The star's apparent magnitude, or how bright it appears from Earth's perspective, is 12.168. Therefore, it is too dim to be seen with the naked eye.

=== Orbital statistics ===
K2-3d orbits its host star, which has about 6% of the Sun's luminosity, with an orbital period of 44 days and an orbital radius of about 0.2 times that of Earth (compared to the distance of Mercury from the Sun, which is about 0.38 AU).

== Habitability ==
The planet orbits on the edge of the inner (empirical) habitable zone, a region where, with the proper atmospheric properties and pressure, liquid water may exist on the surface of the planet. However, it is very likely tidally locked to its star, with one side facing towards its star in scorching heat, and the opposite side in bitter darkness. Despite this, there is an area – the terminator line – where the surface temperatures may be comfortable enough to support liquid water. However, given that most models of the habitable zone parameters put K2-3d slightly beyond the inner edge of the habitable zone, it is likely to be too hot even at the terminator line and thus not habitable at all. Also, the stellar flux for the planet is an abnormally high 1.4 times that of Earth, which could result in surface temperatures of up to 400–500 K (127–227 °C; 260–440 °F) because of a runaway greenhouse effect.

== Discovery ==
The planet, along with the other two known planets in the K2-3 system, was announced in early January 2015 as part of the first results from the second mission of the Kepler spacecraft. With this, it was the first multiplanetary system of the mission as well.

== See also ==
- List of potentially habitable exoplanets
