= Earth Similarity Index =

Scale for how similar a planet is to earth

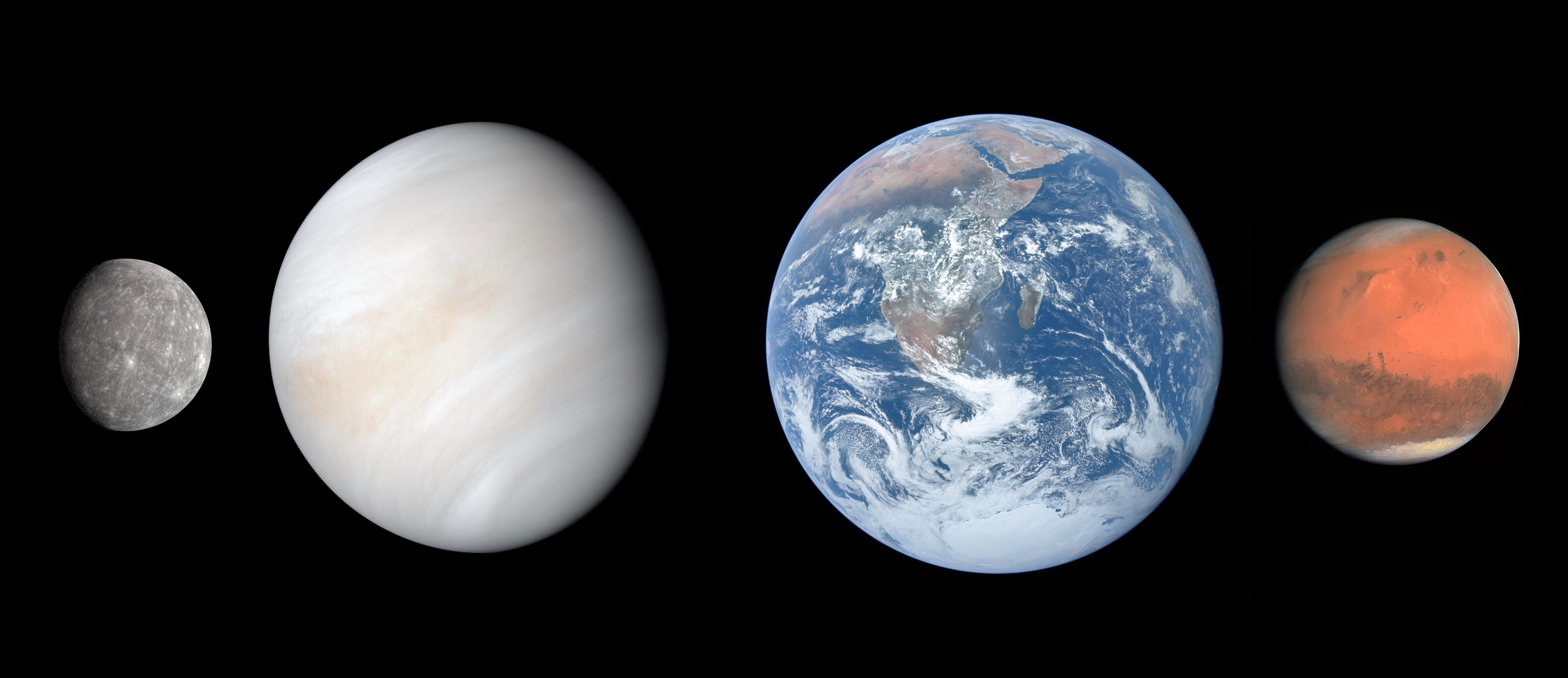
Though differing in size and temperature, terrestrial planets of the Solar System were reported to have high Earth Similarity Index values – Mercury, Venus, Earth and Mars. Sizes to scale.

The Earth Similarity Index (ESI) is a proposed characterization of how similar a planetary-mass object or natural satellite is to Earth. It was designed to be a scale from zero to one, with Earth having a value of one; this is meant to simplify planet comparisons from large databases.

The scale has no quantitative meaning for habitability.

== Formulation ==
The ESI, as proposed in 2011 by Schulze-Makuch et al. in the journal Astrobiology, incorporates a planet's radius, density, escape velocity, and surface temperature into the index. Thus the authors describe the index as having two components: (1) associated with the interior which is associated with the mean radius and bulk density, and (2) associated with the surface which is associated with the escape velocity and surface temperature. An article on the ESI formulation derivation is made available by Kashyap Jagadeesh et al.(2017). ESI was also referenced in an article published in Revista Cubana de Física.

For exoplanets, in almost every case only the planet's orbital period along with either the proportional dimming of the star due to the planet's transit or the radial velocity variation of the star in response to the planet is known with any degree of certainty, and so every other property not directly determined by those measurements is speculative. For example, while surface temperature is influenced by a variety of factors including irradiance, tidal heating, albedo, insolation and greenhouse warming, as these factors are not known for any exoplanet, quoted ESI values use planetary equilibrium temperature as a stand-in.

A webpage maintained by one of the authors of the 2011 Astrobiology article, Abel Méndez at the University of Puerto Rico at Arecibo, lists his calculations of the index for various exoplanetary systems. Méndez's ESI is calculated as

$$\mathsf{ESI} = \prod_{i=1}^{n}\left(1-\Big\vert\frac{x_i - x_{i0}}{x_i + x_{i0}}\Big\vert\right)^\frac{w_i}{n}$$,

where $x_i$ and $x_{i0}$ are properties of the extraterrestrial body and of Earth respectively, $w_i$ is the weighted exponent of each property, and $n$ is the total number of properties. It is comparable to, and constructed from, the Bray–Curtis Similarity Index. The weight assigned to each property, $w_i$, are free parameters that can be chosen to emphasize certain characteristics over others or to obtain desired index thresholds or rankings. The webpage also ranks what it describes as the habitability of planets and moons according to three criteria: the location in the habitable zone, ESI, and a speculation as to a capacity to sustain organisms at the bottom of the food chain, a different index collated on the webpage identified as the "Global Primary Habitability scale".

The 2011 Astrobiology article and the ESI values found in it received press attention at the time of the article's publication. As a result, Mars was reported to have the second-highest ESI in the Solar System with a value of 0.70. A number of exoplanets listed in that article were reported to have values in excess of this.

Other ESI values that have been reported by third parties include the following sources:

== No relation to habitability ==
Although the ESI does not characterize habitability, given the point of reference is the Earth, some of its functions match those used by habitability measures. As with the definition of the habitable zone, the ESI uses surface temperature as a primary function (and the terrestrial point of reference). A 2016 article uses ESI as a target selection scheme and obtains results showing that the ESI has little relation to the habitability of an exoplanet, as it takes no account of the activity of the star, planetary tidal locking, nor the planet's magnetic field (i.e. ability to protect itself) which are among the keys to habitable surface conditions.

It has been noted that ESI fails to differentiate between Earth similarity and Venus similarity, where planets with a lower ESI have a greater chance at habitability.

== Planets with an Earth-like size ==
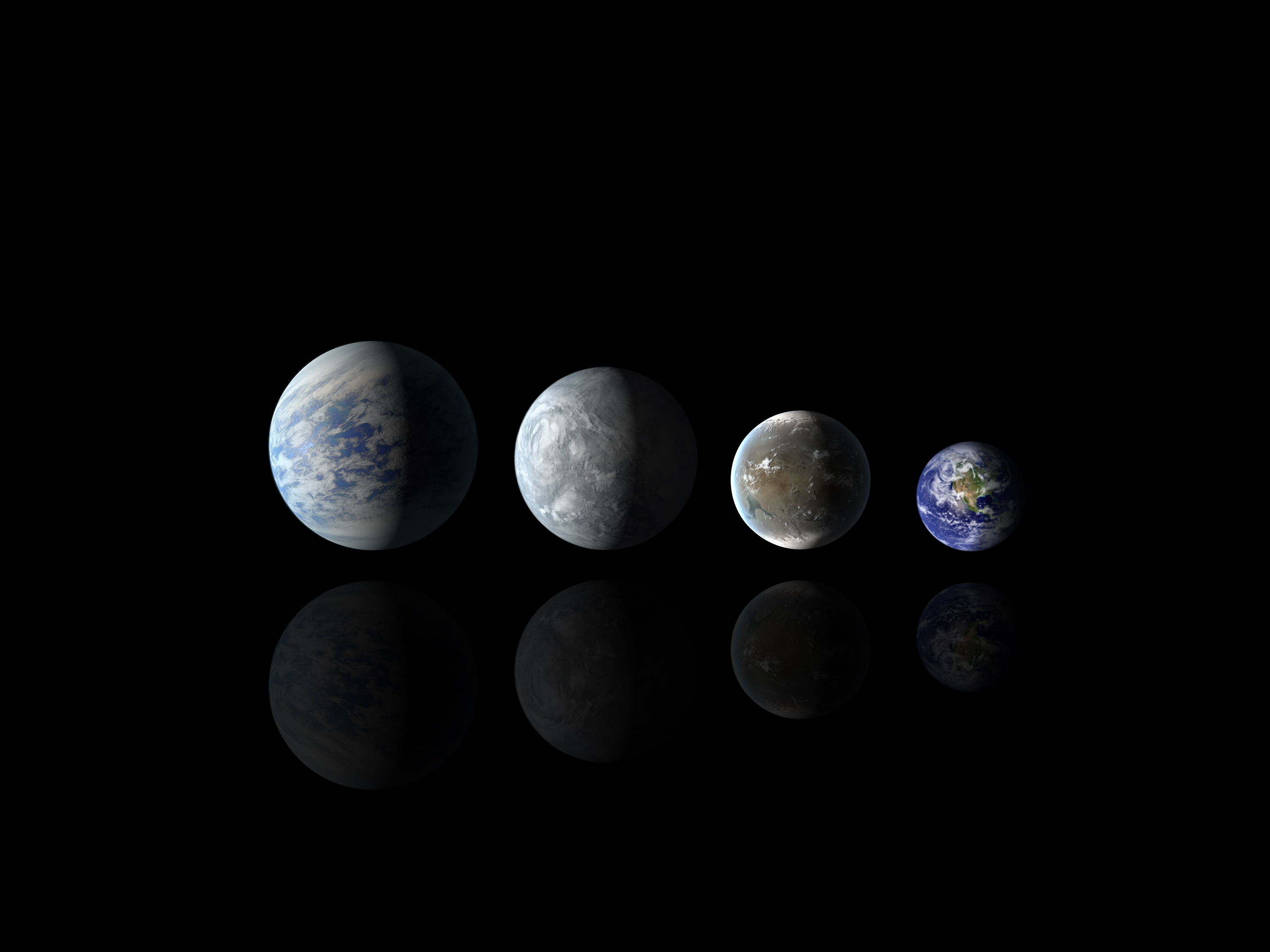
Comparison of the sizes of planets Kepler-69c, Kepler-62e, Kepler-62f, and the Earth. All planets except the Earth are artists' conceptions.

The classification of exoplanets is difficult in that many methods of exoplanet detection leave several features unknown. For example, with the transit method, measurement of radius can be highly accurate, but mass and density are often estimated. Likewise with radial velocity methods, which can provide accurate measurements of mass but are less successful measuring radius. Planets observed via a number of different methods therefore can be most accurately compared to Earth.

== Similarity of non-planets to Earth ==
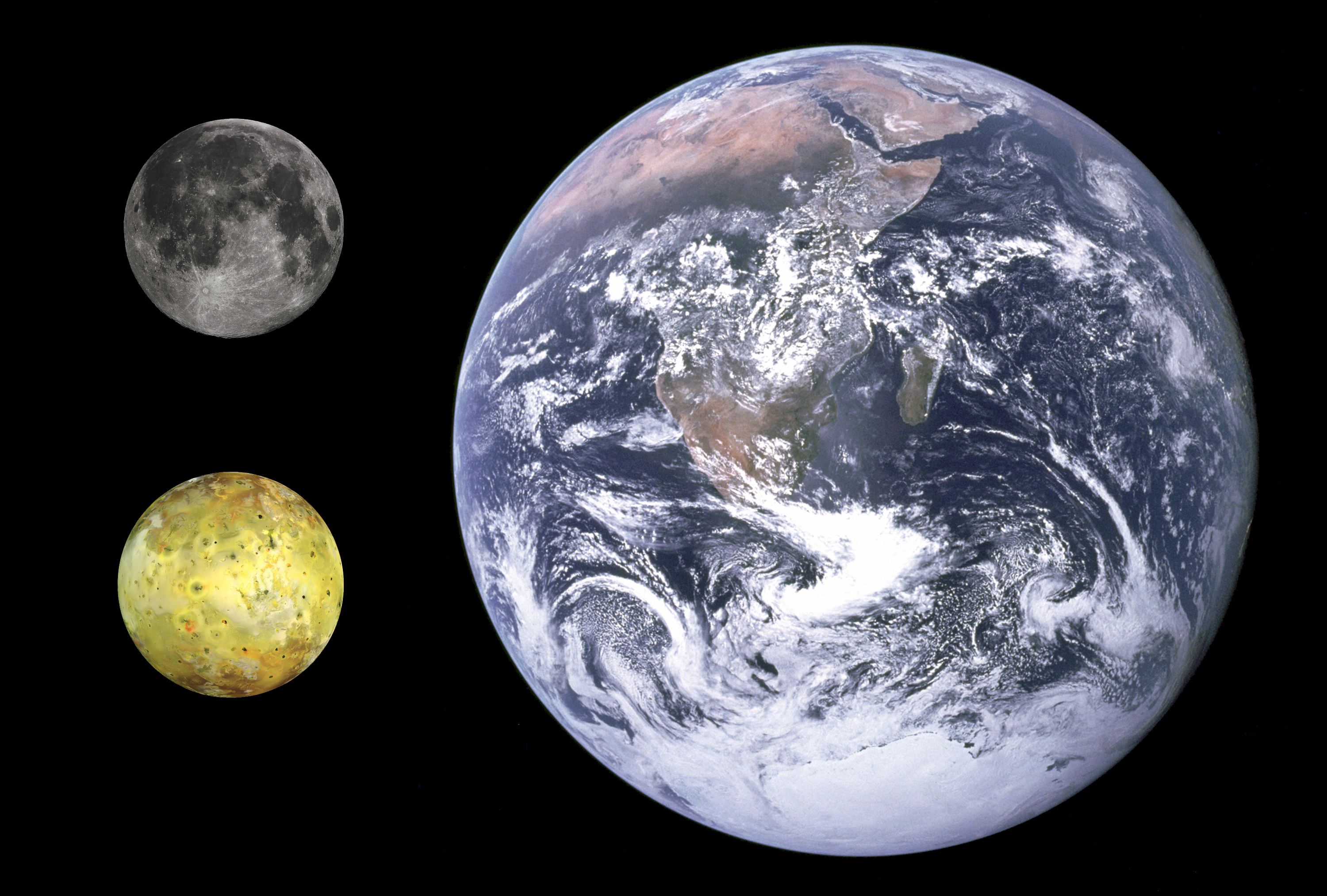
The Moon, Io and Earth shown to scale. Although significantly smaller, some of the Solar System's moons and dwarf planets share similarities to Earth's density and temperature.

The index can be calculated for objects other than planets, including natural satellites, dwarf planets and asteroids. The lower average density and temperature of these objects give them lower index values. Only Titan (a moon of Saturn) is known to hold on to a significant atmosphere despite an overall lower size and density. While Io (a moon of Jupiter) has a low average temperature, surface temperature on the moon varies wildly due to geologic activity.

== See also ==
- List of natural satellites
