= K2-18 =

Red dwarf star in the constellation Leo

- Approximate two-dimensional location of the star (in red circle); Sigma Leonis is the nearest bright star, which is in a southerly direction, and the boundary of Virgo is similarly far.

Observation data Epoch J2000.0 Equinox ICRS
- Constellation: Leo
- Right ascension: 11^{h} 30^{m} 14.51774^{s}
- Declination: +07° 35′ 18.2553″
- Apparent magnitude (V): 13.50

Characteristics
- Evolutionary stage: Main sequence
- Spectral type: M2.8

Astrometry
Radial velocity (R_{v})	0.02±0.52 km/s
Proper motion (μ)	RA: −80.479 mas/yr Dec.: −133.007 mas/yr
Parallax (π)	26.2469±0.0266 mas
Distance	124.3 ± 0.1 ly (38.10 ± 0.04 pc)

Details
Mass	0.495±0.004 M_{☉}
Radius	0.469±0.010 R_{☉}
Luminosity	0.0234 L_{☉}
Temperature	3,645±52 K
Metallicity [Fe/H]	+0.10±0.12 dex
Rotation	38.9 to 40.2 days
Age	2.9 to 3.1 Gyr

Other designations
- K2-18, EPIC 201912552, TIC 388804061, 2MASS J11301450+0735180

Database references
SIMBAD	data
Exoplanet Archive	data

K2-18, also known as EPIC 201912552, is a red dwarf star with two known exoplanets located 124 light-years (38 parsecs) from Earth, in the constellation of Leo.

Its name is because it was discovered by the K2 Mission, which extended the mission of the Kepler Space Telescope after failure of two of its reaction wheels.

== Planetary system ==
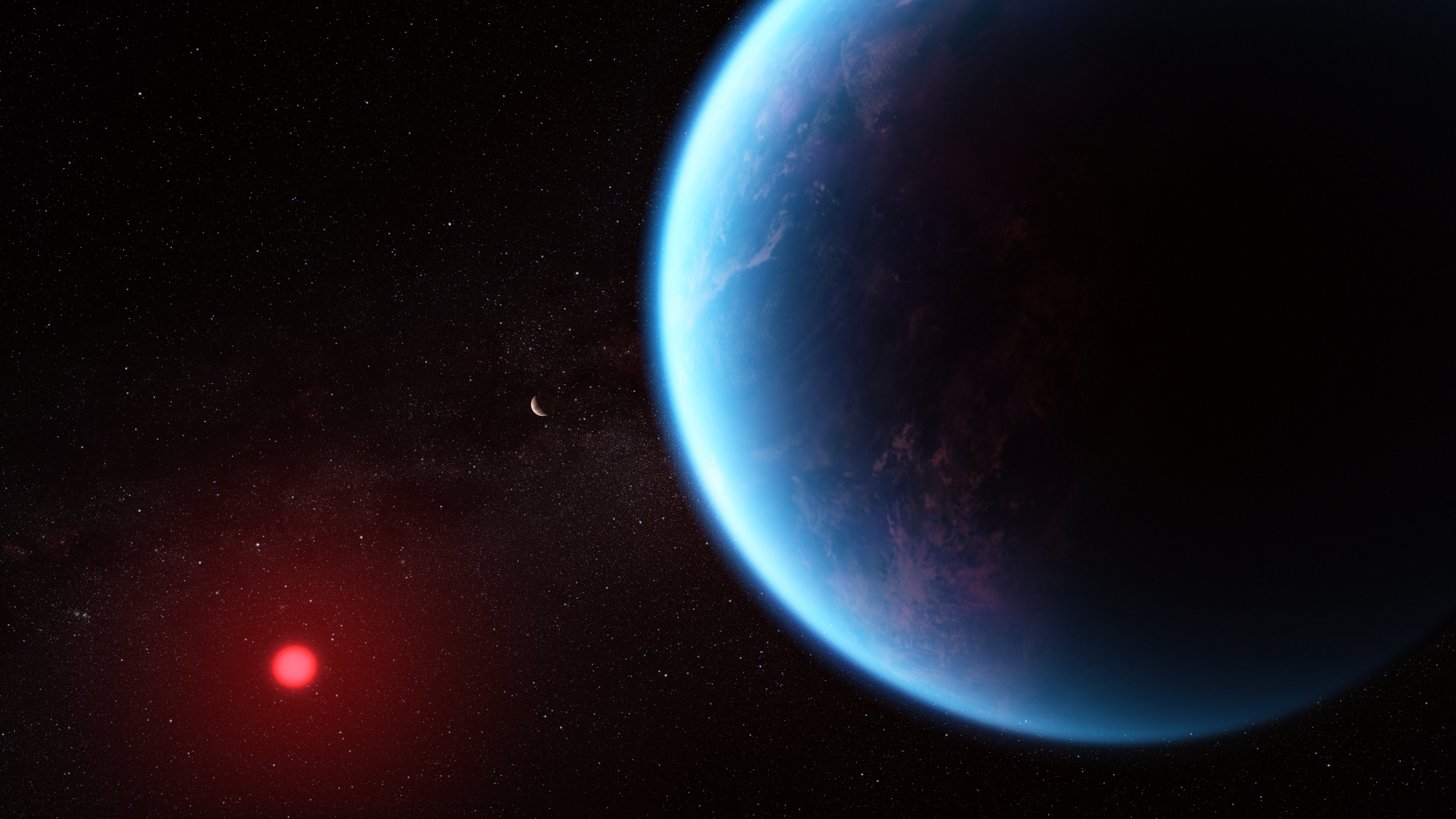
Artist's impression of the K2-18 system, with K2-18 on left, K2-18b on right, and K2-18c between (credit ESA/Hubble)

The star has a transiting exoplanet, called K2-18b, a super-Earth located within the habitable zone of K2-18. It was discovered in 2015 by the Kepler space telescope in its K2 mission. It is the first exoplanet in the habitable zone, albeit a hydrogen-rich sub-Neptune, to have its atmosphere characterized; initially thought to contain water vapor, more recent observations have instead detected methane and carbon dioxide. The presence of these molecules and non-detection of ammonia is consistent with predictions for a hycean planet.

A second, non-transiting planet, K2-18c, was discovered in 2017 by radial velocity with HARPS. This planet was challenged by another team with CARMENES data, but its existence was reaffirmed by the discovery team based on both HARPS and CARMENES data. This planet has also been confirmed by a later independent study. System tidal simulation suggests that K2-18c is a gas-rich, Neptune-like planet, similar to K2-18b.

The K2-18 planetary system
Companion (in order from star)	Mass	Semimajor axis (AU)	Orbital period (days)	Eccentricity	Inclination (°)	Radius
c	≥5.62±0.84 M_{🜨}	0.0670 ± 0.0002	9.2072±0.0065	<0.2	—	—
b	8.63±1.35 M_{🜨}	0.15910+0.00046 −0.00047	32.94488±0.00281	0.09+0.12 −0.09	—	2.610±0.087 R_{🜨}
