= Hycean planet =

Water-covered planet with a hydrogen-rich atmosphere

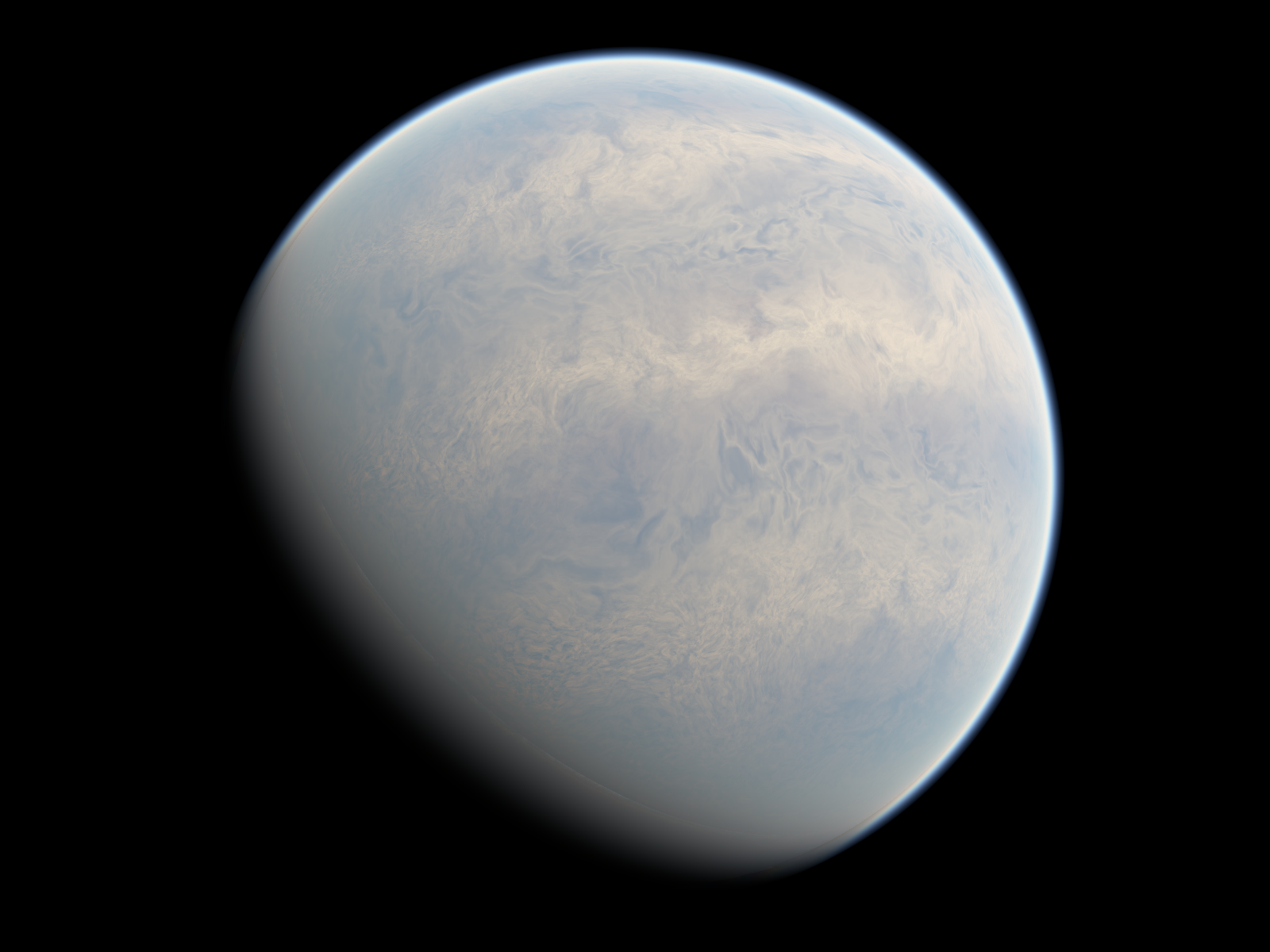
Depiction of a hycean planet.

A hycean planet (/ˈhaɪʃən/ HY-shən) is a hypothetical type of planet with liquid water oceans underneath a hydrogen-rich atmosphere. They are thought to offer conditions favorable to life.

== Definition ==
The term hycean is a portmanteau of hydrogen and ocean. Due to the presence of extraterrestrial liquid water, hycean planets are regarded as promising candidates for planetary habitability. They are usually considered to be larger and more massive than Earth. As of 2023, there are no confirmed hycean planets, but the Kepler mission detected many candidates.

== History ==
The term "hycean planet" was coined in 2021 by a team of planet researchers led by Nikku Madhusudhan at the University of Cambridge, as a portmanteau of "hydrogen" and "ocean," used to describe planets that are thought to have large oceans under hydrogen-rich atmospheres. Hycean planets are thought to be common around red dwarf stars, and are considered to be a promising place to search for life beyond Earth. The term was first used in a paper published in The Astrophysical Journal on August 31, 2021.

Life on hycean planets would probably be entirely aquatic. Their water-rich compositions imply that they can have larger sizes than comparable non-hycean planets, thus making their observation and the detection of biosignatures easier. Candidate hycean worlds such as K2-18b have been investigated for biosignatures by terrestrial telescopes and space telescopes like the James Webb Space Telescope (JWST). Whether Hycean planets can actually form with the required quantities of water is controversial.

Recent studies suggest that the habitable zones of exoplanets may be more complex and smaller than previously believed, with tidal heating potentially playing a crucial role in supporting life. K2-18b, a notable exoplanet, has emerged as a key object of interest due to its intriguing characteristics. Observations have indicated possible biosignatures in its atmosphere, making it a focal point in the search for extraterrestrial life.

== Properties ==
Hycean planets could be considerably larger than previous estimates for habitable planets, with radii reaching 2.6 R_{🜨} (2.3 R_{🜨}) and masses of 10 M_{🜨} (5 M_{🜨}). Moreover, the habitable zone of such planets could be considerably larger than that of Earth-like planets. The planetary equilibrium temperature can reach 430 K (157 °C; 314 °F) for planets orbiting late M-dwarfs. However, mass and radius do not by themselves inform the composition of a planet, as bodies with identical mass and radius can have distinct compositions: A given planet may thus be either a hycean planet or a super-Earth.

== Limitations ==
Such planets can have many distinct atmospheric compositions and internal structures. Also possible are tidally locked "dark hycean" planets (habitable only on the side of permanent night) or "cold hycean" planets (with negligible irradiation, being kept warm by the greenhouse effect). Dark Hycean worlds are the possibility of habitable conditions on the permanent nightside of Hycean planets that must be tidal-locked. The sources of energy in the nightside atmosphere of the planet are (a) energy redistributed from the dayside through atmospheric circulation and (b) the internal energy. Dark Hycean planets may be expected to be more prevalent around low-mass stars, e.g., M dwarfs. For hotter stars the Dark Hycean IHB may be beyond the tidal-locking separation. Dark hycean worlds can form when the atmosphere does not effectively transport heat from the permanent day side to the permanent night side, thus the night side has temperate temperatures while the day side is too hot for life. Cold hycean planets may exist even in the absence of stars, e.g. rogue planets.

Although the presence of water may help them be habitable planets, their habitability may be limited by a possible runaway greenhouse effect. As high surface temperatures make water vapor a nonnegligible component of the atmosphere, there comes a point where the atmosphere becomes optically thick to infrared radiation, decoupling the surface temperature from a fixed photospheric temperature. Water evaporates into the hydrogen-rich atmosphere from intense stellar radiation. The atmospheric structure is assumed to be on a moist adiabat. If surface temperature is high enough, high moisture contents will inhibit convection and lead to radiative layers in the lower atmosphere. A planet that maintains liquid water must have a negligible hydrogen-helium atmosphere in ratio to water vapor. This unphysical assumption predicts that warm temperatures will naturally lead to the water evaporating from the surface ocean and mixing with the hydrogen helium gas. The water vapor serves as a greenhouse gas, but would reduce the ability for the planet to cool. To sustain the desired instellation, a higher surface gravity planet will host a higher pressure atmosphere. Only a moderate pressure of hydrogen and helium will force surface temperatures to supercritical values (with solar installation approx. 10 bars will cause a large enough greenhouse effect). Hydrogen reacts differently to starlight's wavelengths than do heavier gases like nitrogen and oxygen. If the planet orbits a Sun-like star at one Astronomical unit (AU), the temperature would be so high that the oceans would boil and water would become vapor. Current calculations locate the habitable zone where water would remain liquid at 1.6 AU, if the atmospheric pressure is similar to Earth's, or at 3.85 AU if it is the more likely tenfold to twentyfold pressure. All current hycean planet candidates are located within the area where oceans would boil, and are thus unlikely to have actual oceans of liquid water. Another limiting factor is that X-ray and UV radiation from the star (especially active stars) can destroy the water molecules.

A moist greenhouse state is an important factor to consider when exploring long-term evolution of the surface environment for terrestrial water planets. This is the first process prior to the runaway greenhouse effect occurring, which is a consequence of the sun becoming brighter with time.

Another factor limiting the habitable zone of hycean planets is their orbital eccentricity. Planets with moderately eccentric orbits have their surface temperatures increase from tidal heating from their parent stars. This effect significantly truncates the habitable zone of the planet at larger orbital radii. It is thought that only a few hycean planets have been discovered where this effect significantly impacts the planet. Previous models of an exoplanet's orbit and where it places on the habitable zone have not taken into account the tidal forces between the planet and the star meaning many planets that are thought to be potentially habitable may not be. However, other planets on the system could stabilize the orbit of the hycean planets for billions of years in a process called “forced eccentricity”.

== Habitability ==
Hycean habitable zones revolve around stars with the requirement of deep liquid water on the surface of an Earthlike rocky planet. Habitable conditions on planets may be possible out to 1.5 au for M dwarf stars and 10 AU for G dwarfs. A detection of reliable biomarkers in the atmosphere are needed, based on Earth’s atmosphere which are proposed to be produced by abiogenic sources. Few abundant molecules that originate from metabolic process on Earth’s biosphere are organosulfur compounds such as dimethysulfide (DMS), dimethyldisulfide (DMDS), methanethiol (CH3SH), and carbonylsulfide (OCS). These molecules are studied to be prevalent in terrestrial exoplanets with similar biogenic sources as Earth under stellar hosts and atmospheric conditions. Microorganisms on Earth can also survive in H2 rich environments which includes up to ~88% concentration in natural environments and 100% in laboratory conditions. The organosulfur compounds are not very prominent biosignatures in H2 rich atmospheres, observable biosignatures would be gases released from secondary metabolic processes of microorganisms which are expected to be detected via JWST for rocky super Earths with hydrogen-rich atmospheres. The five prominent biomarkers in Hycean atmospheres and the large H2O ocean underneath makes Hycean worlds a promising candidate.

In the moist greenhouse state, the upper atmosphere becomes moist. In this case, a rapid hydrogen escape via the photodissociation of H2O vapor occurs. When the mixing ratio of water vapor in the upper atmosphere is larger than ~10−3, water comparable in total to Earth's oceans can escape into space in 4.6 billion years. It is suggested that a rapid water loss in the moist greenhouse state could extend the lifetime of habitability.

TESS is to be used within the next decades for mapping out exoplanets while JWST will focus on potentially habitable planets and characterize them. One challenge with these observations is the detection of water vapor. Some exoplanets with liquid vapor on the surface are not directly linked with water vapor. However the surface ratio of land to ocean would give information of a small fraction of water. Observational studies obtain this ratio, allowing for a distinguishment between aqua planets and land planets. Besides aqua planets, land planets have advantages over aqua worlds. They would increase the observational targets for characterization, clouds on the land planet are located in polar regions, compared to aqua planets. Land planets are also habitable for a longer time, which are better targets for the detection of biomarkers.

== Atmosphere ==
The atmospheric conditions are an important factor when determining the habitability of a planet. Hycean planets mainly contain H_{2} in their atmospheres and any remaining concentration of molecules is largely determined by various factors such as temperature, and solar insolation, among others. Atmospheric conditions can vary depending on the specific number of clouds and haze for each planet as that changes the albedo and can affect the planet's ability to retain liquid water. Having too much albedo can make the planet too hot for water and having too little can make it too cold. The main additional compounds that could be found are: H_{2}O, due to the potential ocean, CH_{4}, NH_{3}, CO, CO_{2}, although H_{2} and H_{2}O have the highest abundance by definition.

It is possible that the standard habitable zone may be expanded for Hycean worlds. The standard habitable zones are designed for terrestrial planets with elements such as N_{2} and CO_{2} in their atmospheres. For Earth, the equilibrium temperature is about 288°K (15°C), but for Hycean planets the equilibrium temperature could get up to about 500°K (227°C) before it may not be considered habitable anymore. This is because of the H_{2} in its atmosphere being able to maintain stronger greenhouse warming from the sun, meaning hycean planets may be able to sustain liquid water even closer to the sun than a terrestrial planet would be able to. The outer bounds are more complicated and it depends greatly on each specific Hycean world’s atmosphere. Low temperature but high pressures are needed. Additionally the greenhouse effect is large enough that the outer bounds for the habitable zone can be extended far but it is not known by how far, and would vary planet to planet.

The main way that Hycean worlds are being detected is through the transit method. Hycean worlds are favorable for this method because they are typically super Earths or Sub Neptunes which have a larger diameter and are therefore easier to detect compared to smaller planets. The transit method can also be used to detect elements or even biosignatures in the atmospheres of the planets. Specifically, James Webb Space Telescope (JWST) can be used to gather spectral data and use spectroscopy to see abundances of elements in a planet's atmosphere.

== Features ==
- They are regarded to be covered in oceans and seas.
- They have hydrogen-rich atmospheres. The atmospheres on hycean planets are thought to be made up of hydrogen, helium, and water vapor.
- Dark hycean planets thought to be common around red dwarf stars. Red dwarf stars are the most common type of star in the Milky Way galaxy.
- They are considered to be a promising place to search for life beyond Earth. Hycean planets have the ingredients that are necessary for life, including liquid water, energy, and organic molecules.
- Their atmospheres may have less methane and ammonia than comparable non-hycean Neptune-like planets, if they have water oceans.
- They might have a much higher free energy availability for their ecosystems than Earth.

Hycean planets may be capable of supporting extraterrestrial life, despite their properties differing drastically from Earth's. Astronomers use telescopes like the James Webb Space Telescope to search for hycean planets and to learn more about their potential for habitability.

== Candidates ==
=== K2-18b ===
One such candidate planet is K2-18b, which orbits a faint star with a period of about 33 days. This candidate planet could have liquid water, containing a considerable high amount of hydrogen gas in its atmosphere, and is far enough from its star, such that it resides within its star's habitable zone. Such candidate planets can be studied for biomarkers. In 2023, the James Webb Space Telescope detected carbon dioxide and methane in the atmosphere of K2-18b, but it did not detect large amounts of ammonia. This supports the hypothesis that K2-18b could indeed have a water ocean. The same observations also suggest that K2-18b's atmosphere might contain dimethyl sulfide, a compound associated with life on Earth. The presence of this compound was yet to be confirmed at the time, but evidence of dimethyl sulfide as well as dimethyl disulfide was found in 2025. Another possibility is that K2-18b is a lava world with a hydrogen atmosphere.

=== K2-3b ===
Exoplanet K2-3B is a potential candidate for a dark Hycean World. It was discovered by the Kepler space telescope using the transit method in 2015. It is orbiting an M class along with a 10.1 day period with three other exoplanets. K2-3B is classified as a Super Earth with a mass of 5.11 Earth Masses. It is believed that K2-3B is too close to its star to be within the habitable zone, although that property may not be detrimental to its overall habitability due its atmospheric retention combined with a greenhouse effect from the hydrogen concentration in its atmosphere. The planet may be close enough to its star to be tidally locked. This results in something called an eyeball planet. The side facing the star is generally hotter while the side facing away from the star may be much colder, leaving a thin band of habitable zone around the circumference of the planet where the day and night sides meet. It is estimated that K2-3B has a density anywhere from 3.11 to 3.70 g/cm^{3} making it less dense than the Earth which signifies less rock and possibly water on its surface or water vapor in the atmosphere. Minimal information is known about this candidate planet and more is needed to make any concrete conclusion.

=== Kepler-138d ===
Candidate planet Kepler-138d is very similar to K2-3B. It is also orbiting an M type star but has a longer orbital period of around 23.1 Earth days. The Kepler-138 system consists of three other exoplanets, none of which, including Kepler-138d, are within the habitable zone of their star. Similar to exoplanet K2-3b, its atmosphere may be retained enough to keep heat and allow liquid water to exist and is also possibly an eyeball planet. Kepler-138d is considered a Super Earth with a radius 1.5 times Earth’s and a mass 2.1 times Earth's. The density is not agreed upon and has been measured to be anywhere from 1.31 to 3.61g/cm^{3}. Despite the disagreement, these numbers still make Kepler-138d less dense than earth with 5.5g/cm^{3}, making it a potential Hycean world.

=== LTT 1445 A b ===
The potential hycean world LTT 1445 A b was discovered and confirmed by Transiting Exoplanet Survey Satellite using the transit method and the radial velocity method. It is orbiting a M type star and is not believed to be within the habitable zone because of its orbital period of 5.4 Earth days. Similar to other hycean planets outside of the habitable zone, LTT 1445 A b’s atmosphere may regulate its heat through the greenhouse effect and may still be considered habitable. It too may be an eyeball planet. LTT 1445 A b is considered to be a super earth with a radius 1.34 times Earth's and a mass 3.27 times Earth’s. LTT 1445 A b’s density is estimated to be anywhere from 4.4 to 7.1 g/cm^{3}. Earth’s density is 5.5g/cm^{3} and a rocky planet, meaning that LTT 1445 A b may be more dense than Earth meaning it may not have as much water as previously thought.

=== Other candidates ===
- K2-3c but may be too hot.
- TOI-732 c but may be too hot.
- TOI-1266 c but may be too hot.
- TOI-175 d but may be too hot.
- TOI-2136 b
- TOI-270 c, a potential Dark hycean planet but may be too hot.
- TOI-270 d but may be too hot.
- TOI-776 b, a potential Dark hycean planet but may be too hot.
- TOI-776 c but may be too hot.

== See also ==
- Hot Neptune
- Exoplanet
- Ocean world
- Mini Neptune
- Gas giant
