= TOI-2136 b =

Exoplanet in TOI-2136 star system

Discovery
- Discovered by: Tianjun Gan et al. (2022)
- Discovery site: TESS
- Discovery date: 2022
- Detection method: Radial velocity

Orbital characteristics
- Star: TOI-2136

Physical characteristics
- Mean radius: 2.19±0.17
- Mass: 6.37+2.45 −2.29

TOI-2136 b is a sub-Neptune exoplanet orbiting the nearby red dwarf star TOI-2136. It was discovered in 2022 through transit observations by NASA's TESS and independently validated using ground-based photometry and radial velocity measurements. The planet has an orbital period of approximately 7.85 days and lies at a distance of about 108 light-years from Earth. TOI-2136 b is known for its position near the red dwarf for planets predicted by atmospheric mass-loss models and for its potential as a hycean world.

== Discovery ==
TOI-2136 b was first identified as the candidate TOI-2136.01 from photometric data collected during TESS's primary mission. The transit signal was detected with an orbital period of 7.85 days around the red dwarf star TOI-2136.

Independent confirmation came from Gan et al. (2022) who used ground-based multi-wavelength photometry, high-angular-resolution imaging, and precise radial-velocity measurements from the CFHT/SPIRou instrument to validate the planet and measure its mass. Kawauchi et al. (2022) validated it using TESS data, ground-based photometry, and radial velocities from the Subaru Telescope's IRD instrument, while also conducting a search for helium in its atmosphere and Beard et al. (2022) provided additional validation using the Habitable-Zone Planet Finder (HPF) on the Hobby-Eberly Telescope, placing an upper mass limit.

== Characteristics ==
The mass–radius combination of TOI-2136 b is compatible with a wide range of interior compositions, from water or ice dominated worlds to gas-enveloped rocky cores. Interior structure models suggest it may retain a small H/He envelope (mass fraction ~1–2%) atop a rocky or icy core. It lies relatively close to the red dwarfs, where thermally driven atmospheric escape is expected to sculpt planetary populations.

TOI-2136 b has also been discussed as a potential Cold Haber World, where microbial life could produce detectable ammonia via a process similar to the Haber process under high-pressure ocean conditions and could be a future target for JWST.

== See also ==
- Sub-Neptune
- Hycean planet
- Red dwarf
- Transiting Exoplanet Survey Satellite
- List of exoplanets discovered in 2022
