= Titanium oxide =

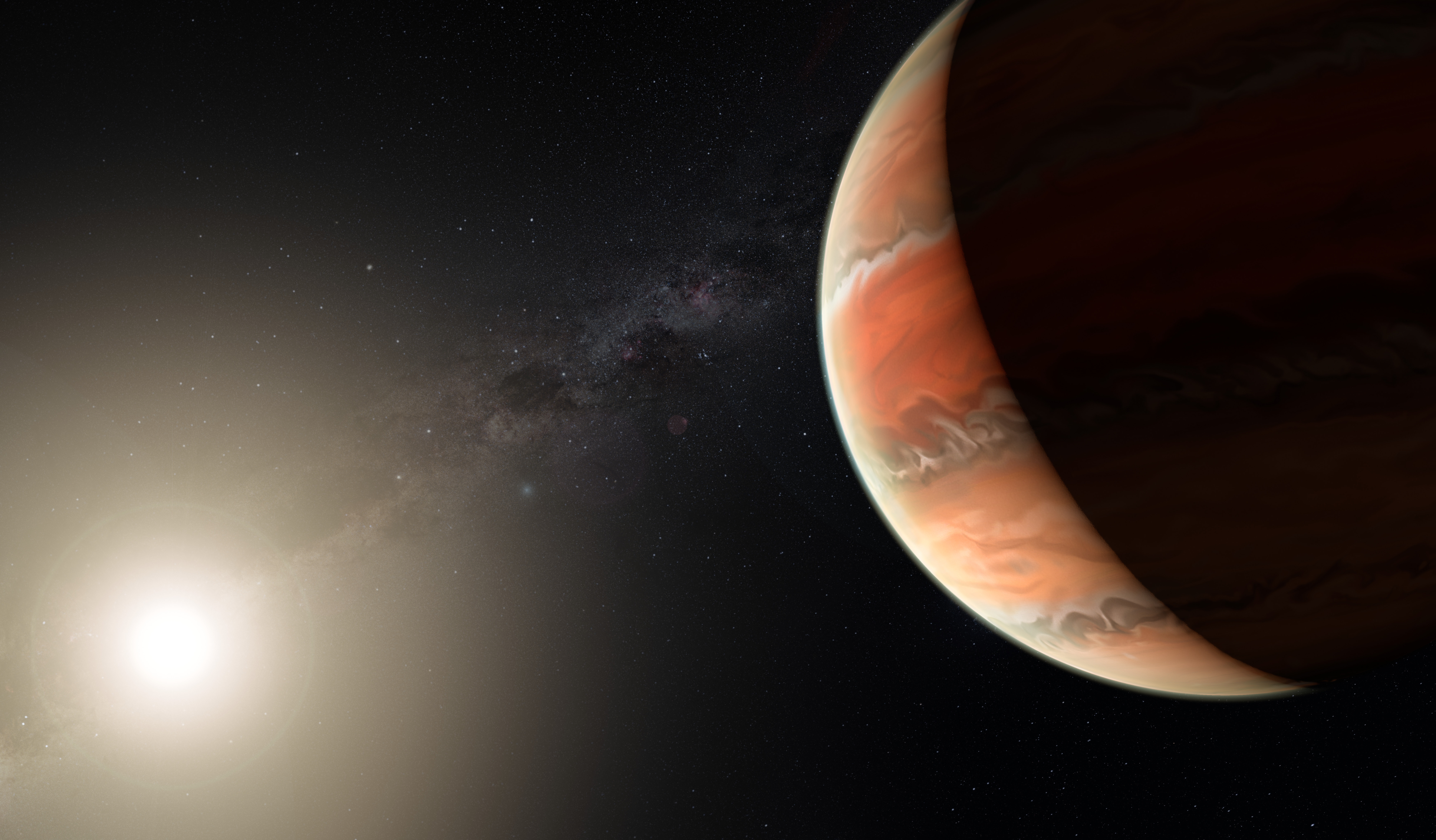
Artist's impression of the exoplanet WASP-19b, in which atmosphere astronomers, including Nikku Madhusudhan, detected titanium oxide.

Titanium oxide may refer to:

- Titanium dioxide (titanium(IV) oxide), TiO_{2}
- Titanium(II) oxide (titanium monoxide), TiO, a non-stoichiometric oxide
- Titanium(III) oxide (dititanium trioxide), Ti_{2}O_{3}
- Ti_{3}O
- Ti_{2}O
- δ-TiO_{x} (x= 0.68–0.75)
- Ti_{n}O_{2n−1} where n ranges from 3–9 inclusive, e.g. Ti_{3}O_{5}, Ti_{4}O_{7}, etc.

== Reduced titanium oxides ==
A common reduced titanium oxide is TiO, also known as titanium monoxide. It can be prepared from titanium dioxide and titanium metal at 1500 °C.

Ti_{3}O_{5}, Ti_{4}O_{7}, and Ti_{5}O_{9} are non-stoichiometric oxides. These compounds are typically formed at high temperatures in the presence of excess oxygen. As a result, they exhibit unique structural and electronic properties, and have been studied for their potential use in various applications, including in gas sensors, lithium-ion batteries, and photocatalysis.
