= K2-18b =

Sub-Neptune orbiting the red dwarf K2-18

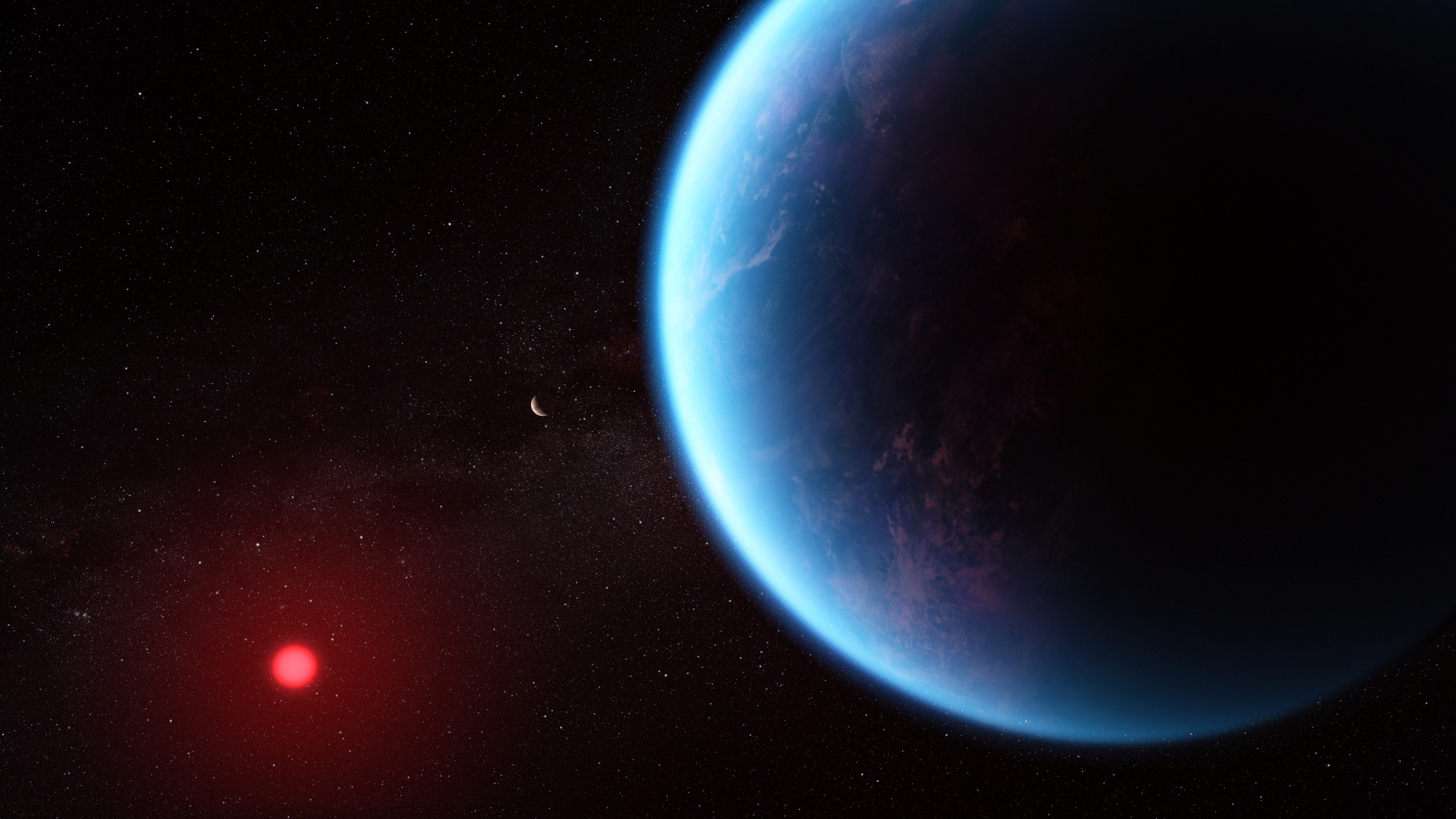
- Artist's impression of K2-18b (right) orbiting red dwarf K2-18 (left); the small crescent in the middle is K2-18c in planetary phase

Discovery
- Discovery site: Kepler space telescope
- Discovery date: 2015
- Detection method: Transit

Orbital characteristics
- Semi-major axis: 0.15910+0.00046 −0.00047 au 21,380,000 km
- Eccentricity: 0.09+0.12 −0.09
- Orbital period (sidereal): 32.940045±0.000100 d
- Argument of periastron: 354.3+46.4 −33.8°
- Star: K2-18

Physical characteristics
- Mean radius: 2.610±0.087 R_{🜨}
- Mass: 8.63±1.35 M_{🜨}
- Mean density: 2.67+0.52 −0.47 g/cm^{3}
- Surface gravity: 12.43+2.17 −2.07 m/s^{2}
- Temperature: 265 ± 5 K (−8 ± 5 °C)

K2-18b, also known as EPIC 20191255 b, is an exoplanet orbiting the red dwarf K2-18, located 124 light-years (38 pc) away from Earth. The planet is a sub-Neptune about 2.6 times the radius of Earth, with a 33-day orbit within the star's habitable zone; it receives approximately a similar amount of light as the Earth receives from the Sun. Initially discovered with the Kepler space telescope, it was later observed by the James Webb Space Telescope (JWST) in order to study the planet's atmosphere.

JWST discovered water vapour, carbon dioxide and methane in its atmosphere. JWST's data has been variously interpreted as indicating a water ocean planet with a hydrogen-rich atmosphere, and a gas-rich mini-Neptune. K2-18b has been studied as a potential habitable world that, temperature aside, more closely resembles an ice giant like Uranus or Neptune than Earth. It is the prototype for hycean planets, planets which have abundant water under a hydrogen envelope.

A controversial discovery of dimethyl sulfide (DMS) was reported in 2025, a chemical that could serve as a biosignature on exoplanets. It has not been widely accepted as proof of extraterrestrial life, however, as its presence could be explained by abiotic chemical processes and there are doubts that the observations actually show the presence of DMS instead of other compounds or measurement artifacts.

== Host star ==
K2-18 is an M dwarf of the spectral class M3V in the constellation Leo, 38.025 ± 0.079 parsecs (124.02 ± 0.26 ly) distant. The star is colder and smaller than the Sun, having a temperature of 3,457 K (3,184 °C; 5,763 °F) and a radius 45% of the Sun's, and is not visible to the naked eye from the Earth. The star is 2.4 ± 0.6 billion years old and displays moderate stellar activity, but whether it has starspots, which would tend to create false signals (Note: Observations of transiting planets rely on comparing the appearance of the planet with the appearance of the star's surface that is not covered with the planet, so variations in the star's appearance can be confused with the effects of the planet.) when a planet crosses them, is unclear. K2-18 has an additional planet inside of K2-18b's orbit, K2-18c, which may interact with K2-18b through tides. (Note: Tidal interactions are mutual interactions, mediated by gravity, between astronomical bodies that are in motion with respect of each other.)

It is estimated that up to 80% of all M dwarf stars have planets in their habitable zones, including the stars LHS 1140, Proxima Centauri and TRAPPIST-1. The small mass, size and low temperatures of these stars and frequent orbits of the planets make it easier to characterize the planets. On the other hand, the low luminosity of the stars can make spectroscopic analysis of planets difficult, and the stars are frequently active with flares and inhomogeneous stellar surfaces (faculae and starspots), which can produce erroneous spectral signals when investigating a planet.

== Physical properties ==
K2-18b has a radius of 2.610±0.087 R_{🜨}, a mass of 8.63±1.35 M_{🜨}, and orbits its star in 33 days. From Earth, it can be seen passing in front of the star. The planet is most likely tidally locked to the star, although considering its orbital eccentricity, a spin-orbit resonance like Mercury is also possible.

The density of K2-18b is about 2.67+0.52
−0.47 g/cm^{3}—intermediate between that of Earth and Neptune—implying that the planet has a hydrogen-rich envelope. (Note: An envelope is an atmosphere that originated together with the planet itself from a protoplanetary disk. In gas giants, atmospheres make up the bulk of the planet's mass.) The planet may either be rocky with a thick envelope or have a Neptune-like composition. (Note: A Neptune-like composition implies that apart from water and rock the planet contains substantial amounts of hydrogen and helium.) A pure water planet with a thin atmosphere is less likely. Planets with radii of about 1.5–2 R_{🜨} are unexpectedly rare relative to their expected occurrence rate, a phenomenon known as the radius valley. Presumably, planets with intermediary radii cannot hold their atmospheres against the tendency of their own energy output and the stellar radiation to drive atmospheric escape. (Planets with even smaller radii are known as super-Earths and those with larger radii as sub-Neptunes.)

The planet may have taken a few million years to form. Significant tidal heating is unlikely. Internal heating may increase temperatures at large depths, but is unlikely to significantly affect the surface temperature. If an ocean exists, it is probably underlain by a high-pressure ice layer on top of a rocky core, which might destabilize the planet's climate by preventing material flows between the core and the ocean. The existence of exomoons, which could affect the climate and habitability of K2-18b, has been examined. It appears that the Hill sphere where a moon can be held by the planet is too small to allow a moon's lifespan to exceed 10 million years. It is not clear whether planets like K2-18b can host exomoons; it is possible that tidal effects or orbital interactions would destroy them.

=== Possible ocean ===
At temperatures exceeding the critical point, liquids and gases stop being different phases and there is no longer a separation between an ocean and the atmosphere. It is unclear whether observations imply that a separate liquid ocean exists on K2-18b, and detecting such an ocean is difficult from the outside; its existence cannot be inferred or ruled out solely from the mass and radius of a planet.

The existence of a liquid water ocean is uncertain. Before the James Webb Space Telescope observations, a supercritical state of the water was believed to be more likely. JWST observations were initially considered to be more consistent with a fluid-gas interface and thus a liquid ocean—trace gases such as hydrocarbons and ammonia can be lost from an atmosphere to an ocean if it exists; their presence may thus imply the absence of an ocean-atmosphere separation. Subsequent work finds that a magma ocean may also be capable of dissolving ammonia and explaining the observation results, but not to explain the observed carbon oxide concentrations. Whether the carbon oxide concentrations can be explained by a mini-Neptune/deep hydrogen atmosphere model is uncertain. Another paper suggests that a liquid water ocean model requires the presence of a biosphere in order to produce sufficient amount of methane.

== Atmosphere and climate ==
Observations with the Hubble Space Telescope have found that K2-18b has an atmosphere consisting of hydrogen with high metallicity. The presence of water vapour is likely (Note: Initially there were questions about whether the water vapour was actually methane.) but with uncertainty, as James Webb Space Telescope observations indicating concentrations of less than 0.1%; this may be due to the JWST seeing a dry stratosphere as the atmosphere is thought to have an efficient cold trap. Ammonia concentrations appear to be unmeasurably low, (Note: The lack of ammonia and methane in Neptune-like exoplanet atmospheres is known as the "missing methane problem", and is an unresolved mystery as of 2021. The unusually low ammonia and methane concentrations could be due to life, photochemical processes, the freezing-out of methane) or due to issues with measurements. JWST observations indicate that methane and carbon dioxide each make up about 1% of the atmosphere although later observations cast some doubt on the presence of carbon dioxide. Other carbon oxides were not reported; only an upper limit to their concentrations (a few percent) has been established. The atmosphere makes up at most 6.2% of the planet's mass, and its composition probably resembles that of Uranus and Neptune.

Whether there are hazes in K2-18b's atmosphere is unclear, while evidence for water clouds, the only kind of clouds likely to form at K2-18b, is conflicting. If they exist, the clouds are most likely icy but liquid water is possible. Apart from water, ammonium chloride, sodium sulfide, potassium chloride and zinc sulfide could form clouds in the atmosphere of K2-18b, depending on the planet's properties. Most computer models expect that a temperature inversion will form at high elevation, yielding a stratosphere.

=== Evolution ===
High-energy radiation from the star, such as hard (Note: Hard UV radiation means UV radiation with short wavelengths; shorter wavelengths imply a higher frequency and higher energy per photon.) UV radiation and X-rays, is expected to heat the upper atmosphere and fill it with hydrogen formed through the photodissociation of water, thus forming an extended hydrogen-rich exosphere that can escape from the planet. The X-ray and UV fluxes that K2-18b receives from K2-18 are considerably higher than the equivalent fluxes from the Sun; the hard UV radiation flux provides enough energy to drive this exosphere to escape at a rate of about 350+400
−290 tons per second, too slow to remove the planet's atmosphere during its lifespan. Observations of decreases of Lyman alpha radiation emissions during transits of the planet may show the presence of such an exosphere, though this discovery requires confirmation.

=== Alternative scenarios ===
Detecting atmospheres around planets is difficult, and several reported findings are controversial. Barclay et al. (2021) suggested that the water vapour signal may be due to stellar activity, rather than water in K2-18b's atmosphere. Bézard et al. (2020) proposed that methane may be a more significant component, making up about 3–10% while water may constitute about 5–11% of the atmosphere, and Bézard, Charnay and Blain (2022) proposed that the evidence of water is actually due to methane, although such a scenario is less probable.

=== Models ===
Climate models have been used to simulate the climate that K2-18b might have, and an intercomparison of their results for K2-18b is part of the CAMEMBERT project to simulate the climates of sub-Neptune planets. Among the climate modelling efforts made on K2-18b are:

- Charnay et al. (2021), assuming that the planet is tidally locked, found an atmosphere with weak temperature gradients and a wind system with descending air on the night side and ascending air on the day side. In the upper atmosphere, radiation absorption by methane produced an inversion layer. Clouds could only form if the atmosphere had a high metallicity; their properties strongly depended on the size of cloud particles and the composition and circulation of the atmosphere. They formed mainly at the substellar point and terminator. If there was rainfall, it could not reach the surface; instead it evaporated to form virga. Simulations with a spin-orbit resonance did not substantially alter the cloud distribution. They also simulated the appearance of the atmosphere during stellar transits.
- Innes and Pierrehumbert (2022) conducted simulations assuming different rotation rates and concluded that, except for high rotation rates, there is not a substantial temperature gradient between poles and equator. They found the existence of jet streams above the equator and at high latitudes, with weaker equatorial jets at the surface.
- Hu (2021) conducted simulations of the planet's chemistry. They concluded that the photochemistry should not be able to completely remove ammonia from the outer atmosphere and that carbon oxides and cyanide would form in the middle atmosphere, where they could be detectable. The model predicts that a sulfur haze layer could form, extending through and above the water clouds. Such a haze layer would make investigations of the planet's atmosphere much more difficult.
- Tsai et al. (2024) ran chemical and physical models. They found a prograde jet stream in the troposphere and a retrograde one above 0.0001-bar altitude, with thermally driven circulation inbetween the two. Tentative detection of dimethyl sulfide was reported. Several hydrocarbons can mask the dimethyl sulfide signal, and its production needs to exceed Earth's by a factor of 20 to be detectable. Such a rate is possible for a plausible ecosystem.
- Radecka and Rimmer (2025) ran chemical models to determine whether K2-18b would be expected to have nitrogen compounds in its atmosphere. They concluded that nitrogen compounds would be so rare as to be hard to detect, and the production of hydrogen cyanide is considered insufficient to produce organic compounds required for abiogenesis.
- Howard et al. (2025) proposed that water and hydrogen had become unmixed in K2-18b's interior, which may explain why JWST did not find water in its atmosphere.

== Habitability ==
Incoming stellar radiation amounts to 1,368+114
−107 W/m^{2}, similar to the average insolation Earth receives. K2-18b is located within or just slightly inside the habitable zone of its star; it may be close to, but fall short of, the runaway greenhouse threshold—and its temperature in the absence of a greenhouse is about 250 K (−23 °C; −10 °F) to 300 K (27 °C; 80 °F). Whether the planet is actually habitable depends on the nature of the atmosphere and the albedo of clouds and hazes; the deeper layers of the atmosphere may be too hot, while the water-containing layers might or might not have temperatures and pressures suitable for the development of life. The few data on the albedo might indicate it is sufficient.

Microorganisms from Earth can survive in hydrogen-rich atmospheres, illustrating that hydrogen is no impediment to life. However, a number of biosignature gases used to identify the presence of life are not reliable indicators when found in a hydrogen-rich atmosphere, thus different markers would be needed to identify biological activity at K2-18b. According to Madhusudhan et al., several of these markers could be detected by the James Webb Space Telescope after a reasonable number of observations.

== Discovery and research history ==
The planet was discovered in 2015 by the Kepler space telescope, and its existence was later confirmed with the Spitzer Space Telescope and through Doppler velocity techniques. Analyses of the transits ruled out that they were caused by unseen companion stars, by multiple planets or systematic errors of the observations. Early estimates of the star's radius had substantial errors, which led to incorrect planet radius estimates and the density of the planet being overestimated. The discovery of the spectroscopic signature of water vapour on K2-18b in 2019 was the first discovery of water vapour on an exoplanet that is not a hot Jupiter and drew a lot of discussion.

K2-18b has been used as a test case for exoplanet studies. The properties of K2-18b have led to the definition of a hycean planet, a type of planet that has both abundant liquid water and a hydrogen envelope. Planets with such compositions were previously thought to be too hot to be habitable; findings at K2-18b instead suggest that they might be cold enough to harbour liquid water oceans conducive to life. The strong greenhouse effect of the hydrogen envelope might allow them to remain habitable even at low instellation rates. K2-18b is probably the best-known hycean planet. Other, non-hycean compositions are possible, both habitable and uninhabitable.

=== Presence or absence of biosignatures ===
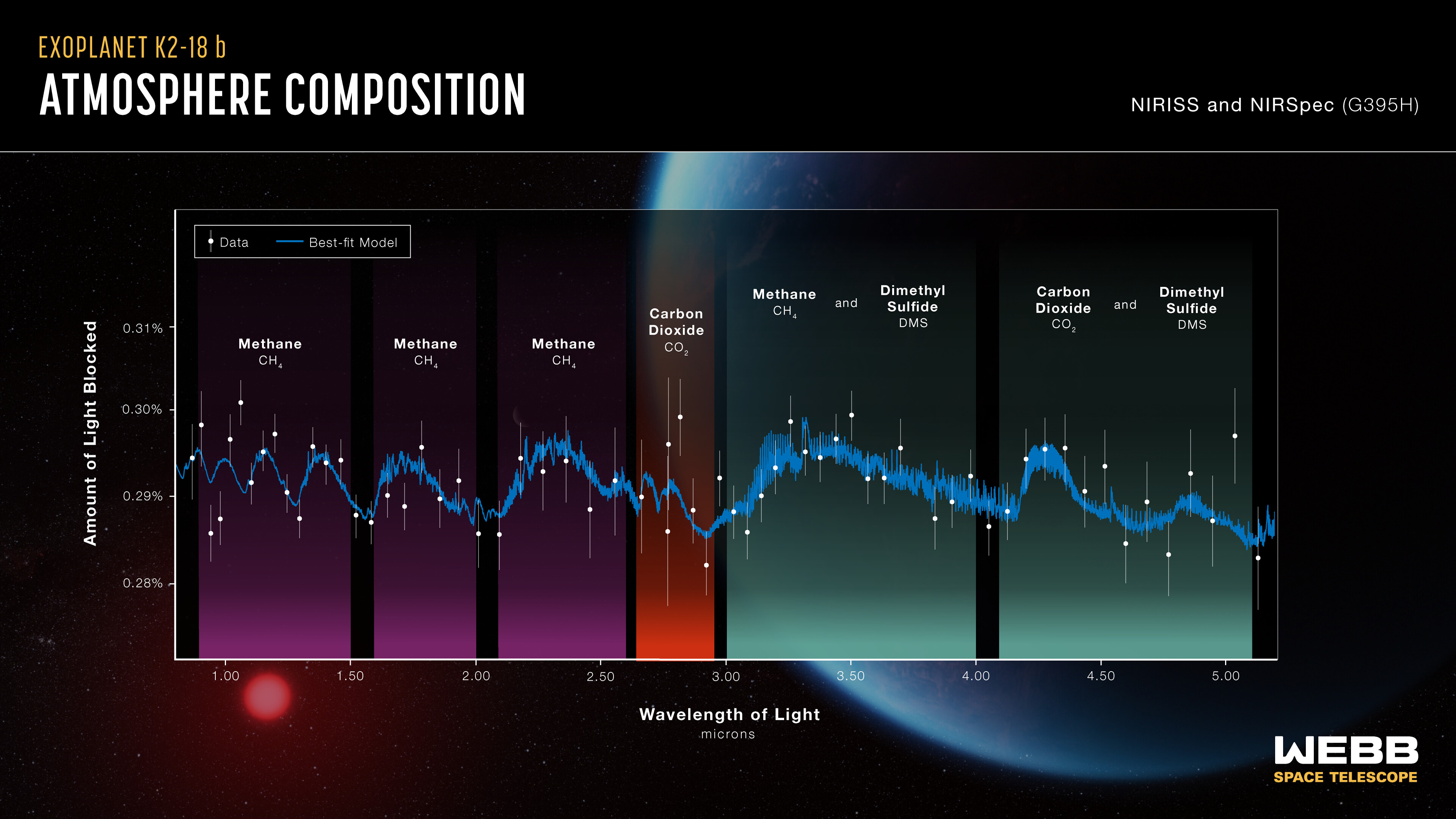
The near-infrared transmission spectrum of K2-18b, as measured by the James Webb Space Telescope's NIRSpec instrument in 2023. Credit: NASA, CSA, ESA, J. Olmstead, N. Madhusudhan 2023

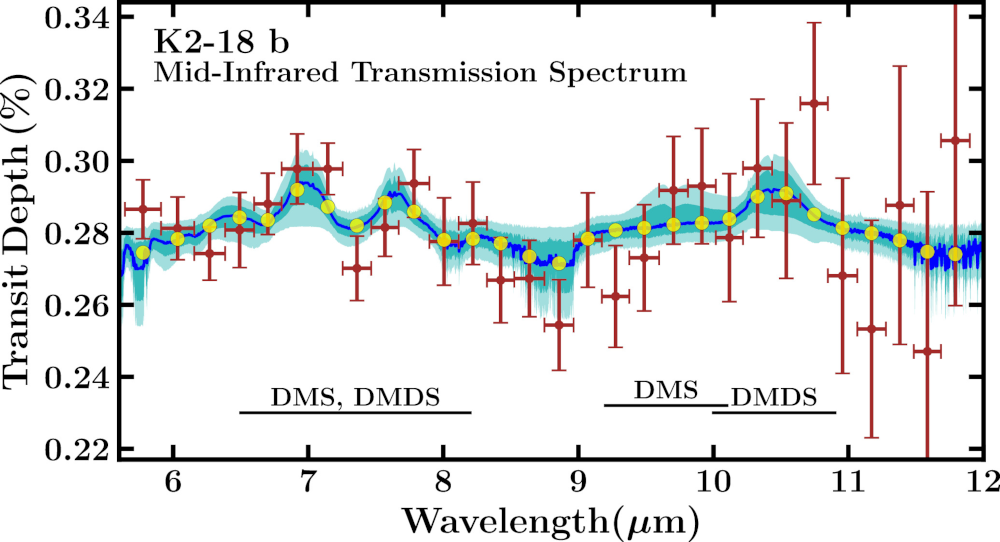
The mid-infrared transmission spectrum of K2-18b taken by JWST's Mid-Infrared Instrument. Credit: Madhusudhan et al. 2025

There is some evidence of dimethyl sulfide (DMS) (Note: The presence of DMS is a potential biosignature, as the bulk of the DMS in Earth's atmosphere is emitted from phytoplankton in marine environments.) and methyl chloride being present in the atmosphere. However, there is disagreement about whether the data from the various surveys can in fact be interpreted as proof that there is DMS in K2-18b's atmosphere:

- A key concern is whether the transit data by JWST require the presence of DMS or are still consistent with a "flat line" spectrum. Several follow-up studies found that the DMS signature might actually be the product of other molecules or just a flat line. Processing the same data in different ways can yield different outputs, some implying the presence of DMS and others not. The statistical significance of the observation is also small.
- Dimethyl sulfide (along with similar molecules) can be produced through photochemical processes without the need for life. The DMS concentrations reported (if they are correct) might be too high to be produced abiotically, but even biotic DMS would require a very high production rate.
- The high methane concentrations might indicate the presence of methanogenic life, but abiotic scenarios like methane formation through atmospheric chemistry or upwards mixing of gases from the deep interior (if the planet is too hot for life) are also possible.
- The absence of ethane was cited by Tsai et al. 2024 as an argument against the DMS being of biological origin, as biological processes producing the DMS in the quantities required would be expected to produce detectable quantities of ethane.
- Aside from the discussion of specific biosignature gases, some modelling efforts have shown that the presence of life explains several observational traits better than a pure hycean or mini-Neptune model when making assumptions about K2-18b's metallicity.

Claims of discoveries of extraterrestrial life have a long history of being contentious or disproven. Finding life outside of Earth is difficult and no such claim has as of 2025 been widely accepted by the scientific community, and neither was the claim about K2-18b. Global news media reports and press releases of publications about K2-18b's possible biosignatures have often been much more definitively stated than the often carefully qualified papers they rely on. Aside from research on whether K2-18b is actually inhabited, there have been studies discussing whether life or compounds required by life like amino acids could actually form on K2-18b. The discussion about K2-18b has drawn attention to the issue of how to establish confidence of having detected a chemical signature, the limitations of spectral databases and observation techniques that are not specifically designed for detecting chemical signatures in exoplanets, and the potential benefit of a scientific body that assesses whether a scientific consensus exists on specific questions.

== See also ==
- Extraterrestrial liquid water – Liquid water naturally occurring outside Earth
- Habitability of natural satellites – Measure of the potential of natural satellites to have environments hospitable to life
- Habitability of red dwarf systems – Possible factors for life around red dwarf stars
- List of potentially habitable exoplanets
- Planetary habitability – Known extent to which a planet is suitable for life
- List of exoplanets discovered in 2015, including K2-18b
