= L 98-59 =

Red dwarf star in the constellation Volans

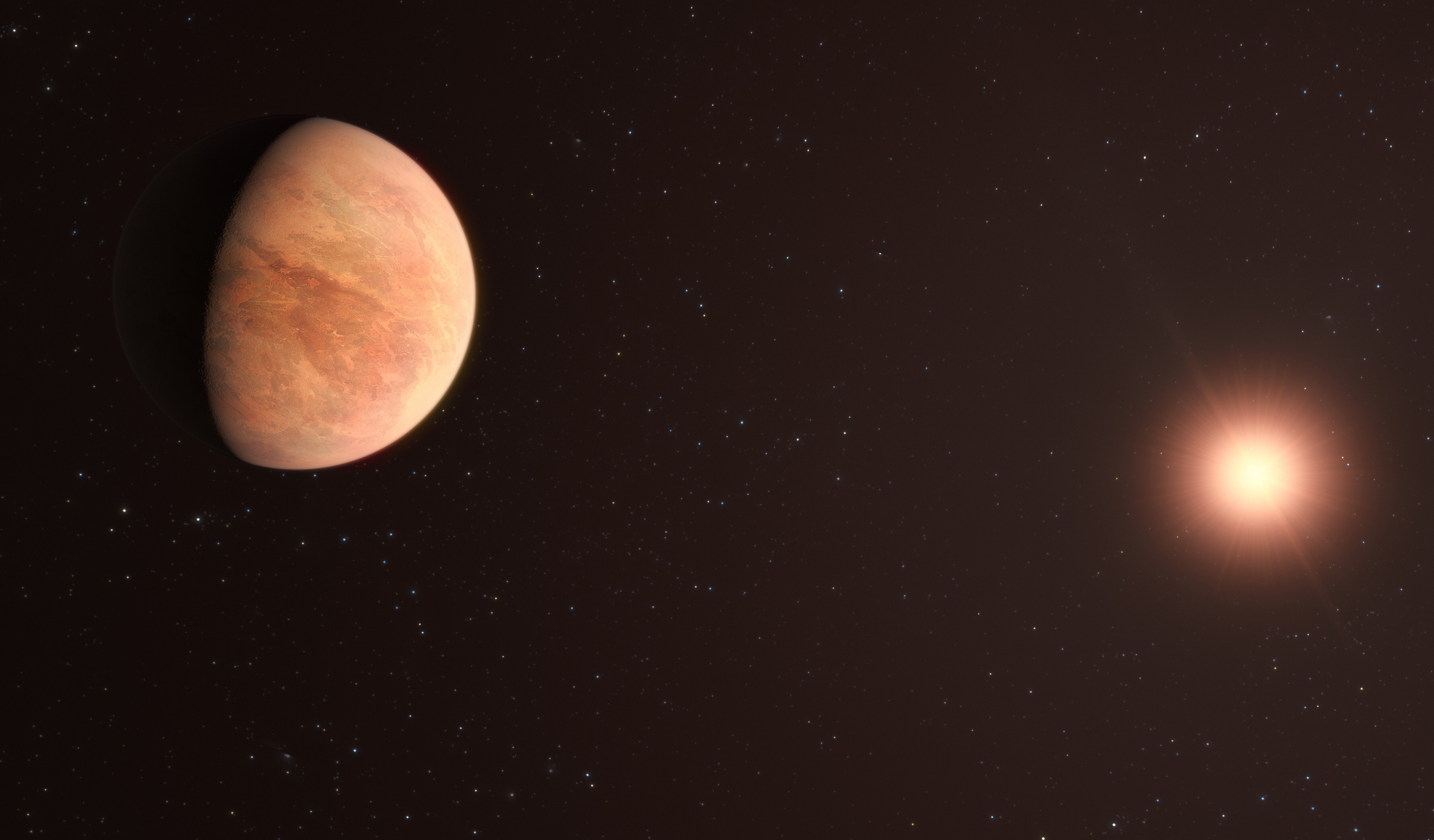
- Artist's impressions of the L 98-59 system

Observation data Epoch J2000 Equinox ICRS
- Constellation: Volans
- Right ascension: 08^{h} 18^{m} 07.62144^{s}
- Declination: −68° 18′ 46.8054″
- Apparent magnitude (V): 11.69±0.05

Characteristics
- Evolutionary stage: Main sequence
- Spectral type: M3V
- B−V colour index: +1.53
- R−I colour index: +1.28
- Variable type: None

Astrometry
Radial velocity (R_{v})	−6.10±0.19 km/s
Proper motion (μ)	RA: 94.794(18) mas/yr Dec.: −340.084(20) mas/yr
Parallax (π)	94.2664±0.0155 mas
Distance	34.599 ± 0.006 ly (10.608 ± 0.002 pc)

Details
Mass	0.2923±0.0067 M_{☉}
Radius	0.3155±0.0062 R_{☉}
Luminosity (bolometric)	0.0122±0.0010 L_{☉}
Habitable zone inner limit	0.090 au
Habitable zone outer limit	0.237 au
Surface gravity (log g)	4.91±0.02 cgs
Temperature	3,415±60 K
Metallicity [Fe/H]	−0.46±0.26 dex
Rotation	76.7±1.5 days
Age	4.94±1.44 Gyr

Other designations
- L 98-59, NLTT 19357, TOI-175, TIC 307210830, TYC 9193-2365-1, 2MASS J08180763-6818468

Database references
SIMBAD	data
Exoplanet Archive	data

The system as illustrated by NASA. Note that the illustration was created before the discoveries of planet e and f.

L 98-59 (TOI-175, TIC 307210830) is a red dwarf star located in the constellation of Volans, at a distance of 10.608 parsecs (34.60 light-years), as measured by the Gaia spacecraft.

Broadband photometry shows that it is an M dwarf star, redder, smaller and fainter than the Sun. It has three confirmed terrestrial-size planets in transit, which were announced in 2019 by the Transiting Exoplanet Survey Satellite (TESS), as well as two additional non-transiting planets, for a total of five known planets. The outermost planet is in the habitable zone.

== Planetary system ==
The planets L 98-59 b, c, and d were discovered in 2019 by TESS. The non-transiting potential super-Venus planet L 98-59 e was discovered in 2021, along with indications of the presence of L 98-59 f, another non-transiting super-Earth located in the system's habitable zone. In 2025, the planet f was confirmed, and an additional planet candidate orbiting interior to planet b was detected.

The two innermost confirmed planets, L 98-59 b and c, as well as L 98-59 e are possibly hot rocky planets. L 98-59 d has a low density, around 2.2 g/cm^{3} versus 5.5 g/cm^{3} for Earth, indicating large amounts of volatiles.

=== Atmosphere characterization ===
In September 2021, suggested tests of the abilities of the Hubble Space Telescope and the James Webb Space Telescope (JWST) to detect and describe the atmospheric features of the three inner planets were reported. In 2022, Hubble observations of three transiting planets found with no clear evidence of atmospheres, with high mean molecular weight atmospheres, cloudy or hazy atmospheres, or no atmospheres all being consistent with the observed flat spectra. However, the JWST did find evidence of sulfur dioxide, hydrogen, and hydrogen sulfide for planets b and d, suggesting that both are sulfur-rich volcanic worlds with strong tidal heating, and may contain a global internal magma ocean. A 2026 study was able to confirm the presence of hydrogen sulfide for planet d using ground-based telescope.

The L 98-59 planetary system
Companion (in order from star)	Mass	Semimajor axis (AU)	Orbital period (days)	Eccentricity	Inclination (°)	Radius
.06 (unconfirmed)	≥0.58±0.12 M_{🜨}	0.0188±0.0004	1.7361+0.0007 −0.0008	0.027+0.040 −0.020	—	—
b	0.46±0.11 M_{🜨}	0.0223±0.0007	2.2531140(4)	0.031+0.017 −0.016	88.08+0.23 −0.20	0.837±0.019 R_{🜨}
c	2.00±0.13 M_{🜨}	0.0309±0.0010	3.6906764(4)	0.002+0.002 −0.001	88.88+0.21 −0.17	1.329±0.029 R_{🜨}
d	1.64±0.07 M_{🜨}	0.0494±0.0016	7.450729(2)	0.006+0.007 −0.004	88.44±0.05	1.627±0.041 R_{🜨}
e	≥2.82±0.19 M_{🜨}	0.0712±0.0022	12.8278±0.0018	0.012+0.009 −0.008	80–88.82	—
f	≥2.8±0.3 M_{🜨}	0.1052±0.0033	23.064±0.055	0.044+0.027 −0.028	74–89.20	—

== Gallery ==
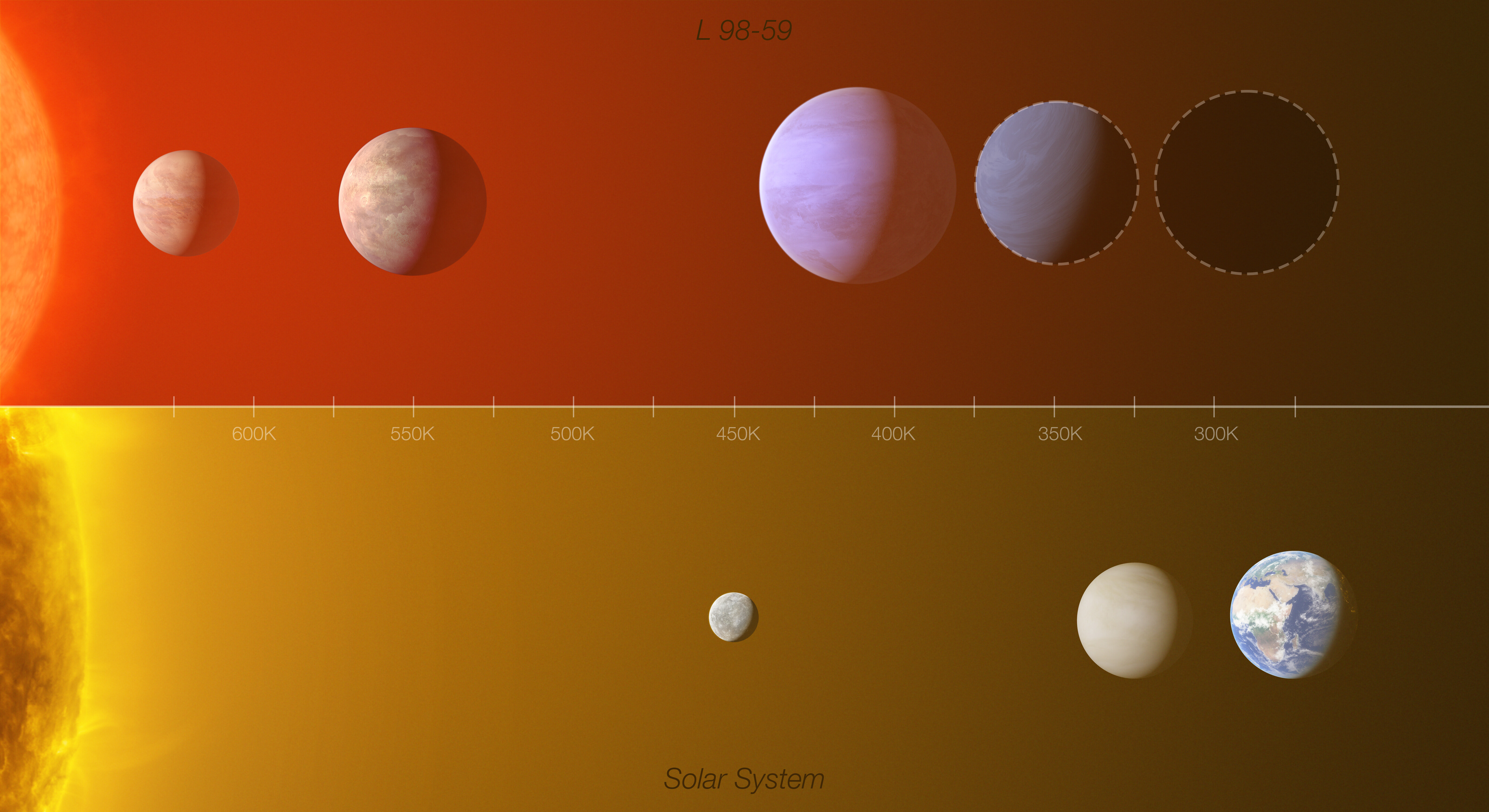
Artist's impression of the L 98-59 system, compared to the inner Solar System. Distances are not to scale.

== See also ==
- List of potentially habitable exoplanets
- List of exoplanets discovered in 2019
- TOI-700 d
