= L 98-59 d =

Exoplanet orbiting L 98-59

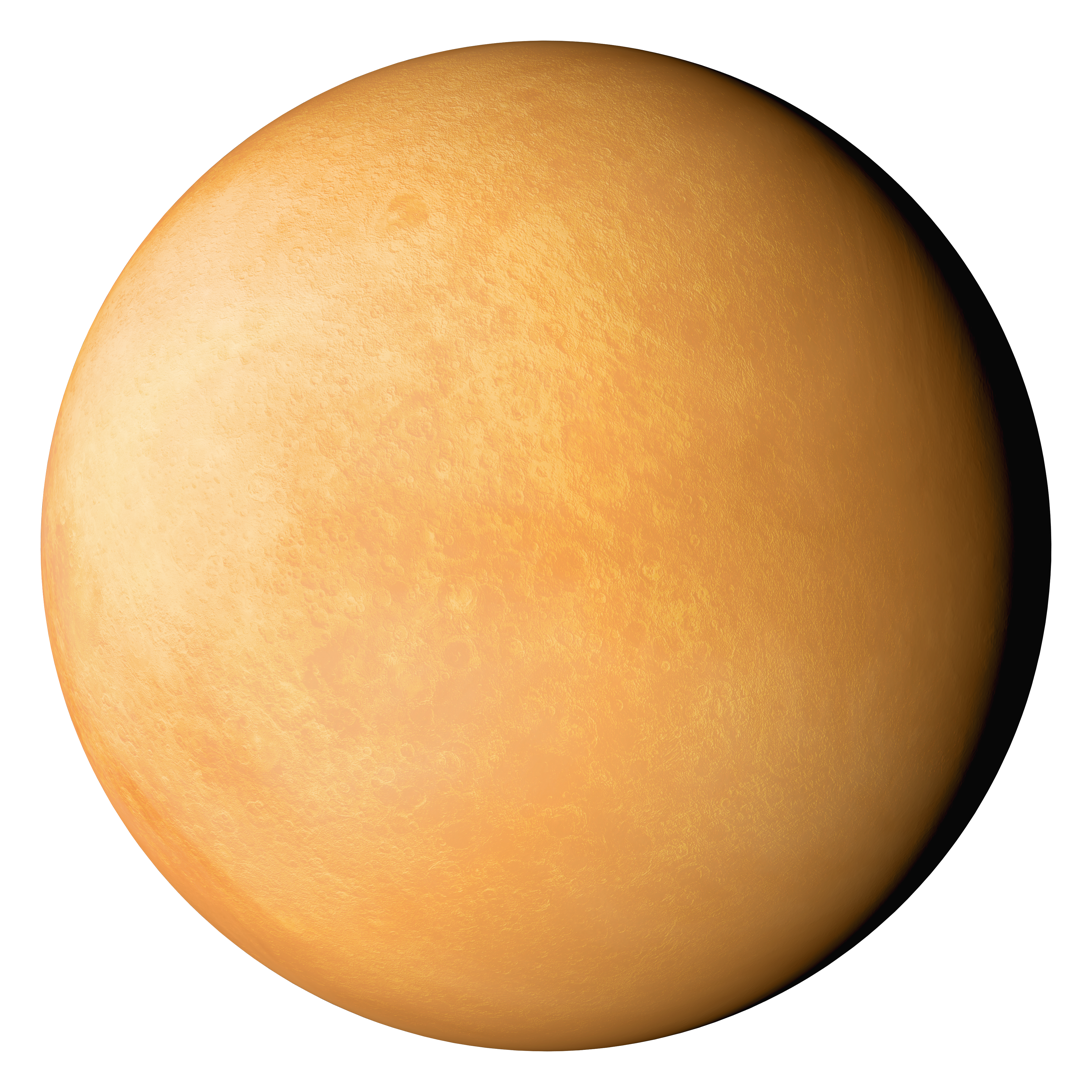
- Artist's impression of L 98-59 d.

Discovery
- Discovery date: March 2019
- Detection method: Transit

Orbital characteristics
- Semi-major axis: 0.0494±0.0016 AU
- Eccentricity: 0.006+0.007 −0.004
- Orbital period (sidereal): 7.450729 d
- Inclination: 88.44±0.05
- Star: L 98-59

Physical characteristics
- Mean radius: 1.627±0.041 R_{🜨}
- Mass: 1.64±0.07 M_{🜨}
- Mean density: 2.2 g/cm^{3}
- Temperature: 1,900 °C (3,450 °F)

L 98-59 d (TOI-175 d) is an exoplanet orbiting the star L 98-59 34.6 light years from Earth. L 98-59 d is the third, potentially fourth, planet in its system. Its discovery was announced along with L 98-59 b and c in 2019 by the Transiting Exoplanet Survey Satellite (TESS). L 98-59 d is a super-Earth having a mass of 1.64 M_{🜨} and has a radius of 1.627 R_{🜨}. It takes 7.450729 days to orbit L 98-59 and orbits at a distance of 4.94% Earth's orbit and has one of the least eccentric orbits in its system with an eccentricity of 0.006. The James Webb Space Telescope (JWST) observations of a planet found with an atmosphere made of hydrogen, hydrogen sulfide, and sulfur dioxide and also found a lava ocean on its surface.

== Atmosphere ==
In 2026, the JWST discovered a cloud-free atmosphere around L 98-59 d made of hydrogen, hydrogen sulfide and sulfur dioxide.

== Magma ocean ==
The same study that found an atmosphere around this planet found a molten surface made of lava with a temperature of 1900°C.

== Formation ==
L 98-59 d formed as a sub-Neptune about 5 billion years ago and its star stripped its atmosphere away. L 98-59 d has an abundance of hydrogen, hydrogen sulfide and sulfur dioxide and over time due to volcanic activity formed an atmosphere with the same elements. L 98-59 d has a core mass of 66% Earth's total mass. Its core is 55% of the radius of Earth. The planet L 98-59 d we see today is the dying remnant of a mini-Neptune in the process of losing its atmosphere and becoming airless.
