= Systemic (amateur extrasolar planet search project) =

Amateur astronomy exoplanet search tool

Systemic is a research project designed to search data for extrasolar planets using amateur astronomers. The project utilizes a downloaded console provided on the Systemic website, allowing users to sort through data sets in search of characteristics which may reveal the presence of a planet within a planetary system.

Volunteers can choose to search simulated or actual planetary systems. The simulations are used to help Systemic gain a deeper understanding of real extrasolar planets. The real Solar System and the Galilean moons of Jupiter's natural satellites (hidden among the "challenge" data sets) are among the more than 450 data sets of real, and 520 simulated, star systems.

The systemic program itself is programmed in Java for ease in running on multiple operating systems. The program is available as an online applet or for download to be run at home.

The program presents a data set for a system and some tools to help analyze the data and some feedback on the "goodness of fit" and "long term stability" of the currently defined system. The data set is the radial velocity derived from doppler measurements of the star (or similar object) over time. Some data sets look like a sinusoidal curve while others seem far more complex. Any radial velocity is presumed to be from the gravitational tug(s) of possibly multiple bodies who combine to create the specific data curve. The reason the program has to manipulated by the user is that the complexities of multi-body orbits are not solvable to unique answers. While some star systems could be resolved to a simple pair of bodies most will not. The systemic software implements several ways of calculating orbital mechanics – from the simplistic Keplerian laws to an implementation of Runge–Kutta methods.

Results one obtains can be uploaded and are analyzed independently for goodness of fit and stability and are posted among the proposed solutions for that system. If a result is found to be unstable it is removed from the list of candidate solutions, though it is possible a particular system really is in a period of transition and instability (presumed to be a rare condition) so great that planets would be ejected from the system.

== Example analysis ==
The default system the systemic software opens with is "14Her" or 14 Herculis. There are some 20 "unique" posted possible solutions with only a general idea of "goodness of fit" to help decide favored solutions (the best solution posted so far is by user EricFDiaz who has a three-planet system to explain the curve of the velocities of the star over time). It must be understood that results from using systemic are not a discovery, just a possible fit to the data. It could be correct, partially correct, or not even in the ballpark of whatever, if anything, is eventually found.

== Team ==
Systemic is designed, and run by:

- Greg Laughlin — University of California Santa Cruz
- Aaron Wolf — Caltech
- Stefano Meschiari — University of California Santa Cruz
- Eugenio Rivera — University of California Santa Cruz
- Paul Shankland — US Naval Observatory

== See also ==
- BOINC
- Einstein@Home
- Grid computing
- Ken Croswell
- List of volunteer computing projects
- Methods of detecting extrasolar planets
- Search for Extra-Terrestrial Intelligence
