= Nikku Madhusudhan =

Indian-British astronomer

- Education: IIT-BHU (BTech); MIT (MS, PhD)
- Awards: EAS MERAC Prize in Theoretical Astrophysics (2019).; IUPAP Young Scientist Medal in Astrophysics (2016); ASI Vainu Bappu Gold Medal (2014)
- Scientific career
- Fields: Exoplanets
- Institutions: Institute of Astronomy, Cambridge; MIT; Princeton University; Yale University
- Thesis: Retrieval of Atmospheric Properties of Extrasolar Planets (2009)
- Doctoral advisor: Sara Seager
- Website: people.ast.cam.ac.uk/~nmadhu/Nikku_Madhusudhan/Home.html

Nikku Madhusudhan is an Indian British astronomer and professor of astrophysics and Exoplanetary Science at the Institute of Astronomy, University of Cambridge. He is credited with developing an improved technique of atmospheric retrieval to infer the compositions of exoplanets, and with coining the term "hycean planet" to describe a theorised class of planet which hosts a liquid water ocean beneath a hydrogen-rich atmosphere.

== Biography ==
Madhusudhan obtained a B.Tech. at Indian Institute of Technology (BHU) Varanasi before pursuing a M.S. and Ph.D. at MIT. His doctoral advisor was Sara Seager.

During his PhD, Madhusudhan developed an improved method for atmospheric retrieval, the process of inferring the composition and temperature structure of exoplanet atmospheres from their observed spectra. In 2012, Madhusudhan showed that the mass and radius of the super-Earth 55 Cancri e was consistent with a carbon-rich interior. In 2014, he led a team which obtained high-precision measurements of the atmospheric water abundances of three hot Jupiters, finding less water than would be expected given planet formation models at the time.

In 2020, Madhusudhan led a team who studied the interior and atmosphere of the mini-Neptune exoplanet K2-18b. They found that in certain cases, liquid water may exist on the planet's surface, albeit at temperatures and pressures higher than STP.
