= L 98-59 b =

Terrestrial planet orbiting L 98-59

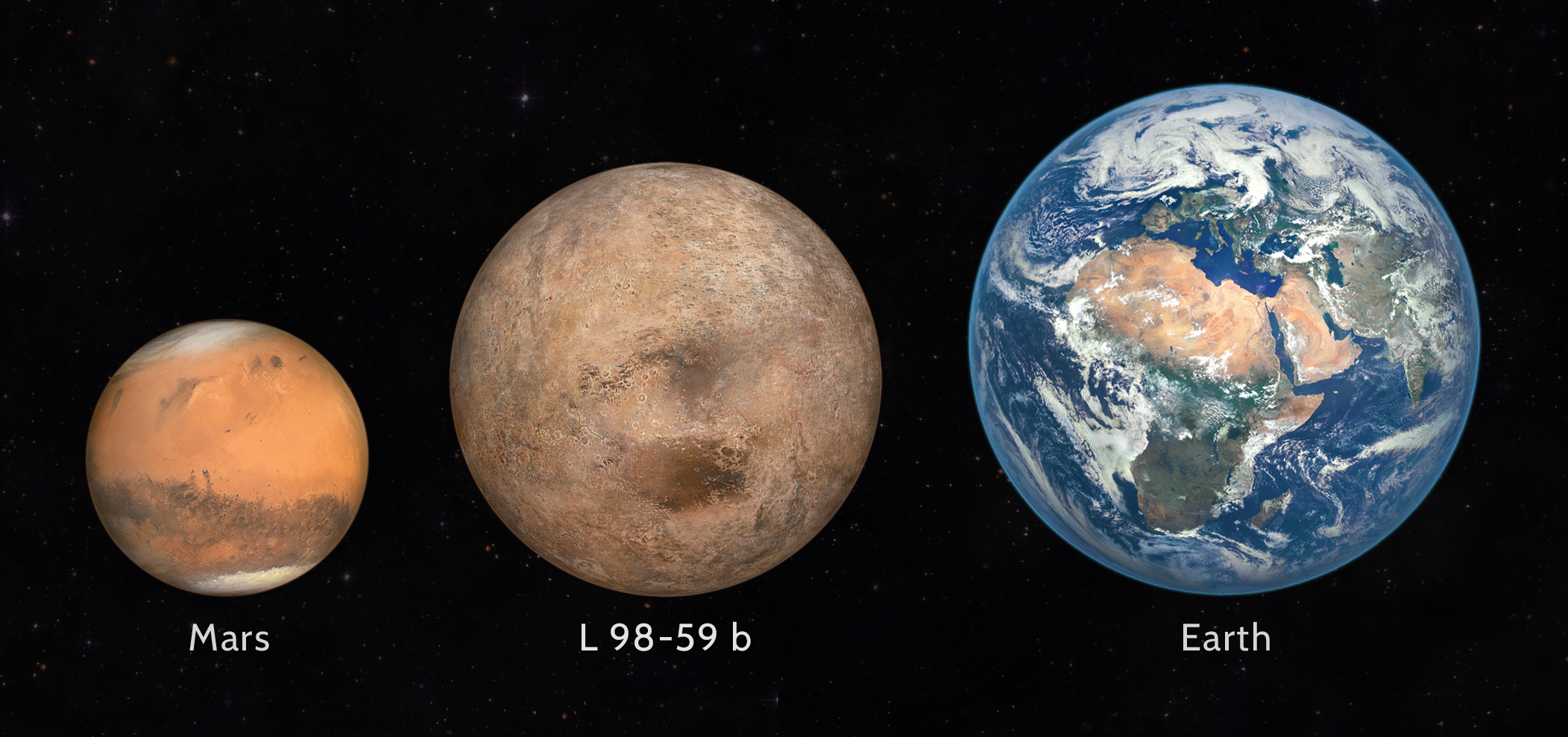
- Artist's impression and size comparison with Earth and Mars

Discovery
- Discovery date: March 2019
- Detection method: Transit

Orbital characteristics
- Semi-major axis: 0.02191+0.00080 −0.00084 AU
- Eccentricity: 0.103+0.117 −0.045
- Orbital period (sidereal): 2.2531136+0.0000012 −0.0000015 d
- Inclination: 87.71°+1.16° −0.44°
- Semi-amplitude: 0.56±0.16 m/s
- Star: L 98-59

Physical characteristics
- Mean radius: 0.850+0.061 −0.047 R_{🜨}
- Mass: 0.47+0.13 −0.15 M_{🜨}
- Mean density: 4.3+1.2 −1.9 g/cm^{3}
- Temperature: 627+33 −36 K (354 °C; 669 °F, equilibrium)

L 98-59 b is an exoplanet having a size between that of the Earth and Mars and a mass only half that of Venus. It orbits L 98-59, a red dwarf star 34.6 light-years away in the constellation Volans. There are at least 4 (possibly 5) other planets in the system: L 98-59 c, d, e, f and the unconfirmed ".06". Its discovery was announced on 27 June 2019 in The Astronomical Journal and in a NASA press release. It was the smallest planet discovered by TESS until the discovery of LHS 1678 b, and was the lowest-mass planet whose mass had been measured using radial velocities until Proxima Centauri d was found in 2022.

== Characteristics ==
L 98-59 b orbits its star in 2.25 days and stays so close to the star that it receives 22 times more energy than Earth receives from the Sun. There are 4 confirmed planets in the system but they are not in the habitable zone of the host star. The temperature of the planet detected by TESS is 330 °C. In 2022, transmission spectroscopy indicated that the planet has either no atmosphere or an opaque atmosphere with high-altitude hazes.

Transmission spectroscopy observations with the James Webb Space Telescope NIRSpec published in 2025 favor the presence of a sulfur dioxide atmosphere. This is likely driven by volcanism, implying that L 98-59 b experiences at least eight times as much volcanism and tidal heating as Io.
