= Eyeball planet =

Hypothetical type of tidally locked planet

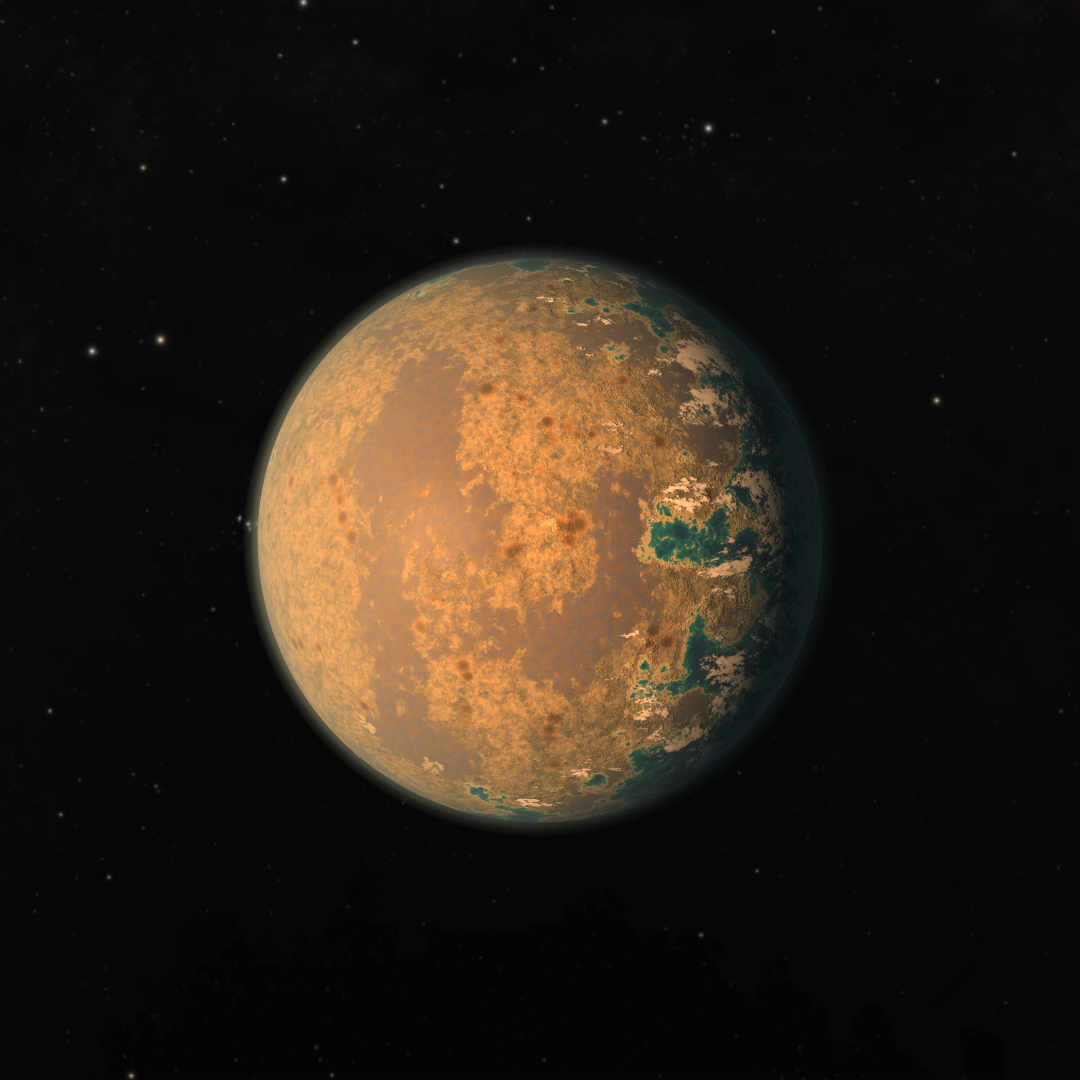
Example of a "hot" eyeball planet's spatial features, with a scalded side facing the star and water on the other side

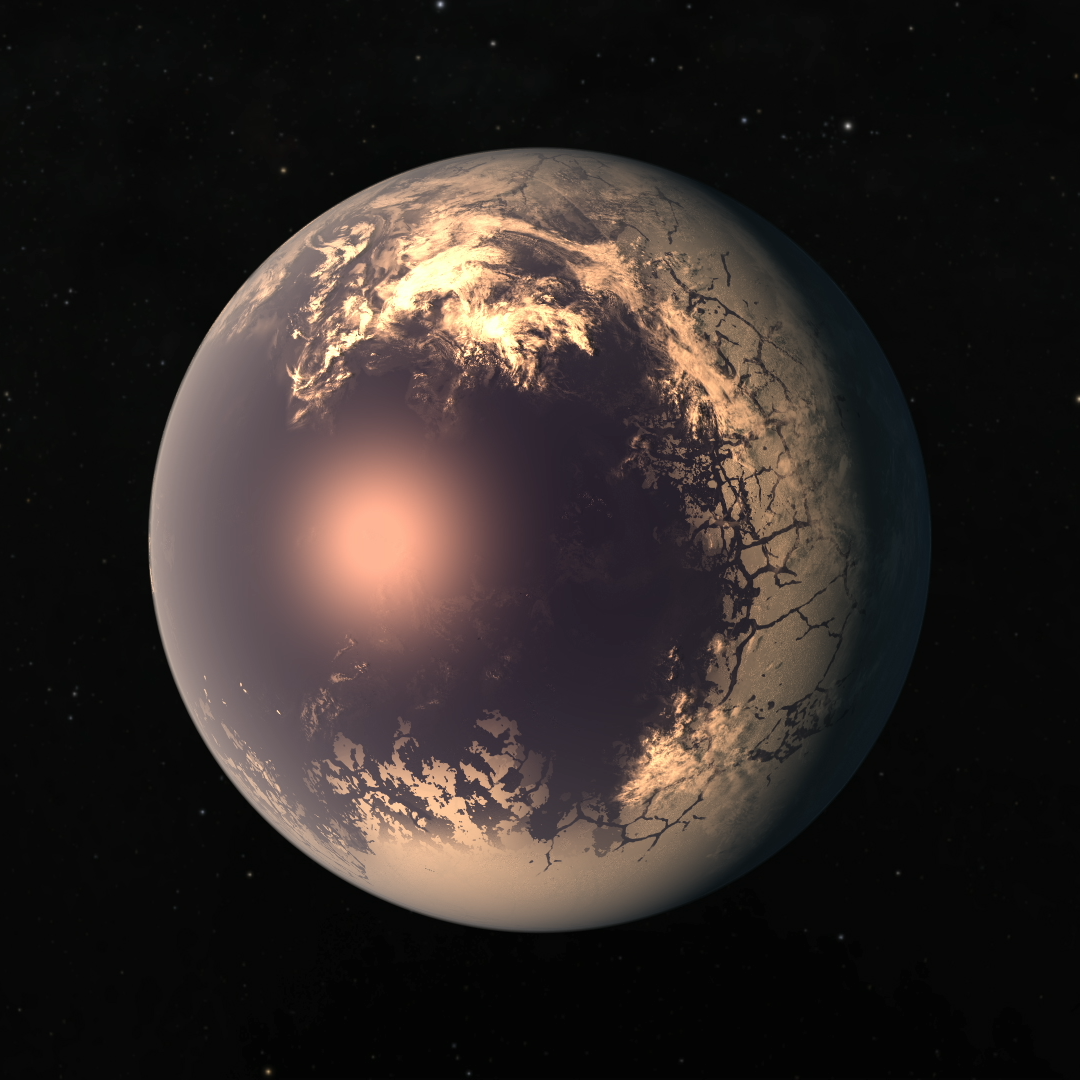
Example of a "cold" eyeball planet's spatial features, with an ice shell pierced by an ocean on the side facing the star

Both images are artist's impressions of exoplanets in the TRAPPIST-1 system (TRAPPIST-1d and TRAPPIST-1f).

An eyeball planet is a hypothetical type of tidally locked planet (one side of the planet faces permanently its star), and such tidal locking induces spatial features (for example in the geography or composition of the planet) resembling an eyeball in the case to contain enough liquids. They are terrestrial planets where liquids may be present, in which tidal locking will induce a spatially dependent temperature gradient (the planet will be hotter on the side facing the star and colder on the other side). If this temperature gradient includes temperatures over the freezing point, it could avoid a snowball state or becoming an ice planet, so that there could be areas in which liquid may exist on the surface of the planet to ring- or disk-shaped areas (then the circular liquid or terrestrial region present under the substellar point, would be like the iris of a human eye, being the frozen part like its white or sclera part).

Such planets are further divided into "hot" and "cold" types, depending on which side of the planet the liquid is present. A "hot" eyeball planet is usually closer to its host star, and the centre of the "eye", facing the star (day side), is made of rock while liquid is present on the opposite side (night side). A "cold" eyeball planet, usually farther from the star, will have liquid on the side facing the host star while the rest of its surface is made of ice and rocks by a cold trap effect.

Because most planetary bodies have a natural tendency to become tidally locked to their host body after enough time has passed, eyeball planets may be common and could host life, particularly in planetary systems orbiting red and brown dwarfs which have lifespans much longer than other main-sequence stars.

Search for life on an eyeball planet in the habitable zone around M dwarf star, a habitable planet with day and night terminator.

== Potential candidates ==
Kepler-1652b is potentially an eyeball planet. The TRAPPIST-1 system may contain several such planets. According to the observations of the James Webb Space Telescope in 2024, the super-Earth (Note: The mass range of super-Earths is disputed.) planet LHS 1140b might either have a thin ice shell with a subsurface ocean or an icy surface covered partially in liquid water, the latter of which is an attribute of "cold" eyeball planet.

== See also ==
- Linear settlement – a type of settlement that could be set up on such planets
- Tidal locking
- Extraterrestrial liquid water
- Surface features of exoplanet
- Terrestrial planet
- Super-Earth
