= Doppler spectroscopy =

Indirect method for finding extrasolar planets and brown dwarfs

Diagram showing how a smaller object (such as an extrasolar planet) orbiting a larger object (such as a star) could produce changes in position and velocity of the latter as they orbit their common center of mass (red cross).

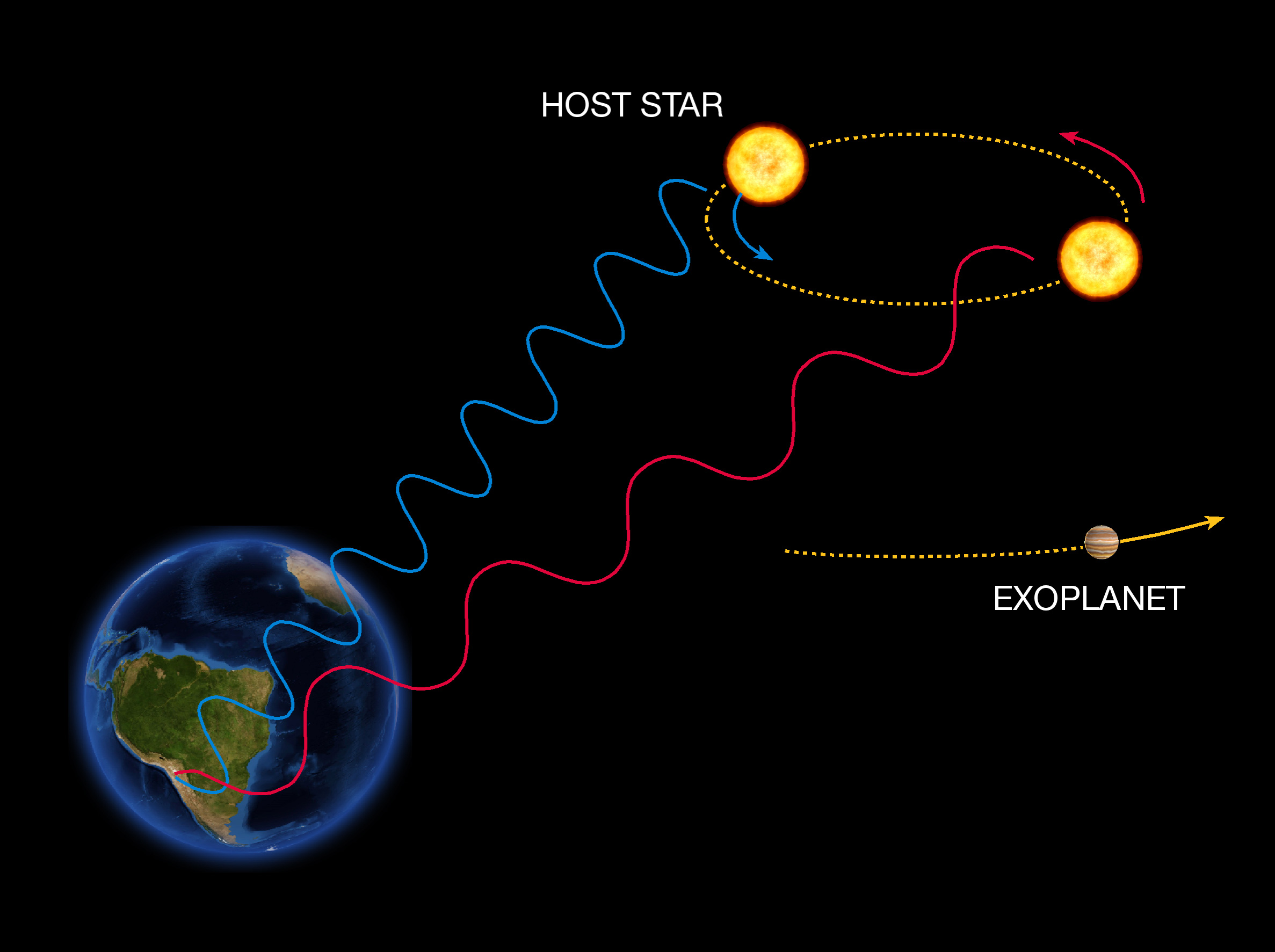
Doppler spectroscopy detects periodic shifts in radial velocity by recording variations in the color of light from the host star. When a star moves towards the Earth, its spectrum is blueshifted, while it is redshifted when it moves away from us. By analyzing these spectral shifts, astronomers can deduce the gravitational influence of extrasolar planets.

Doppler spectroscopy (also known as the radial-velocity method, or colloquially, the wobble method) is an indirect method for detecting extrasolar planets and brown dwarfs from radial-velocity measurements via observation of Doppler shifts in the spectrum of the planet's parent star. As of January 2026, over 1,100 known extrasolar planets (about 19.0% of the total) have been discovered using Doppler spectroscopy.

== History ==
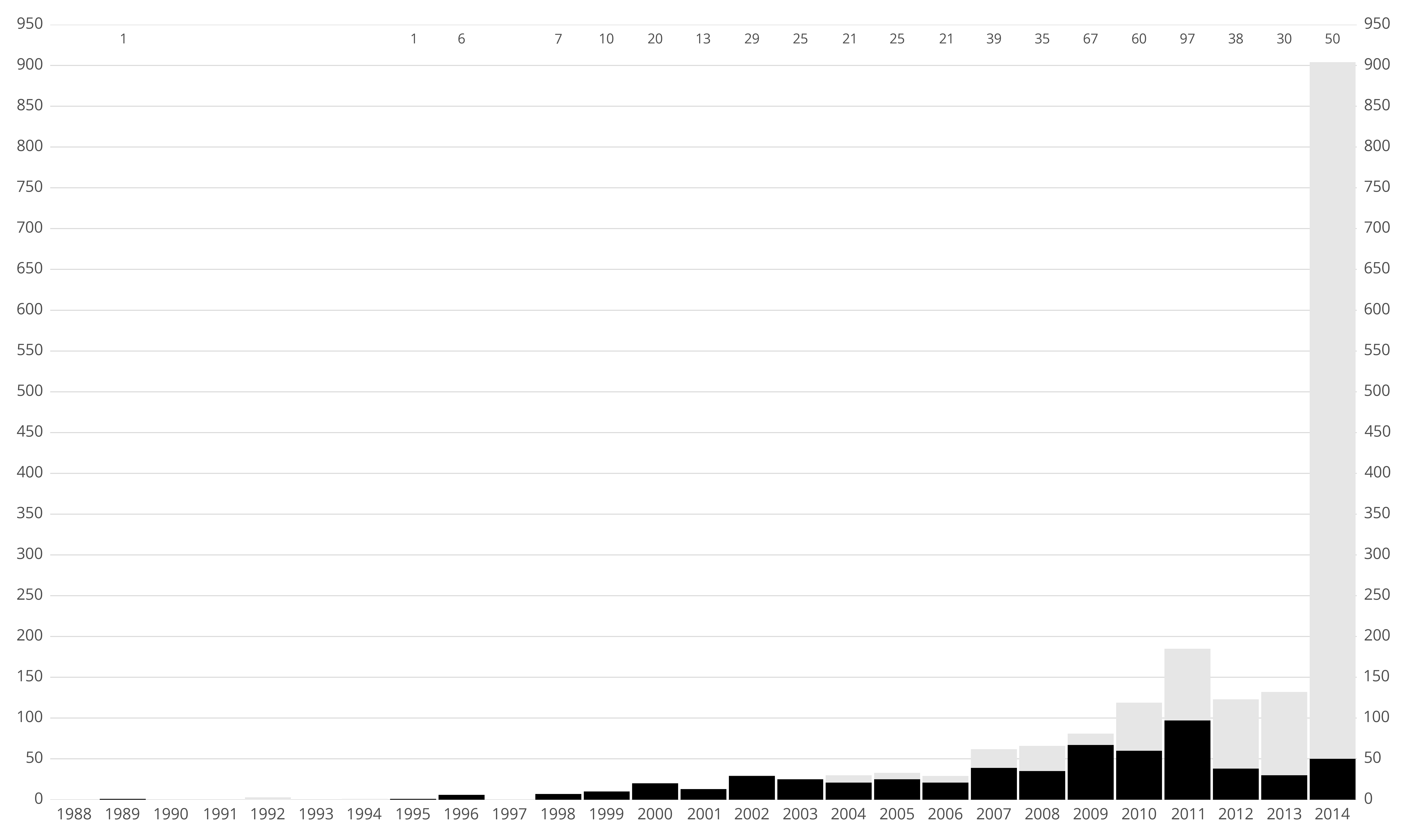
Exoplanets discovered by year (as of February 2014). Those discovered using radial velocity are shown in black, and all other methods are in light grey.

Otto Struve proposed in 1952 the use of powerful spectrographs to detect distant planets. He described how a very large planet, as large as Jupiter, for example, would cause its parent star to wobble slightly as the two objects orbit around their center of mass. He predicted that the small Doppler shifts to the light emitted by the star, caused by its continuously varying radial velocity, would be detectable by the most sensitive spectrographs as tiny redshifts and blueshifts in the star's emission. However, the technology of the time produced radial-velocity measurements with errors of 1,000 m/s or more, making them useless for the detection of orbiting planets. The expected changes in radial velocity are very small – Jupiter causes the Sun to change velocity by about 12.4 m/s over a period of 12 years, and the Earth's effect is only 0.1 m/s over a period of 1 year – so long-term observations by instruments with a very high resolution are required.

Advances in spectrometer technology and observational techniques in the 1980s and 1990s produced instruments capable of detecting the first of many new extrasolar planets. The ELODIE spectrograph, installed at the Haute-Provence Observatory in Southern France in 1993, could measure radial-velocity shifts as low as 7 m/s, low enough for an extraterrestrial observer to detect Jupiter's influence on the Sun. Using this instrument, astronomers Michel Mayor and Didier Queloz identified 51 Pegasi b, a "hot Jupiter" in the constellation Pegasus. Although planets had previously been detected orbiting pulsars, 51 Pegasi b was the first planet ever confirmed to be orbiting a main sequence star, and the first detected using Doppler spectroscopy.

In November 1995, the scientists published their findings in the journal Nature; the paper has since been cited over 1,000 times. Since that date, thousands of exoplanet candidates have been identified, many of which have been detected by Doppler search programs based at the Keck, Lick, and Anglo-Australian Observatories (respectively, the California, Carnegie, and Anglo-Australian planet searches), and teams based at the Geneva Extrasolar Planet Search.

Beginning in the early 2000s, a second generation of planet-hunting spectrographs permitted far more precise measurements. The HARPS spectrograph, installed at the La Silla Observatory in Chile in 2003, can identify radial-velocity shifts as small as 0.3 m/s, enough to locate many possibly rocky, Earth-like planets. A third generation of spectrographs is expected to come online in 2017. With measurement errors estimated below 0.1 m/s, these new instruments would allow an extraterrestrial observer to detect even Earth.

== Procedure ==
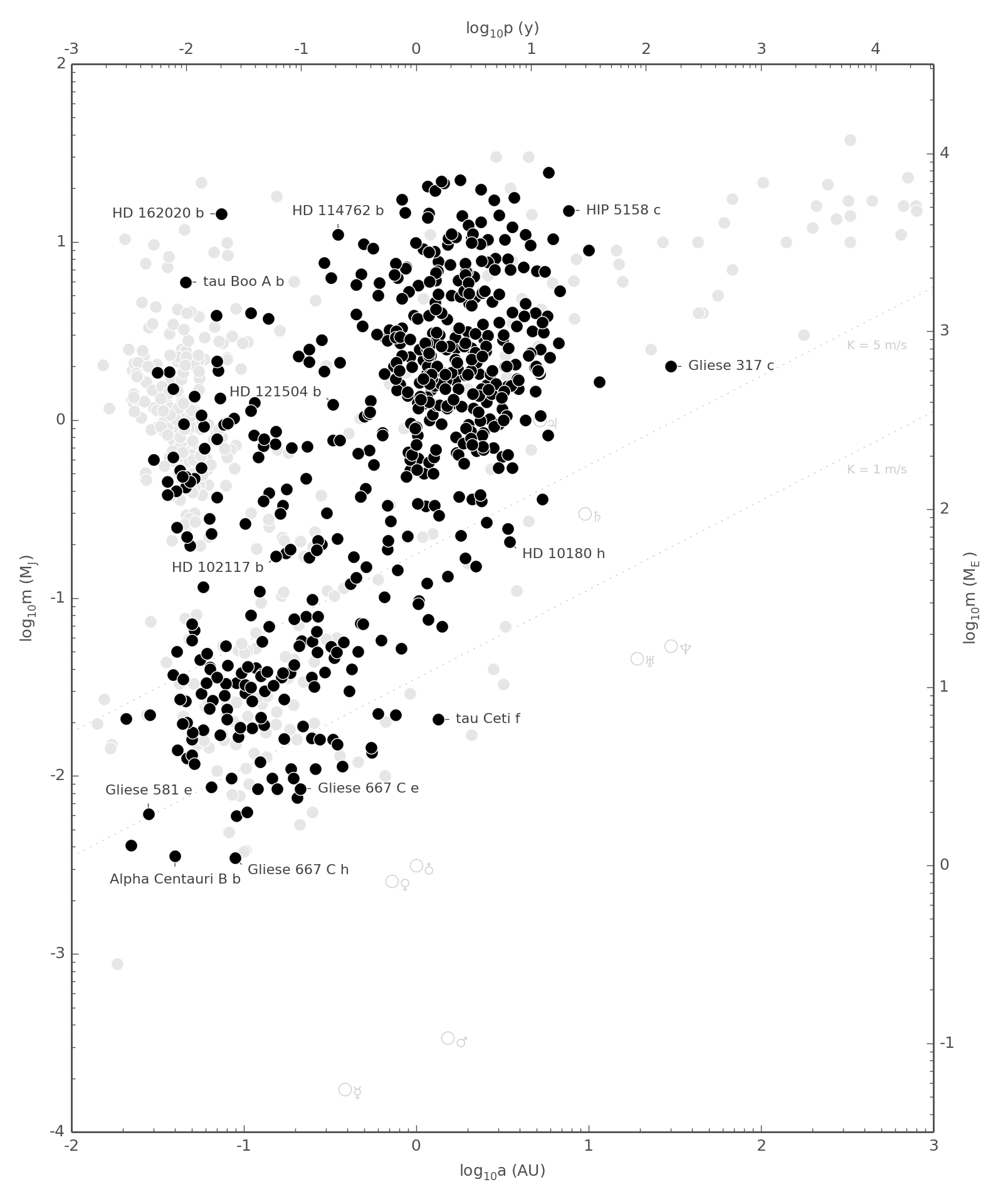
Properties (mass and semimajor axis) of planets discovered through 2013 using radial velocity, compared (light gray) with planets discovered using other methods.

A series of observations is made of the spectrum of light emitted by a star. Periodic variations in the star's spectrum may be detected, with the wavelength of characteristic spectral lines in the spectrum increasing and decreasing regularly over a period of time. Statistical filters are then applied to the data set to cancel out spectrum effects from other sources. Using mathematical best-fit techniques, astronomers can isolate the tell-tale periodic sine wave that indicates a planet in orbit.

If an extrasolar planet is detected, a minimum mass for the planet can be determined from the changes in the star's radial velocity. To find a more precise measure of the mass requires knowledge of the inclination of the planet's orbit. A graph of measured radial velocity versus time will give a characteristic curve (sine curve in the case of a circular orbit), and the amplitude of the curve will allow the minimum mass of the planet to be calculated using the binary mass function.

The Bayesian Kepler periodogram is a mathematical algorithm, used to detect single or multiple extrasolar planets from successive radial-velocity measurements of the star they are orbiting. It involves a Bayesian statistical analysis of the radial-velocity data, using a prior probability distribution over the space determined by one or more sets of Keplerian orbital parameters. This analysis may be implemented using the Markov chain Monte Carlo (MCMC) method.

The method has been applied to the HD 208487 system, resulting in an apparent detection of a second planet with a period of approximately 1000 days. However, this may be an artifact of stellar activity. The method is also applied to the HD 11964 system, where it found an apparent planet with a period of approximately 1 year. However, this planet was not found in re-reduced data, suggesting that this detection was an artifact of the Earth's orbital motion around the Sun.

Although radial-velocity of the star only gives a planet's minimum mass, if the planet's spectral lines can be distinguished from the star's spectral lines then the radial-velocity of the planet itself can be found and this gives the inclination of the planet's orbit and therefore the planet's actual mass can be determined. The first non-transiting planet to have its mass found this way was Tau Boötis b in 2012 when carbon monoxide was detected in the infrared part of the spectrum.

=== Example ===

The graph to the right illustrates the sine curve using Doppler spectroscopy to observe the radial velocity of an imaginary star which is being orbited by a planet in a circular orbit. Observations of a real star would produce a similar graph, although eccentricity in the orbit will distort the curve and complicate the calculations below.

This theoretical star's velocity shows a periodic variance of ±1 m/s, suggesting an orbiting mass that is creating a gravitational pull on this star. Using Kepler's third law of planetary motion, the observed period of the planet's orbit around the star (equal to the period of the observed variations in the star's spectrum) can be used to determine the planet's distance from the star ($r$) using the following equation:

$$r^3=\frac{GM_\mathrm{star}}{4\pi^2}P_\mathrm{star}^2\,$$

where:

- r is the distance of the planet from the star
- G is the gravitational constant
- M_{star} is the mass of the star
- P_{star} is the observed period of the star

Having determined $r$, the velocity of the planet around the star can be calculated using Newton's law of universal gravitation, and the orbit equation:

$$V_\mathrm{PL}=\sqrt{GM_\mathrm{star}/r}\,$$

where $V_\mathrm{PL}$ is the velocity of planet.

The mass of the planet can then be found from the calculated velocity of the planet:

$$M_\mathrm{PL}=\frac{M_\mathrm{star}V_\mathrm{star}}{V_\mathrm{PL}}\,$$

where $V_\mathrm{star}$ is the velocity of parent star. The observed Doppler velocity, $K = V_\mathrm{star}\sin(i)$, where i is the inclination of the planet's orbit to the line perpendicular to the line-of-sight.

Thus, assuming a value for the inclination of the planet's orbit and for the mass of the star, the observed changes in the radial velocity of the star can be used to calculate the mass of the extrasolar planet.

== Radial-velocity comparison tables ==
Planetary mass	Distance AU	Star's radial velocity due to the planet (v_{radial})	Notice
Jupiter (317.8 M_{🜨})	5	12.7 m/s	
Neptune (17.2 M_{🜨})	0.1	4.8 m/s	
Neptune (17.2 M_{🜨})	1	1.5 m/s	
Super-Earth (5 M_{🜨})	0.1	1.4 m/s	
Super-Earth (5 M_{🜨})	1	0.45 m/s	
L 98-59 b (0.4 M_{🜨})	0.02	0.46 m/s	
Earth	0.09	0.30 m/s	
Earth	1	0.09 m/s	

Ref:

Planets
Planet	Planet Type	Semimajor Axis (AU)	Orbital Period	Star's radial velocity due to the planet (m/s)	Detectable by:
51 Pegasi b	Hot Jupiter	0.05	4.23 days	55.9	First-generation spectrograph
55 Cancri Ad	Gas giant	5.77	14.29 years	45.2	First-generation spectrograph
Jupiter	Gas giant	5.20	11.86 years	12.4	First-generation spectrograph
Gliese 581c	Super-Earth	0.07	12.92 days	3.18	Second-generation spectrograph
Saturn	Gas giant	9.58	29.46 years	2.75	Second-generation spectrograph
L 98-59 b	Terrestrial planet	0.02	2.25 days	0.46	Third-generation spectrograph
Neptune	Ice giant	30.10	164.79 years	0.281	Third-generation spectrograph
Earth	Habitable planet	1.00	365.26 days	0.089	Third-generation spectrograph (likely)
Pluto	Dwarf planet	39.26	246.04 years	0.00003	Not detectable

=== For MK-type stars with planets in the habitable zone ===
Stellar mass (M_{☉})	Planetary mass (M_{🜨})	Lum. (L_{☉})	Type	RHAB (AU)	RV (cm/s)	Period (days)
0.10	1.0	8×10^{−4}	M8	0.028	168	6
0.21	1.0	7.9×10^{−3}	M5	0.089	65	21
0.47	1.0	6.3×10^{−2}	M0	0.25	26	67
0.65	1.0	1.6×10^{−1}	K5	0.40	18	115
0.78	2.0	4.0×10^{−1}	K0	0.63	25	209

== Limitations ==
The major limitation with Doppler spectroscopy is that it can only measure movement along the line-of-sight, and so depends on a measurement (or estimate) of the inclination of the planet's orbit to determine the planet's mass. If the orbital plane of the planet happens to line up with the line-of-sight of the observer, then the measured variation in the star's radial velocity is the true value. However, if the orbital plane is tilted away from the line-of-sight, then the true effect of the planet on the motion of the star will be greater than the measured variation in the star's radial velocity, which is only the component along the line-of-sight. As a result, the planet's true mass will be greater than measured.

To correct for this effect, and so determine the true mass of an extrasolar planet, radial-velocity measurements can be combined with astrometric observations, which track the movement of the star across the plane of the sky, perpendicular to the line-of-sight. Astrometric measurements allows researchers to check whether objects that appear to be high-mass planets are more likely to be brown dwarfs.

A further disadvantage is that the gas envelope around certain types of stars can expand and contract, and some stars are variable. This method is unsuitable for finding planets around these types of stars, as changes in the stellar emission spectrum caused by the intrinsic variability of the star can swamp the small effect caused by a planet.

The method is best at detecting very massive objects close to the parent star – so-called "hot Jupiters" – which have the greatest gravitational effect on the parent star, and so cause the largest changes in its radial velocity. Hot Jupiters have the greatest gravitational effect on their host stars because they have relatively small orbits and large masses. Observation of many separate spectral lines and many orbital periods allows the signal-to-noise ratio of observations to be increased, increasing the chance of observing smaller and more distant planets, but planets like the Earth remain undetectable with current instruments. As of 2025, Doppler spectroscopy has successfully moved into the near-infrared (nIR) with sub-meter-per-second precision.

Another limitation in radial velocity measurements is the impact of stellar activity from the host star, which can drown out or even mimic planetary signals. A method of addressing stellar activity is by using Gaussian process modeling to model the radial velocity time series alongside stellar activity indicators, which later can be used to untangle the stellar activity from the planetary signals within the time series.

Left: A representation of a star orbited by a planet. All the movement of the star is along the viewer's line-of-sight; Doppler spectroscopy will give a true value of the planet's mass.
Right: In this case none of the star's movement is along the viewer's line-of-sight and the Doppler spectroscopy method will not detect the planet at all.

== See also ==
- Methods of detecting exoplanets
- Systemic (amateur extrasolar planet search project)
