= Tucana in Chinese astronomy =

The modern constellation Tucana is not included in the Three Enclosures and Twenty-Eight Mansions system of traditional Chinese uranography because its stars are too far south for observers in China to know about them prior to the introduction of Western star charts. Based on the work of Xu Guangqi and the German Jesuit missionary Johann Adam Schall von Bell in the late Ming Dynasty, this constellation has been classified as one of the 23 Southern Asterisms (近南極星區, Jìnnánjíxīngōu) under the name Crane (鶴, Hè) and Bird's Beak (鳥喙, Niǎohuì).

The name of the western constellation in modern Chinese is 杜鵑座 (dù juān zuò), meaning "the cuckoo constellation".

== Stars ==
The map of Chinese constellation in constellation Tucana area consists of :

Four Symbols	Mansion (Chinese name)	Romanization	Translation	Asterisms (Chinese name)	Romanization	Translation	Western star name	Proper Name	Chinese star name	Romanization	Translation
-	近南極星區 (non-mansions)	Jìnnánjíxīngōu (non-mansions)	The Southern Asterisms (non-mansions)	鳥喙	Niǎohuì	Bird's Beak					
-	近南極星區 (non-mansions)	Jìnnánjíxīngōu (non-mansions)	The Southern Asterisms (non-mansions)	鳥喙	Niǎohuì	Bird's Beak	α Tuc	Lang-Exter	鳥喙一	Niǎohuìyī	1st star
-	近南極星區 (non-mansions)	Jìnnánjíxīngōu (non-mansions)	The Southern Asterisms (non-mansions)	鳥喙	Niǎohuì	Bird's Beak	δ Tuc		鳥喙二	Niǎohuìèr	2nd star
-	近南極星區 (non-mansions)	Jìnnánjíxīngōu (non-mansions)	The Southern Asterisms (non-mansions)	鳥喙	Niǎohuì	Bird's Beak	HD 224361		鳥喙三	Niǎohuìsān	3rd star
-	近南極星區 (non-mansions)	Jìnnánjíxīngōu (non-mansions)	The Southern Asterisms (non-mansions)	鳥喙	Niǎohuì	Bird's Beak	β^{1} Tuc		鳥喙四	Niǎohuìsì	4th star
-	近南極星區 (non-mansions)	Jìnnánjíxīngōu (non-mansions)	The Southern Asterisms (non-mansions)	鳥喙	Niǎohuì	Bird's Beak	ρ Tuc		鳥喙五	Niǎohuìwǔ	5th star
-	近南極星區 (non-mansions)	Jìnnánjíxīngōu (non-mansions)	The Southern Asterisms (non-mansions)	鳥喙	Niǎohuì	Bird's Beak	ζ Tuc		鳥喙六	Niǎohuìliù	6th star
-	近南極星區 (non-mansions)	Jìnnánjíxīngōu (non-mansions)	The Southern Asterisms (non-mansions)	鳥喙	Niǎohuì	Bird's Beak	ε Tuc		鳥喙七	Niǎohuìqī	7th star
-	近南極星區 (non-mansions)	Jìnnánjíxīngōu (non-mansions)	The Southern Asterisms (non-mansions)	鳥喙	Niǎohuì	Bird's Beak	η Tuc		鳥喙增一	Niǎohuìzēngyī	1st additional star
-	近南極星區 (non-mansions)	Jìnnánjíxīngōu (non-mansions)	The Southern Asterisms (non-mansions)	鶴	Hè	Crane	γ Tuc		鶴五	Hèwǔ	5th star

== See also ==
- Chinese astronomy
- Traditional Chinese star names
- Chinese constellations
