= Tucana (disambiguation) =

Tucana may refer to:

- Tucana, a constellation in the southern sky, named after a toucan
- Tucana Dwarf, a dwarf galaxy in the Local Group
- Tucana (Chinese astronomy), one of the 23 Southern Asterisms (近南極星區, Jìnnánjíxīngōu) under the name Crane (鶴, Hè) and Bird's Beak (鳥喙, Niǎohuì)
- Tucana (AK-88), renamed Arthur C. Ely, and used as a U.S. Army Engineer Port Repair ship
- Tucano language, also known as Tukana, Tucana, Tukano, Dasea, Koneá, Koreá, Patsoka, Wahyara; autonym: Dahseyé, a Tucanoan language spoken in Amazonas

== See also ==
- Toucan, a bird of the family Ramphastidae
