= NGC 330 =

Open star cluster in the constellation Tucana

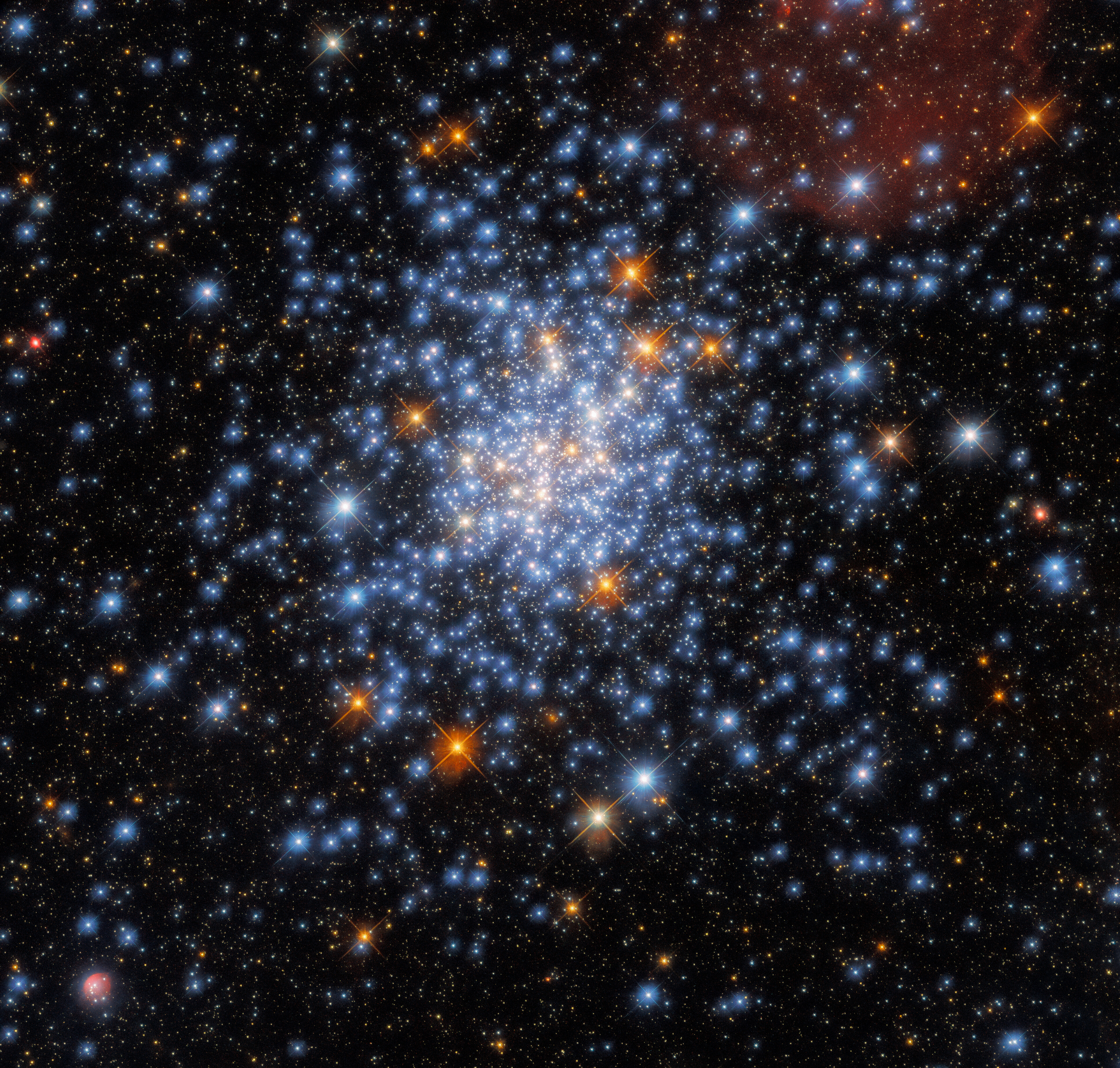
- The star cluster NGC 330; Credit: Hubble Space Telescope

Observation data (J2000 epoch)
- Right ascension: 00^{h} 56^{m} 17.6^{s}
- Declination: −72° 27′ 47″
- Distance: 182000
- Apparent magnitude (V): 9.60
- Apparent dimensions (V): 2.8′ × 2.5′

Physical characteristics
- Mass: 5.4×10^{4} M_{☉}
- Estimated age: 0.09±0.05 Gyr
- Other designations: ESO 029-SC 024.

Associations
- Constellation: Tucana

NGC 330 is an open cluster in the Small Magellanic Cloud. It is located in the constellation Tucana. It was discovered on 1 August 1826 by James Dunlop. It was described by Dreyer as "a globular cluster, very bright, small, a little extended, stars from 13th to 15th magnitude." At an aperture of 31.0 arcseconds, the apparent V-band magnitude is 9.60, but at this wavelength, it also has 0.36 magnitudes of interstellar extinction.

NGC 330 is quite young, at about 40 million years old, and has a large proportion of Be stars. Its estimated mass is 5.4×10^{4} M_{☉}, and its total luminosity is 8.93×10^{5} L_{☉}, leading to a mass-to-luminosity ratio of 0.06 M_{☉}/L_{☉}. All else equal, older star clusters have higher mass-to-luminosity ratios; that is, they have lower luminosities for the same mass. About 34% of the massive star population in NGC 330 is estimated to be in a close binary star system; this is lower than clusters in the Large Magellanic Cloud and the Milky Way, but it is unknown if this is because NGC 330 is metal-poor or is older than the compared clusters.
