= Gliese 54 =

Proximal star in the constellation Tucana

Observation data Epoch J2000 Equinox ICRS
- Constellation: Tucana
- Right ascension: 01^{h} 10^{m} 22.8809^{s}
- Declination: −67° 26′ 41.949″
- Apparent magnitude (V): 9.80

Characteristics
- Spectral type: M2.5 (composite)

Astrometry
Proper motion (μ)	RA: 386.2±0.2 mas/yr Dec.: 579.7±0.1 mas/yr
Parallax (π)	126.9±0.4 mas
Distance	25.70 ± 0.08 ly (7.88 ± 0.02 pc)
Absolute magnitude (M_{V})	+10.23

Orbit
Primary	Gliese 54 A
Name	Gliese 54 B
Period (P)	1.14434^{+0.00022}_{−0.00022} yr
Semi-major axis (a)	0.12619±0.00039" (1.00 AU)
Eccentricity (e)	0.1718±0.0024
Inclination (i)	125.32^{+0.35}_{−0.35}°

Details

Gliese 54 A
Mass	0.43 M_{☉}
Radius	0.51 R_{☉}
Temperature	4250 K
Metallicity	0.17
Rotational velocity (v sin i)	-15.0 km/s

Gliese 54 B
Mass	0.3 M_{☉}

Other designations
- NSV 427, CD−68°47, GJ 54, HIP 5496, LHS 1208, 2MASS J01102281-6726425

Database references
SIMBAD	data
ARICNS	data

Gliese 54, also known as HIP 5496 and LHS 1208, is a nearby star system. It is 25.7 light-years away, in the constellation of Tucana, close to the edge, almost in the neighboring Hydrus. It is below the threshold of brightness to be observable to the naked eye with an apparent magnitude of +9.80.

The two stars of this system have an orbital period a little over a year, and are smaller than the Sun. The main component is a red dwarf of spectral type M2 with an effective temperature of 4,250 K, a mass 43% that of the Sun and a radius 51% that of the Sun. The companion, a red dwarf which brightness is about one magnitude lower than the primary, has been resolved with the instrument NICMOS installed in the Hubble Space Telescope. It is 30% as massive as the Sun.

In the SIMBAD database it appears listed as a variable star, getting the provisional designation NSV 427 from the New Catalogue of Suspected Variable Stars.

The closest stars to Gliese 54 are Zeta Tucanae, a solar analog at 3.1 light-years, and Beta Hydri, at 5.1 light-years.

== See also ==
- List of nearest stars and brown dwarfs
