= NGC 406 =

Spiral galaxy in the constellation Tucana

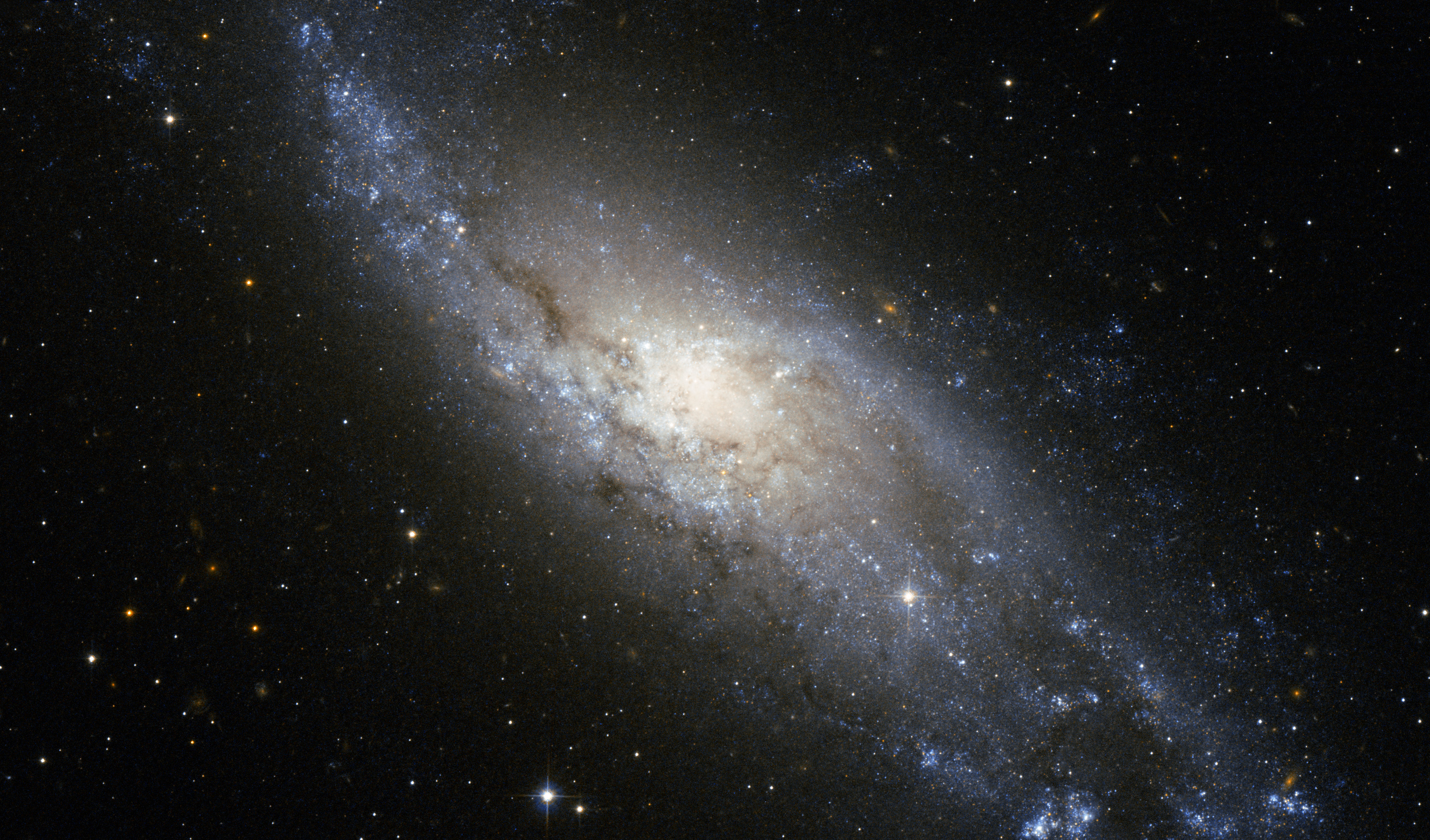
- NGC 406, by Hubble Space Telescope

Observation data (J2000 epoch)
- Constellation: Tucana
- Right ascension: 01^{h} 07^{m} 25.060^{s}
- Declination: −69° 52′ 45.27″
- Redshift: 0.005030
- Heliocentric radial velocity: 1508
- Distance: 66.30 ± 6.27 Mly (20.329 ± 1.923 Mpc)
- Apparent magnitude (B): 13.02

Characteristics
- Type: SA(s)c
- Size: 60,000 ly (18,000 pc)

Other designations
- ESO 51-18, PGC 3980

NGC 406 is a spiral galaxy quite similar to the well known Whirlpool Galaxy, located some 65 million light-years away, in the southern constellation of Tucana (the Toucan) and discovered in 1834 by John Herschel. It is described in the New General Catalogue as "faint, very large, round, very gradually a little brighter middle". NGC 406 is about 60000 light-years across, roughly half the diameter of the Milky Way.

== Gallery ==
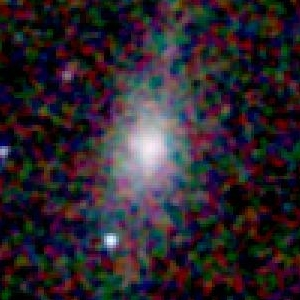
Image from the 2MASS
