= Eta Tucanae =

Star in the constellation Tucana

- Location of η Tucanae (circled)

Observation data Epoch J2000 Equinox ICRS
- Constellation: Tucana
- Right ascension: 23^{h} 57^{m} 35.07852^{s}
- Declination: −64° 17′ 53.6229″
- Apparent magnitude (V): +5.00

Characteristics
- Evolutionary stage: main sequence
- Spectral type: A1V
- U−B color index: +0.08
- B−V color index: +0.06

Astrometry
Radial velocity (R_{v})	+32.50 km/s
Proper motion (μ)	RA: +78.850 mas/yr Dec.: −62.049 mas/yr
Parallax (π)	21.2425±0.3639 mas
Distance	154 ± 3 ly (47.1 ± 0.8 pc)
Absolute magnitude (M_{V})	1.62

Details
Mass	1.94 M_{☉}
Radius	1.8 R_{☉}
Luminosity	23 L_{☉}
Surface gravity (log g)	4.31 cgs
Temperature	9,057 K
Rotational velocity (v sin i)	190 km/s

Other designations
- η Tuc, CPD−64°4391, FK5 2026, GC 33223, HD 224392, HIP 118121, HR 9062, SAO 255609, GSC 09130-01766

Database references
SIMBAD	data

Eta Tucanae, Latinized from η Tucanae, is a probable binary star system in the southern constellation of Tucana, a few degrees to the north of Epsilon Tucanae. It is visible to the naked eye as a dim, white-hued point of light with an apparent visual magnitude of +5.00. parallax measurements provide a distance estimate of about 154 light years from the Sun, and it is drifting further away with a mean radial velocity of +32.5 km/s. It is a member of the 30 million year old Tucana-Horologium association of co-moving stars.

The radial velocity for Eta Tucanae displays strong oscillations, suggesting this is a spectroscopic binary system. A companion was directly detected in 2014, but this result has some unexplained anomalies. The primary component is an A-type main-sequence star with a stellar classification of A1V. It is spinning rapidly with a projected rotational velocity of 190 km/s, giving it an equatorial bulge that is 15% larger than the polar radius. The star has 1.9 times the mass of the Sun and 1.8 times the Sun's radius. It is radiating 23 times the luminosity of the Sun from its photosphere at an effective temperature of 9,057 K.
