= NGC 416 =

Globular cluster located in the constellation Tucana

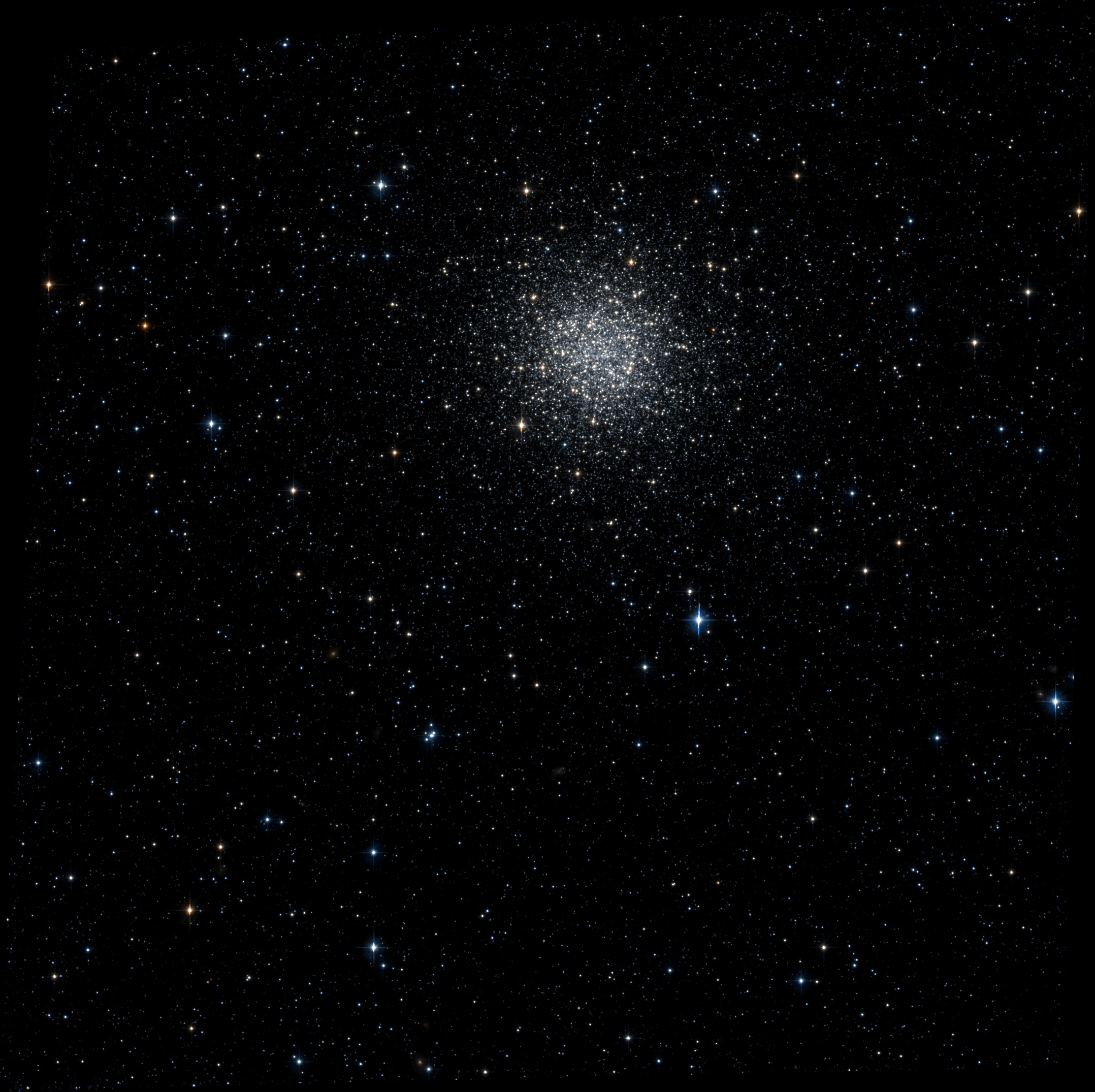
- NGC 416 by Hubble Space Telescope

Observation data (J2000 epoch)
- Right ascension: 01^{h} 07^{m} 58.5^{s}
- Declination: −72° 21′ 18″
- Distance: 199,000 ± 9,800 ly (61,000 ± 3,000 pc)
- Apparent magnitude (V): 11.42
- Apparent dimensions (V): 1.2′ × 1.2′

Physical characteristics
- Mass: 8.0×10^{4} M_{☉}
- Estimated age: 6.60±0.80 Gyr
- Other designations: ESO 029-SC 032.

Associations
- Constellation: Tucana

NGC 416 is a globular cluster located in the constellation Tucana. It was discovered on September 5, 1826, by James Dunlop. It was described by Dreyer as "faint, pretty small, round, gradually brighter middle". At a distance of about 199,000 ± 9,800 ly (61,000 ± 3,000 pc), it is located within the Small Magellanic Cloud. At an aperture of 31 arcseconds, its apparent V-band magnitude is 11.42, but at this wavelength, it has 0.25 magnitudes of interstellar extinction.

NGC 416 is about 6.6 billion years old. Its estimated mass is 8.0×10^{4} M_{☉}, and its total luminosity is 1.12×10^{5} L_{☉}, leading to a mass-to-luminosity ratio of 0.72 M_{☉}/L_{☉}. All else equal, older star clusters have higher mass-to-luminosity ratios; that is, they have lower luminosities for the same mass.

== See also ==
- List of NGC objects (1–1000)
