= NGC 256 =

Open cluster in the constellation Tucana

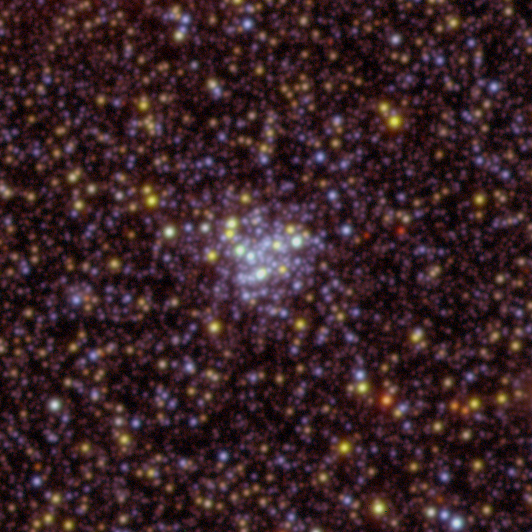
- NGC 256 with DECam

Observation data (J2000 epoch)
- Right ascension: 00^{h} 45^{m} 54.11^{s}
- Declination: −73° 30′ 23.9″
- Apparent magnitude (V): 12.50
- Apparent dimensions (V): 0.9′ × 0.9′

Physical characteristics
- Mass: 1.3×10^{3} M_{☉}
- Estimated age: 83 Myr
- Other designations: Kron 23, ESO 29-SC11

Associations
- Constellation: Tucana

NGC 256 (also known as ESO 29-SC11) is open cluster in the constellation Tucana. It was discovered by John Frederick William Herschel on April 11, 1834.
