= NGC 7329 =

Galaxy in the constellation Tucana

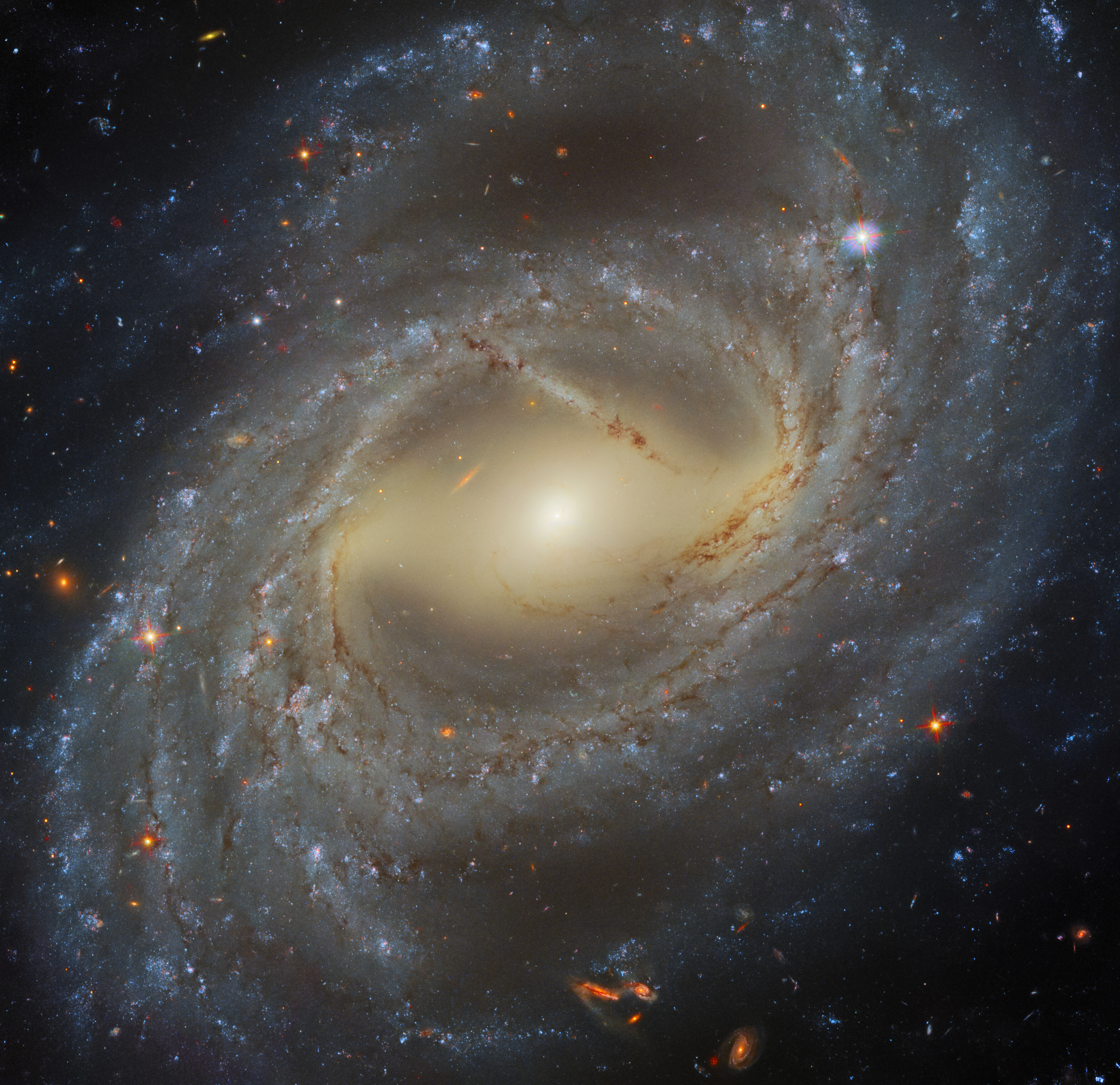
- NGC 7329 imaged by the Hubble Space Telescope

Observation data (J2000 epoch)
- Constellation: Tucana
- Right ascension: 22^{h} 40^{m} 24.2383^{s}
- Declination: −66° 28′ 44.142″
- Distance: 145.67 ± 3.35 Mly (44.662 ± 1.028 Mpc)
- Group or cluster: NGC 7329 group (LGG 462)
- Apparent magnitude (V): 12.1
- Apparent magnitude (B): 12.51
- Surface brightness: 23.36 mag/arcsec2

Characteristics
- Type: SB(r)b
- Size: ~233,000 ly (71.45 kpc) (estimated)
- Apparent size (V): 3.9′ × 2.6′

Other designations
- ESO 109-12, AM 2236-664, IRAS F22369-6644, PGC 69453

NGC 7329 is a large barred spiral galaxy located in the constellation Tucana. Its velocity with respect to the cosmic microwave background is 3,148±8 km/s, which corresponds to a Hubble distance of 151.4 ± 10.6 Mly (46.43 ± 3.25 Mpc). Additionally, 29 non-redshift measurements give a closer mean distance of 145.67 ± 3.35 Mly (44.662 ± 1.028 Mpc). It was discovered by British astronomer John Herschel on 20 July 1835.

The luminosity class of NGC 7329 is II and it has a broad HI line.

== Supernovae ==
Two supernovae have been observed in NGC 7329:

- SN 2006bh (Type Ia, mag. 14.8) was discovered by South African amateur astronomer Berto Monard, in Pretoria, on 2 April 2006.
- SN 2009iu (Type Ib, mag. 15.5) was discovered on 1 September 2009 by the CHASE (Chilean Automatic Supernova Search) project, a project searching for supernovae visible from astronomical observatories in the southern hemisphere.

== NGC 7329 group ==
NGC 7329 is a member of a group of galaxies that bears its name. The NGC 7329 group (also known as LGG 462) has at least 11 members, including NGC 7358, NGC 7408, NGC 7417, IC 5222, IC 5227, IC 5244, IC 5250, IC 5266, IC 5272 and ESO 109-32.

== See also ==
- List of NGC objects (7001–7840)
- List of barred Magellanic spiral galaxies
- List of spiral galaxies
