= NGC 432 =

Lenticular galaxy in the constellation Tucana

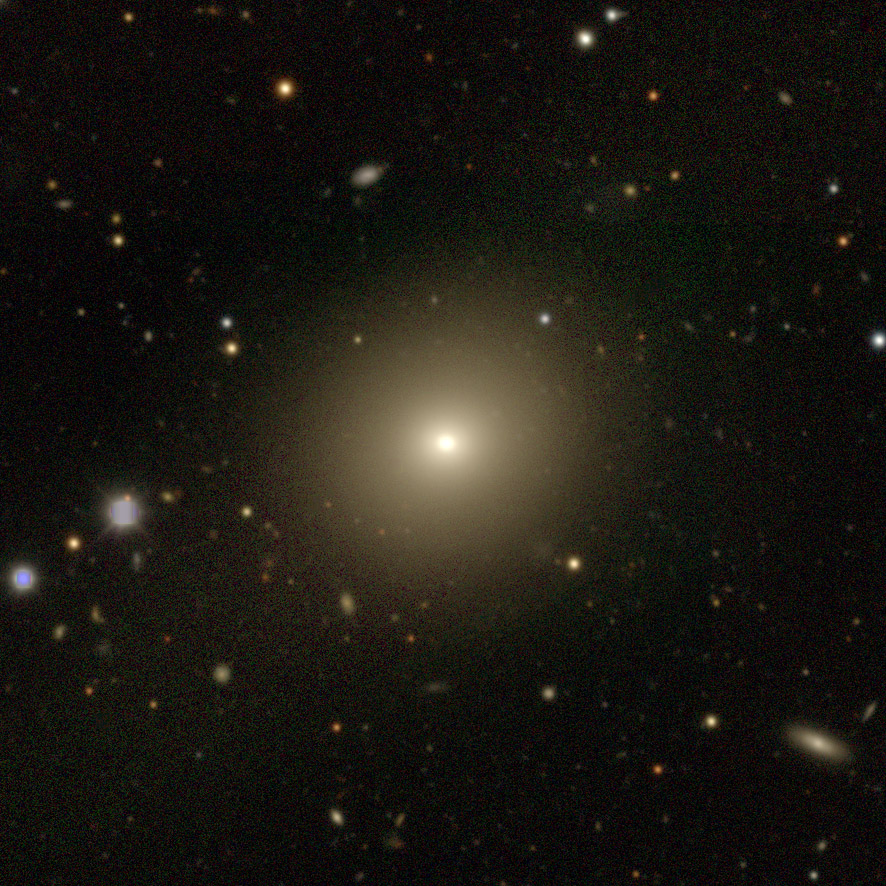
- NGC 432 as seen by DECam

Observation data (J2000 epoch)
- Constellation: Tucana
- Right ascension: 01^{h} 11^{m} 46.2^{s}
- Declination: −61° 31′ 40″
- Redshift: 0.026929
- Heliocentric radial velocity: 8,073 km/s
- Apparent magnitude (V): 13.93
- Absolute magnitude (V): -22.78

Characteristics
- Type: S0^-
- Apparent size (V): 1.3' × 1.2'

Other designations
- ESO 113- G 022, 2MASX J01114624-6131394, ESO-LV 1130220, PGC 4290.

NGC 432 is a lenticular galaxy of type S0^- located in the constellation Tucana. It was discovered on October 6, 1834 by John Herschel. It was described by Dreyer as "faint, small, round, gradually brighter middle, 12th magnitude star to east."
