= NGC 294 =

Open star cluster in the constellation Tucana

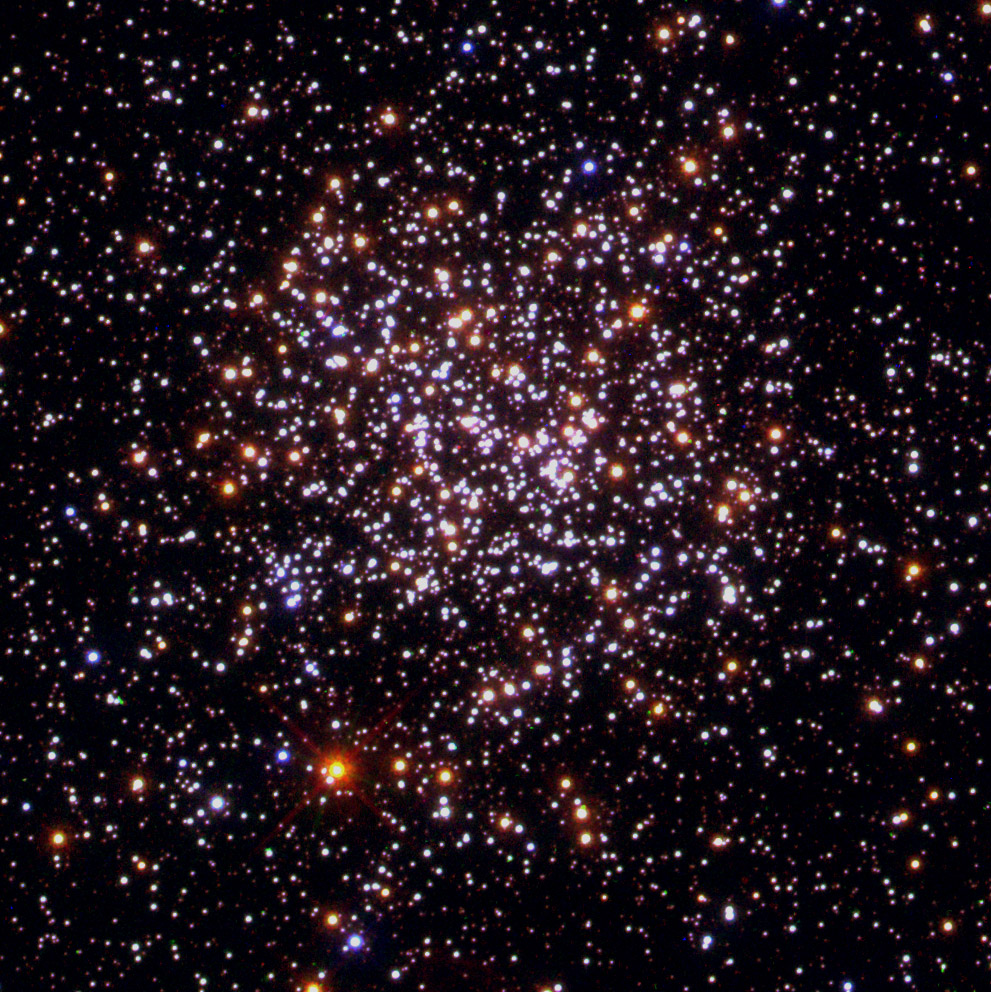
- NGC 294 imaged by the Hubble Space Telescope; Credit: NASA/ESA Hubble Space Telescope

Observation data (J2000 epoch)
- Right ascension: 00^{h} 53^{m} 04.7^{s}
- Declination: −73° 22′ 49″
- Distance: ~200000 ly
- Apparent magnitude (V): 12.24
- Apparent dimensions (V): 1.7′ × 1.7′

Physical characteristics
- Mass: 6.5×10^{3} M_{☉}
- Estimated age: 500 Myr
- Other designations: ESO 029-SC 022.

Associations
- Constellation: Tucana

NGC 294 is an open cluster located in the Small Magellanic Cloud in the constellation Tucana. It was discovered on April 11, 1834, by John Herschel, although it was possibly observed on September 5, 1826, by James Dunlop.
