= NGC 176 =

Cluster in the constellation Tucana

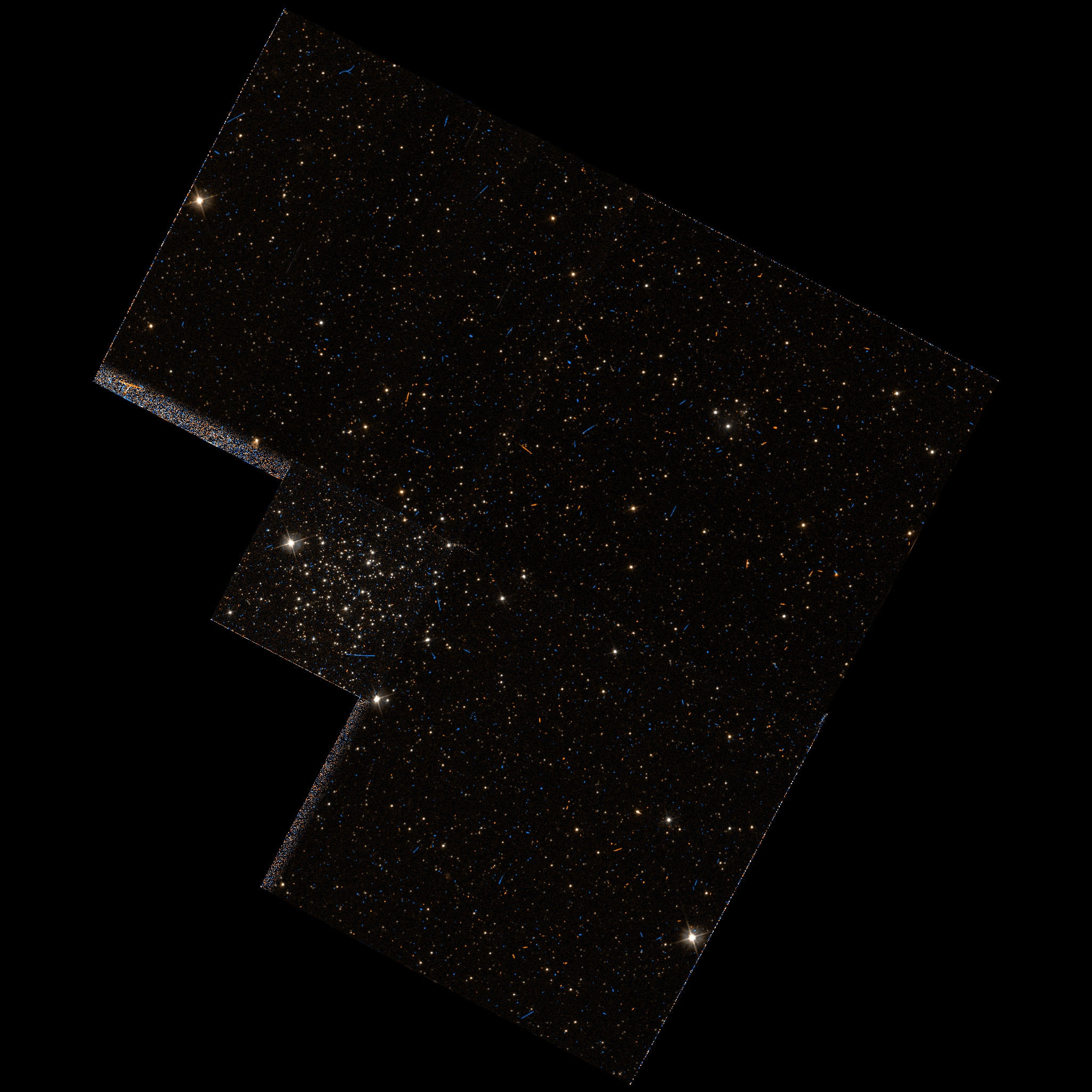

Observation data (J2000 epoch)
- Right ascension: 00^{h} 35^{m} 57.9^{s}
- Declination: −73° 09′ 59″
- Apparent magnitude (V): 13.01

Physical characteristics
- Mass: 3.5×10^{3} M_{☉}
- Estimated age: 130 Myr
- Other designations: ESO 029-SC 002.

Associations
- Constellation: Tucana

NGC 176 is an open cluster in the constellation Tucana. It is located within the Small Magellanic Cloud. It was discovered on August 12, 1834, by John Herschel.

== See also ==
- Open cluster
- List of NGC objects (1–1000)
- Tucana
