= NGC 269 =

Open star cluster in the constellation Tucana

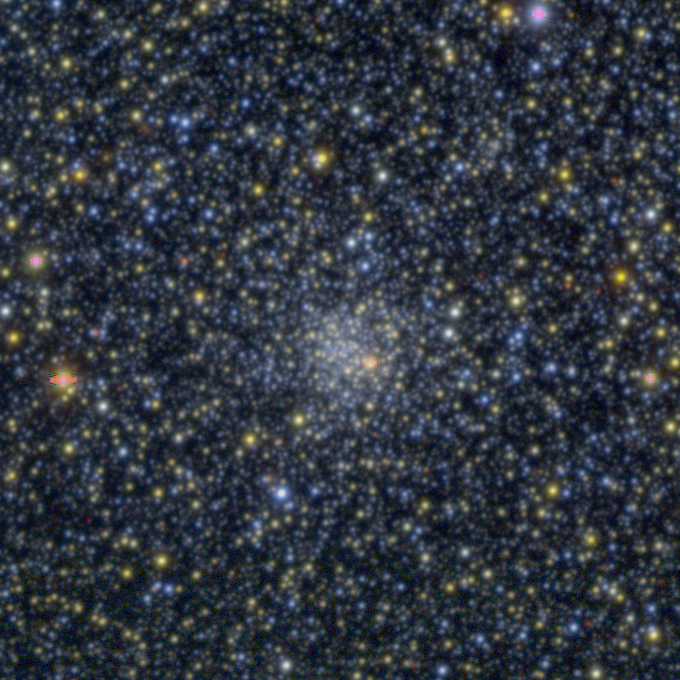
- NGC 269 as seen by DECam

Observation data (J2000 epoch)
- Right ascension: 00^{h} 48^{m} 22.0^{s}
- Declination: −73° 31′ 54″
- Distance: ~200000
- Apparent magnitude (V): 12.59
- Apparent dimensions (V): 1.2' x 1.2'

Physical characteristics
- Other designations: ESO 029-SC 016, 6dF J0048220-733154.

Associations
- Constellation: Tucana

NGC 269 is an open cluster in the Small Magellanic Cloud. It is located in the constellation Tucana. It was discovered on November 5, 1836 by John Herschel.
