= NGC 419 =

Globular cluster in the constellation Tucana

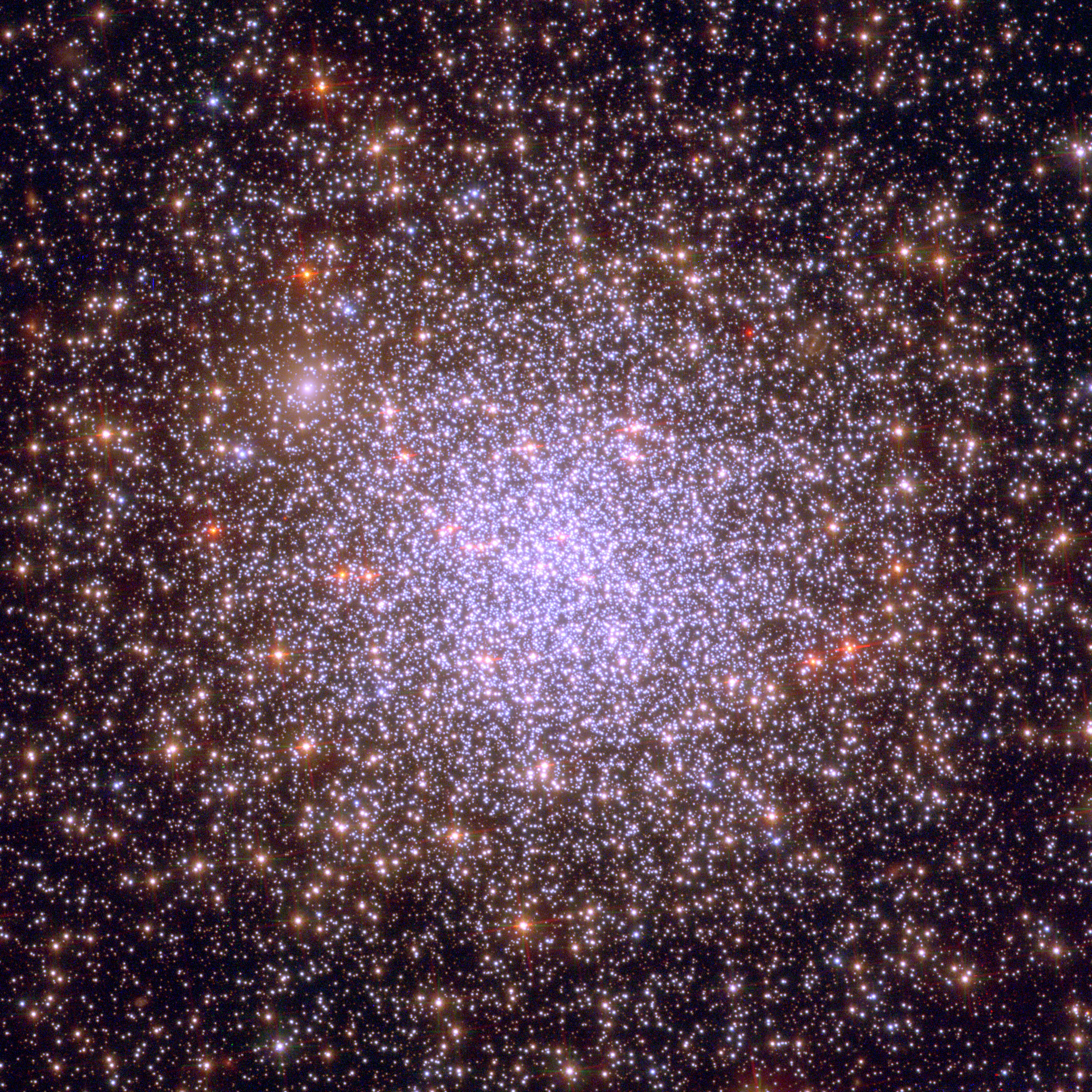
- NGC 419 as seen by the Hubble Space Telescope; Credit: NASA/ESA Hubble

Observation data (J2000 epoch)
- Right ascension: 01^{h} 08^{m} 17.2^{s}
- Declination: −72° 53′ 01″
- Distance: 186,000 ± 13,000 ly (57,000 ± 4,000 pc)
- Apparent magnitude (V): 10.30
- Apparent dimensions (V): 2.8′ × 2.8′

Physical characteristics
- Mass: 6.4×10^{4} M_{☉}
- Estimated age: 1.45±0.05 Gyr
- Other designations: Kron 58, Lindsay 85, ESO 29-33, LI-SMC 182, OGLE-CL SMC 159, RZ2005 174.

Associations
- Constellation: Tucana

NGC 419 is a globular cluster located approximately 57,000 pc (190,000 ly) from Earth in the constellation Tucana. It was discovered on September 2, 1826, by James Dunlop. It was described by Dreyer as "pretty large, pretty bright, round, gradually brighter middle". At a distance of about 186,000 light years (57,000 parsecs), it is located within the Small Magellanic Cloud. At an aperture of 50 arcseconds, its apparent V-band magnitude is 10.30, but at this wavelength, it has 0.15 magnitudes of interstellar extinction.

NGC 419 is about 1.45 billion years old. Its estimated mass is 6.4×10^{4} M_{☉}, and its total luminosity is 3.49×10^{5} L_{☉}, leading to a mass-to-luminosity ratio of 0.18 M_{☉}/L_{☉}. All else equal, older star clusters have higher mass-to-luminosity ratios; that is, they have lower luminosities for the same mass.

== See also ==
- List of NGC objects (1–1000)
