= NGC 395 =

Open cluster located in the constellation Tucana

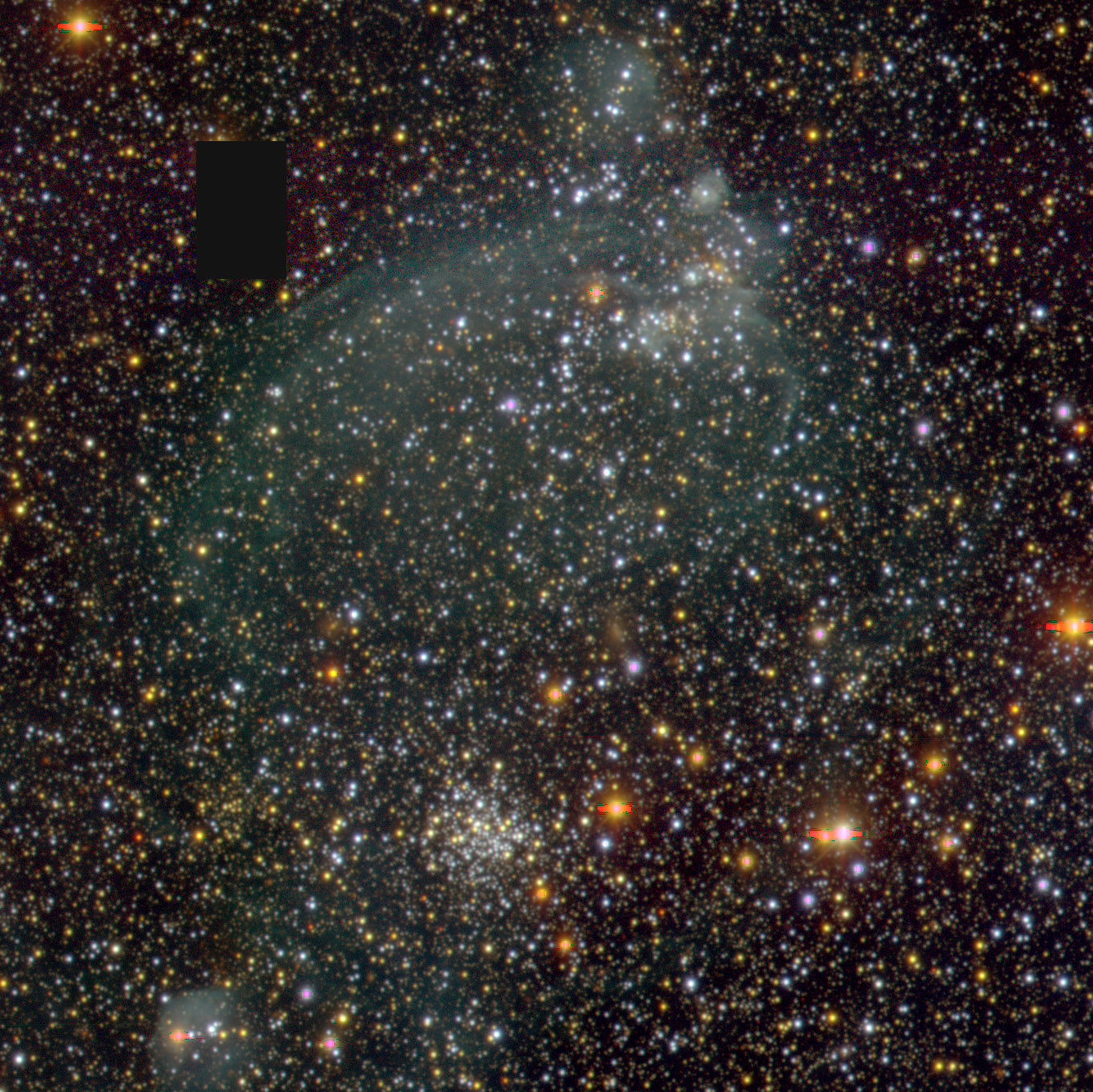
- Star Clusters NGC 395 (top) and IC 1624 (bottom)

Observation data (J2000 epoch)
- Right ascension: 01^{h} 05^{m} 08.3^{s}
- Declination: −71° 59′ 27″

Physical characteristics
- Other designations: ESO 051-SC 016.

Associations
- Constellation: Tucana

NGC 395 is an open cluster located in the constellation Tucana. It was discovered on August 1, 1826, by James Dunlop. It was described by Dreyer as "very faint, pretty large, round, gradually a little brighter middle."

== See also ==
- List of NGC objects (1–1000)
