= NGC 7734 =

Galaxy in the constellation Tucana

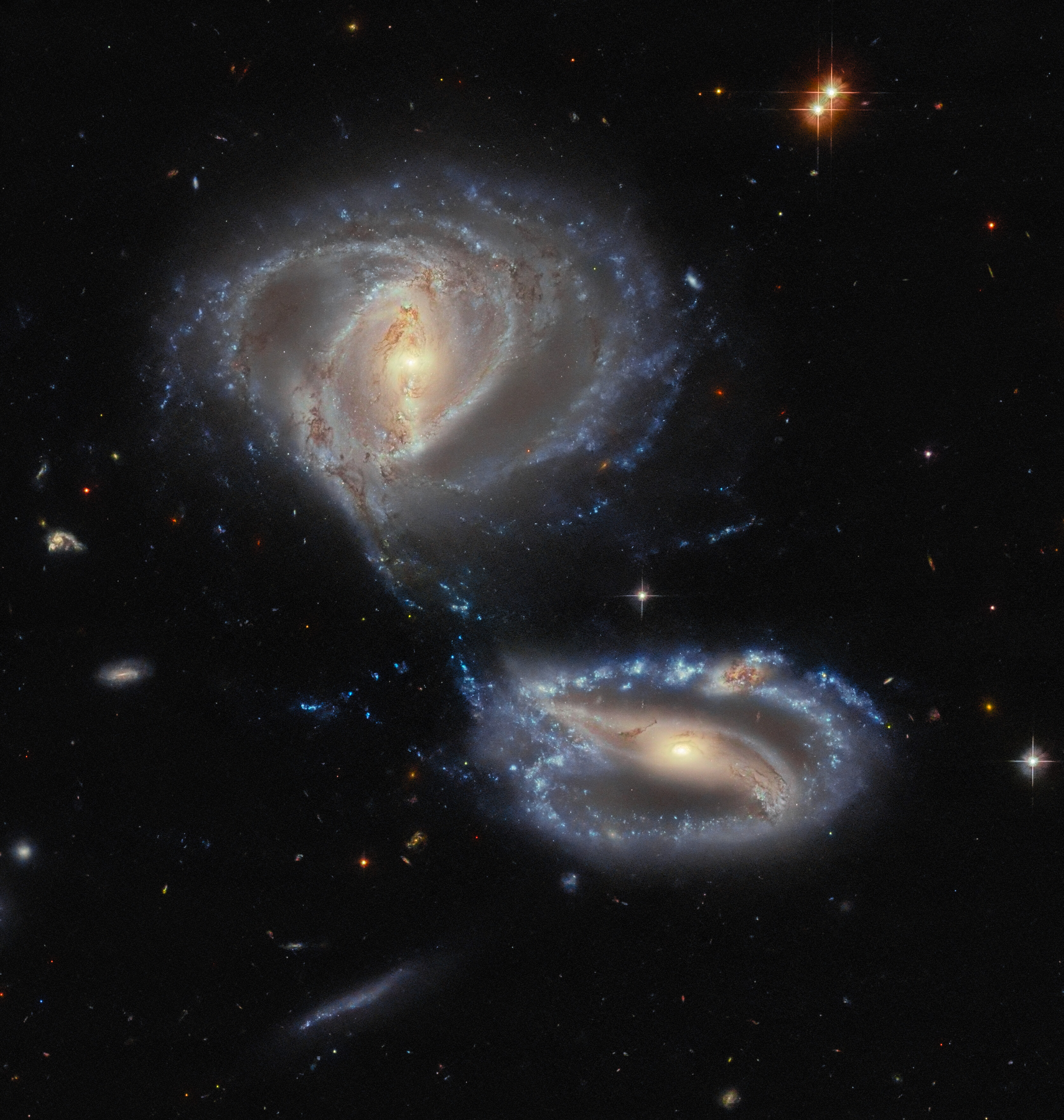
- HST image of NGC 7734 (top). The galaxy on the bottom is NGC 7733.

Observation data (J2000 epoch)
- Constellation: Tucana
- Right ascension: 23^{h} 42^{m} 42.96^{s}
- Declination: −65° 56′ 40.69″
- Redshift: 0.035271
- Heliocentric radial velocity: 10,574 km/s ± 18
- Distance: 514.9 Mly (157.87) Mpc
- Apparent magnitude (V): 13.1

Characteristics
- Type: (R')SB(r)b pec?
- Size: ~283,300 ly (86.87 kpc) (estimated)

Other designations
- 6dF J2342429-655641, ESO 110-G023, JB 58, PGC 72183, RR 402b, 2MASX J23424291-6556405, AM 2339-661 NED02

NGC 7734 is a barred spiral galaxy located in the southern constellation of Tucana. The redshift of the galaxy is (z) 0.035 and it was first discovered by an English astronomer named John Herschel on November 2, 1834, who described it as a faint small object. This galaxy makes up part of an interacting trio of galaxies alongside NGC 7733 with an estimated separation of around 48.3 kiloparsecs from each other.

== Description ==
NGC 7734 is a spiral galaxy of type (R')SB(r)pec morphology with ring features and a total stellar mass of 64.6 × 10^{10} M_{☉}. It is classified to be a type 2 Seyfert galaxy and forms an interacting pair with the nearby barred spiral galaxy NGC 7733, connected via a tidal bridge. When observed, it is found to contain clusters of mainly old reddened stars, suggesting the lack of recent signs of any star formation activity due to strong gravitational interactions, while NGC 7733 displays young star forming regions. The black hole mass of NGC 7734 is estimated to be around 0.90–3.18 × 10^{8} M_{☉}.

A study published in 2021 has confirmed NGC 7734 and NGC 7733 are no longer an interacting pair and could be an interacting trio, given the knot feature on the northwest side of NGC 7733 was reclassified to be a bulge component of another separate galaxy called NGC 7733N, which appears redshifted by around 650 kilometers per seconds and is also taking part in the interaction. The nucleus of NGC 7734 is also revealed to be active and as such contains a low ionization nuclear emission-region (LINER) that is located from the position of its central region.

In 2025, it was determined NGC 7734 has a central feature present that bears a resemblance to both a disk and spiral arm structures that are located on the outer part of the galaxy. It also has a classical bulge that has a radius of about 230 parsecs and also a secondary bulge appearing as disk-like with an approximate radius of 1.15 kiloparsecs. The stellar bar feature of the galaxy contains young stars aged around 100 million years. The position angle of the bar is estimated to be 22.48° ± 0.79°.
