= Rho Tucanae =

Binary star system in the southern constellation Tucana

ρ Tucanae
Observation data Epoch J2000.0 Equinox J2000.0 (ICRS)
- Constellation: Tucana
- Right ascension: 00^{h} 42^{m} 28.37188^{s}
- Declination: −65° 28′ 04.9066″
- Apparent magnitude (V): +5.38

Characteristics
- Evolutionary stage: main sequence
- Spectral type: F6 V
- U−B color index: +0.00
- B−V color index: +0.50

Astrometry
Radial velocity (R_{v})	33.962±0.796 km/s
Proper motion (μ)	RA: +53.444 mas/yr Dec.: +41.180 mas/yr
Parallax (π)	23.6721±0.0631 mas
Distance	137.8 ± 0.4 ly (42.2 ± 0.1 pc)
Absolute magnitude (M_{V})	+2.75

Orbit
Period (P)	4.8202 d
Eccentricity (e)	0.02
Periastron epoch (T)	2419299.11 JD
Semi-amplitude (K_{1}) (primary)	26.1 km/s

Details

ρ Tuc A
Mass	1.66 M_{☉}
Luminosity	9.7 L_{☉}
Surface gravity (log g)	3.64±0.11 cgs
Temperature	6,034±54 K
Metallicity [Fe/H]	−0.26 dex
Rotational velocity (v sin i)	23.5±1.2 km/s
Age	2.64 Gyr

ρ Tuc B
Mass	0.33 M_{☉}

Other designations
- ρ Tuc, CPD−66°47, FK5 2047, HD 4089, HIP 3330, HR 187, SAO 248237

Database references
SIMBAD	data

Rho Tucanae (ρ Tuc, ρ Tucanae) is a binary star system in the southern constellation of Tucana. It is visible to the naked eye with a combined apparent visual magnitude of +5.38. Based upon an annual parallax shift of 23.7 mas as seen from Earth, it is located 138 light years from the Sun.

This is a single-lined spectroscopic binary with a close, nearly circular orbit having a period of 4.82 days and an eccentricity of 0.02. The primary member, component A, is a yellow-white hued F-type main sequence star with a stellar classification of F6 V. It is around 2.6 billion years old and a member of the thin disk population. The primary has about 1.66 times the mass of the Sun while the secondary is just 0.33 times the Sun's mass.
