= NGC 7408 =

Galaxy in the constellation Tucana

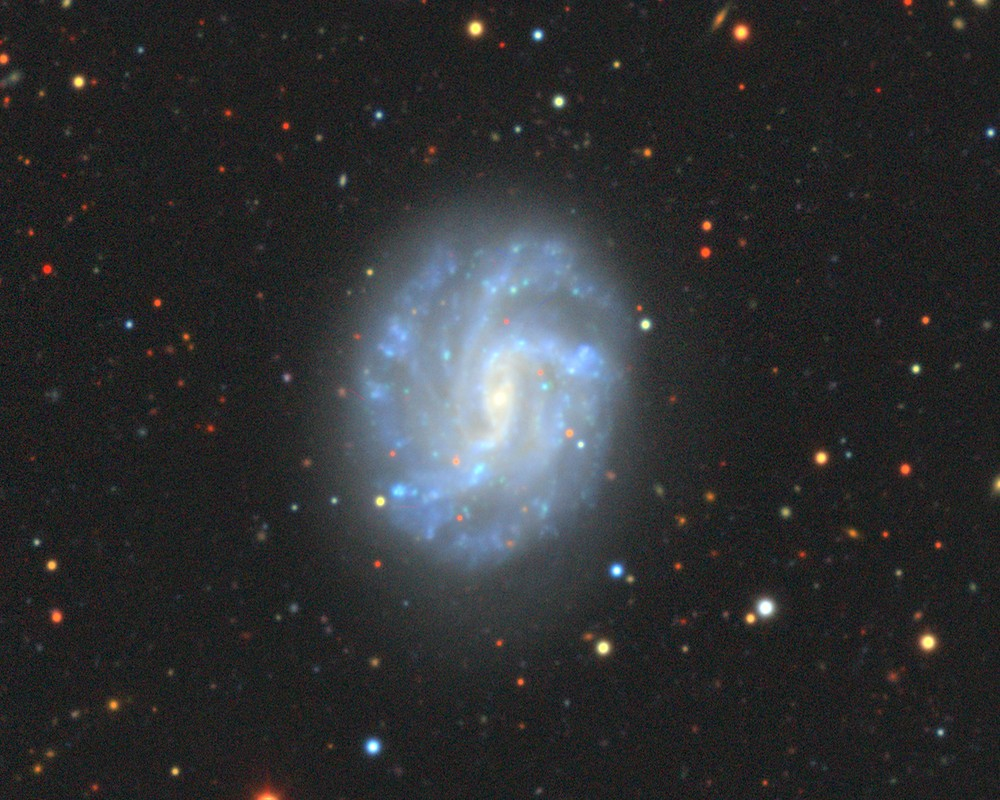
- NGC 7408 imaged by Legacy Surveys

Observation data (J2000 epoch)
- Constellation: Tucana
- Right ascension: 22^{h} 55^{m} 56.8877^{s}
- Declination: −63° 41′ 40.732″
- Redshift: 0.011656±0.0000310
- Heliocentric radial velocity: 3,494±9 km/s
- Distance: 142.80 ± 5.67 Mly (43.783 ± 1.739 Mpc)
- Group or cluster: NGC 7329 group (LGG 462)
- Apparent magnitude (V): 13.33

Characteristics
- Type: SB(s)cd
- Size: ~86,200 ly (26.42 kpc) (estimated)
- Apparent size (V): 1.5′ × 1.2′

Other designations
- ESO 109- G 026, IRAS 22527-6357, 2MASX J22555688-6341411, PGC 070037

NGC 7408 is a barred spiral galaxy in the constellation of Tucana. It has an apparent visual magnitude of 13.33 and an angular size of 1.5′ × 1.2′. Its velocity with respect to the cosmic microwave background is 3,372±13 km/s, which corresponds to a Hubble distance of 162.2 ± 11.4 Mly (49.73 ± 3.49 Mpc). However, 12 non-redshift measurements give a closer mean distance of 142.80 ± 5.67 Mly (43.783 ± 1.739 Mpc). It was discovered by British astronomer John Herschel on 1 November 1834.

The morphological classification of NGC 7408 is SB(s)cd, indicating a barred spiral form (SB) with no ring structure (s) and closely wound spiral arms (cd). It a Seyfert II galaxy, it has a quasar-like nucleus with very high surface brightness whose spectra reveal strong, high-ionisation emission lines, but unlike quasars, the host galaxy is clearly detectable.

== NGC 7329 group ==
NGC 7408 is a member of the NGC 7329 group (also known as LGG 462). This group contains at least 11 galaxies, including NGC 7329, NGC 7358, NGC 7417, IC 5222, IC 5227, IC 5244, IC 5250, IC 5266, IC 5272, and ESO 109-32.

== Supernovae ==
Two supernovae have been observed in NGC 7408:

- SN 2007bn (type unknown, mag. 17) was discovered by R. Martin and the Perth Observatory Automated Supernova Search on 18 April 2007.
- SN 2009bu (Type II-P, mag. 16.4) was discovered by Alessandro Dimai on 25 March 2009.

== See also ==
- List of NGC objects (7001–7840)
