= NGC 299 =

Open star cluster in the constellation Tucana

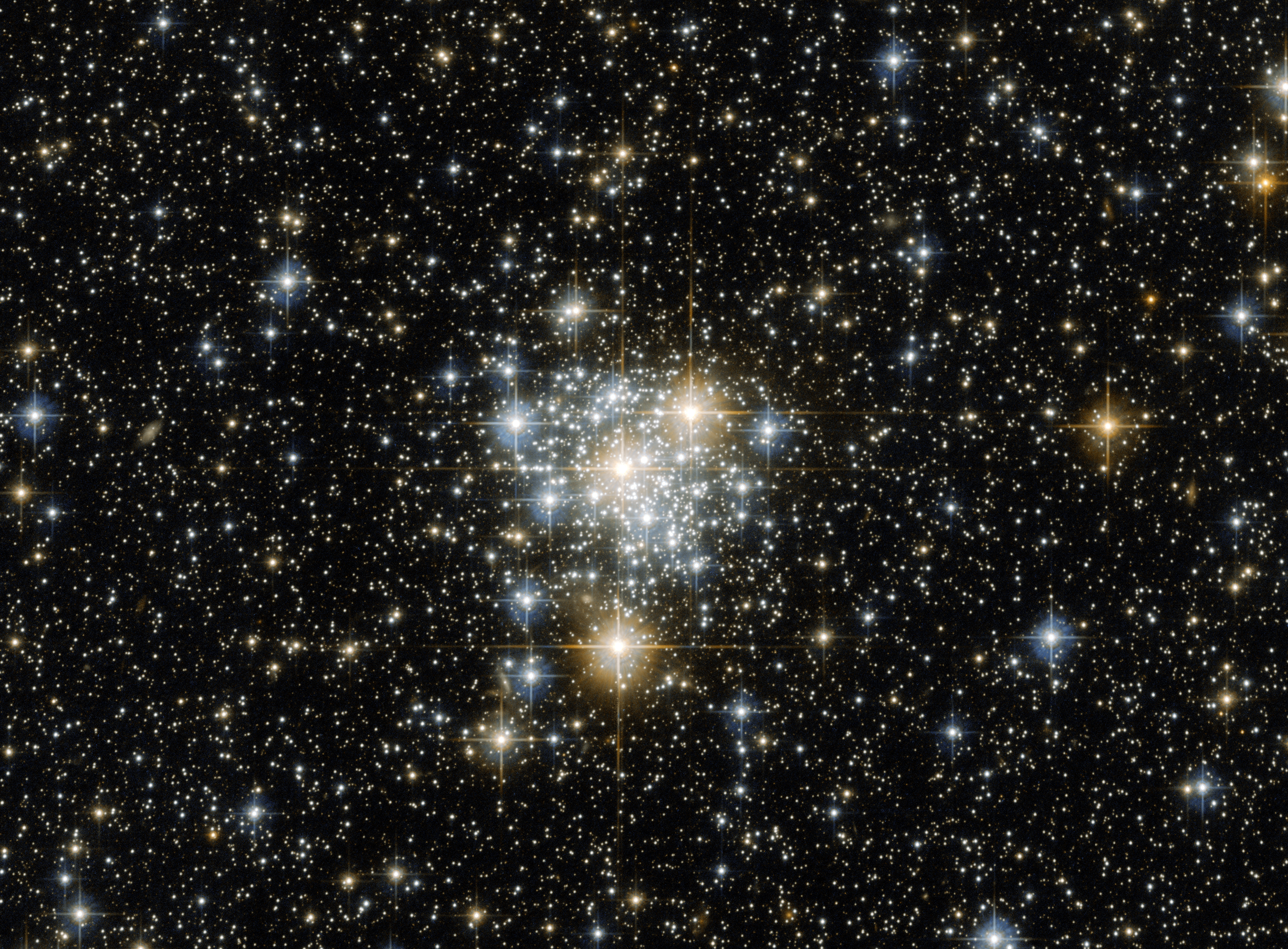
- Hubble Space Telescope image of the cluster NGC 299

Observation data (J2000 epoch)
- Right ascension: 00^{h} 53^{m} 24.74^{s}
- Declination: −72° 11′ 47.6″
- Distance: 200 kly
- Apparent magnitude (V): 11.73±0.12
- Apparent dimensions (V): 0.9' x 0.9'

Physical characteristics
- Mass: 600±200 M_{☉}
- Estimated age: 26+15 −9 Myr
- Other designations: ESO 051-SC 005.

Associations
- Constellation: Tucana

NGC 299 is an open cluster of stars in the main body of the Small Magellanic Cloud – a nearby dwarf galaxy. It is located in the southern constellation of Tucana, just under 200,000 light years distant from the Sun. The cluster was discovered on August 12, 1834, by English astronomer John Herschel.

The cluster is around 25 million years old with 600 times the mass of the Sun. It spans a radius of 24 ly (7.3 pc). The metallicity of the cluster, what astronomers term the abundance of elements more massive than helium, is almost identical to that of the Sun. The cluster is old enough that the stellar winds from the most massive members has dispersed all of the original dust and gas. Hence, star formation has come to a halt. Two eclipsing binaries and one probable Be star have been identified, but the cluster is lacking any low-amplitude pulsating variables.
