= Theta Tucanae =

Variable star in the constellation Tucana

θ Tucanae
- Location of θ Tucanae (circled in red)

Observation data Epoch J2000 Equinox ICRS
- Constellation: Tucana
- Right ascension: 00^{h} 33^{m} 23.35876^{s}
- Declination: −71° 15′ 58.4904″
- Apparent magnitude (V): +6.109

Characteristics
- Spectral type: A7IV
- U−B color index: +0.18
- B−V color index: +0.23
- Variable type: δ Sct

Astrometry
Radial velocity (R_{v})	2.3 ± 2 km/s
Proper motion (μ)	RA: 73.40 mas/yr Dec.: −13.42 mas/yr
Parallax (π)	7.69±0.22 mas
Distance	420 ± 10 ly (130 ± 4 pc)
Absolute magnitude (M_{V})	+0.54

Details
Mass	1.9–2.1 M_{☉}
Luminosity	20.2–25.1 L_{☉}
Surface gravity (log g)	3.818–3.923 cgs
Temperature	7500–7685 K
Age	0.69–1.04 Gyr

Other designations
- CPD−71°20, HD 3112, HIP 2629, HR 139, SAO 255679

Database references
SIMBAD	data

Theta Tucanae (θ Tuc, θ Tucanae) is a star in the constellation Tucana.

Like other stars in Tucana, it was given its Bayer designation by French explorer and astronomer Nicolas Louis de Lacaille in 1756. It was found to be variable in 1971.

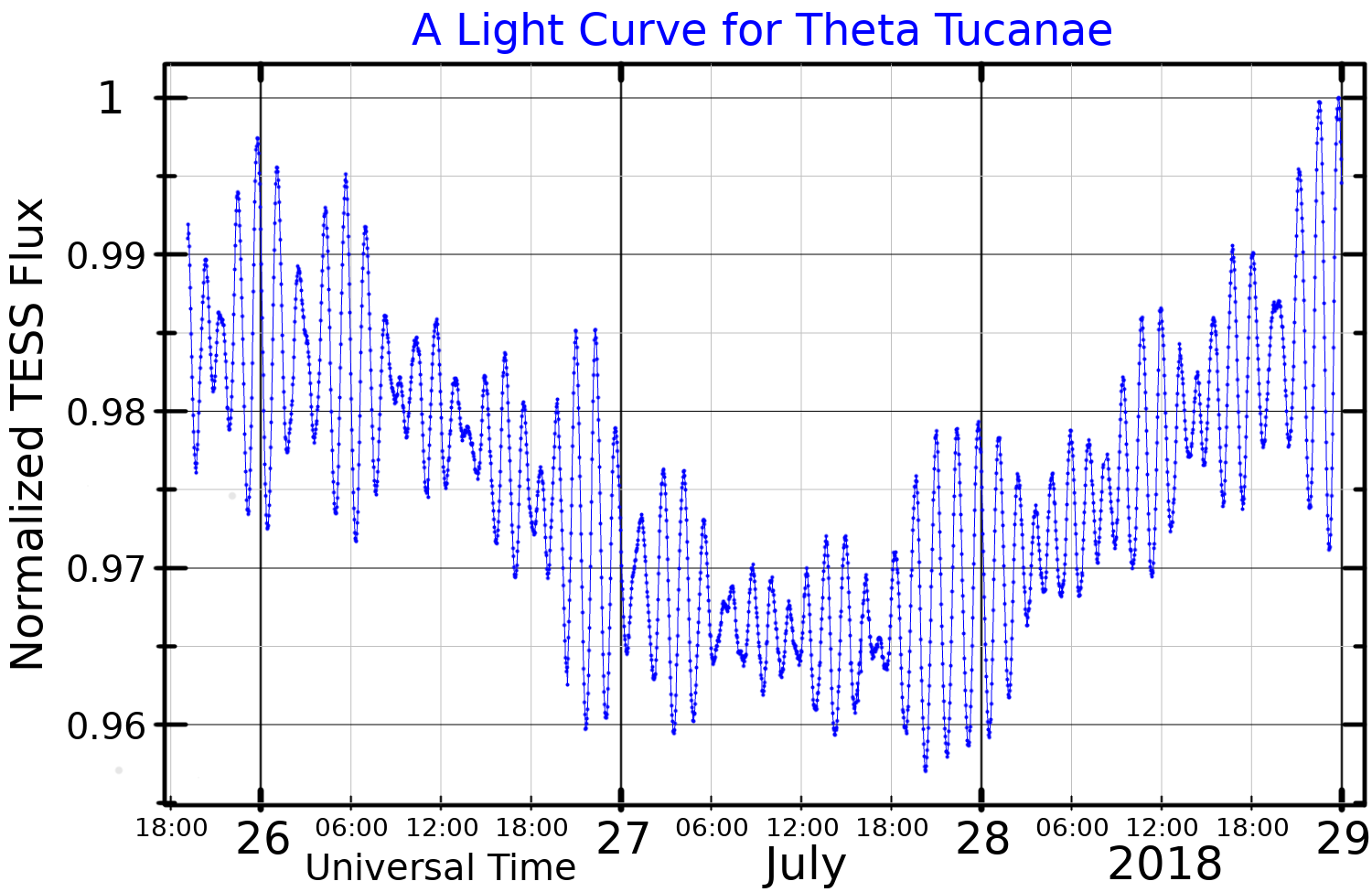
A light curve for Theta Tucanae, plotted from TESS data

Theta Tucanae is a white A-type subgiant of spectral type A7IV with a mean apparent magnitude of +6.11, located approximately 423 light years from Earth. It is classified as a Delta Scuti type variable star and its brightness varies from magnitude +6.06 to +6.15 with periods of around 70 to 80 minutes. The Delta Scuti variables are a class of short-period (six hours at most) pulsating stars that have been used as standard candles and as subjects to study astroseismology.

Observations over the decades have shown that its colour slightly changes and it exhibits variation in light that indicate the star is actually an ellipsoidal binary with a period of seven days. The system is more luminous than expected, given the spectrum and distance of the primary star, indicating that the companion star must be contributing a good proportion of its light. Stellar evolution modelling has concluded that the system likely begun as a binary system, with one star about double the Sun's mass and the other roughly equivalent to that of the sun. The larger star eventually aged and expanded as it used up its core hydrogen, and begun having its mass siphoned off by the smaller star; the system is likely to have been an Algol-type eclipsing binary at this stage. This star appears now to be an aged star composed mostly of helium with very little hydrogen and with a mass of 0.2 solar masses and around 37 times the luminosity of the Sun and surface temperature of 7000 K, while the once-smaller star is the Delta Scuti variable that is now around two solar masses. Around 0.8 solar masses has been lost from the system over time.
