= HD 215497 =

Star in the constellation Tucana

Observation data Epoch J2000.0 Equinox ICRS
- Constellation: Tucana
- Right ascension: 22^{h} 46^{m} 36.75396^{s}
- Declination: −56° 35′ 58.3285″
- Apparent magnitude (V): 8.96

Characteristics
- Spectral type: K3V
- Apparent magnitude (B): 9.913
- Apparent magnitude (J): 7.339±0.024
- Apparent magnitude (H): 6.917±0.053
- Apparent magnitude (K): 6.784±0.024
- B−V color index: 0.953±0.025

Astrometry
Radial velocity (R_{v})	+49.31 km/s
Proper motion (μ)	RA: −54.660±0.041 mas/yr Dec.: −61.028±0.045 mas/yr
Parallax (π)	24.6339±0.0324 mas
Distance	132.4 ± 0.2 ly (40.59 ± 0.05 pc)
Absolute magnitude (M_{V})	5.77

Details
Mass	0.86±0.02 M_{☉}
Radius	0.87±0.02 R_{☉}
Luminosity	0.47±0.02 L_{☉}
Surface gravity (log g)	4.49±0.03 cgs
Temperature	5,128±12 K
Metallicity [Fe/H]	0.23±0.07 dex
Rotational velocity (v sin i)	1.67 km/s
Age	9.9±2.8 Gyr

Other designations
- CPD−57°10139, HD 215497, HIP 112441, SAO 247578, PPM 350516, TYC 8826-00247-1, 2MASS J22463675-5635584

Database references
SIMBAD	data
Exoplanet Archive	data

HD 215497 is a single star in the southern constellation of Tucana. It has an orange hue with an apparent visual magnitude of 8.96, which is too dim to be viewed with the naked eye. A 2015 survey ruled out the existence of any stellar companions at projected distances from 26 to 300 astronomical units. Based on parallax measurements, it is located at a distance of 132 light years from the Sun. The star is drifting further away with a radial velocity of +49 km/s, having come as close as 45 light-years some 774,000 years ago. The absolute magnitude of this star is 5.77.

The stellar classification of HD 215497 is K3V, indicating this is a K-type main-sequence star that is generating energy through core hydrogen fusion. The star is about ten billion years old with a low magnetic activity level and is spinning with a projected rotational velocity of 1.67 km/s. It is smaller than the Sun, with 86% of the Sun's mass and 87% of the radius. This is a metal-rich star, which means the abundance of heavier elements in the atmosphere is significantly higher than in the Sun. It is radiating 47% of the luminosity of the Sun from its photosphere at an effective temperature of 5,128 K.

== Planetary system ==
Announced in 2009, two extrasolar planets were discovered to be orbiting the star. Both planets are less massive than Jupiter. The inner exoplanet HD 215497 b orbits very close to the star and is termed a "hot super-Earth". The outer exoplanet HD 215497 c is a giant planet that orbits a little bit further from the star than the Earth, at around 1.282 AU, with a high eccentricity. A check for transits of the inner planet did not reveal any passages.

The HD 215497 planetary system
Companion (in order from star)	Mass	Semimajor axis (AU)	Orbital period (days)	Eccentricity	Inclination (°)	Radius
b	≥6.6 M_{🜨}	0.047	3.93404 ± 0.00066	0.16 ± 0.09	—	—
c	≥0.33 M_{J}	1.282	567.94 ± 2.70	0.49 ± 0.04	—	—
