= Nu Tucanae =

Star in the constellation Tucana

- Location of ν Tucanae (circled in red)

Observation data Epoch J2000.0 Equinox J2000.0 (ICRS)
- Constellation: Tucana
- Right ascension: 22^{h} 33^{m} 00.06240^{s}
- Declination: −61° 58′ 55.6390″
- Apparent magnitude (V): 4.75 - 4.93

Characteristics
- Spectral type: M4 III
- U−B color index: +1.73
- B−V color index: +1.61
- Variable type: Lb:

Astrometry
Radial velocity (R_{v})	−3.4±0.8 km/s
Proper motion (μ)	RA: −3.40 mas/yr Dec.: −0.8 mas/yr
Parallax (π)	11.24±0.23 mas
Distance	290 ± 6 ly (89 ± 2 pc)
Absolute magnitude (M_{V})	+0.16

Details
Radius	64.37 R_{☉}
Luminosity	554±41 L_{☉}
Surface gravity (log g)	0.778 cgs
Temperature	3472±125 K

Other designations
- ν Tuc, CPD−62°6348, FK5 3803, HD 213442, HIP 111310, HR 8582, SAO 255247

Database references
SIMBAD	data

ν Tucanae, Latinized as Nu Tucanae, is a solitary, variable star in the southern constellation of Tucana. This red-hued object is visible to the naked eye as a faint star with an apparent visual magnitude that fluctuates around +4.80. It is located approximately 290 light years from the Sun based on parallax, but is drifting closer with a radial velocity of −3 km/s.

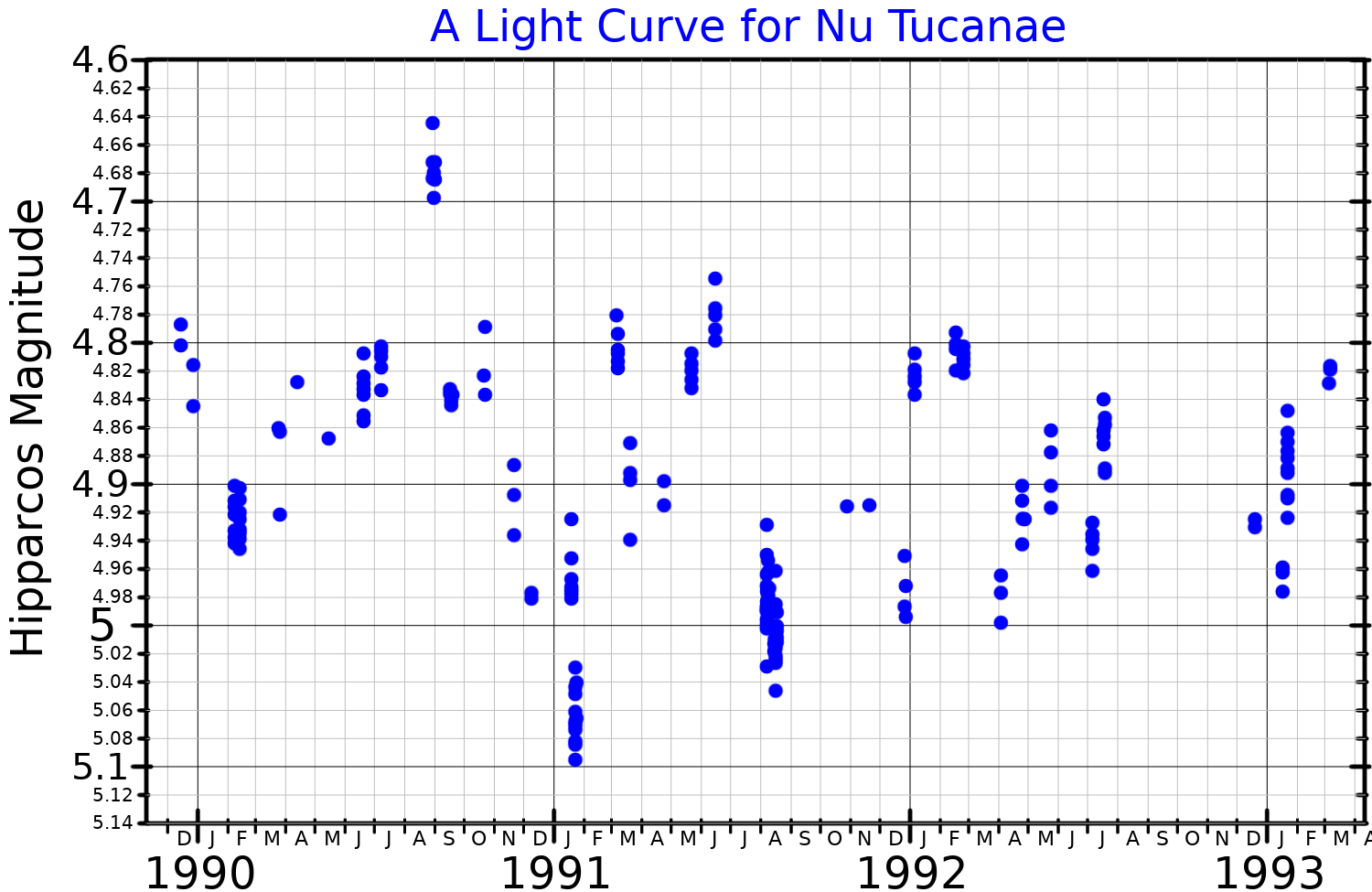
A light curve for Nu Tucanae, plotted from Hipparcos data

This object is an aging red giant with a stellar classification of M4 III, currently on the asymptotic giant branch. With the supply of hydrogen exhausted at its core, the star has cooled and expanded off the main sequence; at present it has 49 times the Sun's radius. It is classified as a slow irregular variable and its brightness varies from magnitude +4.75 to +4.93. Cyclical periods of 22.3, 24.4, 24.8, 25.1, 25.5, 33.8, 50.6, 80.1, 123.2, and 261.8 days have been reported for its variations. On average, the star is radiating around 400 times the luminosity of the Sun from its photosphere at an effective temperature of 3,674 K.
