= Kappa Tucanae =

Quintuple star system in the constellation Tucana

- Location of κ Tucanae (circled in red)

Observation data Epoch J2000.0 Equinox J2000.0 (ICRS)
- Constellation: Tucana
- κ Tuc A
- Right ascension: 01^{h} 15^{m} 46.0891^{s}
- Declination: −68° 52′ 33.401″
- Apparent magnitude (V): 4.88
- κ Tuc B
- Right ascension: 01^{h} 15^{m} 46.5740^{s}
- Declination: −68° 52′ 33.516″
- Apparent magnitude (V): 7.54
- κ Tuc C
- Right ascension: 01^{h} 15^{m} 01.0248^{s}
- Declination: −68° 49′ 08.374″
- Apparent magnitude (V): 7.76
- κ Tuc D
- Right ascension: 01^{h} 15^{m} 00.7519^{s}
- Declination: −68° 49′ 07.791″
- Apparent magnitude (V): 8.26

Characteristics
- Evolutionary stage: Aa: subgiant Others: main sequence
- Spectral type: Aa: F6IV; Ab: M3.5V/M4.5V; B: G5V; C: K2V; D: K3V
- B−V color index: 0.48

Astrometry

AB
| Radial velocity (R_{v}) | +7.7±1.7 km/s |
| Proper motion (μ) | RA: +386.257 mas/yr Dec.: +82.069 mas/yr |
| Parallax (π) | 47.6500±0.0203 mas |
| Distance | 68.45 ± 0.03 ly (20.986 ± 0.009 pc) |
| Absolute magnitude (M_{V}) | 3.50 |

Orbit
| Primary | κ Tuc Aa |
| Name | κ Tuc Ab |
| Period (P) | 8.14+0.11 −0.10 years |
| Semi-major axis (a) | 4.822+0.077 −0.071 AU |
| Eccentricity (e) | 0.9356±0.0024 |
| Inclination (i) | 126.13±0.80° |
| Longitude of the node (Ω) | 189.0+1.1 −1.0° |
| Periastron epoch (T) | 60,219.8±1.8 MJD |
| Argument of periastron (ω) (secondary) | 180.0+1.5 −1.4° |
| Semi-amplitude (K_{1}) (primary) | 8 km/s |

Orbit
| Primary | κ Tuc A |
| Name | κ Tuc B |
| Period (P) | 1,122±28 years |
| Semi-major axis (a) | 7.03±0.07″ |
| Eccentricity (e) | 0.40 |
| Inclination (i) | 128.5±1.1° |
| Longitude of the node (Ω) | 323.1±0.5° |
| Periastron epoch (T) | 2086.7±4.1 |
| Argument of periastron (ω) (secondary) | 61.3±1.6° |

Orbit
| Primary | κ Tuc C |
| Name | κ Tuc D |
| Period (P) | 85.12±0.11 years |
| Semi-major axis (a) | 1.094±0.007″ |
| Eccentricity (e) | 0.039±0.002 |
| Inclination (i) | 31.3±0.5° |
| Longitude of the node (Ω) | 141.0±0.9° |
| Periastron epoch (T) | 1916.92±1.20 |
| Argument of periastron (ω) (secondary) | 135.7±4.6° |

Details

κ Tuc Aa
| Mass | 1.37+0.06 −0.04 M_{☉} |
| Radius | 1.71±0.05 R_{☉} |
| Luminosity | 4.59±0.31 L_{☉} |
| Temperature | 6,457+57 −66 K |
| Rotational velocity (v sin i) | 61.1±3.1 km/s |
| Age | 2.28+0.43 −0.42 Gyr |

κ Tuc Ab
| Mass | 0.33±0.10 M_{☉} |
| Age | ~2 Gyr |

κ Tuc B
| Mass | 0.88 M_{☉} |
| Radius | 0.831±0.050 R_{☉} |
| Luminosity | 0.421±0.010 L_{☉} |
| Surface gravity (log g) | 4.53±0.08 cgs |
| Temperature | 5,145 K |
| Age | ~2 Gyr |

κ Tuc C
| Mass | 0.86 M_{☉} |
| Radius | 0.93±0.07 R_{☉} |
| Luminosity | 0.387±0.009 L_{☉} |
| Temperature | 5,062 K |
| Age | ~2 Gyr |

κ Tuc D
| Mass | 0.80 M_{☉} |
| Radius | 0.71±0.05 R_{☉} |
| Luminosity | 0.239±0.007 L_{☉} |
| Temperature | 4,850 K |
| Age | ~2 Gyr |

Other designations
- κ Tuc, WDS J01158-6853
- AB: CD−69°52, GJ 55.3, GJ 9049, HD 7788, HIP 5896, HR 377, SAO 248346
- CD: CD−69°51, GJ 55.1, HD 7693, HIP 5842, SAO 248342

Database references
| SIMBAD | A |
- B
- CD
- C
- D

Kappa Tucanae, Latinised from κ Tucanae, is a quintuple star system in the southern constellation Tucana. It is visible to the naked eye as a faint point of light with a combined apparent visual magnitude of +4.86. The system is located approximately 68 light years from the Sun based on parallax, and is drifting further away with a radial velocity of +8 km/s.

Temporally variable excess emission, likely originating from hot exozodiacal dust, has been detected around Kappa Tucanae A.

== Characteristics ==
Aa
Period = 8.14 yr
Ab
Period = 1122 yr
B
318″ separation
C
Period = 85.12 yr
D

Hierarchy of orbits in the κ Tucanae system

The Kappa Tucanae system consists of five stars in a complex, hierarchical architecture, with nested orbits. The system consists of two sets of stars separated by 318 arcseconds, which corresponds to a projected separation of 6,700 astronomical units. The estimated orbital period is 300,000 years.

The first set contains three stars. The primary star, Kappa Tucanae Aa, is an F-type subgiant with an apparent magnitude of 4.88. It forms an astrometric binary with Kappa Tucanae Ab, which is a red dwarf with an orbital period of 8.14 years and a mass of 0.33 solar masses, being too faint to be detected using photometry. This inner system is orbited by the magnitude 7.54 Kappa Tucanae B, a G-type main-sequence star that completes an orbit around the inner pair every 1,122 years.

The second set of stars consists of the magnitude +7.76 C, and the magnitude +8.26 D; both are K-type main-sequence stars that orbit around each other once every 85.12 years.

== Exozodiacal dust ==
Excess emission in near-infrared was detected around the primary star of the system, Kappa Tucanae A, and was interpreted as hot exozodiacal dust. This excess emission is variable in time, dimming below detection limit and re-appearing on timescales of a year. Spectral energy distribution modelling suggests that Kappa Tucanae's exozodical dust may consist of amorphous carbon, though other forms of carbon or silicates cannot be ruled out. The best fit model of the exozodi is a narrow ring of hot dust located between 0.1 and 0.29 au, with temperatures between 940 and 1,430 K (667 and 1,160 °C; 1,230 and 2,110 °F). The paper rejects a stellar companion as the source of the excess emission.

The periastron of the companion star Kappa Tucanae Ab coincides with the location of the hot exozodi dust. The star could interact with the dust through gravity, irradiation, or stellar wind.
