= Gamma Tucanae =

Star in the constellation Tucana

γ Tucanae
- Location of γ Tucanae (circled)

Observation data Epoch J2000 Equinox ICRS
- Constellation: Tucana
- Right ascension: 23^{h} 17^{m} 25.77222^{s}
- Declination: −58° 14′ 08.6287″
- Apparent magnitude (V): +3.99

Characteristics
- Evolutionary stage: main sequence
- Spectral type: F1 III or F3 IV/V or F4 V
- U−B color index: −0.02
- B−V color index: +0.39

Astrometry
Radial velocity (R_{v})	+18.4±0.7 km/s
Proper motion (μ)	RA: −35.83 mas/yr Dec.: +81.16 mas/yr
Parallax (π)	43.37±0.63 mas
Distance	75 ± 1 ly (23.1 ± 0.3 pc)
Absolute magnitude (M_{V})	2.18

Details
Mass	1.55 M_{☉}
Radius	2.2 R_{☉}
Luminosity	11.33 L_{☉}
Surface gravity (log g)	3.92 cgs
Temperature	6,679 K
Metallicity [Fe/H]	−0.22 dex
Rotational velocity (v sin i)	94 km/s
Age	1.414 Gyr

Other designations
- γ Tuc, CPD−58°8062, FK5 877, GC 32413, GJ 9818, HD 219571, HIP 114996, HR 8848, SAO 247814, GSC 08837-01297

Database references
SIMBAD	data

Gamma Tucanae, Latinized from γ Tucanae, is a star in the constellation Tucana, marking the toucan's beak. It is faintly visible to the naked eye with an apparent visual magnitude of +3.99. Based upon an annual parallax shift of 43.37 mas as seen from Earth, this star is located about 75 light years from the Sun. It is moving away from the Sun with a radial velocity of +18 km/s.

There is disagreement in the literature as to the stellar classification of this star. Malaroda (1975) has it catalogued as F1 III, which would suggest it is an evolved F-type giant star. Houk (1979) listed it as F3 IV/V, which appears to indicate a less evolved F-type star transitioning between the main sequence and subgiant star. Gray et al. (2006) has it classed as F4 V, which would match an ordinary F-type main-sequence star.

This star is a suspected astrometric binary. The visible component has 1.55 times the mass of the Sun and 2.2 times the Sun's radius. At the age of around 1.4 billion years, it retains a relatively high rate of spin with a projected rotational velocity of 94 km/s. It is radiating 11 times the Sun's luminosity from its photosphere at an effective temperature of 6,679 K.

Gamma Tucanae may (95% chance) have a distant co-moving companion – a magnitude 6.64 G-type main-sequence star of class G0 V designated HD 223913. This object has the same mass as the Sun and is separated from Gamma Tucanae by about 11 ly (3.5 pc).
