= Alpha Tucanae =

Binary star system in the constellation Tucana

α Tucanae
- Location of α Tucanae (circled)

Observation data Epoch J2000 Equinox ICRS
- Constellation: Tucana
- Right ascension: 22^{h} 18^{m} 30.11244^{s}
- Declination: −60° 15′ 34.6664″
- Apparent magnitude (V): 2.86

Characteristics
- Spectral type: K3 III
- U−B color index: +1.54
- B−V color index: +1.39

Astrometry
Radial velocity (R_{v})	+45.8 km/s
Proper motion (μ)	RA: −77.000 mas/yr Dec.: −32.823 mas/yr
Parallax (π)	17.7324±0.3290 mas
Distance	184 ± 3 ly (56 ± 1 pc)
Absolute magnitude (M_{V})	−1.05
Absolute bolometric magnitude (M_{bol})	−1.97

Orbit
Period (P)	4197.7 days
Eccentricity (e)	0.39
Periastron epoch (T)	18666.4
Argument of periastron (ω) (secondary)	48.5°
Semi-amplitude (K_{1}) (primary)	7.2 km/s

Details
Mass	2.5 - 3 M_{☉}
Radius	37.3 R_{☉}
Luminosity	424 L_{☉}
Temperature	4310 K

Other designations
- Lang-Exster, α Tuc, CPD−60°7561, FK5 841, HD 211416, HIP 110130, HR 8502, SAO 255193

Database references
SIMBAD	data

Alpha Tucanae (α Tuc, α Tucanae), also named Lang-Exster, is a binary star system in the southern circumpolar constellation of Tucana. With an apparent visual magnitude of 2.86, it can be seen with the naked eye from the Southern Hemisphere. Using parallax measurements, the distance to this system can be estimated as 184 light-years (56 parsecs). A cool star with a surface temperature of 4300 K, it is 424 times as luminous as the sun and 37 times its diameter. It is 2.5 to 3 times as massive. It is unclear what stage of evolution the star is in.

This is a spectroscopic binary, which means that the two stars have not been individually resolved using a telescope, but the presence of the companion has been inferred from measuring changes in the spectrum of the primary. The orbital period of the binary system is 4197.7 days (11.5 years). The primary component has a stellar classification of K3 III, which indicates it is a giant star that has exhausted the supply of hydrogen at its core and evolved away from the main sequence. It has the characteristic orange hue of a K-type star.

The IAU Working Group on Star Names approved the name Lang-Exster for this star system on 19 September 2024 and it is now so entered in the IAU Catalog of Star Names. "Lang" is a Malay and Indonesian word meaning hornbill, and "Exster" is a Dutch word meaning magpie; both were historically used as names for the constellation Tucana. Since this star is a binary system it is given a double name; the names can refer individually to the two components.
