= Delta Tucanae =

Star in the constellation Tucana

- Location of δ Tucanae (circled in red)

Observation data Epoch J2000.0 Equinox J2000.0 (ICRS)
- Constellation: Tucana
- Right ascension: 22^{h} 27^{m} 19.96745^{s}
- Declination: −64° 57′ 58.8775″
- Apparent magnitude (V): +4.48 (A: 4.52, B: 8.85)

Characteristics
- Spectral type: B9 Vn + G0 V Fe−2
- U−B color index: A: −0.07, B: −0.02
- B−V color index: A: −0.02, B: +0.51

Astrometry
Proper motion (μ)	RA: +68.45 mas/yr Dec.: +10.06 mas/yr
Parallax (π)	13.00±0.48 mas
Distance	251 ± 9 ly (77 ± 3 pc)
Absolute magnitude (M_{V})	A: 0.20, B: 4.50

Details

δ Tuc A
Mass	2.99 M_{☉}
Radius	2.7 R_{☉}
Surface gravity (log g)	4.11±0.14 cgs
Temperature	11,271±383 K
Rotation	2.8535 d
Rotational velocity (v sin i)	224 km/s
Age	232 Myr

Other designations
- δ Tuc, CPD−65°4044, HD 212581, HIP 110838, HR 8540, SAO 255222, WDS J22273-6458AB

Database references
SIMBAD	data

Delta Tucanae (δ Tuc, δ Tucanae) is a common proper motion pair of stars located in the southwestern corner of the southern constellation of Tucana. Based upon an annual parallax shift of 13.00 mas as seen from Earth, is approximately 250 light years from the Sun. It is visible to the naked eye with a combined apparent visual magnitude of +4.48. As of 2013, the two components had an angular separation of 7.0 arc seconds along a position angle of 282°.

The brighter primary, component A, is blue-white hued star a visual magnitude of 4.52. It is a B-type main-sequence star with a stellar classification of B9 Vn, where the 'n' suffix indicates "nebulous" absorption lines due to the star's rotation. It is spinning rapidly with a projected rotational velocity of 224 km/s, which is giving the star an oblate shape with an equatorial bulge that is an estimated 12% larger than the polar radius. The star has about three times the mass of the Sun and is around 232 million years old.

The magnitude 8.85 companion, component B, is a G-type main-sequence star. It has a classification of G0 V Fe−2, with the suffix indicating an underabundance of iron in the star's photosphere.
