= Beta Tucanae =

Star system in the constellation Tucana

β^{1, 2} Tucanae
- Location of β Tucanae group.

Observation data Epoch J2000 Equinox ICRS
- Constellation: Tucana
- β^{1} Tuc (β Tuc AB)
- Right ascension: 00^{h} 31^{m} 32.6709^{s}
- Declination: −62° 57′ 29.587″
- Apparent magnitude (V): +4.37
- β^{2} Tuc (β Tuc CD)
- Right ascension: 00^{h} 31^{m} 33.4223^{s}
- Declination: −62° 57′ 56.134″
- Apparent magnitude (V): +4.54

Characteristics

β^{1} Tuc
- Spectral type: B9V

β^{2} Tuc
- Spectral type: A2V + A7V

Astrometry

β^{1} Tuc
Parallax (π)	23.2596±0.2471 mas
Distance	140 ± 1 ly (43.0 ± 0.5 pc)

β^{2} Tuc
Parallax (π)	19.5923±0.9674 mas
Distance	166 ± 8 ly (51 ± 3 pc)

Details

β Tuc A
Mass	3.84 M_{☉}
Radius	2.73 R_{☉}
Luminosity	39 L_{☉}
Surface gravity (log g)	4.37 cgs
Temperature	10,726 K
Rotational velocity (v sin i)	170 km/s

β Tuc B
Mass	0.40 M_{☉}

β Tuc Ca
Mass	2.0 M_{☉}
Radius	1.6 R_{☉}
Temperature	9,200 K

β Tuc Cb
Mass	1.45 M_{☉}
Radius	1.4 R_{☉}
Temperature	7,000 K

β Tuc D
Mass	1.45 M_{☉}
Radius	1.4 R_{☉}
Temperature	7,000 K

Other designations
- β Tuc, CPD−63°50, GC 625, HR 126, CCDM 00316-6258
- β^{1}: HD 2884, HIP 2484, SAO 248201
- β^{2}: HD 2885, HIP 2487, SAO 248202

Database references
- β^{1}
- β^{2}

Beta Tucanae, Latinized from β Tucanae, is a group of six stars which appear to be at least loosely bound into a system in the constellation Tucana. Three of the stars are luminous and distinct enough to have been given their own Bayer designations, β^{1} Tucanae through β^{3} Tucanae. The system is approximately 140 light years from Earth.

== β^{1, 2} Tucanae ==
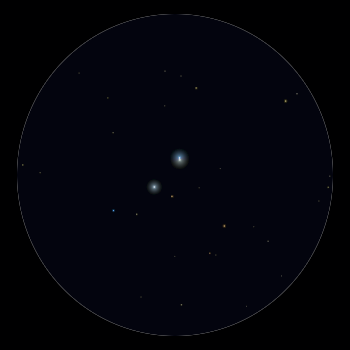
Simulated image of the β Tucanae system

The two brightest stars, Beta^{1} Tucanae and Beta^{2} Tucanae, also referred to as Beta Tucanae A (or AB) and Beta Tucanae C (or CD), are 27 arcseconds, or at least 1100 astronomical units (AU) apart. They are both main sequence dwarfs, Beta^{1} a blue-white B-type star with an apparent magnitude of +4.36, and Beta^{2} a white A-type star with an apparent magnitude of +4.53.

Beta^{1} Tucane is a binary while Beta^{2} is a trinary. Beta Tucanae^{1} B is a magnitude +13.5 star which is a close companion to Beta^{1}, being 2.4 arcseconds, or at least 100 AU away. Beta Tucanae C is a close binary of components Ca and Cb, separated by 0.6 AU. The 6th magnitude Beta Tucanae D, is another A-type star which is separated by approximately 0.38 arcseconds (16 AU) from Beta Tucanae C.

β1 A
Sep = ~100 au
β1 B
Sep = ~1,200 au
β2 Ca
Sep = 0.59 au
β2 Cb
Sep = 22 au
β2 D
Sep = ~23,000 au
β3

Hierarchy of orbits in the β Tucanae system

== β^{3} Tucanae ==
β^{3} Tucanae
Observation data Epoch J2000 Equinox ICRS
- Constellation: Tucana
- Right ascension: 00^{h} 32^{m} 43.905^{s}
- Declination: −63° 01′ 53.40″
- Apparent magnitude (V): +5.09

Characteristics
- Spectral type: A0V

Astrometry
Radial velocity (R_{v})	3.60 km/s
Proper motion (μ)	RA: +86.541 mas/yr Dec.: −50.115 mas/yr
Parallax (π)	21.6794±0.0683 mas
Distance	150.4 ± 0.5 ly (46.1 ± 0.1 pc)
Absolute magnitude (M_{V})	+1.8

Details
Mass	2.0 M_{☉}
Radius	1.7 R_{☉}
Luminosity	19 L_{☉}
Surface gravity (log g)	4.14 cgs
Temperature	9,275 K
Metallicity [Fe/H]	0.17 dex
Rotational velocity (v sin i)	100 km/s

Other designations
- CPD−63°52, GC 651, HD 3003, HIP 2578, HR 136, SAO 248208, CCDM 00327-6302

Database references
SIMBAD	data

Beta^{3} Tucanae is a suspected binary star which is separated from Beta^{1} and Beta^{2} Tucanae by 9 arcminutes on the sky, which puts the two systems at least 23 000 astronomical units (AU) or 0.37 light years apart. It is not clear how tightly Beta^{3} Tucanae is gravitationally bound to the rest of the β Tucanae system, but all the stars have similar distances from Earth and have the same proper motion on the sky, indicating they are gravitationally influencing each other to some degree.

In 1926, Beta^{3} Tucanae was reported to be a binary, with two components of magnitudes 5.7 and 6.1 separated by 0.1″, although more recent observations could not confirm this. At the separation of 0.1″ they would be separated by at least 4 au.

Beta^{3} Tucanae has an infrared excess, suggesting the presence a debris disk around the primary star.
