= Epsilon Tucanae =

Star in the constellation Tucana

- Location of ε Tucanae (circled in red)

Observation data Epoch J2000.0 Equinox J2000.0 (ICRS)
- Constellation: Tucana
- Right ascension: 23^{h} 59^{m} 54.97761^{s}
- Declination: −65° 34′ 37.6804″
- Apparent magnitude (V): +4.50

Characteristics
- Evolutionary stage: main sequence
- Spectral type: B8 V or B9 IV
- U−B color index: −0.28
- B−V color index: −0.08

Astrometry
Radial velocity (R_{v})	+8.8±2.8 km/s
Proper motion (μ)	RA: +47.93 mas/yr Dec.: −22.95 mas/yr
Parallax (π)	8.74±0.18 mas
Distance	373 ± 8 ly (114 ± 2 pc)
Absolute magnitude (M_{V})	−0.80

Details
Mass	4.00±0.20 M_{☉}
Luminosity	389 L_{☉}
Surface gravity (log g)	3.9±0.1 cgs
Temperature	13,000±500 K
Rotation	0.79318(8) d
Rotational velocity (v sin i)	300±20 km/s
Age	123 Myr

Other designations
- ε Tuc, CPD−66°3819, FK5 903, HD 224686, HIP 118322, HR 9076, SAO 255619

Database references
SIMBAD	data

Epsilon Tucanae (ε Tuc, ε Tucanae) is a solitary star in the southern constellation of Tucana. With an apparent visual magnitude of +4.50, it is faintly visible to the naked eye. Based upon an annual parallax shift of 8.74 mas as seen from Earth, it is located around 373 light years from the Sun.

Levenhagen and Leister (2008) classified this star as B8 V, indicating a blue-white hued B-type main sequence star. However, Hiltner, Garrison, and Schild (1969) listed it with a classification of B9 IV, suggesting it may be a more evolved subgiant star. It is a rapidly rotating Be star that is an estimated 78% of the way through its main sequence lifetime. The projected rotational velocity is 300 km/s, which is giving it an oblate shape with an equatorial bulge that is an estimated 36% larger than the polar radius. It has a weak magnetic field with a strength of 74±24 G.

It is the last star in the Hipparcos catalogue, HIP 118322, from the Hipparcos (1989–1993) astrometry satellite.
