= Zeta Tucanae =

Star in the constellation Tucana

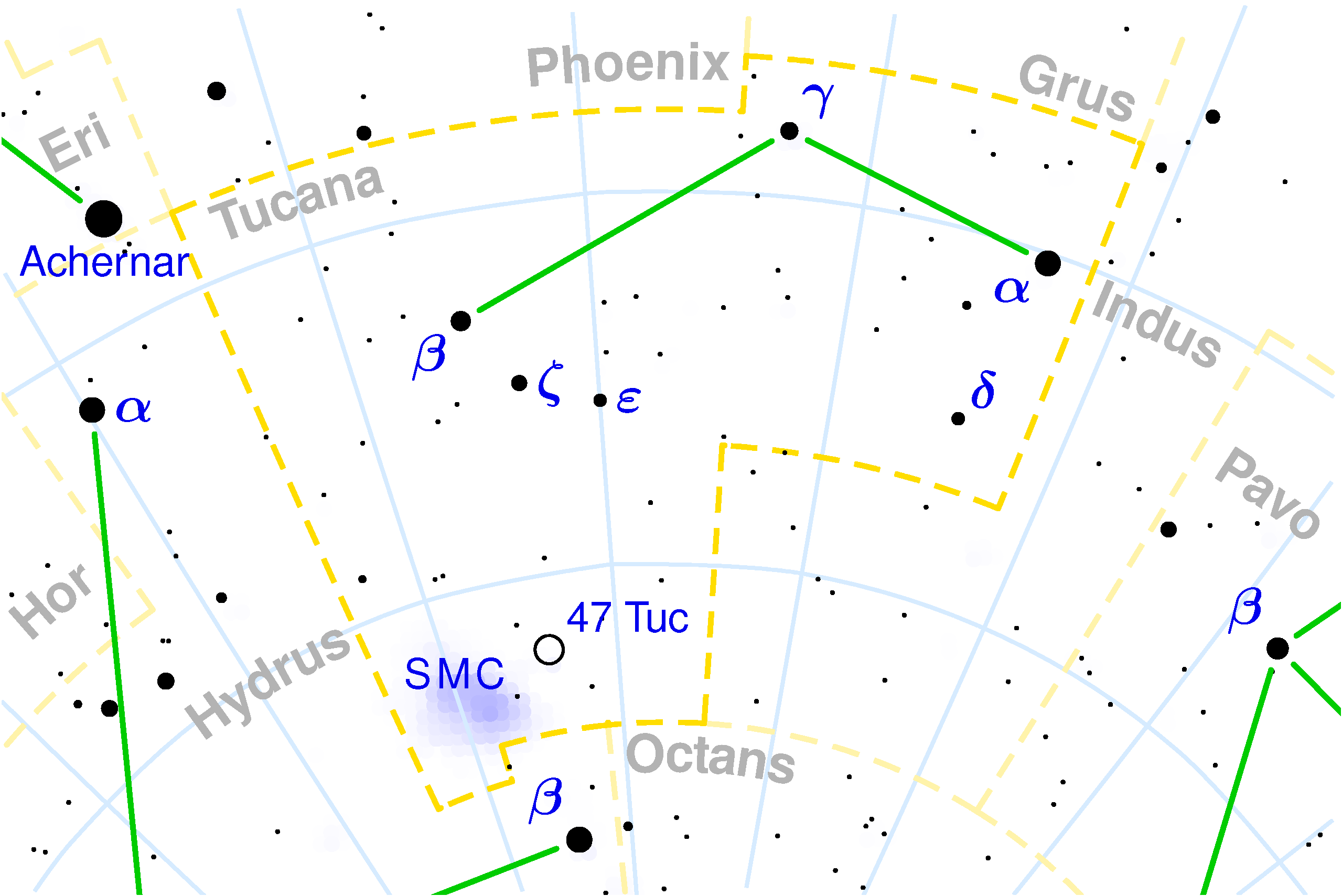
- Location of ζ Tucanae (near center).

Observation data Epoch J2000 Equinox ICRS
- Constellation: Tucana
- Right ascension: 00^{h} 20^{m} 04.2586^{s}
- Declination: −64° 52′ 29.257″
- Apparent magnitude (V): 4.23

Characteristics
- Evolutionary stage: main sequence
- Spectral type: F9.5 V
- U−B color index: 0.02
- B−V color index: 0.58
- Variable type: None

Astrometry
Radial velocity (R_{v})	9.280±0.0003 km/s
Proper motion (μ)	RA: 1706.747±0.162 mas/yr Dec.: 1164.959±0.156 mas/yr
Parallax (π)	116.1826±0.1334 mas
Distance	28.07 ± 0.03 ly (8.607 ± 0.010 pc)
Absolute magnitude (M_{V})	4.67

Details
Mass	0.985±0.033 M_{☉}
Radius	1.044±0.010 R_{☉}
Luminosity	1.232±0.039 L_{☉}
Surface gravity (log g)	4.394±0.007 cgs
Temperature	5,924±130 K
Metallicity [Fe/H]	−0.21±0.09 dex
Rotation	15.6534±0.0066 days
Rotational velocity (v sin i)	3.295±0.259 km/s
Age	5.3±0.5 Gyr

Other designations
- ζ Tuc, FK5 10, GC 401, GJ 17, HD 1581, HIP 1599, HR 77, SAO 248163, LHS 5, LTT 167

Database references
SIMBAD	data

Zeta Tucanae, Latinized from ζ Tucanae, is a star in the constellation Tucana. It is a spectral class F9.5 main sequence star. Based upon parallax measurements by the Hipparcos spacecraft, it is approximately 28.0 light years from Earth. This is one of the least variable stars observed during the Hipparcos mission. The star is faintly visible to the naked eye, at an apparent magnitude of +4.23.

== Characteristics ==
Zeta Tucanae is a solar-type star, with similar mass, radius, luminosity, and effective temperature as the Sun, and has an estimated age of 5.3 billion years. Despite having a slightly lower mass, this star is more luminous than the Sun. It is slightly metal-poor, which means the portion of elements heavier than helium is smaller relative to the Sun. The solar-like qualities make it a target of interest for investigating the possible existence of a life-bearing planet.

Zeta Tucanae has a rotation period of 15.65 days, and possesses a magnetic activity cycle with period of approximately 950 days.

The components of this star's space velocity are U = −60, V = −4 and W = −38 km/s. These correspond to the velocity toward the Galactic Center, the velocity along the direction of galactic rotation, and the velocity toward the north galactic pole, respectively. It is orbiting through the galaxy at a mean distance of 8.4 kpc from the Galactic Center and with an orbital eccentricity of 0.16.

Based upon an excess emission of infrared radiation at 70 micrometres, this system is believed to have a debris disk. It is radiating with a maximum temperature of 218 K, corresponding to a minimum distance from the star of 2.3 astronomical units.

As of 2025, no planet has been discovered in orbit around this star.

== See also ==
- List of star systems within 25–30 light-years
