= Tucana =

Constellation in the southern celestial hemisphere

- Constellation
- List of stars in Tucana
- Abbreviation: Tuc
- Genitive: Tucanae
- Pronunciation: /tjuːˈkeɪnə/, genitive /-ni/
- Symbolism: the toucan
- Right ascension: 22^{h} 08.45^{m} –01^{h} 24.82^{m}
- Declination: −56.31°–−75.35°
- Quadrant: SQ1
- Area: 295 sq. deg. (48th)
- Main stars: 3
- Bayer/Flamsteed stars: 17
- Stars brighter than 3.00^{m}: 1
- Stars within 10.00 pc (32.62 ly): 2 (Note: These are Zeta Tucanae and Gliese 54.)
- Brightest star: α Tuc (Lang-Exster) (2.87^{m})
- Nearest star: Gliese 54
- Messier objects: 0
- Bordering constellations: Grus; Indus; Octans; Hydrus; Eridanus (corner); Phoenix
- Visible at latitudes between +15° and −90°. Best visible at 21:00 (9 p.m.) during the month of October.

Tucana (The Toucan) is a constellation in the southern sky, named after the toucan, a South American bird. It is one of twelve constellations conceived in the late sixteenth century by Petrus Plancius from the observations of Pieter Dirkszoon Keyser and Frederick de Houtman. Tucana first appeared on a 35-centimetre-diameter (14 in) celestial globe published in 1598 in Amsterdam by Plancius and Jodocus Hondius and was depicted in Johann Bayer's star atlas Uranometria of 1603. French explorer and astronomer Nicolas Louis de Lacaille gave its stars Bayer designations in 1756. The constellations Tucana, Grus, Phoenix and Pavo are collectively known as the "Southern Birds".

Tucana is not a prominent constellation as all of its stars are third magnitude or fainter; the brightest is Alpha Tucanae with an apparent visual magnitude of 2.87. Beta Tucanae is a star system with six member stars, while Kappa is a quadruple system. The constellation contains 47 Tucanae, one of the brightest globular clusters in the sky, and most of the Small Magellanic Cloud.

== History ==
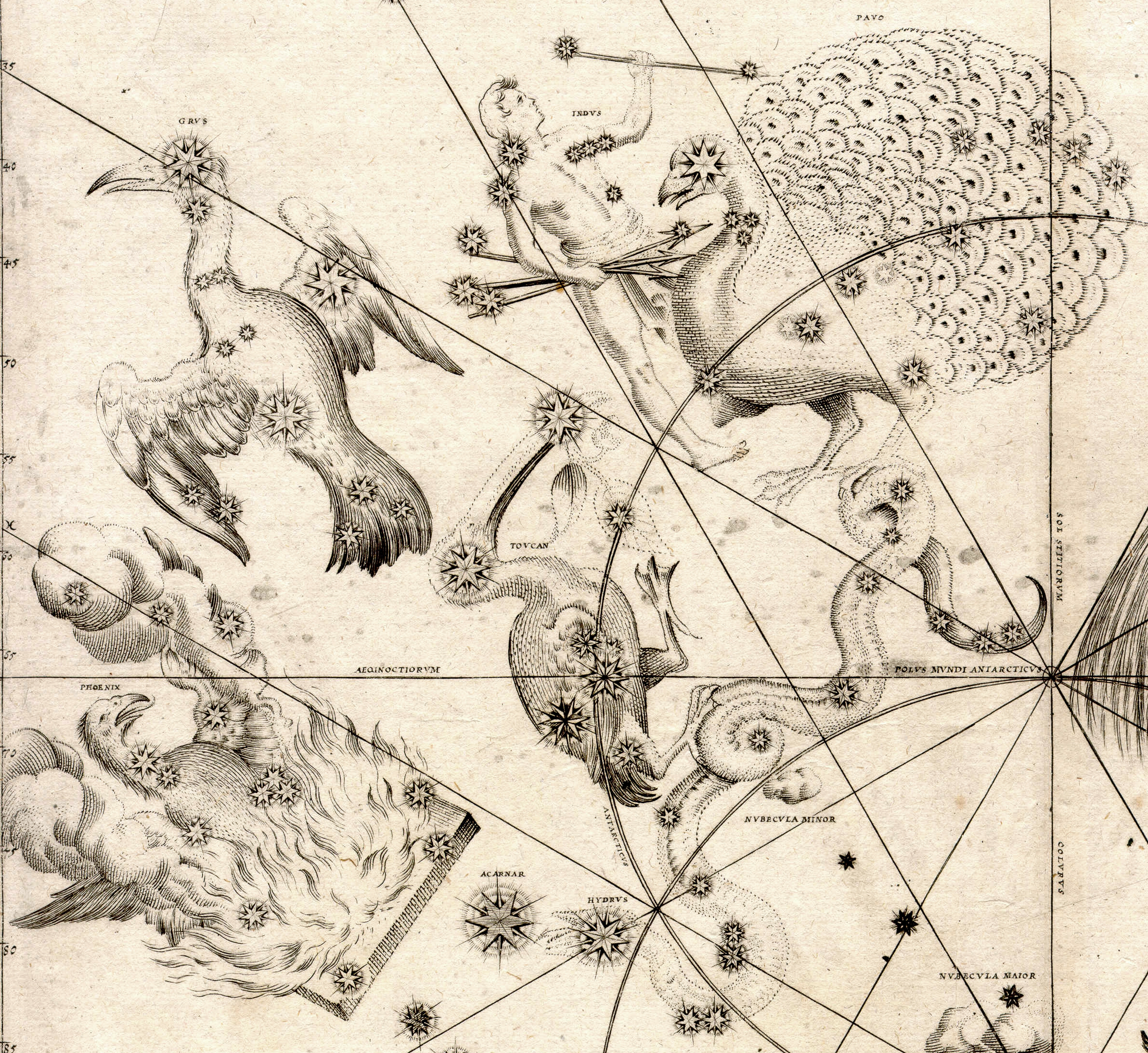
The "southern birds" as seen in Johann Bayer's Uranometria. Tucana (as "Toucan") is in the middle.

Tucana is one of the twelve constellations established by the astronomer Petrus Plancius from the observations of the southern sky by the Dutch explorers Pieter Dirkszoon Keyser and Frederick de Houtman, who had sailed on the first Dutch trading expedition, known as the Eerste Schipvaart, to the East Indies. It first appeared on a 35-centimetre-diameter (14 in) celestial globe published in 1598 in Amsterdam by Plancius with Jodocus Hondius. The first depiction of this constellation in a celestial atlas was in the German cartographer Johann Bayer's Uranometria of 1603. Both Plancius and Bayer depict it as a toucan. De Houtman included it in his southern star catalogue the same year under the Dutch name Den Indiaenschen Exster, op Indies Lang ghenaemt "the Indian magpie, named Lang in the Indies", by this meaning a particular bird with a long beak—a hornbill, a bird native to the East Indies. A 1603 celestial globe by Willem Blaeu depicts it with a casque. It was interpreted on Chinese charts as Niǎohuì "bird's beak", and in England as "Brasilian Pye", while Johannes Kepler and Giovanni Battista Riccioli termed it Anser Americanus "American Goose", and Caesius as Pica Indica. Tucana and the nearby constellations Phoenix, Grus and Pavo are collectively called the "Southern Birds".

== Characteristics ==
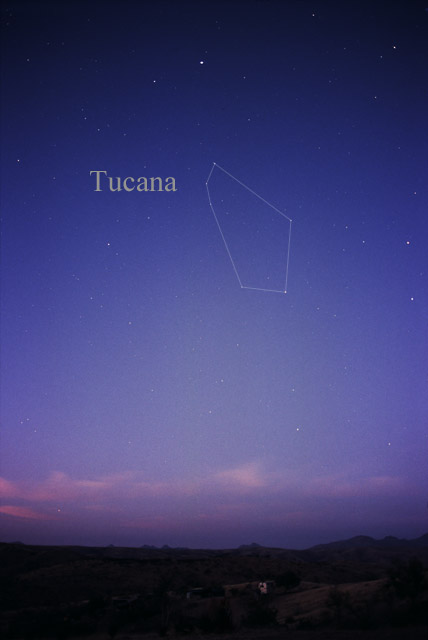
The constellation of Tucana, the toucan, as it can be seen by the naked eye

Irregular in shape, Tucana is bordered by Hydrus to the east, Grus and Phoenix to the north, Indus to the west and Octans to the south. Covering 295 square degrees, it ranks 48th of the 88 constellations in size. The recommended three-letter abbreviation for the constellation, as adopted by the International Astronomical Union in 1922, is "Tuc". The official constellation boundaries, as set by Belgian astronomer Eugène Delporte in 1930, are defined by a polygon of 10 segments. In the equatorial coordinate system, the right ascension coordinates of these borders lie between 22^{h} 08.45^{m} and 01^{h} 24.82^{m} , while the declination coordinates are between −56.31° and −75.35°. As one of the deep southern constellations, it remains below the horizon at latitudes north of the 30th parallel in the Northern Hemisphere, and is circumpolar at latitudes south of the 50th parallel in the Southern Hemisphere.

== Features ==
=== Stars ===
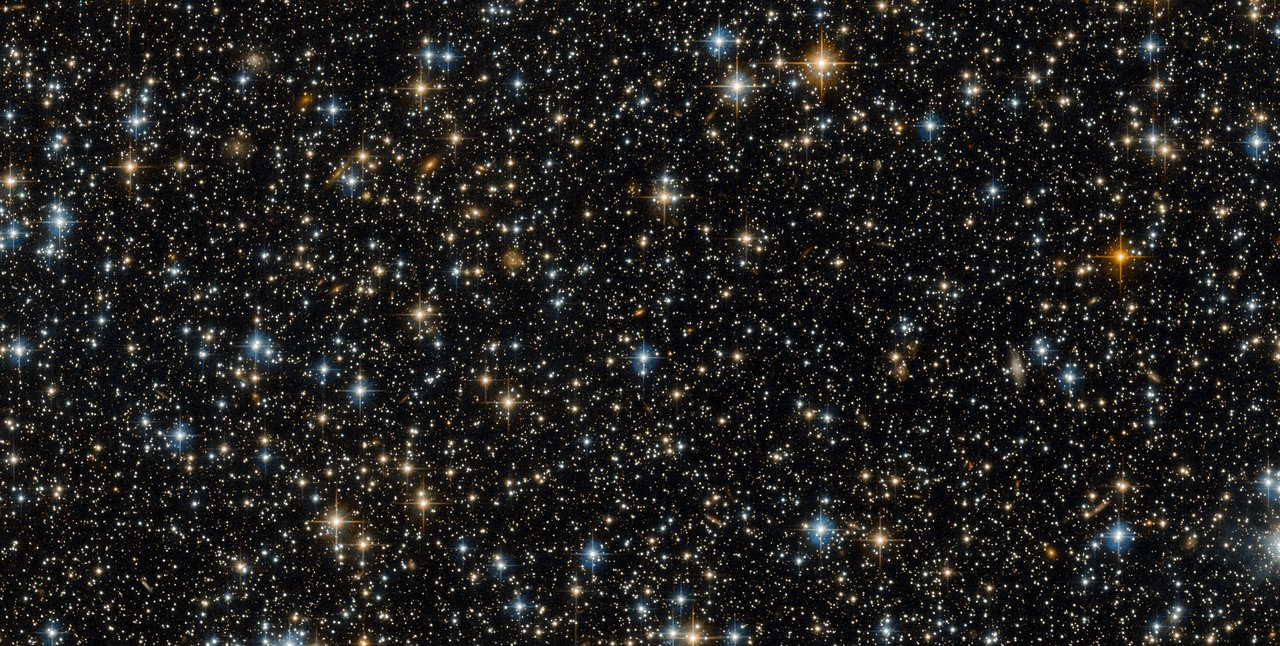
Sidekick or star of the show?

Although he depicted Tucana on his chart, Bayer did not assign its stars Bayer designations. French explorer and astronomer Nicolas Louis de Lacaille labelled them Alpha to Rho in 1756, but omitted Omicron and Xi, and labelled a pair of stars close together Lambda Tucanae, and a group of three stars Beta Tucanae. In 1879, American astronomer Benjamin Gould designated a star Xi Tucanae—this had not been given a designation by Lacaille who had recognized it as nebulous, and it is now known as the globular cluster 47 Tucanae. Mu Tucanae was dropped by Francis Baily, who felt the star was too faint to warrant a designation, and Kappa's two components came to be known as Kappa^{1} and Kappa^{2}.

The layout of the brighter stars of Tucana has been likened to a kite. Within the constellation's boundaries are around 80 stars brighter than an apparent magnitude of 7. At an apparent magnitude of 2.86, Alpha Tucanae (the proper name is Lang-Exster since 19 September 2024) is the brightest star in the constellation and marks the toucan's head. It is an orange subgiant of spectral type K3III around 199 light-years distant from the Solar System. A cool star with a surface temperature of 4300 K, it is 424 times as luminous as the Sun and 37 times its diameter. It is 2.5 to 3 times as massive. Alpha Tucanae is a spectroscopic binary, which means that the two stars have not been individually resolved using a telescope, but the presence of the companion has been inferred from measuring changes in the spectrum of the primary. The orbital period of the binary system is 4197.7 days (11.5 years). Nothing is known about the companion. Two degrees southeast of Alpha is the red-hued Nu Tucanae, of spectral type M4III and lying around 290 light-years distant. It is classified as a semiregular variable star and its brightness varies from magnitude +4.75 to +4.93. Described by Richard Hinckley Allen as bluish, Gamma Tucanae is a yellow-white sequence star of spectral type F4V and an apparent magnitude of 4.00 located around 75 light-years from Earth. It also marks the toucan's beak.

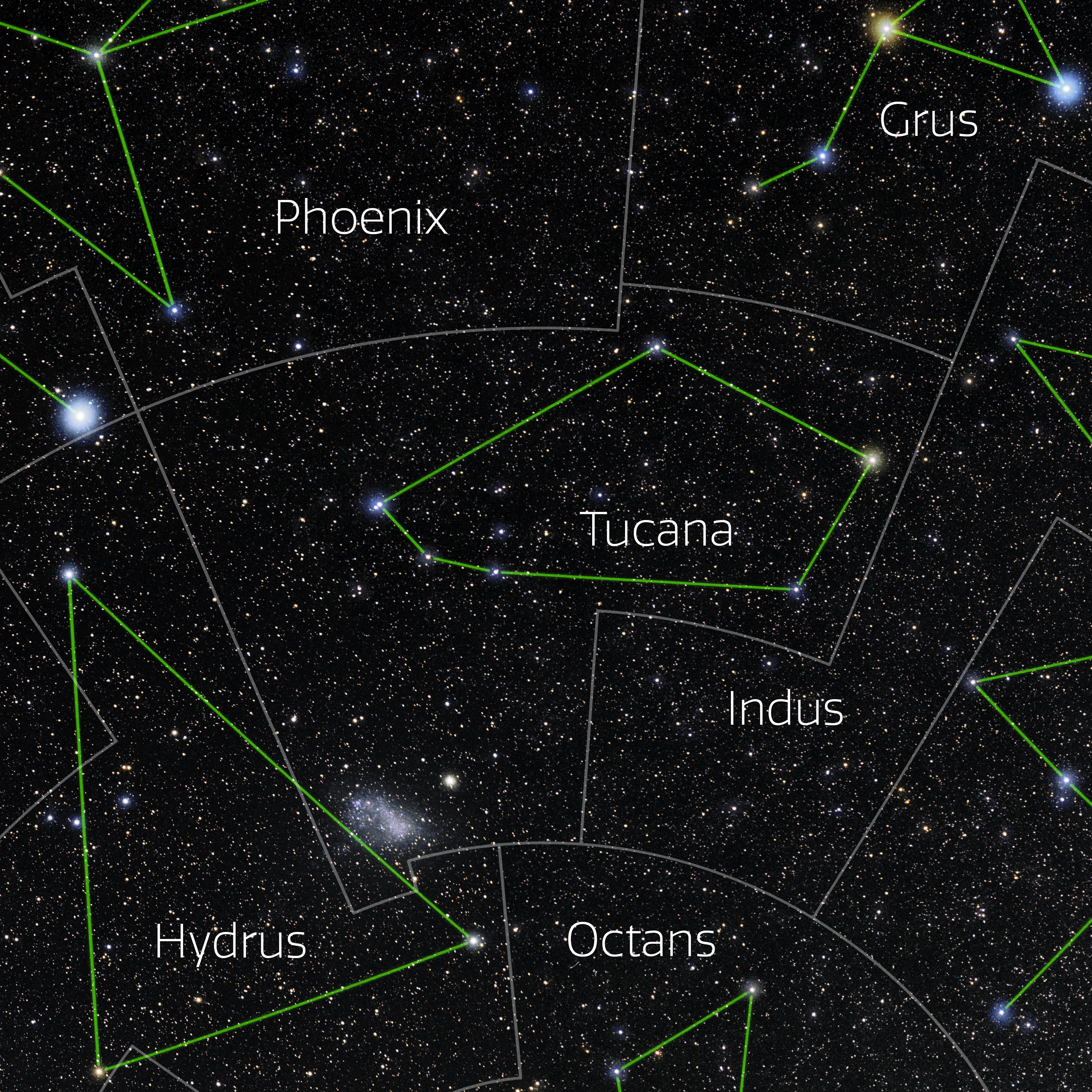
The constellation Tucana showing the IAU boundaries, the constellation stick figure, and labels for its brightest stars. Astrophotograph by Eckhard Slawik, from NOIRLab's 88 Constellations project.

Beta, Delta and Kappa are multiple star systems containing six, two and four stars respectively. Located near the tail of the toucan, Beta Tucanae's two brightest components, Beta^{1} and Beta^{2} are separated by an angle of 27 arcseconds and have apparent magnitudes of 4.4 and 4.5 respectively. They can be separated in small telescopes. A third star, Beta^{3} Tucanae, is separated by 10 arcminutes from the two, and able to be seen as a separate star with the unaided eye. Each star is itself a binary star, making six in total. Lying in the southwestern corner of the constellation around 251 light-years away from Earth, Delta Tucanae consists of a blue-white primary contrasting with a yellowish companion. Delta Tucanae A is a main sequence star of spectral type B9.5V and an apparent magnitude of 4.49. The companion has an apparent magnitude of 9.3. The Kappa Tucanae system shines with a combined apparent magnitude of 4.25, and is located around 68 light-years from the Solar System. The brighter component is a yellowish star, known as Kappa Tucanae A with an apparent magnitude of 5.33 and spectral type F6V, while the fainter lies 5 arcseconds to the northwest. Known as Kappa Tucanae B, it has an apparent magnitude of 7.58 and spectral type K1V. Five arcminutes to the northwest is a fainter star of apparent magnitude 7.24—actually a pair of orange main sequence stars of spectral types K2V and K3V, which can be seen individually as stars one arcsecond apart with a telescope such as a Dobsonian with high power.

Lambda Tucanae is an optical double—that is, the name is given to two stars (Lambda^{1} and Lambda^{2}) which appear close together from the Earth, but are in fact far apart in space. Lambda^{1} is itself a binary star, with two components—a yellow-white star of spectral type F7IV-V and an apparent magnitude of 6.22, and a yellow main sequence star of spectral type G1V and an apparent magnitude of 7.28. The system is 186 light-years distant. Lambda^{2} is an orange subgiant of spectral type K2III that is expanding and cooling and has left the main sequence. Of apparent magnitude 5.46, it is approximately 220 light-years distant from Earth.

Most of the Small Magellanic Cloud lies within Tucana.

Epsilon Tucanae traditionally marks the toucan's left leg. A B-type subgiant, it has a spectral type B9IV and an apparent magnitude of 4.49. It is approximately 373 light-years from Earth. It is around four times as massive as the Sun.

Theta Tucanae is a white A-type star around 423 light-years distant from Earth, which is actually a close binary system. The main star is classified as a Delta Scuti variable—a class of short period (six hours at most) pulsating stars that have been used as standard candles and as subjects to study asteroseismology. It is around double the Sun's mass, having siphoned off one whole solar mass from its companion, now a hydrogen-depleted dwarf star of around only 0.2 solar masses. The system shines with a combined light that varies between magnitudes 6.06 to 6.15 every 70 to 80 minutes.

Zeta Tucanae is a yellow-white main sequence star of spectral type F9.5V and an apparent magnitude of 4.20 located 28 light-years away from the Solar System. Despite having a slightly lower mass, this star is more luminous than the Sun. The composition and mass of this star are very similar to the Sun, with a slightly lower mass and an estimated age of three billion years. The solar-like qualities make it a target of interest for investigating the possible existence of a life-bearing planet. It appears to have a debris disk orbiting it at a minimum radius of 2.3 astronomical units. As of 2009, no planet has been discovered in orbit around this star.

Five star systems have been found to have planets, four of which have been discovered by the High Accuracy Radial Velocity Planet Searcher (HARPS) in Chile. HD 4308 is a star with around 83% of the Sun's mass located 72 light-years away with a super-Earth planet with an orbital period of around 15 days.HD 215497 is an orange star of spectral type K3V around 142 light-years distant. It is orbited by a hot super-Earth every 3 days and a second planet around the size of Saturn with a period of around 567 days.HD 221287 has a spectral type of F7V and lies 173 light-years away, and has a super-Jovian planet.HD 7199 has spectral type KOIV/V and is located 117 light-years away. It has a planet with around 30% the mass of Jupiter that has an orbital period of 615 days.HD 219077 has a planet around 10 times as massive as Jupiter in a highly eccentric orbit.

=== Deep-sky objects ===
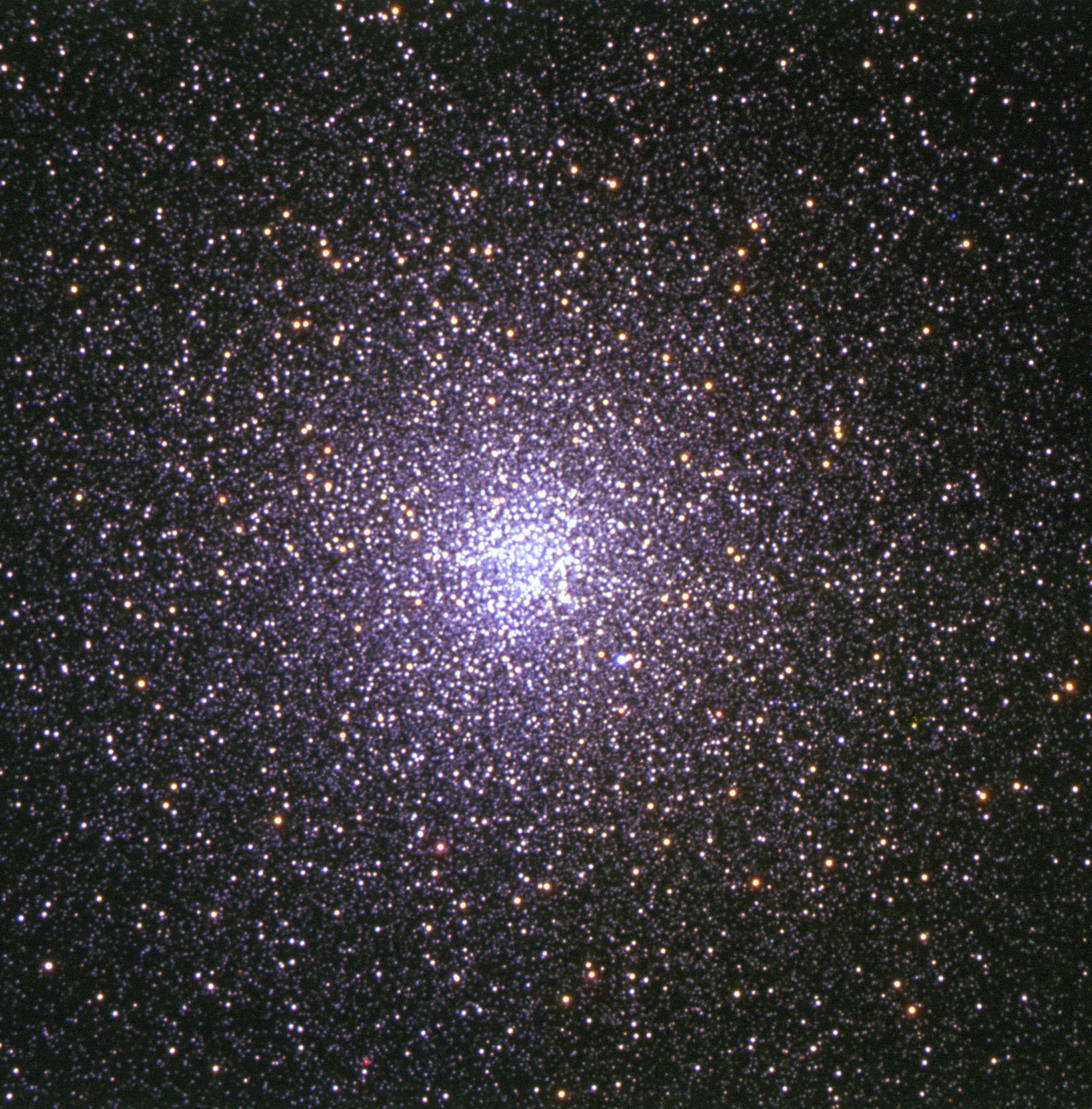
Globular Cluster 47 Tuc. Credit ESO

The second-brightest globular cluster in the sky after Omega Centauri, 47 Tucanae (NGC 104) lies just west of the Small Magellanic Cloud. Only 14,700 light-years distant from Earth, it is thought to be around 12 billion years old. Mostly composed of old, yellow stars, it does possess a contingent of blue stragglers, hot stars that are hypothesized to form from binary star mergers. 47 Tucanae has an apparent magnitude of 3.9, meaning that it is visible to the naked eye; it is a Shapley class III cluster, which means that it has a clearly defined nucleus. Near to 47 Tucana on the sky, and often seen in wide-field photographs showing it, are two much more distant globular clusters associated with the SMC: NGC 121, 10 arcminutes away from the bigger cluster's edge, and Lindsay 8.

NGC 362 is another globular cluster in Tucana with an apparent magnitude of 6.4, 27,700 light-years from Earth. Like neighboring 47 Tucanae, NGC 362 is a Shapley class III cluster and among the brightest globular clusters in the sky. Unusually for a globular cluster, its orbit takes it very close to the center of the Milky Way—approximately 3,000 light-years. It was discovered in the 1820s by James Dunlop. Its stars become visible at 180x magnification through a telescope.

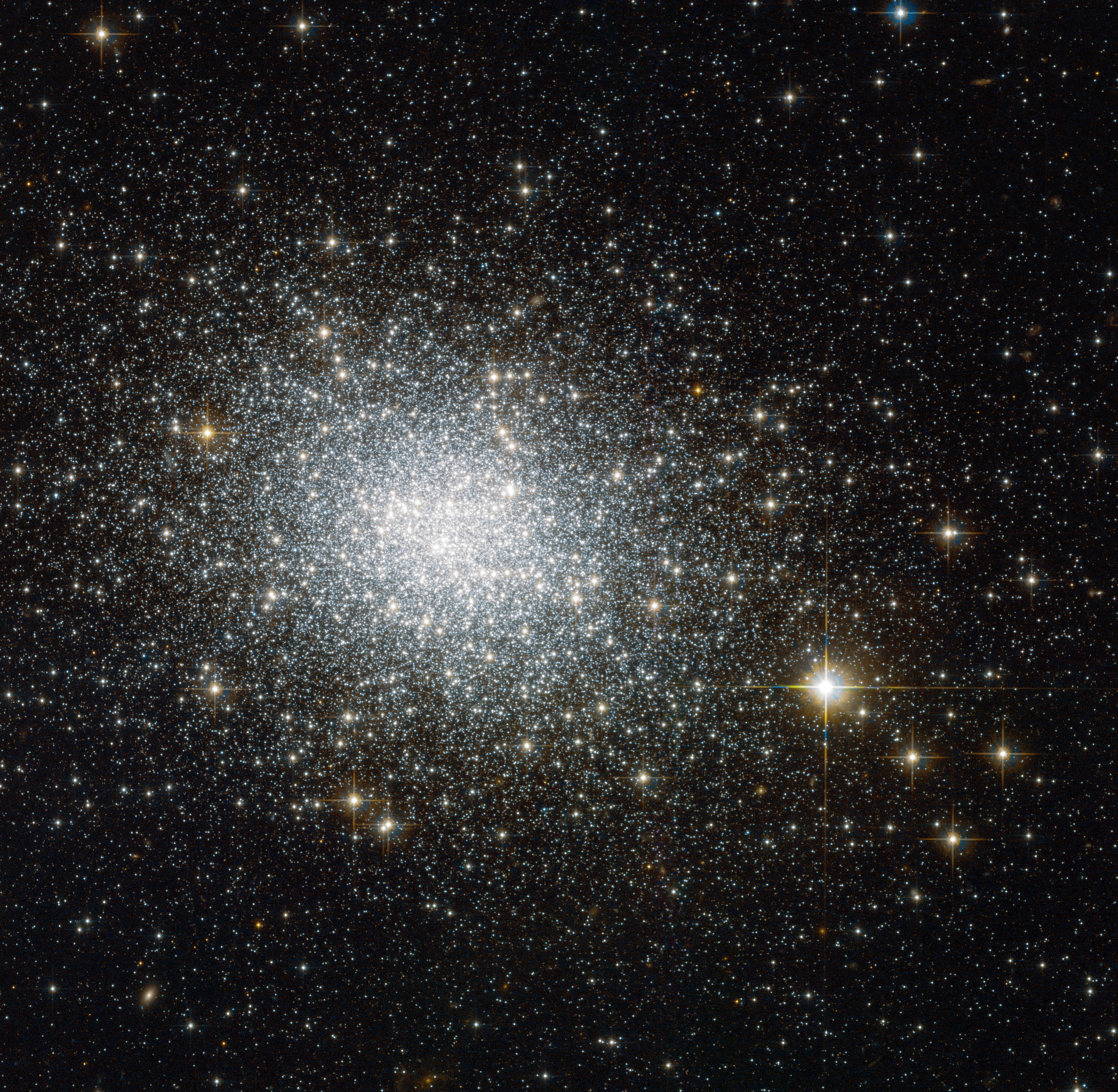
Globular cluster NGC 121

Located at the southern end of Tucana, the Small Magellanic Cloud is a dwarf galaxy that is one of the nearest neighbors to the Milky Way galaxy at a distance of 210,000 light-years. Though it probably formed as a disk shape, tidal forces from the Milky Way have distorted it. Along with the Large Magellanic Cloud, it lies within the Magellanic Stream, a cloud of gas that connects the two galaxies. NGC 346 is a star-forming region located in the Small Magellanic Cloud. It has an apparent magnitude of 10.3. Within it lies the triple star system HD 5980, each of its members among the most luminous stars known.

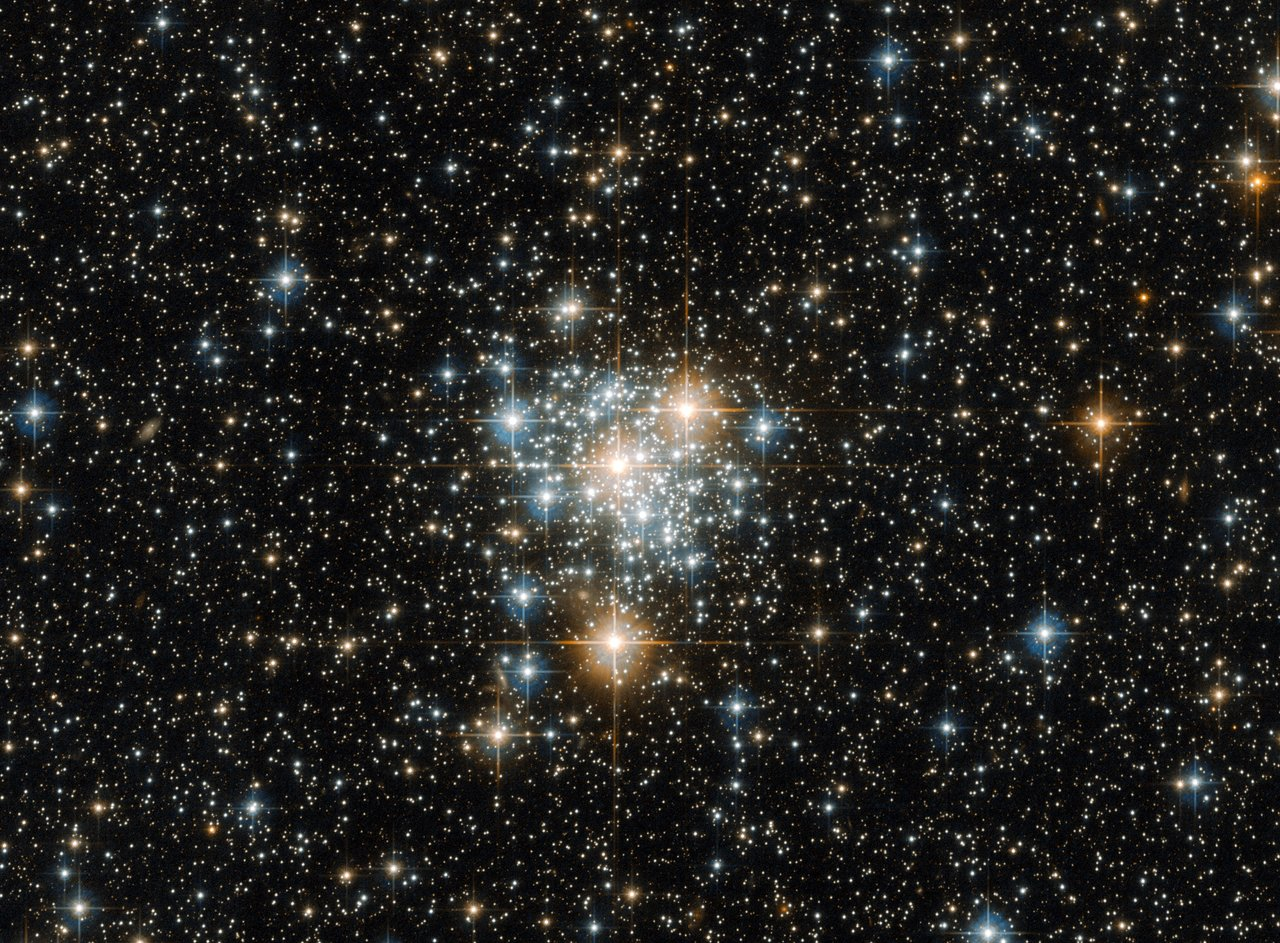
Open star cluster NGC 299 is located within the Small Magellanic Cloud.

The Tucana Dwarf galaxy, which was discovered in 1990, is a dwarf spheroidal galaxy of type dE5 that is an isolated member of the Local Group. It is located 870 kiloparsecs (2,800 kly) from the Solar System and around 1,100 kiloparsecs (3,600 kly) from the barycentre of the Local Group—the second most remote of all member galaxies after the Sagittarius Dwarf Irregular Galaxy.

The barred spiral galaxy NGC 7408 is located 3 degrees northwest of Delta Tucanae, and was initially mistaken for a planetary nebula.

In 1998, part of the constellation was the subject of a two-week observation program by the Hubble Space Telescope, which resulted in the Hubble Deep Field South. The potential area to be covered needed to be at the poles of the telescope's orbit for continuous observing, with the final choice resting upon the discovery of a quasar, QSO J2233-606, in the field.

== See also ==
- Tucana (Chinese astronomy)

== Cited texts ==
- Levy, David H. (2005). Deep Sky Objects. Prometheus Books. ISBN 1-59102-361-0.
