= List of star systems within 65–70 light-years =

This is a list of star systems within 65–70 light years of Earth.

== List ==
Key
#	Visible to the unaided eye
$	Bright star (absolute magnitude of +8.5 or brighter)
‡	White dwarf
§	Brown dwarf or sub-brown dwarf
*	Nearest in constellation

System	Star or (sub-) brown dwarf	Distance (ly)	Constellation	Coordinates: RA, Dec (Ep J2000, Eq J2000)	Stellar class	Apparent magnitude (V)	Parallax (mas)	Notes and additional references
HD 73752		65.0 ± 1.3	Pyxis	08^{h} 39^{m} 17.89867^{s} −22° 39′ 42.8283″	G3V	5.17		
Gliese 530		65.0 ± 1.1	Hydra		G5V	6.45		
HD 216520		65.0 ± 0.8	Cepheus		K0V			has 2 known exoplanets
GD 356		65	Draco	16^{h} 40^{m} 57.16^{s} +53° 41′ 09.6″	DC7	15.06		
Aldebaran (Alpha Tauri)$		65.1 ± 1.3	Taurus	04^{h} 35^{m} 55.23907^{s} +16° 30′ 33.4885″	K5III	0.86#		has 1 possible planet
Gliese 1233		65.2 ± 0.7	Draco		K0V			
Gliese 292.1		65.2 ± 1.4	Gemini		K2.5V	7.726		
Gliese 268.2		65.2 ± 1.3	Carina		KV	9.079		
GJ 1278		65.3 ± 1.4	Cepheus		M0.5V	9.838		
Gliese 328		65.3 ± 3.0	Hydra	08^{h} 55^{m} 07.62173^{s} +01° 32′ 47.4151″	M0V	9.997		has 2 known planets
Epsilon Scorpii (Larawag)$		65.4 ± 1.1	Scorpius	16^{h} 50^{m} 09.8^{s} −34° 17′ 36″	K1III	2.310#		
Gliese 342		65.4 ± 1.4	Draco		K7V			
Gliese 747.3		65.4 ± 2.0	Lyra		K6.5V	9.342		
53 Aquarii	A	65.5 ± 3.5	Aquarius	22^{h} 26^{m} 34.2753^{s} −16° 44′ 31.697″	G1V	6.35/6.57		
53 Aquarii	B	65.5 ± 3.5	Aquarius	22^{h} 26^{m} 34.2753^{s} −16° 44′ 31.697″	G5V			
Gliese 456.1		65.6 ± 1.3	Centaurus		K4V	8.438		
HD 110810		65.6 ± 1.3	Crux		K4V	7.843		
RR Caeli	A	65.65 ± 1.72	Caelum	04^{h} 21^{m} 05.563^{s} −48° 39′ 07.06″	DA7.8	14.40		has 1 known planet
RR Caeli	B	65.65 ± 1.72	Caelum	04^{h} 21^{m} 05.563^{s} −48° 39′ 07.06″	M6V			has 1 known planet
Alpha Caeli	A$	65.7 ± 0.7	Caelum	04^{h} 40^{m} 33.71251^{s} −41° 51′ 49.5045″	F2V	4.456/12.5#		
Alpha Caeli	B	65.7 ± 0.7	Caelum	04^{h} 40^{m} 33.71251^{s} −41° 51′ 49.5045″	M0.5			
81 Cancri	A	65.7 ± 1.4	Cancer	09^{h} 12^{m} 17.547^{s} +14° 59′ 45.78″	G8V	6.77		
81 Cancri	B	65.7 ± 1.4	Cancer	09^{h} 12^{m} 17.547^{s} +14° 59′ 45.78″	K1V			
81 Cancri	C	65.7 ± 1.4	Cancer	09^{h} 12^{m} 17.547^{s} +14° 59′ 45.78″	L8			
81 Cancri	D	65.7 ± 1.4	Cancer	09^{h} 12^{m} 17.547^{s} +14° 59′ 45.78″	L8			
Gliese 762.2		65.7 ± 1.3			GV			
HD 136923		65.7 ± 1.2			KV			
HD 149806		65.7 ± 1.2			KV			
Hamal (Alpha Arietis)$		65.9 ± 1.3	Aries	02^{h} 07^{m} 10.40570^{s} +23° 27′ 44.7032″	K1IIIb	2.00#		has 1 known planet
GJ 3620		65.9 ± 1.7			KV			
Gliese 765.4		65.9 ± 1.1			KV			
GJ 3293		65.91 ± 0.03	Eridanus	04^{h} 28^{m} 35.71911^{s} −25° 10′ 09.2979″	M2.5	11.96		Has 4 exoplanets.
DENIS-P J1228.2-1547		66.0 ^{+2.6}_{−2.4}	Corvus	12^{h} 28^{m} 15.232^{s} −15° 47′ 34.23″	L5.5			
Kappa Tucanae		66.04 ± 1.2	Tucana	01^{h} 15^{m} 46.0891^{s} −68° 52′ 33.401″	F6IV	4.25		
HD 128400		66.1	Apus*		G6V			
HR 8853		66.1 ± 0.8	Cassiopeia	23^{h} 16^{m} 42.304^{s} +53° 12′ 48.51″	FV			
Gliese 199		66.1 ± 3.0			KV			
Gamma Doradus		66.2 ± 0.7	Dorado	04^{h} 16^{m} 01.58662^{s} −51° 29′ 11.9327″	F0V	4.25		
Gliese 836.8		66.2 ± 2.0			KV			
WISE 0413-4750		66.2			T9			
Gliese 221	A	66.3 ^{+2.3}_{−2.1}	Orion	05^{h} 53^{m} 00.285^{s} −05° 59′ 41.44″	K7V	9.69		has 3 known planets
Gliese 221	B	66.3 ^{+2.3}_{−2.1}	Orion	05^{h} 53^{m} 00.285^{s} −05° 59′ 41.44″	M0V			has 3 known planets
Gliese 840		66.3 ± 1.3			KV			
GJ 2001		66.3 ± 1.1			KV			
Tau Cygni	A (Enduri Senggu)	66.4 ± 0.8	Cygnus	21^{h} 14^{m} 47.4916^{s} +38° 02′ 43.141″	F2IV	3.80/6.69		
Tau Cygni	B	66.4 ± 0.8	Cygnus	21^{h} 14^{m} 47.4916^{s} +38° 02′ 43.141″	G0V			
GJ 3863		66.4 ± 0.9			GV			
Gliese 558		66.4 ± 1.8			KV			
HR 6349		66.5 ± 1.2			FV			
9 Ceti		66.5 ± 1.3	Cetus	00^{h} 22^{m} 51.788^{s} −12° 12′ 33.97″	G3V	6.39		
Gliese 257.1		66.6 ± 1.3			KV			
GJ 1069		66.6 ^{+6.7}_{−5.6}			KV			
HD 114783		66.6 ± 1.5	Virgo	13^{h} 12^{m} 43.78556^{s} −02° 15′ 54.1307″	K0V	7.57		Has 2 known planets
DK Leonis		66.6 ± 2.4	Leo		KV			
Sigma² Ursae Majoris	A	66.7 ± 0.9	Ursa Major	09^{h} 10^{m} 23.538^{s} +67° 08′ 02.44″	F7IV	4.85/8.16		
Sigma² Ursae Majoris	B	66.7 ± 0.9	Ursa Major	09^{h} 10^{m} 23.538^{s} +67° 08′ 02.44″	K2V			
HD 30501		66.7 ± 0.9			KV			
GJ 9714		66.7 ± 2.4			KV			
HR 8531		66.8 ± 0.8			FV			
HD 114613		66.8 ± 1.1	Centaurus	13^{h} 12^{m} 03.18430^{s} −37° 48′ 10.8799″	G3IV	4.852		has 2 known planets
GJ 1262		66.8 ± 1.1			GV			
Gliese 783.2		66.8 ± 1.3			KV			
GJ 1172		66.9 ± 2.3			KV			
GJ 3358		66.9 ± 1.4			KV			
HD 155712		67.0 ± 1.4			KV			
HR 8843		67.1 ± 0.8			FV			
Gliese 217		67.1 ± 1.4			KV			
Gliese 330.1		67.2 ± 1.8			MV			
WISE 0123+4142		67.2			T7			
WISE 0625+5646		67.2			T6			
GJ 3593		67.3 ± 1.2			GV			
HD 332518		67.3 ± 1.7			KV			
HD 24496	A	67.4 ± 1.5	Taurus	03^{h} 54^{m} 28.03326^{s} +16° 36′ 57.7897″	G7V	6.822		has 1 known planet
HD 24496	B	67.4 ± 1.5	Taurus	03^{h} 54^{m} 28.03326^{s} +16° 36′ 57.7897″	M2V			has 1 known planet
Gliese 808.2		67.4 ± 2.6			KV			
CR Draconis		67.4 ± 1.7	Draco		MV			
94 Aquarii	A	67.6 ^{+8.3}_{−6.6}	Aquarius	23^{h} 19^{m} 06.7257^{s} −13° 27′ 31.615″	G8.5IV	5.19/7.52		
94 Aquarii	B	67.6 ^{+8.3}_{−6.6}	Aquarius	23^{h} 19^{m} 06.7257^{s} −13° 27′ 31.615″	K2V			
GJ 1108		67.6 ^{+4.7}_{−4.2}			KV			
HIP 105533		67.6 ± 2.3			MV			
Gliese 53.1		67.7 ± 1.5			KV			
GJ 1084		67.7 ± 1.5			KV			
GJ 1008		67.7 ± 2.5			KV			
Gliese 30		67.7 ± 1.5			KV			
Gliese 544		67.8 ± 1.6			KV			
GJ 1280		67.9 ± 1.5			KV			
HD 104067		67.9 ± 1.5	Corvus	11^{h} 59^{m} 10.00884^{s} −20° 21′ 13.6121″	K3V	7.93		has 2 known planets and 1 candidate
Gliese 900	A	68 ± 0.03		23^{h} 35^{m} 00.27674^{s} +01° 36′ 19.4347″	K5-7	9.546		has 1 known exoplanet
Gliese 900	B	68 ± 0.03		23^{h} 35^{m} 00.27674^{s} +01° 36′ 19.4347″	M3-4			has 1 known exoplanet
Gliese 900	C	68 ± 0.03		23^{h} 35^{m} 00.27674^{s} +01° 36′ 19.4347″	M5-6			has 1 known exoplanet
17 Cygni	A	68.0 ± 0.8	Cygnus	19^{h} 46^{m} 25.600^{s} +33° 43′ 39.35″	F7V	5.00		
17 Cygni	B	68.0 ± 0.8	Cygnus	19^{h} 46^{m} 25.600^{s} +33° 43′ 39.35″	M0.4			
HR 7330		68.0 ± 1.9			GV			
Gliese 533		68.0 ± 2.6			KV			
HR 7631		68.1 ± 0.5			FV			
HR 5		68.2 ± 1.3	Cassiopeia	00^{h} 06^{m} 15.81387^{s} +58° 26′ 12.1073″	GV			
Gliese 415		68.2 ± 2.8			KV			
WISE 0821+1443		68.2			T5.5			
Theta Draconis		68.3 ± 0.8	Draco	16^{h} 01^{m} 53.34636^{s} +58° 33′ 54.9056″	F9V	4.1190		
13 Ceti	A	68.3 ± 1.8	Cetus	00^{h} 35^{m} 14.87968^{s} −03° 35′ 34.2367″	F6V			
13 Ceti	B	68.3 ± 1.8	Cetus	00^{h} 35^{m} 14.87968^{s} −03° 35′ 34.2367″	K3.5V			
13 Ceti	C	68.3 ± 1.8	Cetus	00^{h} 35^{m} 14.87968^{s} −03° 35′ 34.2367″	G4V			
HR 7260		68.3 ± 1.1			GV			
HD 33564		68.4 ± 0.8	Camelopardalis	05^{h} 22^{m} 33.5306^{s} +79° 13′ 52.143″	F6V	5.095		has 1 known planet
Gliese 371		68.4 ± 2.3			KV			
HD 220221		68.4 ± 1.4			KV			
HR 8013		68.5 ± 1.4			FV			
Gliese 59.1		68.5 ± 0.9			GV			
HR 7914		68.5 ± 1.1			GV			
HD 119802		68.5 ± 1.7			KV			
Gliese 491		68.5 ± 1.3			KV			
HD 216259		68.6 ± 1.7			KV			
Gliese 396		68.6 ± 0.9			KV			
HD 124580		68.7 ± 1.2			FV			
71 Orionis		68.9 ± 1.3	Orion	06^{h} 14^{m} 50.94^{s} +19° 09′ 24.8″	FV			
Gliese 889		68.9 ± 2.8			KV			
VHS J1256−1257	A	69.0 ± 0.7	Corvus	12^{h} 56^{m} 02.1337^{s} −12° 57′ 21.924″	M7.5 ± 0.5	17.759 ± 0.059		
VHS J1256−1257	B	69.0 ± 0.7	Corvus	12^{h} 56^{m} 02.1337^{s} −12° 57′ 21.924″	L7.0 ± 1.5			
40 Leonis		69.0 ± 1.2	Leo	10^{h} 19^{m} 44.16688^{s} +19° 28′ 15.2943″	F6IV	4.80		
51 Arietis		69.0 ± 1.3	Aries	03^{h} 02^{m} 26.02628^{s} +26° 36′ 33.2602″	G8V	6.623		
Gliese 336		69.0 ^{+4.5}_{−4.0}			MV			
I Puppis		69.1 ± 0.8	Puppis	07^{h} 12^{m} 33.62514^{s} −46° 45′ 33.4966″	FIV			
V774 Tauri		69.1 ± 1.6	Taurus		GV			
GJ 1165		69.1 ± 2.9			KV			
Gliese 659		69.2 ± 2.9			KV			
Gliese 276		69.3 ± 1.9			KV			
GJ 1048		69.3 ± 1.6			KV			
HD 210277		69.4 ± 1.2	Aquarius	22^{h} 09^{m} 29.8658^{s} −07° 32′ 55.162″	G0IV	6.63		has 1 known planet
HR 3578		69.5 ± 1.5			FV			
Gliese 155.2		69.5 ± 1.4			KV			
HD 97658		69.5 ± 1.5	Leo	11^{h} 14^{m} 33.1613^{s} +25° 42′ 37.392″	K1V	6.27		has 1 known planet
Gliese 122		69.5 ± 2.1			MV			
50 Persei		69.6 ± 1.2	Perseus	04^{h} 08^{m} 36.61660^{s} +38° 02′ 23.0488″	F7V	5.52		
HR 5070		69.6 ± 0.8			GV			
GJ 3917		69.6 ± 1.6			GV			
Iota Virginis (Syrma)		69.8 ± 1.3	Virgo	14^{h} 16^{m} 00.868^{s} −06° 00′ 01.97″	F7IV	4.07		
HR 3220 (B Carinae)		69.8 ^{+5.4}_{−4.7}	Carina	08^{h} 09^{m} 00.56958^{s} −61° 18′ 08.5836″	F6V	4.75		
HD 10086		69.8 ± 1.2			GIV			
GJ 3257		69.8 ± 1.5			GV			
16 Cygni	A	69.8 ± 0.8	Cygnus	19^{h} 41^{m} 48.9535^{s} +50° 31′ 30.220″	G1.5Vb	5.96/6.20		Has 1 confirmed exoplanet (16 Cygni Bb).
16 Cygni	B	69.8 ± 0.8	Cygnus	19^{h} 41^{m} 48.9535^{s} +50° 31′ 30.220″	G2.5Vb			Has 1 confirmed exoplanet (16 Cygni Bb).
16 Cygni	C	69.8 ± 0.8	Cygnus	19^{h} 41^{m} 48.9535^{s} +50° 31′ 30.220″	M			Has 1 confirmed exoplanet (16 Cygni Bb).
HD 92945		69.8 ± 1.0	Hydra	10^{h} 43^{m} 28.2716^{s} −29° 03′ 51.433″	K1V	7.76		
Gliese 857.1		69.8 ± 2.6			KV			
GJ 4254		69.8 ^{+14.1}_{−10.1}			MV			
WISE 0448-1935		69.8			T5 pec			
Kappa Reticuli	A	69.9 ± 0.7	Reticulum	03^{h} 29^{m} 22.67742^{s} −62° 56′ 15.1042″	F5V	4.71		
Kappa Reticuli	B	69.9 ± 0.7	Reticulum	03^{h} 29^{m} 22.67742^{s} −62° 56′ 15.1042″	KV			
V775 Herculis		69.9 ± 1.6	Hercules		KV			
System	Star or (sub-) brown dwarf	Distance (ly)	Constellation	Coordinates: RA, Dec (Ep J2000, Eq J2000)	Stellar class	Apparent magnitude (V)	Parallax (mas)	Notes and additional references

== See also ==
- Lists of stars
- List of star systems within 60–65 light-years
- List of star systems within 70–75 light-years
- List of nearest stars and brown dwarfs
