= List of star systems within 60–65 light-years =

This is a list of star systems within 60–65 light years of Earth.

== List ==
Key
#	Visible to the unaided eye
$	Bright star (absolute magnitude of +8.5 or brighter)
‡	White dwarf
§	Brown dwarf or sub-brown dwarf
*	Nearest in constellation

System	Star or (sub-) brown dwarf	Distance (ly)	Constellation	Coordinates: RA, Dec (Ep J2000, Eq J2000)	Stellar class	Apparent magnitude (V)	Parallax (mas)	Notes and additional references
HR 8314 (HN Pegasi)		60.0 ± 0.9	Pegasus	21^{h} 44^{m} 31.330^{s} +14° 46′ 18.98″	GV			
WISE 1436-1814		60.0			T8 pec			
Delta Equulei	A$ (Tepennekhet)	60.0 ± 1.0	Equuleus	21^{h} 14^{m} 28.81531^{s} +10° 00′ 25.1259″	F5V	4.49/5.4#		
Delta Equulei	B	60.0 ± 1.0	Equuleus	21^{h} 14^{m} 28.81531^{s} +10° 00′ 25.1259″	G0			
HD 53143		60.0 ± 0.6	Carina	06^{h} 59^{m} 59.65505^{s} −61° 20′ 10.2526″	K9V	6.80		
15 Leonis Minoris		60.1 ± 0.8	Leo Minor	09^{h} 48^{m} 35.37135^{s} +46° 01′ 15.6266″	G0V	5.12		
Gliese 339		60.1 ± 1.3			KV			
Gliese 161		60.2 ± 0.9			GV			
Gliese 2102		60.2 ± 1.2			KV			
Gliese 4134		60.4 ^{+9.0}_{−6.9}			KV			
Gliese 315		60.4 ± 1.2			KV			
Gliese 509		60.4 ± 2.5			KV			
HD 156985		60.4 ± 0.8			KV			
G 185-32		60.4 ^{+3.5}_{−3.2}	Vulpecula	19^{h} 37^{m} 13.7502^{s} +27° 43′ 18.7366″	DA4.0	13.00		
Gliese 610		60.5 ± 1.5			KV			
Gliese 106		60.5 ± 2.8			KV			
HR 244		60.6 ± 0.7	Cassiopeia	00^{h} 53^{m} 04.19644^{s} +61° 07′ 26.2993″	F9V	4.82		
Theta Cygni	A$	60.7 ± 0.5	Cygnus	19^{h} 36^{m} 26.53436^{s} +50° 13′ 15.9646″	F3V	4.490/13.03#		
Theta Cygni	B	60.7 ± 0.5	Cygnus	19^{h} 36^{m} 26.53436^{s} +50° 13′ 15.9646″	M3V			
Gliese 499		60.7 ± 2.2			KV			
WISE 2301+0216		60.7			T6.5			
Gliese 254		60.8 ± 2.0			KV			
Theta Centauri (Menkent)$		60.9 ± 0.9	Centaurus	14^{h} 06^{m} 40.94752^{s} −36° 22′ 11.8371″	K0III	2.06#		
Mu Virginis$		60.9 ± 1.1	Virgo	14^{h} 43^{m} 03.62282^{s} −05° 39′ 29.5327″	F2IV	3.88#		
HD 152606		60.9 ± 1.0			KV			
Gliese 902.1		60.9 ± 1.3			KV			
Kelu-1	A	60.9 ± 2.3	Hydra	13^{h} 05^{m} 40.196^{s} −25° 41′ 05.99″	L2			
Kelu-1	B	60.9 ± 2.3	Hydra	13^{h} 05^{m} 40.196^{s} −25° 41′ 05.99″	L4			
Gliese 1094		61.0 ± 2.3			KV			
HR 8061		61.1 ± 2.6			FV			
Tau Piscis Austrini$		61.1 ± 1.0	Piscis Austrinus	22^{h} 10^{m} 08.78019^{s} −32° 32′ 54.2703″	F6V	4.94#		
HR 8148		61.1 ± 1.3			GV			
HD 206804		61.1 ± 1.9			KV			
Gliese 715		61.2 ± 1.2			KV			
WISE 0150+3827		61.3			T0			
HD 4747	A	61.4 ± 1.2	Cetus	00^{h} 49^{m} 26.76537^{s} −23° 12′ 44.9359″	G8V	7.30		
HD 4747	B	61.4 ± 1.2	Cetus	00^{h} 49^{m} 26.76537^{s} −23° 12′ 44.9359″	L9			
Gliese 249		61.4 ± 1.4			KV			
Gliese 296		61.5 ± 9.7			KV			
HD 170573		61.5 ± 9.7			KV			
Gliese 1054		61.55 ± 0.85			M1Ve			
6 Ceti		61.6 ± 0.9	Cetus	00^{h} 11^{m} 15.85804^{s} −15° 28′ 04.7205″	F8V	4.89		
HR 7683		61.6 ± 0.6			GIV			
Gliese 583		61.6 ± 1.8			KV			
Gliese 4287		61.6 ± 2.3			KV			
Gliese 773		61.6 ± 1.8			KV			
WISE 2157+2659		61.6			T7			
Gliese 100		61.7 ± 2.3			KV			
Eta Serpentis (Tang)$		61.8 ± 0.9	Serpens	18^{h} 21^{m} 18.60056^{s} −02° 53′ 55.7766″	K0IV	3.260#		
Gliese 689		62.0 ± 0.9			KV			
WISE 1711+3500		62.0 ± 9.8			T8			
HD 139477		62.2 ± 0.9			KV			
110 Herculis		62.3 ± 0.8	Hercules	18^{h} 45^{m} 39.72570^{s} +20° 32′ 46.7171″	F6V	4.20		
HR 2643		62.3 ± 1.0			GV			
WISE 1721+1117		62.3			T6			
HR 3625		62.4 ± 1.1			FV			
Gliese 646		62.4 ± 2.4			KV			
Gliese 576		62.6 ± 2.5			KV			
Gliese 1246		62.6 ± 1.4			KV			
ADS 10075		62.6 ± 1.4			KV			
WISE 0049+0441		62.6			L9			
Rho Puppis (Tureis)$		62.7 ± 0.8	Puppis	08^{h} 07^{m} 32.64882^{s} −24° 18′ 15.5679″	F2mF5IIp	2.78#		
HD 25457		62.7 ± 0.9			FV			
Gliese 292.2		62.7 ± 2.3			GV			
Gliese 825.3		62.7 ± 1.5			KV			
Gliese 3546		62.7 ^{+11.4}_{−8.4}			KV			
WD 0806−661 (Maru)	A	62.73 ± 0.02	Volans	08^{h} 06^{m} 53.75366^{s} −66° 18′ 16.7011″	DQ4.2			
WD 0806−661 (Maru)	B	62.73 ± 0.02	Volans	08^{h} 06^{m} 53.75366^{s} −66° 18′ 16.7011″	Y1			
1 Centauri		62.8 ± 0.9	Centaurus	13^{h} 45^{m} 41.24482^{s} −33° 02′ 37.3997″	F3IV	4.23		
Gliese 1283		62.8 ± 1.4			KV			
HD 189733	A	62.8 ± 1.1	Vulpecula	20^{h} 00^{m} 43.71294^{s} +22° 42′ 39.0732″	K1.5V	7.676		has 1 known planet
HD 189733	B	62.8 ± 1.1	Vulpecula	20^{h} 00^{m} 43.71294^{s} +22° 42′ 39.0732″	M			has 1 known planet
Beta Pictoris$		62.9 ± 0.6	Pictor	05^{h} 47^{m} 17.09^{s} −51° 03′ 59.4″	A6V	3.861#		has 1 known planet
WISE 0032-4946		62.9			T8.5			
HD 43587	A	63.0 ± 1.0	Orion	06^{h} 17^{m} 16.139^{s} +05° 06′ 00.40″	G0V	5.70		
HD 43587	B	63.0 ± 1.0	Orion	06^{h} 17^{m} 16.139^{s} +05° 06′ 00.40″	M0V			
HD 43587	C	63.0 ± 1.0	Orion	06^{h} 17^{m} 16.139^{s} +05° 06′ 00.40″	M3.5V			
HD 43587	D	63.0 ± 1.0	Orion	06^{h} 17^{m} 16.139^{s} +05° 06′ 00.40″	M5V			
Gliese 710		63.0 ± 1.8	Serpens	18^{h} 19^{m} 50.8412^{s} −01° 56′ 19.005″	K7V	9.69		
Gliese 775.1		63.1 ± 1.0			GV			
Gliese 1126		63.1 ± 1.1			KV			
Gliese 45		63.1 ± 1.3			KV			
Gliese 816.1		63.2 ± 0.9			KV			
Omicron Aquilae	A	63.3 ± 0.9	Aquila	19^{h} 51^{m} 01.644^{s} +10° 24′ 56.59″	F8V	5.11		
Omicron Aquilae	B	63.3 ± 0.9	Aquila	19^{h} 51^{m} 01.644^{s} +10° 24′ 56.59″	M3V			
Gliese 790		63.3 ± 1.0			GV			
Gliese 9126		63.3 ^{+36.4}_{−16.9}			KV			
HD 274255		63.3 ^{+4.9}_{−4.3}			MV			
Alpha Chamaeleontis$		63.5 ± 0.6	Chamaeleon	08^{h} 18^{m} 31.552^{s} −76° 55′ 11.01″	F5V	4.066#		
HR 6465		63.5 ± 1.1			GV			
Gliese 894.5		63.5 ± 1.6			KV			
Gliese 59		63.6 ± 1.1			KV			
Gliese 571.1		63.6 ± 2.3			KV			
WISE 0812+4021		63.6			T8			
HD 130004		63.7 ± 1.2			KV			
c Ursae Majoris	A	63.8 ± 0.9	Ursa Major	09^{h} 14^{m} 20.542^{s} +61° 25′ 23.94″	G0V	5.20		
c Ursae Majoris	B	63.8 ± 0.9	Ursa Major	09^{h} 14^{m} 20.542^{s} +61° 25′ 23.94″	KV			
Gliese 204.1		63.8 ± 0.6			GV			
HIP 38594		63.8 ± 2.0			MV			
Gliese 3859		63.9 ± 0.7			GV			
74 Orionis		64.0 ± 1.1	Orion	06^{h} 16^{m} 26.61911^{s} +12° 16′ 19.7876″	FV			
Gliese 3383		64.0 ^{+8.5}_{−6.7}			GV			
Alpha Trianguli (Mothallah)	A$	64.1 ± 1.0	Triangulum	01^{h} 53^{m} 04.90710^{s} +29° 34′ 43.7801″	F5III-F6IV	3.42#		
Alpha Trianguli (Mothallah)	B	64.1 ± 1.0	Triangulum	01^{h} 53^{m} 04.90710^{s} +29° 34′ 43.7801″	M			
Alpha Trianguli (Mothallah)	C	64.1 ± 1.0	Triangulum	01^{h} 53^{m} 04.90710^{s} +29° 34′ 43.7801″	M			
Eta Crucis		64.2 ± 0.6	Crux*	12^{h} 06^{m} 52.89814^{s} −64° 36′ 49.4305″	F2III	4.14		
Gliese 3867		64.2 ± 1.3			GV			
HD 59747		64.2 ± 1.7			GV			
Gliese 906		64.2 ± 2.1			KV			
45 Boötis		64.3 ± 1.0	Boötes	15^{h} 07^{m} 18.06587^{s} +24° 52′ 09.0952″	F5V	4.93		
HD 217107		64.3 ± 1.0	Pisces	22^{h} 58^{m} 15.5408^{s} −02° 23′ 43.383″	G8IV	6.17		has 2 known planets
Gliese 81.2		64.3 ± 1.0			KV			
HD 189733 (V452 Vulpeculae)	B	64.50 ± 0.02	Vulpecula	20^{h} 00^{m} 42.97791^{s} +22° 42′ 34.1785″	M	~10		Has 1 confirmed exoplanet (HD 189733 b).
HD 189733 (V452 Vulpeculae)	A	64.42 ± 0.02	Vulpecula	20^{h} 00^{m} 42.97791^{s} +22° 42′ 34.1785″	K1.5V	7.676		Has 1 confirmed exoplanet (HD 189733 b).
HD 220140		64.4 ± 0.8			GV			
Gliese 140.1		64.4 ± 2.3			KV			
Gliese 3678		64.4 ± 1.5			KV			
EQ Virginis		64.5 ± 1.3	Virgo	13^{h} 34^{m} 43.2063^{s} −08° 20′ 31.3353″	K5Ve	9.31		
Gliese 3634		64.5 ^{+2.0}_{−1.9}	Hydra	10^{h} 58^{m} 35.08837^{s} −31° 08′ 38.2008″	M2.5	11.95		has 1 known planet
DENIS-P J020529.0-115925		64.5 ^{+2.0}_{−1.9}	Cetus	02^{h} 05^{m} 29.401^{s} −11° 59′ 29.67″	L5.5	17.3		
Nu² Canis Majoris$		64.7 ± 0.9	Canis Major	06^{h} 36^{m} 41.038^{s} −19° 15′ 21.17″	K1III	3.95#		has 1 known planet
Gliese 586		64.8 ± 1.5			KV			
Gliese 1164		64.8 ^{+4.4}_{−3.9}			KV			
LHS 1678 (TOI-696)		64.79±0.03	Caelum	04^{h} 32^{m} 42.635^{s} −39° 47′ 12.15″	M2V	12.482		Primary component is orbited by three exoplanets.
22 Lyncis		64.9 ± 1.1	Lynx	07^{h} 29^{m} 55.86^{s} +49° 40′ 21.6″	F6V			
HD 192263 (Phoenicia)		64.9 ± 1.5	Aquila	20^{h} 13^{m} 59.8456^{s} −00° 52′ 00.770″	K2V	7.79		has 1 known planet
HD 35112		64.9 ± 2.0			KV			
WISE 0612-3036		64.9			T6			
WISE 0929+0409		64.9			T6.5			
System	Star or (sub-) brown dwarf	Distance (ly)	Constellation	Coordinates: RA, Dec (Ep J2000, Eq J2000)	Stellar class	Apparent magnitude (V)	Parallax (mas)	Notes and additional references

== See also ==
- Lists of stars
- List of star systems within 55–60 light-years
- List of star systems within 65–70 light-years
- List of nearest stars and brown dwarfs
