= CC Andromedae =

Star in the constellation Andromeda

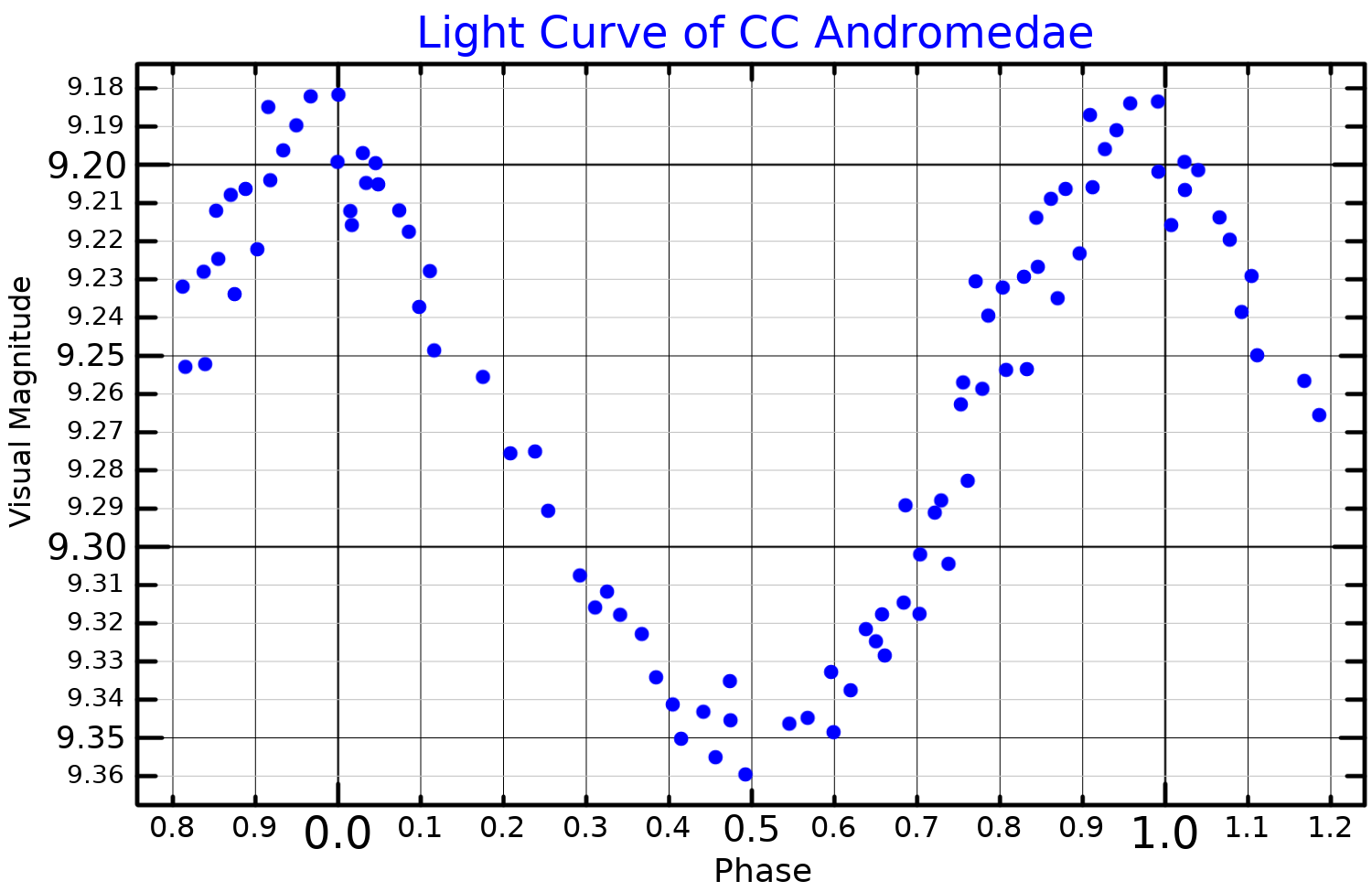
- The visual band light curve of CC Andromedae, adapted from Rousseau et al.

Observation data Epoch J2000 Equinox J2000
- Constellation: Andromeda
- Right ascension: 00^{h} 43^{m} 48.01231^{s}
- Declination: +42° 16′ 55.7690″
- Apparent magnitude (V): 9.19 – 9.46 variable

Characteristics
- Evolutionary stage: main sequence
- Spectral type: F3IV-V
- Apparent magnitude (R): 9.40
- Apparent magnitude (B): 9.693
- Apparent magnitude (V): 9.347
- Apparent magnitude (G): 9.3034
- Apparent magnitude (J): 8.586
- Apparent magnitude (H): 8.526
- Apparent magnitude (K): 8.49
- U−B color index: 0.11
- B−V color index: 0.3162
- Variable type: δ Sct

Astrometry
Radial velocity (R_{v})	−9.5±1.2 km/s
Proper motion (μ)	RA: -8.198 mas/yr Dec.: -3.920 mas/yr
Parallax (π)	2.6339±0.0175 mas
Distance	1,238 ± 8 ly (380 ± 3 pc)
Absolute bolometric magnitude (M_{bol})	1.25

Details
Mass	1.98 M_{☉}
Radius	3.04 R_{☉}
Surface gravity (log g)	3.77±0.1 cgs
Temperature	7,400 K
Rotational velocity (v sin i)	20 km/s

Other designations
- 2MASS J00434801+4216557, BD+41 119, HIP 3432, SAO 36605, TYC 2805-1116-1, Gaia DR3 387336407206270080

Database references
SIMBAD	data

CC Andromedae (CC And) is a variable star in the constellation Andromeda. It is a pulsating star of the Delta Scuti type, with an apparent visual magnitude that varies between 9.19 and 9.46 with a periodicity of 3 hours.

The variability of CC Andromedae was discovered accidentally, by Olin Eggen on October 22, 1952, when he attempted to use it as a comparison star for measuring the brightness and colors of stars in the Andromeda Galaxy which is about one degree away from CC Andromedae.

The stellar classification of CC Andromedae is F3IV-V, as it shows intermediate characteristics between a subgiant and a main sequence star. The brightness variations are the result of 7 different pulsation modes, most of which are non-radial, making it a suspected Gamma Doradus variable too.
