= 8 Draconis =

White-hued chemically unusual star in the constellation Draco

- Location of 8 Draconis (circled in red)

Observation data Epoch J2000.0 Equinox J2000.0 (ICRS)
- Constellation: Draco
- Right ascension: 12^{h} 55^{m} 28.54856^{s}
- Declination: +65° 26′ 18.5071″
- Apparent magnitude (V): 5.225

Characteristics
- Evolutionary stage: main sequence
- Spectral type: F1VmA7(n)
- B−V color index: 0.303±0.005
- Variable type: Gamma Doradus

Astrometry
Radial velocity (R_{v})	+9.0 km/s
Proper motion (μ)	RA: −3.658 mas/yr Dec.: −30.126 mas/yr
Parallax (π)	33.9667±0.0792 mas
Distance	96.0 ± 0.2 ly (29.44 ± 0.07 pc)
Absolute magnitude (M_{V})	2.90

Details
Mass	1.56 M_{☉}
Radius	1.50 R_{☉}
Luminosity	5.75 L_{☉}
Surface gravity (log g)	4.01 cgs
Temperature	7,129 K
Metallicity [Fe/H]	−0.14 dex
Rotational velocity (v sin i)	119.6 km/s
Age	250±200 Myr

Other designations
- Taiyi, 8 Dra, IR Draconis, BD+66°778, FK5 486, HD 112429, HIP 63076, HR 4916, SAO 15941

Database references
SIMBAD	data

8 Draconis, formally named Taiyi /ˌtaɪˈjiː/, is a single star in the northern circumpolar constellation of Draco. Based upon an annual parallax shift of 33.97 mas as seen from the Earth, the star is located 96 light-years from the Sun. It is moving further away with a heliocentric radial velocity of +9 km/s, having come within 40.6 ly some 2.6 million years ago.

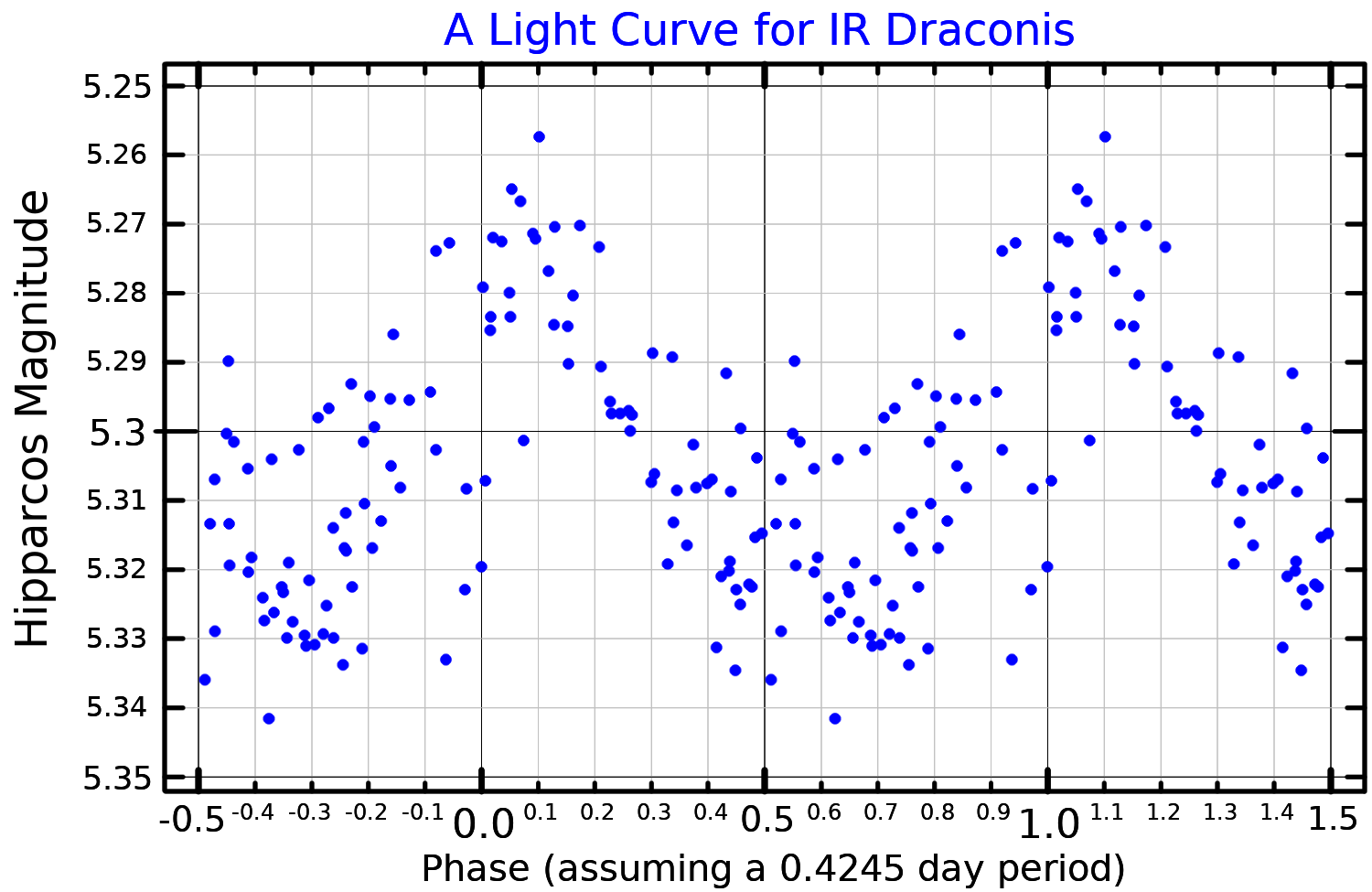
A light curve for IR Draconis, adapted from Aerts et al. (1998)

This is an F-type main-sequence star with a stellar classification of F1VmA7(n). It is a Gamma Doradus variable star with a brightness variation of about one tenth of a magnitude. 8 Dra has a relatively high rate of rotation, showing a projected rotational velocity of 120 km/s. The star has 1.56 times the mass of the Sun and 1.50 times the Sun's radius. It is radiating 5.75 times the Sun's luminosity from its photosphere at an effective temperature of 7,129 K. An infrared excess has been detected at wavelengths of 24 and 70μm, which suggests the presence of a circumstellar disk orbiting the star.

== Nomenclature ==
8 Draconis is the star's Flamsteed designation. It also received the variable star designation IR Draconis in 2000, after its variability had been discovered using Hipparcos photometry.

The star bore the traditional Chinese name of Taiyi, from 太乙 (Tài Yǐ) or 太一 (Tài Yī, the Great One), both of which refer to Tao. Alternatively, Taiyi may refer to HD 119476 (Note: Stellarium, citing Yi Shitong, 1981) or 4 Draconis, with 7 and 8 Draconis forming Neichu, representing a private kitchen. In 2016, the International Astronomical Union organized a Working Group on Star Names (WGSN) to catalogue and standardize proper names for stars. The WGSN approved the name Taiyi for this star on 30 June 2017 and it is now so entered in the IAU Catalog of Star Names.
