= 50 Persei =

Star in the constellation Perseus

- Location of 50 Persei (circled in red)

Observation data Epoch J2000.0 Equinox ICRS
- Constellation: Perseus
- Right ascension: 04^{h} 08^{m} 36.61660^{s}
- Declination: +38° 02′ 23.0488″
- Apparent magnitude (V): 5.52

Characteristics
- Evolutionary stage: main sequence
- Spectral type: F7 V
- U−B color index: +0.00
- B−V color index: +0.54
- Variable type: RS CVn and BY Dra

Astrometry
| Radial velocity (R_{v}) | +26.2 km/s |
| Proper motion (μ) | RA: +164.10 mas/yr Dec.: −202.60 mas/yr |
| Parallax (π) | 47.63±0.26 mas |
| Distance | 68.5 ± 0.4 ly (21.0 ± 0.1 pc) |
| Absolute magnitude (M_{V}) | 3.87 |

Details
| Mass | 1.30 M_{☉} |
| Radius | 1.22 R_{☉} |
| Luminosity | 2.3 L_{☉} |
| Surface gravity (log g) | 4.38 cgs |
| Temperature | 6,429 K |
| Metallicity [Fe/H] | −0.11 dex |
| Rotation | 2.71 days |
| Rotational velocity (v sin i) | 20.81 km/s |
| Age | 600 Myr |

Other designations
- 50 Per, BD+37°882, FK5 2297, GJ 9145, HD 25998, HIP 19335, V582 Persei, HR 1278, SAO 57006.

Database references
| SIMBAD | data |

50 Persei is a star in the constellation Perseus. Its apparent magnitude is 5.52, which is bright enough to be seen with the naked eye. Located around 21.00 parsecs (68.5 ly) distant, it is a White main-sequence star of spectral type F7V, a star that is currently fusing its core hydrogen. In 1998 the star was named a candidate Gamma Doradus variable with a period of 3.05 days, which would means it displays variations in luminosity due to non-radial pulsations in the photosphere. Subsequently, it was classified as a RS Canum Venaticorum and BY Draconis variable by an automated program.

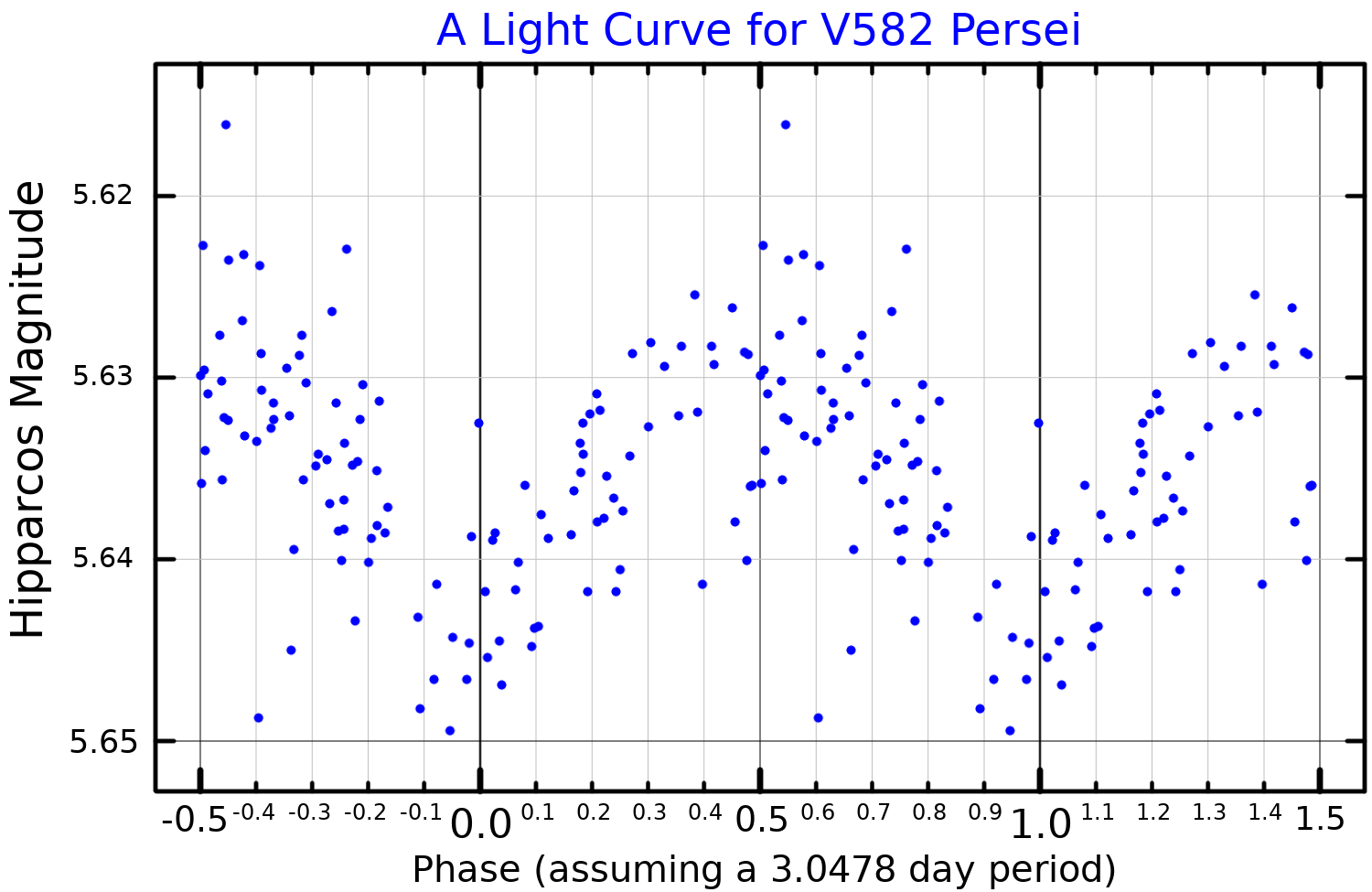
A light curve for V582 Persei, plotted from Hipparcos data

This is probably a binary system with an unseen companion. It is physically associated with the likely binary system HIP 19255, with the two pairs orbiting each other over a time scale of around a million years. The components of HIP 19255 have an angular separation of 3.87″ and the two components orbit each other every 590 years. 50 Persei may share a gravitational association with Capella, even though the two are separated by nearly 15° − equivalent to a distance of 19 ly (5.9 pc).

50 Persei is emitting an infrared excess at a wavelength of 70 μm, suggesting the presence of a circumstellar debris disk. The disk has a temperature of 96±5 K.
