= V529 Andromedae =

Star in the constellation Andromeda

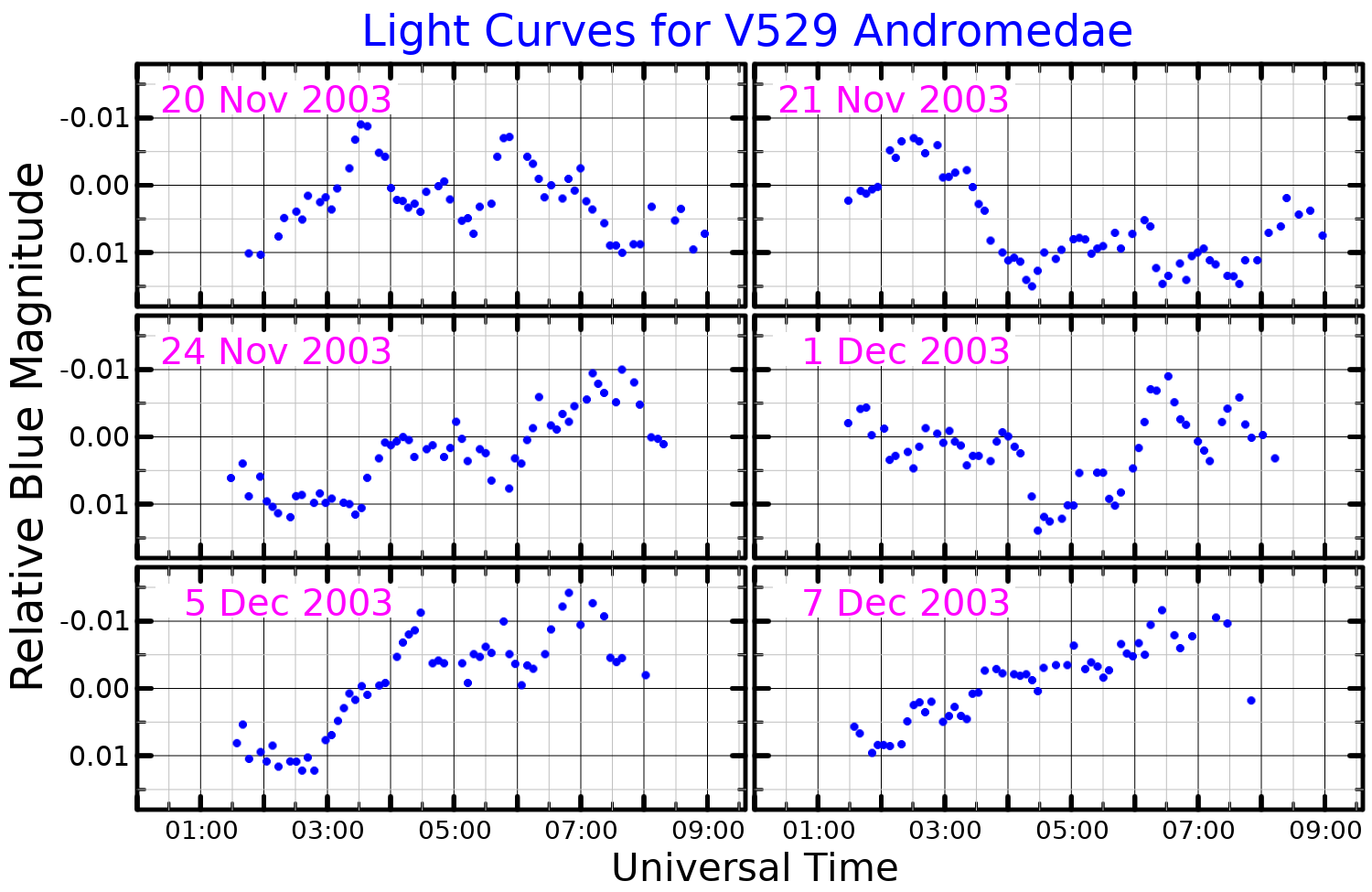
- Blue band light curves for V529 Andromedae, adapted from Henry and Fekel (2005)

Observation data Epoch J2000 Equinox ICRS
- Constellation: Andromeda
- Right ascension: 01^{h} 27^{m} 26.6729^{s}
- Declination: +41° 06′ 04.178″
- Apparent magnitude (V): 6.46

Characteristics
- Evolutionary stage: main sequence
- Spectral type: Am(kA5/hF1/mF2)
- U−B color index: 0.03
- B−V color index: 0.27
- V−R color index: 0.26
- R−I color index: 0.16
- Variable type: γ Doradus and δ Scuti

Astrometry
Radial velocity (R_{v})	0.8±0.3 km/s
Proper motion (μ)	RA: 9.611±0.030 mas/yr Dec.: 25.910±0.024 mas/yr
Parallax (π)	18.7624±0.0298 mas
Distance	173.8 ± 0.3 ly (53.30 ± 0.08 pc)
Absolute magnitude (M_{V})	+2.68

Details
Mass	1.55±0.1 M_{☉}
Radius	1.7±0.1 R_{☉}
Luminosity	6.5±0.6 L_{☉}
Surface gravity (log g)	4.1±0.2 cgs
Temperature	7560±180 K
Metallicity	+0.11
Rotational velocity (v sin i)	53.1±0.5 km/s
Age	727 Myr

Other designations
- HD 8801, HIP 6794, SAO 37227, PPM 44004, HR 418, HD 8801, BD+40°289

Database references
SIMBAD	data

V529 Andromedae, also known as HD 8801, is a variable star in the constellation of Andromeda. It has a 13th magnitude visual companion star 15" away, which is just a distant star on the same line of sight.

It is also an Am star with a spectral classification Am(kA5/hF1/mF2), meaning that it has the calcium K line of a star with spectral type A5, the Balmer series of a F1 star, and metallic lines of an F2 star.

== Variability ==
The variable brightness of V529 Andromedae was first detected in the Hipparcos satellite data. It was classified as an "unsolved variable" (meaning it could not be placed into any specific variable star category) in the Hipparcos catalog released in 1997. The star's variability was confirmed in a study published by Gregory W. Henry and Francis C. Fekel in 2005, and the star was given its variable star designation in 2011.

V529 Andromedae was the first star known to combine Gamma Doradus and Delta Scuti type pulsations. Nine different pulsation frequencies have been observed, and three of them could arise from a previously unknown stellar pulsation mode.

== Companion ==
V529 Andromedae has a 13th magnitude companion about 15″ away. It is a far more distant star than V529 Andromedae, only coincidentally aligned in the sky.
