= HD 149989 =

Star in the constellation Ara

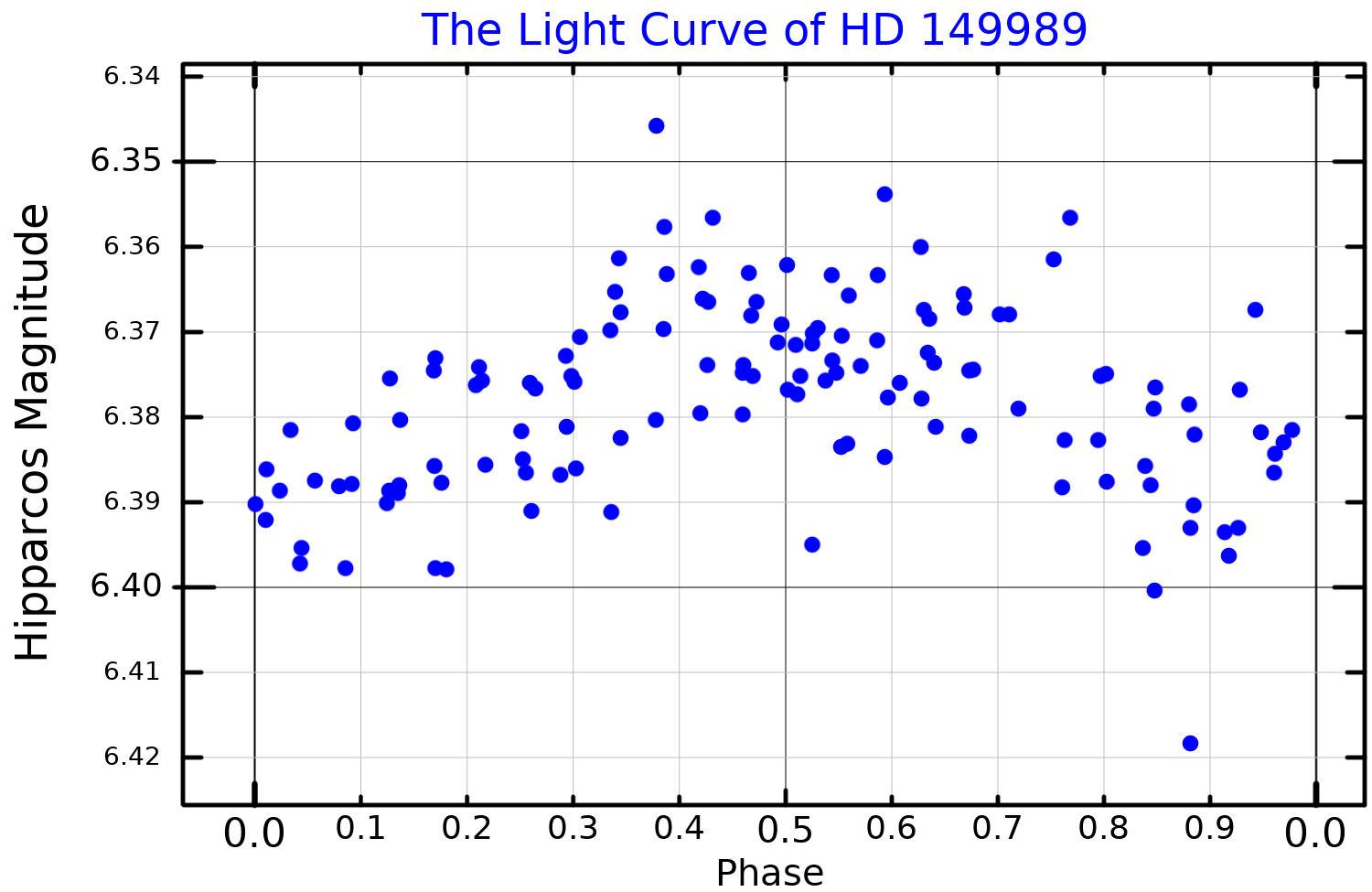
- A light curve of HD 149989 from Hipparcos data, assuming a period of 0.4266 days, adapted from Aerts et al. (1998)

Observation data Epoch J2000.0 Equinox ICRS
- Constellation: Ara
- Right ascension: 16^{h} 40^{m} 44.39899^{s}
- Declination: −51° 28′ 41.7258″
- Apparent magnitude (V): 6.30

Characteristics
- Evolutionary stage: main sequence
- Spectral type: A9 V or F1 V nn m-4
- B−V color index: 0.321±0.006
- Variable type: γ Dor

Astrometry
Radial velocity (R_{v})	45.9±0.5 km/s
Proper motion (μ)	RA: +11.741 mas/yr Dec.: +131.264 mas/yr
Parallax (π)	19.5759±0.0521 mas
Distance	166.6 ± 0.4 ly (51.1 ± 0.1 pc)
Absolute magnitude (M_{V})	2.83

Details
Mass	1.60 M_{☉}
Radius	1.70+0.08 −0.12 R_{☉}
Luminosity	6.27±0.02 L_{☉}
Surface gravity (log g)	4.21±0.14 cgs
Temperature	7,003+257 −159 K
Rotational velocity (v sin i)	136 km/s
Age	1.144 Gyr

Other designations
- V872 Arae, NSV 20726, CD–51°10403, CPD–51°9815, HD 149989, HIP 81650, SAO 244058

Database references
SIMBAD	data

HD 149989 is a single, variable star in the southern constellation of Ara, located near the western constellation border with Norma. It has the variable star designation V872 Arae, while HD 149989 is the identifier from the Henry Draper Catalogue. This is a dim star near the lower limit of visibility to the naked eye with an apparent visual magnitude that fluctuates around 6.30. It is located at a distance of 167 light years from the Sun based on parallax, and is drifting further away with a radial velocity of 46 km/s.

HD 149989 was discovered to be a variable star when the data from the Hipparcos mission was analyzed. The discovery was published in 1997, in the list of periodic variables seen by that satellite. In 1998, Conny Aerts et al. sifted through that list, and determined that HD 149989 is a Gamma Doradus type star. It has a period of 0.42658 days. It was given its variable star designation in March 2000.

This object is an A-type main-sequence star with a stellar classification of A9 V. A 2016 survey of γ Doradus stars found a class of F1 V nn m-4, where the 'nn' indicates "nebulous" lines due to rapid rotation and the 'm-4' means a metal-poor star with metal lines that match a class of A7. It is around 1.1 billion years old and is spinning with a projected rotational velocity of 136 km/s.
