= HD 49434 =

Star in the constellation Monoceros

- Location of HD 49434 (circled)

Observation data Epoch J2000.0 Equinox ICRS
- Constellation: Monoceros
- Right ascension: 06^{h} 48^{m} 19.066^{s}
- Declination: −01° 19′ 08.12″
- Apparent magnitude (V): 5.75

Characteristics
- Spectral type: F1V
- B−V color index: 0.292±0.004
- Variable type: γ Dor/δ Sct hybrid

Astrometry
Radial velocity (R_{v})	−17.2±0.2 km/s
Proper motion (μ)	RA: −37.120 mas/yr Dec.: −35.061 mas/yr
Parallax (π)	24.9902±0.0546 mas
Distance	130.5 ± 0.3 ly (40.02 ± 0.09 pc)
Absolute magnitude (M_{V})	2.74

Details
Mass	1.55±0.14 M_{☉}
Radius	1.601±0.052 R_{☉}
Luminosity	6.89 L_{☉}
Surface gravity (log g)	4.43±0.20 cgs
Temperature	7,632±126 K
Metallicity [Fe/H]	0.33±0.04 dex
Rotational velocity (v sin i)	85.7±4.3 km/s

Other designations
- BD−01° 1386, HD 49434, HIP 32617, HR 2514, SAO 133687, PPM 176439, CoRoT 100

Database references
SIMBAD	data

HD 49434 is a single star in the equatorial constellation of Monoceros. It is faintly visible to the naked eye with an apparent visual magnitude of 5.75. Based on parallax measurements the star is located at a distance of 130.5 light years from the Sun, but it is drifting closer with a radial velocity of −17 km/s.

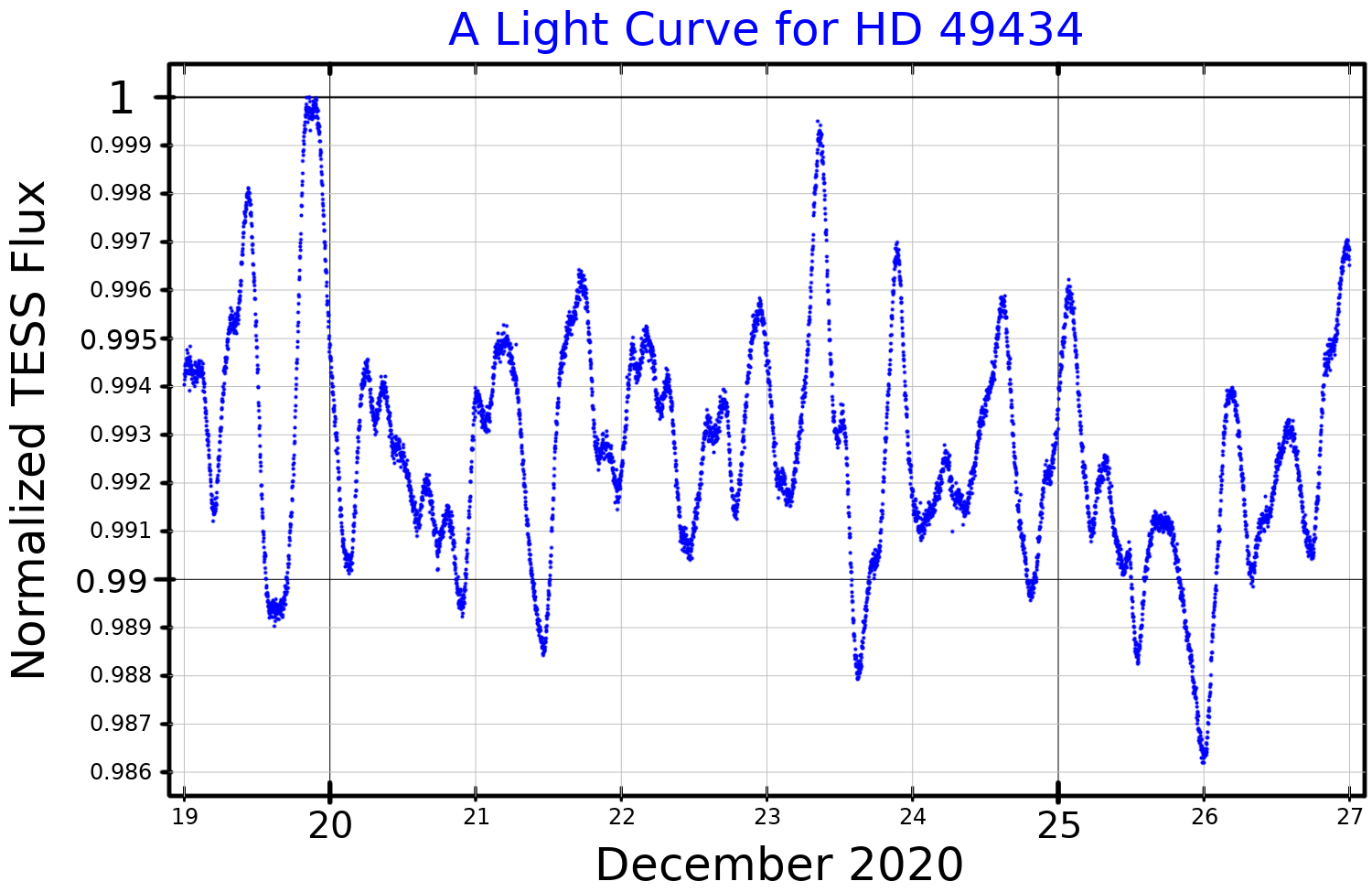
A light curve for HD 49434 plotted from TESS data

During a study with the ELODIE spectrograph from 1998 onwards it was found to show low amplitude variations of absorption line profiles, which is an indication of non-radial pulsations. It also displays a long period, low amplitude variation in luminosity, which together suggest it is a Gamma Doradus variable. Observation of the star during the CoRoT mission showed ten pulsation frequencies, four of which are typical for Gamma Doradus variables and six higher frequencies that are characteristic of Delta Scuti variables. Hence it is classified as a hybrid pulsator.

The spectrum of HD 49434 presents as an F-type main-sequence star with stellar classification of F1V. It displays a high rotation rate with a projected rotational velocity of 86 km/s. The star has 1.55 times the mass of the Sun and 1.60 times the Sun's radius. It is radiating 7 times the luminosity of the Sun from its photosphere at an effective temperature of 7,632 K.
