= HD 217107 c =

Extrasolar planet in the constellation Pisces

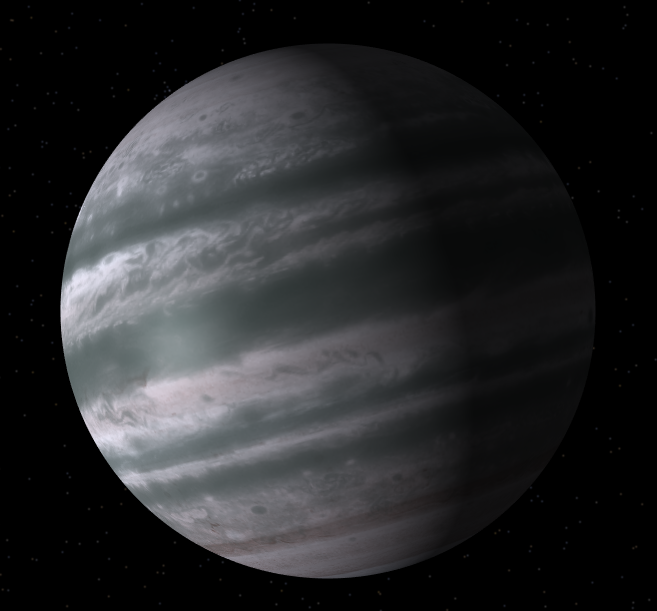

Discovery
- Discovered by: Vogt et al.
- Discovery site: United States
- Discovery date: June 24, 2005
- Detection method: Doppler spectroscopy

Orbital characteristics
- Semi-major axis: 5.922+0.035 −0.044 AU
- Eccentricity: 0.3918+0.0064 −0.0067
- Orbital period (sidereal): 5138±11 days
- Inclination: 88°+14° −12°
- Time of periastron: 2455911±15
- Argument of periastron: 205.0±1.1
- Semi-amplitude: 53.41±0.75
- Star: HD 217107

Physical characteristics
- Mass: 4.37+0.13 −0.10 M_{J}
- Temperature: 198±3 K

HD 217107 c is an extrasolar planet approximately 64 light-years away from Earth in the constellation of Pisces (the Fish). The planet was the second planet to be discovered orbiting the star HD 217107. HD 217107 c's existence was hypothesized in 1998 due to the eccentricity of the inner planet's orbit and confirmed in 2005 when radial velocity studies of the star indicated another, more distant and massive companion orbiting the star. The planet has an eccentric orbit lasting on order of a decade.

== Detection and discovery ==
A study of the radial velocity of HD 217107 carried out in 1998 revealed that its motion along the line of sight varied over a 7.1 day cycle, indicating the presence of a planet in orbit around the star. The planet was designated HD 217107 b, and was found to be somewhat heavier than Jupiter, and orbiting extremely close to the parent star in an orbit with quite a large eccentricity.

Most planets with orbital periods of less than 10 days have almost circular orbits, and its discoverers proposed that the high eccentricity of HD 217107 b's orbit could be due to the gravitational influence of a second planet in the system at a distance of several astronomical units (AU). Confirmation of the existence of the second planet followed in 2005, and it was designated HD 217107 c.

The parameters of this planet was initially very weakly constrained, with a period in excess of 8 years with a high eccentricity and a minimum mass of approximately two times the mass of Jupiter. Continued observations restrained the plausible solutions substantially, resulting in the current parameters published in 2008.

In 2025, the use of astrometry allowed the inclination and true mass of the planet to be found. The inclination is nearly edge-on, so the minimum mass is close to the real one.

== See also ==
- HD 217107
- HD 217107 b
