= HD 217107 b =

Extrasolar planet in the constellation Pisces

Discovery
- Discovered by: Marcy et al.
- Discovery site: United States
- Discovery date: November 24, 1998
- Detection method: Doppler spectroscopy

Orbital characteristics
- Semi-major axis: 0.07359+0.00042 −0.00053 AU
- Eccentricity: 0.1284+0.0015 −0.0014
- Orbital period (sidereal): 7.127017(5) d
- Inclination: 93°+25° −26°
- Time of periastron: 2455201.109±0.014
- Argument of periastron: 22.78+0.71 −0.70
- Semi-amplitude: 140.30±0.40
- Star: HD 217107

Physical characteristics
- Mass: 1.446+0.180 −0.167 M_{J}

HD 217107 b is an extrasolar planet approximately 65 light-years away from Earth in the constellation of Pisces (the Fish). The planet was discovered orbiting the star HD 217107 approximately every seven days, classifying the planet as a hot Jupiter. Because of the planet's somewhat eccentric orbit, scientists were able to confirm another planet within the system (HD 217107 c).

In 2025, the use of astrometry allowed the inclination and true mass of the planet to be found. The inclination is nearly edge-on, so the minimum mass is close to the real one.

== Discovery ==
It was found by detecting small variations in the radial velocity of the star it orbits, caused by the tug of its gravity. A study of the radial velocity of HD 217107 carried out in 1998 revealed that its motion along the line of sight varied over a 7.1 day cycle. The period and amplitude of this variation indicated that it was caused by a planetary companion in orbit around the star, with a minimum mass slightly greater than that of Jupiter. The planet's mean distance from the star is less than one fifth of Mercury's distance from the Sun.

=== Indication of second planet ===
While most planets with orbital periods of less than 10 days have almost circular orbits, HD 217107 b has a somewhat eccentric orbit, and its discoverers hypothesized that this could be due to the gravitational influence of a second planet in the system at a distance of several astronomical units (AU). Confirmation of the existence of a second planet, HD 217107 c, followed in 2005.

== See also ==
- HD 217107
- HD 217107 c
- List of exoplanets discovered before 2000
