= 9 Aurigae =

Multiple star system in the constellation Auriga

- Location of 9 Aurigae (circled)

Observation data Epoch J2000 Equinox ICRS
- Constellation: Auriga
- 9 Aurigae A
- Right ascension: 05^{h} 06^{m} 40.63060^{s}
- Declination: +51° 35′ 51.7990″
- Apparent magnitude (V): 4.93 - 5.03
- 9 Aurigae B
- Right ascension: 05^{h} 06^{m} 41.12083^{s}
- Declination: +51° 35′ 53.2333″
- Apparent magnitude (V): 12.2
- 9 Aurigae C
- Right ascension: 05^{h} 06^{m} 49.17489^{s}
- Declination: +51° 36′ 34.5112″
- Apparent magnitude (V): 9.49

Characteristics

A
- Evolutionary stage: main sequence
- Spectral type: F2V
- U−B color index: −0.01
- B−V color index: +0.34
- Variable type: γ Dor

Astrometry

A
Radial velocity (R_{v})	−0.47±0.57 km/s
Proper motion (μ)	RA: −28.557 mas/yr Dec.: −171.822 mas/yr
Parallax (π)	37.0551±0.1371 mas
Distance	88.0 ± 0.3 ly (26.99 ± 0.10 pc)

B
Proper motion (μ)	RA: −54.582 mas/yr Dec.: −156.009 mas/yr
Parallax (π)	37.0796±0.0631 mas
Distance	88.0 ± 0.1 ly (26.97 ± 0.05 pc)

C
Radial velocity (R_{v})	−1.88±0.17 km/s
Proper motion (μ)	RA: −32.386 mas/yr Dec.: −173.026 mas/yr
Parallax (π)	37.2115±0.0184 mas
Distance	87.65 ± 0.04 ly (26.87 ± 0.01 pc)

Orbit
Period (P)	391.7 d
Eccentricity (e)	0.37
Semi-amplitude (K_{1}) (primary)	5.8 km/s

Details

A
Mass	1.97 M_{☉}
Radius	1.56 R_{☉}
Luminosity	6.042 L_{☉}
Surface gravity (log g)	4.07 cgs
Temperature	7,023 K
Metallicity [Fe/H]	−0.12 dex
Rotational velocity (v sin i)	21.0 km/s

B
Mass	0.49 M_{☉}
Temperature	4,947 K

C
Mass	0.751 M_{☉}
Radius	0.756 R_{☉}
Luminosity	0.162 L_{☉}
Temperature	4,633 K

Other designations
- V398 Aur, BD+51°1024, GJ 187.2, GJ 9174, HD 32537, HIP 23783, HR 1637, SAO 25019

Database references
SIMBAD	9 Aur A
- 9 Aur B
- 9 Aur C

9 Aurigae (9 Aur) is a star system in the constellation Auriga. It has an apparent magnitude of about 5, making it visible to the naked eye in many suburban skies. Parallax estimates made by the Hipparcos spacecraft put it at about 86 light-years (26 parsecs) from the Solar System, although individual Gaia Data Release 3 parallaxes place all three components at 88 light-years.

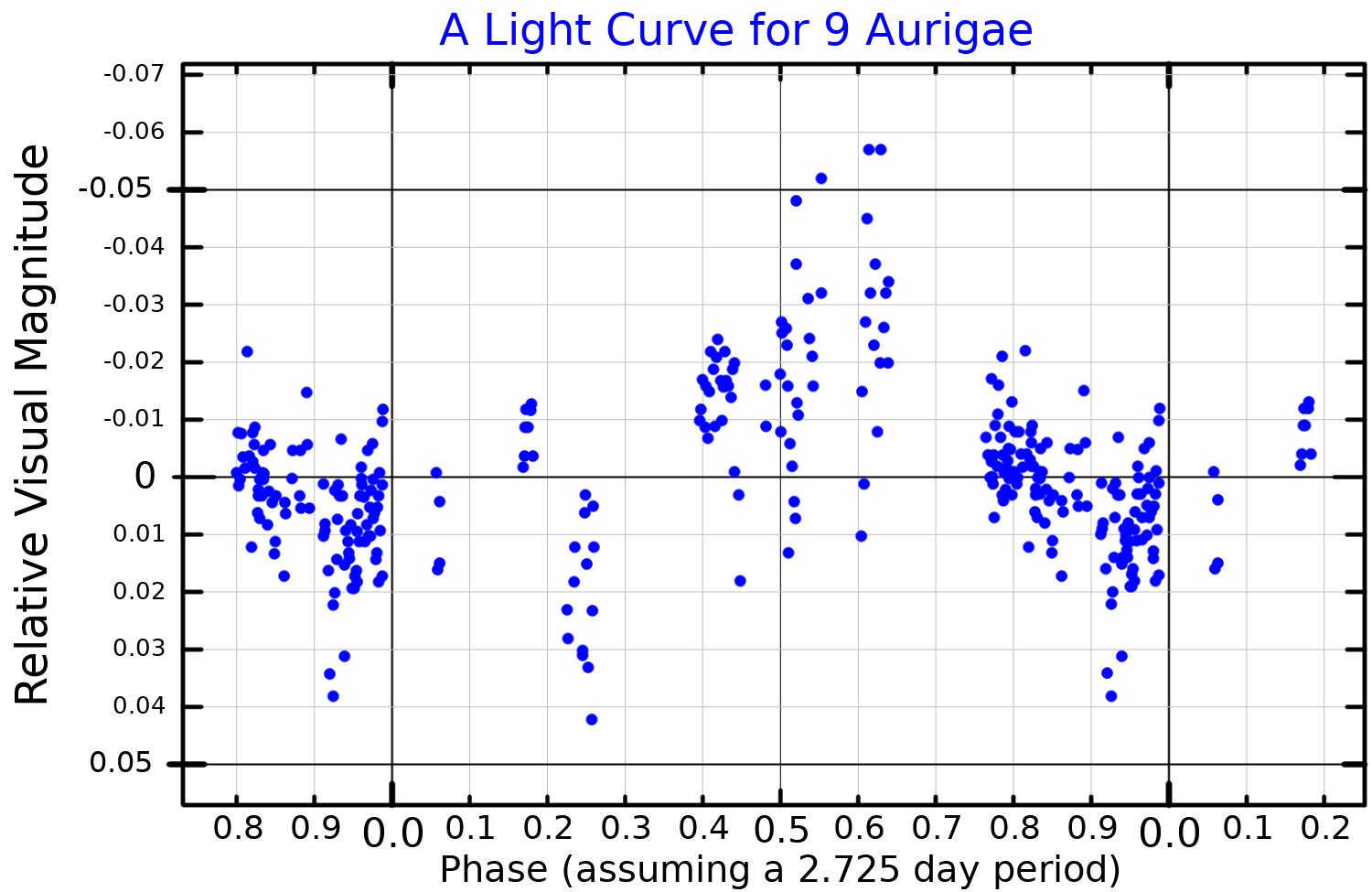
A visual-band light curve for 9 Aurigae, adapted from Krisciunas et al. (1993)

Kevin Krisciunas and Edward Francis Guinan discovered that the star is a variable star in 1990. It is a well-studied Gamma Doradus variable, and was one of the first stars to be so-classified. This star type varies in luminosity due to non-radial pulsations. Its apparent magnitude varies from 4.93 to 5.03 over a period of 1.25804 days. For that reason it was given the variable star designation V398 Aurigae in 1995.

9 Aurigae is a multiple star system. The naked-eye component A is a single-lined spectroscopic binary. Only the signature of an F-type main-sequence star can be seen in the spectrum, but the periodic Doppler shift of the absorption lines demonstrates that there is a hidden companion in a 391.7-day orbit. The gravitational interaction of the two bodies produces variations in their respective motions, which is what creates the Doppler shift.

Four other companions to 9 Aurigae are listed in multiple star catalogs. The closest companion is a 12th-magnitude red dwarf 5″ away. Ninety arcseconds away is component C, a 9th-magnitude star with a spectral class of K5Ve, which may also be a spectroscopic binary. Further separated still is a 14th-magnitude star, component D, proposed to be a more distant red giant, although Gaia astrometry places it at a similar distance and with a similar proper motion. The most widely separated companion is component E, a distant, unrelated star.
