= HD 73752 =

Triple star system in the constellation Pyxis

- Location of HD 73752 (circled)

Observation data Epoch J2000 Equinox ICRS
- Constellation: Pyxis
- Right ascension: 08^{h} 39^{m} 17.89867^{s}
- Declination: −22° 39′ 42.8283″
- Apparent magnitude (V): 5.17 (combined)

Characteristics
- Spectral type: (G5IV + unknown) + K0V or GV
- B−V color index: 0.83
- J−H color index: 0.456
- J−K color index: 0.461

Astrometry
Radial velocity (R_{v})	52.13 ± 0.22 km/s
Proper motion (μ)	RA: −240.319 mas/yr Dec.: 459.973 mas/yr
Parallax (π)	50.9663±0.3068 mas
Distance	64.0 ± 0.4 ly (19.6 ± 0.1 pc)
Absolute magnitude (M_{V})	3.83 (A), 5.28 (B)

Orbit
Primary	HD 73752 Aa
Name	HD 73752 Ab
Period (P)	211.76±0.17 d
Semi-major axis (a)	≥(8.83±0.16)×10^{6} km
Eccentricity (e)	0.210±0.016
Periastron epoch (T)	56372.6±2.7
Argument of periastron (ω) (secondary)	142.9±4.9°

Orbit
Primary	HD 73752 A
Name	HD 73752 B
Period (P)	127 yr
Semi-major axis (a)	1.69" (34 AU)
Eccentricity (e)	0.32
Inclination (i)	167°
Longitude of the node (Ω)	211°
Periastron epoch (T)	1986
Argument of periastron (ω) (secondary)	124°

Details

HD 73752 Aa
Mass	1.21 M_{☉}
Radius	1.68 R_{☉}
Luminosity	2.31 (Note: Calculated from absolute magnitude.) L_{☉}
Surface gravity (log g)	4.07 cgs
Temperature	5680 K
Metallicity [Fe/H]	0.32 dex
Rotational velocity (v sin i)	3.3±0.5 km/s
Age	7 Gyr

HD 73752 B
Mass	1.04 M_{☉}
Radius	1.01 R_{☉}
Luminosity	0.608 L_{☉}
Surface gravity (log g)	4.45 cgs
Temperature	5340 K

Other designations
- BD−22°2345, CD−22°6442, GC 11877, GJ 314, HD 73752, HIP 42430, HR 3430, SAO 176226, PPM 254900, WDS J08391-2240AB, LTT 3202, TIC 118486580, 2MASS J08390794-2239427, WISE J083907.75-223936.6, WISEA J083907.74-223937.4, Gaia DR2 5702029063555481088, Gaia DR3 5702029029197580160, ADS 6914 AB

Database references
SIMBAD	The system
- A
- B

HD 73752 is a multiple star system located in the southern constellation of Pyxis. With an apparent magnitude of 5.17, it can be faintly seen by the naked eye from Earth as a yellow-hued dot of light. As such, it is listed in the Bright Star Catalogue as HR 3430. It is located at a distance of approximately 64.0 light-years (19.6 parsecs) according to Gaia EDR3 parallax measurements, and is receding at a heliocentric radial velocity of 52.13 km/s.

== Physical properties ==
The system is roughly seven billion years old, much older than the Solar System (4.568 Gyr), and belongs to the thin disk population of the Milky Way.

The primary star, HD 73752 Aa, is an aging subgiant, a star that has fused all the hydrogen in its core into helium and evolved past the main sequence, with the spectral type G5IV. It is 21% more massive than the Sun, equivalent to a typical F-type main-sequence star with the spectral type F7V, but has expanded to a radius of 1.68 R_{☉}. It radiates 2.31 times the luminosity of the Sun from its photosphere at an effective temperature of 5,680 K (5,410 °C; 9,760 °F). The entire system is very metal-rich with a metallicity of +0.32, which equates to an iron abundance 10^{0.32} ≈ 2.1 times that of the Sun. A low-mass close companion, Ab, orbits Aa in a 211.76-day (0.5798-year) orbit, but its precise parameters remain uncertain.

The secondary star, which is in a 127-year binary orbit with the Aa/Ab pair, is a G-type or K-type main-sequence star similar to the Sun in mass and radius, but substantially cooler at 5,340 K (5,070 °C; 9,150 °F). As such, it emits only three-fifths the Sun's luminosity.

== Multiplicity ==
HD 73752 has been known to be a close visual binary since 1874. As early as 1943, a third unseen component was suspected, though this suggestion of a ~0.1 M_{☉} object in a 35-year orbit remained inconclusive, and a 1967 study turned up little evidence. Radial velocity variations were observed in 1980 and 2006 that strongly implied a low-mass object, though the orbital parameters could not be obtained. In 2016, HD 73752 A was finally confirmed to be a spectroscopic binary.

Additionally, another possible companion, 13.7 magnitudes fainter than the primary in the H band, was noticed at a separation of 4".50 in right ascension and 6".02 in declination, but this has not been followed up on.

== Circumstellar disc ==
HD 73752 has been referred to as a "Vega-like star," a star that exhibits excess infrared emission due to an optically thin dusty circumstellar disc containing almost no gas. Because this star is past the main sequence, the process in which the emissions are produced may diverge from that of younger such stars e.g., Epsilon Eridani, HD 53143, HD 69830, and HD 98800. In 2012, a debris disc was detected at a distance of 21 AU from the primary, an unstable position close to the secondary star's orbit at 34 AU. Despite this, a 2019 study did not find any significant infrared excess at a wavelength of 70 μm.

== See also ==
- 70 Virginis: a G-type subgiant similar to HD 73752 Aa.
- List of star systems within 60–65 light-years
