= EQ Virginis =

Star in the constellation Virgo

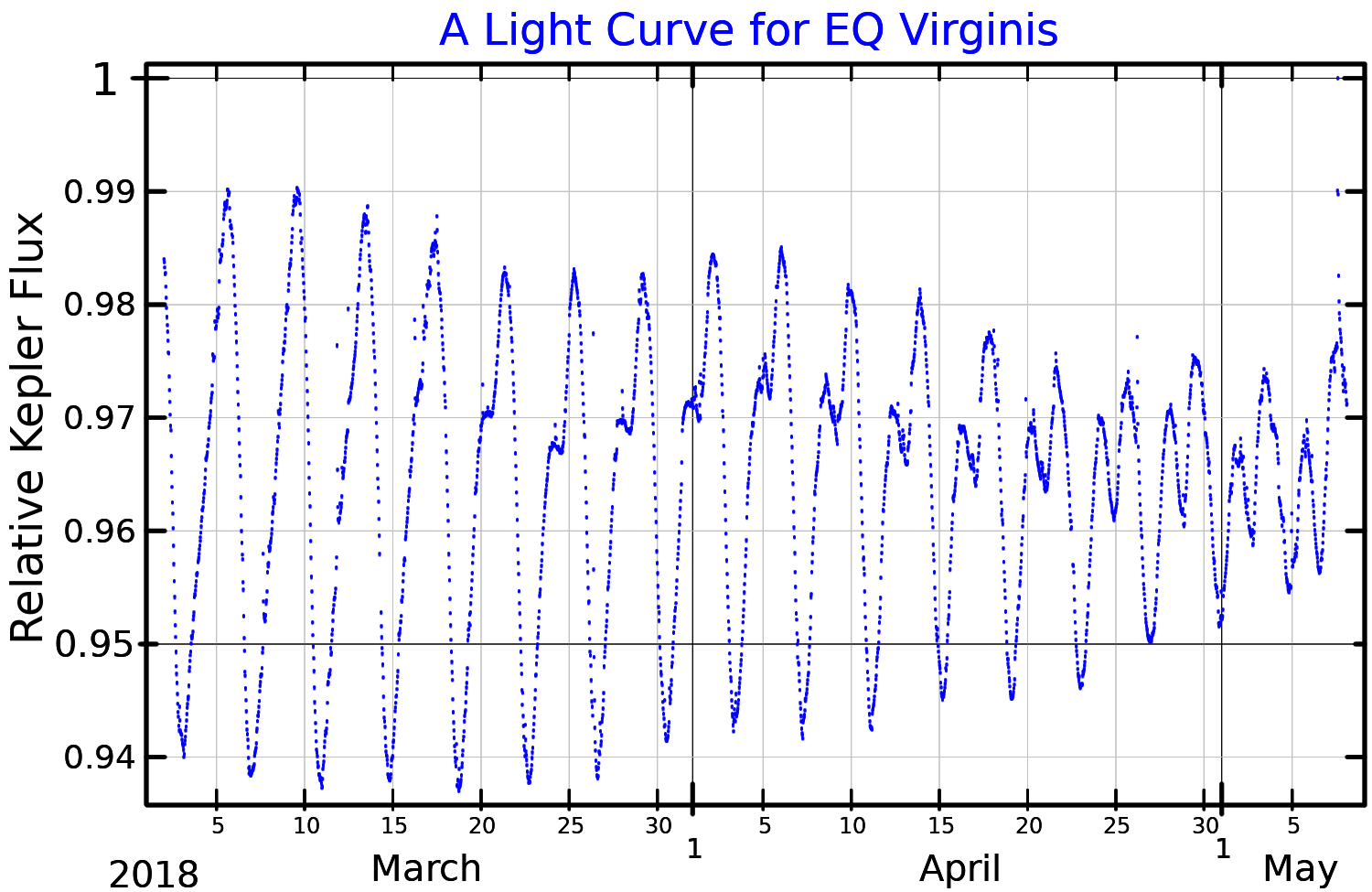
- A light curve for EQ Virginis, plotted from Kepler data

Observation data Epoch J2000 Equinox ICRS
- Constellation: Virgo
- Right ascension: 13^{h} 34^{m} 43.2063^{s}
- Declination: −08° 20′ 31.335″
- Apparent magnitude (V): 9.36

Characteristics
- Evolutionary stage: main sequence
- Spectral type: K5Ve
- Variable type: UV Cet + BY Dra

Astrometry
Radial velocity (R_{v})	−23.16±0.16 km/s
Proper motion (μ)	RA: −286.577±0.110 mas/yr Dec.: −91.866±0.083 mas/yr
Parallax (π)	48.7322±0.0587 mas
Distance	66.93 ± 0.08 ly (20.52 ± 0.02 pc)
Absolute magnitude (M_{V})	10.51

Details
Mass	0.68 M_{☉}
Radius	0.62+0.02 −0.04 R_{☉}
Luminosity	0.136±0.001 L_{☉}
Surface gravity (log g)	4.49 cgs
Temperature	4,224±80 K
Metallicity [Fe/H]	−0.144 dex
Rotation	3.9±0.1 days
Rotational velocity (v sin i)	2.06 km/s
Age	30-50 Myr

Other designations
- EQ Vir, BD−07°3646, GJ 517, HD 118100, HIP 66252, SAO 139419, LTT 5253, PLX 3101, Ross 478

Database references
SIMBAD	data
ARICNS	data

EQ Virginis is a single variable star in the equatorial constellation of Virgo. It has a baseline visual apparent magnitude of 9.36, but is a flare star that undergoes sporadic bursts of brightening. The star is located at a distance of 67 light-years from the Sun based on parallax measurements, but is drifting closer with a radial velocity of −23 km/s. It is a member of the IC 2391 moving group of stars, which is between 30 and 50 million years old.

This is an orange-hued K-type main-sequence star with a stellar classification of K5Ve, where the 'e' suffix indicates emission lines in the spectrum. It is a young, rapidly rotating star with a mean magnetic field strength of 2,500±300 G. In 1971, Sylvio Ferraz-Mello and Carlos Alberto Pinto Coelho de Oliveira Torres discovered that the star, then called HD 118100, is a variable star. It was given its variable star designation, EQ Virginis, in 1972. The star is classified as an eruptive variable of the UV Ceti type and a BY Draconis variable. It shows strong chromospheric activity with extensive star spots that, on average, cover ~24% of the surface. The star displays a strong X-ray emission.
