= HD 43587 =

Stellar system in the constellation Orion

- Location of HD 43587 (circled)

Observation data Epoch J2000.0 Equinox ICRS
- Constellation: Orion
- HD 43587 Aab
- Right ascension: 06^{h} 17^{m} 16.139^{s}
- Declination: +05° 06′ 00.40″
- Apparent magnitude (V): 5.70
- HD 43587 BC
- Right ascension: 06^{h} 17^{m} 10.65^{s}
- Declination: +05° 07′ 02.4″
- Apparent magnitude (V): 13.27 (BC total)

Characteristics
- Spectral type: G0V / M0V / M3.5V / M5V
- B−V color index: 0.610(system total)

Astrometry

HD 43587 Aa
Radial velocity (R_{v})	8.96±0.10 (Note: No value for HD 43587 Aa's radial velocity with correction for the binary orbit seems to be present in literature, so it must be derived by other means. At BJD 2452003.7636, The Keck/HIRES relative radial velocity in orbital fitting was at approximately -2.75 km/s. At BJD 2451981.6466, The Kitt Peak 0.9 AFT absolute radial velocity was 6.21 km/s, with an approximate error of 0.1 km/s. 6.21 km/s - -2.75 km/s = 8.96 km/s, which should be approximately the star's radial velocity. Additionally, an orbital fit including publicly available data from the ELODIE archive finds a value of 8.97 ± 0.03 km/s for the star's intrinsic radial velocity, confirming the value.) km/s
Proper motion (μ)	RA: −187.72±0.37 mas/yr Dec.: +170.69±0.28 mas/yr
Parallax (π)	51.95±0.40 mas
Distance	62.8 ± 0.5 ly (19.2 ± 0.1 pc)

HD 43587 BC
Proper motion (μ)	RA: -198 mas/yr Dec.: 164 mas/yr
Parallax (π)	55.2±1.0 mas
Distance	59 ± 1 ly (18.1 ± 0.3 pc)
Absolute magnitude (M_{V})	12.07 / 14.90

Orbit
Primary	HD 43587 Aa
Name	HD 43587 Ab
Period (P)	32.07 years
Semi-major axis (a)	0.598" (10.8 AU (Note: Semi-major axis in AU = $\frac{semimajor\ axis\ in\ seconds}{parallax\ in\ seconds}\ {{=}}\ \frac{.598}{.0552}$ = 10.8 AU; as the eccentricity is 0.796, the distance fluctuates between 20.4% and 179.6% of that, roughly from 2.21 AU to 19.5 AU.))
Eccentricity (e)	0.796
Inclination (i)	35.6°
Longitude of the node (Ω)	163.1°
Periastron epoch (T)	1998.05
Argument of periastron (ω) (secondary)	75.0°
Semi-amplitude (K_{1}) (primary)	4.323±0.009 km/s

Position (relative to HD 43587 B)
Component	HD 43587 C
Epoch of observation	2453376.0
Angular distance	366±3 mas
Position angle	158±1°

Details
Mass	1.049±0.016 / 0.67±0.04 (Note: This (dynamical) mass is discrepantly large when compared with the derived atmospheric parameters and the photometric mass of 0.54±0.05 M_{☉} derived in the same paper.) / 0.25±0.06 / 0.12±0.02 M_{☉}
Radius	1.15±0.01 R_{☉}
Surface gravity (log g)	4.30±0.01 cgs
Temperature	5,947±17 K
Metallicity [Fe/H]	−0.02±0.02 dex
Age	4.97±0.52 Gyr

Other designations
- HIP 29860, Gliese 231.1, GJ 9208, HR 2251
- HD 43587 Aab: WDS J06173+0506Aa,Ab, LEP 24A
- HD 43587 BC: NLTT 16333, (Note: SIMBAD erroneously lists NLTT 16333 and NAME GJ 231.1 BC as different objects due to the co-ordinates in Pravdo et al. (2006) being seemingly incorrect, but they are in fact the same.) WDS J06173+0506E, LEP 24AE

Database references
SIMBAD	data

HD 43587 is a stellar system approximately 63 light-years away in the constellation of Orion, visible to the naked eye. The system comprises four individual stars, with two widely separated binaries forming a quadruple system.

== Components ==
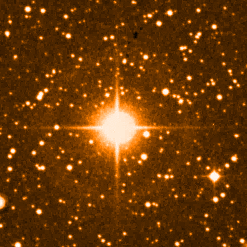
The star

HD 43587, being a bright, nearby, high proper motion solar-type star, has been fairly extensively studied. The star was found to be slightly hotter than the Sun, but has a similar metallicity and is therefore not much more massive.

Searches for companions to the star, among many other stars, were ongoing throughout the last century. HD 43587 did not seem to have a variable radial velocity or much variability in its astrometry which would indicate that it had a close companion. The Washington Double Star Catalog lists four visual companions; companion B, discovered in 1891, has differing proper motion to the primary, so it is unrelated. Companions C and D, discovered in 1911, have only been observed once, making their relationship uncertain at best. However, Companion E, first observed in 1990, has very similar proper motion to the primary, meaning that it is indeed a companion. Designated HD 43587 B, the star was found to be a faint M-dwarf.

Because of the star's brightness and position in the vicinity of the constellation of Monoceros, HD 43587 A was selected as one of the primary COROT astroseismology targets, which would collect information on the star's internal properties.

Since the primary star is similar to the Sun and did not seem to have a close companion, it was targeted by the radial velocity-based planet searches that began at the end of the twentieth century. In particular, HD 43587 A was observed with the Keck/HIRES spectrograph. However, during 1998 the star's radial velocity was found to decrease by about eight km/s, indicative of a long period stellar companion. An orbital fit found that this new companion has an orbital period of about 30 years, but on a very eccentric path which brings it through periastron in about a year. This third star, designated HD 43587 Ab, was found to have a minimum mass of about 0.3 M_{☉}

The long period of HD 43587 Ab coupled with the system being close to the Solar System means that the two components of the primary system would be well separated as viewed from Earth, which made it an attractive target for resolving. This was achieved in 2006 with adaptive optics, and has been achieved since with speckle interferometry.

Meanwhile, HD 43587 B became interesting because it was a little-studied, fairly bright M-dwarf. As of such, it was targeted in the STEPS astrometric survey, which found that the star's motion was deviating from linear motion; adaptive optics observations confirmed that HD 43587 B was itself a binary with a fourth component, HD 43587 C. While the orbital period of the binary was too long to constrain the two components' dynamical masses, photometric analysis found that they were both late M-dwarfs.
