= HD 217107 =

Star in the constellation Pisces

- Location of HD 217107 (circled in red)

Observation data Epoch J2000.0 Equinox ICRS
- Constellation: Pisces
- Right ascension: 22^{h} 58^{m} 15.5408^{s}
- Declination: −02° 23′ 43.383″
- Apparent magnitude (V): +6.17

Characteristics
- Evolutionary stage: subgiant
- Spectral type: G8 IV-V
- B−V color index: 0.744±0.006

Astrometry
Radial velocity (R_{v})	−13.4±0.1 km/s
Proper motion (μ)	RA: −6.819(25) mas/yr Dec.: −15.040(23) mas/yr
Parallax (π)	49.7846±0.0263 mas
Distance	65.51 ± 0.03 ly (20.09 ± 0.01 pc)
Absolute magnitude (M_{V})	4.68

Details
Mass	1.045+0.018 −0.023 M_{☉}
Radius	1.2245±0.0173 R_{☉}
Luminosity	1.20 L_{☉}
Temperature	5391±40 K
Metallicity	0.31
Rotation	39.0 days
Rotational velocity (v sin i)	0.97 km/s
Age	7.13 Gyr

Other designations
- 6 G. Piscium, BD−03°5539, FK5 3836, HD 217107, HIP 113421, HR 8734, SAO 146412, CCDM J22583-0224AB

Database references
SIMBAD	data
Exoplanet Archive	data

HD 217107 (6 G. Piscium) is a yellow subgiant star approximately 65 light-years away from Earth in the constellation of Pisces (the Fish). Its mass is very similar to the Sun's, although it is considerably older. Two planets have been discovered orbiting the star: one is extremely close and completes an orbit every seven days, while the other is much more distant, taking fourteen years to complete an orbit.

== Distance, age, and mass ==
HD 217107 is fairly close to the Sun: the Gaia astrometric satellite measured its parallax as 49.7846 milliarcseconds, which corresponds to a distance of 65.51 light years. Its apparent magnitude is 6.17, making it just barely visible to the naked eye under favourable conditions.

Spectroscopic observations show that its spectral type is G7 or G8, which means its temperature is about 5,400 K. Its mass is roughly the same as the Sun's, although its estimated age of 7.1 billion years is somewhat older than the Sun's 4.6 billion years and it is thought to be evolving away from the main sequence, having consumed almost all the hydrogen in its core in nuclear fusion reactions.

== Planetary system ==
A study of the radial velocity of HD 217107 carried out in 1998 revealed that its motion along the line of sight varied over a 7.1-day cycle. The period and amplitude of this variation indicated that it was caused by a planetary companion in orbit around the star, with a minimum mass slightly greater than that of Jupiter. The companion planet was designated HD 217107 b.

While most planets with orbital periods of less than 10 days have almost circular orbits, HD 217107 b has a somewhat eccentric orbit, and its discoverers hypothesized that this could be due to the gravitational influence of a second planet in the system at a distance of several astronomical units (AU). Confirmation of the existence of a second planet followed in 2005, when long term observations of the star's radial velocity variations revealed a variation on a period of about eight years, caused by a planet with a mass at least twice that of Jupiter in a very eccentric orbit with a semimajor axis of about 4.3 AU. The second planet was designated HD 217107 c.

In 2025, the use of astrometry allowed the inclinations and true masses of the planets to be found. The inclinations are nearly edge-on, so the minimum masses are close to the real ones.

The HD 217107 planetary system
Companion (in order from star)	Mass	Semimajor axis (AU)	Orbital period (days)	Eccentricity	Inclination (°)	Radius
b	1.446+0.180 −0.067 M_{J}	0.07359+0.00042 −0.00053	7.12687±0	0.1284+0.0015 −0.0014	93+25 −26	—
c	4.37+0.13 −0.10 M_{J}	5.922+0.035 −0.044	5,138±11	0.3918+0.0064 −0.0067	88+14 −12	—

== See also ==
- List of exoplanets discovered before 2000 - HD 217107 b
- List of exoplanets discovered between 2000–2009 - HD 217107 c
