= HD 219623 =

Star in the constellation Cassiopeia

- Location of HD 219623 (circled in red)

Observation data Epoch J2000.0 Equinox ICRS
- Constellation: Cassiopeia
- Right ascension: 23^{h} 16^{m} 42.304^{s}
- Declination: +53° 12′ 48.51″
- Apparent magnitude (V): 5.58

Characteristics
- Evolutionary stage: main sequence
- Spectral type: F7 V
- U−B color index: +0.02
- B−V color index: +0.556±0.003

Astrometry
Radial velocity (R_{v})	−27.22±0.12 km/s
Proper motion (μ)	RA: 112.461 mas/yr Dec.: −236.554 mas/yr
Parallax (π)	48.5197±0.0463 mas
Distance	67.22 ± 0.06 ly (20.61 ± 0.02 pc)
Absolute magnitude (M_{V})	4.02

Details
Mass	1.215 M_{☉}
Radius	1.1950±0.0359 R_{☉}
Luminosity	1.9987±0.0265 L_{☉}
Surface gravity (log g)	4.24±0.07 cgs
Temperature	6,138±42 K
Metallicity [Fe/H]	+0.07±0.03 dex
Rotational velocity (v sin i)	5.50 km/s
Age	1.2 Gyr

Other designations
- BD+52°3410, GJ 4324, HD 219623, HIP 114924, HR 8853, SAO 35285

Database references
SIMBAD	data

HD 219623 is a solitary star in the northern circumpolar constellation of Cassiopeia. HD 219623 is its Henry Draper Catalogue designation. It has an apparent visual magnitude of 5.59, which lies in the brightness range that is visible to the naked eye. According to the Bortle scale, it can be observed from dark suburban skies. Parallax measurements place it at an estimated distance of around 67.2 light years. It has a relatively high proper motion, advancing 262 mas per year across the celestial sphere.

This star has a stellar classification of F7 V, indicating that it is an F-type main-sequence star that is generating energy at its core through the thermonuclear fusion of hydrogen into helium. It is larger than the Sun, with 120% of the Sun's radius and 122% of the solar mass; as such, it shines nearly twice as brightly as the Sun. HD 219623 is around 1.2 billion years in age, with a projected rotational velocity of 5.5 km/s. Compared to the Sun, it has a slightly higher abundance of elements other than hydrogen and helium—what astronomers term the star's metallicity. The effective temperature of the stellar atmosphere is about 6,138 K, giving it the yellow-white hued glow of an ordinary F-type star.

In 2006, this star was examined using the MIPS instrument on the Spitzer Space Telescope. An infrared excess at a wavelength of 70 μm was detected with 3-σ certainty. The data suggests the presence of circumstellar disk of orbiting dust, which is likely being replenished via debris from comets or asteroids. The temperature of this dust indicates the inner edge of the disk annulus comes to within 0.4 AU of the host star, while the outer edge extends out to around 22 AU.

In 2024, evidence for a candidate planet around HD 219623 was found based on HIRES observations, which showed periodic radial velocity variations that are unlikely to be caused by intrinsic stellar activity.

The HD 219623 planetary system
Companion (in order from star)	Mass	Semimajor axis (AU)	Orbital period (days)	Eccentricity	Inclination (°)	Radius
.01 (unconfirmed)	≥49.3+7.5 −7.3 M_{🜨}	0.255+0.0062 −0.0065	48.481+0.046 −0.038	0.21+0.14 −0.13	—	—
