= HD 192263 =

Star in the constellation Aquila

HD 192263 / Phoenicia
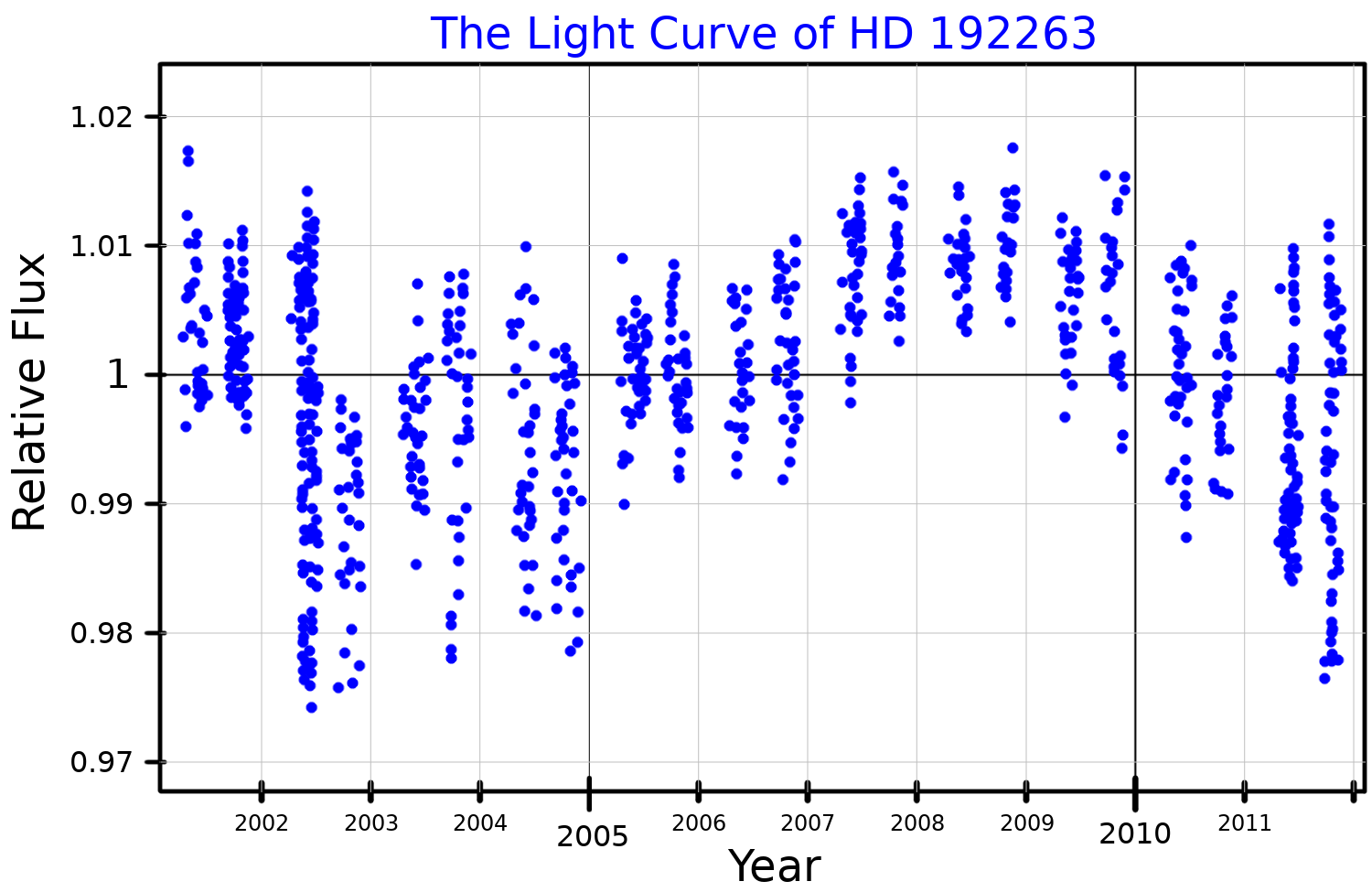
- The b+y band light curve for HD 192263, adapted from Dragomir et al. (2012)

Observation data Epoch J2000 Equinox ICRS
- Constellation: Aquila
- Right ascension: 20^{h} 13^{m} 59.8456^{s}
- Declination: −00° 52′ 00.770″
- Apparent magnitude (V): 7.79

Characteristics
- Spectral type: K1/2 V
- B−V color index: 0.938±0.015
- Variable type: BY Draconis variable

Astrometry
Radial velocity (R_{v})	−10.67±0.09 km/s
Proper motion (μ)	RA: −62.730(23) mas/yr Dec.: 260.819(17) mas/yr
Parallax (π)	50.9432±0.0230 mas
Distance	64.02 ± 0.03 ly (19.630 ± 0.009 pc)
Absolute magnitude (M_{V})	6.36

Details
Mass	0.65±0.09 M_{☉}
Radius	0.74±0.02 R_{☉}
Luminosity	0.295+0.014 −0.013 L_{☉}
Surface gravity (log g)	4.51 cgs
Temperature	4,955 K
Metallicity [Fe/H]	+0.08 dex
Rotational velocity (v sin i)	2.1 km/s
Age	6.6+4.7 −4.4 Gyr

Other designations
- Phoenicia, V1703 Aquilae, BD−01°3925, HD 192263, HIP 99711, SAO 144192, LTT 8003, NLTT 48902

Database references
SIMBAD	data
Exoplanet Archive	data
ARICNS	data

HD 192263, also named Phoenicia, is a star with an orbiting exoplanet in the equatorial constellation of Aquila. The system is located at a distance of 64 light-years from the Sun based on parallax measurements, and is drifting further away with a radial velocity of −10.7 km/s. It has an absolute magnitude of 6.36, but at that distance the apparent visual magnitude is 7.79. It is too faint to be viewed with the naked eye, but with good binoculars or small telescope it should be easy to spot.

In the late 1990s, Klaus G. Strassmeier et al. discovered that HD 192263 is a variable star while conducting a search for stars that would be good candidates for Doppler imaging. It was given its variable star designation, V1703 Aquilae, in 2006.

The spectrum of HD 192263 matches a K-type main-sequence star, an orange dwarf, with a stellar classification of K1/2 V This is a BY Draconis variable, with variations in luminosity being caused by star spots on a rotating stellar atmosphere. It has a high level of magnetic activity in its chromosphere. The star is being viewed almost equator-on, with a projected rotational velocity of 2 km/s. It has 65% of the mass of the Sun, 74% of the Sun's radius, and is roughly 6.6 billion years old. The star is radiating 30% of the luminosity of the Sun from its photosphere at an effective temperature of 4,955 K.

The star HD 192263 is named Phoenicia. The name was selected in the NameExoWorlds campaign by Lebanon, during the 100th anniversary of the IAU. Phoenicia was an ancient thalassocratic civilisation of the Mediterranean that originated from the area of modern-day Lebanon.

Various companions for the star have been reported, but all of them are probably line-of-sight optical components or just spurious observations.

== Planetary system ==
On 28 September 1999, an exoplanet around HD 192263 was found by the Geneva Extrasolar Planet Search team using the CORALIE spectrograph on the 1.2m Euler Swiss Telescope at La Silla Observatory, discovered independently by Vogt et al. The exoplanet is named Beirut after the capital and largest city of Lebanon.

The HD 192263 planetary system
Companion (in order from star)	Mass	Semimajor axis (AU)	Orbital period (days)	Eccentricity	Inclination (°)	Radius
b / Beirut	≥0.733±0.015 M_{J}	0.15312±0.00095	24.3587±0.0022	0.008±0.014	—	—

== See also ==
- List of exoplanets discovered before 2000 - HD 192263 b / Beirut
