= HD 123 =

Triple star system in the constellation Cassiopeia

- Location of HD 123 (circled)

Observation data Epoch J2000 Equinox ICRS
- Constellation: Cassiopeia
- HD 123A
- Right ascension: 00^{h} 06^{m} 15.81387^{s}
- Declination: +58° 26′ 12.1073″
- Apparent magnitude (V): 6.42
- HD 123B
- Right ascension: 00^{h} 06^{m} 15.71057^{s}
- Declination: +58° 26′ 12.6457″
- Apparent magnitude (V): 7.32

Characteristics
- Spectral type: G3V + (G8V + early MV)
- B−V color index: 0.70 (A), 0.97 (B)

Astrometry

HD 123A
Radial velocity (R_{v})	−11.7±2 km/s
Proper motion (μ)	RA: +237.578 mas/yr Dec.: +37.174 mas/yr
Parallax (π)	48.1027±0.0398 mas
Distance	67.80 ± 0.06 ly (20.79 ± 0.02 pc)
Absolute magnitude (M_{V})	+4.76

HD 123B
Radial velocity (R_{v})	−16.0±5 km/s
Proper motion (μ)	RA: +284.761 mas/yr Dec.: +37.687 mas/yr
Parallax (π)	47.0168±0.1936 mas
Distance	69.4 ± 0.3 ly (21.27 ± 0.09 pc)
Absolute magnitude (M_{V})	+5.66

Orbit
Primary	HD 123A
Name	HD 123B
Period (P)	106.83 yr
Semi-major axis (a)	1.455±0.004" (29.5±0.6 AU)

Orbit
Primary	HD 123Ba
Name	HD 123Bb
Period (P)	47.685±0.003 d
Eccentricity (e)	0.610±0.024
Periastron epoch (T)	MJD 49891.00±0.22
Argument of periastron (ω) (secondary)	290±4°

Details

HD 123A
Mass	0.98 M_{☉}
Radius	1.05 R_{☉}
Luminosity	1.08 L_{☉}
Surface gravity (log g)	4.41 cgs
Temperature	5,751 K
Metallicity [Fe/H]	0.09 dex
Rotation	4.47 days
Rotational velocity (v sin i)	6.1 km/s
Age	5.01 Gyr

HD 123Ba
Mass	~0.86 (Note: Assuming an orbital inclination of 30°. If the A/B and Ba/Bb orbits are coplanar, the masses of Ba and Bb would be ~0.95 M_{☉} and ~0.22 M_{☉}, respectively, which would make Ba too massive to be as dim compared to A.) M_{☉}
Radius	~0.87 (assumed) R_{☉}
Rotational velocity (v sin i)	4.7 km/s

HD 123Bb
Mass	~0.31 M_{☉}

Other designations
- V640 Cassiopeiae, AG+58°10, BD+57°2865, GC 88, GJ 4.1, GJ 9001, HD 123, HIP 518, HR 5, SAO 21085, PPM 25002, ADS 61 AB, CCDM J00063+5826AB, WDS J00063+5826AB, G 243-13, LTT 10022, NLTT 213, TIC 347304641, 2MASS J00061575+5826128, WISEA J000616.14+582613.3
- HD 123A: TIC 604446831, TYC 3664-1986-1
- HD 123B: TIC 604446820, TYC 3664-1986-2

Database references
SIMBAD	HD 123
- HD 123A
- HD 123B

HD 123 is a hierarchical triple star system in the deep northern constellation of Cassiopeia. It consists of a visual binary between HD 123A and B, of which component B is itself a spectroscopic binary (Ba & Bb). Through the use of a telescope, the visual pair can be resolved, with a separation that varies between 0.5 and 1.6 arcseconds. With a combined apparent magnitude of 5.98, it is faintly visible to the naked eye under dark skies as a yellow-hued star. The system is located approximately 70 light-years (21 pc) distant according to Hipparcos parallax measurements, while the Gaia DR3 parallaxes for the individual stars point towards slightly closer distances of 67.8 ly (20.8 pc) and 69.4 ly (21.3 pc), respectively. It is trending closer towards the Solar System at a heliocentric radial velocity of −13.79 km/s.

== Designation ==
Its name, HD 123, denotes that it is the 123rd object in the Henry Draper Catalogue, included within the first volume published in 1918. Alternate designations include HR 5, ADS 61, as well as the variable-star designation V640 Cassiopeiae, which was given in 1985 after it was reported to fluctuate in brightness with a one-day period in 1983, but this was refuted in 1999 as the star was shown to be constant.

== Properties ==
The visible components, A and Ba, are both G-type main-sequence stars like the Sun but slightly less massive, A being the brighter, hotter, and more massive of the two. Weber & Strassmeier (1998) assumed a radius of 0.87 R_{☉} for B, corresponding to a typical late G-type star. One of the G stars exhibit high chromospheric activity while the other is quiescent, (Note: The source does not specify which of the stars is which.) an oddity seen in some other solar-like binaries such as HD 137763/HD 137778, 37 Ceti, and Zeta Reticuli. Bb, on the other hand, is thought to be a red dwarf, having approximately three-tenths the mass of the Sun.

The A and B components have an orbital period of 106.83 years spaced about 30 AU apart, while B itself consists of the pair Ba/Bb, which revolve around each other every 47.685 days in an eccentric orbit (eccentricity 0.610).

== Observational history ==
On 25 May 1782, astronomer William Herschel discovered that HD 123 was a double star, which he designated H I 39. He remarked that the two stars appeared "red," referring to a late spectral type in modern terms. F. G. W. Struve was the second to observe the object from the 1820s through the 1830s, correctly noting that the stars bore a yellowish hue. Owing to the rapidly shifting position angle, a solution for the visual orbit was calculated as early as 1841, and had been refined to near-modern values by 1867, with an obtained period of 106.83 years and an eccentricity of ~0.45. The large proper motion of the star was noticed in 1869, which, even then, was seen as an indication of its relatively close distance from Earth. However, it took until the 1960s for a solid consensus to emerge on its parallax, which was determined to be close to 0.050 arcseconds.

=== Multiplicity of HR 5B ===
The possibility that HR 5 may be composed of more than two stars was raised by several authors such as Volet (1937), who suggested a 22-year secondary orbital period (though admitted it was unconvincing), and Dorrit Hoffleit, who noted in the 1982 edition of the Bright Star Catalogue that a 6.9-year period companion to B may exist. In 1951, H. Roth argued that component B was multiple, since the mass ratio indicated that B was apparently more massive despite being fainter. This was followed up by Lippincott (1963), refining the ratio M_{B}/(M_{A}+M_{B}) to 0.546 ± 0.006, which meant B was about 20% more massive than A. (Note: Calculated M_{B}/M_{A} using M_{B}/(M_{A}+M_{B})=0.546.) This has been used in subsequent studies, such as Griffin (1999) who derived a total mass of the Ba/Bb pair of 1.17 M_{☉}.

=== Alleged variability ===
In 1983, Brettman et al. reported that HR 5 was a variable star with a period of 1.082 ± 0.002 days. They were unable to distinguish which of the visible components displayed this variability, but theorized that one of them could be either a rapidly rotating star with unevenly distributed starspots, or a spectroscopic binary with a 1.082-day period. Weber & Strassmeier (1998) additionally found radial velocity variations in HR 5B with a period of 1.026 days, and reasoned that Ba must be the variable component. In 1999, however, a comprehensive study by Griffin showed that the star exhibited no signs of photometric variability and that while the radial velocity variations of component B did exist, the reported one-day period was an alias of the true period of 47.685 days. The AAVSO lists HD 123 as a reflection variable (a binary system in which brightness variations are seen because one component reflects light from the other) with the small brightness range of magnitude 5.966 to 5.981.
