= G 185-32 =

White dwarf in the constellation Vulpecula

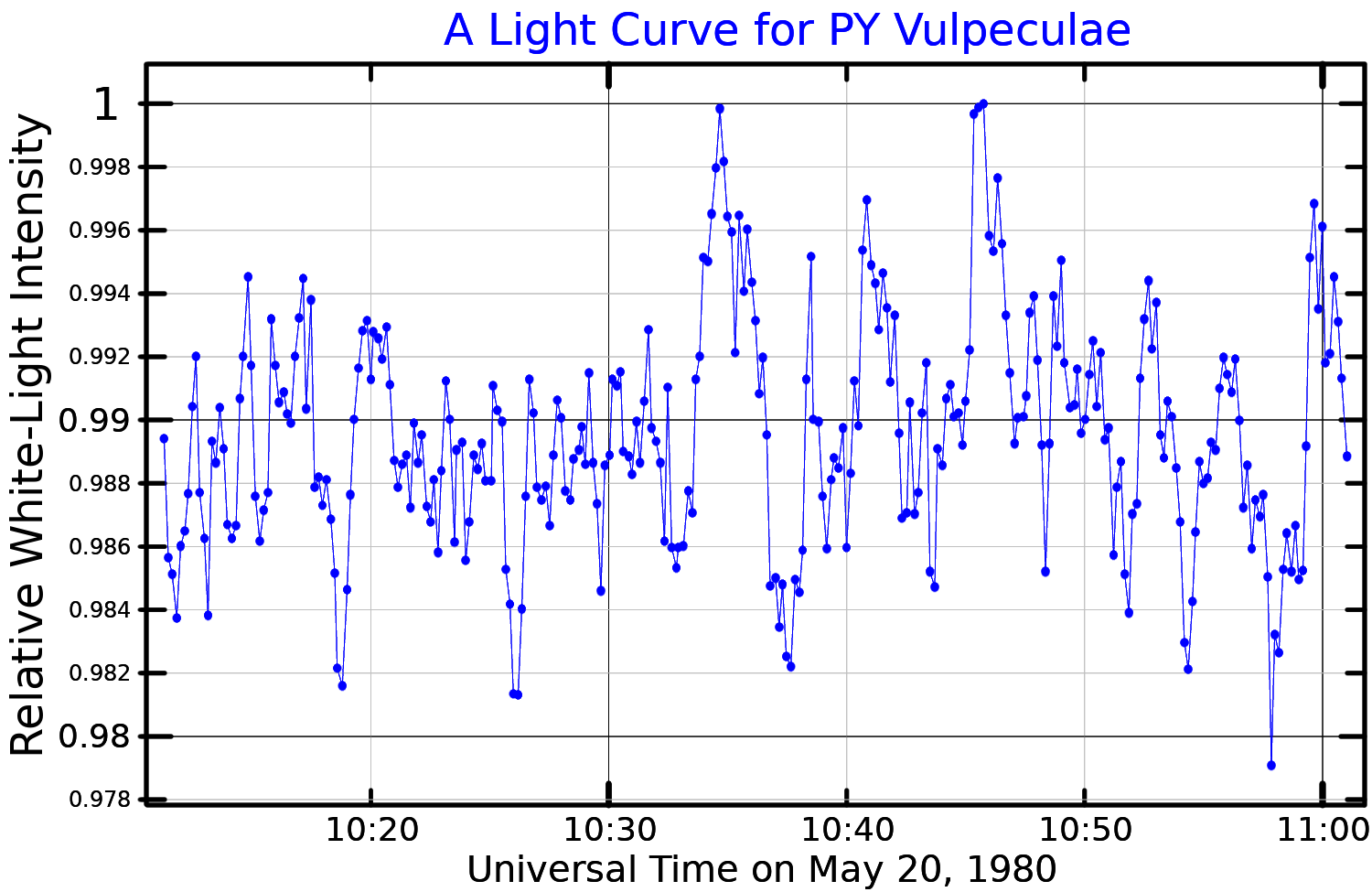
- A light curve for PY Vulpeculae, adapted from McGraw et al. (1981)

Observation data Epoch J2000 Equinox ICRS
- Constellation: Vulpecula
- Right ascension: 19^{h} 37^{m} 13.7502^{s}
- Declination: +27° 43′ 18.737″
- Apparent magnitude (V): 13.00

Characteristics
- Spectral type: DA4.0
- Apparent magnitude (J): 13.183±0.023
- Apparent magnitude (H): 13.213±0.029
- Apparent magnitude (K): 13.329±0.043
- B−V color index: 0.17
- Variable type: ZZA

Astrometry
Proper motion (μ)	RA: 439.597±0.044 mas/yr Dec.: 21.270±0.049 mas/yr
Parallax (π)	54.7742±0.0288 mas
Distance	59.55 ± 0.03 ly (18.257 ± 0.010 pc)
Absolute magnitude (M_{V})	11.66

Details
Mass	0.64±0.10 M_{☉}
Radius	0.0120±0.0006 R_{☉}
Surface gravity (log g)	8.09±0.05 cgs
Temperature	12381±186 K

Other designations
- PY Vul, EGGR 277, LSPM J1937+2743, USNO-B1.0 1177-00513805, WD 1935+276, USNO 352, WD 1935+27, NLTT 48026, GJ 1241, PG 1935+276.

Database references
SIMBAD	data
ARICNS	data

G 185-32, also known by the variable star designation PY Vulpeculae, is a white dwarf in the constellation Vulpecula. Located approximately 18.3 parsecs (60 ly) distant, the stellar remnant is a ZZ Ceti variable, varying by 0.02 apparent magnitudes from the mean of 13.00.

== Observational history ==
This star was first noticed during a survey for high proper motion stars by Henry L. Giclas, at Lowell Observatory, who listed it as a suspected white dwarf. The white dwarf designation was confirmed spectroscopically in 1970 by astronomer Jesse L. Greenstein of the California Institute of Technology. Observations made by John McGraw et al. during 1979 and 1980 showed that G 185-32 is a variable star. It was given its variable star designation in 1985.
