= 74 Orionis =

Single star in the constellation Orion

- Location of 74 Orionis (circled in red)

Observation data Epoch J2000 Equinox ICRS
- Constellation: Orion
- Right ascension: 06^{h} 16^{m} 26.61911^{s}
- Declination: +12° 16′ 19.7876″
- Apparent magnitude (V): 5.04

Characteristics
- Evolutionary stage: main sequence
- Spectral type: F5V
- U−B color index: −0.02
- B−V color index: +0.42

Astrometry
Radial velocity (R_{v})	+9.17 km/s
Proper motion (μ)	RA: +82.775 mas/yr Dec.: +186.480 mas/yr
Parallax (π)	51.0518±0.0969 mas
Distance	63.9 ± 0.1 ly (19.59 ± 0.04 pc)
Absolute magnitude (M_{V})	3.62

Details
Mass	1.39 M_{☉}
Radius	1.3 R_{☉}
Luminosity	3.02 L_{☉}
Surface gravity (log g)	4.34 cgs
Temperature	6,595 K
Metallicity [Fe/H]	−0.03 dex
Rotational velocity (v sin i)	18.8 km/s
Age	2.316 Gyr

Other designations
- k Ori, 74 Ori, BD+12°1084, FK5 1169, GC 8033, GJ 9207, HD 43386, HIP 29800, HR 2241, SAO 95476, CCDM J06165+1216A, WDS J06164+1216A, LTT 11823

Database references
SIMBAD	data

74 Orionis is a single star in the equatorial constellation of Orion. It has the Bayer designation k Orionis, while 74 Orionis is the Flamsteed designation. This object is visible to the naked eye as a faint, yellow-white hued point of light with an apparent visual magnitude of 5.04. It is located at a distance of 64 light years from the Sun based on parallax, and is drifting further away with a radial velocity of +9 km/s. The star has a relatively high proper motion, traversing the celestial sphere at the rate of 0.204 arc seconds per annum.

This object is an ordinary F-type main-sequence star with a stellar classification of F5V. It is an estimated 2.3 billion years old and is spinning with a projected rotational velocity of 18.8 km/s. The star has 1.4 times the mass of the Sun and 1.3 times the Sun's radius. Metallicity is near solar, which indicates it has a Sun-like abundance of elements. The star is radiating three times the luminosity of the Sun from its photosphere at an effective temperature of 6,595 K.

74 Orionis has two visual companions: component B, with magnitude 12.5 and separation 32.1", and C, with magnitude 9.0 and separation 195.5".
