= Gamma Doradus =

Star in the constellation Dorado

- Location of γ Doradus (circled in red)

Observation data Epoch J2000.0 Equinox J2000.0 (ICRS)
- Constellation: Dorado
- Right ascension: 04^{h} 16^{m} 01.58662^{s}
- Declination: −51° 29′ 11.9327″
- Apparent magnitude (V): 4.25

Characteristics
- Evolutionary stage: Main sequence
- Spectral type: F1V
- U−B color index: +0.03
- B−V color index: +0.30
- R−I color index: +0.16
- Variable type: γ Dor

Astrometry
Radial velocity (R_{v})	+25.2±0.5 km/s
Proper motion (μ)	RA: +100.502 mas/yr Dec.: +184.180 mas/yr
Parallax (π)	48.9494±0.1689 mas
Distance	66.6 ± 0.2 ly (20.43 ± 0.07 pc)
Absolute magnitude (M_{V})	2.72

Details
Mass	1.56±0.06 M_{☉}
Radius	1.67±0.07 R_{☉}
Luminosity	6.52±0.25 L_{☉}
Surface gravity (log g)	4.19±0.09 cgs
Temperature	7,139±132 K
Metallicity [Fe/H]	+0.05±0.14 dex
Rotational velocity (v sin i)	56.6±0.5 km/s
Age	0.535–1.207 Gyr

Other designations
- γ Dor, CD−51°1066, CPD−51°524, FK5 157, GC 5179, GJ 167.1, GJ 9150, HD 27290, HIP 19893, HR 1338, SAO 233457, PPM 333343

Database references
SIMBAD	data

Gamma Doradus is the third-brightest star in the southern constellation of Dorado. Its name is a Bayer designation that is Latinized from γ Doradus and abbreviated Gamma Dor or γ Dor. This star is faintly visible to the naked eye with an apparent visual magnitude of approximately 4.25, and is a variable star, the prototype of the class of Gamma Doradus variables. It is located at a distance of 67 light-years from the Sun based on parallax measurements, and is drifting further away with a radial velocity of +25 km/s. Based on its motion through space, it appears to be a member of the IC 2391 supercluster.

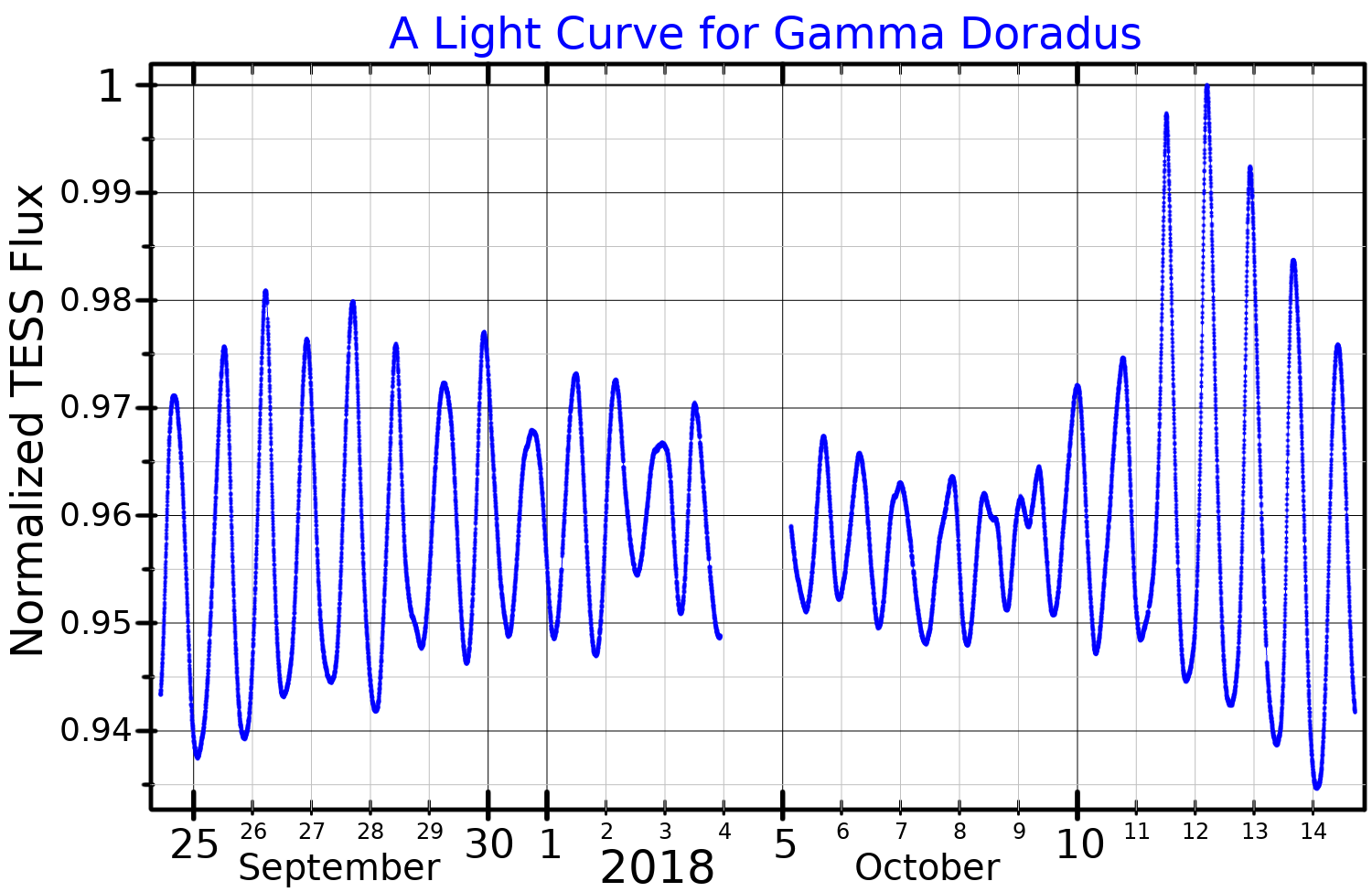
A light curve for Gamma Doradus, plotted from TESS data

This is an F-type main-sequence star with a stellar classification of F1V. It is a pulsating variable that varies in brightness by less than a tenth of a magnitude owing to nonradial gravity wave oscillations. Four pulsation frequencies have been identified with periods of 17.6, 12.8, 16.3, and 18.2 hours. The star is around 0.5–1.2 billion years old and is spinning with a projected rotational velocity of 57 km/s. It has 1.6 times the mass of the Sun and 1.7 times the Sun's radius. The star is radiating 6.5 times the luminosity of the Sun from its photosphere at an effective temperature of 7,139 K.

An infrared excess has been detected at multiple frequencies, indicating that the star is being orbited by a pair of debris disks.
