= QW Puppis =

F3V star in the constellation Puppis

- Location of QW Puppis (circled)

Observation data Epoch J2000 Equinox ICRS
- Constellation: Puppis
- Right ascension: 07^{h} 12^{m} 33.62514^{s}
- Declination: −46° 45′ 33.4966″
- Apparent magnitude (V): 4.49

Characteristics
- Spectral type: F3V Fe-1.0
- U−B color index: −0.01
- B−V color index: +0.32
- Variable type: γ Dor

Astrometry
Radial velocity (R_{v})	+0.10 km/s
Proper motion (μ)	RA: −135.806 mas/yr Dec.: +107.433 mas/yr
Parallax (π)	46.9031±0.1185 mas
Distance	69.5 ± 0.2 ly (21.32 ± 0.05 pc)
Absolute magnitude (M_{V})	2.84

Details
Mass	1.52 M_{☉}
Radius	1.735 R_{☉}
Luminosity	6.4 L_{☉}
Surface gravity (log g)	4.17 cgs
Temperature	6,934 K
Metallicity [Fe/H]	−0.24 dex
Rotational velocity (v sin i)	51 km/s
Age	1.6 Gyr

Other designations
- I Puppis, QW Pup, CD−46°2977, FK5 275, GC 9569, GJ 268.1, GJ 9225, GSC 08119-02547, HIP 34834, HR 2740, HD 55892, SAO 218537

Database references
SIMBAD	data

QW Puppis (QW Pup) is a class F3V (yellow-white dwarf) star in the constellation Puppis. Its apparent magnitude is 4.49 and it is approximately 69.5 light years away based on parallax.

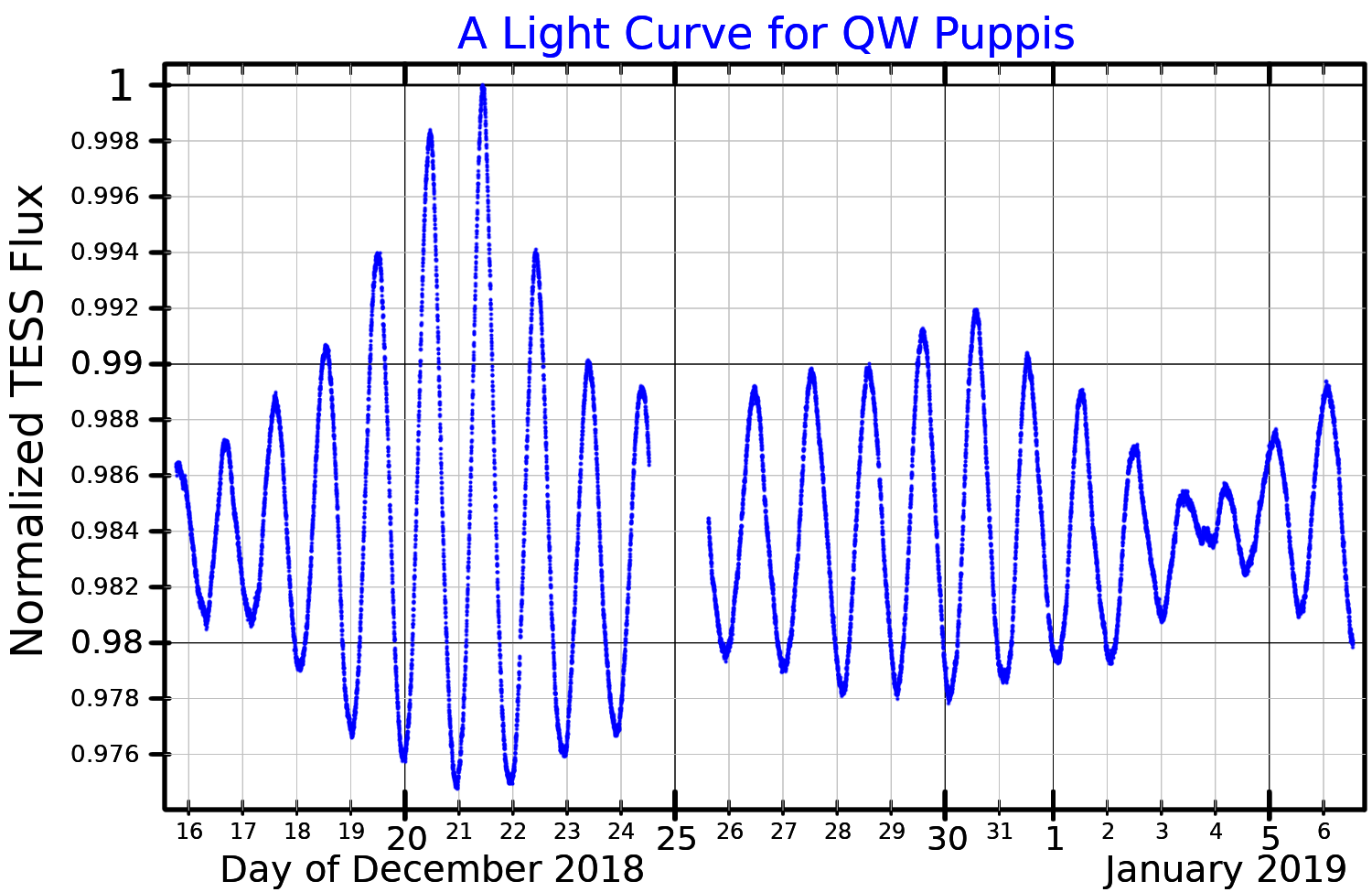
A light curve for QW Puppis, plotted from TESS data

It is a Gamma Doradus variable, ranging from 4.5 to 4.47 magnitude with a period of 0.96 days. With a mass of 1.5 M_{☉} and an age of 1.6 billion years, it is about halfway through its main sequence lifetime.
