= Gamma Doradus variable =

Type of variable star

Gamma Doradus variables are variable stars which display variations in luminosity due to non-radial pulsations of their surface. The stars are typically young, early F or late A type main sequence stars, and typical brightness fluctuations are 0.1 magnitudes with periods on the order of one day. This class of variable stars is relatively new, having been first characterized in the second half of the 1990s, and details on the underlying physical cause of the variations remains under investigation.

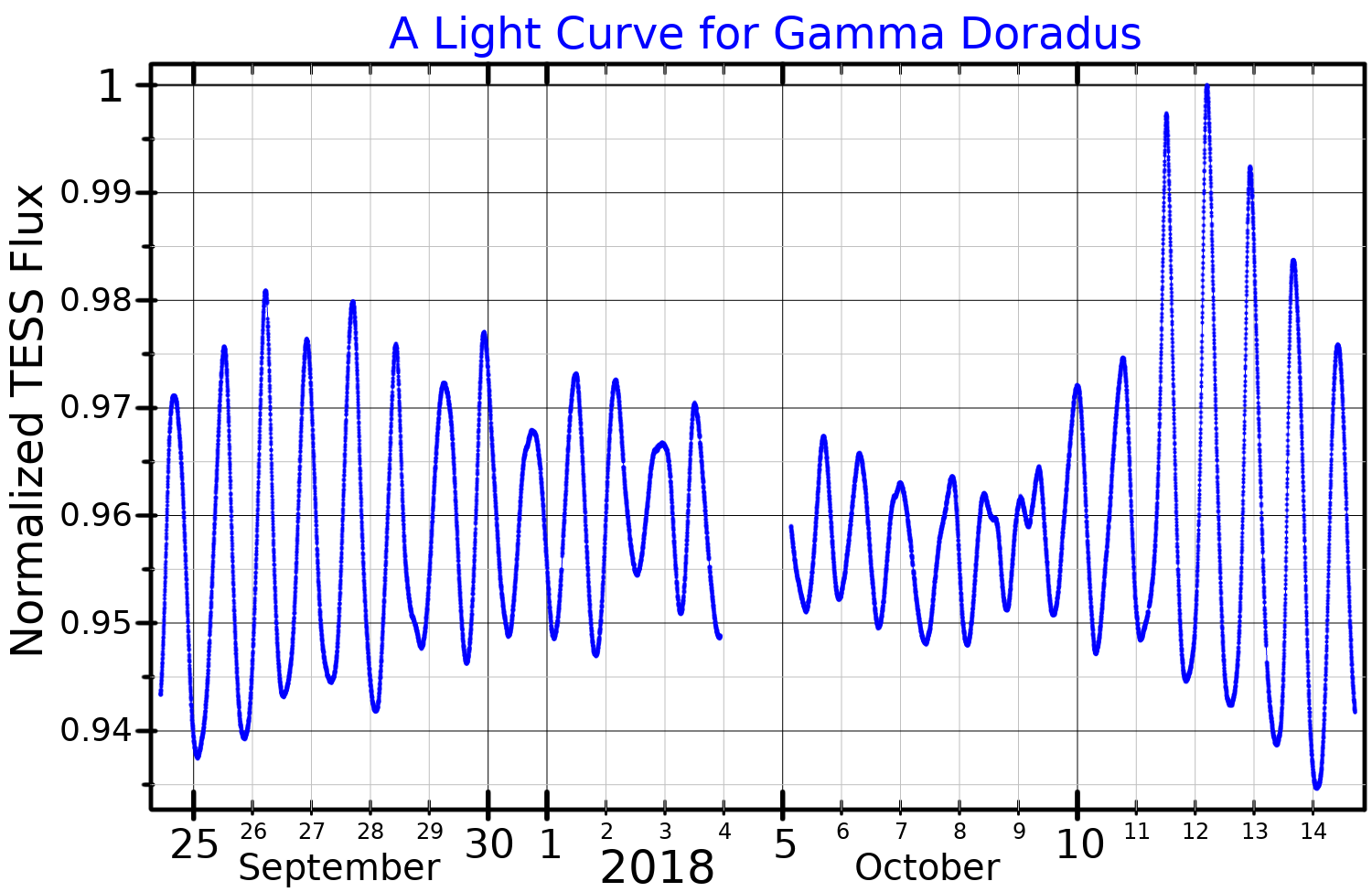
A light curve for Gamma Doradus, the class prototype, plotted from TESS data

The star 9 Aurigae was first noticed to be variable in 1990. However, none of the currently-accepted explanations were adequate: it pulsated too slowly and was outside of the Delta Scuti instability strip, and there was no evidence for any eclipsing material, although Gamma Doradus and HD 96008 were noted to be similar. These three stars, as well as HD 224638, were soon hypothesized to belong to a new class of variable stars in which variability was produced by g-mode pulsations rather than the p-mode pulsations of Delta Scuti variables. HD 224945 and HD 164615 were noticed to be similar as well, while HD 96008 was ruled out on the basis of its more regular period. Eclipses and starspots were soon ruled out as the cause of the Gamma Doradus' variability, and the variability of 9 Aurigae was confirmed to be caused by g-mode pulsations a year later, thus confirming the stars as the prototypes of a new class of variable stars. Over ten more candidates were quickly found, and the discoverers dubbed the group the Gamma Doradus stars, after the brightest member and the first member found to be variable.

== List ==
Designation (name)	Constellation	Discovery	Maximum Apparent magnitude (m_{V})	Minimum Apparent magnitude (m_{V})	Period (days)	Spectral class	Comment
HD 8801 A (V529 And)	Andromeda	Henry & Fekel (2005)	6^{m}.48 (Hipparcos)	6^{m}.51 (Hipparcos)	0.40331	A7Vm	First discovered hybrid Gamma Doradus/Delta Scuti variable
V872 Ara	Ara	Aerts et al. (1998)	6^{m}.37 (Hipparcos)	6^{m}.39 (Hipparcos)	0.4266	A9V	
9 Aur A	Auriga	Krisciunas (1993)	4^{m}.93	5^{m}.50	1.2582	F2V	One of the original stars classified
17 CVn	Canes Venatici	Henry et al. (2011)	5^{m}.91		0.8862	F0:V	Spectroscopic binary; unclear which component is variable
HD 108100 (DD CVn)	Canes Venatici	Breger et al. (1996)	7^{m}.15		0.7541	F2V	
V350 CMa A	Canis Major	Eyer & Aerts (2000)	6^{m}.18	6^{m}.27	0.7750; 10.959	F2V	Has two distinct periods
V1026 Cen	Centaurus	Aerts et al. (1998)	9^{m}.33 (Hipparcos)	9^{m}.38 (Hipparcos)	1.1857	A3:m	
HD 17163	Cetus	Henry et al. (2011)	6^{m}.04		0.42351	F1V	
HD 14940 (EP Cet)	Cetus	Aerts et al. (1998)	6^{m}.74	6^{m}.77	0.5004	F0IV/V	
43 Cyg	Cygnus	Henry et al. (2005)	5^{m}.75 (Hipparcos)	5^{m}.84 (Hipparcos)	0.79955	F0V	
γ Dor	Dorado	Krisciunas (1993)	4^{m}.23	4^{m}.27	0.7570	F1V	One of the original stars classified
8 Dra	Draco	Aerts et al. (1998)	5^{m}.26 (Hipparcos)	5^{m}.34 (Hipparcos)	0.42450	F1VmA7(n)	
DI Gru	Grus	Aerts et al. (1998)	8^{m}.68	8^{m}.76	0.8668	F3IV	
V1325 Her	Hercules	Kaye et al. (1998)	6^{m}.38		0.4210	F0V	
80 Leo	Leo	Henry & Fekel (2002)	6^{m}.34	6^{m}.37	0.45286	F3IV	
HD 40745 (AC Lep)	Lepus	Aerts et al. (1998)	6^{m}.28 (Hipparcos)	6^{m}.30 (Hipparcos)	0.82427	F2IV	
HD 69682	Lynx	Henry et al. (2011)	6^{m}.50		0.53189	A9V	
DO Lyn	Lynx	Kaye et al. (1999)	7^{m}.17		0.62447	F0V	
HD 50747	Monoceros	Dolez et al. (2009)	5^{m}.45		4.865; 0.956	A4IV	Triple star; unknown which component is variable
HD 49434	Monoceros	Bruntt et al. (2002)	5^{m}.75		0.57644	F1V	Hybrid Gamma Doradus/Delta Scuti variable
HD 41547 A	Monoceros	Henry et al. (2007)	5^{m}.87		0.81123	F4V	
α Oph (Rasalhague)	Ophiuchus	Monnier et al. (2010)	2^{m}.08		0.5850	A5IV	Hybrid Gamma Doradus/Delta Scuti variable
73 Oph A	Ophiuchus	Fekel & Henry (2003)	6^{m}.11 (B)		0.61439	F0V+G1V	
HD 164615 (V2118 Oph)	Ophiuchus	Mantegazza et al. (1994)	7^{m}.02	7^{m}.09	0.8117	F2IV	One of the original stars classified
V2502 Oph	Ophiuchus	Aerts et al. (1998)	6^{m}.57	6^{m}.67	1.307	F2V	
HD 38309 Aa	Orion	Henry et al. (2011)	6^{m}.09		0.37703	F0III:n	
NZ Peg	Pegasus	Henry et al. (2001)	5^{m}.83 (Hipparcos)	5^{m}.86 (Hipparcos)	0.41113	F2V	
HR 8799 (V342 Peg)	Pegasus	Rodriguez & Zerbi (1995)	6^{m}.00 (Hipparcos)	6^{m}.06 (Hipparcos)	0.5053	A5V	Lambda Boötis star and Vega-like star
V372 Peg	Pegasus	Kaye et al. (1998)	6^{m}.53 (B)		2.594821	F3V	
39 Peg	Pegasus	Henry et al. (2005)	6^{m}.43	6^{m}.53	0.75574	F1V	
HD 224638 (BT Psc)	Pisces	Krisciunas (1993)	7^{m}.8 (B)		1.2323	F0V	One of the original stars classified
HD 224945 (BU Psc)	Pisces	Mantegazza et al. (1994)	6^{m}.93		0.5432	A9V	One of the original stars classified
QW Pup	Puppis	Poretti et al. (1997)	4^{m}.47	4^{m}.50	0.9584	F0IV/V	
ι TrA A	Triangulum Australe	Aerts et al. (1998)	5^{m}.30 (Hipparcos)	5^{m}.42 (Hipparcos)	1.4556	F4IV	
EE Tuc	Tucana	Aerts et al. (1998)	6^{m}.72 (Hipparcos)	6^{m}.82 (Hipparcos)	0.6935	F2IV	
V349 Tel	Telescopium	Aerts et al. (1998)	7^{m}.60 (Hipparcos)	7^{m}.73 (Hipparcos)	0.6953	F0V	
KO UMa	Ursa Major	Kaye et al. (1999)	7^{m}.18		0.7691	F2V	
UY UMi	Ursa Minor	Aerts et al. (1998)	6^{m}.30 (Hipparcos)	6^{m}.38 (Hipparcos)	0.7237	F2V	
VX UMi	Ursa Minor	Henry et al. (2001)	6^{m}.48 (B)		0.34510	A9V	
ε^{1} Lyr B	Lyrae	Peretto I., Lora S., Peretto G., Furlato G., Barbieri M. - MarSEC (2022)	6^{m}.00 V (0.032) TESS		0.415	F0V	
