= List of exoplanets discovered in 2012 =

This is a List of exoplanets discovered in 2012. For exoplanets detected only by radial velocity, the mass value is actually a lower limit. (See Minimum mass for more information)

Name	Mass (M_{J})	Radius (R_{J})	Period (days)	Semi-major axis (AU)	Temp. (K)	Discovery method	Distance (ly)	Host star mass (M_{☉})	Host star temp. (K)	Remarks
75 Ceti b	3		691.9	2.1		radial vel.	266	2.49	4846	
BD+20 274 b	4.2		578.2	1.3		radial vel.	4500±300	0.8	4296	
BD+48 740 b	1.7±0.7		733^{+5}_{−8}	1.7±0.1		radial vel.	2214±72	1.09±0.16	4534±8	Confirmed in 2018.
CoRoT-21b	2.26	1.3	2.72	0.0417	1867	transit	4600±900	1.29	6200	
Epsilon Coronae Borealis b	6.7		417.9	1.3		radial vel.	229.7	1.7	4406	
Gliese 676 Ad	0.014		3.6005	0.0413±0.0014		radial vel.	52.29±0.03	0.71±0.04	3734	
Gliese 676 Ae	0.025		35.39	0.187±0.007		radial vel.	52.29±0.03	0.71±0.04	3734	
Gliese 3470 b	0.043	0.346	3.3366487	0.031		radial vel.	82	0.51	3652	
HAT-P-34b	7.01	1.35	5.45265	0.06774	1520	transit	818.94	4.26	6442	Proper name Ġgantija
HAT-P-35b	7.52	3.55	3.64671	0.0498	1581	transit	1677	23.56	6096	
HAT-P-36b	1.8482	1.277	1.32734683	0.0241	1781	transit	968.49	1.03	5620	Proper name Bran
HAT-P-37b	1.169	1.178	2.797436	0.0379	1271	transit	1341	0.93	5500	Additional planets in system are suspected
HAT-P-38b	0.267	0.825	4.640382	0.0523		transit	810	0.89	5330	Proper name Hiisi
HAT-P-39b	0.599	1.571	3.54387	0.0509		transit	2090	1.4	6430	
HAT-P-40b	0.615	1.73	4.457243	0.0608		transit	1630	1.51	6080	Proper name Vytis
HAT-P-41b	0.8	1.685	2.694047	0.0426		transit	1120	1.42	6390	
HAT-P-42b	1.044	1.28	4.641878	0.0575	1427	transit	1460	1.18	5743	Proper name Iolaus
HAT-P-43b	0.662	1.281	3.332687	0.0443	1361	transit	1770	1.05	5645	
HATS-1b	1.855	1.302	3.446459	0.0444		transit	990	0.99	5870	
HD 142 c	5.3		6005	6.8		radial vel.	83.6	1.23	6245	
HD 4732 b	2.37		360.2	1.19		radial vel.	184	1.74	4959	
HD 4732 c	2.37		2732	4.6		radial vel.	184	1.74	4959	
HD 5608 b	1.4		792.6	1.9		radial vel.	189.7	1.55	4854	
HD 24040 b	4.10±0.12		3490±25	4.637±0.067		radial vel.	152.3±0.4	1.14±0.02	5917±52	Suspected since 2006
HD 27631 b	1.45		2208	3.25		radial vel.	145.3	0.94	5737	
HD 37605 c	3.366		2720	3.814		radial vel.	139.9	1	5448	
HD 40307 e	0.0110±0.0044		34.62^{+0.21}_{−0.20}	0.1886^{+0.083}_{−0.0104}		radial vel.	41.8	0.77	4956	Disputed planet.
HD 40307 f	0.0164		51.76	0.247		radial vel.	41.8	0.77	4956	
HD 40307 g	0.0223		197.8	0.6		radial vel.	41.8	0.77	4956	Disputed planet.
HD 66141 b	6		480.5	1.2		radial vel.	261.1	1.1	4323	
HD 77338b	0.05		5.7361	0.0614		radial vel.	134.6	0.93	5370	
HD 79498 b	1.34		1807	2.98		radial vel.	159.89	1.08	5748	
HD 98649 b	6.8		4951	5.6		radial vel.	139.5	1	5759	
HD 106515 Ab	9.61		3630	4.59		radial vel.	118.6	0.97	5362	
HD 150706 b	2.71		5894	6.7		radial vel.	88.8	1.17	5961	
HD 159868 c	0.73		352.3	1		radial vel.	171.9	1.09	5558	
HD 166724 b	3.53		5144	5.42		radial vel.	140.2	0.81	5127	
HD 197037 b	0.79		1035.7	2.07		radial vel.	107.1	1.063±0.022	6137±20	
HD 207832 b	0.56		161.97	0.57		radial vel.	180.4	0.94	5710	Suspected false positive
HD 207832 c	0.73		1155.7	2.112		radial vel.	180.4	0.94	5710	Suspected false positive
HD 208527 b	9.9		875.5	2.1		radial vel.	1148.4	1.6	4035	
HD 219077 b	10.39		5501	6.22		radial vel.	95	1.05	5362	
HD 219415 b	1		2093.3	3.2		radial vel.	553.7	1	4820	
HD 220074 b	11.1		672.1	1.6		radial vel.	942.7	1.2	3935	
HD 220689 b	1.06		2209	3.36		radial vel.	147.5	1.04	5921	
HD 220773 b	1.45		3724.7	4.94		radial vel.	159.82	1.16	5940	
HD 222155 b	2.12		3999	5.14		radial vel.	165.3	1.21	5701	
HW Virginis b	14.3		4640	4.69		timing	590	0.485		Likely false positive
Kappa Andromedae b	13.616			55	1850	imaging	169.7	2.6	10900	Has a reddish color, and may be a brown dwarf
KELT-1b	27.23	1.11	1.217514	0.02466	2423	transit	850	1.32	6518	
KELT-2Ab	1.522	1.286	4.1137912	0.05496		transit	405.2	1.31	6151	
Kepler-30b	0.036	0.348	29.33434	0.18		transit	4600	0.99	5498	
Kepler-30c	2.01	1.097	60.323105	0.3		transit	4600	0.99	5498	
Kepler-30d	0.073	0.785	143.34394	0.5		transit	4600	0.99	5498	
Kepler-32d		0.241	22.7802	0.13		transit	990	0.58	3900	
Kepler-32e		0.134	2.896	0.033		transit	990	0.58	3900	Weak evidence
Kepler-32f		0.073	0.74296	0.013		transit	990	0.58	3900	Weak evidence
Kepler-33f	0.03036	0.398	41.02902	0.2535		transit	4086	1.29	5904	
Kepler-34b	0.22	0.764	288.822	1.0896		transit	4889	1.05	5913	
Kepler-35b	0.127	0.728	131.458	0.60347		transit	5365	0.89	5606	
Kepler-36b	0.014	0.133	13.83989	0.1153		transit	1500	1.07	5911	
Kepler-36c	0.025	0.328	16.23855	0.1283		transit	1500	1.07	5911	
Kepler-38b	0.384	0.384	105.599	0.4632		transit	2000	0.94	5623	
Kepler-46b	6	0.808	33.60134	0.1968		transit	2790	0.9	5309	
Kepler-46c	0.376		57.011	0.2799		timing	2790	0.9	5309	
Kepler-47b	2	0.27	49.532	0.2962		transit	4900	1.05	5636	
Kepler-47c	28	0.411	303.137	0.991		transit	4900	1.05	5636	
Kepler-48b	0.0124	0.168	4.778			transit	1009±5	0.88	5194	
Kepler-48c	0.04597	0.242	9.67395			transit	1009±5	0.88	5194	
Kepler-49b	0.98	0.243	7.2037945			transit	1024±8	0.55	4252	
Kepler-49c	0.72	0.227	10.9129343			transit	1024±8	0.55	4252	
Kepler-50b		0.153	7.81254	0.077		transit	821±6	1.24	6225	
Kepler-50c		0.194	9.37647	0.087		transit	821±6	1.24	6225	
Kepler-51b	0.007	0.633	45.154	0.2514	543	transit	2610±50	1.04	6018	
Kepler-51c	0.013	0.803	85.312	0.384	439	transit	2610±50	1.04	6018	
Kepler-52b	8.7	0.187	7.8773565			transit	1058±7	0.54	4263	
Kepler-52c	10.41	0.164	16.3850021			transit	1058±7	0.54	4263	
Kepler-53b	18.41	0.258	18.6489525			transit	4600±200	0.98	5858	
Kepler-53c	15.74	0.283	38.5583038			transit	4600±200	0.98	5858	
Kepler-54b	0.92	0.187	8.0109434			transit	893±9	0.51	4252	
Kepler-54c	0.37	0.11	12.0717249			transit	893±9	0.51	4252	
Kepler-55b	1.49	0.217	27.9481449			transit	1920±30	0.62	4503	
Kepler-55c	1.11	0.197	42.1516418			transit	1920±30	0.62	4503	
Kepler-56b	0.07	0.581	10.5016	0.1028		transit	3060±80	1.32	4840	
Kepler-56c	0.57	0.874	21.40239	0.1652		transit	3060±80	1.32	4840	
Kepler-57b	18.86	0.195	5.7293196	0.057		transit	3140±30	0.83	5145	
Kepler-57c	6.95	0.138	11.6092567	0.092	631	transit	3140±30	0.83	5145	
Kepler-58b	1.39	0.248	10.2184954			transit	3250±80	0.95	6099	
Kepler-58c	2.19	0.255	15.5741568			transit	3250±80	0.95	6099	
Kepler-59b	2.05	0.098	11.8681707			transit	3925±75	1.04	6074	
Kepler-59c	1.37	0.177	17.9801235			transit	3925±75	1.04	6074	
Kepler-60b	0.01318	0.153	7.1334			transit	3440±70	1.04	5905	
Kepler-60c	0.01211	0.17	8.9187			transit	3440±70	1.04	5905	
Kepler-60d	0.01309	0.178	11.8981			transit	3440±70	1.04	5905	
Kepler-64b	0.531	0.551	138.317	0.652		transit	6200±1000	1.53	6407	Quadruple star system
Kepler-79b	0.0343	0.31	13.4845	0.117	868	transit	3430±60	1.17	6174	
Kepler-79c	0.019	0.332	27.4029	0.187	685	transit	3430±60	1.17	6174	
Kepler-80b	0.0218	0.238	7.05246	0.0648		transit	1160	0.73	4540	
Kepler-80c	0.02121	0.244	9.52355	0.0792		transit	1160	0.73	4540	
Kepler-81b		0.216	5.955		646	transit	1147±10	0.64	4500	
Kepler-81c		0.211	12.04		513	transit	1147±10	0.64	4500	
Kepler-82b		0.357	26.444		581	transit	3030±80	0.85	5428	
Kepler-82c		0.477	51.538		464	transit	3030±80	0.85	5428	
Kepler-83b		0.252	9.77			transit	1320±17	0.66	4648	
Kepler-83c		0.211	20.09			transit	1320±17	0.66	4648	
Kepler-84b		0.199	8.726		937	transit	4700±500	1	6031	
Kepler-84c		0.211	12.883		821	transit	4700±500	1	6031	
Kepler-85b		0.176	8.306			transit	2550±50	0.92	5436	KOI-2038
Kepler-85c		0.194	12.513			transit	2550±50	0.92	5436	KOI-2038
MOA-2011-BLG-293Lb	2.4^{+1.4}_{−0.9}			1.0±0.1		microlensing	23000±2000	0.675±0.525		
MOA-2010-BLG-073Lb	11			1.21		microlensing	9100	0.16		Possibly brown dwarf
MOA-2010-BLG-477Lb	1.4±0.3			2.8±0.5		microlensing	7500±2000	0.53±0.11	5950±150	White dwarf host star
MOA-bin-1Lb	3.7±2.1			8.3^{+4.5}_{−2.7}		microlensing	17000	0.75^{+0.33}_{−0.41}		
Mu2 Octantis b	6.9		3638	5.02		radial vel.	142.1	1.29	6017	
Nu Ophiuchi b	24		530.32	1.9		radial vel.	152.8	3.04	4928	Brown dwarf or small star
Nu Ophiuchi c	27		3186	6.1		radial vel.	152.8	3.04	4928	Brown dwarf or small star
OGLE-2012-BLG-0026Lb	0.145			4		microlensing	13110	1.06		
OGLE-2012-BLG-0026Lc	0.86			4.8		microlensing	13110	1.06		
Omicron Coronae Borealis b	1.5		187.83	0.83		radial vel.	274.1	2.13	4749	
Omicron Ursae Majoris b	4.1		1630	3.9		radial vel.	183.7	3.09	5242	
Pr0201 b	0.54		4.4264			radial vel.	610	1.23	6174	In Beehive Cluster
Pr0211 b	1.88		2.1461	0.03176		radial vel.	610	0.94	5300	Multi-planet system In Beehive Cluster
RR Caeli b	3.0±0.3		1900±40	5.2±0.1		timing	69.10±0.03	0.18+0.44	3100+7540	Circumbinary planet around red and white dwarfs.
WASP-42b	0.527	1.122	4.9816819	0.0561	1021±19	transit	520	0.95	5315	
WASP-47b	1.21	1.15	4.16071	0.052	1275	transit	650	1.11	5576	
WASP-49b	0.378	1.115	2.7817387	0.0379	1369±39	transit	550	0.94	5600	
WASP-52b	0.46	1.27	1.7497798	0.0272	1315±35	transit	460	0.87	5000	Proper name Göktürk
WASP-54b	0.636	1.653	3.6936411	0.04987	1742^{+49}_{−69}	transit	650	1.21	6100	
WASP-55b	0.627	1.335	4.4656291	0.0558	1290	transit	1100	1.16	6070	
WASP-56b	0.571	1.092	4.617101	0.05458	1200	transit	830	1.03	5600	
WASP-57b	0.644	1.05	2.83891856	0.03769	1338±29	transit	1480	0.89	5600	
WASP-58b	0.89	1.37	5.01718	0.0561	1270±80	transit	980	0.94	5800	
WASP-59b	0.863	0.775	7.919585	0.0697	670±35	transit	410	0.72	4650	
WASP-60b	0.514	0.86	4.3050011	0.0531	1479±35	transit	1300	1.08	5900	Proper name Vlasina
WASP-61b	2.06	1.24	3.8559	0.0514	1565±35	transit	1600	1.22	6320	
WASP-62b	0.57	1.39	4.411953	0.0567	1329.6±44.8	transit	520	1.25	6280	Proper name Krotoa
WASP-63b	0.38	1.43	4.37809	0.0574	1536±37	transit	1100	1.32	5570	
WASP-64b	1.271	1.271	1.5732918	0.02648	1989^{+87}_{−88}	transit	1100	1	5400	Proper name Agouto
WASP-66b	2.32	1.39	4.086052	0.0546	1790±60	transit	1200	1.3	6580	
WASP-67b	0.42	1.4	4.61442	0.0517	1050	transit	730	0.87	5240	
WASP-71b	2.242	1.46	2.9036747	0.04619	2016.1^{+67.0}_{−52.5}	transit	1130	1.56	6059	Proper name Tanzanite
WASP-72b	1.5461	1.27	2.2167421	0.03708	2210^{+120}_{−130}	transit	1100	1.39	6250	Proper name Cuptor
WASP-77Ab	1.76	1.21	1.3600309	0.024	1715	transit	300	1	5500	Orbiting primary star of binary star system
WASP-78b	0.89	1.7	2.17517632	0.0362	2350	transit	1800	1.17	6100	
WASP-79b	0.9	2.09	3.6623866	0.0535	1900±50	transit	780	1.38	6600	Proper name Pollera
WISE 1217+1626 B	22	0.934		8	450	imaging	29±3	0.03	575	Brown dwarf
WTS-1b	4.01	1.49	3.352057	0.047	1500±100	transit	8100±1000	1.2	6250	

== Specific exoplanet lists ==
Lists of exoplanets

- List of directly imaged exoplanets
- List of exoplanet extremes
- List of exoplanet firsts
- List of exoplanets discovered by the Kepler space telescope
- List of exoplanets observed during Kepler's K2 mission
- List of exoplanets discovered by the TESS mission
- List of terrestrial exoplanet candidates for atmosphere detection
- List of hottest exoplanets
- List of coldest exoplanets
- List of multiplanetary systems
- List of circumbinary planets
- List of nearest exoplanets
- List of nearest terrestrial exoplanet candidates
- List of potentially habitable exoplanets
- List of proper names of exoplanets
- List of largest exoplanets
- List of smallest exoplanets
- List of transiting exoplanets
- List of exoplanets and planetary debris around giant stars
- List of exoplanets and planetary debris around white dwarfs
- List of extrasolar planetary collisions

=== Lists of exoplanets by year of discovery ===
- List of exoplanets discovered before 2000 (31)
- List of exoplanets discovered between 2000–2009 (376)
- List of exoplanets discovered in 2010 (109)
- List of exoplanets discovered in 2011 (178)
- List of exoplanets discovered in 2012 (147)
- List of exoplanets discovered in 2013 (149)
- List of exoplanets discovered in 2014 (869)
- List of exoplanets discovered in 2015 (144)
- List of exoplanets discovered in 2016 (1497)
- List of exoplanets discovered in 2017 (152)
- List of exoplanets discovered in 2018 (300)
- List of exoplanets discovered in 2019 (169)
- List of exoplanets discovered in 2020 (256)
- List of exoplanets discovered in 2021 (253)
- List of exoplanets discovered in 2022 (312)
- List of exoplanets discovered in 2023 (304)
- List of exoplanets discovered in 2024 (284)
- List of exoplanets discovered in 2025 (239)
- List of exoplanets discovered in 2026 (351)
