= List of stars in Tucana =

This is the list of notable stars in the constellation Tucana, sorted by decreasing brightness.

Name	B	Var	HD	HIP	RA	Dec	vis. mag.	abs. mag.	Dist. (ly)	Sp. class	Notes
α Tuc	α		211416	110130	22^{h} 18^{m} 30.18^{s}	−60° 15′ 34.2″	2.87	−1.05	199	K3III	Lang-Exster, astrometric binary
γ Tuc	γ		219571	114996	23^{h} 17^{m} 25.81^{s}	−58° 14′ 09.3″	3.99	2.28	72	F1III	
(47 Tuc)	ξ				00^{h} 24^{m} 05.54^{s}	–72° 04′ 53.2″	4.09		14500		
ζ Tuc	ζ		1581	1599	00^{h} 20^{m} 01.91^{s}	−64° 52′ 39.4″	4.23	4.56	28	F9V	Sun-like star
κ Tuc	κ		7788	5896	01^{h} 15^{m} 45.50^{s}	−68° 52′ 34.5″	4.25	2.70	67	F6IV	quadruple star, suspected variable
β^{1} Tuc	β^{1}		2884	2484	00^{h} 31^{m} 32.56^{s}	−62° 57′ 29.1″	4.34		135	B9V	component of the β Tuc system
ε Tuc	ε		224686	118322	23^{h} 59^{m} 54.91^{s}	−65° 34′ 37.5″	4.49	−0.81	374	B9IV	
δ Tuc	δ		212581	110838	22^{h} 27^{m} 19.87^{s}	−64° 57′ 59.0″	4.50	−0.06	267	B8V	suspected variable, V_{max} = 4.46^{m}, V_{min} = 4.50^{m}
β^{2} Tuc	β^{2}		2885	2487	00^{h} 31^{m} 33.36^{s}	−62° 57′ 55.6″	4.51		168	A2V	component of the β Tuc system
ν Tuc	ν		213442	111310	22^{h} 33^{m} 00.01^{s}	−61° 58′ 55.5″	4.91	0.30	273	M4III	semiregular variable, V_{max} = 4.75^{m}, V_{min} = 4.93^{m}
η Tuc	η		224392	118121	23^{h} 57^{m} 34.97^{s}	−64° 17′ 53.1″	5.00	1.56	159	A1V	
β^{3} Tuc	β^{3}		3003	2578	00^{h} 32^{m} 43.79^{s}	−63° 01′ 53.0″	5.09		149	A0V	component of the β Tuc system
HD 212330			212330	110649	22^{h} 24^{m} 56.19^{s}	−57° 47′ 47.8″	5.31	3.75	67	F9V	
ι Tuc	ι		6793	5268	01^{h} 07^{m} 18.57^{s}	−61° 46′ 30.9″	5.36	0.70	279	G5III	semiregular variable
ρ Tuc	ρ		4089	3330	00^{h} 42^{m} 28.30^{s}	−65° 28′ 05.3″	5.38	2.33	133	F6V	
λ^{2} Tuc	λ^{2}		5457	4293	00^{h} 55^{m} 00.30^{s}	−69° 31′ 37.1″	5.45	1.40	210	G7III	
π Tuc	π		1685	1647	00^{h} 20^{m} 39.04^{s}	−69° 37′ 29.7″	5.50	0.64	306	B9V	
HD 225253			225253	377	00^{h} 04^{m} 41.25^{s}	−71° 26′ 12.7″	5.59	−0.63	572	B8III	
HD 220572			220572	115620	23^{h} 25^{m} 19.37^{s}	−56° 50′ 56.2″	5.60	0.89	285	K0III	
HD 220790			220790	115769	23^{h} 27^{m} 14.93^{s}	−58° 28′ 34.6″	5.63	0.82	298	G8III	
HD 219482	ο (Note: Labelled Omicron Tucanae (ο Tuc/ο Tucanae) by Bode in his Urnaographia)		219482	114948	23^{h} 16^{m} 57.47^{s}	−62° 00′ 04.1″	5.64	4.07	67	F7V	
HD 221006		CG	221006	115908	23^{h} 29^{m} 00.93^{s}	−63° 06′ 38.2″	5.66	0.33	380	Ap Si	α² CVn variable, ΔV = 0.045^{m}, P = 2.3148 d
BQ Tuc		BQ	5276	4200	00^{h} 53^{m} 37.78^{s}	−62° 52′ 16.9″	5.70	−0.64	613	M4III	semiregular variable, ΔV = 0.2^{m}
HD 222820			222820	117088	23^{h} 44^{m} 12.03^{s}	−64° 24′ 16.3″	5.73	−1.42	879	K3II	
HD 3823			3823	3170	00^{h} 40^{m} 24.66^{s}	−59° 27′ 20.5″	5.89	3.86	83	G1V	
HD 224361	υ (Note: Labelled Upsilon Tucanae (υ Tuc/υ Tucanae) by Bode in his Uranographia)		224361	118092	23^{h} 57^{m} 19.78^{s}	−62° 57′ 23.8″	5.95	1.96	205	A2p	
HD 214632	τ (Note: Labelled Tau Tucanae (τ Tuc/τ Tucanae) by Bode in his Uranographia)		214632	111967	22^{h} 40^{m} 48.86^{s}	−57° 25′ 20.3″	5.98	−1.90	1226	K4III	
HD 4088			4088	3352	00^{h} 42^{m} 41.64^{s}	−60° 15′ 45.7″	5.99	1.68	237	K5III	
HD 4294			4294	3489	00^{h} 44^{m} 31.52^{s}	−62° 29′ 51.4″	6.06	1.44	274	F5III/IV	
HD 222805			222805	117105	23^{h} 44^{m} 25.00^{s}	−70° 29′ 25.4″	6.06	2.75	150	G8IV	
DR Tuc		DR	220263	115433	23^{h} 22^{m} 56.68^{s}	−60° 03′ 21.0″	6.08	−1.00	851	M3III	semiregular variable
θ Tuc	θ		3112	2629	00^{h} 33^{m} 23.23^{s}	−71° 15′ 58.4″	6.11	0.22	490	A7IV	δ Sct variable, V_{max} = 6.06^{m}, V_{min} = 6.15^{m}, P = 0.049308 d
HD 219077			219077	114699	23^{h} 14^{m} 05.98^{s}	−62° 41′ 56.3″	6.12	3.79	95	G5IV	has a planet (b)
HD 216187			216187	112924	22^{h} 52^{m} 09.98^{s}	−63° 11′ 18.8″	6.14	0.69	401	K0III	
HD 213884			213884	111548	22^{h} 35^{m} 52.84^{s}	−57° 53′ 01.4″	6.22	2.07	220	F0Vn	
λ^{1} Tuc	λ^{1}		5190	4084	00^{h} 52^{m} 24.51^{s}	−69° 30′ 12.9″	6.22		206	F7IV/V	suspected variable
HD 5771	φ (Note: Labelled Phi Tucanae (φ Tuc/φ Tucanae) by Bode in his Uranographia)		5771	4563	00^{h} 58^{m} 22.18^{s}	−60° 41′ 46.7″	6.23	0.07	557	Am	
HD 7916			7916	5992	01^{h} 17^{m} 03.68^{s}	−66° 23′ 52.4″	6.23	1.16	336	A0V	
CC Tuc	χ (Note: Labelled Chi Tucanae (χ Tuc/χ Tucanae) by Bode in his Uranographia)	CC	6311	4879	01^{h} 02^{m} 42.89^{s}	−65° 27′ 22.0″	6.25	−0.71	803	M2III	semiregular variable, V_{max} = 6.22^{m}, V_{min} = 6.37^{m}
HD 215121			215121	112259	22^{h} 44^{m} 16.48^{s}	−60° 29′ 58.8″	6.29	0.63	442	F3V	
HD 565			565	798	00^{h} 09^{m} 52.10^{s}	−62° 17′ 48.6″	6.34	0.68	442	A6V	
HD 215682			215682	112603	22^{h} 48^{m} 21.30^{s}	−61° 41′ 03.7″	6.36	0.95	393	K0III	
HD 211726	μ (Note: In Bode’s Uranographia) (Note: This designation was dropped by Francis Baily)		211726	110311	22^{h} 20^{m} 36.25^{s}	−57° 30′ 35.1″	6.41	−0.48	780	K3/K4III	
HD 3444			3444	2889	00^{h} 36^{m} 37.59^{s}	−65° 07′ 27.9″	6.43	−0.05	646	K2/K3III	
HD 216169			216169	112895	22^{h} 51^{m} 45.00^{s}	−59° 52′ 52.9″	6.47	1.27	357	K1IIICN...	
HD 220759			220759	115756	23^{h} 27^{m} 07.47^{s}	−66° 34′ 51.1″	6.47	−0.70	886	K4III	
HD 215562	ξ		215562	112533	22^{h} 47^{m} 35.71^{s}	−65° 33′ 36.8″	6.49	0.05	633	K1III	
HD 4308			4308	3497	00^{h} 44^{m} 39.27^{s}	−65° 38′ 58.3″	6.54	4.84	72	G5V	has a planet (b)
Gliese 902			222237	116745	23^{h} 39^{m} 36.83^{s}	−72° 43′ 19.8″	7.09	7.29	37.1	K3V	
HD 7442	(δ) (Note: Designated as Delta Nubeculae Minoris by Bode in his Uranographia)		7442	5613	01^{h} 12^{m} 00.06^{s}	39° 09′ 42.28″	7.19		202		
HD 6870		BS	6870	5321	01^{h} 08^{m} 03.97^{s}	−61° 52′ 17.8″	7.45		339	A2IIwp	δ Sct variable, V_{max} = 7.43^{m}, V_{min} = 7.57^{m}, P = 0.065 d
HD 222076			222076	116630	23^{h} 38^{m} 08.0^{s}	−70° 54′ 12″	7.48		272		has a planet (b)
HD 217488	σ (Note: Labelled Sigma Tucanae (σ Tuc/σ Tucanae) by Bode in his Uranographia)		217488	113759	23^{h} 02^{m} 15.99^{s}	–64° 17′ 52.3″	7.65		348	F3:IV/V+	
HD 221287			221287	116084	23^{h} 31^{m} 20.34^{s}	−58° 12′ 35.0″	7.82	4.20	173	F7V	Poerava, has a planet (b)
CF Tuc		CF	5303	4157	00^{h} 53^{m} 07.77^{s}	−74° 39′ 05.6″	7.90		291.3	G5IV+K4IV-V	RS CVn variable, V_{max} = 7.50^{m}, V_{min} = 7.86^{m}, P = 2.79750 d
HD 1397			1397	1419	00^{h} 17^{m} 47.0^{s}	−66° 21′ 32″	7.90		259	G5III	has a planet (b)
HD 213885			213885	111553	22^{h} 35^{m} 56.0^{s}	−59° 51′ 53″	8.0		189	G	has two planets (b and c)
HD 7199			7199	5529	01^{h} 10^{m} 47^{s}	−66° 11′ 17″	8.06		117	KOIV/V	Emiw, has a planet (b)
HD 224538			224538	118228	23^{h} 58^{m} 52.0^{s}	−61° 35′ 12″	8.06		254	F9IV/V	has a planet (b)
HD 215497			215497	112441	22^{h} 46^{m} 36.75^{s}	−56° 35′ 58.3″	8.97	5.78	142	K3V	has two planets (b & c)
HD 222259 A		DS	222259	116748	23^{h} 39^{m} 40.0^{s}	−69° 11′ 45″	9		143	G6V	has a planet (b)
AQ Tuc		AQ	1372	1387	00^{h} 17^{m} 21.51^{s}	−71° 54′ 56.8″	10.12		1490	F4+...	W UMa variable, V_{max} = 9.91^{m}, V_{min} = 10.48^{m}, P = 0.59484267 d
HD 7583			7583	5714	01^{h} 13^{m} 30.50^{s}	−73° 20′ 10.3″	10.20		200000	A0Iao	in SMC; yellow hypergiant, V_{max} = 10.13^{m}, V_{min} = 10.44^{m}
R40			6884	5267	01^{h} 07^{m} 18.22^{s}	−72° 28′ 03.7″	10.23		200000	B9Iae	in SMC; luminous blue variable, V_{max} = 9.5^{m}, V_{min} = 10.73^{m}
HD 5980			5980		00^{h} 59^{m} 26.57^{s}	−72° 09′ 53.9″	11.31		200000	WN3+OB D	in SMC; triple star; contains a luminous blue variable and a Wolf–Rayet star, V_{max} = 8.8^{m}, V_{min} = 11.9^{m}; both components among the most luminous stars known
W Tuc		W		4541	00^{h} 58^{m} 09.70^{s}	−63° 23′ 44.4″	11.60		979	A...	RR Lyr variable, V_{max} = 10.783^{m}, V_{min} = 11.950^{m}, P = 0.6422382 d
BZ Tuc		BZ			00^{h} 41^{m} 43.43^{s}	−73° 43′ 23.6″	11.68		200000	F8Ib	in SMC; classical Cepheid, V_{max} = 11.65^{m}, V_{min} = 12.35^{m}, P = 127.447 d
WASP-91					23^{h} 51^{m} 23.0^{s}	−70° 09′ 10″	12.00			K3	has a planet (b)
WASP-164					22^{h} 59^{m} 29.6^{s}	−60° 26′ 52″	12.62			G2V	has a transiting planet (b)
AB7					01^{h} 03^{m} 35.93^{s}	−72° 03′ 22.0″	13.02		200000	WN4+O6I	in SMC; binary star; contains a Wolf–Rayet star
SMC X-1					01^{h} 17^{m} 05.15^{s}	−73° 26′ 36.0″	13.30		200000	OB:	in SMC; high-mass X-ray binary
SMC X-3					00^{h} 52^{m} 05.64^{s}	−72° 26′ 04.2″	14.91		200000	B1-B1.5IV-V	in SMC; X-ray pulsar
AX J0051-733		DZ			00^{h} 50^{m} 44.70^{s}	−73° 16′ 05.4″	15.44		200000	B0-B0.5V	in SMC; X-ray pulsar with Be star companion, V_{max} = 14.7^{m}, V_{min} = 15.7^{m}, P = 0.708 d
SMC X-2					00^{h} 54^{m} 36.2^{s}	−73° 40′ 35″	16.38		200000	B1.5Ve	in SMC; high-mass X-ray binary
CP Tuc		CP			23^{h} 15^{m} 19.10^{s}	−59° 10′ 28.3″					AM Her variable
PSR J0045-7319					00^{h} 45^{m} 35.16^{s}	−73° 19′ 03.0″			200000		in SMC; pulsar
PMMR 62					00^{h} 53^{m} 47.93^{s}	−72° 02′ 09.487″	12.43		11365.53	M0Iab C	Red supergiant located in the Small Magellanic Cloud.
Table legend: • Name = Proper name • B = Bayer designation • F or/and G. = Flamsteed designation or Gould designation • Var = Variable-star designation • HD = Henry Draper Catalogue designation number • HIP = Hipparcos Catalogue designation number • RA = Right ascension for the Epoch/Equinox J2000.0 • Dec = Declination for the Epoch/Equinox J2000.0 • vis. mag. = visual magnitude (m or m_{v}), also known as apparent magnitude • abs. mag. = absolute magnitude (M_{v}) • Dist. (ly) = Distance in light-years from Earth • Sp. class = Spectral class of the star in the stellar classification system • Notes = Common name(s) or alternate name(s); comments; notable properties [for example: multiple star status, range of variability if it is a variable star, exoplanets, etc.]

== See also ==
- List of stars by constellation
