= Kepler-90f =

Exoplanet in the constellation Draco

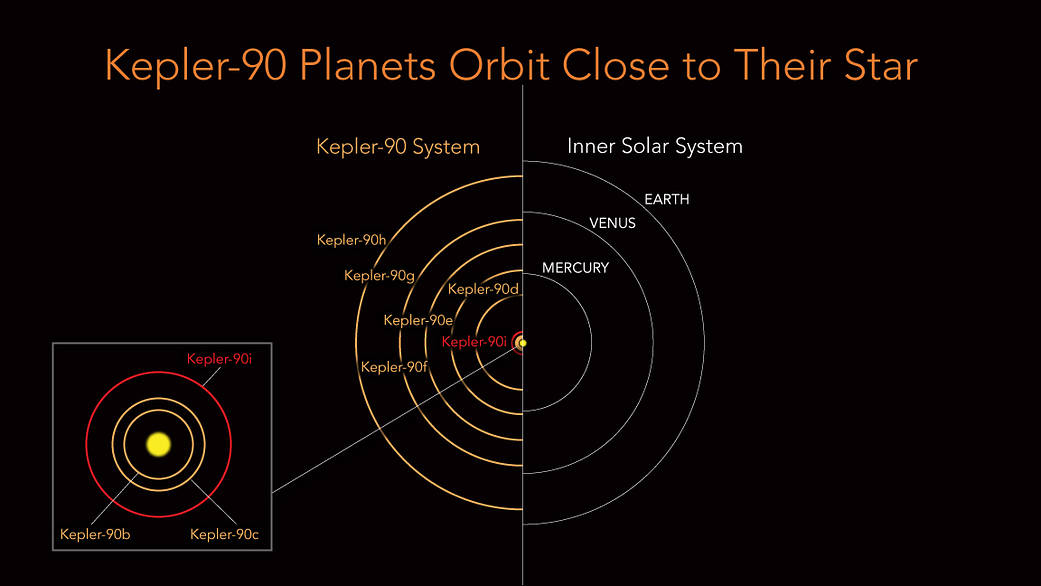
- Illustration of the Kepler-90 system compared to the inner solar system. Kepler-90f orbits between Kepler-90e and Kepler-90g.

Discovery
- Discovered by: J. Cabrera et al.
- Discovery site: Kepler space telescope
- Discovery date: 23 October 2013
- Detection method: Transit method

Orbital characteristics
- Semi-major axis: 0.48 ± 0.09 AU (72,000,000 ± 13,000,000 km)
- Eccentricity: 0
- Orbital period (sidereal): 124.9144 ± 0.0019 d
- Inclination: 89.77 ± 0.31
- Star: Kepler-90

Physical characteristics
- Mean radius: 2.88 ± 0.52 R_{🜨}
- Temperature: 407 K (134 °C)

Kepler-90f is an exoplanet orbiting the star Kepler-90, located in the constellation Draco. It was discovered by the Kepler telescope in October 2013. It orbits its parent star at only 0.48 astronomical units away, and at its distance it completes an orbit once every 124.91 days.

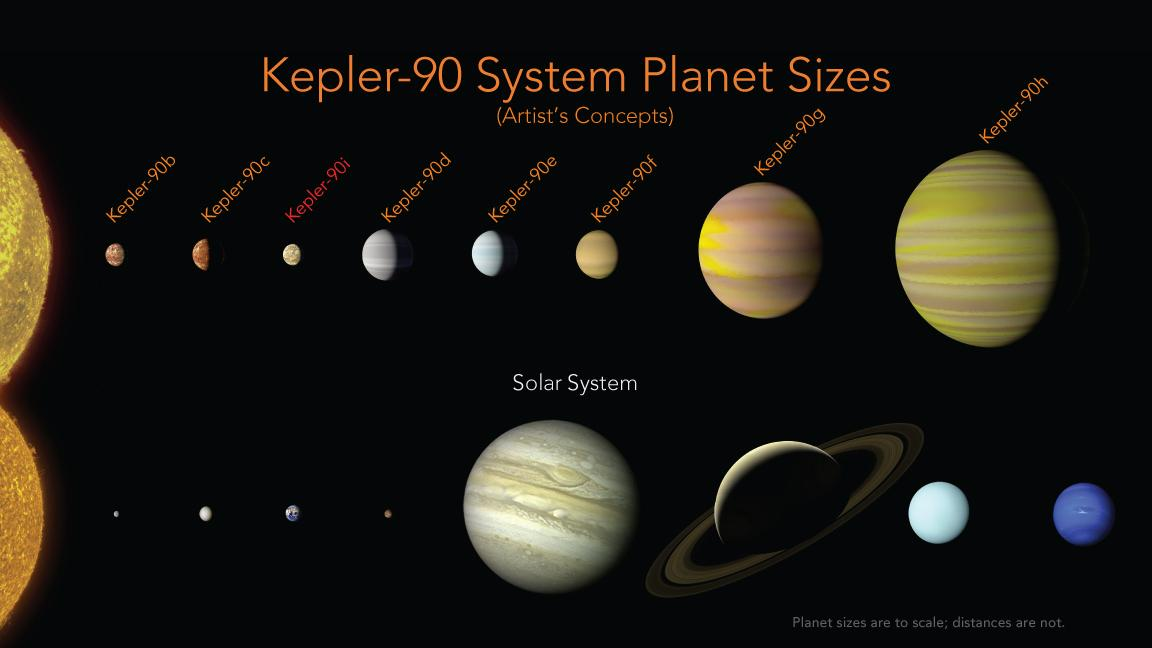
Artist's impression of the planets of the Kepler-90 exoplanetary system compared to the eight planets of the Solar System.

== Host star ==
The planet orbits a G-type star named Kepler-90, its host star. The star is 1.2 times as massive as the Sun and is 1.2 times as large as the Sun. It is estimated to be 2 billion years old, with a surface temperature of 6080 K. In comparison, the Sun is about 4.6 billion years old and has a surface temperature of 5778 K.
