= Lambda Tucanae =

The Bayer designation Lambda Tucanae (λ Tuc, λ Tucanae) is shared by two star systems in the constellation Tucana.

- λ^{1} Tucanae
- λ^{2} Tucanae

They are separated by 0.23° in the sky.
