= NGC 152 =

Open cluster in the constellation Tucana

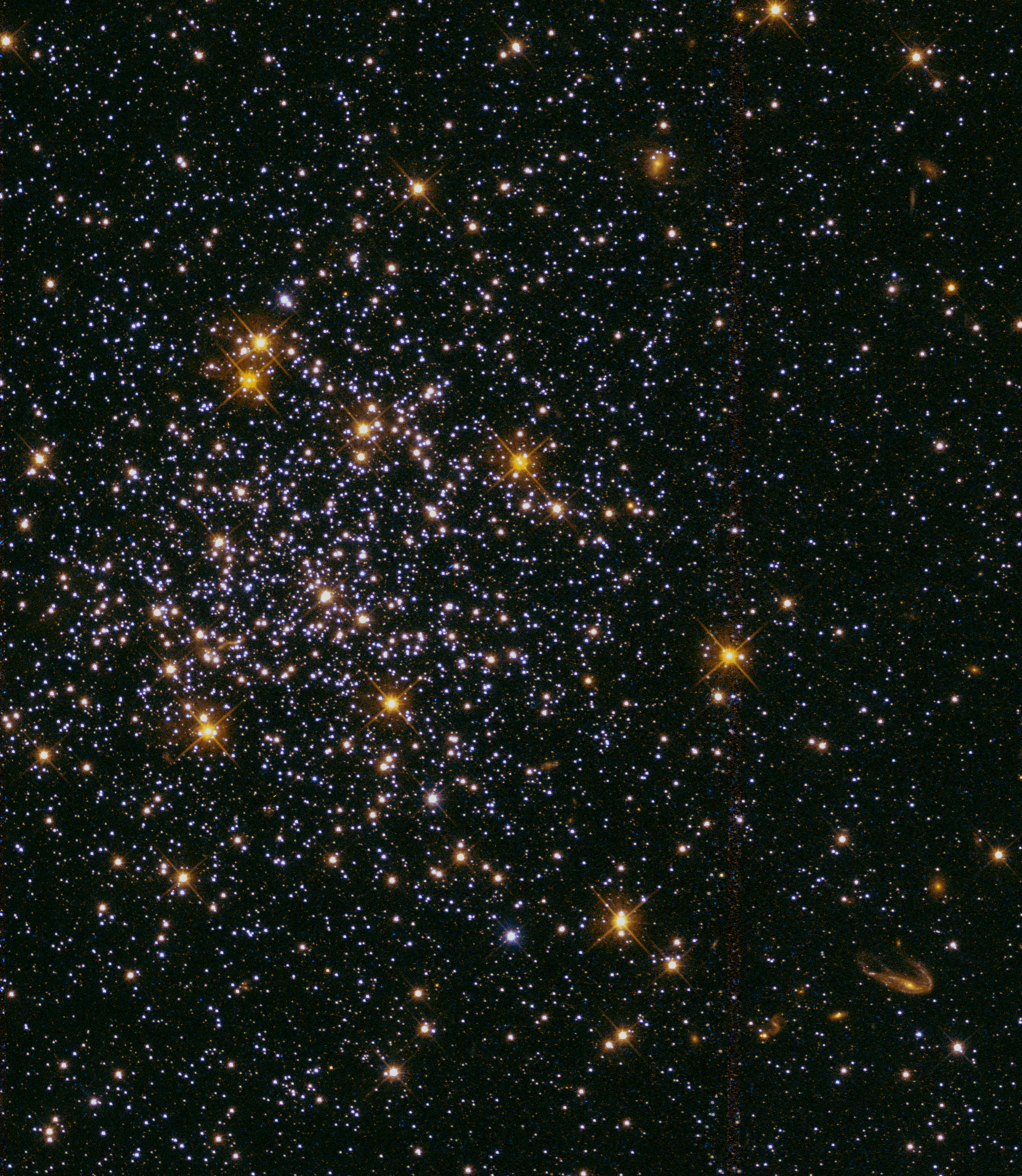
- NGC 152 as seen from the Hubble Space Telescope

Observation data (J2000 epoch)
- Right ascension: 00^{h} 32^{m} 56.26^{s}
- Declination: −73° 06′ 56.6″
- Apparent magnitude (V): 12.26
- Apparent dimensions (V): 3.00′ × 3.00′

Physical characteristics
- Mass: 2.5×10^{4} M_{☉}
- Estimated age: 1.40±0.20 Gyr
- Other designations: ESO 28-24

Associations
- Constellation: Tucana

NGC 152 is an open cluster in the constellation Tucana. It was discovered by John Herschel on September 20, 1835. It is located within the Small Magellanic Cloud.

NGC 152 is about 1.40 billion years old. Its estimated mass is 2.5×10^{4} M_{☉}, and its total luminosity is 8.0×10^{4} L_{☉}, leading to a mass-to-luminosity ratio of 0.31 M_{☉}/L_{☉}. All else equal, older star clusters have a lower luminosity for the same mass; that is, their mass-to-luminosity ratios are higher.

== See also ==
- List of NGC objects (1–1000)
- List of stars in Tucana
