= HAT-P-38 =

Star in the constellation Traingulum

HAT-P-38/Horna
Observation data Epoch J2000.0 (ICRS) Equinox ICRS
- Constellation: Triangulum
- Right ascension: 02^{h} 21^{m} 31.98035^{s}
- Declination: +32° 14′ 46.0933″
- Apparent magnitude (V): 12.51±0.02

Characteristics
- Evolutionary stage: main sequence
- Spectral type: G5
- B−V color index: +0.83

Astrometry
Radial velocity (R_{v})	−19.85±0.73 km/s
Proper motion (μ)	RA: +47.671 mas/yr Dec.: −21.594 mas/yr
Parallax (π)	3.9747±0.0134 mas
Distance	821 ± 3 ly (251.6 ± 0.8 pc)

Details
Mass	0.886±0.044 M_{☉}
Radius	1.01^{+0.07}_{−0.05} R_{☉}
Luminosity	0.6772^{+0.007}_{−0.008} L_{☉}
Surface gravity (log g)	4.46±0.08 cgs
Temperature	5,330±100 K
Metallicity [Fe/H]	+0.06±0.10 dex
Rotational velocity (v sin i)	0.4±0.5 km/s
Age	10.1^{+3.9}_{−4.8} Gyr

Other designations
- Horna, TOI-3681, TIC 285272237, GSC 02314-00559

Database references
SIMBAD	data
Exoplanet Archive	data

HAT-P-38, formally named Horna, is a star located in the northern constellation Triangulum. It has an apparent magnitude of 12.51, making it readily visible in amateur telescopes but not to the naked eye. The object is located relatively far at a distance of 821 light-years based on Gaia DR3 parallax measurements, but it is drifting closer with a spectroscopic radial velocity of −19.85 km/s.

HAT-P-38 has a stellar classification of G5, indicating that it is a G-type star. It has 88.6% the mass of the Sun and 101% the radius of the Sun. It radiates 67.72% the luminosity of the Sun from its photosphere at an effective temperature of 5,330 K, giving it a yelllowish-orange hue. HAT-P-38 is slightly metal enriched with an iron abundance 115% that of the Sun's. It is estimated to be approximately 10.1 billion years old, which is more than twice the age of the Sun. It spins modestly with a projected rotational velocity of 0.4 km/s.

== Planetary system ==
In 2012, a hot Saturn was detected on a tight 4-day orbit via the transit method; the planet has a similar mass and radius to Saturn. A 2017 paper comparing HAT-P-38b and WASP-67b found that there was water vapor in the planet's atmosphere. HAT-P-38b had a higher water vapor abundance compared to the latter, indicating that the planet is free of clouds or hazes in its upper atmosphere.

In 2019, the system was selected for the second NameExoWorlds campaign for Finland as part of the IAU's 100th anniversary. The approved name for the star is Horna, which is hell or the underworld from Finnic mythology.

The HAT-P-38 planetary system
Companion (in order from star)	Mass	Semimajor axis (AU)	Orbital period (days)	Eccentricity	Inclination (°)	Radius
b (Hiisi)	0.267±0.020 M_{J}	0.05231^{+0.00085}_{−0.00089}	4.6403288±0.0000011	<0.055	88.3±0.7	0.825^{+0.092}_{−0.063} R_{J}
