= Kepler-80 =

Star in the constellation Cygnus

Observation data Epoch J2000 Equinox ICRS
- Constellation: Cygnus
- Right ascension: 19^{h} 44^{m} 27.0201^{s}
- Declination: +39° 58′ 43.594″
- Apparent magnitude (V): 14.804

Characteristics
- Evolutionary stage: Main sequence
- Spectral type: M0V
- Variable type: Planetary transit

Astrometry
Proper motion (μ)	RA: −1.373(20) mas/yr Dec.: −7.207(24) mas/yr
Parallax (π)	2.6675±0.0183 mas
Distance	1,223 ± 8 ly (375 ± 3 pc)

Details
Mass	0.730±0.030 M_{☉}
Radius	0.678±0.023 R_{☉}
Luminosity	0.170+0.033 −0.022 L_{☉}
Temperature	4540±100 K
Metallicity [Fe/H]	0.04±0.08 dex
Rotation	25.567±0.252 days
Age	2±1 Gyr

Other designations
- KOI-500, KIC 4852528, 2MASS J19442701+3958436

Database references
SIMBAD	data
Exoplanet Archive	data
KIC	data

Kepler-80, also known as KOI-500, is a red dwarf star of the spectral type M0V. This stellar classification places Kepler-80 among the very common, cool, class M stars that are still within their main evolutionary stage, known as the main sequence. Kepler-80, like other red dwarf stars, is smaller than the Sun, and it has a radius, mass, temperatures, and luminosity lower than that of a star. Kepler-80 is found approximately 1,223 light years from the Solar System, in the stellar constellation Cygnus, also known as the Swan.

The Kepler-80 system has six known exoplanets. The discovery of the five inner planets was announced in October 2012, marking Kepler-80 as the first star identified with five orbiting planets. In 2017, an additional planet, Kepler-80g, was discovered by use of artificial intelligence and deep learning to analyse data from the Kepler space telescope. The method used to discover Kepler-80g had been developed by Google, and during the same study another planet was found, Kepler-90i, which brought the total number of known planets in Kepler-90 up to eight planets.

== Planetary system ==
The exoplanets around Kepler-80 were discovered and observed using the Kepler Space Telescope. This telescope uses the so called transit method, where the planets move in between the star and the Earth and thereby dim the light of the star as seen from the Earth. By using photometry the transit of a planet in front of its star can be seen as a dip in the light curve of the star. After the initial discovery the five innermost planets have all been confirmed through additional investigations. Kepler-80b and Kepler-80c were both confirmed in 2013 based on their transit-timing variation (TTV). Kepler-80d and Kepler-80e were validated in 2014 based on statistical analysis of the Kepler data. Finally the innermost planet, Kepler-80f was confirmed in 2016.

All six known planets in the Kepler-80 system have semi-major axes <0.2 AU. For comparison the planet in the Solar System closest to the star, Mercury, has a semi major axis of 0.389 AU, and so the entire known system of Kepler-80 can lie within the orbit of Mercury. This makes Kepler-80 a very compact system and it is one of many STIP's (Systems with Tightly-packed Inner Planets) that have been discovered by the Kepler telescope.

In 2014, the dynamical simulation shown what the Kepler-80 planetary system have likely to undergone a substantial inward migration in the past, producing an observed pattern of lower-mass planets on tightest orbits.

The Kepler-80 planetary system
Companion (in order from star)	Mass	Semimajor axis (AU)	Orbital period (days)	Eccentricity	Inclination (°)	Radius
f	—	0.0175 ± 0.0002	0.98678730 ± 0.00000006	~0	86.50 ^{+2.36}_{−2.59}	1.031^{+0.033}_{−0.027} R_{🜨}
d	4.1 ± 0.4 M_{🜨}	0.0372 ± 0.0005	3.07221 ± 0.00003	0.005^{+0.004}_{−0.003}	88.35 ^{+1.12}_{−1.51}	1.309^{+0.036}_{−0.032} R_{🜨}
e	2.2 ± 0.4 M_{🜨}	0.0491 ± 0.0007	4.6453 ^{+0.00010}_{−0.00009}	0.008 ± 0.004	88.79 ^{+0.84}_{−1.07}	1.330^{+0.039}_{−0.038} R_{🜨}
b	2.4 ± 0.6 M_{🜨}	0.0658 ± 0.0009	7.05325 ± 0.00009	0.006 ^{+0.005}_{−0.004}	89.34 ^{+0.46}_{−0.62}	2.367^{+0.055}_{−0.052} R_{🜨}
c	3.4^{+0.9}_{−0.7} M_{🜨}	0.0792 ± 0.0011	9.5232 ± 0.0002	0.010 ^{+0.006}_{−0.005}	89.33 ^{+0.47}_{−0.57}	2.507^{+0.061}_{−0.058} R_{🜨}
g	1.0 ± 0.3 M_{🜨}	0.142 ^{+0.037}_{−0.051}	14.6471 ^{+0.0007}_{−0.0012}	0.02 ^{+0.03}_{−0.02}	89.35 ^{+0.47}_{−0.98}	1.05^{+0.22}_{−0.24} R_{🜨}

== Orbital resonance ==
The system Kepler-80 has orbits locked in a trio of three-body mean-motion orbital resonances; between Kepler-80 d, e, and b; between Kepler-80 e, b, and c; and between Kepler-80 b, c, and g. Interestingly, no two-body resonances have been found to exist in this system.

While Kepler-80 d, e, b, c and g's periods are in a ~ 1.000: 1.512: 2.296: 3.100: 4.767 ratio, in a frame of reference that rotates with the conjunctions this reduces to a ratio of 4:6:9:12:18. Conjunctions of d and e, e and b, b and c, and c and g occur at relative intervals of 2:3:6:6 in a pattern that repeats about every 191 days. Modeling indicates the resonant system is stable to perturbations. Triple conjunctions do not occur.
