= Kepler-90 =

Star in the constellation Draco, orbited by eight planets

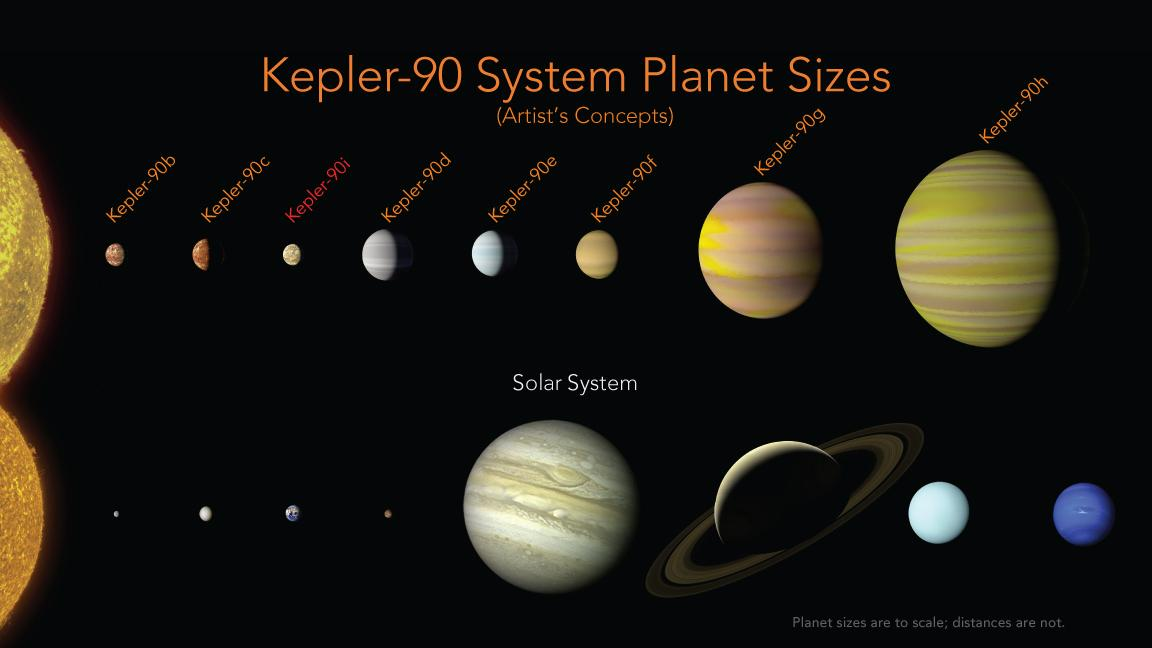
- Artist's impression of the planets of the Kepler-90 exoplanetary system compared to the eight planets of the Solar System

Observation data Epoch J2000 Equinox ICRS
- Constellation: Draco
- Right ascension: 18^{h} 57^{m} 44.03831^{s}
- Declination: +49° 18′ 18.4965″
- Apparent magnitude (V): 13.9

Characteristics
- Evolutionary stage: Main sequence
- Spectral type: F9IV/V

Astrometry
| Radial velocity (R_{v}) | −15.54±2.91 km/s |
| Proper motion (μ) | RA: −4.350(12) mas/yr Dec.: −3.256(14) mas/yr |
| Parallax (π) | 1.1695±0.0112 mas |
| Distance | 2,790 ± 30 ly (855 ± 8 pc) |

Details
| Mass | 1.2±0.1 M_{☉} |
| Radius | 1.2±0.1 R_{☉} |
| Luminosity | 1.7 L_{☉} |
| Surface gravity (log g) | 4.4 cgs |
| Temperature | 6,080+260 −170 K |
| Metallicity [Fe/H] | −0.12±0.18 dex |
| Rotation | 13.64 |
| Rotational velocity (v sin i) | 4.6±2.1 km/s |
| Age | 5.8 Gyr |

Other designations
- 2MASS J18574403+4918185, KIC 11442793, KOI-351, Gaia DR2 2132193431285570304

Database references
| SIMBAD | data |
| Exoplanet Archive | data |
| KIC | data |

Kepler-90, also designated 2MASS J18574403+4918185, is an F-type star located about 2,790 light-years (855 pc) from Earth in the constellation of Draco. It is notable for being the only confirmed planetary system with the same number of observed planets as the Solar System.

== Nomenclature and history ==
Prior to Kepler observation, Kepler-90 had the 2MASS catalogue number 2MASS J18574403+4918185. It has the designation of KIC 11442793 in the Kepler Input Catalog, and was given the Kepler object of interest number of KOI-351 when it was found to have a transiting planet candidate.

The star's planetary system was discovered by NASA's Kepler Mission, a mission tasked with discovering planets in transit around their stars. The transit method that Kepler uses involves detecting dips in brightness in stars. These dips in brightness can be interpreted as planets whose orbits move in front of their stars from the perspective of Earth. The name Kepler-90 derives directly from the fact that the star is the catalogued 90th star discovered by Kepler to have confirmed planets.

The whole star and planet system is designated by just "Kepler-90", without a postfix, with Kepler-90A specifically referring only to the star, if needed for clarity. The first planet discovered is Kepler-90b, with subsequently discovered planets given subsequent lowercase letters in order of discovery, up to Kepler-90i, for the last planet found to date. (Note: Designations with postfix letters b, c, d, e, f, g, h, and i follow the order of discovery; postfix letter A (Kepler-90A) is used for the host star (or often no suffix at all, Kepler-90, which also refers to the entire system of star and planets as a whole). The letter b specifies the first planet discovered orbiting a given star, followed by the other lowercase letters of the alphabet. In the case of the Kepler-90 star system, there have been eight planets discovered orbiting the star Kepler-90A, so far, so letters up to i are used to distinguish them, with Kepler-90i being the last planet discovered thus far.)

== Stellar characteristics ==
Kepler-90 is an F-type star that is approximately 120% the mass and radius of the Sun. It has a surface temperature of around 6,100 K. In comparison, the Sun has a surface temperature of 5,772 K.

The star's apparent magnitude, or how bright it appears from Earth's perspective, is 14. It is too dim to be seen with the naked eye, which typically can only see objects with a magnitude around 6.

== Planetary system ==
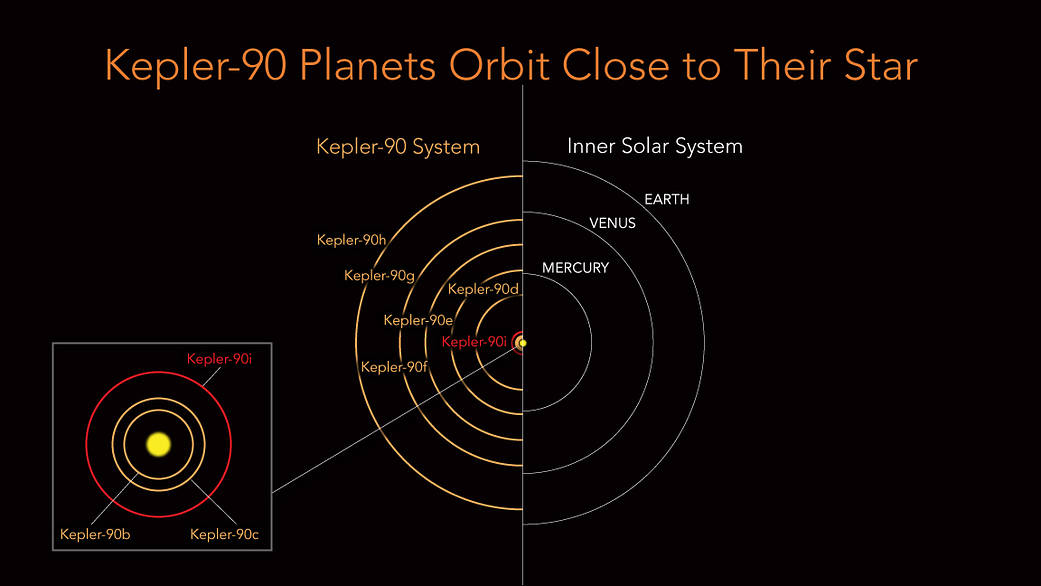
Comparison of the Kepler-90 exoplanetary system with that of the Solar System

Kepler-90 is notable for sharing similarities with the Solar System, in which rocky planets are nearer the star and gas giants farther away. The six inner planets range from super-Earths to mini-Neptunes in size. The two outermost planets are gas giants. The most distant known planet orbits its host star at about the same distance as Earth from the Sun.

Kepler-90 was used to test the "validation by multiplicity" confirmation method for Kepler planets. Six inner planets met all the requirements for confirmation. The penultimate planet showed transit-timing variations, indicating that it is a real planet as well.

On 14 December 2017, NASA and Google announced the discovery of an eighth exoplanet, Kepler-90i, in the Kepler-90 system. The discovery was made using a new machine learning method developed by Google.

The Kepler-90 system is the only eight-planet system from Kepler, (Note: Kepler-385 (KOI-2433) also has eight planet candidates, but one of them is known to be a false positive, so it is not a potential eight-planet system.) and the second to be discovered after the Solar System. It was also the only seven-planet candidate system from Kepler, before the eighth was discovered in 2017. All of the eight known planet candidates orbit within about 1 AU of Kepler-90. A Hill stability test and an orbital integration of the system show that it is stable.

The five innermost exoplanets, Kepler-90b, c, i, d, and e are likely tidally locked, meaning that one side of the exoplanets permanently faces the star in eternal daylight and the other side permanently faces away in eternal darkness.

A 2020 analysis of transit-timing variations of the two outermost planets, Kepler-90g and h, found best-fit masses of 15+0.9
−0.8 M_{🜨} and 203±5 M_{🜨}, respectively. Given a transit-derived radius of 8.13 R_{🜨}, Kepler-90g was found to have an extremely low density of 0.15±0.05 g/cm^{3}, unusually inflated for its mass and insolation. Several proposed explanations for its apparently low density include a puffy planet with a dusty atmosphere or a smaller planet surrounded by a tilted wide ring system (albeit the latter option is less likely due to the lack of evidence for rings in transit data). A 2024 study updated the mass of Kepler-90g and h to 15.0±1.3 M_{🜨} and 203±16 M_{🜨} respectively with the inner planets' masses being estimated using the measured radius and an empirical mass–radius relation.

The Kepler-90 planetary system
| Companion (in order from star) | Mass | Semimajor axis (AU) | Orbital period (days) | Eccentricity | Inclination (°) | Radius |
|---|---|---|---|---|---|---|
| b | 4.3 (Note: Estimated using the measured radius and an empirical mass–radius relation) M_{🜨} | 0.074±0.016 | 7.008151 | — | 89.4 | 1.30±0.07 R_{🜨} |
| c | 6.5 M_{🜨} | 0.089±0.012 | 8.719375 | — | 89.68 | 1.45±0.07 R_{🜨} |
| i | 4.5 M_{🜨} | 0.107±0.03 | 14.44912 | — | 89.2 | 1.32±0.21 R_{🜨} |
| d | 7.2 M_{🜨} | 0.32±0.05 | 59.73667 | — | 89.71 | 2.87±0.09 R_{🜨} |
| e | 6.6 M_{🜨} | 0.42±0.06 | 91.93913 | — | 89.79 | 2.61±0.09 R_{🜨} |
| f | 6.9 M_{🜨} | 0.48±0.09 | 124.9144 | 0.01 | 89.77 | 2.77±0.12 R_{🜨} |
| g | 15.0±1.3 M_{🜨} | 0.71±0.08 | 210.73514(17) | 0.0292±0.0018 | 89.92^{+0.03}_{−0.01} | 7.72±0.21 R_{🜨} |
| h | 203±16 M_{🜨} | 1.01±0.11 | 331.60296(34) | 0.0276±0.0031 | 89.927^{+0.011}_{−0.007} | 11.25±0.306 R_{🜨} |

=== Near resonances ===
Kepler-90's eight known planets all have periods that are close to being in integer ratio relationships with other planets' periods; that is, they are close to being in orbital resonance. The period ratios b:c, c:i and i:d are close to 4:5, 3:5, and 1:4, respectively (4: 4.977, 3: 4.97, and 1: 4.13) and d, e, f, g, and h are close to a 2:3:4:7:11 period ratio (2: 3.078: 4.182: 7.051: 11.102; also 7: 11.021). f, g, and h are also close to a 3:5:8 period ratio (3: 5.058: 7.964).

Relevant to systems like this and that of Kepler-36, calculations suggest that the presence of an outer gas giant planet (as exemplified by g and h in this system) facilitates the formation of closely packed resonances among inner super-Earths. The semimajor axis of any additional non-transiting outer gas giant must be larger than 30 AU to keep from perturbing the observed planetary system out of the transiting plane.

== See also ==
- TRAPPIST-1, star with seven known exoplanets
- HD 10180, star with at least six known exoplanets, and three exoplanet candidates
- Kepler-385, star with at least three known exoplanets, and four more candidates
- HD 219134, star with six exoplanets
- 55 Cancri, star with multiple planets
- Tau Ceti, star with at least four exoplanets and four more candidates
