= Kepler-90i =

Super-Earth orbiting Kepler-90

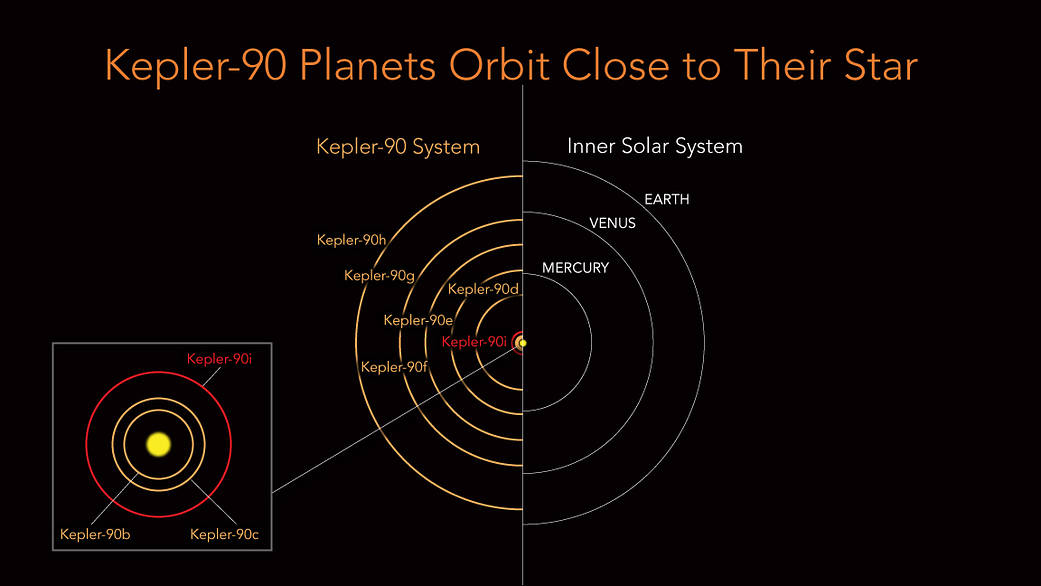
- Illustration of the Kepler-90 system compared to the inner solar system. Kepler-90h is the outermost planet of the Kepler-90 system.

Discovery
- Discovered by: Kepler spacecraft
- Discovery date: 2017 Shallue et al.
- Detection method: Transit and deep learning, a class of machine learning algorithms.

Orbital characteristics
- Semi-major axis: 0.107^{+0.025}_{−0.040} AU
- Orbital period (sidereal): 14.44912±0.00020 d
- Inclination: 89.20 ^{+0.59}_{−1.30}
- Star: Kepler-90

Physical characteristics
- Mean radius: 1.32±0.21 R_{🜨}
- Temperature: 709 K (436 °C; 817 °F)

Kepler-90i (also known by its Kepler Object of Interest designation KOI-351.08) is a super-Earth exoplanet with a radius 1.32 times that of Earth, orbiting the early G-type main sequence star Kepler-90 every 14.45 days, discovered by NASA's Kepler spacecraft. It is located about 2,840 light-years (870 parsecs, or nearly 2.4078×10^{16} km) from Earth in the constellation Draco. The exoplanet is the eighth in the star's multiplanetary system. As of December 2017, Kepler-90 is the star hosting the most exoplanets found. Kepler-90i was found with the transit method, in which the dimming effect that a planet causes as it crosses in front of its star is measured, and by a newly utilized computer tool, deep learning, a class of machine learning algorithms.

== Characteristics ==
=== Mass, radius and temperature ===
Kepler-90i is a super-Earth exoplanet with a radius of 1.32 R_{🜨}, indicating that it is small enough to be rocky. With an Earth-like composition, Kepler-90i would have a mass of about 2.3 M_{🜨}, since its volume is $1.32^3 \approx 2.3$ times that of Earth's. It has an equilibrium temperature of 709 K (436 °C; 817 °F), similar to the average temperature of Venus.

=== Host star ===
The planet orbits Kepler-90, a G-type main sequence star. The star has a mass of 1.2 M_{☉} and a radius 1.2 R_{☉}. It has a surface temperatures of 6080 K and has an estimated age of around 2 billion years, with considerable uncertainty. In comparison, the Sun is about 4.6 billion years old and has a surface temperature of 5778 K.

The star's apparent magnitude, or how bright it appears from Earth's perspective, is 14. It is too dim to be seen with the naked eye.

=== Orbital characteristics ===
Kepler-90i orbits its host star about every 14.45 days with a semi-major axis of 0.107 AU.

Due to its very close distance to its host star, it is likely to be tidally locked, meaning that one side permanently faces the star in eternal daylight and the other side permanently faces away from the star in eternal darkness.

== Discovery ==
In 2009, NASA's Kepler spacecraft was observing stars on its photometer, the instrument it uses to detect transit events, in which a planet crosses in front of and dims its host star for a brief and roughly regular period of time. In its last test, Kepler observed 50000 stars in the Kepler Input Catalog, including Kepler-90; the preliminary light curves were sent to the Kepler science team for analysis, who chose obvious planetary companions from the bunch for follow-up at observatories. Discovery of the exoplanet was aided by a newly utilized computer tool, deep learning, a class of machine learning algorithms.

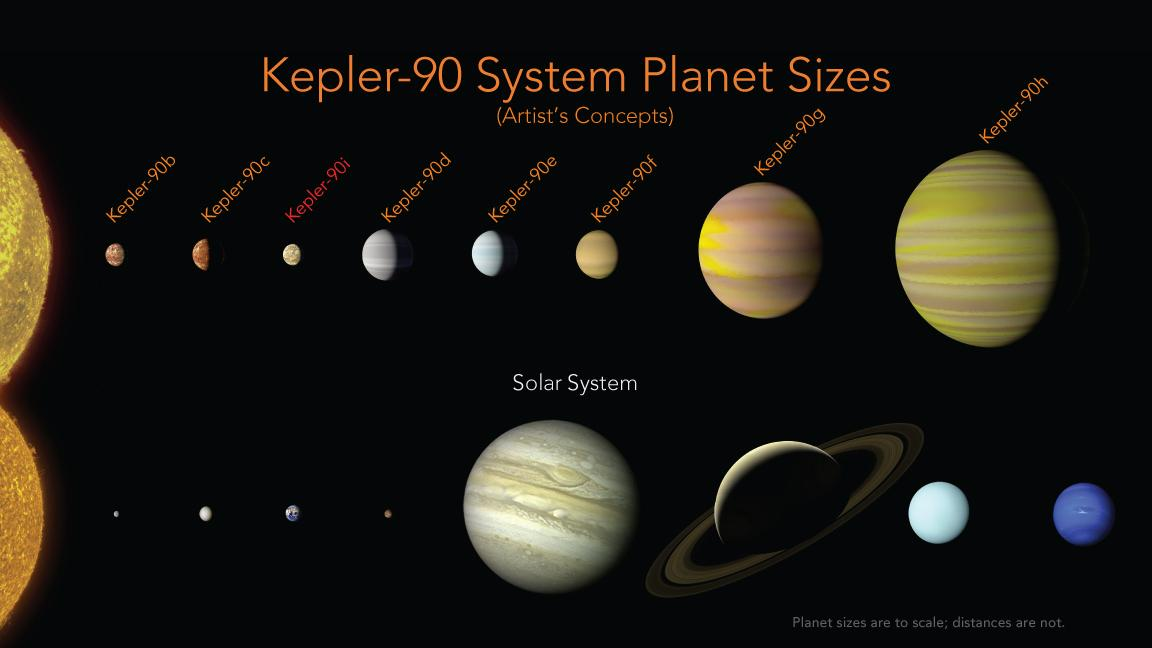
Artist's impression of the planets of the Kepler-90 exoplanetary system compared to the eight planets of the Solar System.

== See also ==
- Kepler-80g
