= Kepler-385 =

F-type main-sequence star in the constellation Cygnus

Observation data Epoch J2000 Equinox ICRS
- Constellation: Cygnus
- Right ascension: 19^{h} 37^{m} 21.23819^{s}
- Declination: +50° 20′ 11.5477″
- Apparent magnitude (V): 15.76

Characteristics
- Evolutionary stage: main sequence
- Spectral type: F

Astrometry
| Proper motion (μ) | RA: +2.738 mas/yr Dec.: −5.398 mas/yr |
| Parallax (π) | 0.6597±0.0183 mas |
| Distance | 4,900 ± 100 ly (1,520 ± 40 pc) |

Details
| Mass | 0.99±0.03 M_{☉} |
| Radius | 1.09±0.05 R_{☉} |
| Luminosity | 1.5 L_{☉} |
| Surface gravity (log g) | 4.19±0.10 cgs |
| Temperature | 5835±64 K |
| Metallicity [Fe/H] | 0.010±0.037 dex |
| Rotation | 25.11 days |
| Rotational velocity (v sin i) | 2.80 km/s |
| Age | 7.6 Gyr |

Other designations
- Kepler-385, KOI-2433, KIC 11968463, TIC 27082352, 2MASS J19372123+5020115

Database references
| SIMBAD | data |
| Exoplanet Archive | data |

Kepler-385 (also designated KOI-2433) is an F-type main-sequence star located about 4,900 light-years (1,500 parsecs) away from Earth in the constellation of Cygnus. The star is 10% larger and 5% hotter than the Sun. The star has at least three, and potentially up to seven, exoplanets discovered orbiting it.

The star has a mass of 1.05 solar masses, a radius of 1.157 solar radii, a temperature of 5829 Kelvin and a luminosity of 1.39 times the solar luminosity.

== Planetary system ==
Kepler-385 was observed by the Kepler space telescope, which initially detected a total of seven planet candidates. Two of these, KOI-2433.01 & .02, were confirmed in 2014 as Kepler-385 b & c, and a third, KOI-2433.03, was confirmed in 2020 as Kepler-385 d. These confirmations were part of studies using statistical validation to confirm large numbers of Kepler candidates. The candidate KOI-2433.05 was shown to be a false positive.

In 2023, a new updated catalog of Kepler candidates was presented, including an eighth candidate around Kepler-385, KOI-2433.08, making it a candidate seven-planet system. Kepler-385 is tied with Kepler-90 – a confirmed eight-planet system – as the Kepler system with the most planet candidates.

The Kepler-385 planetary system
| Companion (in order from star) | Mass | Semimajor axis (AU) | Orbital period (days) | Eccentricity | Inclination (°) | Radius |
|---|---|---|---|---|---|---|
| .08 (unconfirmed) | — | — | 3.37376±0.00003 | — | — | 1.206+0.110 −0.101 R_{🜨} |
| .06 (unconfirmed) | — | 0.067 | 6.06325±0.00006 | — | — | 1.441+0.129 −0.106 R_{🜨} |
| b | — | 0.097 | 10.04381±0.00008 | — | — | 2.313+0.210 −0.162 R_{🜨} |
| c | — | 0.127 | 15.16213±0.00014 | — | — | 2.406+0.549 −0.146 R_{🜨} |
| .04 (unconfirmed) | — | 0.189 | 27.90426±0.00040 | — | — | 1.903+0.184 −0.142 R_{🜨} |
| d | — | 0.302 | 56.41581±0.00135 | — | — | 2.423+0.210 −0.161 R_{🜨} |
| .07 (unconfirmed) | — | 0.402 | 86.43086±0.00205 | — | — | 2.252±0.199 R_{🜨} |
