= BD+48 740 =

Giant star in the constellation Perseus

Observation data Epoch J2000 Equinox ICRS
- Constellation: Perseus
- Right ascension: 02^{h} 42^{m} 58.21847^{s}
- Declination: +48° 55′ 48.2241″
- Apparent magnitude (V): 8.70

Characteristics
- Evolutionary stage: red giant branch
- Spectral type: K3III

Astrometry
Radial velocity (R_{v})	−5.60±0.51 km/s
Proper motion (μ)	RA: −5.262 mas/yr Dec.: −1.026 mas/yr
Parallax (π)	1.6923±0.0227 mas
Distance	1,930 ± 30 ly (591 ± 8 pc)

Details
Mass	1.09±0.16 M_{☉}
Radius	10.33±1.81 R_{☉}
Luminosity	43.7 L_{☉}
Surface gravity (log g)	2.48±0.04 cgs
Temperature	4534±8 K
Metallicity [Fe/H]	−0.13±0.06 dex
Rotational velocity (v sin i)	<2.9 km/s

Other designations
- BD+48 740, AG+48 308, GSC 03304-00090, HIC 12684, HIP 12684, 2MASS J02425822+4855483, PPM 45405, SAO 38272, TYC 3304-90-1

Database references
SIMBAD	data

BD+48 740 is a giant star suspected of having recently engulfed one of its planets. The star's atmosphere has an overabundance of lithium, a metal that is destroyed by nuclear reactions in stars.

== Planetary system ==
Detection of variations in the star's radial velocity led to the discovery of the superjovian planet BD+48 740 b in 2012, with the discovery having been confirmed in 2018. The planet BD+48 740 b has a minimal mass of 1.7M_{J} and is in a highly eccentric orbit (its distance from the star ranges from 0.3 to 3 astronomical units), which would destabilize the orbits of any other planets. These indications led the discoverers to the conclusion that another planet has recently plunged into the star, been destroyed, and contributed its lithium content to the star.

The BD+48 740 planetary system
Companion (in order from star)	Mass	Semimajor axis (AU)	Orbital period (days)	Eccentricity	Inclination (°)	Radius
b	>1.7±0.7 M_{J}	1.7±0.1	733^{+5}_{−8}	0.76^{+0.05}_{−0.09}	—	—
