= Lambda2 Tucanae =

Binary star in the constellation Tucana

Lambda^{2} Tucanae
Observation data Epoch J2000.0 Equinox J2000.0 (ICRS)
- Constellation: Tucana
- Right ascension: 00^{h} 55^{m} 00.31129^{s}
- Declination: −69° 31′ 37.5025″
- Apparent magnitude (V): +5.45

Characteristics
- Spectral type: K2 III
- B−V color index: +1.10

Astrometry
Radial velocity (R_{v})	+5.1±2.8 km/s
Proper motion (μ)	RA: +6.842 mas/yr Dec.: −43.735 mas/yr
Parallax (π)	14.6214±0.0817 mas
Distance	223 ± 1 ly (68.4 ± 0.4 pc)
Absolute magnitude (M_{V})	+1.29

Details
Mass	1.75 M_{☉}
Radius	9.84+0.22 −0.42 R_{☉}
Luminosity	39.2±0.3 L_{☉}
Surface gravity (log g)	2.74 cgs
Temperature	4,605+101 −52 K
Metallicity [Fe/H]	−0.07±0.14 dex
Rotational velocity (v sin i)	3.14 km/s

Other designations
- λ^{2} Tuc, CD−70°40, FK5 34, HD 5457, HIP 4293, HR 270, SAO 248281

Database references
SIMBAD	data

Lambda^{2} Tucanae is a solitary star in the southern constellation of Tucana. It is faintly visible to the naked eye with an apparent visual magnitude of +5.45. Based upon an annual parallax shift of 14.6 mas as seen from Earth, it is located around 223 light years from the Sun. At that distance, the visual magnitude of the star is diminished by an extinction factor of 0.09 due to interstellar dust.

This is an orange-hued K-type giant star on the red giant branch, with a stellar classification of K2 III. It has an estimated 1.75 times the mass of the Sun but after evolving away from the main sequence it has expanded to 9.8 times the Sun's radius. The star is radiating 39 times the solar luminosity from its photosphere at an effective temperature of 4,605 K.
