= Pi Tucanae =

Star in the constellation Tucana

Observation data Epoch J2000.0 Equinox J2000.0 (ICRS)
- Constellation: Tucana
- Right ascension: 0^{h} 20^{m} 39.03682^{s}
- Declination: −69° 37′ 29.6821″
- Apparent magnitude (V): +5.49

Characteristics
- Evolutionary stage: main sequence
- Spectral type: B9 V
- U−B color index: −0.11
- B−V color index: −0.05

Astrometry
| Radial velocity (R_{v}) | +10.50±2.60 km/s |
| Proper motion (μ) | RA: −3.53 mas/yr Dec.: −0.10 mas/yr |
| Parallax (π) | 10.25±0.21 mas |
| Distance | 318 ± 7 ly (98 ± 2 pc) |
| Absolute magnitude (M_{V}) | +0.57 |

Details

π Tuc A
| Mass | 2.8+0.21 −0.18 M_{☉} |
| Luminosity | 59 L_{☉} |
| Surface gravity (log g) | 4.0±0.14 cgs |
| Temperature | 11,393±387 K |
| Rotational velocity (v sin i) | 236 km/s |
| Age | 206+48 −79 Myr |

π Tuc B
| Mass | 0.60 M_{☉} |
| Radius | 0.553 (Note: calculated using temperature and luminosity) R_{☉} |
| Luminosity | 0.063 L_{☉} |
| Temperature | 3,890 K |

Other designations
- π Tuc, CPD−70°12, FK5 2018, HD 1685, HIP 1647, HR 83, SAO 248167

Database references
| SIMBAD | data |

Pi Tucanae (π Tuc, π Tucanae) is a double star in the southern constellation of Tucana. It is visible to the naked eye with a combined apparent visual magnitude of +5.49. Based upon an annual parallax shift of 10.25 mas as seen from Earth, it is located around 317 light years from the Sun.

The brighter star, component A, is a B-type main sequence star with a stellar classification of B9 V. At an age of about 206 million years, it is spinning rapidly with a projected rotational velocity of 236. The star has an estimated 2.8 times the mass of the Sun and radiates 59 times the solar luminosity from its photosphere at an effective temperature of 11,393 K.

There is a nearby visual companion, component B, but the two stars may not form a physical pair. This star has a K-band magnitude of 10.1 and is a source of X-ray emission. It has 60% of the Sun's mass and just 6.3% of the Sun's luminosity, with an effective temperature of 3,890 K. The pair have an angular separation of 2.28 arc seconds along a position angle of 211.4°, which corresponds to a projected separation of 214.1 AU.
