= Lambda1 Tucanae =

Binary star system in the constellation Tucana

Lambda^{1} Tucanae
Observation data Epoch J2000.0 Equinox ICRS
- Constellation: Tucana
- A
- Right ascension: 00^{h} 52^{m} 24.5198^{s}
- Declination: −69° 30′ 13.544″
- Apparent magnitude (V): 6.70
- B
- Right ascension: 00^{h} 52^{m} 28.3487^{s}
- Declination: −69° 30′ 10.382″
- Apparent magnitude (V): 7.35

Characteristics

A
- Spectral type: F7 IV-V
- U−B color index: +0.07
- B−V color index: +0.55

B
- Spectral type: G0/2V

Astrometry

A
Radial velocity (R_{v})	+29.4±0.2 km/s
Proper motion (μ)	RA: 3.849±0.050 mas/yr Dec.: −67.462±0.040 mas/yr
Parallax (π)	16.4907±0.0293 mas
Distance	197.8 ± 0.4 ly (60.6 ± 0.1 pc)
Absolute magnitude (M_{V})	+2.68

B
Proper motion (μ)	RA: 9.966±0.062 mas/yr Dec.: −79.096±0.052 mas/yr
Parallax (π)	16.5242±0.0361 mas
Distance	197.4 ± 0.4 ly (60.5 ± 0.1 pc)

Details

A
Mass	1.55 M_{☉}
Luminosity	7 L_{☉}
Surface gravity (log g)	3.90 cgs
Temperature	6,325 K
Metallicity [Fe/H]	+0.09 dex
Age	2.6 Gyr

B
Mass	1.38 M_{☉}
Radius	1.86 R_{☉}
Luminosity	3.534 L_{☉}
Surface gravity (log g)	3.94 cgs
Temperature	5,797 K
Metallicity [Fe/H]	+0.04 dex
Rotational velocity (v sin i)	3.6 km/s

Other designations
- DUN 2, CCDM J00524-6930AB, WDS J00524-6930AB
- A: λ^{1} Tucanae, CPD−70 37, HD 5190, HIP 4084, HR 252, SAO 248269
- B: CPD−70 38, HD 5208, HIP 4088, SAO 248271

Database references
SIMBAD	data
- companion

Lambda^{1} Tucanae is the Bayer designation for one member of a pair of stars sharing a common proper motion through space, which lie within the southern constellation of Tucana. As of 2013, the pair had an angular separation of 20.0 arc seconds along a position angle of 82°. Together, they are barely visible to the naked eye with a combined apparent visual magnitude of 6.21. Based upon an annual parallax shift for both stars of approximately 16.5 mas as seen from Earth, this system is located roughly 198 light years from the Sun.

The brighter member, component A, is a magnitude 6.70 F-type star with a stellar classification of F7 IV-V. The luminosity class may indicate that, at the age of 2.6 billion years, it is beginning to evolve away from the main sequence. It has an estimated 1.55 times the mass of the Sun and is radiating 7 times the solar luminosity from its photosphere at an effective temperature of 6,325 K. The magnitude 7.35 companion, component B, has 1.38 times the mass of the Sun. If the pair are gravitationally bound, then their estimated orbital period is 27,000 years.
