= HAT-P-38b =

Transiting exoplanet in Triangulum

HAT-P-38b / Hiisi
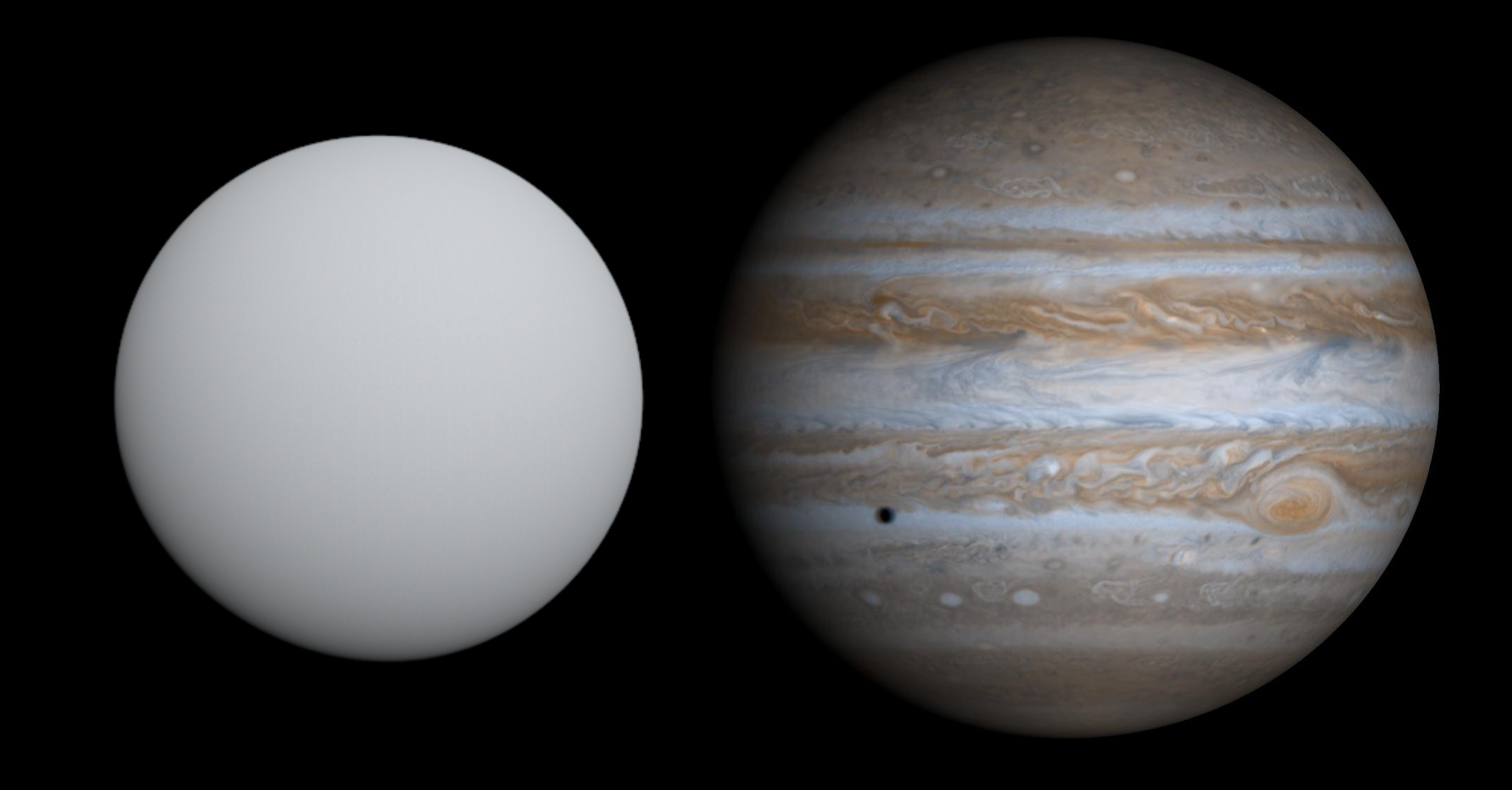
- HAT-P-38b (grey) compared to Jupiter.

Discovery
- Discovered by: Sato et al. (HATNet)
- Discovery date: October 2012
- Detection method: Transit

Orbital characteristics
- Periastron: 0.04943 AU
- Apoastron: 0.05519 AU
- Semi-major axis: 0.05231+0.00085 −0.00089 AU
- Eccentricity: <0.055
- Orbital period (sidereal): 4.6403288±0.0000011 d
- Inclination: 88.3°±0.7°
- Argument of periastron: 240°±104°
- Semi-amplitude: 35.4±2.4 km/s
- Star: HAT-P-38

Physical characteristics
- Mean radius: 0.825+0.092 −0.063 R_{J}
- Mass: 0.267±0.020 M_{J}
- Mean density: 0.59 ± 0.16 g/cm^{3}
- Surface gravity: 9.77±0.26 m/s^{2}
- Temperature: 1,082 ± 55 K (808.9 ± 55.0 °C; 1,487.9 ± 99.0 °F)

HAT-P-38b, formally named Hiisi, is a transiting exoplanet orbiting the G-type star HAT-P-38 821 light-years from the Solar System in the constellation Triangulum.

== Nomenclature ==
The planet's designation is derived from the host star's designation and the fact that it was the first planet to be discovered around the star, hence the "b" in its name. In 2019, it was selected for the second NameExoWorlds campaign for Finland as part of the IAU's 100th anniversary. The approved name for the planet is Hiisi, which represents sacred localities and later evil spirits from Finnic mythology. It shares this name with the binary companion of the trans-Neptunian object 47171 Lempo.

== Discovery ==
The transits of HAT-P-38 were first observed between August and November 2010 by using two telescopes related to the HATNet Project: The HAT-6 telescope in Arizona and the HAT-8 telescope in Hawaii. Astronomers observed a transit curve with a period of 4.64033 days. Later observations of the star's radial velocity using the High Dispersion Spectrograph confirmed HAT-P-38b's planetary status and it also yielded its mass in the process.

== Properties ==
HAT-P-38b is a hot Saturn that takes over 4 days to circle its host star in a relatively circular and tight orbit; it has a separation of 0.0519 astronomical units. HAT-P-38b has 26.6% the mass of Jupiter, which is similar to that of Saturn. However, tidal heating from HAT-P-38 causes the planet to bloat to 82.5% the radius of Jupiter. It has an equilibrium temperature of 1,082 K. The planet has a density of 590 kg/m^{3}, which is half of that of water (the density of water is 1,000 kg/m^{3}). The average gravitational acceleration of the planet is 9.77 m/s^{2}, which is slightly smaller compared to the gravitational acceleration at the surface of the Earth.

In 2017, the atmospheres of HAT-P-38b and WASP-67b were compared since both planets had similar properties. Giovanni Bruno and colleagues detected water vapor in both planets, with HAT-P-38b having the greater abundance in its atmosphere. This indicates that the atmosphere lacks clouds or hazes.

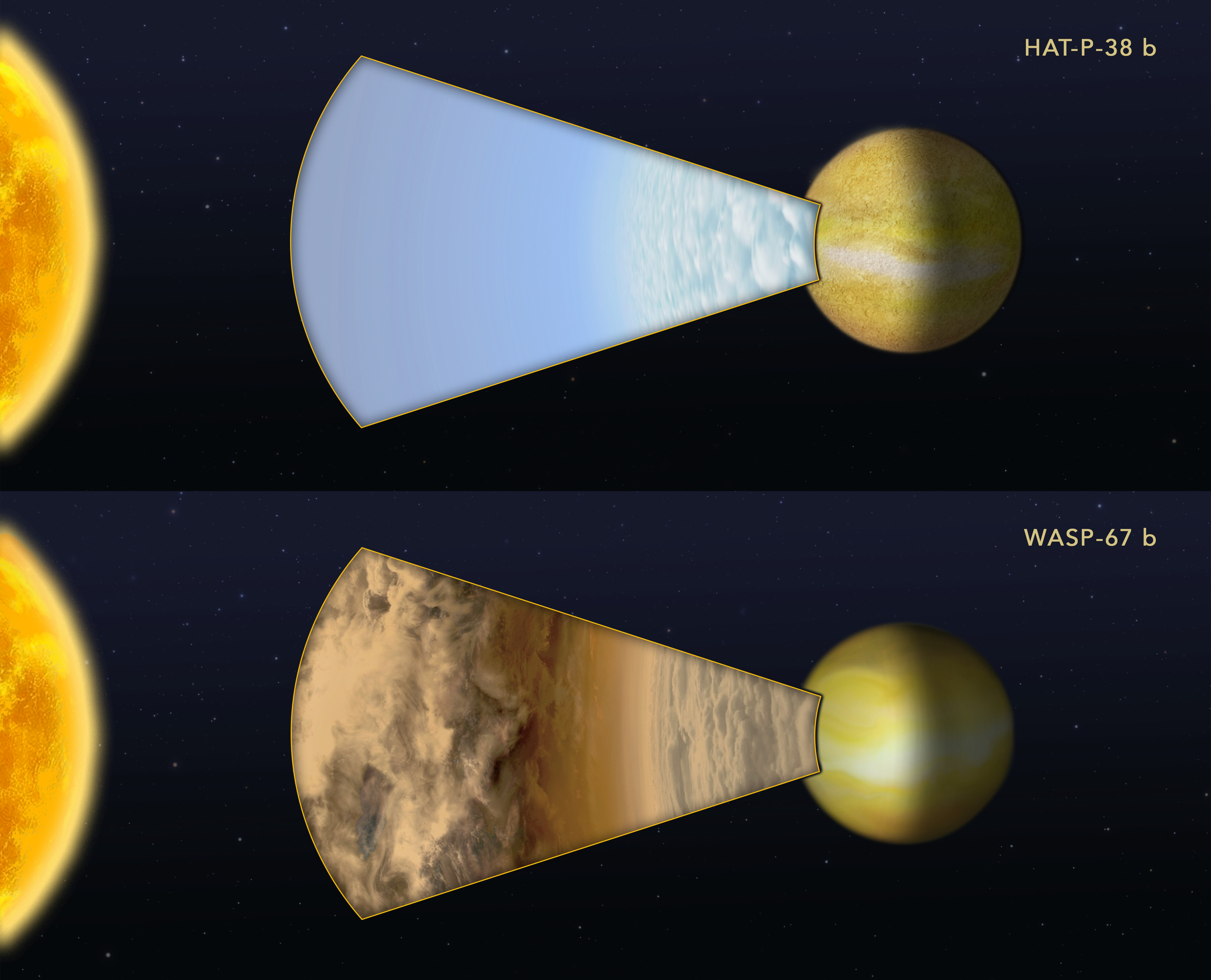
The atmospheres of HAT-P-38b and WASP-67b based on 2018 data

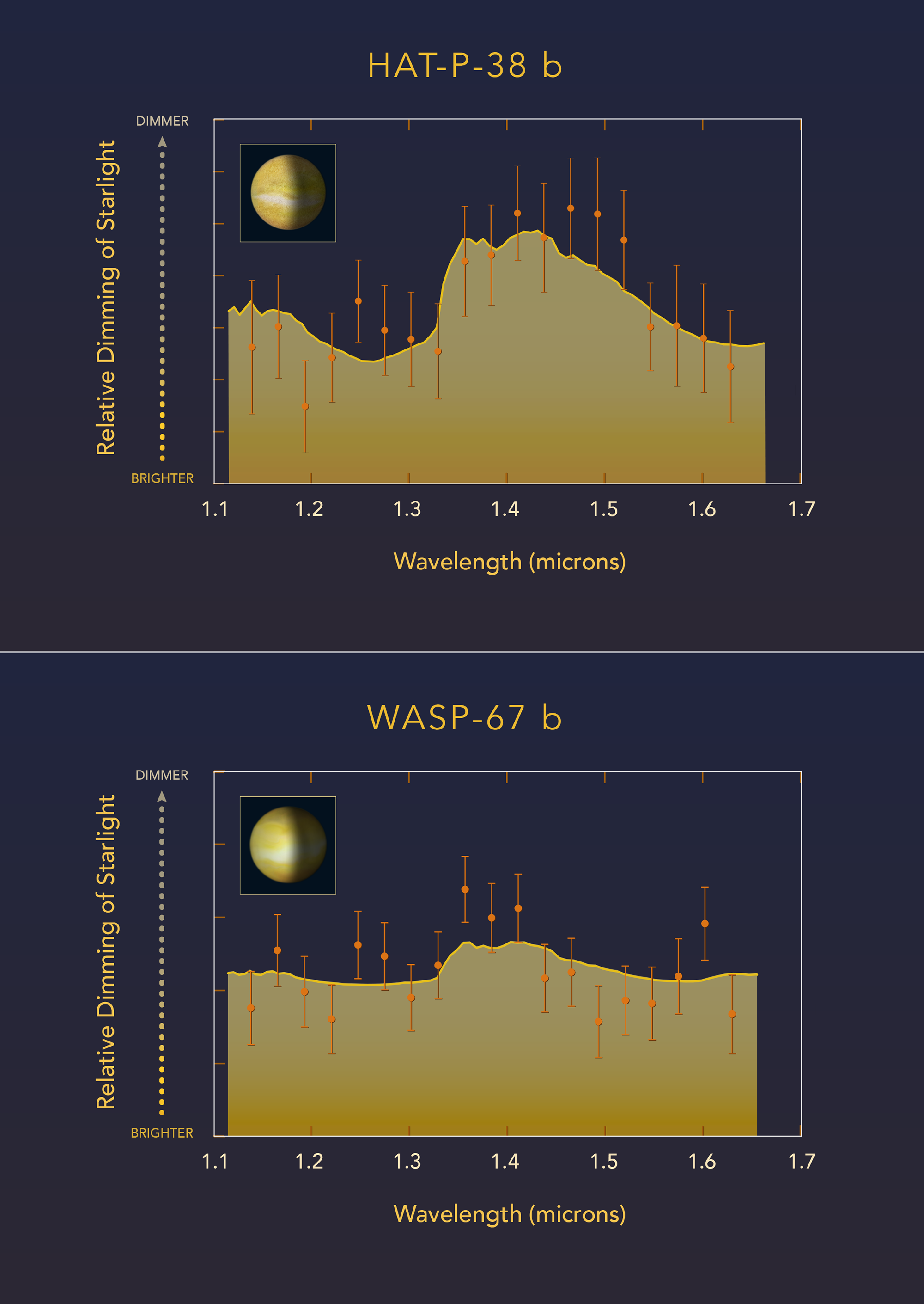
The emission spectra of HAT-P-38b and WASP-67b
