= HD 166724 =

Star in the constellation Corona Australis

Observation data Epoch J2000.0 Equinox ICRS
- Constellation: Corona Australis
- Right ascension: 18^{h} 13^{m} 59.67590^{s}
- Declination: −42° 34′ 31.3558″
- Apparent magnitude (V): +9.33

Characteristics
- Evolutionary stage: main sequence
- Spectral type: K0IV/V
- B−V color index: 0.861±0.032

Astrometry
Radial velocity (R_{v})	−17.51±0.20 km/s
Proper motion (μ)	RA: +36.061 mas/yr Dec.: −80.180 mas/yr
Parallax (π)	22.0344±0.0177 mas
Distance	148.0 ± 0.1 ly (45.38 ± 0.04 pc)
Absolute magnitude (M_{V})	6.20

Details
Mass	0.81±0.02 M_{☉}
Radius	0.80+0.01 −0.02 R_{☉}
Luminosity	0.388±0.001 L_{☉}
Surface gravity (log g)	4.43±0.08 cgs
Temperature	5,101+50 −41 K
Metallicity [Fe/H]	−0.09±0.03 dex
Age	4.0±3.8 Gyr

Other designations
- CD−42°13019, HD 166724, HIP 89354

Database references
SIMBAD	data
Exoplanet Archive	data

HD 166724 is a star in the southern constellation of Corona Australis. It is invisible to the naked eye with an apparent visual magnitude of +9.33. The star is located at a distance of 148 light-years (45 parsecs) from the Sun based on parallax, but is drifting closer with a radial velocity of −18 km/s. It is predicted to come as close as 97.0 light-years in around 1.2 million years from now. The star has an absolute magnitude of 6.20.

The stellar classification of HD 166724 is K0IV/V, showing blended features of a K-type main-sequence star with a more evolved subgiant star. It is slightly active with chromospheric activity being demonstrated by an emission peak in the Ca II K absorption line. The age of the star is poorly constrained, but it is spinning slowly with a period of around 30 days. It has 81% of the mass of the Sun and 80% of the Sun's girth. The star is radiating 39% of the luminosity of the Sun from its photosphere at an effective temperature of 5,101 K.

== Planetary system ==
From 1998 to 2012, the star was under observance from the CORALIE echelle spectrograph at La Silla Observatory. In 2012, a long-period, wide-orbiting exoplanet was deduced by radial velocity variations. This was published in November. The discoverers noted that HD 166724 b is among "the three most eccentric planets with a period larger than 5 years" alongside HD 98649 b and HD 219077 b; but unlike them, too dim as a candidate for direct imaging with current technology. The reason for this high orbital eccentricity is unknown. In 2023, the inclination and true mass of HD 166724 b were determined via astrometry.

The HD 166724 planetary system
Companion (in order from star)	Mass	Semimajor axis (AU)	Orbital period (years)	Eccentricity	Inclination (°)	Radius
b	3.8+0.65 −0.29 M_{J}	5.17+0.38 −0.49	13.0+1.4 −1.8	0.729+0.018 −0.017	68+15 −16 or 112+16 −15	—
