= HD 222155 =

Old G-type main sequence star in the constellation Andromeda

Observation data Epoch J2000 Equinox ICRS
- Constellation: Andromeda
- Right ascension: 23^{h} 38^{m} 00.30719^{s}
- Declination: +48° 59′ 47.4874″
- Apparent magnitude (V): 7.1

Characteristics
- Evolutionary stage: subgiant
- Spectral type: G0

Astrometry
| Radial velocity (R_{v}) | −44.00±0.12 km/s |
| Proper motion (μ) | RA: 195.306 mas/yr Dec.: -117.335 mas/yr |
| Parallax (π) | 19.8020±0.0160 mas |
| Distance | 164.7 ± 0.1 ly (50.50 ± 0.04 pc) |
| Absolute magnitude (M_{V}) | +3.66 |

Details
| Mass | 1.0±0.1 M_{☉} |
| Radius | 1.8±0.1 R_{☉} |
| Luminosity | 3.2±0.1 L_{☉} |
| Surface gravity (log g) | 3.93±0.08 cgs |
| Temperature | 5,741±133 K |
| Metallicity [Fe/H] | −0.22±0.04 dex |
| Rotation | 10.08 days |
| Rotational velocity (v sin i) | 3.8 km/s |
| Age | 8.0±0.4 Gyr |

Other designations
- BD+48 4112, HD 222155, HIP 116616, SAO 53211, TYC 3646-2286-1, 2MASS J23380027+4859475, Gaia DR2 1943363751009454976

Database references
| SIMBAD | data |

HD 222155 is a star in the northern constellation of Andromeda. It is a yellow star that can be viewed with binoculars or a small telescope, but is too faint to be seen with the naked eye at an apparent visual magnitude of 7.1. The imaging survey in 2017 did not detect any stellar companions to HD 222155.

This is a G-type star with a stellar classification of G0. It has exhausted the hydrogen fuel in its core and begun to evolve towards a red giant; it is currently on the subgiant branch. It has begun to expand its gaseous envelope, having a radius of 1.8 R_{☉} with a mass almost the same as the Sun's The star is relatively depleted of heavy elements, having about 80% of solar abundance, and has weak yet noticeable ultraviolet flare activity.

== Planetary system ==
Based on radial velocity data gathered in 2007–2011, the discovery of a superjovian planet b outside the habitable zone was announced in May 2012. The stellar and planetary parameters were refined in 2016. In 2023, the inclination and true mass of HD 222155 b were measured via astrometry.

The HD 222155 planetary system
| Companion (in order from star) | Mass | Semimajor axis (AU) | Orbital period (days) | Eccentricity | Inclination (°) | Radius |
|---|---|---|---|---|---|---|
| b | 2.1+0.3 −0.2 M_{J} | 4.7±0.1 | 3470+102 −106 | 0.34±0.09 | 66+14 −11 or 115+13 −16 | — |
