= Iota Tucanae =

Star in the constellation Tucana

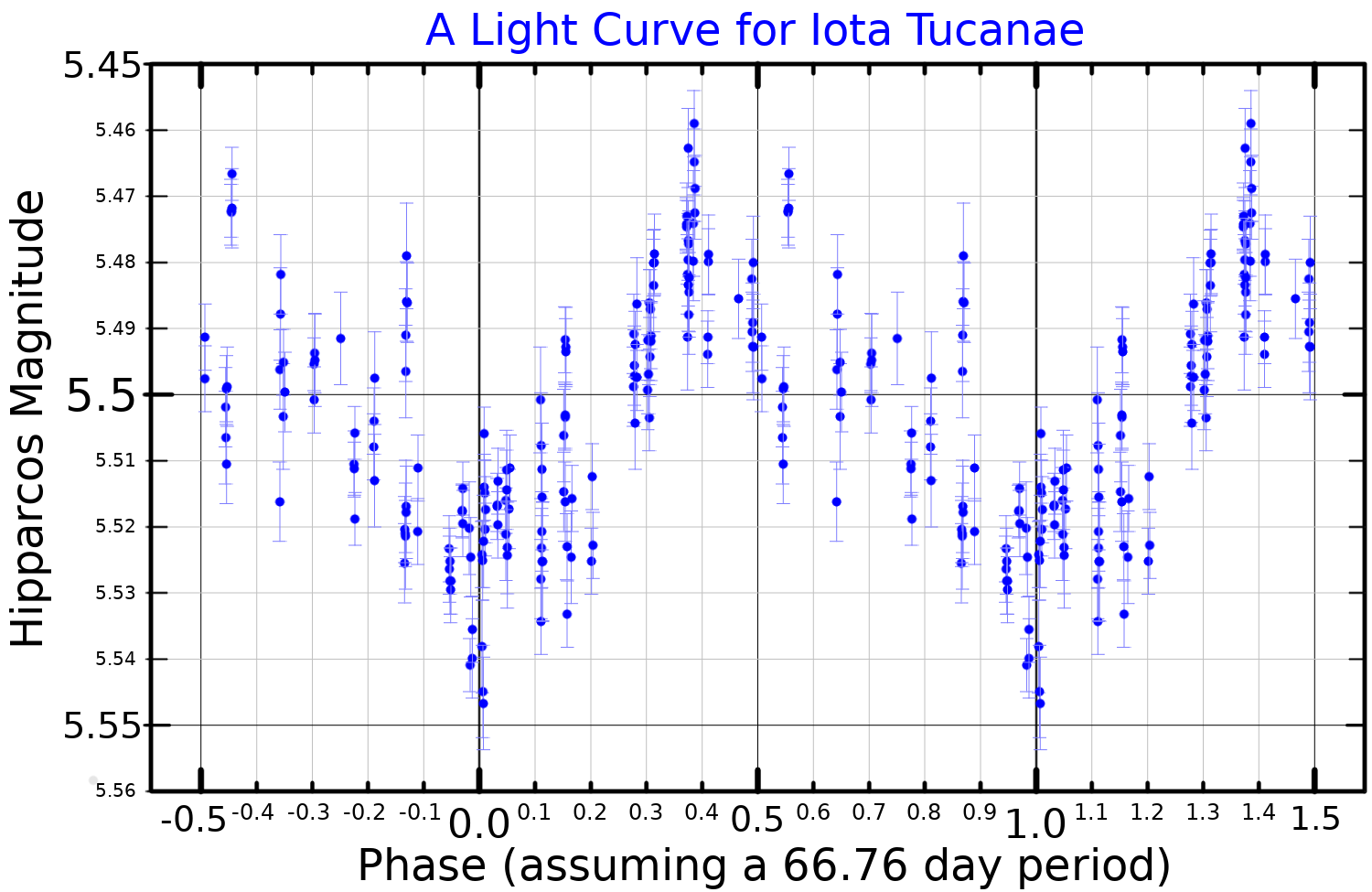
- A light curve for Iota Tucanae, plotted from Hipparcos data

Observation data Epoch J2000.0 Equinox J2000.0 (ICRS)
- Constellation: Tucana
- Right ascension: 01^{h} 07^{m} 18.66365^{s}
- Declination: −61° 46′ 31.0434″
- Apparent magnitude (V): +5.33

Characteristics
- Spectral type: G5 III
- B−V color index: +0.89
- Variable type: semi-regular

Astrometry
Radial velocity (R_{v})	−7.80 km/s
Proper motion (μ)	RA: +73.80 mas/yr Dec.: −11.55 mas/yr
Parallax (π)	10.72±0.23 mas
Distance	304 ± 7 ly (93 ± 2 pc)
Absolute magnitude (M_{V})	0.70

Details
Mass	2.20 M_{☉}
Radius	11 R_{☉}
Luminosity	65 L_{☉}
Surface gravity (log g)	3.15±0.13 cgs
Temperature	5,039±63 K
Metallicity [Fe/H]	−0.02±0.08 dex
Rotational velocity (v sin i)	5.8±3.5 km/s
Age	1.69 Gyr

Other designations
- ι Tuc, CPD−62°89, FK5 39, HD 6793, HIP 5268, HR 332, SAO 248324

Database references
SIMBAD	data

Iota Tucanae (ι Tuc, ι Tucanae) is a solitary star in the southern constellation of Tucana. Based upon an annual parallax shift of 10.72 mas as seen from Earth, it is located around 304 light years from the Sun. With an apparent visual magnitude of +5.33, it is faintly visible to the naked eye.

This is a yellow-hued G-type giant star with a stellar classification of G5 III. The variability of the brightness of Iota Tucanae was discovered when the Hipparcos data was analyzed. It is classified as a semiregular variable star, showing a periodicity of 66.8 days with an amplitude of 0.0202 in visual magnitude. Iota Tucanae is an X-ray source with a luminosity of 817.6×10^{28} erg s^{−1}. It has an estimated 2.2 times the mass of the Sun, and, at the age of 1.69 billion years, it has evolved away from the main sequence, expanding to 11 times the Sun's radius. The star radiates 65 times the solar luminosity from its photosphere at an effective temperature of 5,039 K.
