= Kepler-36b =

Suspected lava-like super-Earth orbiting Kepler-36

Discovery
- Discovery date: 2012
- Detection method: Transit (Kepler Mission)

Orbital characteristics
- Semi-major axis: 0.1153 AU (17,250,000 km)
- Eccentricity: <0.04
- Orbital period (sidereal): 13.83989 d
- Inclination: ~90
- Star: Kepler-36 (KOI-277)

Physical characteristics
- Mean radius: 1.486 R_{🜨}
- Mass: 4.45 M_{🜨}
- Mean density: 6.8 g/cm^{3} (0.25 lb/cu in)
- Temperature: 978±11 K

Kepler-36b is an exoplanet orbiting the star Kepler-36. This planet has the closest conjunction to Kepler-36c every 97 days. Its density is similar to that of iron.

During their closest approach, Kepler-36b and Kepler-36c are located only 0.013 AU (about 1,900,000 km) from each other, which causes extreme transit-timing variations for both planets. Transit-timing variations caused by Kepler-36c are strong enough to put narrow constraints on Kepler-36b's mass. The close proximity of the planet to its host star combined with its relatively low mass caused the planet to lose all or most of its primordial hydrogen/helium envelope.
