= Kepler-90e =

Super-Earth orbiting Kepler-90

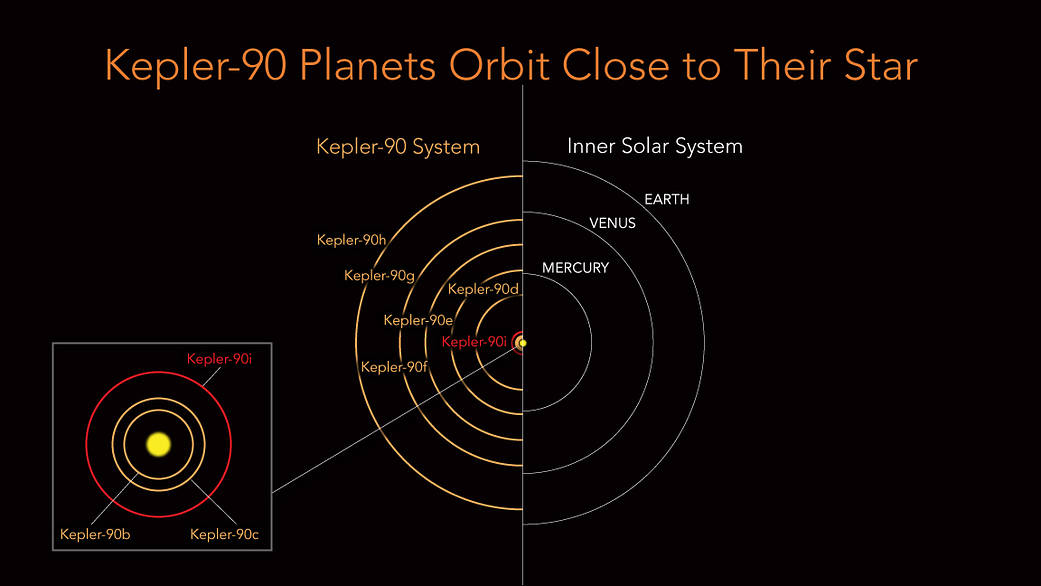
- Illustration of the Kepler-90 system compared to the inner solar system. The orbital distance of Kepler-90e is comparable to that of Mercury, as shown in this illustration.

Discovery
- Discovered by: J. Cabrera et al.
- Discovery date: 23 October 2013
- Detection method: Transit method

Orbital characteristics
- Semi-major axis: 0.42 ± 0.06 AU (62,800,000 ± 9,000,000 km)
- Orbital period (sidereal): 91.93913 ± 0.00073 d
- Inclination: 89.79 ± 0.19
- Star: Kepler-90

Physical characteristics
- Mean radius: 2.66 ± 0.29 R_{🜨}
- Temperature: 453 K (180 °C)

Kepler-90e is an exoplanet orbiting the star Kepler-90, located in the constellation Draco. It was discovered by the Kepler telescope in October 2013. It orbits its parent star at only 0.42 astronomical units away, and at its distance it completes an orbit once every 91.94 days.

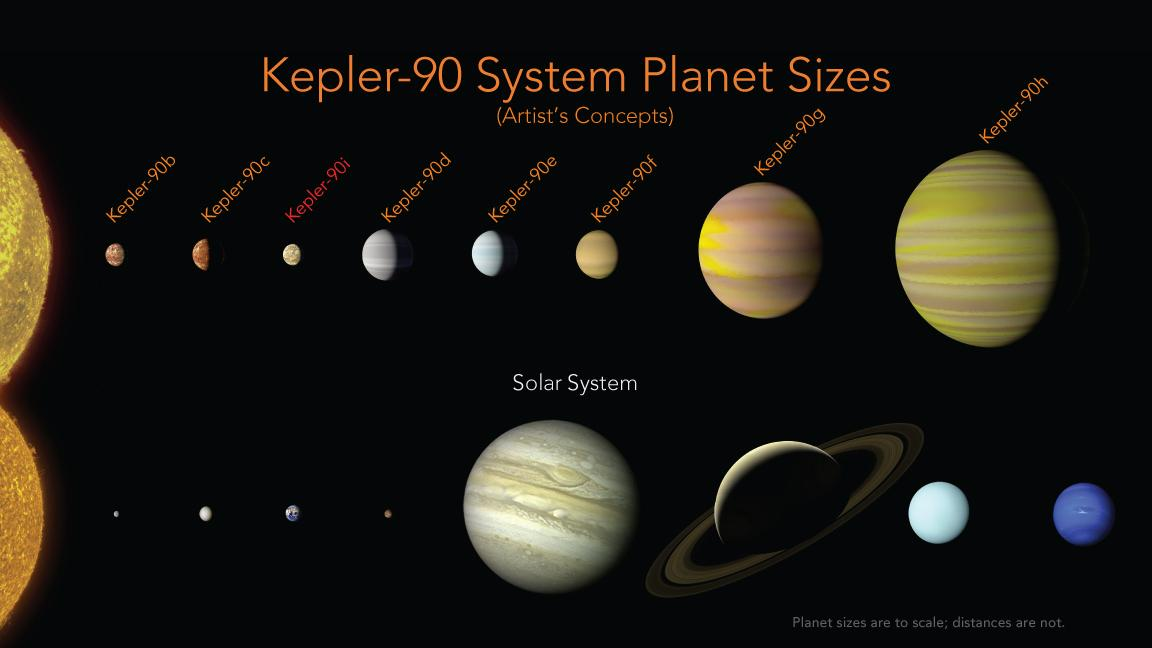
Artist's impression of the planets of the Kepler-90 exoplanetary system compared to the eight planets of the Solar System.

== Host star ==
The planet orbits a G-type star named Kepler-90, its host star. The star is 1.2 times as massive as the Sun and is 1.2 times as large as the Sun. It is estimated to be 2 billion years old, with a surface temperature of 6080 K. In comparison, the Sun is about 4.6 billion years old and has a surface temperature of 5778 K.
