= WASP-67 =

Star in the constellation Sagittarius

Observation data Epoch J2000 Equinox ICRS
- Constellation: Sagittarius
- Right ascension: 19^{h} 42^{m} 58.5218^{s}
- Declination: −19° 56′ 58.521″
- Apparent magnitude (V): 12.54

Characteristics
- Evolutionary stage: Main sequence
- Spectral type: K0V

Astrometry
Radial velocity (R_{v})	−0.76±0.80 km/s
Proper motion (μ)	RA: +1.647 mas/yr Dec.: −33.032 mas/yr
Parallax (π)	5.2720±0.0123 mas
Distance	619 ± 1 ly (189.7 ± 0.4 pc)

Details
Mass	0.91±0.28 M_{☉}
Radius	0.88±0.08 R_{☉}
Luminosity	0.51 L_{☉}
Surface gravity (log g)	4.35±0.15 cgs
Temperature	5200±100 K
Metallicity [Fe/H]	−0.07 dex
Rotational velocity (v sin i)	2.1±0.4 km/s
Age	4.3±3.1 Gyr

Other designations
- WASP-67, TYC 6307-1388-1, 2MASS J19425852-1956585

Database references
SIMBAD	data
Exoplanet Archive	data

WASP-67 is a K-type main-sequence star about 620 light-years away in the constellation Sagittarius. The star's age is poorly constrained. WASP-67 is slightly depleted in heavy elements, having 85% of the solar abundance of iron.

A multiplicity survey in 2016 found one candidate stellar companion to WASP-67 at a projected separation of 4.422″±0.018″. Nonetheless, follow-up observations in 2017 failed to find any bound stellar companions.

== Planetary system ==
In 2012 a transiting hot Jupiter planet, WASP-67b, was detected on a tight, circular orbit. Its equilibrium temperature is 1050 K. The planetary atmosphere contains water, and a cloud layer is located higher than in the similar gas giant HAT-P-38b, indicating a high planetary metallicity.

A second gas giant planet was found in 2026 by the radial velocity method.

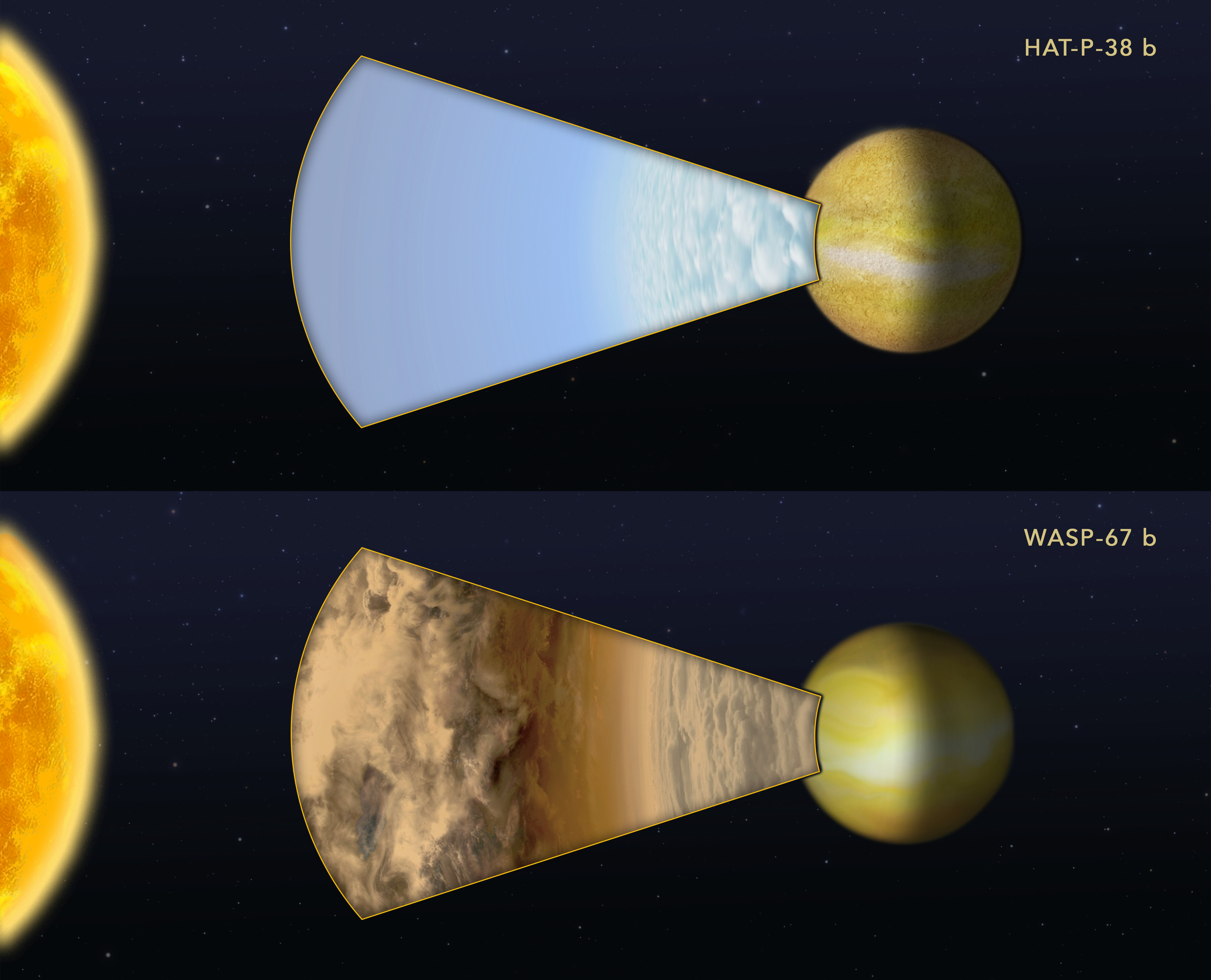
Artist's impression of a clear atmosphere on HAT-P-38b (above) and a cloudy atmosphere on WASP-67b (below)

The WASP-67 planetary system
Companion (in order from star)	Mass	Semimajor axis (AU)	Orbital period (days)	Eccentricity	Inclination (°)	Radius
b	0.389+0.023 −0.022 M_{J}	0.05178+0.00077 −0.00080	4.6144108+0.0000026 −0.0000028	0.033+0.015 −0.033	85.80±0.35	1.15±0.11 R_{J}
c	≥2.88+0.29 −0.31 M_{J}	3.201+0.066 −0.071	2244+46 −50	0.132+0.077 −0.074	—	—
