= HD 219077 =

Star in the constellation Tucana

Observation data Epoch J2000.0 Equinox ICRS
- Constellation: Tucana
- Right ascension: 23^{h} 14^{m} 06.58771^{s}
- Declination: −62° 42′ 00.0081″
- Apparent magnitude (V): +6.12

Characteristics
- Evolutionary stage: subgiant
- Spectral type: G8 V
- B−V color index: 0.787

Astrometry
| Radial velocity (R_{v}) | −31.05±0.12 km/s |
| Proper motion (μ) | RA: 478.297±0.021 mas/yr Dec.: −424.433±0.027 mas/yr |
| Parallax (π) | 34.2500±0.0223 mas |
| Distance | 95.23 ± 0.06 ly (29.20 ± 0.02 pc) |
| Absolute magnitude (M_{V}) | +3.78 |

Details
| Mass | 1.05±0.02 M_{☉} |
| Radius | 1.91±0.03 R_{☉} |
| Luminosity (bolometric) | 2.66 L_{☉} |
| Surface gravity (log g) | 4.00±0.03 cgs |
| Temperature | 5,362±18 K |
| Metallicity [Fe/H] | −0.13±0.01 dex |
| Rotation | 49±4 d |
| Rotational velocity (v sin i) | 1.46 km/s |
| Age | 8.9±0.3 Gyr |

Other designations
- CD−63°1596, HD 219077, HIP 114699, HR 8829

Database references
| SIMBAD | data |
| Exoplanet Archive | data |

HD 219077 is a faint, yellow-hued star in the southern constellation of Tucana. It has an apparent visual magnitude of +6.12, which is near the lower limit on stars visible to the naked eye. Based upon an annual parallax shift of 34.25 mas as seen from Earth, it lies 95 light years from the Sun. HD 219077 is moving closer to the Sun with a radial velocity of −31.01, and has a relatively high proper motion.

This is an ordinary G-type main-sequence star with a stellar classification of G8 V. It has 1.05 times the mass of the Sun and 1.91 times the Sun's radius. The star is older than the Sun with an estimated age of 8.9 billion years and is spinning slowly with rotation period of around 47 days. It is radiating 2.66 times the Sun's luminosity from its photosphere at an effective temperature of 5,362 K.

== Planetary system ==
From 1998 to 2012, the star was placed under observation using the CORALIE echelle spectrograph at La Silla Observatory. In 2012, the presence of a long-period, wide-orbiting planet was deduced through radial velocity variations. This discovery was published in November of the same year. The estimated mass of the planet is at least ten times that of Jupiter.

The discoverers noted that HD 219077 b is among the "three most eccentric planets with a period larger than 5 years" – along with HD 98649 b and HD 166724 b, also found with CORALIE. The reason for this eccentricity is unknown. They submitted HD 219077 b as a candidate for direct imaging, once it gets out to 11.0 AU at apoastron with 375 milliarcseconds of angular separation as seen from Earth. In 2022, the inclination and true mass of HD 219077 b were measured via astrometry.

The HD 219077 planetary system
| Companion (in order from star) | Mass | Semimajor axis (AU) | Orbital period (years) | Eccentricity | Inclination (°) | Radius |
|---|---|---|---|---|---|---|
| b | 9.620+1.001 −0.733 M_{J} | 5.935+0.249 −0.265 | 15.000+0.133 −0.105 | 0.768±0.002 | 90.178+9.462 −9.527 | — |
