= Kepler-36 =

Star in the constellation Cygnus

Observation data Epoch J2000 Equinox ICRS
- Constellation: Cygnus
- Right ascension: 19^{h} 25^{m} 00.0428^{s}
- Declination: +49° 13′ 54.631″
- Apparent magnitude (V): 12.1

Characteristics
- Evolutionary stage: subgiant
- Spectral type: G1IV

Astrometry
Proper motion (μ)	RA: 1.151(11) mas/yr Dec.: −8.064(11) mas/yr
Parallax (π)	1.8528±0.0087 mas
Distance	1,760 ± 8 ly (540 ± 3 pc)

Details
Mass	1.071±0.043 M_{☉}
Radius	1.626±0.019 R_{☉}
Luminosity	3.2 L_{☉}
Surface gravity (log g)	4.1±0.1 cgs
Temperature	5911±66 K
Metallicity [Fe/H]	−0.2±0.06 dex
Rotation	17.20±0.2
Rotational velocity (v sin i)	4.9±1.0 km/s

Other designations
- KOI-277, KIC 11401755, 2MASS J19250004+4913545, Gaia DR2 2129931456691176576

Database references
SIMBAD	data
KIC	data

Kepler-36 is a star in the constellation of Cygnus with two known planets. It has an anomalously large radius, meaning that it is a subgiant.

== Planetary system ==
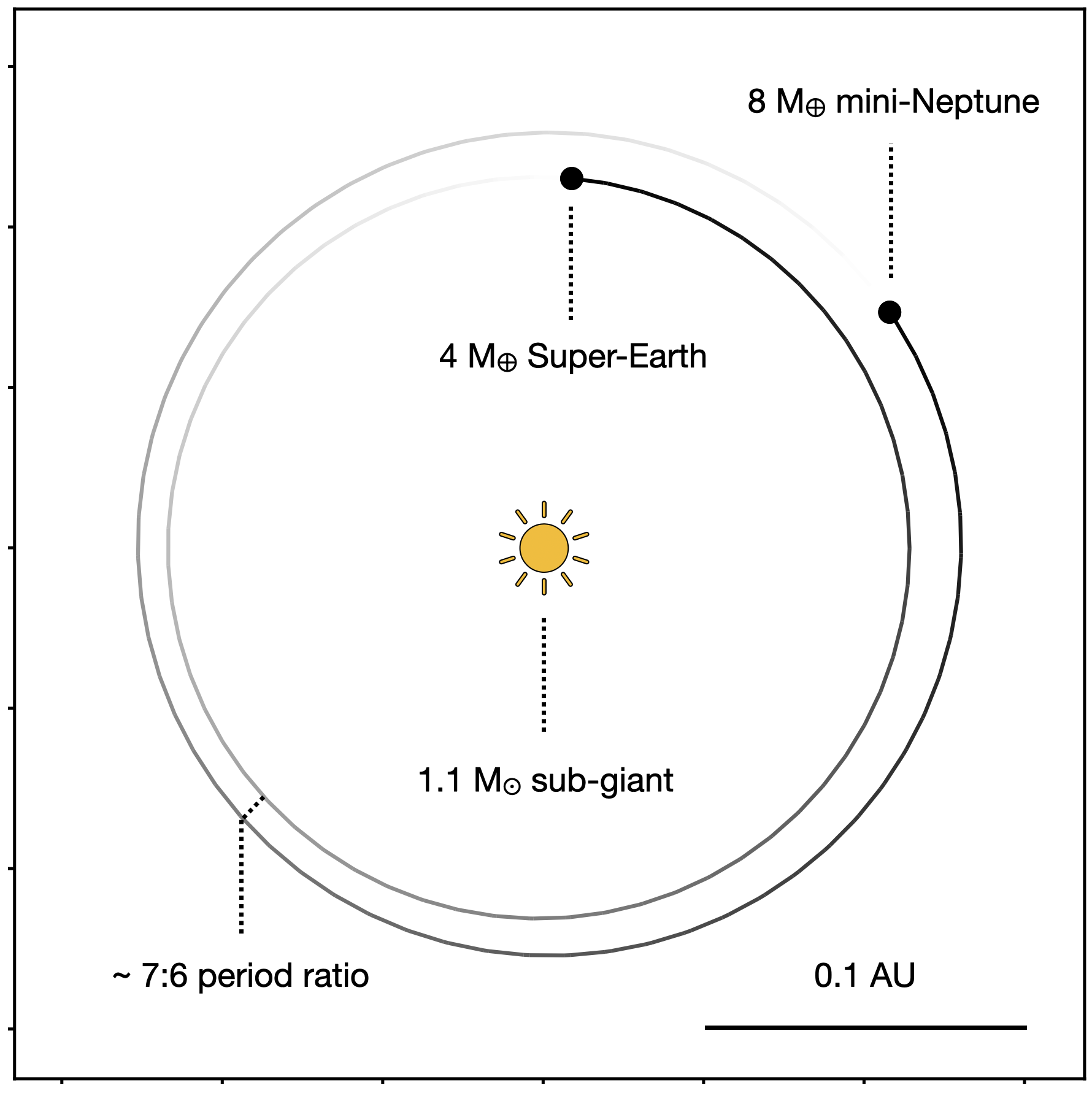
Orbit diagram of the Kepler-36 planetary system

On June 21, 2012, the discovery of two planets orbiting the star was announced. The planets, a super-Earth and a mini-Neptune, are unusual in that they have very close orbits; their semi-major axes differ by only 0.013 AU. The outer planet orbits only 11% farther than the inner one. Coupled with masses significantly higher than Earth, their gravitational influence to each other is significant, meaning that their interaction causes extreme transit timing variations for both. Kepler-36b and c have estimated densities of 6.8 and 0.86 g/cm^{3}, respectively. The two planets are close to a 7:6 orbital resonance. Kepler-36 is the most compact known resonant system with the 7:6 mean-motion resonance marking the last attainable stable period ratio.

The large difference in densities, despite the close proximity of the planets' orbits, is likely due to the large difference in mass. The innermost and less massive planet likely lost most, or all, of the hydrogen/helium envelope acquired during formation.

The Kepler-36 planetary system
Companion (in order from star)	Mass	Semimajor axis (AU)	Orbital period (days)	Eccentricity	Inclination (°)	Radius
b	3.83+0.11 −0.10 M_{🜨}	0.1153	13.86821±0.00049	<0.04	90.0	1.498+0.061 −0.049 R_{🜨}
c	7.13±0.18 M_{🜨}	0.1283	16.21865±0.00010	<0.04	90.0	3.679+0.096 −0.091 R_{🜨}
