= List of stars in Draco =

This is the list of notable stars in the constellation Draco.

Name	B	F	Var	HD	HIP	RA	Dec	vis. mag.	abs. mag.	Dist. (ly)	Sp. class	Notes
γ Dra	γ	33		164058	87833	17^{h} 56^{m} 36.38^{s}	+51° 29′ 20.2″	2.24	−1.04	148	K5III	Eltanin
η Dra	η	14		148387	80331	16^{h} 23^{m} 59.51^{s}	+61° 30′ 50.7″	2.73	0.58	88	G8III	Aldibain, Athebyne
β Dra	β	23		159181	85670	17^{h} 30^{m} 25.98^{s}	+52° 18′ 04.9″	2.79	−2.43	361	G2II	Rastaban, Rastaben, Alwaid, Asuia
δ Dra	δ	57		180711	94376	19^{h} 12^{m} 33.15^{s}	+67° 39′ 40.7″	3.07	0.63	100	G9III	Altais, Nodus Secundus, Nodus II, Aldib
ζ Dra	ζ	22		155763	83895	17^{h} 08^{m} 47.23^{s}	+65° 42′ 52.7″	3.17	−1.92	340	B6III	Aldhibah, Eldsib, Nod, Nodus III, Charlie Jean
ι Dra	ι	12		137759	75458	15^{h} 24^{m} 55.78^{s}	+58° 57′ 57.7″	3.29	0.81	102	K2III	Edasich, Eldsich, Ed Asich, Al Dhiba, Al Dhihi; has a planet (b)
χ Dra	χ	44		170153	89937	18^{h} 21^{m} 02.34^{s}	+72° 44′ 01.3″	3.55	4.02	26	F7Vvar	
Thuban	α	11		123299	68756	14^{h} 04^{m} 23.43^{s}	+64° 22′ 32.9″	3.67	−1.21	309	A0III SB	Adib, Dragon's Tail
ξ Dra	ξ	32		163588	87585	17^{h} 53^{m} 31.63^{s}	+56° 52′ 20.8″	3.73	1.06	111	K2III	Grumium, Genam, Nodus Primus, Nodus I
λ Dra	λ	1		100029	56211	11^{h} 31^{m} 24.29^{s}	+69° 19′ 52.0″	3.82	−1.23	334	M0IIIvar	Giausar, Giauzar, Gianfar, Giansar, Gaiusar, Juza
ε Dra	ε	63		188119	97433	19^{h} 48^{m} 10.21^{s}	+70° 16′ 04.2″	3.84	0.59	146	G8III	Tyl; binary star
κ Dra	κ	5		109387	61281	12^{h} 33^{m} 29.04^{s}	+69° 47′ 17.6″	3.85	−2.07	498	B6IIIp	Shàowèi (少尉); γ Cas variable
θ Dra	θ	13		144284	78527	16^{h} 01^{m} 53.70^{s}	+58° 33′ 52.0″	4.01	2.41	68	F8IV-V	Shàngzǎi (上宰)
φ Dra	φ	43		170000	89908	18^{h} 20^{m} 45.44^{s}	+71° 20′ 15.8″	4.22	−0.52	289	A0p (Si)	Zhùshǐ (柱史); α^{2} CVn variable
HD 81817				81817	47193	09^{h} 37^{m} 05.35^{s}	+81° 19′ 35.1″	4.28	−3.31	1076	K3III	has a planet
τ Dra	τ	60		181984	94648	19^{h} 15^{m} 33.29^{s}	+73° 21′ 18.8″	4.45	1.14	150	K3III	
ρ Dra	ρ	67		190940	98702	20^{h} 02^{m} 49.05^{s}	+67° 52′ 24.4″	4.51	−0.97	406	K3III	
ψ^{1} Dra A	ψ^{1}	31		162003	86614	17^{h} 41^{m} 56.31^{s}	+72° 08′ 58.2″	4.57	2.85	72	F5IV-V	Dziban, Dsiban; component of the ψ^{1} Dra System
CU Dra	i	10	CU	121130	67627	13^{h} 51^{m} 25.94^{s}	+64° 43′ 23.8″	4.58	−0.82	391	M3III	variable
π Dra	π	58		182564	95081	19^{h} 20^{m} 40.07^{s}	+65° 42′ 51.9″	4.60	0.41	225	A2IIIs	
ο Dra	ο	47		175306	92512	18^{h} 51^{m} 12.01^{s}	+59° 23′ 17.8″	4.63	−0.34	322	K0II-III SB	RS CVn variable
σ Dra	σ	61		185144	96100	19^{h} 32^{m} 20.59^{s}	+69° 39′ 55.4″	4.67	5.87	19	K0V	Alsafi, Athafi; nearby
ω Dra	ω	28		160922	86201	17^{h} 36^{m} 57.09^{s}	+68° 45′ 25.9″	4.77	2.92	76	F5V	
45 Dra	d	45		171635	90905	18^{h} 32^{m} 34.52^{s}	+57° 02′ 44.2″	4.77	−4.96	2885	F7Ib	
42 Dra		42		170693	90344	18^{h} 25^{m} 58.99^{s}	+65° 33′ 48.8″	4.82	−0.12	317	K2III	Fafnir, has a planet (b)
υ Dra	υ	52		176524	92782	18^{h} 54^{m} 23.77^{s}	+71° 17′ 49.5″	4.82	−0.30	344	K0III	Shǎobì (少弼)
18 Dra	g	18		151101	81660	16^{h} 40^{m} 55.12^{s}	+64° 35′ 20.7″	4.84	−1.76	681	K1p	
HD 151613				151613	82020	16^{h} 45^{m} 17.79^{s}	+56° 46′ 54.1″	4.84	2.70	87	F2V	spectroscopic binary
HD 91190				91190	51808	10^{h} 35^{m} 05.59^{s}	+75° 42′ 46.7″	4.86	0.38	257	K0III	
ν^{2} Dra	ν^{2}	25		159560	85829	17^{h} 32^{m} 15.88^{s}	+55° 10′ 22.1″	4.86	2.43	100	Am	Alawaidh, Kuma; component of the ν Dra system
19 Dra	h	19		153597	82860	16^{h} 56^{m} 01.36^{s}	+65° 08′ 04.8″	4.88	3.99	49	F6Vvar	
ν^{1} Dra	ν^{1}	24		159541	85819	17^{h} 32^{m} 10.42^{s}	+55° 11′ 02.8″	4.89	2.48	99	Am...	Kuma; component of the ν Dra system
μ Dra A	μ	21		154905	83608	17^{h} 05^{m} 20.18^{s}	+54° 28′ 11.5″	4.91	2.76	89	F5	Arrakis, Errakis, Al Rakis; double star
HD 175535				175535	92689	18^{h} 53^{m} 13.54^{s}	+50° 42′ 29.8″	4.92	−0.15	337	G8III	
15 Dra	A	15		149212	80650	16^{h} 27^{m} 59.05^{s}	+68° 46′ 05.0″	4.94	−0.95	491	A0III	
6 Dra		6		109551	61384	12^{h} 34^{m} 44.07^{s}	+70° 01′ 18.4″	4.95	−1.17	546	K2III	
CL Dra			CL	143466	78180	15^{h} 57^{m} 47.59^{s}	+54° 44′ 58.2″	4.96	2.31	110	F0IV	δ Sct variable
39 Dra	b	39		170073	90156	18^{h} 23^{m} 54.65^{s}	+58° 48′ 02.1″	4.98	1.17	188	A3V	
36 Dra		36		168151	89348	18^{h} 13^{m} 53.36^{s}	+64° 23′ 49.9″	4.99	3.14	77	F5V	
54 Dra		54		180610	94490	19^{h} 13^{m} 55.16^{s}	+57° 42′ 18.9″	5.00	1.52	162	K2III	
CQ Dra		4	CQ	108907	60998	12^{h} 30^{m} 06.76^{s}	+69° 12′ 04.5″	5.01	−1.25	581	M3IIIa	cataclysmic variable
30 Dra		30		162579	87212	17^{h} 49^{m} 04.33^{s}	+50° 46′ 50.0″	5.02	0.90	217	A2V	
35 Dra		35		163989	87234	17^{h} 49^{m} 26.94^{s}	+76° 57′ 44.2″	5.02	2.49	105	F6IV-Vs	
				169305	89981	18^{h} 21^{m} 32.68^{s}	+49° 07′ 17.3″	5.02	−1.80	755	M2III	
46 Dra	c	46		173524	91755	18^{h} 42^{m} 37.96^{s}	+55° 32′ 21.8″	5.03	−0.21	364	B9.5p...	
17 Dra		17		150117	81292	16^{h} 36^{m} 13.73^{s}	+52° 55′ 27.7″	5.07	−0.36	397	B9V	
27 Dra	f	27		159966	85805	17^{h} 31^{m} 57.89^{s}	+68° 08′ 04.9″	5.07	0.95	217	K0III	
59 Dra		59		180777	94083	19^{h} 09^{m} 09.75^{s}	+76° 33′ 38.9″	5.11	2.93	89	A9V	
53 Dra		53		180006	94302	19^{h} 11^{m} 40.52^{s}	+56° 51′ 32.7″	5.13	0.03	341	G8III	
AF Dra		73	AF	196502	101260	20^{h} 31^{m} 30.40^{s}	+74° 57′ 16.8″	5.18	−0.35	417	A0p...	α^{2} CVn variable
2 Dra		2		100696	56583	11^{h} 36^{m} 02.62^{s}	+69° 19′ 23.7″	5.19	0.84	242	K0III	
				141653	77277	15^{h} 46^{m} 39.95^{s}	+62° 35′ 58.9″	5.19	0.59	272	A2IV	
64 Dra	e	64		190544	98583	20^{h} 01^{m} 28.53^{s}	+64° 49′ 15.6″	5.22	−0.97	564	M1III	
8 Dra		8	IR	112429	63076	12^{h} 55^{m} 28.56^{s}	+65° 26′ 18.8″	5.23	2.93	94	A5n	Taiyi; IR Dra; γ Doradus variable
26 Dra		26		160269	86036	17^{h} 34^{m} 59.25^{s}	+61° 52′ 33.0″	5.23	4.49	46	G0V	
				174980	92056	18^{h} 45^{m} 46.76^{s}	+74° 05′ 07.3″	5.25	0.19	335	K0II-III	
				148293	80161	16^{h} 21^{m} 48.74^{s}	+69° 06′ 33.9″	5.26	0.48	294	K2III	
				150449	81437	16^{h} 38^{m} 00.46^{s}	+56° 00′ 55.4″	5.28	0.78	259	K1III	
3 Dra		3		101673	57111	11^{h} 42^{m} 28.43^{s}	+66° 44′ 41.3″	5.32	−1.15	643	K3III	
				199437	102599	20^{h} 47^{m} 33.56^{s}	+80° 33′ 08.5″	5.36	−0.09	401	K1III	
9 Dra		9		113092	63432	12^{h} 59^{m} 55.28^{s}	+66° 35′ 50.3″	5.37	−0.87	577	K2III	
AT Dra			AT	147232	79804	16^{h} 17^{m} 15.34^{s}	+59° 45′ 17.9″	5.37	−1.15	657	M4IIIa	
50 Dra		50		175286	92112	18^{h} 46^{m} 22.26^{s}	+75° 26′ 01.7″	5.37	0.52	304	A1Vn	
				171779	91013	18^{h} 33^{m} 56.70^{s}	+52° 21′ 12.6″	5.38	−1.56	795	K0III	
75 Dra		75		196787	100965	20^{h} 28^{m} 14.45^{s}	+81° 25′ 21.6″	5.38	−0.35	456	G9III	
LV Dra			LV	177003	93299	19^{h} 00^{m} 13.67^{s}	+50° 32′ 00.5″	5.39	−1.02	623	B2.5IV	α^{2} CVn variable
51 Dra		51		178207	93713	19^{h} 04^{m} 55.17^{s}	+53° 23′ 47.8″	5.40	0.25	349	A0Vn	
66 Dra		66		191277	98962	20^{h} 05^{m} 32.73^{s}	+61° 59′ 42.9″	5.40	1.77	174	K3III	
7 Dra		7		111335	62423	12^{h} 47^{m} 34.34^{s}	+66° 47′ 25.1″	5.43	−1.46	778	K5III	Tianyi
ψ^{2} Dra	ψ^{2}	34		164613	87728	17^{h} 55^{m} 11.14^{s}	+72° 00′ 18.5″	5.43	−1.30	723	F2.5II-III	
				145454	78893	16^{h} 06^{m} 19.73^{s}	+67° 48′ 35.9″	5.44	0.82	273	A0Vn	
				107193	60044	12^{h} 18^{m} 50.07^{s}	+75° 09′ 38.0″	5.47	0.73	289	A1V	
				131507	72664	14^{h} 51^{m} 26.57^{s}	+59° 17′ 37.1″	5.48	−0.18	442	K4III	
				175225	92549	18^{h} 51^{m} 35.00^{s}	+52° 58′ 28.3″	5.51	3.43	85	G9IVa	
49 Dra		49		177249	93340	19^{h} 00^{m} 43.47^{s}	+55° 39′ 29.9″	5.51	−0.40	495	G5IIbCN...	
16 Dra		16		150100	81290	16^{h} 36^{m} 11.43^{s}	+52° 53′ 59.9″	5.53	0.09	400	B9.5Vn	
				156295	84183	17^{h} 12^{m} 32.56^{s}	+62° 52′ 27.2″	5.54	2.44	136	F0IV	
AC Dra			AC	194258	100261	20^{h} 20^{m} 05.98^{s}	+68° 52′ 48.9″	5.59	−1.01	681	M5III	variable
				176598	92969	18^{h} 56^{m} 25.74^{s}	+65° 15′ 29.4″	5.62	0.70	314	G8III	
				158460	85290	17^{h} 25^{m} 41.36^{s}	+60° 02′ 54.0″	5.65	0.56	340	A1Vn	
				172340	90647	18^{h} 29^{m} 44.96^{s}	+77° 32′ 49.5″	5.65	−0.17	475	K4III	
				148374	80309	16^{h} 23^{m} 47.19^{s}	+61° 41′ 47.0″	5.67	0.16	412	G8III	
48 Dra		48		176408	92997	18^{h} 56^{m} 45.08^{s}	+57° 48′ 54.0″	5.67	0.95	286	K1III	
				157681	84950	17^{h} 21^{m} 45.35^{s}	+53° 25′ 13.5″	5.69	−0.60	591	K5III	
				194298	100357	20^{h} 21^{m} 11.52^{s}	+63° 58′ 48.3″	5.69	−1.07	733	K5III	
68 Dra		68		192455	99500	20^{h} 11^{m} 34.74^{s}	+62° 04′ 42.1″	5.70	2.26	159	F5V	
DE Dra		71	DE	193964	100221	20^{h} 19^{m} 36.70^{s}	+62° 15′ 26.7″	5.71	0.39	378	B9V	spectroscopic binary
HD 106574				106574	59746	12^{h} 15^{m} 08.53^{s}	+70° 12′ 00.3″	5.72	−0.06	468	K2III	has a planet
				137443	75260	15^{h} 22^{m} 38.43^{s}	+63° 20′ 30.0″	5.72	0.39	380	K4III	
				128000	71111	14^{h} 32^{m} 30.93^{s}	+55° 23′ 53.0″	5.74	−0.63	612	K5III	
				138852	75974	15^{h} 30^{m} 55.91^{s}	+64° 12′ 30.6″	5.74	0.79	318	K0III-IV	
41 Dra		41		166866	88136	18^{h} 00^{m} 09.07^{s}	+80° 00′ 13.7″	5.74	2.12	173	K2Vvar	spectroscopic binary
				172728	91315	18^{h} 37^{m} 33.51^{s}	+62° 31′ 35.3″	5.74	0.16	426	A0V	
DQ Dra			DQ	148330	80375	16^{h} 24^{m} 25.33^{s}	+55° 12′ 18.2″	5.75	0.50	366	A2svar...	α^{2} CVn variable
HD 161693				161693	86782	17^{h} 43^{m} 59.17^{s}	+53° 48′ 06.16″	5.76	0.24	457	A0V	Alruba
76 Dra		76		199095	102208	20^{h} 42^{m} 35.10^{s}	+82° 31′ 52.0″	5.75	0.55	358	A0V	
				139493	76376	15^{h} 35^{m} 57.08^{s}	+54° 37′ 50.0″	5.77	1.38	246	A2V	
μ Dra B	μ	21		154906		17^{h} 05^{m} 19.70^{s}	+54° 28′ 13.0″	5.80		89		component of the μ Dra system
				142531	77738	15^{h} 52^{m} 16.58^{s}	+55° 49′ 35.7″	5.81	0.60	359	G8III:	
ψ^{1} Dra B	ψ^{1}	31		162004	86620	17^{h} 41^{m} 58.04^{s}	+72° 09′ 27.3″	5.81	4.07	73	G0V	component of the ψ^{1} Dra system, has a planet
				175824	92822	18^{h} 54^{m} 47.17^{s}	+48° 51′ 35.0″	5.84	2.22	173	F3III	
				119476	66798	13^{h} 41^{m} 29.82^{s}	+64° 49′ 20.8″	5.85	1.69	221	A2V	
				139778	76509	15^{h} 37^{m} 32.04^{s}	+54° 30′ 31.6″	5.85	0.66	355	K1III:	
				141675	77370	15^{h} 47^{m} 37.91^{s}	+55° 22′ 35.8″	5.85	1.34	260	A3m	
				161178	86219	17^{h} 37^{m} 08.84^{s}	+72° 27′ 20.7″	5.87	0.91	321	G9III	
				138265	75696	15^{h} 27^{m} 51.44^{s}	+60° 40′ 12.8″	5.90	−0.41	595	K5III	
				187340	97122	19^{h} 44^{m} 18.40^{s}	+69° 20′ 13.6″	5.90	0.24	442	A2III	
				133388	73507	15^{h} 01^{m} 27.11^{s}	+60° 12′ 15.9″	5.91	0.91	327	A4V	
CX Dra			CX	174237	92133	18^{h} 46^{m} 43.08^{s}	+52° 59′ 16.7″	5.91	−3.21	2173	B2.5V	γ Cas variable; Be star
				182190	95038	19^{h} 20^{m} 16.00^{s}	+57° 38′ 42.4″	5.91	−1.25	881	M1III	
HD 193664				193664	100017	20^{h} 17^{m} 30.63^{s}	+66° 51′ 10.7″	5.91	4.69	57	G3V	
				149650	80991	16^{h} 32^{m} 25.66^{s}	+60° 49′ 24.0″	5.92	0.86	335	A2V	
				144204	78542	16^{h} 02^{m} 05.56^{s}	+52° 54′ 57.6″	5.93	−1.07	819	K5III	
				141472	77272	15^{h} 46^{m} 34.88^{s}	+55° 28′ 28.6″	5.94	−1.58	1042	K3III	
37 Dra		37		168653	89448	18^{h} 15^{m} 17.05^{s}	+68° 45′ 21.5″	5.96	1.26	284	K1III:	
74 Dra		74		196925	101082	20^{h} 29^{m} 27.31^{s}	+81° 05′ 26.7″	5.96	1.96	205	K0III+...	
HD 139357				139357	76311	15^{h} 35^{m} 16.22^{s}	+53° 55′ 19.7″	5.97	0.55	396	K4III:	has a planet (b)
				167042	89047	18^{h} 10^{m} 31.53^{s}	+54° 17′ 09.4″	5.97	2.48	163	K1III	
				137389	75256	15^{h} 22^{m} 37.25^{s}	+62° 02′ 49.8″	5.99	0.24	461	A0sp...	
				113049	63340	12^{h} 58^{m} 47.30^{s}	+75° 28′ 20.9″	6.00	0.17	477	K0III	
				161193	86561	17^{h} 41^{m} 21.81^{s}	+51° 49′ 05.5″	6.00	0.96	332	K0III:	
				172883	91525	18^{h} 39^{m} 52.81^{s}	+52° 11′ 45.7″	6.00	−0.19	563	A0p...	
HD 113337				113337	63584	13^{h} 01^{m} 47.15^{s}	+63° 36′ 36.6″	6.01	3.14	122	F6V	has a planet
				173949	91915	18^{h} 44^{m} 18.27^{s}	+61° 02′ 53.1″	6.02	0.78	364	G7IV	
				153956	83138	16^{h} 59^{m} 21.57^{s}	+56° 41′ 18.6″	6.04	1.24	297	K1III:	
				184102	95167	19^{h} 21^{m} 40.24^{s}	+79° 36′ 10.4″	6.06	1.18	309	A3V	
				184958	95978	19^{h} 31^{m} 00.29^{s}	+70° 59′ 21.3″	6.06	−0.35	623	K2	
				172569	91196	18^{h} 36^{m} 13.25^{s}	+65° 29′ 18.7″	6.07	1.79	234	F0V	
				83727	48017	09^{h} 47^{m} 18.14^{s}	+79° 08′ 12.2″	6.09	0.56	416	F0V:	
				163929	87744	17^{h} 55^{m} 23.62^{s}	+55° 58′ 15.9″	6.09	2.34	184	F0IV	
				127821	70952	14^{h} 30^{m} 46.30^{s}	+63° 11′ 08.7″	6.10	3.59	103	F4IV	
				173398	91606	18^{h} 40^{m} 56.40^{s}	+62° 44′ 57.6″	6.10	0.75	383	K0III	
				154633	83359	17^{h} 02^{m} 15.78^{s}	+64° 36′ 02.4″	6.11	0.89	360	G5V	
40 Dra		40		166865	88127	18^{h} 00^{m} 03.37^{s}	+80° 00′ 01.9″	6.11	2.58	166	K2Vvar	spectroscopic binary
				174481	92269	18^{h} 48^{m} 16.09^{s}	+48° 46′ 02.8″	6.12	2.37	183	A7III	
				159870	85923	17^{h} 33^{m} 31.60^{s}	+57° 33′ 31.4″	6.15	−0.67	755	A5V+...	
				189900	98308	19^{h} 58^{m} 28.74^{s}	+63° 32′ 03.1″	6.15	0.55	430	A3V	
				154391	83289	17^{h} 01^{m} 16.98^{s}	+60° 38′ 55.2″	6.16	0.99	353	K1III	
				172864	90182	18^{h} 24^{m} 09.18^{s}	+83° 10′ 31.6″	6.16	0.03	548	A2V	
				150429	81358	16^{h} 36^{m} 54.99^{s}	+63° 04′ 22.9″	6.17	0.30	487	K5	
				94860	53761	10^{h} 59^{m} 57.02^{s}	+77° 46′ 12.8″	6.18	0.03	553	G9III	
				151199	81840	16^{h} 42^{m} 58.40^{s}	+55° 41′ 23.7″	6.18	1.39	295	A2p...	
				173664	91843	18^{h} 43^{m} 29.01^{s}	+53° 52′ 18.5″	6.18	−1.65	1199	A2IV	
				144542	78632	16^{h} 03^{m} 09.37^{s}	+59° 24′ 38.9″	6.19	−0.97	883	M1III	
				197508	101044	20^{h} 29^{m} 02.82^{s}	+83° 37′ 31.7″	6.19	1.54	277	A4m	
				80930	46410	09^{h} 27^{m} 51.63^{s}	+75° 05′ 53.9″	6.20	0.39	474	A5Vs	
				115612	64774	13^{h} 16^{m} 28.66^{s}	+68° 24′ 28.7″	6.20	0.46	458	B9.5V	
69 Dra		69		190960	98401	19^{h} 59^{m} 36.69^{s}	+76° 28′ 53.5″	6.20	0.17	525	M3III	
				146603	79414	16^{h} 12^{m} 25.38^{s}	+67° 08′ 39.4″	6.21	0.34	486	G8III	
				159330	85692	17^{h} 30^{m} 43.56^{s}	+57° 52′ 36.7″	6.22	−1.53	1156	K2III	
UX Dra			UX	183556	95154	19^{h} 21^{m} 35.53^{s}	+76° 33′ 34.6″	6.22	−2.56	1863	C5II	carbon star; variable
				196142	101134	20^{h} 30^{m} 00.72^{s}	+72° 31′ 54.3″	6.23	−0.37	682	K4III:	
DL Dra			DL	129798	71876	14^{h} 42^{m} 03.16^{s}	+61° 15′ 43.2″	6.24	3.09	139	F2V	δ Sct variable
				175823	92731	18^{h} 53^{m} 46.29^{s}	+57° 29′ 11.7″	6.24	−0.19	631	K5III:	
				191174	98872	20^{h} 04^{m} 44.51^{s}	+63° 53′ 24.4″	6.24	1.77	256	A2II-III	
				83550	47884	09^{h} 45^{m} 30.96^{s}	+78° 08′ 05.0″	6.25	−1.21	1012	K2III	
HD 164428				164428	87293	17^{h} 50^{m} 10.10^{s}	+78° 18′ 23.5″	6.25	−0.93	891	K5	has a planet
ER Dra			ER	127929	71040	14^{h} 31^{m} 42.87^{s}	+60° 13′ 32.1″	6.26	0.73	416	F0III	δ Sct variable
				173920	91985	18^{h} 44^{m} 55.39^{s}	+54° 53′ 49.9″	6.26	−1.10	967	G5III	
55 Dra		55		179933	94140	19^{h} 09^{m} 45.80^{s}	+65° 58′ 42.4″	6.26	1.29	321	A0V	
				150010	80920	16^{h} 31^{m} 28.30^{s}	+72° 36′ 43.9″	6.27	0.63	438	K2III	
65 Dra		65		190713	98658	20^{h} 02^{m} 20.16^{s}	+64° 38′ 03.8″	6.27	1.21	335	G7III:	
				174205	91811	18^{h} 43^{m} 10.34^{s}	+70° 47′ 34.3″	6.28	−0.08	610	K2	
DK Dra			DK	106677	59796	12^{h} 15^{m} 41.51^{s}	+72° 33′ 04.5″	6.29	0.59	450	K0III +K0III	RS CVn variable
				154099	82880	16^{h} 56^{m} 16.74^{s}	+73° 07′ 40.5″	6.29	1.35	317	F0V	
				155711	84021	17^{h} 10^{m} 30.65^{s}	+52° 24′ 31.6″	6.30	0.73	424	B9V	
				169028	89835	18^{h} 19^{m} 56.10^{s}	+51° 20′ 52.6″	6.30	0.80	410	K1III:	
				184936	96164	19^{h} 33^{m} 10.06^{s}	+60° 09′ 31.2″	6.30	−1.54	1203	K4III	
				108150	60589	12^{h} 25^{m} 06.38^{s}	+63° 48′ 10.0″	6.31	0.31	516	G8III	
				143187	78017	15^{h} 55^{m} 49.66^{s}	+58° 54′ 42.2″	6.31	0.54	465	A0V	
				148880	80710	16^{h} 28^{m} 43.41^{s}	+51° 24′ 27.8″	6.31	0.91	391	G9III	
				166207	88732	18^{h} 06^{m} 53.47^{s}	+50° 49′ 21.4″	6.31	0.94	386	K0III	
				138524	75822	15^{h} 29^{m} 21.13^{s}	+62° 05′ 58.4″	6.32	−0.28	681	K5	
VW Dra			VW	156947	84496	17^{h} 16^{m} 29.45^{s}	+60° 40′ 14.1″	6.32	0.47	482	K1.5IIIb	semiregular variable
				176707	93197	18^{h} 58^{m} 59.40^{s}	+50° 48′ 32.9″	6.32	0.71	432	G8III	
				190252	98333	19^{h} 58^{m} 41.78^{s}	+70° 22′ 00.5″	6.32	0.76	421	G8III	
				191372	98890	20^{h} 04^{m} 53.41^{s}	+68° 01′ 37.9″	6.32	−1.35	1116	M3IIIa	
				108399	60699	12^{h} 26^{m} 24.47^{s}	+71° 55′ 47.6″	6.33	0.95	389	G8III:	
				145674	79125	16^{h} 09^{m} 02.92^{s}	+57° 56′ 16.1″	6.33	0.88	401	A1V	
				160933	86184	17^{h} 36^{m} 40.03^{s}	+69° 34′ 16.5″	6.33	3.19	139	F9V	
				176795	92717	18^{h} 53^{m} 33.20^{s}	+75° 47′ 14.4″	6.33	−0.82	876	A1V	
				105678	59291	12^{h} 09^{m} 47.09^{s}	+74° 39′ 40.9″	6.34	2.05	235	F6IV	
				122909	68537	14^{h} 01^{m} 50.70^{s}	+68° 40′ 43.3″	6.34	0.05	592	K5	
CN Dra			CN	187764	97326	19^{h} 46^{m} 44.66^{s}	+68° 26′ 16.8″	6.34	0.31	525	F0III	δ Sct variable
				169885	90146	18^{h} 23^{m} 47.95^{s}	+53° 18′ 03.1″	6.35	1.26	340	A3m	
				177483	93466	19^{h} 02^{m} 07.04^{s}	+52° 15′ 40.1″	6.35	−0.12	642	G8III:...	
				183611	95576	19^{h} 26^{m} 26.46^{s}	+62° 33′ 25.4″	6.38	−0.22	682	K5III	
				82685	47260	09^{h} 37^{m} 56.29^{s}	+73° 04′ 49.6″	6.39	2.18	227	F2V+...	
				121146	67589	13^{h} 50^{m} 59.40^{s}	+68° 18′ 55.6″	6.39	1.50	310	K2IV	
				147662	79867	16^{h} 18^{m} 09.81^{s}	+68° 33′ 16.0″	6.39	0.09	594	K0	
				164780	87670	17^{h} 54^{m} 26.75^{s}	+75° 10′ 16.4″	6.39	0.56	479	K0	
				169221	89943	18^{h} 21^{m} 07.15^{s}	+49° 43′ 31.5″	6.39	−0.17	668	K1III	
20 Dra		20		153697	82898	16^{h} 56^{m} 25.32^{s}	+65° 02′ 20.6″	6.40	2.27	219	F1V	
				175938	92040	18^{h} 45^{m} 38.06^{s}	+79° 56′ 33.0″	6.40	1.67	288	A8V	
				154319	83114	16^{h} 59^{m} 02.57^{s}	+69° 11′ 10.9″	6.41	1.71	284	K0	
				145694	79164	16^{h} 09^{m} 26.01^{s}	+55° 49′ 44.1″	6.43	0.79	438	K0	
				170811	90476	18^{h} 27^{m} 42.09^{s}	+59° 32′ 56.5″	6.43	1.18	365	K0IV	
				112826	63297	12^{h} 58^{m} 18.87^{s}	+64° 55′ 31.8″	6.44	−0.59	832	K0	
				137928	75587	15^{h} 26^{m} 32.17^{s}	+54° 01′ 13.2″	6.44	1.21	363	A2IV	
				158633	85235	17^{h} 25^{m} 00.90^{s}	+67° 18′ 24.1″	6.44	5.90	42	K0V	
				138338	75788	15^{h} 28^{m} 56.83^{s}	+55° 11′ 41.5″	6.45	1.64	299	A3m	
				140117	76651	15^{h} 39^{m} 09.52^{s}	+57° 55′ 27.9″	6.45	0.78	443	K1III	
				149198	80682	16^{h} 28^{m} 21.17^{s}	+67° 02′ 38.4″	6.45	−0.18	689	M0	
				178208	93733	19^{h} 05^{m} 09.85^{s}	+49° 55′ 23.4″	6.45	0.19	583	K3III	
				82327	47119	09^{h} 36^{m} 06.79^{s}	+74° 19′ 08.0″	6.46	0.78	447	B9V	
				128332	71251	14^{h} 34^{m} 15.70^{s}	+57° 03′ 57.0″	6.46	4.15	95	F7V	
				155328	83857	17^{h} 08^{m} 17.08^{s}	+50° 50′ 32.0″	6.46	−0.17	689	A1V	
HD 158259				158259	85268	17^{h} 25^{m} 24.14^{s}	+52° 47′ 26.9″	6.46	4.29	89	G0	has five planets
				176560	93068	18^{h} 57^{m} 28.46^{s}	+58° 13′ 29.7″	6.47	1.14	380	A2V	
				185394	96297	19^{h} 34^{m} 46.34^{s}	+63° 26′ 03.0″	6.47	0.38	539	K2	
				91075	51883	10^{h} 36^{m} 02.02^{s}	+80° 29′ 40.7″	6.48	0.89	428	G4III:	
				100858	56716	11^{h} 37^{m} 42.31^{s}	+77° 35′ 44.5″	6.49	−2.09	1698	K5	
				158485	85317	17^{h} 26^{m} 04.85^{s}	+58° 39′ 06.7″	6.49	1.30	356	A4V	
				186340	96771	19^{h} 40^{m} 13.19^{s}	+60° 30′ 25.7″	6.49	1.09	391	A5V	
				167387	89104	18^{h} 11^{m} 07.16^{s}	+60° 24′ 34.3″	6.50	0.76	459	A1Vnn	
				176668	93053	18^{h} 57^{m} 17.34^{s}	+62° 23′ 48.7″	6.50	1.65	305	G5IV comp	
				184146	94604	19^{h} 15^{m} 07.91^{s}	+83° 27′ 45.8″	6.50	0.61	492	A3V	
17 Dra		17		150118		16^{h} 36^{m} 14.10^{s}	+52° 55′ 27.0″	6.53				
29 Dra		29		160538	85852	17^{h} 32^{m} 41.35^{s}	+74° 13′ 38.2″	6.61	1.54	337	K0III	
RY Dra			RY	112559	63152	12^{h} 56^{m} 25.89^{s}	+65° 59′ 39.9″	6.63	−1.81	1590	C7I	carbon star; variable, V_{max} = 6.5^{m}, V_{min} = 8.0^{m}, P = 172 d
HD 143105				143105	77838	15^{h} 53^{m} 37.0^{s}	+68° 43′ 12″	6.75		159	F5	has a planet
38 Dra		38		169027	89594	18^{h} 16^{m} 58.77^{s}	+68° 44′ 30.1″	6.79	0.28	655	A0	
HD 97619				97619	55048	11^{h} 16^{m} 08.9^{s}	+78° 18′ 32″	6.88		695	K0 E	has a planet
205 Dra		205		174343	92204	18^{h} 47^{m} 29.57^{s}	+49° 25′ 55.4″	7.19	0.28	787	F5	
BY Dra			BY	234677	91009	18^{h} 33^{m} 55.77^{s}	+51° 43′ 08.9″	8.07	5.66	54	K6Ve	prototype of the BY Dra variables
HD 156279				156279	84171	17^{h} 12^{m} 23^{s}	+63° 21′ 08″	8.08		119	K0	has a planet
HD 163607				163607	87601	17^{h} 53^{m} 40^{s}	+56° 23′ 31″	8.15		225	G5IV	has two planets (b & c)
HIP 91258					91258	18^{h} 36^{m} 53.0^{s}	+61° 42′ 09″	8.65		146	G5V	has a planet (b)
R Dra			R	149880	81014	16^{h} 32^{m} 40.23^{s}	+66° 45′ 17.9″	8.67	−1.42	1042	M6e	Mira variable; V_{max} = 6.7^{m}, V_{min} = 13.2^{m}, P = 245.5 d
HD 109246				109246	61177	12^{h} 32^{m} 07.19^{s}	+74° 29′ 22.4″	8.77	4.69	214	G0V	Funi; has a planet
HD 147379				147379	79755	16^{h} 16^{m} 43.0^{s}	+67° 14′ 20″	8.90		35	M1V	has a planet
HD 173739				173739	91768	18^{h} 42^{m} 46.7^{s}	+59° 37′ 49″	8.94	11.20	11.5	M3V	component of Struve 2398, 15th nearest star system; flare star
HD 176693				176693		18^{h} 59^{m} 09.0^{s}	+48° 25′ 23″	9.0		290.3 (± 0.85)		Kepler-408, has a transiting planet
HD 191939				191939	99175	20^{h} 08^{m} 06.0^{s}	+66° 51′ 01″	9.0		175	G8V	has three planets
TOI-1136						12^{h} 48^{m} 44.37^{s}	+64° 51′ 19.1″	9.53		276	G5	has at least six transiting planets
HD 173740				173740	91772	18^{h} 42^{m} 46.9^{s}	+59° 37′ 36″	9.70	11.96	11.5	M3.5V	component of Struve 2398; flare star
Kepler-10						19^{h} 02^{m} 43.06^{s}	+50° 14′ 28.7″	10.96	4.77	564	G	has two transiting planets (b and c)
GSC 03549-02811						19^{h} 07^{m} 14.04^{s}	+49° 18′ 59.1″	11.41	4.70	718	G0V	has the transiting planet TrES-2
HD 238914				238914	91388	18^{h} 38^{m} 20.0^{s}	+59° 15′ 14″	12.00		1924	K7	has the planet
WASP-150						17^{h} 37^{m} 03.0^{s}	+53° 01′ 16″	12.00		1748		has a transiting planet
T Dra			T		87820	17^{h} 56^{m} 23.31^{s}	+58° 13′ 06.2″	12.48	6.27	568	Nev	Mira variable; V_{max} = 7.2^{m}, V_{min} = 13.5^{m}, P = 421.2 d
Kepler-447						19^{h} 01^{m} 04.0^{s}	+48° 33′ 36″	12.5		881 (±6)		has a transiting planet (b)
Kepler-4						19^{h} 02^{m} 27.68^{s}	+50° 08′ 08.7″	12.7	4.2	1631	G0	has a transiting planet (b)
HAT-P-37						18^{h} 57^{m} 11^{s}	+51° 16′ 09″	13.23		1341		has a transiting planet
Kepler-1651 A						18^{h} 54^{m} 30.78^{s}	48° 23′ 26.91″	13.86		216.5	M	Has one transiting exoplanet (b)
Kepler-90						18^{h} 57^{m} 44.0^{s}	+49° 18′ 19″	14.0		2790		has eight transiting planets (e, f, g, h & i)
V571 Dra						18^{h} 35^{m} 58.79^{s}	+53° 10′ 28.9″	14.58		7000		binary star system
GD 356						16^{h} 40^{m} 57.16^{s}	+53° 41′ 09.6″	15.39	13.43	65		White dwarf with emission lines
Kepler-52						19^{h} 06^{m} 57.0^{s}	+49° 58′ 33″	15.5		1058.5 (± 8)		has three transiting planets
Kepler-441						18^{h} 58^{m} 16.0^{s}	+49° 00′ 46″	15.5		926		has a transiting planet
Kepler-1651 B						18^{h} 54^{m} 31.18^{s}	48° 23′ 26.31″	16.26		216	M	
LP 71-82						18^{h} 02^{m} 16.60^{s}	64° 15′ 44.6″			27.69	M5.0V	
Table legend: • Name = Proper name • B = Bayer designation • F or/and G. = Flamsteed designation or Gould designation • Var = Variable-star designation • HD = Henry Draper Catalogue designation number • HIP = Hipparcos Catalogue designation number • RA = Right ascension for the Epoch/Equinox J2000.0 • Dec = Declination for the Epoch/Equinox J2000.0 • vis. mag. = visual magnitude (m or m_{v}), also known as apparent magnitude • abs. mag. = absolute magnitude (M_{v}) • Dist. (ly) = Distance in light-years from Earth • Sp. class = Spectral class of the star in the stellar classification system • Notes = Common name(s) or alternate name(s); comments; notable properties [for example: multiple star status, range of variability if it is a variable star, exoplanets, etc.]

== See also ==
- List of stars by constellation

== Bibliography ==
- ESA (1997). "The Hipparcos and Tycho Catalogues".
- Kostjuk, N. D. (2002). "HD-DM-GC-HR-HIP-Bayer-Flamsteed Cross Index".
- Roman, N. G. (1987). "Identification of a Constellation from a Position".
- "SIMBAD Astronomical Database". Centre de Données astronomiques de Strasbourg.
- "Naming Stars".
