= Draco in Chinese astronomy =

The modern constellation Draco lies across one of the quadrants symbolized by the Black Tortoise of the North (北方玄武, Běi Fāng Xuán Wǔ), and Three Enclosures (三垣, Sān Yuán), that divide the sky in traditional Chinese uranography.

The name of the western constellation in modern Chinese is 天龍座 (tiān lóng zuò), meaning "the heaven dragon constellation".

== Stars ==
The map of Chinese constellation in constellation Draco area consists of :

Four Symbols	Mansion (Chinese name)	Romanization	Translation	Asterisms (Chinese name)	Romanization	Translation	Western star name	Proper Name	Chinese star name	Romanization	Translation
Three Enclosures (三垣)	紫微垣	Zǐ Wēi Yuán	Purple Forbidden enclosure								
Three Enclosures (三垣)	紫微垣	Zǐ Wēi Yuán	Purple Forbidden enclosure	四輔	Sìfǔ	Four Advisors	HD 81817		四輔增一	Sìfǔzēngyǐ	1st additional star
Three Enclosures (三垣)	紫微垣	Zǐ Wēi Yuán	Purple Forbidden enclosure	天乙	Tiānyǐ	Celestial Great One	10 Dra		天乙	Tiānyǐ	(One star of)
Three Enclosures (三垣)	紫微垣	Zǐ Wēi Yuán	Purple Forbidden enclosure	太乙	Tàiyǐ	First Great One	HD 119476		太乙	Tàiyǐ	(One star of)
Three Enclosures (三垣)	紫微垣	Zǐ Wēi Yuán	Purple Forbidden enclosure	紫微左垣	Zǐwēizuǒyuán	Left Wall					
Three Enclosures (三垣)	紫微垣	Zǐ Wēi Yuán	Purple Forbidden enclosure	紫微左垣	Zǐwēizuǒyuán	Left Wall	ι Dra	Edasich			
Three Enclosures (三垣)	紫微垣	Zǐ Wēi Yuán	Purple Forbidden enclosure	紫微左垣	Zǐwēizuǒyuán	Left Wall	ι Dra	Edasich	紫微左垣一	Zǐwēizuǒyuányī	1st star
Three Enclosures (三垣)	紫微垣	Zǐ Wēi Yuán	Purple Forbidden enclosure	紫微左垣	Zǐwēizuǒyuán	Left Wall	ι Dra	Edasich	左樞	Zuǒshū	The Left Pivot
Three Enclosures (三垣)	紫微垣	Zǐ Wēi Yuán	Purple Forbidden enclosure	紫微左垣	Zǐwēizuǒyuán	Left Wall	θ Dra				
Three Enclosures (三垣)	紫微垣	Zǐ Wēi Yuán	Purple Forbidden enclosure	紫微左垣	Zǐwēizuǒyuán	Left Wall	θ Dra		紫微左垣二	Zǐwēizuǒyuánèr	2nd star
Three Enclosures (三垣)	紫微垣	Zǐ Wēi Yuán	Purple Forbidden enclosure	紫微左垣	Zǐwēizuǒyuán	Left Wall	θ Dra		上宰	Shǎngzǎi	The First Premier
Three Enclosures (三垣)	紫微垣	Zǐ Wēi Yuán	Purple Forbidden enclosure	紫微左垣	Zǐwēizuǒyuán	Left Wall	η Dra	Athebyne (for component A)			
Three Enclosures (三垣)	紫微垣	Zǐ Wēi Yuán	Purple Forbidden enclosure	紫微左垣	Zǐwēizuǒyuán	Left Wall	η Dra	Athebyne (for component A)	紫微左垣三	Zǐwēizuǒyuánsān	3rd star
Three Enclosures (三垣)	紫微垣	Zǐ Wēi Yuán	Purple Forbidden enclosure	紫微左垣	Zǐwēizuǒyuán	Left Wall	η Dra	Athebyne (for component A)	少宰	Shǎozǎi	The Second Premier
Three Enclosures (三垣)	紫微垣	Zǐ Wēi Yuán	Purple Forbidden enclosure	紫微左垣	Zǐwēizuǒyuán	Left Wall	ζ Dra	Aldhibah (for component A)			
Three Enclosures (三垣)	紫微垣	Zǐ Wēi Yuán	Purple Forbidden enclosure	紫微左垣	Zǐwēizuǒyuán	Left Wall	ζ Dra	Aldhibah (for component A)	紫微左垣四	Zǐwēizuǒyuánsì	4th star
Three Enclosures (三垣)	紫微垣	Zǐ Wēi Yuán	Purple Forbidden enclosure	紫微左垣	Zǐwēizuǒyuán	Left Wall	ζ Dra	Aldhibah (for component A)	上弼	Shǎngbì	The First Minister
Three Enclosures (三垣)	紫微垣	Zǐ Wēi Yuán	Purple Forbidden enclosure	紫微左垣	Zǐwēizuǒyuán	Left Wall	υ Dra				
Three Enclosures (三垣)	紫微垣	Zǐ Wēi Yuán	Purple Forbidden enclosure	紫微左垣	Zǐwēizuǒyuán	Left Wall	υ Dra		紫微左垣五	Zǐwēizuǒyuánwu	5th star
Three Enclosures (三垣)	紫微垣	Zǐ Wēi Yuán	Purple Forbidden enclosure	紫微左垣	Zǐwēizuǒyuán	Left Wall	υ Dra		少弼	Shǎobì	The Second Minister
Three Enclosures (三垣)	紫微垣	Zǐ Wēi Yuán	Purple Forbidden enclosure	紫微左垣	Zǐwēizuǒyuán	Left Wall	73 Dra				
Three Enclosures (三垣)	紫微垣	Zǐ Wēi Yuán	Purple Forbidden enclosure	紫微左垣	Zǐwēizuǒyuán	Left Wall	73 Dra		紫微左垣六	Zǐwēizuǒyuánliù	6th star
Three Enclosures (三垣)	紫微垣	Zǐ Wēi Yuán	Purple Forbidden enclosure	紫微左垣	Zǐwēizuǒyuán	Left Wall	73 Dra		上衛	Shǎngwèi	The First Imperial Guard
Three Enclosures (三垣)	紫微垣	Zǐ Wēi Yuán	Purple Forbidden enclosure	紫微右垣	Zǐwēiyòuyuán	Right Wall					
Three Enclosures (三垣)	紫微垣	Zǐ Wēi Yuán	Purple Forbidden enclosure	紫微右垣	Zǐwēiyòuyuán	Right Wall	α Dra	Thuban			
Three Enclosures (三垣)	紫微垣	Zǐ Wēi Yuán	Purple Forbidden enclosure	紫微右垣	Zǐwēiyòuyuán	Right Wall	α Dra	Thuban	紫微右垣一	Zǐwēiyòuyuányī	1st star
Three Enclosures (三垣)	紫微垣	Zǐ Wēi Yuán	Purple Forbidden enclosure	紫微右垣	Zǐwēiyòuyuán	Right Wall	α Dra	Thuban	右樞	Yòushū	The Right Pivot
Three Enclosures (三垣)	紫微垣	Zǐ Wēi Yuán	Purple Forbidden enclosure	紫微右垣	Zǐwēiyòuyuán	Right Wall	κ Dra				
Three Enclosures (三垣)	紫微垣	Zǐ Wēi Yuán	Purple Forbidden enclosure	紫微右垣	Zǐwēiyòuyuán	Right Wall	κ Dra		紫微右垣二	Zǐwēiyòuyuánèr	2nd star
Three Enclosures (三垣)	紫微垣	Zǐ Wēi Yuán	Purple Forbidden enclosure	紫微右垣	Zǐwēiyòuyuán	Right Wall	κ Dra		少尉	Shǎowèi	The Second Chief Judge
Three Enclosures (三垣)	紫微垣	Zǐ Wēi Yuán	Purple Forbidden enclosure	紫微右垣	Zǐwēiyòuyuán	Right Wall	λ Dra	Giausar			
Three Enclosures (三垣)	紫微垣	Zǐ Wēi Yuán	Purple Forbidden enclosure	紫微右垣	Zǐwēiyòuyuán	Right Wall	λ Dra	Giausar	紫微右垣三	Zǐwēiyòuyuánsān	3rd star
Three Enclosures (三垣)	紫微垣	Zǐ Wēi Yuán	Purple Forbidden enclosure	紫微右垣	Zǐwēiyòuyuán	Right Wall	λ Dra	Giausar	上輔	Shǎngfǔ	The First Minister
Three Enclosures (三垣)	紫微垣	Zǐ Wēi Yuán	Purple Forbidden enclosure	紫微右垣	Zǐwēiyòuyuán	Right Wall	6 Dra		少尉增一	Shǎowèizēngyī	1st additional star of The Second Chief Judge
Three Enclosures (三垣)	紫微垣	Zǐ Wēi Yuán	Purple Forbidden enclosure	紫微右垣	Zǐwēiyòuyuán	Right Wall	4 Dra		少尉增二	Shǎowèizēngèr	2nd additional star of The Second Chief Judge
Three Enclosures (三垣)	紫微垣	Zǐ Wēi Yuán	Purple Forbidden enclosure	紫微右垣	Zǐwēiyòuyuán	Right Wall	2 Dra		上輔增一	Shǎngfǔzēngyī	1st additional star of The First Minister
Three Enclosures (三垣)	紫微垣	Zǐ Wēi Yuán	Purple Forbidden enclosure	紫微右垣	Zǐwēiyòuyuán	Right Wall	3 Dra		上輔增二	Shǎngfǔzēngèr	2nd additional star of The First Minister
Three Enclosures (三垣)	紫微垣	Zǐ Wēi Yuán	Purple Forbidden enclosure	陰德	Yīndé	Hidden Virtue					
Three Enclosures (三垣)	紫微垣	Zǐ Wēi Yuán	Purple Forbidden enclosure	陰德	Yīndé	Hidden Virtue	HD 91190		陰德一	Yīndéyī	1st star
Three Enclosures (三垣)	紫微垣	Zǐ Wēi Yuán	Purple Forbidden enclosure	陰德	Yīndé	Hidden Virtue	HD 91114		陰德二	Yīndéèr	2nd star
Three Enclosures (三垣)	紫微垣	Zǐ Wēi Yuán	Purple Forbidden enclosure	尚書	Shàngshū	Royal Secretary					
Three Enclosures (三垣)	紫微垣	Zǐ Wēi Yuán	Purple Forbidden enclosure	尚書	Shàngshū	Royal Secretary	ω Dra		尚書一	Shàngshūyī	1st star
Three Enclosures (三垣)	紫微垣	Zǐ Wēi Yuán	Purple Forbidden enclosure	尚書	Shàngshū	Royal Secretary	15 Dra		尚書二	Shàngshūèr	2nd star
Three Enclosures (三垣)	紫微垣	Zǐ Wēi Yuán	Purple Forbidden enclosure	尚書	Shàngshū	Royal Secretary	18 Dra		尚書三	Shàngshūsān	3rd star
Three Enclosures (三垣)	紫微垣	Zǐ Wēi Yuán	Purple Forbidden enclosure	尚書	Shàngshū	Royal Secretary	HD 148293		尚書四	Shàngshūsì	4th star
Three Enclosures (三垣)	紫微垣	Zǐ Wēi Yuán	Purple Forbidden enclosure	尚書	Shàngshū	Royal Secretary	19 Dra		尚書五	Shàngshūwu	5th star
Three Enclosures (三垣)	紫微垣	Zǐ Wēi Yuán	Purple Forbidden enclosure	尚書	Shàngshū	Royal Secretary	20 Dra		尚書增二	Shàngshūzēngèr	2nd additional star
Three Enclosures (三垣)	紫微垣	Zǐ Wēi Yuán	Purple Forbidden enclosure	女史	Nǚshǐ	Female Protocol	ψ Dra	Dziban (for ψ1 Dra A)	女史	Nǚshǐ	(One star of)
Three Enclosures (三垣)	紫微垣	Zǐ Wēi Yuán	Purple Forbidden enclosure	柱史	Zhùshǐ	Official of Royal Archives					
Three Enclosures (三垣)	紫微垣	Zǐ Wēi Yuán	Purple Forbidden enclosure	柱史	Zhùshǐ	Official of Royal Archives	φ Dra		柱史	Zhùshǐ	(One star of)
Three Enclosures (三垣)	紫微垣	Zǐ Wēi Yuán	Purple Forbidden enclosure	柱史	Zhùshǐ	Official of Royal Archives	38 Dra		柱史增一	Zhùshǐzēngyī	1st additional star
Three Enclosures (三垣)	紫微垣	Zǐ Wēi Yuán	Purple Forbidden enclosure	柱史	Zhùshǐ	Official of Royal Archives	37 Dra		柱史增二	Zhùshǐzēngèr	2nd additional star
Three Enclosures (三垣)	紫微垣	Zǐ Wēi Yuán	Purple Forbidden enclosure	御女	Yùnǚ	Maids-in-Waiting					
Three Enclosures (三垣)	紫微垣	Zǐ Wēi Yuán	Purple Forbidden enclosure	御女	Yùnǚ	Maids-in-Waiting	τ Dra		御女一	Yùnǚyī	1st star
Three Enclosures (三垣)	紫微垣	Zǐ Wēi Yuán	Purple Forbidden enclosure	御女	Yùnǚ	Maids-in-Waiting	50 Dra		御女二	Yùnǚèr	2nd star
Three Enclosures (三垣)	紫微垣	Zǐ Wēi Yuán	Purple Forbidden enclosure	御女	Yùnǚ	Maids-in-Waiting	29 Dra		御女三	Yùnǚsān	3rd star
Three Enclosures (三垣)	紫微垣	Zǐ Wēi Yuán	Purple Forbidden enclosure	御女	Yùnǚ	Maids-in-Waiting	χ Dra		御女四	Yùnǚsì	4th star
Three Enclosures (三垣)	紫微垣	Zǐ Wēi Yuán	Purple Forbidden enclosure	天柱	Tiānzhù	Celestial Pillars					
Three Enclosures (三垣)	紫微垣	Zǐ Wēi Yuán	Purple Forbidden enclosure	天柱	Tiānzhù	Celestial Pillars	76 Dra		御女一	Tiānzhùyī	1st star
Three Enclosures (三垣)	紫微垣	Zǐ Wēi Yuán	Purple Forbidden enclosure	天柱	Tiānzhù	Celestial Pillars	69 Dra		御女三	Tiānzhùsān	3rd star
Three Enclosures (三垣)	紫微垣	Zǐ Wēi Yuán	Purple Forbidden enclosure	天柱	Tiānzhù	Celestial Pillars	59 Dra		御女四	Tiānzhùsì	4th star
Three Enclosures (三垣)	紫微垣	Zǐ Wēi Yuán	Purple Forbidden enclosure	天柱	Tiānzhù	Celestial Pillars	40 Dra		御女五	Tiānzhùwǔ	5th star
Three Enclosures (三垣)	紫微垣	Zǐ Wēi Yuán	Purple Forbidden enclosure	天柱	Tiānzhù	Celestial Pillars	59 Dra		天柱增一	Tiānzhùzēngyī	1st additional star
Three Enclosures (三垣)	紫微垣	Zǐ Wēi Yuán	Purple Forbidden enclosure	天柱	Tiānzhù	Celestial Pillars	74 Dra		御女增三	Tiānzhùzēngsān	3rd additional star
Three Enclosures (三垣)	紫微垣	Zǐ Wēi Yuán	Purple Forbidden enclosure	天柱	Tiānzhù	Celestial Pillars	75 Dra		御女增四	Tiānzhùzēngsì	4th additional star
Three Enclosures (三垣)	紫微垣	Zǐ Wēi Yuán	Purple Forbidden enclosure	天柱	Tiānzhù	Celestial Pillars	41 Dra		御女增五	Tiānzhùzēngwǔ	5th additional star
Three Enclosures (三垣)	紫微垣	Zǐ Wēi Yuán	Purple Forbidden enclosure	天柱	Tiānzhù	Celestial Pillars	35 Dra		御女增六	Tiānzhùzēngliù	6th additional star
Three Enclosures (三垣)	紫微垣	Zǐ Wēi Yuán	Purple Forbidden enclosure	天廚	Tiānchú	Celestial Kitchen					
Three Enclosures (三垣)	紫微垣	Zǐ Wēi Yuán	Purple Forbidden enclosure	天廚	Tiānchú	Celestial Kitchen	δ Dra	Altais	天廚一	Tiānchúyī	1st star
Three Enclosures (三垣)	紫微垣	Zǐ Wēi Yuán	Purple Forbidden enclosure	天廚	Tiānchú	Celestial Kitchen	σ Dra	Alsafi	天廚二	Tiānchúèr	2nd star
Three Enclosures (三垣)	紫微垣	Zǐ Wēi Yuán	Purple Forbidden enclosure	天廚	Tiānchú	Celestial Kitchen	ε Dra		天廚三	Tiānchúsān	3rd star
Three Enclosures (三垣)	紫微垣	Zǐ Wēi Yuán	Purple Forbidden enclosure	天廚	Tiānchú	Celestial Kitchen	ρ Dra		天廚四	Tiānchúsì	4th star
Three Enclosures (三垣)	紫微垣	Zǐ Wēi Yuán	Purple Forbidden enclosure	天廚	Tiānchú	Celestial Kitchen	64 Dra		天廚五	Tiānchúwu	5th star
Three Enclosures (三垣)	紫微垣	Zǐ Wēi Yuán	Purple Forbidden enclosure	天廚	Tiānchú	Celestial Kitchen	π Dra		天廚六	Tiānchúliù	6th star
Three Enclosures (三垣)	紫微垣	Zǐ Wēi Yuán	Purple Forbidden enclosure	天廚	Tiānchú	Celestial Kitchen	55 Dra		天廚增一	Tiānchúzēngyī	1st additional star
Three Enclosures (三垣)	紫微垣	Zǐ Wēi Yuán	Purple Forbidden enclosure	天廚	Tiānchú	Celestial Kitchen	65 Dra		天廚增二	Tiānchúzēngèr	2nd additional star
Three Enclosures (三垣)	紫微垣	Zǐ Wēi Yuán	Purple Forbidden enclosure	天棓	Tiānbàng	Celestial Flail					
Three Enclosures (三垣)	紫微垣	Zǐ Wēi Yuán	Purple Forbidden enclosure	天棓	Tiānbàng	Celestial Flail	ξ Dra	Grumium (for component A)	天棓一	Tiānbàngyī	1st star
Three Enclosures (三垣)	紫微垣	Zǐ Wēi Yuán	Purple Forbidden enclosure	天棓	Tiānbàng	Celestial Flail	ν^{2} Dra	Alawaidh	天棓二	Tiānbàngèr	2nd star
Three Enclosures (三垣)	紫微垣	Zǐ Wēi Yuán	Purple Forbidden enclosure	天棓	Tiānbàng	Celestial Flail	β Dra	Rastaban (for component A)			
Three Enclosures (三垣)	紫微垣	Zǐ Wēi Yuán	Purple Forbidden enclosure	天棓	Tiānbàng	Celestial Flail	β Dra	Rastaban (for component A)	天棓三	Tiānbàngsān	3rd star
Three Enclosures (三垣)	紫微垣	Zǐ Wēi Yuán	Purple Forbidden enclosure	天棓	Tiānbàng	Celestial Flail	β Dra	Rastaban (for component A)	天棓西南星	Tiānbàngxīnánxīng	Northwestern star
Three Enclosures (三垣)	紫微垣	Zǐ Wēi Yuán	Purple Forbidden enclosure	天棓	Tiānbàng	Celestial Flail	β Dra	Rastaban (for component A)	中台西北星	Zhōngtāixīběixīng	Star of the celestial body in the northwest
Three Enclosures (三垣)	紫微垣	Zǐ Wēi Yuán	Purple Forbidden enclosure	天棓	Tiānbàng	Celestial Flail	γ Dra	Eltanin			
Three Enclosures (三垣)	紫微垣	Zǐ Wēi Yuán	Purple Forbidden enclosure	天棓	Tiānbàng	Celestial Flail	γ Dra	Eltanin	天棓四	Tiānbàngsì	4th star
Three Enclosures (三垣)	紫微垣	Zǐ Wēi Yuán	Purple Forbidden enclosure	天棓	Tiānbàng	Celestial Flail	γ Dra	Eltanin	天棓东中星	Tiānbàngdōngzhōngxīng	Northern and center star
Three Enclosures (三垣)	紫微垣	Zǐ Wēi Yuán	Purple Forbidden enclosure	天棓	Tiānbàng	Celestial Flail	ν^{1} Dra		天棓增一	Tiānbàngzēngyī	1st additional star
Three Enclosures (三垣)	紫微垣	Zǐ Wēi Yuán	Purple Forbidden enclosure	天棓	Tiānbàng	Celestial Flail	30 Dra		天棓增二	Tiānbàngzēngèr	2nd additional star
Three Enclosures (三垣)	紫微垣	Zǐ Wēi Yuán	Purple Forbidden enclosure	天棓	Tiānbàng	Celestial Flail	μ Dra	Alrakis (for component A)	天棓增九	Tiānbàngzēngjiǔ	9th additional star
Three Enclosures (三垣)	紫微垣	Zǐ Wēi Yuán	Purple Forbidden enclosure	天棓	Tiānbàng	Celestial Flail	26 Dra		天棓增十	Tiānbàngzēngshí	10th additional star
Three Enclosures (三垣)	紫微垣	Zǐ Wēi Yuán	Purple Forbidden enclosure	內廚	Nèichú	Inner Kitchen					
Three Enclosures (三垣)	紫微垣	Zǐ Wēi Yuán	Purple Forbidden enclosure	內廚	Nèichú	Inner Kitchen	7 Dra	Tianyi	內廚一	Nèichúyī	1st star
Three Enclosures (三垣)	紫微垣	Zǐ Wēi Yuán	Purple Forbidden enclosure	內廚	Nèichú	Inner Kitchen	8 Dra	Taiyi	內廚二	Nèichúèr	2nd star
Three Enclosures (三垣)	紫微垣	Zǐ Wēi Yuán	Purple Forbidden enclosure	內廚	Nèichú	Inner Kitchen	9 Dra		內廚增一	Nèichúzēngèr	2nd additional star
Three Enclosures (三垣)	紫微垣	Zǐ Wēi Yuán	Purple Forbidden enclosure	天床	Tiānchuáng	Celestial Bed					
Three Enclosures (三垣)	紫微垣	Zǐ Wēi Yuán	Purple Forbidden enclosure	天床	Tiānchuáng	Celestial Bed	HD 141653		天床三	Tiānchuángsān	3rd star
Three Enclosures (三垣)	紫微垣	Zǐ Wēi Yuán	Purple Forbidden enclosure	天床	Tiānchuáng	Celestial Bed	HD 146603		天床四	Tiānchuángsì	4th star
Black Tortoise of the North (北方玄武)	女	Nǚ	Girl	扶筐	Fúkuāng	Basket for Mulberry Leaves					
Black Tortoise of the North (北方玄武)	女	Nǚ	Girl	扶筐	Fúkuāng	Basket for Mulberry Leaves	46 Dra		扶筐一	Fúkuāngyī	1st star
Black Tortoise of the North (北方玄武)	女	Nǚ	Girl	扶筐	Fúkuāng	Basket for Mulberry Leaves	45 Dra		扶筐二	Fúkuāngèr	2nd star
Black Tortoise of the North (北方玄武)	女	Nǚ	Girl	扶筐	Fúkuāng	Basket for Mulberry Leaves	39 Dra		扶筐三	Fúkuāngsān	3rd star
Black Tortoise of the North (北方玄武)	女	Nǚ	Girl	扶筐	Fúkuāng	Basket for Mulberry Leaves	ο Dra		扶筐四	Fúkuāngsì	4th star
Black Tortoise of the North (北方玄武)	女	Nǚ	Girl	扶筐	Fúkuāng	Basket for Mulberry Leaves	48 Dra		扶筐五	Fúkuāngwǔ	5th star
Black Tortoise of the North (北方玄武)	女	Nǚ	Girl	扶筐	Fúkuāng	Basket for Mulberry Leaves	49 Dra		扶筐六	Fúkuāngliù	6th star
Black Tortoise of the North (北方玄武)	女	Nǚ	Girl	扶筐	Fúkuāng	Basket for Mulberry Leaves	51 Dra		扶筐七	Fúkuānqī	7th star
Black Tortoise of the North (北方玄武)	女	Nǚ	Girl	扶筐	Fúkuāng	Basket for Mulberry Leaves	36 Dra		扶筐增一	Fúkuāngzēngyī	1st additional star
Black Tortoise of the North (北方玄武)	女	Nǚ	Girl	扶筐	Fúkuāng	Basket for Mulberry Leaves	42 Dra	Fafnir	扶筐增二	Fúkuāngzēngèr	2nd additional star
Black Tortoise of the North (北方玄武)	女	Nǚ	Girl	扶筐	Fúkuāng	Basket for Mulberry Leaves	54 Dra		扶筐增三	Fúkuāngzēngān	3rd additional star
Black Tortoise of the North (北方玄武)	女	Nǚ	Girl	扶筐	Fúkuāng	Basket for Mulberry Leaves	53 Dra		扶筐增四	Fúkuāngzēngsì	4th additional star
Black Tortoise of the North (北方玄武)	危	Wēi	Rooftop	天鈎	Tiāngōu	Celestial Hook	HD 194298		天鉤二	Tiāngōuèr	2nd star

== See also ==
- Chinese star names
- Chinese constellations
