= Omega Draconis =

Star in the constellation Draco

- Location of ω Draconis (circled in red)

Observation data Epoch J2000 Equinox ICRS
- Constellation: Draco
- Right ascension: 17^{h} 36^{m} 57.09431^{s}
- Declination: +68° 45′ 28.6815″
- Apparent magnitude (V): 4.80

Characteristics
- Evolutionary stage: main sequence
- Spectral type: F5V
- U−B color index: −0.01
- B−V color index: +0.43

Astrometry
Radial velocity (R_{v})	−13.98±0.02 km/s
Proper motion (μ)	RA: +1.690 mas/yr Dec.: +321.452 mas/yr
Parallax (π)	42.0939±0.1425 mas
Distance	77.5 ± 0.3 ly (23.76 ± 0.08 pc)
Absolute magnitude (M_{V})	2.95

Orbit
Period (P)	5.2797766±0.0000044 d
Semi-major axis (a)	3.469±0.017 mas
Eccentricity (e)	0.00220±0.00031
Inclination (i)	151.4±1.1°
Longitude of the node (Ω)	1.23±0.32°
Periastron epoch (T)	JD 2454349.083±0.083
Argument of periastron (ω) (secondary)	314.8±5.6°
Semi-amplitude (K_{1}) (primary)	36.254±0.016 km/s
Semi-amplitude (K_{2}) (secondary)	44.720±0.016 km/s

Details

ω Dra A
Mass	1.46±0.16 M_{☉}
Luminosity	5.61 L_{☉}
Temperature	6,500 K
Metallicity [Fe/H]	0.18±0.05 dex
Age	1.9 Gyr

ω Dra B
Mass	1.18±0.13 M_{☉}
Temperature	5,900 K
Metallicity [Fe/H]	0.0 dex

Other designations
- ω Dra, 28 Dra, BD+68°949, GJ 4017, HD 160922, HIP 86201, HR 6596, SAO 17576

Database references
SIMBAD	data

Omega Draconis, Latinized from ω Draconis and also known as 28 Draconis, is a binary star in the constellation of Draco. The system is fairly close, and is located about 78 light-years (24 parsecs) away, based on its parallax.

Omega Draconis is a spectroscopic binary, which means the two stellar components are too close to be resolved but periodic Doppler shifts in their spectra indicate orbital motion. In this case, light from both stars can be detected, and it is a double-lined spectroscopic binary. The orbital period of the system is 5.28 days, and the eccentricity of the system is 0.00220, implying a nearly circular orbit. The primary has a mass of 1.46 M_{☉}, and is an F-type main-sequence star. The secondary is less massive, at 1.18 M_{☉}.

== Nomenclature ==
With 27 Draconis, it composed the Arabs' الأظفار الذئب al-ʼaẓfār al-dhiʼb, "the hyena's claws" in the asterism of the Mother Camels. The two stars have been distinguished as Adfar Aldib I (ω) and Adfar Aldib II (27 Draconis).

In Chinese, 尚書 (Shàng Shū), meaning Royal Secretary, refers to an asterism consisting of ω Draconis, 15 Draconis, 18 Draconis and 19 Draconis. Consequently, ω Draconis itself is known as 尚書一 (Shàng Shū yī, English: the First Star of Royal Secretary.).
