= Tianyi =

Tianyi may refer to:

- Tianyi Pavilion, Ningbo, the oldest existing library in China
- Tianyi Square, Ningbo
- Tianyi Film Company, one of the biggest film production companies in pre-World War II China
- Tianyi UAV
- Tianyi, the proper name of the star 7 Draconis
- Tianyi bao, A Chinese anarchist publication in Japan
- Luo Tianyi, Chinese vocaloid character
