= Psi Draconis =

The Bayer designation Psi Draconis (ψ Dra / ψ Draconis) is shared by two star systems, in the constellation Draco:

- ψ^{1} Draconis
- ψ^{2} Draconis
