= HD 175535 =

Star in the constellation Draco

- Location of HD 175535 (circled in red)

Observation data Epoch J2000 Equinox ICRS
- Constellation: Draco
- Right ascension: 18^{h} 53^{m} 13.55099^{s}
- Declination: +50° 42′ 29.5940″
- Apparent magnitude (V): 4.92

Characteristics
- Evolutionary stage: red giant branch
- Spectral type: G7 IIIa Fe−1
- U−B color index: 0.57
- B−V color index: 0.90

Astrometry
Radial velocity (R_{v})	+8.5 km/s
Proper motion (μ)	RA: −4.442 mas/yr Dec.: −21.985 mas/yr
Parallax (π)	11.1969±0.4974 mas
Distance	290 ± 10 ly (89 ± 4 pc)
Absolute magnitude (M_{V})	−0.78

Orbit
Period (P)	972.84±0.35 d
Eccentricity (e)	0.342±0.006
Periastron epoch (T)	53,678.2±2.4
Argument of periastron (ω) (secondary)	190.0±1.1°
Semi-amplitude (K_{1}) (primary)	5.83±0.04 km/s

Details
Mass	3.27 M_{☉}
Radius	13 R_{☉}
Luminosity	219 L_{☉}
Surface gravity (log g)	2.85±0.15 cgs
Temperature	5,024±74 K
Metallicity [Fe/H]	−0.07±0.07 dex
Rotational velocity (v sin i)	2.3 km/s
Age	320 Myr

Other designations
- BD+50°2686, HD 175535, HIP 92689, HR 7137, SAO 31241

Database references
SIMBAD	data

HD 175535 is a binary star system in the northern circumpolar constellation of Draco. It has an apparent visual magnitude of 4.92, which is bright enough to be faintly visible to the naked eye. The system is located about 290 light years away, as determined from its annual parallax shift of 11.2 mas. It is moving further from the Earth with a heliocentric radial velocity of +8.5 km/s.

The binary nature of this system was announced by W. W. Campbell of the Lick Observatory in 1911. It is a single-lined spectroscopic binary with an orbital period of 2.66 years (972.84 d) and an eccentricity of 0.342. The a sin i value for the visible component is 73.4±0.6 Gm, where a is the semimajor axis and i is the (unknown) orbital inclination. This indicates that the actual semimajor axis is larger than 0.49 AU.

The visible component appears to be an evolved giant star with a stellar classification of G7 IIIa Fe−1, where the suffix notation indicates an underabundance of iron in the atmosphere. It is 320 million years old with 3.27 times the mass of the Sun and about 13 times the Sun's radius. The star is radiating 219 times the Sun's luminosity from its enlarged photosphere at an effective temperature of 5,024 K.
