= HD 163607 c =

Extrasolar planet

Discovery
- Discovered by: Giguere et al.
- Discovery site: Keck Observatory
- Discovery date: 2011
- Detection method: Doppler spectroscopy

Orbital characteristics
- Semi-major axis: 2.39±0.11 AU
- Eccentricity: 0.080±0.014
- Orbital period (sidereal): 1272.0±4.4 d
- Time of perihelion: 2455111±40 JD
- Argument of perihelion: 274±12 º
- Semi-amplitude: 38.37±0.65 m/s
- Star: HD 163607

Physical characteristics
- Mass: ≥2.201±0.037 M_{J}

HD 163607 c is the outermost planet discovered to orbit a star HD 163607, a star somewhat brighter and older than the Sun. It was discovered using the radial velocity method, and was initially observed as part of the N2K Program. Its minimum mass is at least 2.4 of Jupiter's. It is located in its host star's habitable zone.

== See also ==
- HD 163607 b
