= HD 151613 =

Binary star system in the constellation in the constellation of Draco

- Location of HD 151613 (circled in red)

Observation data Epoch J2000 Equinox ICRS
- Constellation: Draco
- Right ascension: 16^{h} 45^{m} 17.88121^{s}
- Declination: +56° 46′ 54.7985″
- Apparent magnitude (V): 4.84

Characteristics
- Spectral type: F2 V
- B−V color index: 0.375±0.013

Astrometry
Radial velocity (R_{v})	−2.0 km/s
Proper motion (μ)	RA: 24.85 mas/yr Dec.: 67.07 mas/yr
Parallax (π)	39.2932±0.3182 mas
Distance	83.0 ± 0.7 ly (25.4 ± 0.2 pc)
Absolute magnitude (M_{V})	2.71

Orbit
Period (P)	363.57 d
Eccentricity (e)	0.35
Periastron epoch (T)	2415232.4 JD
Argument of periastron (ω) (secondary)	80.7°
Semi-amplitude (K_{1}) (primary)	6.0 km/s

Details
Mass	1.43 M_{☉}
Radius	1.6 R_{☉}
Luminosity	6.91 L_{☉}
Surface gravity (log g)	4.05 cgs
Temperature	6,630 K
Metallicity [Fe/H]	−0.23 dex
Rotational velocity (v sin i)	47.5±2.4 km/s
Age	2.30 Gyr

Other designations
- BD+57°1702, FK5 627, GJ 9578, HD 151613, HIP 82020, HR 6237, SAO 30076, WDS 16453+5647

Database references
SIMBAD	data

HD 151613 is a binary star system in the northern circumpolar constellation of Draco. It is visible to the naked eye with an apparent visual magnitude of 4.84. The distance to this star, as estimated from its annual parallax shift of 39.3 mas, is 83 light years. It is moving closer to the Earth with a heliocentric radial velocity of −2 km/s.

This is a single-lined spectroscopic binary system with an orbital period of 363.57 days and an eccentricity of 0.35. The pair were resolved through speckle interferometry in 1977, showing an angular separation of 0.041″. They were later resolved in 1981 with a separation of 0.047″, but were unresolved during 20 other attempts between 1976–1991. The system is a source of X-ray emission. The visible component is an F-type main-sequence star with a stellar classification of F2 V. It is around 2.3 billion years old with a projected rotational velocity of 48 km/s.
