= 68 Draconis =

Star in the constellation Draco

Observation data Epoch J2000 Equinox ICRS
- Constellation: Draco
- Right ascension: 20^{h} 11^{m} 34.872^{s}
- Declination: +62° 04′ 42.77″
- Apparent magnitude (V): 5.69

Characteristics
- Spectral type: F5 V
- B−V color index: 0.48

Astrometry
Radial velocity (R_{v})	−14.6 km/s
Proper motion (μ)	RA: +142.267 mas/yr Dec.: +72.842 mas/yr
Parallax (π)	20.9232±0.065 mas
Distance	155.9 ± 0.5 ly (47.8 ± 0.1 pc)
Absolute magnitude (M_{V})	2.33

Details
Mass	1.15 M_{☉}
Luminosity	10.73 L_{☉}
Surface gravity (log g)	3.95 cgs
Temperature	6,137 K
Metallicity [Fe/H]	0.20 dex
Rotational velocity (v sin i)	15.1 km/s
Age	1.7 Gyr

Other designations
- 68 Dra, BD+61°1983, HD 192455, HIP 99500, HR 7727, SAO 18751

Database references
SIMBAD	data

68 Draconis is the Flamsteed designation for a star in the northern circumpolar constellation of Draco. It has an apparent visual magnitude of 5.69, so, according to the Bortle scale, it is faintly visible to the naked eye from suburban skies at night. Measurements made with the Gaia spacecraft show an annual parallax shift of 0.0209232″, which is equivalent to a distance of around 156 ly (48 pc) from the Sun. It is moving closer to the Earth with a heliocentric radial velocity of –14.6 km/s. The star has a relatively high proper motion, traversing the celestial sphere at a rate of 0.150″ per year.

The stellar classification of 68 Draconis is F5 V, indicating that it is a main sequence star that is fusing hydrogen into helium at its core to generate energy. The star appears to be over-luminous for a member of its class, being 0.73 magnitudes brighter than expected. This may indicate that this is a binary system with an unresolved secondary component. It has 15% more mass than the Sun but is less than half as old, with an estimated age of 1.7 billion years. The star is radiating 11 times the Sun's luminosity from its photosphere at an effective temperature of 6,137 K, giving it the yellow-white hue of an F-type star.
