= 50 Draconis =

Binary star system in the constellation Draco

Observation data Epoch J2000 Equinox J2000
- Constellation: Draco
- Right ascension: 18^{h} 46^{m} 22.24188^{s}
- Declination: +75° 26′ 02.2400″
- Apparent magnitude (V): 5.369±0.001 (5.997 + 6.238)

Characteristics
- Evolutionary stage: Main sequence
- Spectral type: A2Vp
- Variable type: Rotating ellipsoidal variable

Astrometry
Radial velocity (R_{v})	−6.53±0.09 km/s
Proper motion (μ)	RA: −17.061 mas/yr Dec.: +70.391 mas/yr
Parallax (π)	11.4150±0.1058 mas
Distance	286 ± 3 ly (87.6 ± 0.8 pc)
Absolute magnitude (M_{V})	+0.70

Orbit
Period (P)	4.117719(2) days
Semi-major axis (a)	13.184±0.026 R_{☉}
Eccentricity (e)	0.0021±0.0003
Inclination (i)	49.9±0.8°
Argument of periastron (ω) (secondary)	94.85±0.02°
Semi-amplitude (K_{1}) (primary)	78.93±0.02 km/s
Semi-amplitude (K_{2}) (secondary)	82.96±0.20 km/s

Details

50 Dra A
Mass	2.08±0.08 M_{☉}
Radius	2.06±0.09 R_{☉}
Surface gravity (log g)	4.13±0.05 cgs
Temperature	9,800±100 K
Metallicity [Fe/H]	+0.21±0.09 dex
Rotation	4.117719(2) days
Rotational velocity (v sin i)	19±1 km/s

50 Dra B
Mass	1.97±0.08 M_{☉}
Radius	1.99±0.09 R_{☉}
Surface gravity (log g)	4.13±0.05 cgs
Temperature	9,200±200 K
Metallicity [Fe/H]	+0.08±0.10 dex
Rotation	4.117719(2) days
Rotational velocity (v sin i)	19±1 km/s

Other designations
- BD+75°682, HD 175286, HIP 92112, HR 7124, TYC 4583-2839-1

Database references
SIMBAD	data

50 Draconis is a binary star in the constellation Draco. At an apparent magnitude of +5.369, it is faintly visible to the naked eye in locations far from light pollution. Parallax measurements give a distance of 286 light-years (88 parsecs).

== Characteristics ==
50 Draconis was first discovered to be a binary in 1914 at the American Astronomical Society. A spectroscopic binary, the existence of a companion was inferred from periodic variations in the spectral lines, corresponding to the orbital motion of the stars.

The system has a very tight orbit, with an orbital period of just 4.11 days and an orbital separation of 13.184 solar radii (9,172,000 km) at a low eccentricity of 0.002. The orbit is inclined at 50 degrees from Earth and thus the system is not eclipsing. The components are so close to each other that their shapes are distorted by gravity, and during the orbit the surfaces visible from Earth, and hence the luminosities, vary, making the system a rotating ellipsoidal variable. The stars are tidally locked, with rotation periods synchronized with the orbital period.

Relative to the Sun, the stars are overabundant in iron peak and rare-earth elements, but underabundant in scandium, classifying them as Am stars. The components are similar to each other, with around twice the mass and radius of the Sun, and effective temperatures of 9,800 and 9,200 K for the primary and secondary respectively, temperatures at the upper range for Am stars.
