= 7 Draconis =

Star in the constellation Draco

- Location of 7 Draconis (circled in red)

Observation data Epoch J2000.0 Equinox J2000.0 (ICRS)
- Constellation: Draco
- Right ascension: 12^{h} 47^{m} 34.34473^{s}
- Declination: +66° 47′ 25.0977″
- Apparent magnitude (V): 5.43

Characteristics
- Spectral type: K5 III
- B−V color index: 1.567±0.006

Astrometry
Radial velocity (R_{v})	+11.33 km/s
Proper motion (μ)	RA: 6.674 mas/yr Dec.: −6.498 mas/yr
Parallax (π)	4.1601±0.1056 mas
Distance	780 ± 20 ly (240 ± 6 pc)
Absolute magnitude (M_{V})	−1.35

Details
Mass	1.13 M_{☉}
Radius	63 R_{☉}
Luminosity	1,024 L_{☉}
Surface gravity (log g)	1.04 cgs
Temperature	3,903 K
Age	2.3 Gyr

Other designations
- Tianyi, 7 Dra, BD+67°764, FK5 3020, HD 111335, HIP 62423, HR 4863, SAO 15902

Database references
SIMBAD	data

7 Draconis, also named Tianyi /tiænˈjiː/, is a single star in the northern circumpolar constellation of Draco. It is visible to the naked eye as a faint orange-hued star with a stellar classification of 5.43. Based upon an annual parallax shift of 4.16 mas as seen from the Earth, the star is located approximately 780 light-years from the Sun.

This is an evolved giant star with a stellar classification of K5 III. The measured angular diameter of this star, after correction for limb darkening, is 2.61±0.03 mas. At its estimated distance, this yields a physical size of about 63 times the radius of the Sun. It is radiating about 1,024 times the Sun's luminosity from its enlarged photosphere at an effective temperature of 3,903 K.

== Nomenclature ==
7 Draconis is the star's Flamsteed designation.

The star bore the traditional Chinese name of Tianyi, from 天乙 (Tiān Yǐ) or 天一 (Tiān Yī, the Celestial Great One), a deity in Taoism. Alternatively, Tianyi may refer to 10 Draconis (Note: Stellarium, citing Yi Shitong, 1981) or κ Draconis, with 7 and 8 Draconis forming Neichu, representing a private kitchen. In 2016, the International Astronomical Union organized a Working Group on Star Names (WGSN) to catalogue and standardize proper names for stars. The WGSN approved the name Tianyi for this star on 30 June 2017 and it is now so entered in the IAU Catalog of Star Names.
