= Psi2 Draconis =

Star in the constellation Draco

ψ^{2} Draconis
- Location of ψ^{2} Draconis (circled in red)

Observation data Epoch J2000.0 Equinox J2000.0 (ICRS)
- Constellation: Draco
- Right ascension: 17^{h} 55^{m} 11.15296^{s}
- Declination: +72° 00′ 18.4470″
- Apparent magnitude (V): 5.45

Characteristics
- Spectral type: F2 III+ or F3 II-III
- U−B color index: +0.15
- B−V color index: +0.30

Astrometry
Radial velocity (R_{v})	−2.0 km/s
Proper motion (μ)	RA: +8.545 mas/yr Dec.: −2.133 mas/yr
Parallax (π)	3.4888±0.0832 mas
Distance	930 ± 20 ly (287 ± 7 pc)
Absolute magnitude (M_{V})	−2.12±0.14

Details
Mass	2.02 M_{☉}
Radius	14.70+0.64 −0.34 R_{☉}
Luminosity	448±13 L_{☉}
Surface gravity (log g)	2.32 cgs
Temperature	6925+83 −152 K
Metallicity [Fe/H]	−1.29 dex
Rotational velocity (v sin i)	50 km/s
Age	800 Myr

Other designations
- ψ^{2} Dra, 34 Dra, BD+72°818, FK5 3429, HD 164613, HIP 87728, HR 6725, SAO 8961

Database references
SIMBAD	data

Psi^{2} Draconis is a solitary giant star in the northern circumpolar constellation of Draco, also designated 34 Draconis. It lies just over a degree east of the brighter Psi^{1} Draconis. Psi^{2} Draconis has a yellow-white hue and is dimly visible to the naked eye with an apparent visual magnitude of 5.45. It is located at a distance of 940 light-years (287 parsecs) from the Sun based on parallax, but is drifting closer with a radial velocity of −2 km/s.

According to R. O. Gray and associates (2001), the stellar classification of Psi^{2} Draconis is F2III+; a star that has used up its core hydrogen, cooled, and expanded away from the main sequence. A. P. Cowley and W. P. Bidelman (1979) found a similar class of F3 II-III, with the comment that the spectrum showed "many weak lines". Based on the abundance of iron, the metallicity of this star is much lower than in the Sun. It is about 800 million years old and is spinning with a projected rotational velocity of 50 km/s. The star has double the mass of the Sun but has expanded to 15 times the Sun's radius. It is radiating 448 times the luminosity of the Sun from its enlarged photosphere at an effective temperature of 6,925 K.
