= 45 Draconis =

Star in the constellation Draco

- Location of 45 Dra (circled)

Observation data Epoch J2000 Equinox J2000
- Constellation: Draco
- Right ascension: 18^{h} 32^{m} 34.52259^{s}
- Declination: +57° 02′ 44.1458″
- Apparent magnitude (V): 4.78

Characteristics
- Spectral type: F7Ib
- B−V color index: +0.59

Astrometry
Radial velocity (R_{v})	−12.50 km/s
Proper motion (μ)	RA: 0.068 mas/yr Dec.: −7.961 mas/yr
Parallax (π)	1.0200±0.0583 mas
Distance	3,200 ± 200 ly (980 ± 60 pc)
Absolute magnitude (M_{V})	−3.5

Details
Mass	8.2 M_{☉}
Radius	102 R_{☉}
Luminosity	12,700 L_{☉}
Surface gravity (log g)	2.1 - 2.4 cgs
Temperature	6,151 K
Metallicity [Fe/H]	−0.04 dex
Rotational velocity (v sin i)	10 km/s
Age	33 Myr

Other designations
- d Draconis, 45 Dra, BD+56°2113, FK5 3475, HD 171635, HIP 90905, HR 6978, SAO 31039

Database references
SIMBAD	data

45 Draconis is a single star located in the northern circumpolar constellation of Draco, around 3,200 light years from the Earth. 45 Draconis is the Flamsteed designation, while it has the Bayer designation of d Draconis. This object is visible to the naked eye as a faint, yellow-white hued star with an apparent visual magnitude of 4.78. Radial velocity measurements indicate it is moving closer to the Sun at the rate of −12.5 km/s.

This star has a stellar classification of F7Ib, matching an F-type supergiant. It is approximately 33 million years old with 8.2 times the mass of the Sun and about 102 times the Sun's radius. The star is radiating 12,700 times the Sun's luminosity from its photosphere at an effective temperature of 6,151 K.
