= HD 81817 =

Likely binary star in the constellation Draco

- Location of HD 81817 (circled in red)

Observation data Epoch J2000.0 Equinox ICRS
- Constellation: Draco
- Right ascension: 09^{h} 37^{m} 05.28778^{s}
- Declination: +81° 19′ 34.9711″
- Apparent magnitude (V): 4.28

Characteristics
- Spectral type: K3III + ? + DA2.8
- B−V color index: +1.488±0.001

Astrometry
Radial velocity (R_{v})	−6.98±0.10 km/s
Proper motion (μ)	RA: −16.62 mas/yr Dec.: −16.41 mas/yr
Parallax (π)	3.28±0.15 mas
Distance	990 ± 50 ly (300 ± 10 pc)
Absolute magnitude (M_{V})	−3.14

Details

A
Mass	4.3±0.5 M_{☉}
Radius	83.8±7.8 R_{☉}
Luminosity	1,822.9 L_{☉}
Temperature	4,140±55 K
Metallicity [Fe/H]	−0.17±0.1 dex
Rotation	801 d
Rotational velocity (v sin i)	4.7±0.1 km/s
Age	150±40 Myr

Other designations
- BD+81°302, FK5 910, HD 81817, HIP 47193, HR 3751, SAO 1551, WD 0930+815

Database references
SIMBAD	data
Exoplanet Archive	data

HD 81817 is a possible binary star system with two brown dwarf companions in the northern circumpolar constellation of Draco. It has an orange hue and is visible to the naked eye with an apparent visual magnitude of 4.28. The system is located at a distance of approximately 990 light years from the Sun based on parallax, and is drifting closer with a radial velocity of −7 km/s. It is a member of the IC 2391 moving group.

The primary component of this system is an aging giant star with a stellar classification of K3III. The star's chromosphere is of the type called "hybrid", displaying a cool stellar wind in combination with hot emission lines. It appears to be the source for the X-ray emission coming from this system. The star is 150 million years old with 4.3 times the mass of the Sun. With the supply of hydrogen at its core exhausted, the star has expanded to 83.8 times the Sun's radius. It is radiating 1,823 times the luminosity of the Sun from its photosphere at an effective temperature of 4,140 K.

A possible companion star was discovered in 1984 based upon its ultraviolet spectrum. The distribution of the far ultraviolet flux matches that of a white dwarf star of class DA. A 2020 study finds it unlikely that there is a white dwarf companion; instead claiming the radial velocity variations are caused by a substellar object HD 81817 b, probably a brown dwarf, and possibly another substellar object. HD 81817 b would have a minimum mass of 27.1 M_{J} and orbit at 3.3 AU with a period of 1047.1 days and an eccentricity of 0.17. Gaia DR2 astrometry also suggested a companion with a mass of about 124 M_{J} (with a high margin of error) orbiting at 2.67 AU, consistent with the radial velocity detection. If the latter mass estimate is correct, this object would be a low-mass star, probably a red dwarf. Further observations through 2022 have confirmed that the companion is indeed a brown dwarf, in addition to the detection of a second brown dwarf on a closer orbit.

The HD 81817 planetary system
Companion (in order from star)	Mass	Semimajor axis (AU)	Orbital period (years)	Eccentricity	Inclination (°)	Radius
c	≥22.609+1.859 −1.876 M_{J}	2.325+0.087 −0.095	1.706±0.006	0.095+0.058 −0.044	—	—
b	24.128+9.747 −0.691 M_{J}	3.233+0.125 −0.131	2.796+0.037 −0.027	0.097+0.090 −0.057	95.594+29.637 −35.307	—

== See also ==
- List of exoplanets discovered in 2020 - HD 81817 b
