= 39 Draconis =

Wide binary star system in the constellation of Draco

- Location of 39 Draconis (circled in red)

Observation data Epoch J2000 Equinox ICRS
- Constellation: Draco
- A
- Right ascension: 18^{h} 23^{m} 54.60689^{s}
- Declination: +58° 48′ 02.6667″
- Apparent magnitude (V): 5.06
- B
- Right ascension: 18^{h} 23^{m} 54.51639^{s}
- Declination: +58° 48′ 06.3674″
- Apparent magnitude (V): 8.07

Characteristics
- Evolutionary stage: main sequence
- Spectral type: A1V + F5V
- U−B color index: +0.06
- B−V color index: +0.10

Astrometry
Radial velocity (R_{v})	−24.53±0.23 km/s

A
Proper motion (μ)	RA: −37.322 mas/yr Dec.: +62.892 mas/yr
Parallax (π)	17.1615±0.0631 mas
Distance	190.1 ± 0.7 ly (58.3 ± 0.2 pc)
Absolute magnitude (M_{V})	+1.31

B
Proper motion (μ)	RA: −41.742 mas/yr Dec.: +61.076 mas/yr
Parallax (π)	17.2293±0.0219 mas
Distance	189.3 ± 0.2 ly (58.04 ± 0.07 pc)
Absolute magnitude (M_{V})	+4.32

Orbit
Period (P)	4,000±200 yr
Semi-major axis (a)	6.6±0.3″
Eccentricity (e)	0.553±0.005
Inclination (i)	107.7±0.12°
Longitude of the node (Ω)	179.9±0.10°
Periastron epoch (T)	5671.40±12.08
Argument of periastron (ω) (secondary)	128.0±2.2°

Details

39 Dra A
Mass	2.12 M_{☉}
Radius	2.3 R_{☉}
Luminosity	27 L_{☉}
Surface gravity (log g)	4.04 cgs
Temperature	8,630 K
Rotational velocity (v sin i)	186 km/s
Age	350 Myr

39 Dra B
Mass	1.18 M_{☉}
Radius	1.15 R_{☉}
Luminosity	1.85 L_{☉}
Surface gravity (log g)	4.40 cgs
Temperature	6,271 K
Rotation	5.9 days
Age	2.6 Gyr

Other designations
- b Dra, 39 Dra, BD+58°1809, HD 170073, HIP 90156, HR 6923, SAO 30949

Database references
SIMBAD	39 Dra
- 39 Dra A
- 39 Dra B

39 Draconis is a wide binary star system in the northern circumpolar constellation of Draco. It has the Bayer designation b Draconis, while 39 Draconis is the Flamsteed designation. This system is visible to the naked eye as a dim, white-hued point of light with a combined apparent visual magnitude of 5.0. Parallax measurements made by the Gaia spacecraft put it at a distance of 190 light-years, or 58 parsecs away from the Sun. The system is moving closer to the Earth with a heliocentric radial velocity of −24.5 km/s.

The two components of 39 Draconis have an angular separation of 6.621″ and take almost 4,000 years to orbit each other. The primary star is an early A-type main-sequence star, having 2.12 times the mass of the Sun with a visual magnitude of 5.06. The secondary is a magnitude 8.07 F-type main-sequence star, and has 1.18 times the mass of the Sun.

The 8th-magnitude star HD 238865 is listed in double star catalogues as component C. It is separated from the other two stars by 90″ and lies at about the same distance. It is itself a spectroscopic binary with an F8 primary and a red dwarf secondary orbiting every 2.7 days.
