= 4 Draconis =

Variable star in the constellation Draco

- Location of 4 Draconis (circled in red)

Observation data Epoch J2000.0 Equinox ICRS
- Constellation: Draco
- Right ascension: 12^{h} 30^{m} 06.66200^{s}
- Declination: +69° 12′ 03.9742″
- Apparent magnitude (V): 4.90 - 5.12

Characteristics
- Evolutionary stage: AGB + ?
- Spectral type: M3+ IIIa
- Variable type: Z Andromedae

Astrometry
Radial velocity (R_{v})	−15 km/s
Proper motion (μ)	RA: −57.311 mas/yr Dec.: −50.365 mas/yr
Parallax (π)	5.7233±0.1880 mas
Distance	570 ± 20 ly (175 ± 6 pc)
Absolute magnitude (M_{V})	−1.37

Orbit
Primary	4 Draconis A (red giant)
Name	4 Draconis B
Period (P)	1,703±3 d
Semi-major axis (a)	82±4 Gm ( a⋅sin(i) )
Eccentricity (e)	0.30±0.05
Periastron epoch (T)	2442868.5
Argument of periastron (ω) (primary)	244±9°
Semi-amplitude (K_{1}) (primary)	3.67±0.19 km/s

Details

red giant
Mass	1.64±0.2 M_{☉}
Radius	111.0+9.30 −11.2 R_{☉}
Luminosity	2,122±419 L_{☉}
Surface gravity (log g)	1.24 cgs
Temperature	3,718±69 K
Age	1.97±0.57 Gyr

white dwarf
Mass	~0.8 M_{☉}
Radius	0.0094 R_{☉}
Luminosity	(6.6–22)×10^{−3} L_{☉}
Surface gravity (log g)	8.4 cgs
Temperature	20,000±3,000 K

Other designations
- CQ Dra, HD 108907, HR 4765, HIP 60998, SAO 15816

Database references
SIMBAD	data

4 Draconis, also known as HR 4765 and CQ Draconis, is a star about 570 light years from the Earth, in the constellation Draco. It is a 5th magnitude star, so it will be faintly visible to the naked eye of an observer far from city lights. It is a variable star, whose brightness varies slightly from 4.90 to 5.12 over a period of 4.66 years.

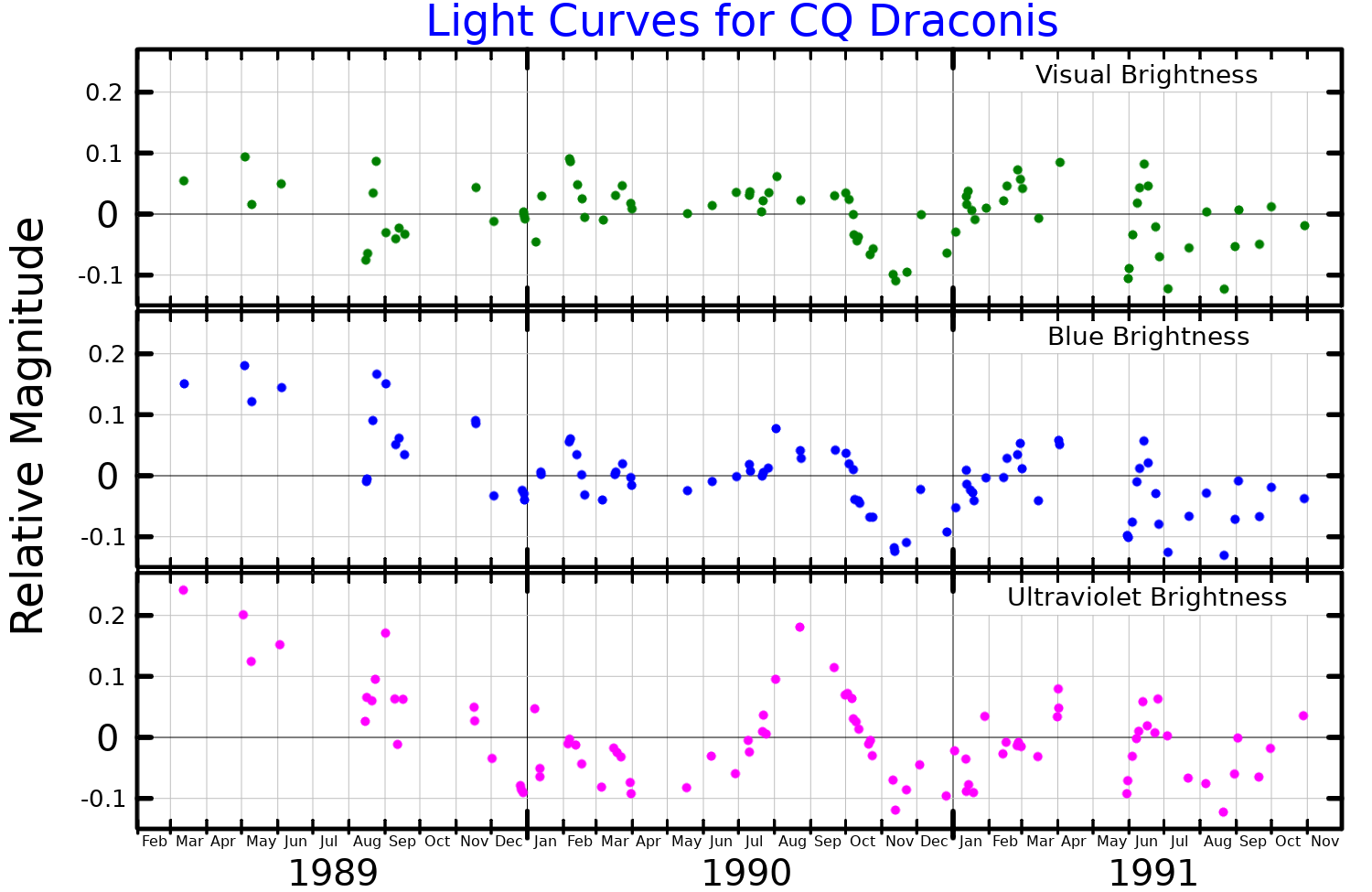
Light curves for CQ Draconis, adapted from Skopal et al. (1992) The brightening seen (most clearly in the ultraviolet) after June 1990 occurred shortly after the periastron passage.

In 1967, Olin Eggen discovered that 4 Draconis is a variable star, during a multicolor photometric survey of red stars. In 1973 it was given the variable star designation CQ Draconis.

Until the year 1985, 4 Draconis was thought to be a normal red giant star. In 1985, Dieter Reimers announced that the International Ultraviolet Explorer had detected a hot companion to the red giant, which itself appeared to be a binary cataclysmic variable star, making the complete system a triple star. However a 2003 study by Peter Wheatley et al., who examined ROSAT X-ray data for the star, concluded that the hot companion was more apt to be a single white dwarf, rather than a binary, and that the white dwarf is accreting material from the red giant. There does not yet appear to be a consensus about the multiplicity; some later studies consider 4 Draconis to be a binary, and some a triple.

In 1987, Alexander Brown announced that 6 cm wavelength radio emission had been detected by the Very Large Array. The strength of the radio emission was variable on a timescale of weeks to months.

It is possible that an outburst of 4 Draconis was the "guest star" reported by Chinese astronomers in the year 369 CE, in the constellation Zigong.
