= 36 Draconis =

Star in the constellation Draco

- Location of 36 Draconis (circled in red)

Observation data Epoch J2000 Equinox ICRS
- Constellation: Draco
- Right ascension: 18^{h} 13^{m} 53.83281^{s}
- Declination: +64° 23′ 50.2258″
- Apparent magnitude (V): 4.99

Characteristics
- Evolutionary stage: main sequence
- Spectral type: F5 V + M3
- B−V color index: +0.40

Astrometry
Radial velocity (R_{v})	−35.6 km/s
Proper motion (μ)	RA: +352.918 mas/yr Dec.: +355.572 mas/yr
Parallax (π)	43.1837±0.0940 mas
Distance	75.5 ± 0.2 ly (23.16 ± 0.05 pc)
Absolute magnitude (M_{V})	3.14 + 7.4

Details
Mass	1.23±0.15 M_{☉}
Radius	1.635±0.037 R_{☉}
Luminosity	4.66±0.12 L_{☉}
Surface gravity (log g)	4.1±0.5 cgs
Temperature	6,638±83 K
Metallicity [Fe/H]	−0.3±0.1 dex
Rotational velocity (v sin i)	8 km/s
Age	2.95 Gyr

Other designations
- 36 Dra, BD+64°1252, FK5 685, GJ 9619, HD 168151, HIP 89348, HR 6850, SAO 17828

Database references
SIMBAD	data

36 Draconis is a star in the northern constellation Draco. It is faintly visible to the naked eye with an apparent visual magnitude of 4.99. Based upon an annual parallax shift of 43.18 mas, it is located about 75.5 light years away. At that distance, the visual magnitude is diminished by an extinction of 0.129 due to interstellar dust. The star has a relatively high proper motion, traversing the celestial sphere at the rate of 0.353 arc seconds per year. It is moving closer to the Sun with a radial velocity of −35.6 km/s.

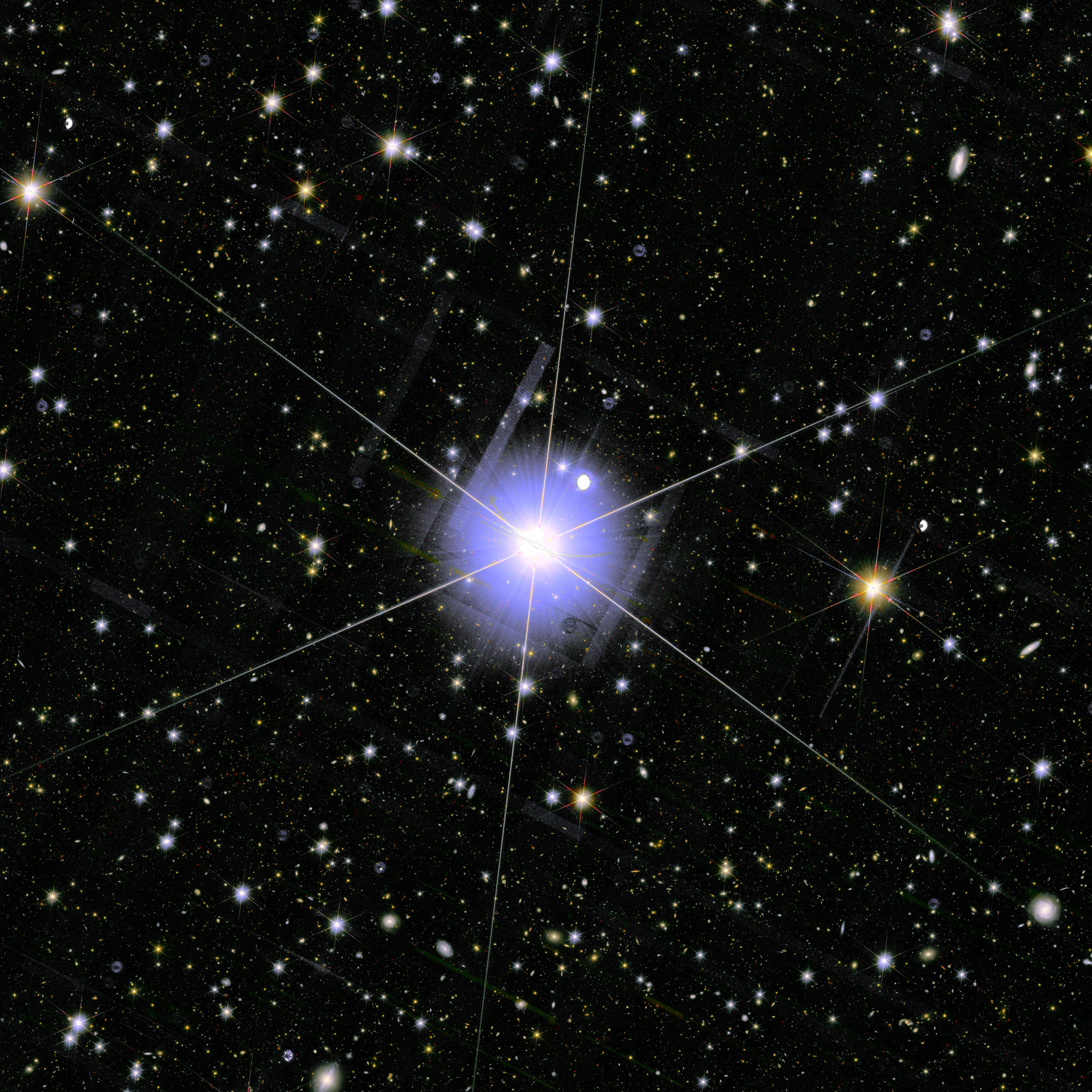
36 Draconis captured by the Euclid Space Telescope

This is an ordinary F-type main-sequence star with a stellar classification of F5 V. It has 1.23 times the mass of the Sun and 1.64 times the Sun's radius. The star is around three billion years old and is spinning with a projected rotational velocity of 8 km/s. It is radiating 4.7 times the Sun's luminosity from its photosphere at an effective temperature of 6,638 K.

Observations carried out in 2010 and 2012 detected a faint companion at an angular separation of 3.3 arcseconds. Judging by the age and magnitude, this is a red dwarf of class M3.
