= Phi Draconis =

Star in the constellation Draco

φ Draconis
- Location of φ Draconis (circled)

Observation data Epoch J2000 Equinox ICRS
- Constellation: Draco
- Right ascension: 18^{h} 20^{m} 45.43224^{s}
- Declination: +71° 20′ 16.1499″
- Apparent magnitude (V): 4.22

Characteristics
- Spectral type: B8VpSi + A4V + B9V
- U−B color index: −0.38
- B−V color index: −0.10
- Variable type: α^{2} CVn

Astrometry
Radial velocity (R_{v})	−16.44 km/s
Proper motion (μ)	RA: −5.03 mas/yr Dec.: +37.86 mas/yr
Parallax (π)	10.77±0.38 mas
Distance	300 ± 10 ly (93 ± 3 pc)
Absolute magnitude (M_{V})	−0.74 (−0.48/+0.94)

Orbit
Primary	A
Name	B
Period (P)	307.8 yr
Semi-major axis (a)	0.965" (89.60 au)
Eccentricity (e)	0.752
Inclination (i)	95.6°

Orbit
Primary	Aa
Name	Ab
Period (P)	127.914 d
Eccentricity (e)	0.6725
Inclination (i)	48°
Semi-amplitude (K_{1}) (primary)	33.87 km/s

Details

Aa
Mass	3.3 M_{☉}
Radius	2.7±0.2 R_{☉}
Luminosity	107 L_{☉}
Surface gravity (log g)	4.21±0.08 cgs
Temperature	11,429 K
Rotation	1.7165
Rotational velocity (v sin i)	81.5 km/s
Age	245 Myr

Ab
Mass	1.36 M_{☉}

B
Mass	2.25 M_{☉}
Age	330 Myr

Other designations
- φ Dra, 43 Dra, BD+71°889, CCDM J18208+7120AB, GC 25114, HD 170000, HIP 89908, HR 6920, SAO 9084

Database references
SIMBAD	data

Phi Draconis (φ Dra / φ Draconis) is a fourth-magnitude variable star in the constellation Draco. It has the Flamsteed designation 43 Draconis. It is also a triple star system where the brightest component is a chemically peculiar Ap star.

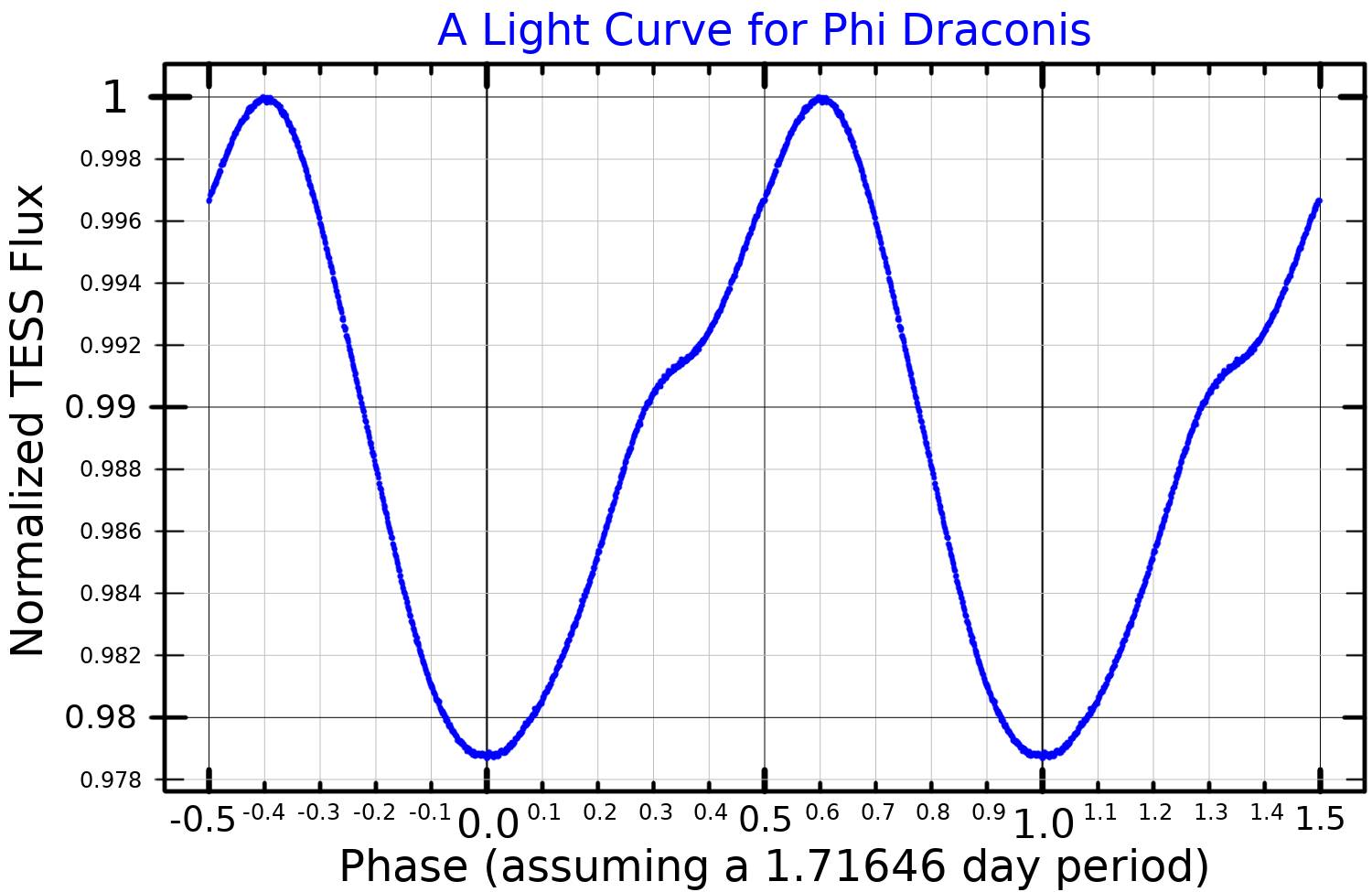
A light curve for Phi Draconis, plotted from TESS data

The brightness of φ Draconis varies by about 0.04 of a magnitude every 1.7 days. This is due to very strong magnetic fields at the surface of the star, and it is classified as an α^{2} Canum Venaticorum variable.

φ Draconis is a multiple star system containing three stars. The inner pair form a single-lined spectroscopic binary in an eccentric 128-day orbit. The outermost star orbits the inner pair every 308 years. The outer pair can be resolved visually and have a semi-major axis of 0.752″. A fourth component, C, is also listed in multiple star catalogues, but is only a chance alignment with the triple system.

Phi Draconis Aa is a main-sequence Ap star with a spectral class of B8. The main abundance excess is silicon, although iron and chromium and also notably elevated.

In Chinese astronomy, φ Draconis is called 柱史 (Pinyin: Zhùshǐ), meaning Official of Royal Archives, because this star is marking itself and stand alone in Official of Royal Archives asterism, Purple Forbidden enclosure (see: Chinese constellations).
