= Tau Draconis =

Star in the constellation Draco

- Location of τ Draconis (circled in red)

Observation data Epoch J2000.0 Equinox J2000.0 (ICRS)
- Constellation: Draco
- Right ascension: 19^{h} 15^{m} 33.05868^{s}
- Declination: +73° 21′ 19.6769″
- Apparent magnitude (V): 4.45

Characteristics
- Spectral type: K2 III:
- U−B color index: +1.45
- B−V color index: +1.25

Astrometry
Radial velocity (R_{v})	−33.70 km/s
Proper motion (μ)	RA: −115.29 mas/yr Dec.: +103.23 mas/yr
Parallax (π)	22.28±0.50 mas
Distance	146 ± 3 ly (45 ± 1 pc)
Absolute magnitude (M_{V})	+1.19

Details
Mass	1.25 M_{☉}
Luminosity	48 L_{☉}
Surface gravity (log g)	2.00 cgs
Temperature	4,413±77 K
Metallicity [Fe/H]	0.17±0.06 dex
Rotational velocity (v sin i)	8 km/s
Age	6.48 Gyr

Other designations
- τ Dra, 60 Dra, BD+73°857, FK5 729, HD 181984, HIP 94648, HR 7352, SAO 9366

Database references
SIMBAD	data

Tau Draconis, Latinized from τ Draconis, is an astrometric binary star system in the northern circumpolar constellation of Draco. The star is faintly visible to the naked eye, having an apparent visual magnitude of 4.45. Based upon an annual parallax shift of 22.28 mas as measured from Earth, it is located around 146 light years from the Sun. Its proper motion is propelling it across the sky at the rate of 0.176 arc seconds per year.

This is a K-type giant star with a stellar classification of K2 III:, where the semi-colon indicates some uncertainty about its spectral value. It is considered metal-rich star and is past the first dredge-up phase of its post-main sequence evolution, although it shows under-abundances of carbon and oxygen in its spectrum. The star has 1.25 times the mass of the Sun and is an estimated 6.48 billion years old. It is radiating 48 times the solar luminosity from its enlarged photosphere at an effective temperature of 4,413 K.
