= 59 Draconis =

Star in the constellation Draco

- Location of 59 Draconis (circled in red)

Observation data Epoch J2000 Equinox ICRS
- Constellation: Draco
- Right ascension: 19^{h} 09^{m} 09.88146^{s}
- Declination: +76° 33′ 37.8138″
- Apparent magnitude (V): 5.11

Characteristics
- Evolutionary stage: main sequence
- Spectral type: A9V
- B−V color index: 0.308
- Variable type: γ Dor?

Astrometry
Radial velocity (R_{v})	−3.77±0.50 km/s
Proper motion (μ)	RA: +52.390 mas/yr Dec.: −119.469 mas/yr
Parallax (π)	36.5363±0.1299 mas
Distance	89.3 ± 0.3 ly (27.37 ± 0.10 pc)
Absolute magnitude (M_{V})	2.93

Orbit
Period (P)	28.44±0.01 d
Semi-major axis (a)	0.22 AU
Eccentricity (e)	0.20±0.01
Periastron epoch (T)	2453244.3±0.3 JD
Argument of periastron (ω) (secondary)	56±4°
Semi-amplitude (K_{1}) (primary)	1.20±0.02 km/s

Details

A
Mass	1.447+0.014 −0.015 M_{☉}
Radius	1.488+0.031 −0.033 R_{☉}
Luminosity	4.861+0.285 −0.290 L_{☉}
Surface gravity (log g)	4.18±0.21 cgs
Temperature	7053±194 K
Rotational velocity (v sin i)	53.0±1.1 km/s
Age	436+156 −203 Myr

B
Mass	≥25 M_{Jup}

Other designations
- 59 Dra, NSV 11824, BD+76 717, GC 26484, GJ 9649, GJ 748.1, HD 180777, HIP 94083, HR 7312, SAO 9341, PPM 10093, PLX 4497

Database references
SIMBAD	data
ARICNS	data

59 Draconis is a star with a likely brown dwarf companion, located 89.3 light-years (27.4 parsecs) away in the constellation Draco. With an apparent magnitude of 5.1, it is faintly visible to the naked eye under good viewing conditions. In Chinese astronomy, this star is known as Tiānzhùsì (天柱四), meaning it is the fourth star of the asterism Tiānzhù (天柱, Celestial Pillar). (Note: Stellarium, citing Yi Shitong, 1981)

The stellar classification of 59 Draconis is A9V, indicating that it is an A-type main-sequence star that is generating energy through hydrogen fusion at its core. Other sources classify it as A7V or F0Vs. It has a similar chemical abundance to the Sun. The star is listed as a suspected variable, with pulsations resembling those of Gamma Doradus stars. It is a candidate member of the Ursa Major Moving Group stream, though a 2020 study listed its membership probability as only 33%. It appears to be rotating with an inclination of about 28° to the plane of the sky.

The detection of a companion via Doppler spectroscopy was announced in 2006. This object orbits with a period of 28.4 days and has a minimum mass of 25 M_{J}, in the range of brown dwarfs. Since the inclination of the orbit is unknown, the true mass cannot be determined, and it remains possible that it is a star rather than a brown dwarf. Hipparcos astrometry has set an upper limit on its mass of 0.27 M_{☉}. If confirmed as a brown dwarf, it is within the brown dwarf desert, a range of orbits where few brown dwarfs are found.
