= 26 Draconis =

Star in the constellation Draco

Observation data Epoch J2000 Equinox ICRS
- Constellation: Draco
- AB
- Right ascension: 17^{h} 34^{m} 59.62474^{s}
- Declination: +61° 52′ 28.2418″
- Apparent magnitude (V): 5.236
- C
- Right ascension: 17^{h} 35^{m} 34.47852^{s}
- Declination: +61° 40′ 53.6281″
- Apparent magnitude (V): 9.97

Characteristics

AB
- Evolutionary stage: main sequence
- Spectral type: G0Va (F9V + K3V)
- U−B color index: +0.100
- B−V color index: +0.595

C
- Evolutionary stage: main sequence
- Spectral type: M0.5V
- B−V color index: +1.48

Astrometry

AB
Radial velocity (R_{v})	−15.72±0.33 km/s
Proper motion (μ)	RA: 236.247 mas/yr Dec.: −466.111 mas/yr
Parallax (π)	69.2832±0.2004 mas
Distance	47.1 ± 0.1 ly (14.43 ± 0.04 pc)
Absolute magnitude (M_{V})	4.58±0.011

C
Radial velocity (R_{v})	−15.53±0.16 km/s
Proper motion (μ)	RA: 261.923 mas/yr Dec.: −514.499 mas/yr
Parallax (π)	69.8921±0.0153 mas
Distance	46.67 ± 0.01 ly (14.308 ± 0.003 pc)

Orbit
Primary	26 Dra A
Name	26 Dra B
Period (P)	76.1 yr
Semi-major axis (a)	1.53″
Eccentricity (e)	0.18
Inclination (i)	104°
Longitude of the node (Ω)	151°
Periastron epoch (T)	1947
Argument of periastron (ω) (secondary)	307°

Details

AB
Mass	1.30/0.83 M_{☉}
Surface gravity (log g)	4.50 cgs
Temperature	6,000 K
Metallicity [Fe/H]	−0.18 dex
Rotational velocity (v sin i)	10 km/s
Age	8.4–11.5 Gyr

C
Mass	0.55±0.06 M_{☉}
Radius	0.54±0.05 R_{☉}
Surface gravity (log g)	4.72±0.05 cgs
Temperature	3816±69 K
Metallicity [Fe/H]	−0.15±0.09 dex
Rotation	18.15+0.15 −0.16 d
Rotational velocity (v sin i)	1.33±0.42 km/s

Other designations
- ADS 10660, CCDM J17351+6152, WDS J17350+6153
- AB: 26 Dra, BD+61 1678, GJ 684, HD 160269, HIP 86036, HR 6573, SAO 17546, LHS 3305, LTT 15223
- C: GJ 685, HIP 86087, G 226-66, LHS 3306, LTT 15224

Database references
SIMBAD	A
- B
- C

26 Draconis is a triple star system in the constellation Draco, located 47 light-years from the Sun. Two of the system components, A and B, form a spectroscopic binary that completes an orbit every 76 years. The composite spectral classification of the AB pair is G0V, which decomposes to individual spectral types F9V and K3V. A 1962 study estimated the masses of these two stars as 1.30 and 0.83 times the mass of the Sun, respectively. The stars are considered moderately metal-poor compared to the Sun, which means they have a lower proportion of elements other than hydrogen or helium.

The space velocity components of 26 Draconis are U = +36.5, V = −4.3 and W = −21.8 km/s. This system is on an orbit through the Milky Way galaxy that has an eccentricity of 0.14, taking it as close as 23.1 kly (7.08 kpc) and as far as 30.4 kly (9.32 kpc) from the galactic core. The inclination of this orbit carries the star system as much as 0.75 kly (0.23 kpc) above the plane of the galactic disk. This system may be a member of the Ursa Major moving group.

== Gliese 685 ==
The third component, GJ 685, is a red dwarf with spectral classification of M0V. As of 1970, this star is separated by 737.9 arc seconds from the AB pair and they share a common proper motion. The star GJ 685 has one known planet in orbit that was detected by radial velocity.

The Gliese 685 planetary system
Companion (in order from star)	Mass	Semimajor axis (AU)	Orbital period (days)	Eccentricity	Inclination (°)	Radius
b	≥9.0+1.7 −1.8 M_{🜨}	0.1344+0.0052 −0.0051	24.160+0.061 −0.047	—	—	—
