= 6 Draconis =

Binary star system in the constellation Draco

- Location of 6 Draconis (circled in red)

Observation data Epoch J2000 Equinox ICRS
- Constellation: Draco
- Right ascension: 12^{h} 34^{m} 44.01929^{s}
- Declination: +70° 01′ 18.4053″
- Apparent magnitude (V): 4.95

Characteristics
- Evolutionary stage: red giant branch
- Spectral type: K2.5 III Fe-2 + A8–9 V
- B−V color index: 1.312±0.003

Astrometry
Radial velocity (R_{v})	3.38±0.30 km/s
Proper motion (μ)	RA: −32.393 mas/yr Dec.: −4.449 mas/yr
Parallax (π)	6.6159±0.4238 mas
Distance	490 ± 30 ly (151 ± 10 pc)
Absolute magnitude (M_{V})	−1.35

Orbit
Period (P)	561.7±0.3 d
Eccentricity (e)	0.262±0.017
Periastron epoch (T)	45525±5 MJD
Argument of periastron (ω) (secondary)	9±4°
Semi-amplitude (K_{1}) (primary)	6.90±0.12 km/s

Details
Mass	1.28 M_{☉}
Radius	33 R_{☉}
Luminosity	316 L_{☉}
Surface gravity (log g)	1.43 cgs
Temperature	4,134 K
Metallicity [Fe/H]	−0.22 dex
Rotational velocity (v sin i)	1.7 km/s
Age	2.2 Gyr

Other designations
- 6 Dra, BD+70°705, HD 109551, HIP 61384, HR 4795, SAO 7600

Database references
SIMBAD	data

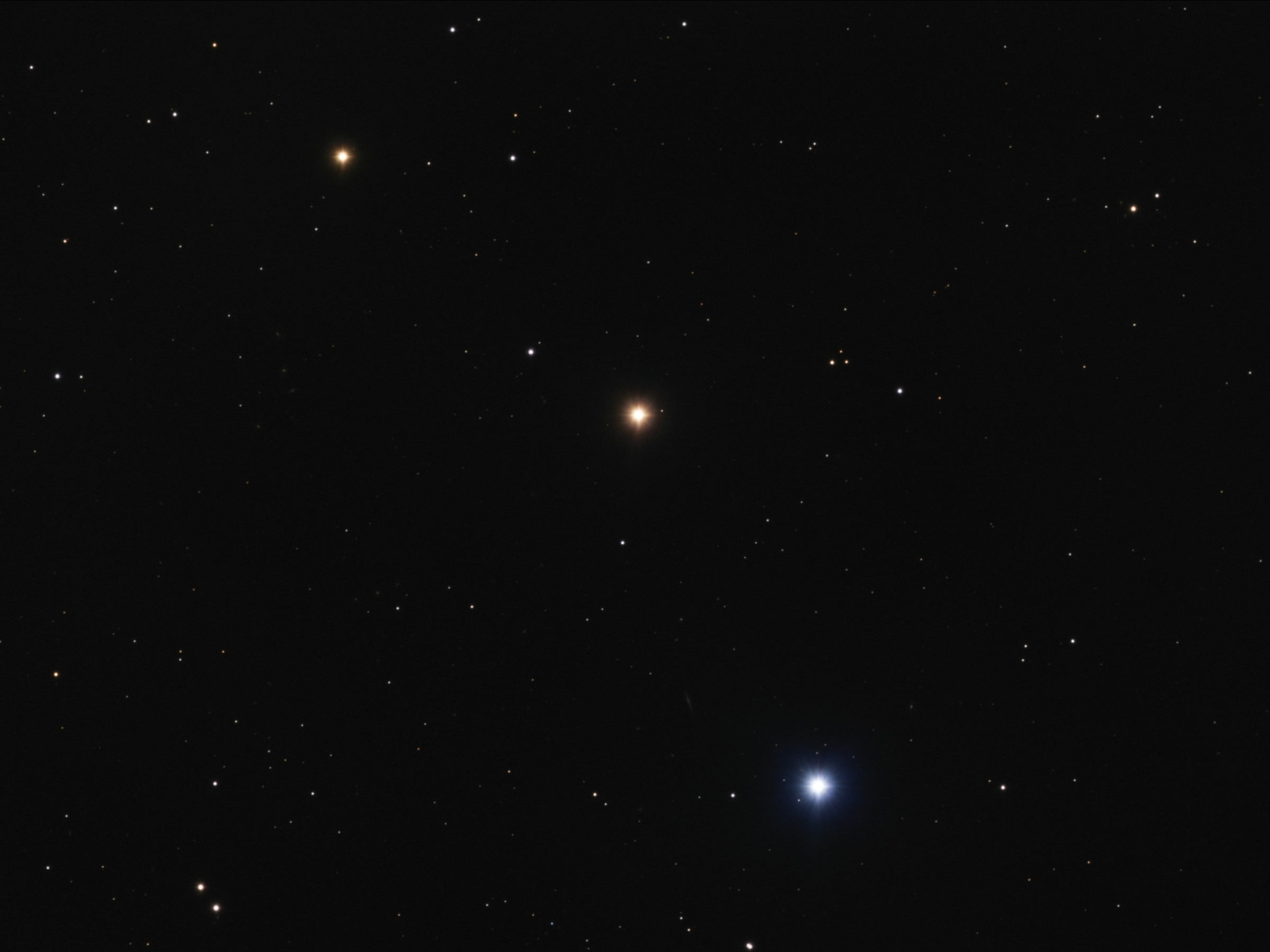
6 Draconis(center) and κ Draconis (below)

6 Draconis is a single-lined spectroscopic binary star system in the northern constellation of Draco, located about 430 light years away from the Sun. It is visible to the naked eye as an orange-hued star with an apparent visual magnitude of 4.95. The system is moving further from the Earth with a heliocentric radial velocity of 3 km/s.

The variable radial velocity of this star system was announced by W. W. Campbell in 1922. Griffin et al. (1990) found an orbital period of 1.5 yr and an eccentricity of 0.26. The primary has an "a sin i" value of 51.4 Gm (0.34 AU), where a is the semimajor axis and i is the (unknown) orbital inclination. This value provides a lower bound on the actual semimajor axis, which is one half of the longest dimension of their elliptical orbit.

The visible component is an evolved giant star with a stellar classification of K2.5 III Fe-2, where the suffix notation indicates a pronounced underabundance of iron in the spectrum. The measured angular diameter of this star, after correction for limb darkening, is 2.54±0.04 mas. At its estimated distance, this yields a physical size of about 33 times the radius of the Sun. It is radiating 316 times the Sun's luminosity from its enlarged photosphere at an effective temperature of 4,134 K. The companion is most likely an A-type main-sequence star with a class of A8–9 V.
