= HD 91190 =

Star in the constellation Draco

- Location of HD 91190 (circled in red)

Observation data Epoch J2000 Equinox ICRS
- Constellation: Draco
- Right ascension: 10^{h} 35^{m} 05.49034^{s}
- Declination: +75° 42′ 46.4467″
- Apparent magnitude (V): 4.86

Characteristics
- Evolutionary stage: red giant branch
- Spectral type: G8 III-IIIb
- B−V color index: 0.957±0.003

Astrometry
Radial velocity (R_{v})	+16.6 km/s
Proper motion (μ)	RA: −20.218 mas/yr Dec.: +1.482 mas/yr
Parallax (π)	13.0453±0.1053 mas
Distance	250 ± 2 ly (76.7 ± 0.6 pc)
Absolute magnitude (M_{V})	+0.46

Details
Mass	2.39 M_{☉}
Luminosity	69 L_{☉}
Surface gravity (log g)	2.59 cgs
Temperature	4,965±106 K
Metallicity [Fe/H]	−0.03 dex
Age	2.06 Gyr

Other designations
- BD+76°393, FK5 395, HD 91190, HIP 51808, HR 4126, SAO 7164

Database references
SIMBAD	data

HD 91190 is a suspected astrometric binary star system in the northern circumpolar constellation of Draco. It is faintly visible to the naked eye, having an apparent visual magnitude of 4.86. The distance to HD 91190, as estimated from its annual parallax shift of 13.0 mas, is around 250 light years. This system is moving further away from the Sun with a heliocentric radial velocity of +17 km/s, having come to within 170 ly some 2.4 million years ago.

At the age of about two billion years, this is an evolved G-type giant star with a stellar classification of G8 III-IIIb. It has 2.39 times the mass of the Sun and is radiating 69 times the Sun's luminosity from its photosphere at an effective temperature of around 4,965 K.
