= 18 Draconis =

Star in the constellation Draco

- Location of 18 Dra (circled in red)

Observation data Epoch J2000 Equinox ICRS
- Constellation: Draco
- Right ascension: 16^{h} 40^{m} 55.11952^{s}
- Declination: +64° 35′ 20.5824″
- Apparent magnitude (V): 4.84

Characteristics
- Evolutionary stage: horizontal branch
- Spectral type: K0 III CN−0.5 CH−2 Ca1
- B−V color index: 1.212±0.003

Astrometry
Radial velocity (R_{v})	−1.37±0.09 km/s
Proper motion (μ)	RA: −0.599 mas/yr Dec.: −17.436 mas/yr
Parallax (π)	4.5045±0.1730 mas
Distance	720 ± 30 ly (222 ± 9 pc)
Absolute magnitude (M_{V})	−1.92

Details
Mass	3.81±0.38 M_{☉}
Radius	46.83±1.74 R_{☉}
Luminosity	786.7±56.3 L_{☉}
Surface gravity (log g)	1.69±0.06 cgs
Temperature	4,471±23 K
Metallicity [Fe/H]	−0.13±0.10 dex
Age	280±80 Myr

Other designations
- g Dra, 18 Dra, BD+64°1145, FK5 3326, HD 151101, HIP 81660, HR 6223, SAO 17188

Database references
SIMBAD	data

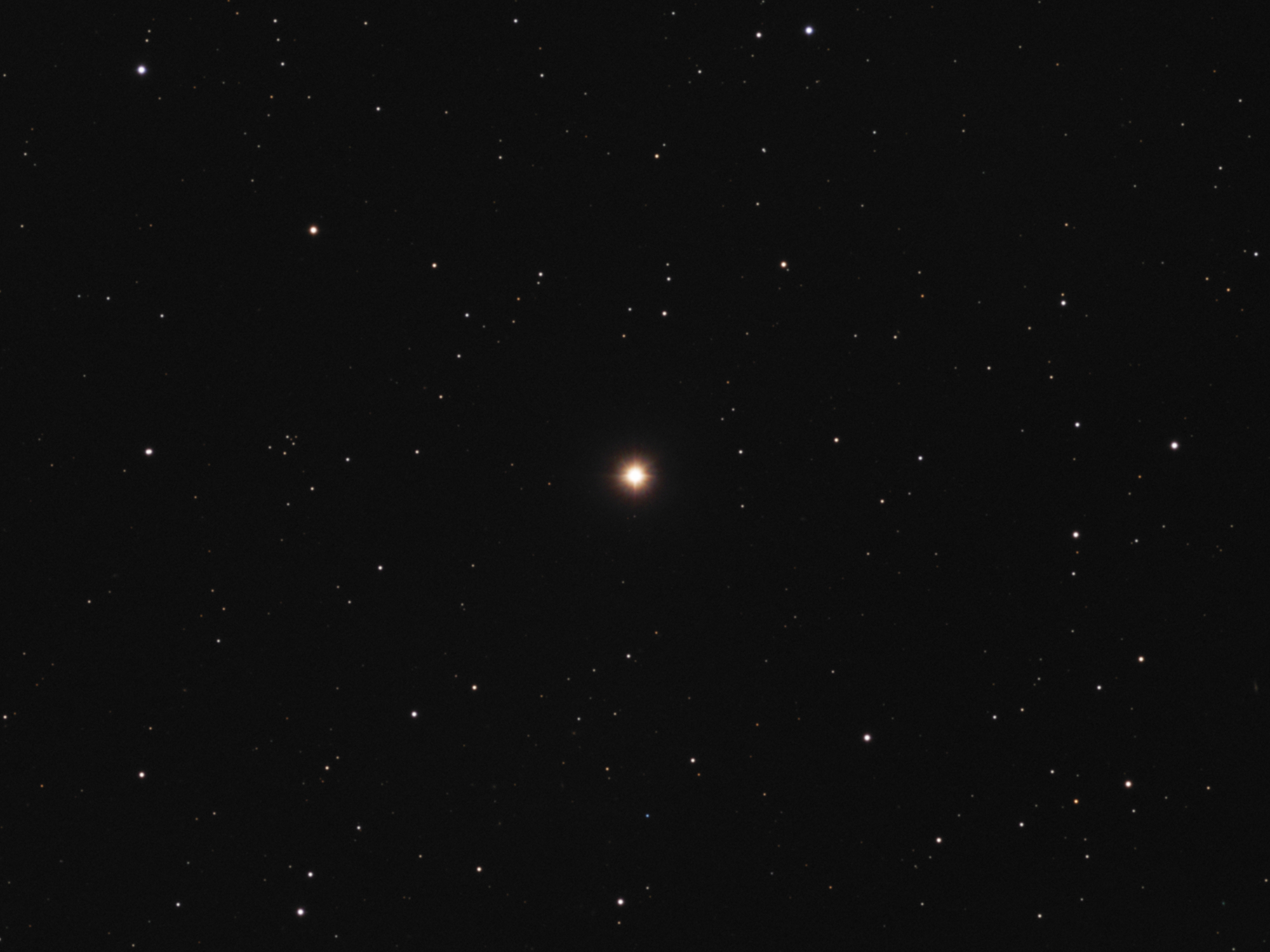
18 Draconis in optical light

18 Draconis is a likely binary star system in the northern circumpolar constellation of Draco. With an apparent visual magnitude of 4.84, it is just bright enough to be faintly visible to the naked eye. The distance to this system, as estimated from an annual parallax shift of 4.5 mas, is roughly 720 light years (220 parsecs). It is moving closer to the Sun with a heliocentric radial velocity of −1.4 km/s, and is a probable member of the Sirius stream of co-moving stars.

The visible component has a stellar classification of K0 III CN−0.5 CH−2 Ca1, indicating it is an evolved K-type giant star with some abundance peculiarities in its atmosphere. At the age of around 280 million years, it is most likely (99% chance) on the horizontal branch. It is a barium star, which suggests it may have a degenerate white dwarf companion from which it accreted materials during an earlier stage of its evolution. 18 Dra has an estimated 3.8 times the mass of the Sun and has expanded to 47 times the Sun's radius. The star is radiating 787 times the Sun's luminosity from its enlarged photosphere at an effective temperature of 4,471 K.
