= 19 Draconis =

Star in the constellation Draco

- Location of 19 Dra (circled in red)

Observation data Epoch J2000 Equinox ICRS
- Constellation: Draco
- Right ascension: 16^{h} 56^{m} 01.68925^{s}
- Declination: +65° 08′ 05.2631″
- Apparent magnitude (V): 4.89

Characteristics
- Evolutionary stage: main sequence
- Spectral type: F8V
- U−B color index: -0.03
- B−V color index: +0.485

Astrometry
Radial velocity (R_{v})	−21.00 ± 0.8 km/s
Proper motion (μ)	RA: 237.79 mas/yr Dec.: 50.84 mas/yr
Parallax (π)	65.54±0.33 mas
Distance	49.8 ± 0.3 ly (15.26 ± 0.08 pc)
Absolute magnitude (M_{V})	3.98

Orbit
Period (P)	52.1089 ± 0.0001 d
Semi-major axis (a)	20.0 mas
Eccentricity (e)	0.2221 ± 0.0002
Inclination (i)	90.5 ± 2.2°
Longitude of the node (Ω)	23.5 ± 2.0°
Periastron epoch (T)	JD 2453427.880 ± 0.007
Argument of periastron (ω) (secondary)	338.46 ± 0.05°
Semi-amplitude (K_{1}) (primary)	17.465 ± 0.004 km/s

Details

19 Dra A
Mass	1.04 M_{☉}
Radius	1.2 R_{☉}
Luminosity	2.02 L_{☉}
Temperature	6298 ± 80 K
Metallicity	Z = 0.013 ± 0.004
Age	4.7 Gyr

19 Dra B
Mass	0.37 M_{☉}
Radius	0.3 R_{☉}
Luminosity	0.02 L_{☉}
Temperature	~3963 (Note: From L = 4πR^{2}σT_{eff}^{4}, rearranging to make T_{eff} = (L / 4πR^{2}σ)^{1/4}. Where L is the luminosity, R is the radius, T_{eff} is the effective surface temperature and σ is the Stefan–Boltzmann constant.) K

Other designations
- BD+65°1157, GJ 648, HD 153597, HIP 82860, HR 6315, SAO 17281

Database references
SIMBAD	data
ARICNS	data

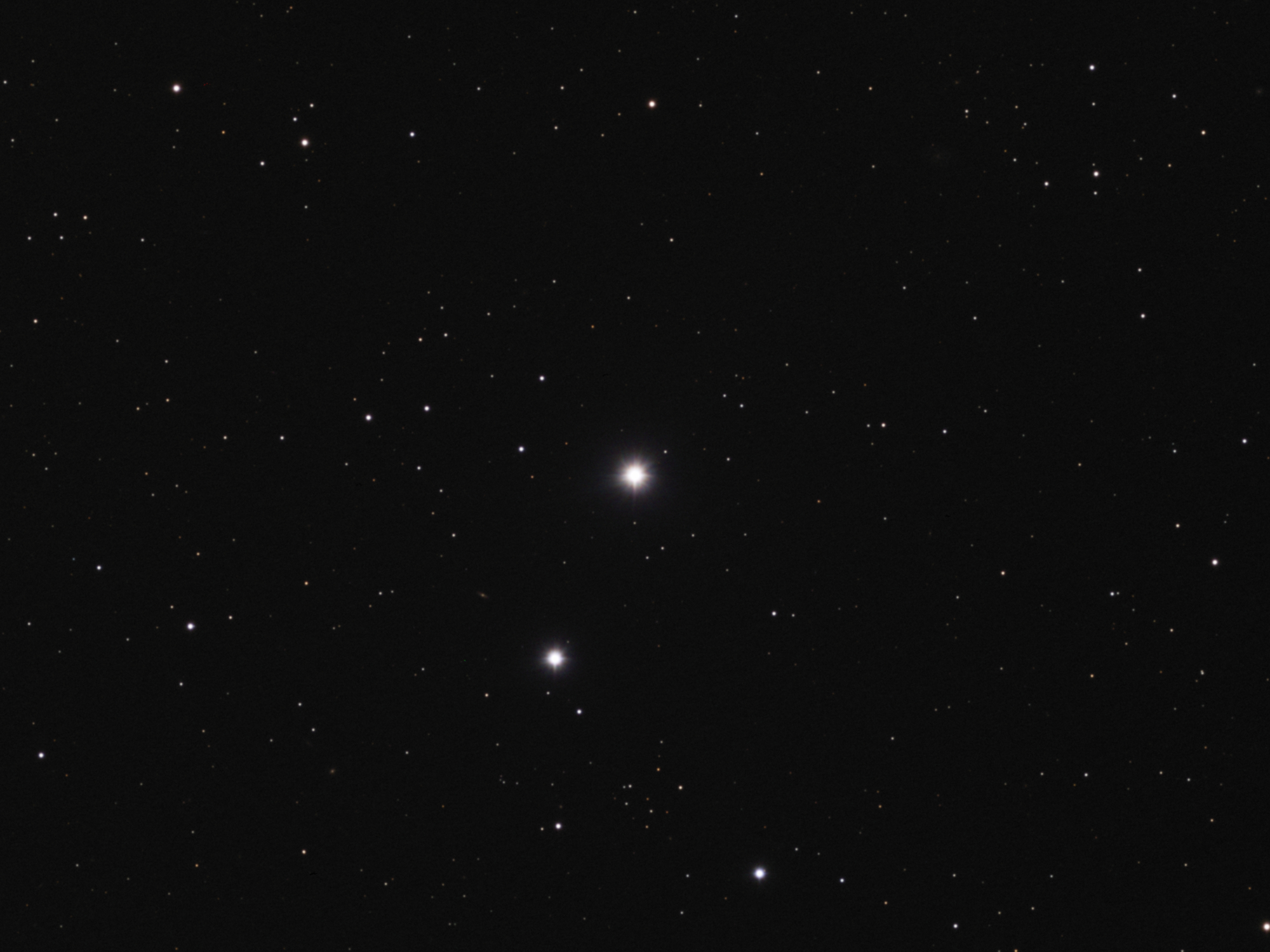
19 Draconis in optical light

19 Draconis, also known as h Draconis, is a star system in the constellation Draco. It is visible to the naked eye as a faint, yellow-white hued star with an apparent visual magnitude of 4.89. Based on its parallax, the system is located about 49.8 light-years (15.26 parsecs) away. It is moving closer to the Earth with a heliocentric radial velocity of −21 km/s.

This is a binary star system with an orbital period of 52.1 days and an eccentricity of 0.22. Only the primary star can be directly detected, via Doppler shifts or perturbations around the system's barycenter. Using spectroscopy and astrometry, the nature of the secondary star can be inferred. The primary star is an F-type main-sequence star with a stellar classification of F8V, 4% more massive than the Sun. Its surface temperature is about 6,298 K, and it emits just over twice the amount of energy that the Sun does. The secondary is only 37% as massive as the Sun, and its luminosity is only 2% that of the Sun. The system is about 4.7 billion years old.
