= 15 Draconis =

Star in the constellation Draco

Observation data Epoch J2000 Equinox J2000
- Constellation: Draco
- Right ascension: 16^{h} 27^{m} 59.01603^{s}
- Declination: +68° 46′ 05.3051″
- Apparent magnitude (V): 4.94

Characteristics
- Spectral type: B9.5IV
- B−V color index: −0.051±0.006

Astrometry
Radial velocity (R_{v})	−6.7±2.8 km/s
Proper motion (μ)	RA: −24.818 mas/yr Dec.: +33.623 mas/yr
Parallax (π)	7.2102±0.1296 mas
Distance	452 ± 8 ly (139 ± 2 pc)
Absolute magnitude (M_{V})	−0.93

Details
Mass	2.6 M_{☉}
Radius	4.9 R_{☉}
Luminosity	213 L_{☉}
Surface gravity (log g)	3.47 cgs
Temperature	9,994 K
Rotational velocity (v sin i)	154 km/s
Age	306 Myr

Other designations
- A Draconis, 15 Dra, BD+69°850, FK5 619, HD 149212, HIP 80650, HR 6161, SAO 17107

Database references
SIMBAD	data

15 Draconis is a single star in the northern circumpolar constellation of Draco, located 452 light years away from the Sun. 15 Draconis is the Flamsteed designation; it also has the Bayer designation A Draconis. This object is visible to the naked eye as a white-hued star with an apparent visual magnitude of 4.94. It is moving closer to the Earth with a heliocentric radial velocity of −7 km/s.

This star has a stellar classification of A0 III, matching that of an A-type giant star. It has a relatively high rate of spin with a projected rotational velocity of 154 km/s. The star is radiating 213 times the Sun's luminosity from its photosphere at an effective temperature of 9,994 K.
