= 10 Draconis =

Star in the constellation Draco

- Location of 10 Draconis (circled in red)

Observation data Epoch J2000 Equinox J2000
- Constellation: Draco
- Right ascension: 13^{h} 51^{m} 25.90451^{s}
- Declination: +64° 43′ 23.7510″
- Apparent magnitude (V): 4.52 - 4.67

Characteristics
- Evolutionary stage: AGB
- Spectral type: M3.5 III
- B−V color index: 1.572±0.010
- Variable type: LB:

Astrometry
Radial velocity (R_{v})	−12.26±0.17 km/s
Proper motion (μ)	RA: +14.144 mas/yr Dec.: +3.172 mas/yr
Parallax (π)	8.2082±0.2628 mas
Distance	400 ± 10 ly (122 ± 4 pc)
Absolute magnitude (M_{V})	−0.70

Details
Mass	0.93±0.06 M_{☉}
Radius	83.22+2.08 −2.16 R_{☉}
Luminosity	1,031±70 L_{☉}
Surface gravity (log g)	1.00 cgs
Temperature	3,584±35 K
Metallicity [Fe/H]	−0.24 dex
Age	10.24±1.40 Gyr

Other designations
- i Dra, 10 Dra, CU Dra, BD+65°963, FK5 511, HD 121130, HIP 67627, HR 5226, SAO 16199

Database references
SIMBAD	data

10 Draconis is a single star in the northern circumpolar constellation of Draco. It was a latter designation of 87 Ursae Majoris, and is visible to the naked eye with an apparent visual magnitude of about 4.6. The distance to this star, as determined from its annual parallax shift of 8.2 mas, is around 400 light years. It is moving closer with a heliocentric radial velocity of −12 km/s, and is expected to come to within 84 ly in about 8.6 million years.

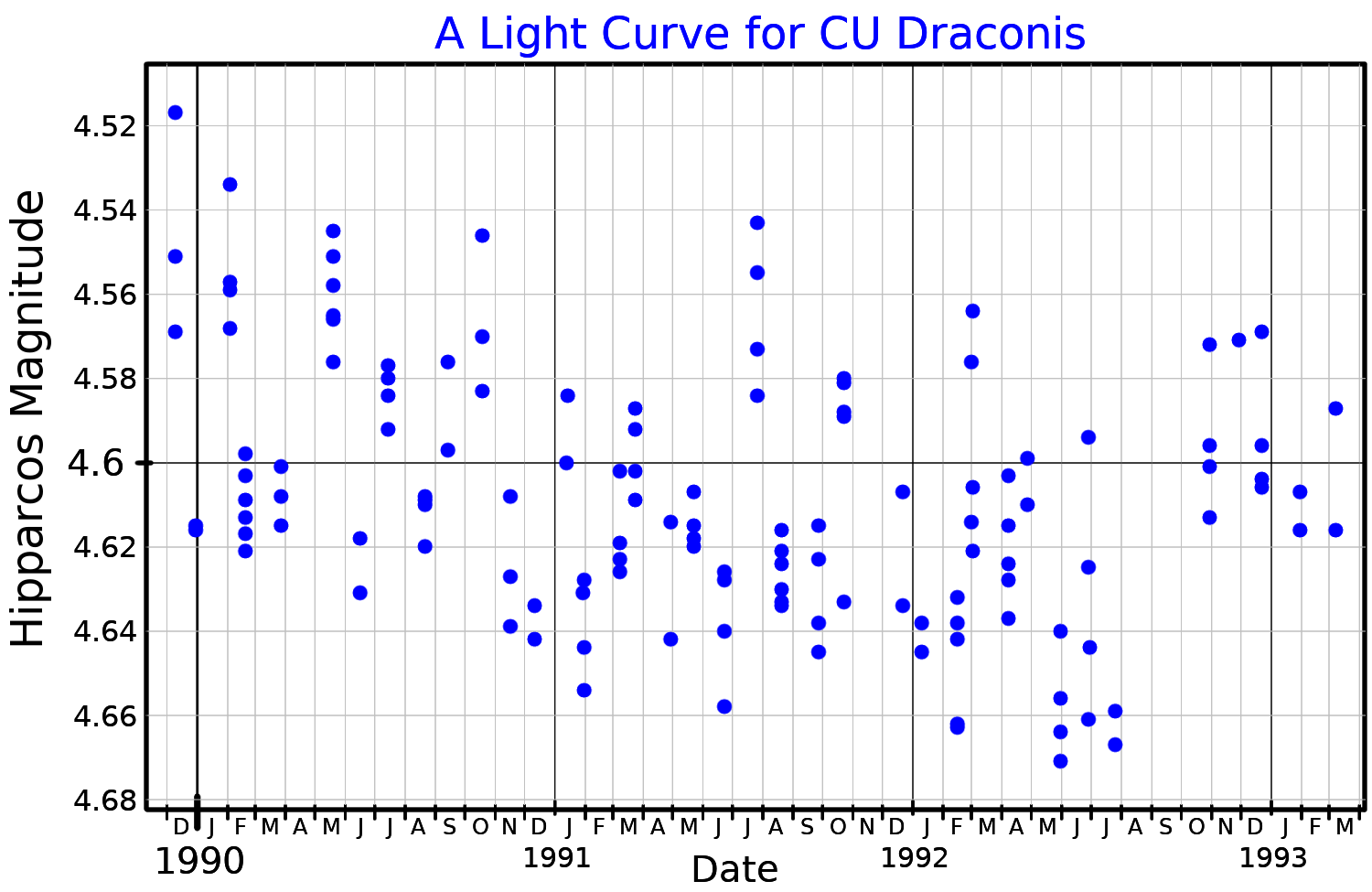
A light curve for CU Draconis, plotted from Hipparcos data

Estimated to be around 10 billion years old, this is an aging red giant star with a stellar classification of M3.5 III. It is a periodic variable with a frequency of 11.98912 cycles per day and an amplitude of 0.0254 in magnitude. The spectrum does not show evidence of s-process enhancement. 10 Dra has 93% of the mass of the Sun but has expanded to about 83 times the Sun's radius. The star is radiating over 1,000 times the Sun's luminosity from its enlarged photosphere at an effective temperature of 3,584 K.
