= List of exoplanets discovered in 2010 =

This is a List of exoplanets discovered in 2010.

For exoplanets detected only by radial velocity, the mass value is actually a lower limit. (See Minimum mass for more information)

Name	Mass (M_{J})	Radius (R_{J})	Period (days)	Semi-major axis (AU)	Temp. (K)	Discovery method	Distance (ly)	Host star mass (M_{☉})	Host star temp. (K)	Remarks
2MASS J04414489+2301513 b	7.5			15.0		imaging	456.63	0.02		
24 Sextantis b	1.99		452.8	1.333		radial vel.	235.53	1.54	5098	
24 Sextantis c	0.86		883	2.08		radial vel.	235.53	1.54	5098	
Alpha Arietis b	1.8		380.8	1.2		radial vel.	65.92	1.5	4553	Host star also known as Hamal
CoRoT-8b	0.22	0.57	6.21229	0.063	870	transit	1239	0.88	5080	
CoRoT-10b	2.75	0.97	13.2406	0.1055	600	transit	1125	0.89	5075	
CoRoT-11b	2.33	1.43	2.99433	0.0436	1657	transit	1827	1.27	6440	
CoRoT-12b	0.917	1.44	2.828042	0.04016	1442	transit	3751	1.08	5675	
CoRoT-13b	1.308	0.885	4.03519	0.051	1700	transit	3457	1.09	5945	
CoRoT-14b	7.6	1.09	1.51214	0.027	1952	transit	4371	1.13	6035	
Gliese 676 Ab	6.7		1056.8	1.82		radial vel.	52.28	0.73	3734	
Gliese 876 e	0.046		124.26	0.3343		radial vel.	15.26	0.32	3129	
Gliese 1148 b	0.30425		41.38	0.166		radial vel.	35.94	0.35	3264	
Gliese 3634 b	0.026		2.64561	0.0287		radial vel.	64.58	0.45	3685	
GSC 06214-00210 b	16.0	1.8		320	2300	imaging	472.94	0.9	4200	
HAT-P-14b	3.44	1.42	4.62767	0.0596	1624	transit	730.94	2.65	6600	Proper name Sissi
HAT-P-15b	1.94	1.06	10.8635	0.0965	904	transit	631.33	1.0	5568	Proper name Tryzub
HAT-P-16b	4.193	1.289	2.77596	0.0413	1626	transit	766.49	1.22	6158	
HAT-P-17b	0.58	1.05	10.33852	0.0882	792	transit	302.13	0.99	5246	
HAT-P-17c	3.4		5584	5.6		radial vel.	302.13	0.99	5246	
HAT-P-18b	0.197	0.995	5.508023	0.0559	852	transit	541.44	0.77	4803	
HAT-P-19b	0.292	1.132	4.008778	0.0466	1010	transit	701.26	0.84	4990	
HAT-P-20b	7.246	0.867	2.875317	0.0361	970	transit	228.32	0.76	4595	
HAT-P-21b	4.87	1.11	4.12448	0.0494	1283	transit	911.57	1.24	5588	Proper name Bambaruush
HAT-P-22b	2.47	1.15	3.21222	0.0414	1463	transit	267.33	1.13	5302	
HAT-P-23b	1.34	1.09	1.21288	0.0232	1951	transit	1202	0.58	5905	Proper name Jebus
HAT-P-24b	0.75	1.3	3.35524	0.04651	1637	transit	1371	1.37	6373	
HAT-P-25b	0.569	1.135	3.65281514	0.0466	1182	transit	988.12	1.01	5519	
HAT-P-26b	0.07	0.63	4.23452	0.0479	1001	transit	464.49	1.12	5079	
HD 1461 b	0.02026		5.77152	0.0634		radial vel.	76.55	1.02	5765	
BD-11 4672 b	0.6		1634±14	2.36±0.04		radial vel.	88.6	0.571	4475±100	
HD 1690 b	8.79		533	1.36		radial vel.	2509	1.86	4374	
HD 4313 b	8.79		533	1.36		radial vel.	438±2	1.86	4374	
HD 25171 b	0.95±0.1		1845±15	3.02±0.16		radial vel.	179.3±4.9	1.09±0.3	6160±65	
HD 217786 A b	13.0		1319	2.38		radial vel.	178.74	1.02	5966	Orbiting a primary star in binary system, planet is likely a low-mass brown dwarf
HD 8535 b	0.68		1313	2.45		radial vel.	171.24	1.13	6136	
HD 10180 c	0.0416		5.75969	0.06412		radial vel.	127.21	1.06	5911	
HD 10180 d	0.0378		16.357	0.12859		radial vel.	127.21	1.06	5911	
HD 10180 e	0.0805		49.748	0.2699		radial vel.	127.21	1.06	5911	
HD 10180 f	0.0722		122.744	0.4929		radial vel.	127.21	1.06	5911	
HD 10180 g	0.0732		604.67	1.427		radial vel.	127.21	1.06	5911	
HD 10180 h	0.2066		2205	3.381		radial vel.	127.21	1.06	5911	
HD 25171 b	0.915		1802.29	2.971		radial vel.	181.68	1.08	6125	
HD 28254 b	1.16		1116	2.15		radial vel.	178.41	1.06	5664	
HD 31253 b	0.62		466	1.26		radial vel.	189.96	1.7	6130	
HD 38283 b	0.4		363.2	1.02		radial vel.	124.27	1.37	5981	Proper name Yanyan
HD 43197 b	0.6		327.8	0.92		radial vel.	183.63	0.96	5508	Proper name Equiano
HD 44219 b	0.58		472.3	1.19		radial vel.	164.39	1.0	5752	
HD 86226 b	0.92		1695	2.84		radial vel.	149.19	1.06	5903	
HD 95089 b	1.26		464.4	1.36		radial vel.	448.35	1.54	4918	
HD 97658 b	0.03	0.21	9.4909	0.0796	757	radial vel.	70.39	0.89	5175	
HD 102365 b	0.05		122.1	0.46		radial vel.	30.3	0.85	5630	
HD 102956 b	0.96		6.4947	0.0807		radial vel.	398.97	1.66	4985	Proper name Isagel
HD 109246 b	0.86		68.27	0.33		radial vel.	221.7	1.2	5844	Proper name Fold
HD 113538 b	0.36		663.2	1.24		radial vel.	51.86	0.58	4462	
HD 113538 c	0.93		1818	2.44		radial vel.	51.86	0.58	4462	
HD 114783 c	0.611^{+0.056}_{−0.053}		4319^{+151}_{−130}			radial vel.	66.5±1.3	0.85±0.03	5135±44	
HD 129445 b	1.6		1840	2.9		radial vel.	220.39	0.99	5605	
HD 136418 b	2.14		464.3	1.29		radial vel.	344.07	1.48	4989	Proper name Awasis
HD 145457 b	2.23		176.3	0.76		radial vel.	443.0	1.23	4769	Proper name Chura
HD 152079 b	2.661		2918.92	4.187		radial vel.	287.39	1.15	5907	
HD 156668 b	0.013		4.6455	0.05		radial vel.	79.42	0.77	4850	
HD 164604 b	1.99792		641.472	1.331		radial vel.	128.54	0.77	4684	Proper name Caleuche
HD 175167 b	8.97		1290	2.4		radial vel.	232.33	1.37	5635	
HD 176051 b	1.5		1016	1.76		astrometry	49	1.07/0.71	6000/?	First planet discovered by astrometry, it is not known which star it orbits
HD 177830 c	0.15		110.9	0.5137		radial vel.	205.09	1.7	4901	
HD 180314 b	20.13		396.03	1.46		radial vel.	400.5	2.2	4924	
HD 180902 b	1.685		510.9	1.4		radial vel.	342.12	1.41	4961	
HD 181342 b	2.54		564.1	1.592		radial vel.	394.04	1.69	4945	Proper name Dopere
HD 200964 b	1.599		606.3	1.565		radial vel.	237.25	1.39	4982	
HD 200964 c	1.214		852.5	1.96		radial vel.	237.25	1.39	4982	
HD 204313 b	3.46		1920.1	3.07		radial vel.	156.1	1.03	5783	
HD 206610 b	2.036		673.2	1.74		radial vel.	482.01	1.55	4842	Proper name Naron
HD 212771 b	2.39		380.7	1.19		radial vel.	363.71	1.56	5003	Proper name Victoriapeak
HD 218566 b	0.2		225.7	0.69		radial vel.	94.1	0.76	4730	Proper name Ugarit
HIP 12961 b	0.36		57.435	0.25		radial vel.	76.29	0.69	3901	Proper name Aumatex
HIP 78530 b	23.0			740	2700	imaging	511.1	2.5	10500	
HR 8799 e	10.0	1.17	20815.6	16.4	1150	imaging	128.51	1.51	7400	
Kepler-8b	0.59	1.416	3.5224991	0.0474	1680	transit	3434	1.21	6213	
Kepler-9b	0.13655	0.74	19.23891	0.143		transit	2003	1.02	5774	
Kepler-9c	0.09408	0.721	38.9853	0.227		transit	2003	1.02	5774	
Kepler-9d		0.146	1.592851	0.0273	2026	transit	2003	1.02	5774	
Kepler-40b	2.2	1.17	6.87349	0.08	1620	transit	8807	1.48	6510	
Kepler-71b		1.11	3.90512	0.0477		transit	2609	0.95	5545	
MOA-2009-BLG-319Lb	0.16			2.4		microlensing	19900	0.38		
MOA-2009-BLG-387Lb	2.56		1982	1.82		microlensing	18600	0.19		
NN Serpentis c	7.33		5573.55	5.35		timing	1631	0.54	57000	
NN Serpentis d	2.3		2883.5	3.43		timing	1631	0.54	57000	
Qatar 1 b	1.294	1.143	1.4200242	0.02332	1532±219	transit	608.66	0.84	5013	
Ross 458 c	6.28536	1.22		1168		imaging	37.54	0.49	3621	Has the largest orbit for a circumbinary planet
SR 12 AB c	13.0			1100		imaging	366±18		3828	Circumbinary, already at the deuterium-burning mass limit and still accreting.
WASP-8b	2.54	1.13	8.15872	0.0801	950	transit	294.17	1.34	5600	
WASP-21b	0.3	1.07	4.322482	0.052	1340	transit	849.11	0.89	5800	Proper name Bendida
WASP-22b	0.67	1.23	3.53269	0.047	1502	transit	1045	1.46	6000	Proper name Koyopa'
WASP-23b	0.884	0.962	2.9444256	0.0376		transit	680.84	0.78	5150	
WASP-24b	1.24	1.38	2.34121	0.03651	1772	transit	1060	1.43	6075	
WASP-25b	0.44	1.07	3.76483	0.0473	1210	transit	693.76	0.67	5750	
WASP-26b	0.85	1.21	2.7566	0.03985	1650	transit	830.13	0.86	6034	
WASP-28b	0.907	1.213	3.40883	0.04469	1468	transit	1300	1.02	6150	, also rediscovered in 2014
WASP-29b	0.23	0.77	3.92273	0.0457	970	transit	286.44	0.77	4800	
WASP-31b	0.478	1.549	3.4059096	0.04659	1575	transit	1174	1.16	6302	
WASP-32b	2.63	0.96	2.71866	0.0394		transit	907.3	0.72	6140	Proper name Viculus
WASP-33b	2.093	1.593	1.21987	0.0239	2782	transit	399.1	1.5	7430	
WASP-34b	0.56	1.0	4.31768	0.0524	1250	transit	432.46	0.96	5700	Proper name Haik
WASP-36b	2.361	1.327	1.53736596	0.02677	1733	transit	1274	1.08	5959	
WASP-37b	1.8	1.16	3.577469	0.0446	1323^{+23}_{−15}	transit	1119	0.925±0.12	5800±150	Metal-poor host star
WASP-38b	3.44	1.23	6.87188	0.07522	1250	transit	446.1	1.76	6180	Proper name Iztok
WASP-41b	0.94	1.18	3.052404	0.04	1244	transit	590	0.93	5545	
HD 192310 b	0.053	~0.381	74.72	0.32		radial vel.	28.7	0.78	5069	

== Specific exoplanet lists ==
Lists of exoplanets

- List of directly imaged exoplanets
- List of exoplanet extremes
- List of exoplanet firsts
- List of exoplanets discovered by the Kepler space telescope
- List of exoplanets observed during Kepler's K2 mission
- List of exoplanets discovered by the TESS mission
- List of terrestrial exoplanet candidates for atmosphere detection
- List of hottest exoplanets
- List of coldest exoplanets
- List of multiplanetary systems
- List of circumbinary planets
- List of nearest exoplanets
- List of nearest terrestrial exoplanet candidates
- List of potentially habitable exoplanets
- List of proper names of exoplanets
- List of largest exoplanets
- List of smallest exoplanets
- List of transiting exoplanets
- List of exoplanets and planetary debris around giant stars
- List of exoplanets and planetary debris around white dwarfs
- List of extrasolar planetary collisions

=== Lists of exoplanets by year of discovery ===
- List of exoplanets discovered before 2000 (31)
- List of exoplanets discovered between 2000–2009 (376)
- List of exoplanets discovered in 2010 (109)
- List of exoplanets discovered in 2011 (178)
- List of exoplanets discovered in 2012 (149)
- List of exoplanets discovered in 2013 (149)
- List of exoplanets discovered in 2014 (869)
- List of exoplanets discovered in 2015 (144)
- List of exoplanets discovered in 2016 (1497)
- List of exoplanets discovered in 2017 (152)
- List of exoplanets discovered in 2018 (300)
- List of exoplanets discovered in 2019 (169)
- List of exoplanets discovered in 2020 (256)
- List of exoplanets discovered in 2021 (253)
- List of exoplanets discovered in 2022 (312)
- List of exoplanets discovered in 2023 (304)
- List of exoplanets discovered in 2024 (284)
- List of exoplanets discovered in 2025 (239)
- List of exoplanets discovered in 2026 (339)
