= HATNet Project =

Network of automated telescopes

The Hungarian Automated Telescope Network (HATNet) project is a network of six small fully automated "HAT" telescopes. The scientific goal of the project is to detect and characterize extrasolar planets using the transit method. This network is used also to find and follow bright variable stars. The network is maintained by the Center for Astrophysics | Harvard & Smithsonian.

The HAT acronym stands for Hungarian-made Automated Telescope, because it was developed by a small group of Hungarians who met through the Hungarian Astronomical Association. The project started in 1999 and has been fully operational since May 2001.

== Equipment ==
The prototype instrument, HAT-1 was built from a 180 mm focal length and 65 mm aperture Nikon telephoto lens and a Kodak KAF-0401E chip of 512 × 768, 9 μm pixels. The test period was from 2000 to 2001 at the Konkoly Observatory in Budapest.

HAT-1 was transported from Budapest to the Steward Observatory, Kitt Peak, Arizona, USA, in January 2001. The transportation caused serious damage to the equipment.

Later built telescopes use Canon 11 cm diameter f/1.8L lenses for a wide-field of 8°×8°. It is a fully automated instrument with 2K x 2K Charge-coupled device (CCD) sensors. One HAT instrument operates at the Wise Observatory.

HAT is controlled by a single Linux PC without human supervision. Data are stored in a MySQL database.

=== HAT-South ===
From 2009, three other locations joined the HATNet with telescopes of completely new design. The telescopes are deployed to Australia, Namibia and Chile. Each system has eight (2*4) joint-mounted, quasi-parallel Takahashi Epsilon (180 mm diameter, f/2.8) astrographs with Apogee 4k*4k CCDs with overlapping fields of view. The processing computers are Xenomai-based industrial PCs with 10 TB of storage.

== Participants in the project ==
HAT-1 was developed during the undergraduate (and also the first year graduate) studies of Gáspár Bakos (Eötvös Loránd University, now at Princeton University) and at Konkoly Observatory (Budapest), under the supervision of Dr. Géza Kovács. In the development József Lázár, István Papp and Pál Sári also played an important role.

More than 100 people have contributed altogether to the seventy planet discovery papers published or submitted by the project as of Feb 2020. Gáspár Bakos, István Papp, József Lázár, Pál Sári, have contributed to all of the planet discoveries by HAT. Other participants who have contributed to at least 10 discovery papers include: Joel Hartman (62 papers, Princeton), Robert Noyes (55, CfA), David Latham (44, CfA), Zoltán Csubry (43, Princeton), Kaloyan Penev (43, UT Dallas), Géza Kovács (42, Konkoly Observatory), Guillermo Torres (40, CfA), Geoffrey Marcy (38, UC Berkeley), Gilbert Esquerdo (37, CfA), Waqas Bhatti (34, Princeton), Miguel de Val-Borro (34, Goddard Space Flight Center), Lars Buchhave (33, Niels Bohr Institute), Daniel Bayliss (32, University of Warwick), Dimitar Sasselov (32, CfA), Bence Béky (31, CfA), Andrew Howard (31, Caltech), Debra Fischer (30, Yale University), George Zhou (30, CfA), Néstor Espinoza (29, STSCI), Andrés Jordán (29, Adolfo Ibáñez University), Robert Stefanik (29, CfA), Rafael Brahm (28, Pontifical Catholic University of Chile), Thomas Henning (28, MPIA), Luigi Mancini (28, University of Rome Tor Vergata), Markus Rabus (28, Las Cumbres Observatory), Vincent Suc (28, Pontifical Catholic University of Chile), John Johnson (27, CfA), R. Paul Butler (20, Carnegie Institution for Science), Simona Ciceri (19, MPIA), Brian Schmidt (19, ANU), Joao Bento (17, ANU), Thiam-Guan Tan (17, Perth Exoplanet Survey Telescope), Mark Everett (16, NOAO), Sam Quinn (16, CfA), Avi Shporer (16, MIT), Allyson Bieryla (14, CfA), Bun'ei Sato (14, Tokyo Institute of Technology), B.J. Fulton (12, Caltech), Howard Isaacson (12, UC Berkeley), András Pál (12, CfA), Brigitta Sipőcz (12, University of Hertfordshire), Támás Szkelenár (12), Chris Tinney (12, University of New South Wales), Duncan Wright (11, Australian Astronomical Observatory), Jeffrey Crane (10, Carnegie Institution for Science), Emilio Falco (10, CfA), Paula Sarkis (10, MPIA), and Stephen Shectman (10, Carnegie Institution for Science).

== Planets discovered ==
One-hundred-thirty-four extrasolar planets have been discovered so far by the HAT surveys, including a handful of planets that were independently discovered by other groups as well (particularly the WASP survey). Sixty-three of these were found by the northern HATNet project, and seventy-one by the southern HATSouth project. All have been discovered using the transit method. In addition, a few additional planetary companions to the transiting planets were discovered through radial velocity follow-up observations, including HAT-P-13c, which was the first outer planetary or brown-dwarf companion confirmed with a well-characterised orbit for a system with a transiting planet

Light green rows indicate that the planet orbits one of the stars in a binary star system.

=== North ===
Star	Constellation	Right ascension	Declination	App. mag.	Distance (ly)	Spectral type	Planet	Mass (M_{J})	Radius (R_{J})	Orbital period (d)	Semimajor axis (AU)	Orbital eccentricity	Inclination (°)	Discovery year	Ref
ADS 16402 B	Lacerta	22^{h} 57^{m} 47^{s}	+38° 40′ 30″	10.4	453	G0V	HAT-P-1b	0.524	1.225	4.4652934	0.0553	<0.067	86.28	2006
Hunor	Hercules	16^{h} 20^{m} 36^{s}	+41° 02′ 53″	8.71	440	F8	Magor	8.65	0.951	5.63341	0.0677	0.5163	90	2007
Dombay	Ursa Major	13^{h} 44^{m} 23^{s}	+48° 01′ 43″	11.86	457	K	Teberda	0.599	0.890	2.899703	0.03894	0	87.24	2007
BD+36°2593	Boötes	15^{h} 19^{m} 58^{s}	+36° 13′ 47″	11.2	1010	F	HAT-P-4b	0.68	1.27	3.056536	0.0446	0	89.9	2007
Chasoň	Lyra	18^{h} 17^{m} 37^{s}	+36° 37′ 16″	12	1110	G	Kráľomoc	1.06	1.26	2.788491	0.04075	0	86.75	2007
Sterrennacht	Andromeda	23^{h} 39^{m} 06^{s}	+42° 27′ 58″	10.5	650	F	Nachtwacht	1.057	1.33	3.852985	0.05235	0	85.51	2007
GSC 03547-01402	Cygnus	19^{h} 28^{m} 59^{s}	+47° 58′ 10″	10.5	1044	F8	HAT-P-7b	1.776	1.363	2.2047299	0.0377	0	85.7	2008
GSC 02757-01152	Pegasus	22^{h} 52^{m} 10^{s}	+35° 26′ 50″	10.17	750	F	HAT-P-8b	1.52	1.5	3.07632	0.0487	0	87.5	2008
Tevel	Auriga	07^{h} 20^{m} 40^{s}	+37° 08′ 26″	12.34	1560	F	Alef	0.78	1.4	3.92289	0.053	0	86.5	2008
WASP-11/HAT-P-10	Perseus	03^{h} 09^{m} 29^{s}	+30° 40′ 25″	11.89	408	K3V	WASP-11b/HAT-P-10b	0.460	1.045	3.7224690	0.0439	0	88.5	2008
GSC 03561-02092	Cygnus	19^{h} 50^{m} 50^{s}	+48° 04′ 51″	9.59	123.5	K4	HAT-P-11b	0.081	0.422	4.8878162	0.053	0.198	88.5	2009
Komondor	Canes Venatici	13^{h} 57^{m} 34^{s}	+43° 29′ 37″	12.84	465	K4	Puli	0.211	0.959	3.2130598	0.0384	0	89.0	2009
GSC 3416-00543	Ursa Major	08^{h} 39^{m} 31^{s}	+47° 21′ 07″	10.429	698	G4	HAT-P-13b	0.851	1.28	2.9162595	0.0426	0.021	83.4	2009
GSC 3416-00543	Ursa Major	08^{h} 39^{m} 31^{s}	+47° 21′ 07″	10.429	698	G4	HAT-P-13c	>15.2		428.5	1.186	0.691		2009
Franz	Hercules	17^{h} 20^{m} 28^{s}	+38° 14′ 32″	9.98	670	F	Sissi	1.386	1.468	4.6267669	0.0606	0.107	83.5	2010
Berehynia	Perseus	04^{h} 25^{m} 33.65^{s}	+39° 20′ 44.2″	12.16	190	G5	Tryzub	1.946	1.072	10.863502	0.0964	0.19	89.1	2010
GSC 2792-01700	Andromeda	00^{h} 38^{m} 17.56^{s}	+42° 27′ 47.2″	10.8	235	F8	HAT-P-16b	4.193	1.289	2.77596	0.0413	0.036	86.6	2010
HAT-P-17	Cygnus	21^{h} 38^{m} 09^{s}	+30° 29′ 19″	10.54	293.5	K	HAT-P-17b	0.53	1.01	10.338523	0.0882	0.346	89.2	2010
HAT-P-17	Cygnus	21^{h} 38^{m} 09^{s}	+30° 29′ 19″	10.54	293.5	K	HAT-P-17c	1.4		1797	2.75	0.1		2010
HAT-P-18	Hercules	17^{h} 05^{m} 24^{s}	+33° 00′ 45″	12.76	541	K	HAT-P-18b	0.197	0.995	5.508023	0.0559	0.084	88.8	2010
HAT-P-19	Andromeda	00^{h} 38^{m} 04^{s}	+34° 42′ 42″	12.9	701	K	HAT-P-19b	0.292	1.132	4.008778	0.0466	0.067	88.2	2010
HAT-P-20	Gemini	07^{h} 27^{m} 40^{s}	+24° 20′ 11″	11.34	228	K7	HAT-P-20b	7.246	0.867	2.875317	0.0361	0.015	86.8	2010
Mazalaai	Ursa Major	11^{h} 25^{m} 06^{s}	+41° 01′ 41″	11.46	228	G3	Bambaruush	4.063	1.024	4.124461	0.0494	0.228	87.2	2010
HAT-P-22	Ursa Major	10^{h} 22^{m} 44^{s}	+50° 07′ 42″	9.73	267	G5	HAT-P-22b	2.147	1.08	3.21222	0.0414	0.016	86.9	2010
Moriah	Delphinus	20^{h} 24^{m} 30^{s}	+16° 45′ 44″	11.94	1282	G5	Jebus	2.09	1.368	1.212884	0.0232	0.106	85.1	2010
HAT-P-24	Gemini	07^{h} 15^{m} 18^{s}	+14° 15′ 44″	11.818	998	F8	HAT-P-24b	0.681	1.243	3.3552464	0.0465	0.067	88.6	2010
HAT-P-25	Aries	03^{h} 13^{m} 45^{s}	+25° 11′ 51″	13.19	969	G5	HAT-P-25b	0.567	1.19	3.652836	0.0466	0.032	87.6	2010
Guahayona	Virgo	14^{h} 12^{m} 37.55^{s}	+04° 03′ 36.13″	11.74	437	K1	Guataubá	0.059	0.565	4.234516	0.0479	0.124	88.6	2010
HAT-P-27	Virgo	14^{h} 51^{m} 04^{s}	+05° 56′ 50″	12.21	665	G8	HAT-P-27b	0.66	1.038	3.039586	0.0403	0.078	84.7	2011
HAT-P-28	Andromeda	00^{h} 52^{m} 00^{s}	+34° 43′ 42″	13.03	1288	G3	HAT-P-28b	0.626	1.212	3.257215	0.0434	0.051	88	2011
Muspelheim	Perseus	02^{h} 12^{m} 31^{s}	+51° 46′ 44″	11.9	1050	F8	Surt	0.778	1.107	5.72318	0.0667	0.095	87.1	2011
HAT-P-30	Draco	08^{h} 15^{m} 48^{s}	+05° 50′ 12″	10.42	629	F	HAT-P-30b	0.711	1.34	2.810595	0.0419	0.035	83.6	2011
HAT-P-31	Cancer	08^{h} 06^{m} 09^{s}	+26° 25′ 36″	11.66	1155	F/G	HAT-P-31b	2.171	1.07	5.005425	0.055	0.245	87.1	2011
HAT-P-32	Andromeda	02^{h} 01^{m} 10^{s}	+46° 41′ 16″	11.29	1044	F/G	HAT-P-32b	0.941	2.037	2.150009	0.0344	0.163	88.7	2011
HAT-P-33	Gemini	07^{h} 32^{m} 44^{s}	+33° 50′ 06″	11.89	1367	F	HAT-P-33b	0.763	1.827	3.474474	0.0503	0.148	86.7	2011
Sansuna	Sagitta	20^{h} 12^{m} 47^{s}	+18° 06′ 18″	10.16	838	F8	Ġgantija	3.328	1.107	5.452654	0.0677	0.441	87.1	2012
HAT-P-35	Hydra	08^{h} 13^{m} 00^{s}	+04° 47′ 13″	12.46	1745	F or G	HAT-P-35b	1.054	1.332	3.646706	0.0498	0.025	87.3	2012
Tuiren	Canes Venatici	12^{h} 33^{m} 03^{s}	+44° 54′ 55″	12.26	1034	F or G	Bran	1.832	1.264	1.327347	0.0238	0.063	86	2012
HAT-P-37	Draco	18^{h} 57^{m} 11 ^{s}	+51° 16′ 09″	13.23	1341	F or G	HAT-P-37b	1.169	1.178	2.797436	0.0379	0.058	86.9	2012
Horna	Triangulum	02^{h} 21^{m} 32^{s}	+32° 14′ 47″	12.56	812	G	Hiisi	0.267	0.825	4.640382	0.0523	0.067	88.3	2012
HAT-P-39	Gemini	07^{h} 35^{m} 02.0^{s}	+17° 49′ 48″	11.42	812	F	HAT-P-39b	0.599	1.571	3.54387	0.0509	-	87	2012
Taika	Lacerta	22^{h} 22^{m} 03.0^{s}	+45° 27′ 27″	11.7	1634	F	Vytis	0.615	1.73	4.45724	0.0608	-	88.3	2012
HAT-P-41	Aquila	19^{h} 49^{m} 17.0^{s}	+04° 40′ 21″	11.09	1014	F	HAT-P-41b	0.812	1.529	2.69405	0.0424	-	87.9	2012
Lerna	Hydra	09^{h} 01^{m} 23.0^{s}	+06° 05′ 50″	12.17	1458	F or G	Iolaus	0.975	1.277	4.64188	0.0575	-	85.9	2012
HAT-P-43	Cancer	08^{h} 35^{m} 42.0^{s}	+10° 12′ 24″	13.36	1771	F or G	HAT-P-43b	0.66	1.283	3.33269	0.0443	-	88.7	2012
HAT-P-44	Cassiopeia	00^{h} 56^{m} 50.3^{s}	+47° 00′ 52″	13.21	1220	G/K	HAT-P-44b	0.392	1.28	4.30122	0.0507	0.072	89	2013
HAT-P-44	Cassiopeia	00^{h} 56^{m} 50.3^{s}	+47° 00′ 52″	13.21	1220	G/K	HAT-P-44c	1.6	-	219.9	0.699	-	-	2013
HAT-P-45	Cetus	00^{h} 33^{m} 09.9^{s}	−03° 22′ 51″	12.79	995	F7	HAT-P-45b	0.892	1.426	3.12899	0.0452	0.049	87.8	2013
HAT-P-46	Cetus	00^{h} 32^{m} 07.1^{s}	−02° 58′ 15″	11.94	965	F9	HAT-P-46b	0.493	1.284	4.46313	0.0577	0.123	85.5	2013
HAT-P-46	Cetus	00^{h} 32^{m} 07.1^{s}	−02° 58′ 15″	11.94	965	F9	HAT-P-46c	2	-	77.7	0.387	-	-	2013
HAT-P-47	Aries	02^{h} 33^{m} 14.0^{s}	+30° 21′ 38″	10.6	870	F4	HAT-P-47b	0.206	1.313	4.732182	0.0615	-	84.8	2016
HAT-P-48	Aries	02^{h} 57^{m} 53.0^{s}	+30° 37′ 33″	12.16	990	G0	HAT-P-48b	0.168	1.131	4.40865	0.0543	-	86.8	2016
HAT-P-49	Vulpecula	20^{h} 21^{m} 45.928^{s}	+26° 41′ 33.60″	10.3	1050	F	HAT-P-49b	1.73	1.41	2.6915	0.0438	0	86.2	2014
HAT-P-50	Canis Minor	07^{h} 52^{m} 15.20^{s}	12° 08′ 21.9″	11.762	1,620	F8	HAT-P-50b	1.350	1.288	3.1220109	0.04530	<0.115	83.65	2015
HAT-P-51	Pisces	01^{h} 24^{m} 15.66^{s}	32° 48′ 38.8″	13.440	1,500	G6	HAT-P-51b	0.309	1.293	4.2180278	0.05069	<0.123	88.48	2015
HAT-P-52	Aries	02^{h} 50^{m} 53.20^{s}	29° 01′ 20.6″	14.068	1,260	K0	HAT-P-52b	0.818	1.009	2.7535953	0.03694	<0.047	87.02	2015
HAT-P-53	Andromeda	01^{h} 27^{m} 29.05^{s}	38° 58′ 05.3″	13.73	2,350	G0	HAT-P-53b	1.484	1.318	1.9616241	0.03159	<0.134	86.2	2015
HAT-P-54	Gemini	06^{h} 39^{m} 35.53^{s}	25° 28′ 57.1″	13.505	443	Late K	HAT-P-54b	0.760	0.944	3.7998	0.04117	-	87.04	2015
HAT-P-55	Hercules	17^{h} 37^{m} 05.52^{s}	25° 43′ 52.2″	13.207	1,600	G2	HAT-P-55b	0.582	1.182	3.5852467	0.04604	<0.139	87.70	2015
HAT-P-56	Gemini	06^{h} 43^{m} 23.52^{s}	27° 15′ 8.2″	10.908	1,013	F	HAT-P-56b	2.18	1.466	2.7908327	0.04230	<0.246	82.13	2015
HAT-P-57	Ophiuchus	18^{h} 18^{m} 58.32^{s}	10° 35′ 50.3″	10.465	990	A8	HAT-P-57b	<1.85	1.413	2.4652950	0.0406	-	88.26	2015
HAT-P-65	Equuleus	21^{h} 03^{m} 37.44^{s}	11° 59′ 21.9″	13.145	2,740	G2	HAT-P-65b	0.527	1.89	2.6054552	0.03951	<0.304	84.2	2016
HAT-P-66	Ursa Major	10^{h} 02^{m} 17.52^{s}	53° 57′ 3.1″	12.993	3,020	G0	HAT-P-66b	0.783	1.59	2.9720860	0.04363	<0.090	86.2	2016
HAT-P-67	Hercules	17^{h} 06^{m} 26.5611^{s}	44° 46′ 37.072″	10.069	1,000	F	HAT-P-67b	0.34	2.085	4.81010	0.06505	0	88.8	2017
HAT-P-69	Hydra	08^{h} 42^{m} 01.353^{s}	+03° 42′ 38.038″	9.8	1,122	A	HAT-P-69b	3.58	1.676	4.7869491	0.06555	0	87.19	2019
HAT-P-70	Orion	04^{h} 58^{m} 12.560^{s}	+09° 59′ 52.726″	9.5	1,070	A	HAT-P-70b	<6.78	1.87	2.74432452	0.04739	0	96.50	2019
WASP-194/HAT-P-71	Cygnus	19^{h} 41^{m} 33.05^{s}	+56° 13′ 04.1″	12.0	1,555.21	F6IV-V	WASP-194b/HAT-P-71b	1.174	1.381	3.183387	0.047	0	83.23	2021

=== South ===
Star	Constellation	Right ascension	Declination	App. mag.	Distance (ly)	Spectral type	Planet	Mass (M_{J})	Radius (R_{J})	Orbital period (d)	Semimajor axis (AU)	Orbital eccentricity	Inclination (°)	Disc. year	Ref
HATS-1	Crater	11^{h} 32^{m} 06.08^{s}	−23° 21′ 170″	12.5	988.253824	G	HATS-1b	1.855	1.302	3.446459	0.0444	0.120	85.6	2012
HATS-2	Crater	11^{h} 46^{m} 57.38^{s}	−22° 33′ 46.8″	13.562	1174.16296	K	HATS-2b	1.345	1.168	1.354133	0.0230	0	87.2	2013
HATS-3	Capricornus	20^{h} 49^{m} 49.79^{s}	−24° 25′ 43.7″	11.44	1477.48839	F	HATS-3b	1.071	1.381	3.547850	0.0485	0	86.20	2013
HATS-4	Canis Major	06^{h} 16^{m} 26.90^{s}	−22° 32′ 48.8″	13.46	1369.85679	G	HATS-4b	1.323	1.020	2.516729	0.0362	0.013	88.5	2014
HATS-5	Eridanus	04^{h} 28^{m} 53.49^{s}	−21° 28′ 54.9″	12.6	838.221891	F8	HATS-5b	0.237	0.912	4.763387	0.0542	<0.019	89.3	2014
HATS-6	Lepus	05^{h} 52^{m} 35.23^{s}	−19° 01′ 54.0″	15.2	484.016065	M1V	HATS-6b	0.319	0.998	3.3252725	0.03623	0	88.21	2014
HATS-7	Virgo	13^{h} 55^{m} 25.68^{s}	−21° 12′ 27.7″	13.340	838.221891	K2	HATS-7b	0.120	0.563	3.1853150	0.04012	<0.170	87.92	2015
HATS-8	Sagittarius	19^{h} 39^{m} 46.02^{s}	−25° 44′ 53.9″	14.03	2703.83637	G	HATS-8b	0.138	0.873	3.583893	0.04667	<0.376	87.8	2015
HATS-9	Sagittarius	19^{h} 23^{m} 14.42^{s}	−20° 09′ 58.7″	13.3	2028.69267	G	HATS-9b	0.816	1.1724	1.9153	0.03048	<0.129	86.5	2015
HATS-10	Sagittarius	19^{h} 37^{m} 13.64^{s}	−22° 12′ 16.1″	13.1	1617.73563	G	HATS-10b	0.526	0.9690	3.3128460	0.04491	<0.501	87.79	2015
HATS-11	Sagittarius	19^{h} 17^{m} 36.18^{s}	−22° 23′ 23.7″	14.018	2954.97678	G0	HATS-11b	0.83	1.487	3.6191634	0.04614	<0.340	88.31	2016
HATS-12	Sagittarius	19^{h} 16^{m} 48.57^{s}	−19° 21′ 21.3″	12.756	3199.59407	F	HATS-12b	2.39	1.384	3.142833	0.04795	<0.085	82.27	2016
HATS-13	Capricornus	21^{h} 07^{m} 50.75^{s}	−26° 05′ 48.0″	13.887	1552.50436	G5	HATS-13b	0.543	1.212	3.0440499	0.04057	<0.181	88.55	2015
HATS-14	Capricornus	20^{h} 52^{m} 51.71^{s}	−25° 41′ 14.4″	13.79	1673.18222	G8	HATS-14b	1.071	1.039	2.7667641	0.03815	<0.142	88.83	2015
HATS-15	Capricornus	20^{h} 44^{m} 22.20^{s}	−19° 26′ 15.0″	14.774	2247.21744	G9V	HATS-15b	2.17	1.105	1.74748753	0.02712	<0.126	87.13	2016
HATS-16	Sculptor	23^{h} 54^{m} 14.09^{s}	−30° 00′ 46.8″	13.834	2247.21744	G3V	HATS-16b	3.27	1.30	2.686502	0.03744	<0	83.53	2016
HATS-17	Centaurus	12^{h} 48^{m} 45.55^{s}	−47° 36′ 49.3″	12.39	1105.67012	G	HATS-17b	1.338	0.777	16.254611	0.1308	<0.070	89.08	2016
HATS-18	Hydra	11^{h} 35^{m} 49.92^{s}	−29° 09′ 21.6″	14.067	2103.70864	G	HATS-18b	1.980	1.337	0.83784340	0.01761	<0.166	85.5	2016
HATS-19	Antlia	09^{h} 49^{m} 38.0^{s}	−33° 13′ 07″	13.0	2544.01975	G0	HATS-19b	0.427	1.66	4.56967	0.0589	0.3	86.6	2016
HATS-20	Centaurus	13^{h} 12^{m} 32.0^{s}	−45° 35′ 26″	13.77	1480.74995	G9V	HATS-20b	0.273	0.776	3.7993	0.04619	<0.50	87.16	2016
HATS-21	Pavo	18^{h} 40^{m} 44.0^{s}	−58° 27′ 33″	12.2	932.80724	G4V	HATS-21b	0.332	1.123	3.5544	0.04676	0	85.04	2016
HATS-22	Hydra	11^{h} 36^{m} 02.33^{s}	−29° 32′ 35.9″	13.455	678.079109	K2V	HATS-22b	0.9530	2.74	4.7228124	0.05025	<0.0790	87.96	2016
HATS-23	Telescopium	19^{h} 05^{m} 28.0^{s}	−50° 04′ 03″	13.9	2,440	G2V	HATS-23b	1.47	1.86	2.1605156	0.03397	<0.114	81.02	2016
HATS-24	Pavo	17^{h} 55^{m} 34.0^{s}	−61° 44′ 50″	12.8	1,700	F7V	HATS-24b	2.44	1.487	1.3484954	0.02547	<0.24	86.6	2016
HATS-25	Hydra	13^{h} 51^{m} 37.8^{s}	−23° 46′ 52″	13.1	1,520	G	HATS-25b	0.613	1.26	4.2986432	0.05163	<0.088	86.93	2016
HATS-26	Antlia	09^{h} 39^{m} 42.4^{s}	−28° 35′ 08″	12.955	2,960	F	HATS-26b	0.65	1.75	3.3023881	0.04735	<0.122	86.2	2016
HATS-27	Centaurus	12^{h} 54^{m} 12.6^{s}	−46° 35′ 16″	12.8	2,700	F	HATS-27b	0.53	1.5	4.637038	0.0611	<0.29	87.3	2016
HATS-28	Telescopium	18^{h} 57^{m} 36.0^{s}	−49° 08′ 18″	-	1,700	G	HATS-28b	0.672	1.194	3.1810781	0.04131	<0.101	86.17	2016
HATS-29	Vela	09^{h} 00^{m} 23.0^{s}	−54° 53′ 36″	12.6	1,140	G	HATS-29b	0.653	1.251	4.6058749	0.05475	<0.079	87.37	2016
HATS-30	Tucana	00^{h} 22^{m} 28.5^{s}	−59° 56′ 33″	12.192	1,110	G0V	HATS-30b	0.706	1.175	3.1743516	0.04354	<0.048	86.84	2016
HATS-31	Hydra	12^{h} 46^{m} 49.0^{s}	−24° 25′ 39″	13.1	2,840	F/G	HATS-31b	0.88	1.64	3.37796	0.0478	<0.233	85.0	2016
HATS-32	Aquarius	23^{h} 04^{m} 18.0^{s}	−21° 16′ 19″	14.38	2,740	G3V	HATS-32b	0.92	1.249	2.8126548	0.04024	<0.471	87.1	2016
HATS-33	Telescopium	19^{h} 38^{m} 32.0^{s}	−55° 19′ 48″	11.9	1,160	G4V	HATS-33b	1.192	1.23	2.5495551	0.03727	<0.08	87.62	2016
HATS-34	Tucana	00^{h} 03^{m} 06.0^{s}	−62° 28′ 10″	13.85	1,740	G7V	HATS-34b	0.941	1.43	2.1061607	0.03166	0.0	82.28	2016
HATS-35	Pavo	19^{h} 46^{m} 45.0^{s}	−63° 33′ 56″	12.56	1,820	F7V	HATS-35b	1.222	1.464	1.8209933	0.03199	0.0	86.9	2016
HATS-36	Sagittarius	19^{h} 25^{m} 54.8^{s}	−23° 12′ 10″	14.386	3,190	G0V	HATS-36b	2.79	1.263	4.1752379	0.0529	<0.294	87.57	2017
HATS-37							HATS-37b
HATS-38							HATS-38b
HATS-39	Puppis	07^{h} 29^{m} 41.0^{s}	−29° 56′ 16″	12.75	2,520	F5V	HATS-39b	0.63	1.57	4.5776348	0.06	<0.275	84.98	2018
HATS-40	Canis Major	06^{h} 42^{m} 17.0^{s}	−29° 46′ 37″	13.4	4,670	F5V	HATS-40b	1.59	1.58	3.2642736	0.04997	<0.312	85.8	2018
HATS-41	Canis Major	06^{h} 54^{m} 04.0^{s}	−27° 03′ 01″	12.681	2,600	F6V	HATS-41b	9.7	1.33	4.193649	0.0583	0.38	80.4	2018
HATS-42	Puppis	07^{h} 13^{m} 48.0^{s}	−33° 26′ 14″	13.6	3,070	F9V	HATS-42b	1.88	1.4	2.292102	0.03689	<0.229	85.1	2018
HATS-43	Columba	05^{h} 22^{m} 09.2^{s}	−30° 58′ 15″	13.593	1,110	K1.5V	HATS-43b	0.261	1.18	4.3888497	0.04944	0.173	89.24	2017
HATS-44	Columba	05^{h} 37^{m} 18.4^{s}	−27° 58′ 21″	14.428	1,510	K2V	HATS-44b	0.56	1.067	2.7439004	0.03649	<0.279	84.65	2017
HATS-45	Canis Major	06^{h} 47^{m} 58.6^{s}	−21° 54′ 38″	13.307	2,670	F5V	HATS-45b	0.7	1.286	4.1876244	0.05511	<0.24	85.61	2017
HATS-46	Phoenix	00^{h} 26^{m} 48.6^{s}	−56° 18′ 58″	13.634	1,460	G8V	HATS-46b	0.173	0.903	4.7423729	0.05367	<0.559	87.32	2017
HATS-47	Telescopium	19^{h} 09^{m} 56.0^{s}	−49° 39′ 54″	14.8	984	K4.5V	HATS-47b	0.369+0.031 −0.021	1.117±0.014	3.9228038	0.04269	<0.088	87.08	2020
HATS-48A	Pavo	19^{h} 14^{m} 41.0^{s}	−59° 34′ 46″	14.3	866	K4.5V	HATS-48Ab	0.243+0.022 −0.030	0.800±0.015	3.1316666	0.03769	<0.162	89.58	2020
HATS-49	Phoenix	00^{h} 26^{m} 27.0^{s}	−56° 20′ 40″		1,059	K5V	HATS-49b	0.353+0.038 −0.027	0.765±0.013	4.1480467	0.04515	<0.071	88.27	2020
HATS-50	Sagittarius	20^{h} 01^{m} 43.0^{s}	−26° 04′ 39″	14.0	2,339	G0V	HATS-50b	0.39+0.1 −0.1	1.13+0.075 −0.075	3.8297015	0.05046	<0.516	87.54	2017
HATS-51	Canis Major	06^{h} 51^{m} 23.0^{s}	−29° 03′ 31″	12.5	1,559	G2V	HATS-51b	0.768+0.045 −0.045	1.41+0.19 −0.19	3.3488702	0.04639	<0.33	87.1	2017
HATS-52	Pyxis	09^{h} 20^{m} 21.0^{s}	−31° 16′ 10″	13.7	2,058	F9.5V	HATS-52b	2.24+0.15 −0.15	1.382+0.086 −0.086	1.3665436	0.02498	<0.256	84.7	2017
HATS-53	Hydra	11^{h} 46^{m} 31.0^{s}	−33° 51′ 36″	13.8	1,999	G3V	HATS-53b	0.595+0.089 −0.089	1.34+0.056 −0.056	3.8537768	0.04753	<0.33	88.79	2017
HATS-54	Centaurus	13^{h} 22^{m} 32.0^{s}	−44° 41′ 20″	13.9	2,508	G2V	HATS-54b	0.76+0.1 −0.1	1.067+0.052 −0.052	2.5441828	0.03763	<0.126	83.08	2018
HATS-55	Puppis	07^{h} 37^{m} 08.0^{s}	−32° 45′ 20″		2,034	F8V	HATS-55b	0.921+0.76 −0.76	1.251+0.026 −0.026	4.2042001	0.05412	<0.092	86.32	2018
HATS-56	Centaurus	12^{h} 00^{m} 40.0^{s}	−45° 47′ 58″	11.6	1,882	F5V	HATS-56b	0.602+0.035 −0.035	1.688+0.039 −0.055	4.324799	0.06043	<0.019	83.29	2018
HATS-57	Eridanus	04^{h} 03^{m} 48.0^{s}	−19° 03′ 24″	12.3	913	G6V	HATS-57b	3.147+0.073 −0.073	1.13+0.028 −0.028	2.350621	0.03493	<0.028	87.88	2018
HATS-58A	Centaurus	12^{h} 27^{m} 09.0^{s}	−48° 58′ 42″	11.55	1,605	F0V	HATS-58Ab	1.03+0.23 −0.23	1.095+0.062 −0.062	4.2180896	0.05798		85.69	2018
HATS-59	Crater	11^{h} 21^{m} 18.0^{s}	−22° 23′ 17″	14.0	2,133	G5V	HATS-59b	0.806+0.069 −0.069	1.126+0.077 −0.077	5.416081	0.06112	0.129	88.1	2018
HATS-59	Crater	11^{h} 21^{m} 18.0^{s}	−22° 23′ 17″	14.0	2,133	G5V	HATS-59c	>12.7		1422	2.5	<0.08		2018
HATS-60	Aquarius	22^{h} 45^{m} 27.0^{s}	−14° 59′ 30″	12.6	1,613	G4V	HATS-60b	0.662+0.055 −0.055	1.153+0.053 −0.053	3.560827	0.04708	<0.191	86.28	2018
HATS-61	Eridanus	04^{h} 06^{m} 38.0^{s}	−25° 20′ 59″	13.2	2,264	G7V	HATS-61b	3.4+0.14 −0.14	1.195+0.067 −0.067	7.817954	0.07908	<0.092	87.92	2018
HATS-62	Capricornus	20^{h} 49^{m} 48.0^{s}	−24° 18′ 12″	14.0	1,683	G8V	HATS-62b	<0.179	1.055+0.025 −0.025	3.2768838	0.04163	<0.298	87.92	2018
HATS-63	Eridanus	04^{h} 29^{m} 40.0^{s}	−28° 11′ 50″	13.7	2,069	G5V	HATS-63b	0.96+0.11 −0.11	1.207+0.037 −0.037	3.0566528	0.04026	<0.136	87.13	2018
HATS-64	Antlia	09^{h} 37^{m} 09.0^{s}	−29° 48′ 02″	12.8	3,545	F5V	HATS-64b	0.96+0.20 −0.20	1.679+0.081 −0.081	4.908897	0.06562	<0.151	87.24	2018
HATS-65	Sagittarius	19^{h} 31^{m} 46.0^{s}	−26° 44′ 25″	12.38	1,601	F7V	HATS-65b	0.821+0.083 −0.083	1.501+0.050 −0.050	3.1051610	0.04497	<0.062	84.82	2018
HATS-66	Puppis	06^{h} 45^{m} 35.0^{s}	−33° 52′ 54″	14.0	5,029	F4V	HATS-66b	5.33+0.68 −0.68	1.411+0.084 −0.084	3.1414391	0.04714	<0.064	87.06	2018
HATS-67	Centaurus	12^{h} 00^{m} 05.0^{s}	−46° 08′ 11″	14.0	3,206	F4V	HATS-67b	1.45+0.12 −0.12	1.685+0.047 −0.047	1.6091788	0.03032	<0.057	79.03	2018
HATS-68	Tucana	01^{h} 00^{m} 01.0^{s}	−58° 54′ 17″	12.16	2,019	F8V	HATS-68b	1.290+0.059 −0.059	1.232+0.039 −0.029	3.5862202	0.05071	<0.036	83.21	2018
HATS-69	Pavo	19^{h} 17^{m} 11.0^{s}	−60° 53′ 30″	13.76	1,371	K1.5V	HATS-69b	<0.577	0.945+0.022 −0.022	2.2252577	0.03211	<0.519	88.49	2018
HATS-70	Canis Major	07^{h} 16^{m} 25.0^{s}	−31° 14′ 40″	12.6	4,263	A6V	HATS-70b	12.9+1.8 −1.6	1.88+0.059 −0.066	1.8882378	0.03632	<0.18	86.7	2018
HATS-71	Tucana	01^{h} 02^{m} 12.7^{s}	−61° 45′ 22″	15.4	459.6	M3V	HATS-71b	0.37+0.24 −0.24	1.024+0.018 −0.018	3.7955202	0.03745		88.82	2018
Zembra	Aquarius	20^{h} 34^{m} 55.6^{s}	−10° 33′ 22.1″	12.7	416.4	K3.5V	Zembretta	0.1254±0.0039	0.7224±0.0032	7.3279	0.066517	<0.013	88.56	2020

== See also ==
- List of extrasolar planets

A subset of HATNet light curves are available at the NASA Exoplanet Archive.

=== Other extrasolar planet search projects ===
- Trans-Atlantic Exoplanet Survey or TrES
- SuperWASP or WASP
- XO Telescope or XO
- Kilodegree Extremely Little Telescope or KELT
- Next-Generation Transit Survey or NGTS

=== Extrasolar planet searching spacecraft ===
- COROT is a CNES/ESA spacecraft launched in December 2006
- The Kepler Mission is a NASA spacecraft launched in March 2009
- The Transiting Exoplanet Survey Satellite (TESS) is a NASA spacecraft launched in March 2018
