= Tuiren =

Tuiren may refer to:

- Tuireann, Irish mythological figure
- HAT-P-36, or Tuiren, a star
