= DI Herculis =

Binary star in the constellation of Hercules

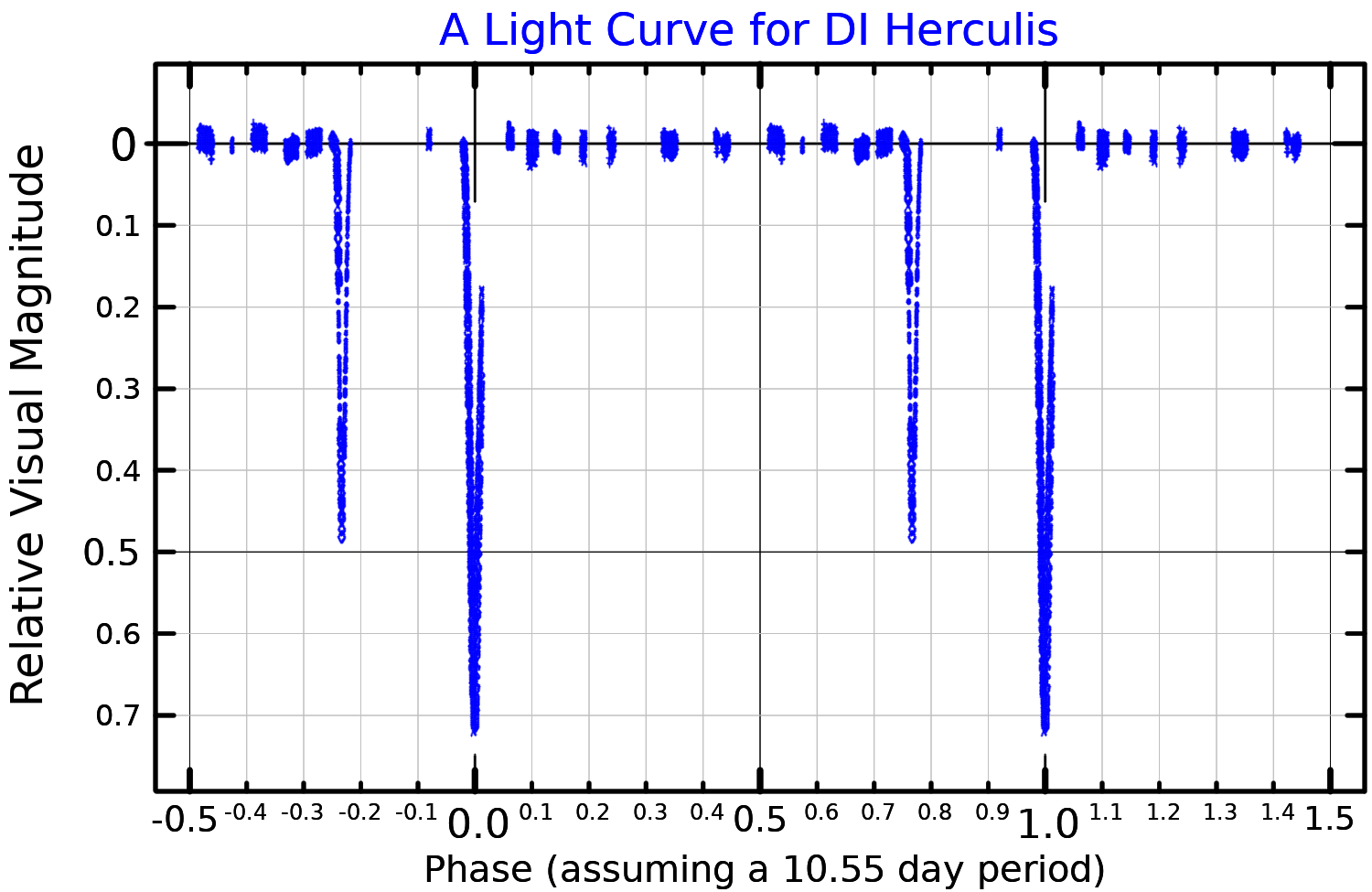
- A visual band light curve for DI Herculis, adapted from Marshall et al. (1995)

Observation data Epoch J2000 Equinox ICRS
- Constellation: Hercules
- Right ascension: 18^{h} 53^{m} 26.23992^{s}
- Declination: +24° 16′ 40.7926″
- Apparent magnitude (V): 8.47

Characteristics
- Spectral type: B5 / B4
- Variable type: Algol

Astrometry
| Radial velocity (R_{v}) | −2.1 ± 2 km/s |
| Proper motion (μ) | RA: −1.350(17) mas/yr Dec.: −3.995(22) mas/yr |
| Parallax (π) | 1.5813±0.0221 mas |
| Distance | 2,060 ± 30 ly (632 ± 9 pc) |

Orbit
| Primary | DI Her A |
| Name | DI Her B |
| Period (P) | 10.550164 days |
| Eccentricity (e) | 0.489 |
| Inclination (i) | 89.3° |
| Argument of periastron (ω) (secondary) | 330.2° |
| Semi-amplitude (K_{1}) (primary) | 110.7 km/s |
| Semi-amplitude (K_{2}) (secondary) | 126.6 km/s |

Details

DI Her A
| Mass | 5.15 M_{☉} |
| Radius | 2.68 R_{☉} |
| Temperature | 17300 K |

DI Her B
| Mass | 4.52 M_{☉} |
| Radius | 2.48 R_{☉} |
| Temperature | 15400 K |

Other designations
- DI Her, BD+24 3568, HD 175227, HIP 92708, SAO 86544, WDS J19079+4652AB, TYC 2109-775-1, 2MASS J18532623+2416408

Database references
| SIMBAD | data |

DI Herculis is an Algol-type eclipsing binary star in the constellation of Hercules. The system has an apparent magnitude of about +8.5 and consists of two young blue stars of spectral type B5 and B4. It is about two thousand light years from Earth.

The orbit of the stars around their mutual centre of gravity is very elliptical, with an eccentricity of 0.489 and a semi-major axis of 0.201 astronomical units, resulting in an extremely close approach of the two stars at periastron.

Stellar masses of 5.15 and 4.52 solar masses lead to a theoretical precession of 4.27 degrees per century, at odds with the observed precession. However, detailed observations reveal an unexpectedly extreme obliquity of the spin axes of the two stars. One of the two stars is tipped over by at least 70 degrees from the vertical, and the other is tipped the opposite way by more than 80 degrees. Incorporating the effect of oblateness of the stars due to the unusually tilted axes, the predicted precession is consistent with general relativity.

== Precession of periastron ==
The precession of the periastron of the orbit of the stars serves as a test of the predictions of Einstein's general theory of relativity. The known factors of the orbital distance of the stars, eccentricity, and stellar masses allows a theoretical prediction of precession of 4.27 degrees per century (1.93 degrees from classical effects and 2.34 degrees from general relativistic effects). However, the observed precession can be measured from eclipse timing, leading to an original measure of 1.04 degrees per century, and a more precise recent measurement of 1.39 degrees per century.

This discrepancy between theory and experiment has led to extensive studies of the bright binary system in the last thirty years; solutions discussed included

- new theories of gravitation
- tidal forces (perhaps due to unusual internal structure in the stars) leading to a circularisation of the elliptical orbit
- a third body in the system
- presence of a circumstellar cloud between the two components
- unusual rotation axes of the stars

After observations of the Rossiter–McLaughlin effect in 2009, it emerged that the rotation axes of the two stars lay roughly in the orbital plane of the system. When this is taken account in calculating the rate of precession, the difference between expected and observed precession disappears; so DI Hercules is no longer a test case for a possible falsification of general relativity. However, a more recent research article shows that the 2009 study leaves many questions unanswered regarding the solution for the axes. For example, orbital effects caused by the tilting of the axes have not been observed; also, the stars' rotation axes themselves may also be precessing.

== Journal references ==
- A. Claret; G. Torres; M. Wolf (2010). "DI Herculis as a test of internal stellar structure and general relativity". Astronomy & Astrophysics. 515: A4. arXiv:1002.2949. Bibcode:2010A&A...515A...4C. doi:10.1051/0004-6361/200913942. S2CID 118582950.
- A. Dariush; N. Riazi (2003). "A New Apsidal Motion Study of DI Her". Astrophysics and Space Science. 283 (2): 253–261. Bibcode:2003Ap&SS.283..257D. doi:10.1023/A:1021380815734. S2CID 118274078.
