= Jebus =

Jebus may refer to:

- Jeebus, the mispronunciation of "Jesus" from the 2000 Simpsons episode "Missionary: Impossible"
- Jebus, the pointed bow leader of the Tom Pudding tub boats
- Jebusite, a Canaanite tribe that inhabited the area of Jerusalem prior to the conquest initiated by Joshua
- Jerusalem (historically Jebus), a city in the Middle East
- HAT-P-23b, an exoplanet named Jebus
