= HAT-P-27 =

Star in the constellation Virgo

Observation data Epoch J2000 Equinox ICRS
- Constellation: Virgo
- Right ascension: 14^{h} 51^{m} 04.1870^{s}
- Declination: +05° 56′ 50.549″
- Apparent magnitude (V): 12.214

Characteristics
- Evolutionary stage: main-sequence star
- Spectral type: G8

Astrometry
Radial velocity (R_{v})	−16.74±0.56 km/s
Proper motion (μ)	RA: −28.610(19) mas/yr Dec.: −2.774(19) mas/yr
Parallax (π)	4.9528±0.0169 mas
Distance	659 ± 2 ly (201.9 ± 0.7 pc)

Orbit
Primary	HAT-P-27
Name	HAT-P-27 B
Semi-major axis (a)	0.656±0.021" (131 AU)

Details
Mass	0.945±0.035 M_{☉}
Radius	0.898^{+0.054}_{−0.039} R_{☉}
Luminosity	0.57^{+0.09}_{−0.07} L_{☉}
Surface gravity (log g)	4.51±0.04 cgs
Temperature	5300±90 K
Metallicity [Fe/H]	0.29±0.10 dex
Rotation	0.4±0.4
Rotational velocity (v sin i)	0.6^{+0.7}_{−0.4} km/s
Age	4.4^{+3.8}_{−2.6} Gyr

Other designations
- HAT-P-27, TOI-5672, TIC 461239485, WASP-40, GSC 00333-00351, 2MASS J14510418+0556505

Database references
SIMBAD	data
Exoplanet Archive	data

HAT-P-27, also known as WASP-40, is the primary of a binary star system about 659 light-years away. It is a G-type main-sequence star. The star's age is similar to the Sun's at 4.4 billion years. HAT-P-27 is enriched in heavy elements, having a 195% concentration of iron compared to the Sun.

A very dim stellar companion was detected in 2015 at a projected separation of 0.656″ and proven to be physically bound to the system in 2016.

== Planetary system ==
In 2011 a transiting hot Jupiter type planet b was detected in a mildly eccentric orbit. The planetary equilibrium temperature is 1207±41 K. A survey in 2013 failed to find any Rossiter-McLaughlin effect and therefore was unable to constrain the inclination of planetary orbit to the equatorial plane of the parent star. No orbital decay was detected as of 2018, despite the close proximity of the planet to the star.

The presence of an additional planet in the system has been suspected since 2015.

In 2024, a detection of a possible Neptune-like planet was reported. It is expected to be an analog of Neptune in terms of radius, although much hotter due to the low orbital separation; one year on this planet lasts one day and five hours, causing the planetary equilibrium temperature to be 1,426 K (1,153 °C). More observations are needed to validate its existence.

The HAT-P-27 planetary system
Companion (in order from star)	Mass	Semimajor axis (AU)	Orbital period (days)	Eccentricity	Inclination (°)	Radius
b	0.660±0.033 M_{J}	0.0403±0.0005	3.039586±0.000012	0.078±0.047	85.0±0.2	1.038^{+0.077}_{−0.058} R_{J}
c (unconfirmed)	17.8^{+13.8}_{−0.81} M_{🜨}	—	1.1994(2)	<0.19	—	4.33±0.44 R_{🜨}
