= HAT-P-30 =

G-type main-sequence star

Observation data Epoch J2000 Equinox ICRS
- Constellation: Hydra
- Right ascension: 08^{h} 15^{m} 47.9802^{s}
- Declination: +05° 50′ 12.351″
- Apparent magnitude (V): 10.35

Characteristics
- Evolutionary stage: main sequence
- Spectral type: G0

Astrometry
Radial velocity (R_{v})	45.14±0.37 km/s
Proper motion (μ)	RA: −17.231 mas/yr Dec.: +23.875 mas/yr
Parallax (π)	4.8037±0.0148 mas
Distance	679 ± 2 ly (208.2 ± 0.6 pc)

Details
Mass	1.175±0.025 M_{☉}
Radius	1.314±0.015 R_{☉}
Luminosity	2.37±0.01 L_{☉}
Surface gravity (log g)	4.270±0.007 cgs
Temperature	6,252±100 K
Metallicity [Fe/H]	−0.079±0.079 dex
Rotational velocity (v sin i)	3.6±0.4 km/s
Age	4.1±0.6 Gyr

Other designations
- HAT-P-30, BD+06 1909, TOI-490, TIC 455135327, WASP-51, GSC 00208-00722, 2MASS J08154797+0550121

Database references
SIMBAD	data
Exoplanet Archive	data

HAT-P-30, also known as WASP-51, is the primary of a binary star system about 679 light-years away in the constellation Hydra. It is a G-type main-sequence star. HAT-P-30 has a similar concentration of heavy elements compared to the Sun.

The faint stellar companion was detected in 2013 at a projected separation of 3.842±0.007″.

== Planetary system ==
In 2011 a transiting hot Jupiter planet, HAT-P-30b, was independently detected by two teams, the HATNet Project and the Wide Angle Search for Planets (WASP).

The planetary orbit is strongly misaligned with the equatorial plane of the star, the misalignment angle being equal to 73.5±9.0°.

Since 2022, an additional planet in the system is suspected based on transit timing variations.

The HAT-P-30 planetary system
Companion (in order from star)	Mass	Semimajor axis (AU)	Orbital period (days)	Eccentricity	Inclination (°)	Radius
b	0.723±0.023 M_{J}	0.04114±0.00030	2.8106006(4)	<0.016	82.56±0.08	1.426±0.020 R_{J}
