= HAT-P-17 =

K-type main sequence star in the constellation Cygnus

Observation data Epoch J2000 Equinox ICRS
- Constellation: Cygnus
- Right ascension: 21^{h} 38^{m} 08.7310^{s}
- Declination: +30° 29′ 19.446″
- Apparent magnitude (V): 10.38

Characteristics
- Evolutionary stage: main sequence
- Spectral type: early K

Astrometry
Proper motion (μ)	RA: −80.280(16) mas/yr Dec.: −127.037(15) mas/yr
Parallax (π)	10.8195±0.0182 mas
Distance	301.5 ± 0.5 ly (92.4 ± 0.2 pc)
Absolute magnitude (M_{V})	+5.75

Details
Mass	0.79 M_{☉}
Radius	0.87 R_{☉}
Luminosity	0.50 L_{☉}
Surface gravity (log g)	4.53±0.02 cgs
Temperature	5345±70 K
Metallicity [Fe/H]	0.06±0.08 dex
Rotational velocity (v sin i)	0.56+0.12 −0.14 km/s
Age	7.8 Gyr

Other designations
- TYC 2717-417-1, GSC 02717-00417, 2MASS J21380873+3029193

Database references
SIMBAD	data

HAT-P-17 is a K-type main-sequence star about 92.4 parsecs (301 ly) away. It has a mass of about 0.857 ± 0.039 M_{☉}. It is the host of two planets, HAT-P-17b and HAT-P-17c, both discovered in 2010. A search for a binary companion star using adaptive optics at the MMT Observatory was negative. A candidate companion was detected by a spectroscopic search of high-resolution K band infrared spectra taken at the Keck observatory.

== Planetary system ==
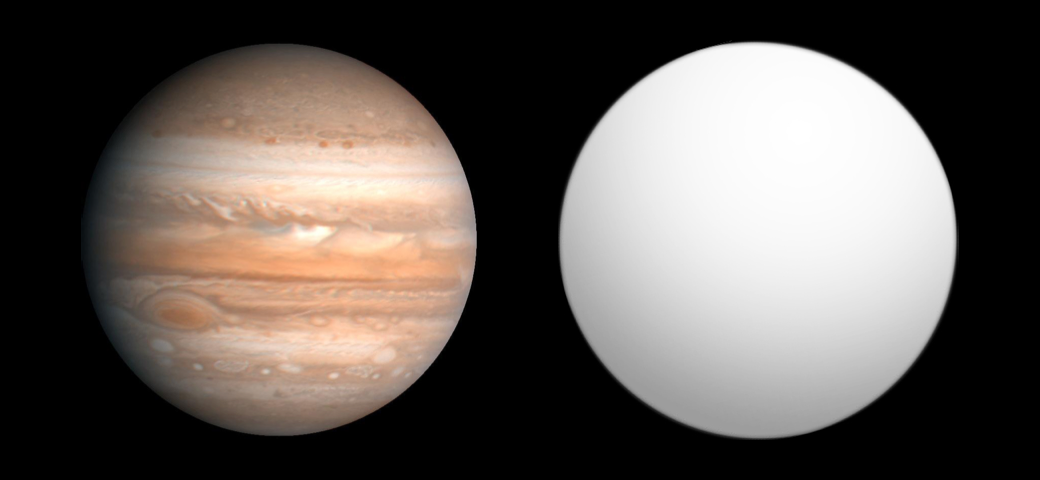
Comparison of the exoplanet HAT-P-17 b with the planet Jupiter

In 2010, a multi-planet system consisting of a transiting hot Saturn in an eccentric orbit and a Jupiter-like planet in an outer orbit was detected. The transiting planet HAT-P-17b was detected by the HATNet Project using telescopes located in Hawaii, Arizona and at Wise Observatory in Israel. It was confirmed with radial velocity measurements taken at the Keck telescope which also led to the discovery of the second planet on a much wider orbit.

In 2013, radial velocity measurements of the Rossiter-McLaughlin effect showed that the sky-projected angle between the stellar spin axis and the orbit of planet b was approximately 19°. The measurement in 2022 have resulted in slightly larger misalignment of 26.3±6.7°.

The HAT-P-17 planetary system
Companion (in order from star)	Mass	Semimajor axis (AU)	Orbital period (days)	Eccentricity	Inclination (°)	Radius
b	0.537±0.017 M_{J}	0.0882+0.0013 −0.0014	10.338523+0.000088 −0.000089	0.3417±0.0036	89.20+0.20 −0.10	1.010±0.029 R_{J}
c	> 2.88±0.10 M_{J}	4.67±0.14	3972+185 −146	0.295±0.021	—	—
