= HATS-11b =

Jupiter-like exoplanet

Discovery
- Discovered by: HATNet Project
- Discovery date: 2016
- Detection method: primary transit

Orbital characteristics
- Semi-major axis: 0.04614 AU
- Eccentricity: 0.34
- Orbital period (sidereal): ~3.6
- Inclination: 88.31 degrees

Physical characteristics
- Mean radius: 1.51 R_{j}
- Mass: 0.85 M_{j}
- Temperature: 1637K

HATS-11b, also known as EPIC 216414930b, is a confirmed exoplanet, or exosolar planet, discovered in 2016 and has been described as similar to Jupiter. It orbits the star HATS-11.

== Discovery ==
HATS-11b was discovered in 2016, using the primary transit method, by the Hungarian Automated Telescope Network (HATNet) in the HATSouth survey, which aims to discover exoplanets using the transit method. Since 2009 (when the HATSouth project began), 61 exoplanets have been discovered, as of 10th Feb 2020. The mass of HATS-11b was found using the radial velocity method.

== Characteristics ==
HATS-11b has been described as similar to Jupiter and orbits a low metallicity star which is about 2,955 light-years (906 parsecs) distant. This planet has an orbital period of around 3.6 Earth days and its temperature has been calculated to be 1,637 K (1,364 °C). HATS-11b has a mass of 0.85M_{J} and a radius of 1.49R_{J}. The planet's orbital eccentricity is less than 0.34, which is an elliptical orbit.

== Star ==
HATS-11b orbits around the star HATS-11. HATS-11 has a solar mass of 1M_{☉} and has a solar radius of 1.44R_{☉}. It is a type G0 star, of about medium heat. HATS-11 is very metal-poor; it has a metallicity of around -3.09 [Fe/H], which is roughly one-thousandth the abundance of iron relative to the Sun. The star has an effective temperature of around 6,060 K (5,790 °C). HATS-11 is roughly 7.7 billion years old and has an apparent magnitude of 14, which is not visible with the naked eye.

== See also ==
- HATNet Project
- Lists of exoplanets
- Methods of detecting exoplanets
