= HAT-P-50b =

Extrasolar planet in the constellation Gemini

Discovery
- Discovery site: HATNet Project
- Discovery date: 2015
- Detection method: Primary transit

Orbital characteristics
- Semi-major axis: 0.0453+0.00058 −0.0014 AU
- Eccentricity: <0.115
- Orbital period (sidereal): 3.12201 ± 0.0000065 d
- Inclination: 83.65 ± 0.65
- Star: HAT-P-50

Physical characteristics
- Mean radius: 1.288 ± 0.64 R_{J}
- Mass: 1.36 ± 0.075 M_{J}

HAT-P-50b is an exoplanet orbiting HAT-P-50 star located in the constellation Gemini. It was discovered in 2015.
