= HATS-70 =

A-type main-sequence star

Observation data Epoch J2000 Equinox J2000
- Constellation: Canis Major
- Right ascension: 07^{h} 16^{m} 25.08800^{s}
- Declination: −31° 14′ 39.8583″
- Apparent magnitude (V): 12.23

Characteristics
- Evolutionary stage: main sequence
- Spectral type: A

Astrometry
Proper motion (μ)	RA: -2.396 mas/yr Dec.: +2.443 mas/yr
Parallax (π)	0.7504±0.0133 mas
Distance	4,350 ± 80 ly (1,330 ± 20 pc)

Details
Mass	1.78±0.12 M_{☉}
Radius	1.881+0.059 −0.066 R_{☉}
Luminosity	12.0+5.5 −3.4 L_{☉}
Surface gravity (log g)	4.167+0.044 −0.036 cgs
Temperature	7,930+630 −820 K
Metallicity [Fe/H]	0.041+0.095 −0.107 dex
Rotational velocity (v sin i)	40.61+0.32 −0.35 km/s
Age	0.81+0.50 −0.33 Gyr

Other designations
- HATS-70, TOI-1916, TIC 98545929, TYC 7103-114-1, 2MASS J07162509-3114397

Database references
SIMBAD	data
Exoplanet Archive	data

HATS-70 is a single star in the constellation of Canis Major at a distance of approximately 4,350 light-years (1,330 parsecs) from the Sun. The apparent magnitude of the star is +12.23, meaning it is much too faint to be visible to the naked eye. The age of the star is about 810 million years and it has one planet in its orbit.

== Characteristics ==
HATS-70 is an A-type main-sequence star, with a mass 1.78 times larger than the Sun's mass, 1.88 times the radius, and 12 times the luminosity. It has an effective temperature of 7,930 K (7,660 °C; 13,810 °F). It is a rapidly rotating star with measurable oblateness.

== Planetary system ==
In 2018, a group of astronomers working as part of the HATSouth project announced the discovery of a massive planet or brown dwarf around this star, HATS-70b. This object's mass is close to the deuterium fusion limit, and the discovery paper refers to it as a brown dwarf. It is in a close orbit with a period of less than two days, with an obliquity of 13.2°+6.4°
−5.9° (or 160.4°+5.4°
−5.2°) to the star's equator.

The HATS-70 planetary system
Companion (in order from star)	Mass	Semimajor axis (AU)	Orbital period (days)	Eccentricity	Inclination	Radius
b	12.9+1.8 −1.6 M_{J}	0.03632+0.00074 −0.00087	1.8882378(15)	<0.18	86.7+1.6 −1.9°	1.384+0.079 −0.074 R_{J}
