= HAT-P-14b =

Exoplanet in the constellation of Hercules

HAT-P-14b / Sissi
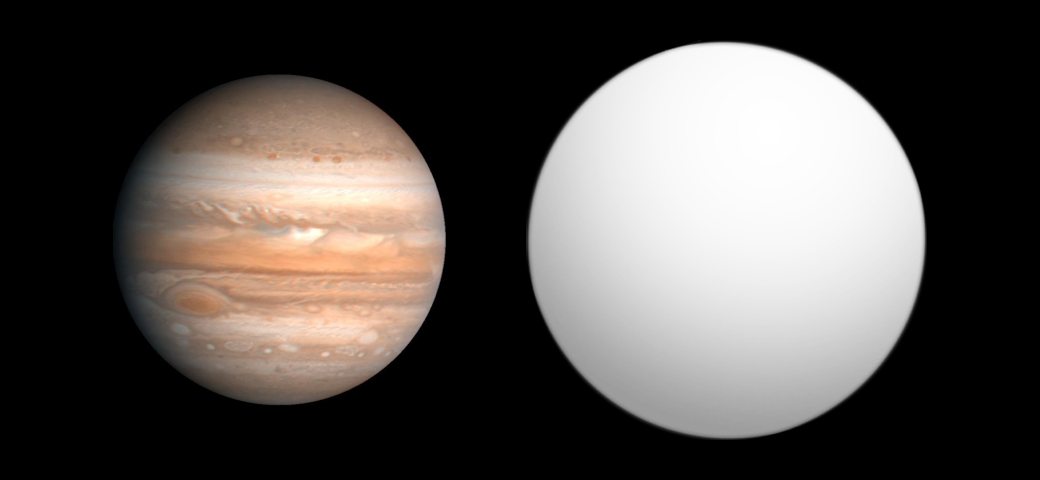
- Size comparison of Jupiter with HAT-P-14b.

Discovery
- Discovered by: HATNet Project
- Discovery date: 2010-03-10
- Detection method: Transit

Designations
- Alternative names: WASP-27b, Sissi

Orbital characteristics
- Semi-major axis: 0.06062+0.00065 −0.00067 AU
- Eccentricity: 0.1074+0.0076 −0.0079
- Orbital period (sidereal): 4.627686±0.000077 d
- Inclination: 84.1167^{+0.0026}_{−0.0025}
- Star: HAT-P-14

Physical characteristics
- Mean radius: 1.101±0.036 R_{J}
- Mass: 2.444±0.060 M_{J}
- Surface gravity: 7.49±0.36 g
- Temperature: 1566±21

HAT-P-14b, officially named Sissi and also known as WASP-27b, is an extrasolar planet located approximately 224.2 ± 0.6 parsecs (731.2 ± 2.0 ly) away in the constellation of Hercules, orbiting the 10th magnitude F-type main-sequence star HAT-P-14. This planet was discovered in 2010 by the HATNet Project using the transit method. It was independently detected by the SuperWASP project.

== Host star ==
The host star is a main-sequence star with the spectral classification F5V and apparent magnitude 9.98, well below the naked-eye visibility limit. It has a mass of 1.386±0.045 M_{☉}, a radius of 1.468±0.054 R_{☉}, and a surface temperature of 6477+13
−15 K. The star HAT-P-14 is named Franz.

== History ==
The planet HAT-P-14b was named Sissi. The name was selected by Austria as part of the NameExoWorlds campaign for the 100th anniversary of the IAU. The planet was named after the character Sissi in the movie Sissi, who is married to Franz. The role is played by the actress Romy Schneider. The star HAT-P-14 is named Franz.

HAT-P-14b was selected as the target object for testing the James Webb Space Telescope instruments intended for spectroscopic studies of transiting exoplanets. It was chosen because its high surface gravity should produce a very flat spectrum, regardless of the planet's composition.

== Orbit ==
HAT-P-14b is located very close orbit to its star, taking only 4.6 days to complete one orbit. Observations of the Rossiter–McLaughlin effect with the Keck telescope show that it orbits in a retrograde fashion relative to the rotation axes of its parent star, spin-orbit angle equal to -170.9±5.1°.
