= HAT-P-12 =

K-type main sequence star in constellation Canes Venatici

HAT-P-12 / Komondor
Observation data Epoch J2000 Equinox J2000
- Constellation: Canes Venatici
- Right ascension: 13^{h} 57^{m} 33.4669^{s}
- Declination: +43° 29′ 36.602″
- Apparent magnitude (V): 12.84

Characteristics
- Evolutionary stage: main sequence
- Spectral type: K4
- Apparent magnitude (J): 10.794±0.023
- Apparent magnitude (H): 10.236±0.022
- Apparent magnitude (K): 10.108±0.016
- Variable type: planetary transit

Astrometry
Radial velocity (R_{v})	−40.4589±0.0023 km/s
Proper motion (μ)	RA: −134.793(8) mas/yr Dec.: −44.229(11) mas/yr
Parallax (π)	7.0448±0.0105 mas
Distance	463.0 ± 0.7 ly (141.9 ± 0.2 pc)
Absolute magnitude (M_{V})	+12.35±0.23

Details
Mass	0.719±0.016 M_{☉}
Radius	0.7084±0.0095 R_{☉}
Luminosity	0.21^{+0.02}_{−0.01} L_{☉}
Surface gravity (log g)	4.594±0.013 cgs
Temperature	4710±49 K
Metallicity [Fe/H]	−0.24^{+0.055}_{−0.062} dex
Rotation	0.5±0.4 km/s
Age	2.5±2.0 Gyr

Other designations
- Komondor, HAT-P-12, GSC 03033-00706, 2MASS J13573347+4329367, Gaia DR3 1499514786891168640, SDSS J135733.42+432936.5

Database references
SIMBAD	data
Exoplanet Archive	data

HAT-P-12, also named Komondor, is a magnitude 13 low-metallicity K dwarf star approximately 463 light years away in the constellation Canes Venatici, which hosts one known exoplanet.

== Nomenclature ==
The designation HAT-P-12 indicates that this was the 12th star found to have a planet by the HATNet Project.

In August 2022, this planetary system was included among 20 systems to be named by the third NameExoWorlds project. The approved names, proposed by a team from Hungary, were announced in June 2023. HAT-P-12 is named Komondor and its planet is named Puli, after the Hungarian Komondor and Puli dog breeds.

== Planetary system ==
In 2009 an exoplanet, HAT-P-12b, was discovered by the HATNet Project orbiting this star. The planet was discovered using the transit method and confirmed by follow up radial velocity measurements. Transit-timing variations suggested the possible presence of additional non-transiting planets in the system, but this was later discarded, as no variations were found.

The HAT-P-12 planetary system
Companion (in order from star)	Mass	Semimajor axis (AU)	Orbital period (days)	Eccentricity	Inclination (°)	Radius
b / Puli	0.211±0.012 M_{J}	0.0384±0.0003	3.2130598±0.000006	0	89.0±0.4	0.959^{+0.029}_{−0.021} R_{J}

== See also ==
- List of extrasolar planets
