= HATS-3 =

Star in the constellation Cetus

Observation data Epoch J2000 Equinox ICRS
- Constellation: Capricornus
- Right ascension: 20^{h} 49^{m} 49.78530^{s}
- Declination: −24° 25′ 43.5378″
- Apparent magnitude (V): 12.4

Characteristics
- Evolutionary stage: main sequence
- Spectral type: F

Astrometry
Radial velocity (R_{v})	−22.07±0.83 km/s
Proper motion (μ)	RA: 10.393 mas/yr Dec.: 15.478 mas/yr
Parallax (π)	2.3595±0.0171 mas
Distance	1,380 ± 10 ly (424 ± 3 pc)

Details
Mass	1.210±0.040 M_{☉}
Radius	1.400±0.030 R_{☉}
Luminosity	2.3 L_{☉}
Surface gravity (log g)	4.22±0.01 cgs
Temperature	6351±76 K
Metallicity [Fe/H]	−0.157±0.070 dex
Rotational velocity (v sin i)	9.1±1.3 km/s
Age	3.20+0.60 −0.40 Gyr

Other designations
- HATS-3, TOI-103, TIC 336732616, TYC 6926-454-1, GSC 06926-00454, 2MASS J20494978-2425436

Database references
SIMBAD	data

HATS-3 is an F-type main-sequence star 1,380 light-years (420 parsecs) away. Its surface temperature is 6351±76 K. HATS-3 is relatively depleted in its concentration of heavy elements, with a metallicity Fe/H index of −0.157±0.07, but is slightly younger than the Sun at an age of 3.2^{+0.6}_{−0.4} billion years.

A multiplicity survey in 2016 detected a candidate stellar companion to HATS-3, 3.671±0.016 arc-seconds away.

== Planetary system ==
In 2013, one planet, named HATS-3b, was discovered on a tight, nearly circular orbit. The planetary orbit of HATS-3b is likely aligned with the equatorial plane of the star, at a misalignment angle of 3±25°. The planetary equilibrium temperature is 1643 K.

The HATS-3 planetary system
Companion (in order from star)	Mass	Semimajor axis (AU)	Orbital period (days)	Eccentricity	Inclination (°)	Radius
b	1.10+0.18 −0.19 M_{J}	0.04852+0.00053 −0.00054	3.5478510(50)	<0.30	86.20±0.30	1.381±0.035 R_{J}
