= HAT-P-26 =

Star in the constellation Virgo

HAT-P-26 / Guahayona
Observation data Epoch J2000 Equinox ICRS
- Constellation: Virgo
- Right ascension: 14^{h} 12^{m} 37.53311^{s}
- Declination: +04° 03′ 36.1166″
- Apparent magnitude (V): 11.76

Characteristics
- Evolutionary stage: Main sequence
- Spectral type: K1

Astrometry
Radial velocity (R_{v})	+14.10±0.39 km/s
Proper motion (μ)	RA: +37.735 mas/yr Dec.: −142.816 mas/yr
Parallax (π)	6.9985±0.0204 mas
Distance	466 ± 1 ly (142.9 ± 0.4 pc)

Details
Mass	0.78(1) M_{☉}
Radius	0.91(3) R_{☉}
Luminosity	0.38+0.16 −0.06 L_{☉}
Surface gravity (log g)	4.45(5) cgs
Temperature	5006(61) K
Metallicity	−0.023(37)
Rotational velocity (v sin i)	0.23(8) km/s
Age	9.0+3.0 −4.9 Gyr

Other designations
- Guahayona, TYC 320-1027-1, GSC 0320-01027, 2MASS J14123753+0403359, Gaia DR2 3668036348641580288

Database references
SIMBAD	data

HAT-P-26 is a K-type main-sequence star located about 466 light-years (143 parsecs) away in the constellation of Virgo. A survey in 2015 did not find any stellar companions in orbit around it, although a red dwarf companion with a temperature 4000+100
−350 K is suspected on a wide orbit.

== Nomenclature ==
The designation HAT-P-26 indicates that this was the 26th star found to have a planet by the HATNet Project.

In August 2022, this planetary system was included among 20 systems to be named by the third NameExoWorlds project. The approved names, proposed by a team from Puerto Rico, were announced in June 2023. HAT-P-26 is named Guahayona and its planet is named Guataubá, after figures from Taíno mythology.

== Planetary system ==
In 2010 a transiting hot Neptune planet was detected. The transiting planet HAT-P-26b was detected by the HATNet Project using telescopes located in Hawaii and Arizona. The planet is likely formed by pebble accretion mechanism. The transmission spectrum of HAT-P-26b was taken in 2015, with the best fit favouring either a cloudless atmosphere or an atmosphere with a low-lying cloud deck. The atmospheric composition of the planet was measured in 2019, and a water vapor volume fraction of 1.5^{+2.1}_{−0.9}% was detected. HAT-P-26 is carbon depleted, with a C/O ratio constrained to less than 0.33. Also, the planet's atmosphere contains light metal hydrides. The measured planetary temperature is equal to 563^{+58}_{−54} K.

In 2023, the atmosphere of the planet was found to contain 2.4%+2.9%
−1.6% water vapor at a temperature of 590+60
−50 K.

A 2019 study detected transit-timing variations (TTVs) of HAT-P-26b, the cause of which was unclear at that time. With more data by 2023, it was suggested that the TTVs may be caused by a second planet in the system. In 2024, a candidate second planet, about twice the size of Earth and slightly farther from the star than planet b, was detected by transit in TESS data, but requires further observations to be fully confirmed.

The HAT-P-26 planetary system
Companion (in order from star)	Mass	Semimajor axis (AU)	Orbital period (days)	Eccentricity	Inclination (°)	Radius
b / Guataubá	18.75±2.23 M_{🜨}	0.0479±0.0006	4.2345002±0.0000006	0.13±0.06	87.7+1.6 −2.0	6.33+0.81 −0.36 R_{🜨}
c (unconfirmed)	4.8+3.5 −2.0 (Note: This mass is predicted based on mass-radius relationships. If this planet is responsible for the observed TTVs it should be possible to measure its mass that way; the 2023 TTV study found a mass of about 6.36 Earths based on an assumed period of 8.47 days, but if the period is actually shorter at 6.59 days the mass would be different.) M_{🜨}	—	6.594+0.009 −0.007	<0.09	—	1.97±0.20 R_{🜨}
