= HD 233731 =

Suspected multiple star system in the constellation Ursa Major

Observation data Epoch J2000 Equinox J2000
- Constellation: Ursa Major
- Right ascension: 10^{h} 22^{m} 43.5923^{s}
- Declination: +50° 07′ 42.062″
- Apparent magnitude (V): 9.732

Characteristics
- Spectral type: G5V
- B−V color index: 0.86

Astrometry
Radial velocity (R_{v})	12.86(15) km/s
Proper motion (μ)	RA: −26.110(14) mas/yr Dec.: 83.806(16) mas/yr
Parallax (π)	12.2731±0.0155 mas
Distance	265.7 ± 0.3 ly (81.5 ± 0.1 pc)
Absolute magnitude (M_{V})	5.22±0.14

Details
Mass	0.936+0.028 −0.033 M_{☉}
Radius	1.062+0.046 −0.013 R_{☉}
Luminosity	0.77±0.09 L_{☉}
Surface gravity (log g)	4.357+0.039 −0.005 cgs
Temperature	5,314±50 K
Metallicity [Fe/H]	0.30±0.09 dex
Rotation	28.7±0.4 d
Rotational velocity (v sin i)	1.65±0.26 km/s
Age	9.0+1.4 −2.2 Gyr; 12.4±2.6 Gyr

Other designations
- HAT-P-22, HD 233731, TYC 3441-925-1, GSC 03441-00925, 2MASS J10224361+5007420, Gaia DR2 846946629987527168

Database references
SIMBAD	data

HD 233731, or HAT-P-22, is a suspected multiple star system in the northern circumpolar constellation of Ursa Major. It is invisible to the naked eye, having an apparent visual magnitude of 9.732. This system is located at a distance of 267 light years from the Sun based on parallax, and is drifting further away with a radial velocity of +13 km/s.

The stellar classification of the primary is G5V, matching an ordinary G-type main-sequence star. The star has a low level of stellar activity with an estimated age of 9 to 12 billion years old. Its metallicity is twice that of the Sun, unusual for its advanced age. HD 233731 has a similar mass and radius as the Sun, and is spinning with a rotation period of 28.7 days. It is radiating 77% of the luminosity of the Sun from its photosphere at an effective temperature of 5314 K.

A faint stellar companion (2MASS J10224397+5007504) with a red hue is located at an angular separation of 9 arcseconds from the primary. In 2015, a spectroscopic stellar companion was reported with a semimajor axis of less than 33 AU. This star has an effective temperature of 4,000+250
−400 K with a mass of 0.63+0.07
−0.17 M_{☉}.

== Planetary system ==
In 2010, a transiting hot Jupiter-like planet was detected, designated HAT-P-22b. It has an equilibrium temperature of 1,463±19 K, and planetary atmosphere is cloudy. The measurement of Rossiter-McLaughlin effect in 2018 has allowed to detect what the planetary orbit is well aligned with the equatorial plane of the star, with a misalignment angle equal to 25°±18°.

In 2017, analysis of additional HARPS data showed a long-term trend that suggested the presence of an additional orbiting companion, HAT-P-22c.

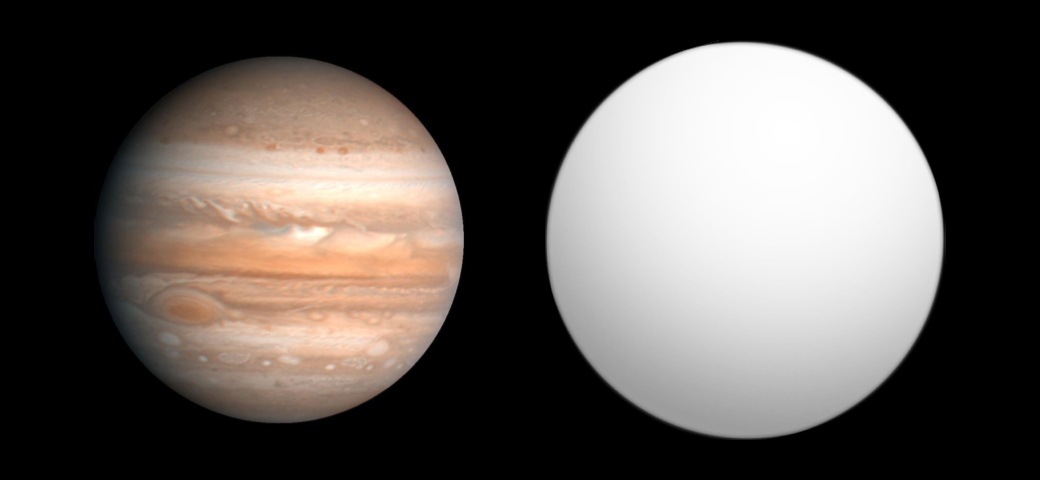
Size comparison of HAT-P-22 b and Jupiter

The HAT-P-22 planetary system
Companion (in order from star)	Mass	Semimajor axis (AU)	Orbital period (days)	Eccentricity	Inclination (°)	Radius
b	2.192^{+0.073}_{−0.013} M_{J}	0.04171^{+0.00042}_{−0.00050}	3.21223328	0.016±0.009	86.46±0.41	1.060±0.048 R_{J}
c (unconfirmed)	≥3.0 M_{J}	—	≥20.8 years	—	—	—
