= HAT-P-16 =

F-type main sequence star in the constellation Andromeda

Observation data Epoch J2000 Equinox ICRS
- Constellation: Andromeda
- Right ascension: 00^{h} 38^{m} 17.5584^{s}
- Declination: +42° 27′ 47.217″
- Apparent magnitude (V): 10.91

Characteristics
- Evolutionary stage: main sequence
- Spectral type: F8

Astrometry
Radial velocity (R_{v})	−16.67±0.42 km/s
Proper motion (μ)	RA: −21.535(12) mas/yr Dec.: −4.582(12) mas/yr
Parallax (π)	4.4958±0.0155 mas
Distance	725 ± 3 ly (222.4 ± 0.8 pc)

Details
Mass	1.218±0.039 M_{☉}
Radius	1.237±0.054 R_{☉}
Luminosity	1.97±0.22 L_{☉}
Surface gravity (log g)	4.34±0.03 cgs
Temperature	6140±72 K
Metallicity	0.12±0.08
Rotational velocity (v sin i)	3.5±0.5 km/s
Age	2.0±0.8 Gyr

Other designations
- TYC 2792-1700-1, GSC 02792-01700, 2MASS J00381756+4227470, Gaia DR2 3815923136483872000

Database references
SIMBAD	data

HAT-P-16 is a F-type main-sequence star about 725 light-years away. The star has a concentration of heavy elements slightly higher than solar abundance, and low starspot activity. The survey in 2015 have failed to find any stellar companions to it. The spectral analysis in 2014 have discovered the HAT-P-16 has a carbon to oxygen molar ratio of 0.58±0.08, close to Sun`s value of 0.55.

== Planetary system ==
In 2010 a transiting hot superjovian planet was detected. Transit-timing variation analysis in 2016 have failed to detect an additional planets in the system.

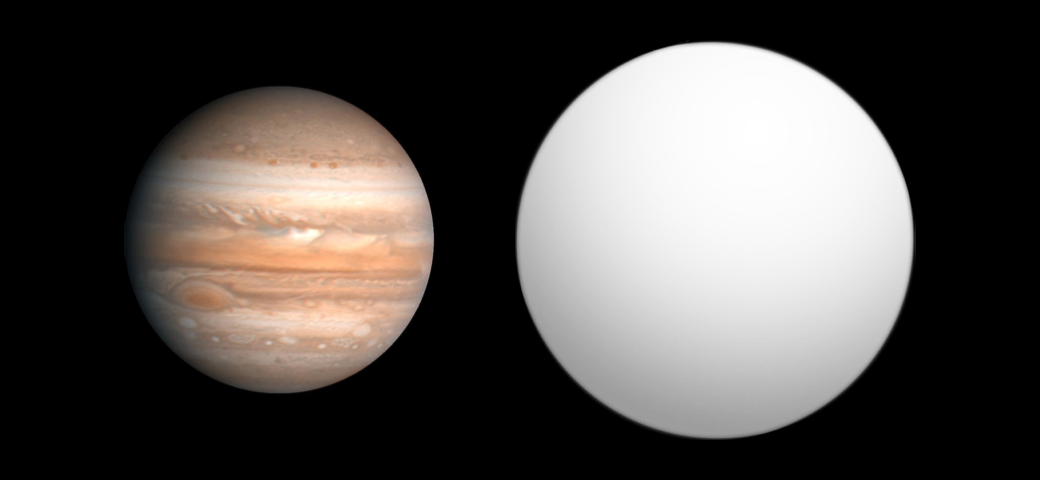
Size comparison of HAT-P-16 b and Jupiter

In 2011 the observation utilizing a Rossiter–McLaughlin effect was performed, and the orbit of HAT-P-16b was found to be probably aligned with the equatorial plane of the star, misalignment angle equal to 10±16°.

The planet HAT-P-16b equilibrium temperature was found to be equal to 1567±22 K in 2013. The multiband photometry have failed to find any Rayleigh scattering in the HAT-P-16b atmosphere, which may indicate a presence of hazes or dense cloud deck.

The HAT-P-16 planetary system
Companion (in order from star)	Mass	Semimajor axis (AU)	Orbital period (days)	Eccentricity	Inclination (°)	Radius
b	4.221±0.092 M_{J}	0.04134^{+0.00044}_{−0.00045}	2.7759704±0.0000007	0.0462^{+0.0027}_{−0.0024}	86.6±0.7	1.190±0.037 R_{J}
