= HAT-P-36 =

Star in constellation Canes Venatici

HAT-P-36 / Tuiren
- Location of HAT-P-36 (circled) within Canes Venatici

Observation data Epoch J2000.0 Equinox ICRS
- Constellation: Canes Venatici
- Right ascension: 12^{h} 33^{m} 03.9061^{s}
- Declination: +44° 54′ 55.196″
- Apparent magnitude (V): 12.26

Characteristics
- Evolutionary stage: main sequence
- Spectral type: G5V

Astrometry
Radial velocity (R_{v})	−16.434 km/s
Proper motion (μ)	RA: −11.622(8) mas/yr Dec.: 8.138(10) mas/yr
Parallax (π)	3.4055±0.0110 mas
Distance	958 ± 3 ly (293.6 ± 0.9 pc)

Details
Mass	1.005±0.020 M_{☉}
Radius	1.023±0.018 R_{☉}
Luminosity	0.969+0.078 −0.073 L_{☉}
Surface gravity (log g)	4.33±0.16 cgs
Temperature	5,550±80 K
Metallicity [Fe/H]	0.27±0.09 dex
Rotation	15.30±0.50 d
Rotational velocity (v sin i)	24.0±0.5 km/s
Age	6.6+2.9 −1.8 Gyr

Other designations
- Tuiren, TYC 3020-2221-1, 2MASS J12330390+4454552, Gaia DR3 1541532207133249920

Database references
SIMBAD	data
Exoplanet Archive	data

HAT-P-36, also referred to as Tuiren is a 12th magnitude G-type main-sequence star estimated to be approximately 958 light-years away from Earth in the constellation Canes Venatici. HAT-P-36 is too faint to be seen with the naked eye, but it is possible to view it with binoculars or a small telescope. In 2012 a hot Jupiter-type exoplanet was discovered orbiting HAT-P-36 with an orbital period of about 1.3 Earth days. In December 2019, HAT-P-36 was named Tuiren and its planetary companion, HAT-P-36b, was named Bran as a result of Ireland's contribution to the 2019 NameExoWorlds campaign. Bran has a mass approximately 1.8 times that of Jupiter and a radius 1.2 times larger.

== Etymology ==
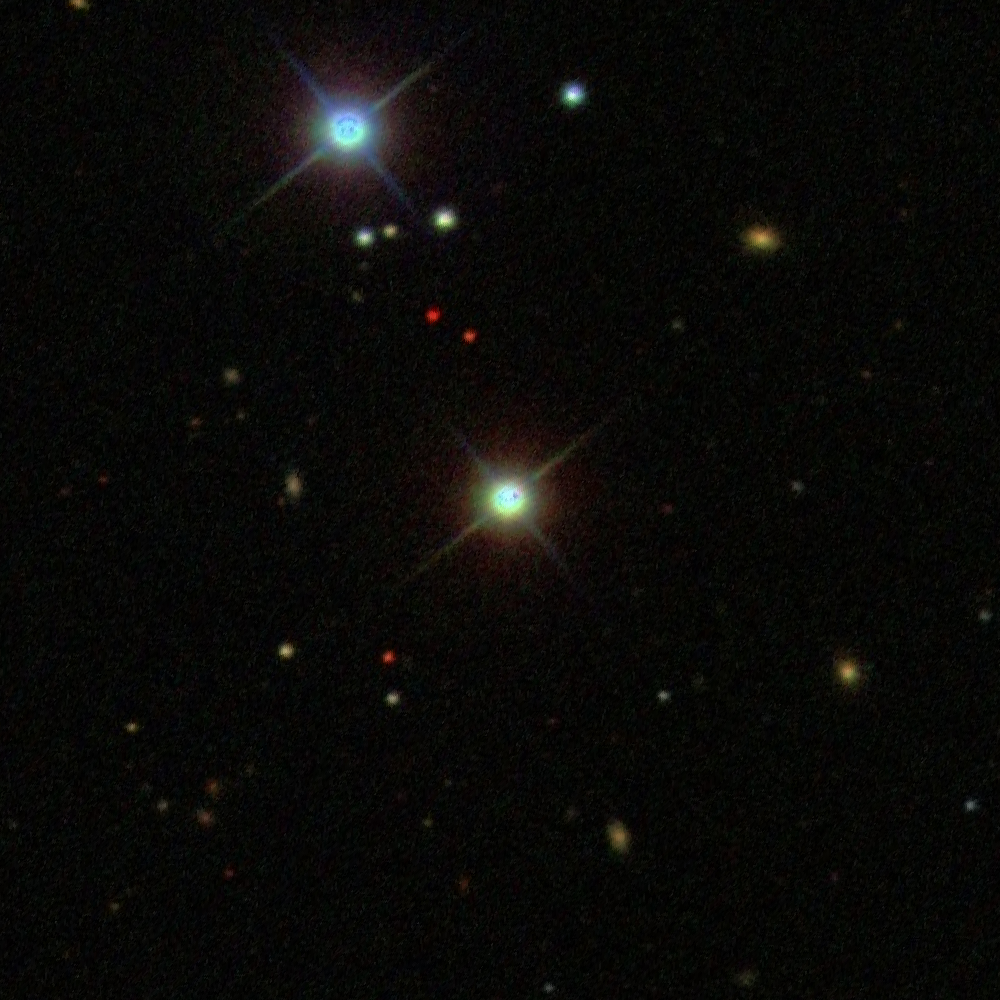
Tuiren (centre) as viewed in the Sloan Digital Sky Survey. The bright star to the top-left is TYC 3020-2195-1, an A-type main-sequence star approximately 3,156 light-years away.

HAT-P-36 and its planet are named after characters from The Birth of Bran, a story in the book Irish Fairy Tales by James Stephens. The book is a re-telling of various stories from Irish folklore. Tuiren was the aunt of the mythical hero Fionn mac Cumhaill and was turned into a hound by the fairy Uchtdealbh after Tuiren married her husband. Bran and Sceólan were the two puppies mothered by Tuiren while she was a dog. They were cousins of Fionn mac Cumhaill. The names were proposed by John Murphy, a teacher at Regina Mundi College, Cork.

== Planetary system ==
HAT-P-36b (Bran) was discovered in 2012 by the HATNet Project using the transit method. A search for transit timing variation did not result in detection of additional planets in the system as at 2021. Surprisingly, a planetary orbital period increase by 0.014 seconds per year was detected by 2021.

The HAT-P-36b planetary system
Companion (in order from star)	Mass	Semimajor axis (AU)	Orbital period (days)	Eccentricity	Inclination (°)	Radius
b (Bran)	1.832 M_{J}	0.02366±0.00016	1.327346977(49)	0	86.76±0.076	1.233±0.025 R_{J}

Size comparison
Jupiter	HAT-P-36b (Bran)
Jupiter	Exoplanet
