= GSC 06214-00210 b =

Gas giant exoplanet

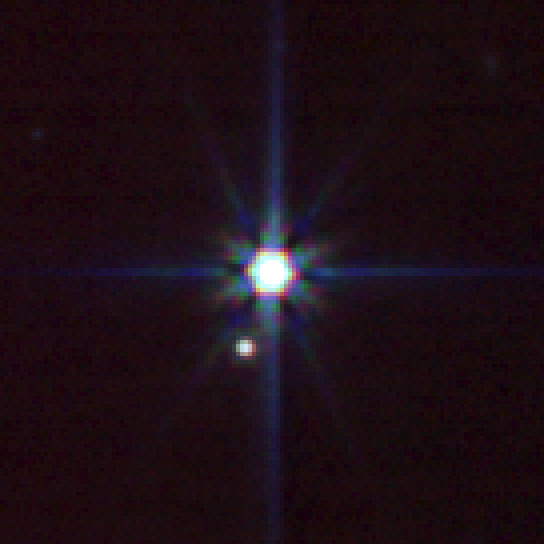
- GSC 06214-00210 b (lower left) with its host star, imaged by JWST/MIRI

Discovery
- Discovery date: 2010
- Detection method: Direct imaging

Orbital characteristics
- Semi-major axis: 320
- Orbital period (sidereal): 6037.4
- Star: GSC 06214-00210

Physical characteristics
- Mean radius: 1.8
- Mass: 16
- Temperature: 2200

GSC 06214-00210 b is a gas giant exoplanet orbiting the K-type star GSC 06214-00210 which is located approximately 356 light-years from Earth in the constellation Scorpius.

== Discovery ==
GSC 06214-00210 b, along with 1RXS J160929.1−210524 b, was first reported in 2010 as part of an adaptive optics imaging survey targeting wide companions (~50–500 AU) to solar-type stars in the Upper Scorpius association. The discovery paper, published in 2011, identified it as a ~14 Jupiter-mass companion and confirmed its comoving status with the host star. Follow-up spectroscopy observations in the same year refined its properties and also the spectral type of L0±1, with multiple signs of youth.

== Characteristics ==
Near-infrared spectroscopy revealed exceptionally strong Paschen β emission (equivalent width −11.4 ± 0.3 Å), indicating the presence of a circumplanetary accretion disk.

Subsequent studies have documented variability in the H I Paschen β emission line on timescales from minutes to decades, with moderate flux changes (<50%) on short scales and larger variations (up to ~1000%) over years, resembling classical T Tauri stars. There are line profiles for GSC 06214-00210 b and GQ Lupi b, and for GSC 06214-00210 b, they are consistent with both magnetospheric accretion and shock models, though shock models are favored in the brightest epochs.

== See also ==
- List of directly imaged exoplanets
