= HATS-36b =

Extrasolar planet in the constellation Sagittarius

HATS-36 b
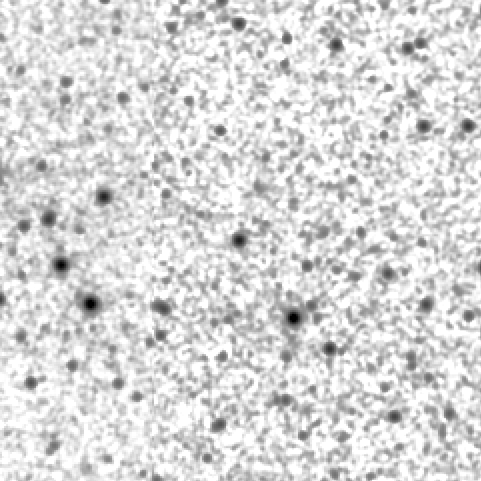
- An image of HATS-36 taken using the Kepler Space Telescope

Discovery
- Discovery date: June 12, 2017
- Detection method: Transit

Designations
- Alternative names: K2-145 b or EPIC 215969174b

Orbital characteristics
- Semi-major axis: 0.0529 (± 0.0011) AU
- Eccentricity: 0.105 ± 0.028
- Orbital period (sidereal): 4.17524 (± 2.1×10^{−6}) day
- Inclination: 87.57 (± 0.36)°
- Star: HATS-36

Physical characteristics
- Mean radius: 1.235 ± 0.043 RJ
- Mass: 2.79 ± 0.40 MJ

HATS-36b is a gas giant exoplanet that orbits an F-type star. Its mass is 3.216 Jupiters, it takes 4.2 days to complete one orbit of its star, and is 0.05425 AU from it. It was discovered on June 12, 2017 and was announced in 2018. Its discoverers were 23, namely Daniel Bayliss, Joel Hartman, George Zhou, Gaspar Á. Bakos, Andrew Vanderburg, J. Bento, L. Mancini, S. Ciceri, Rafael Brahm, Andres Jordán, N. Espinoza, M. Rabus, T. G. Tan, K. Penev, W. Bhatti, M. de Val-Borro, V. Suc, Z. Csubry, Th. Henning, P. Sarkis, J. Lázár, I. Papp, P. Sári.

== Host star ==
The exoplanet HATS-36 b which orbits the star HATS-36 is located about 3,186.5 light-years (977 parsecs) away from Solar System. It is situated in the constellation of Sagittarius. The host star HATS-36 has apparent magnitude of 14.4, with absolute magnitude of 4.4. The surface temperature is 5970 K with its spectral types of G0V class. In this planetary system, the extra-solar planet orbits around the star HATS-36 every 4.17524 days with its orbital distance of 0.05 AU (7.5 million km).

== Discovery ==
After the discovery of HATS-36b, it became one of the 25 HATSouth candidates on Campaign 7 of the K2 mission. It detects that the exoplanet, a hot Jupiter-like planet with a mass of 2.790.40 M_{J} and a radius of 1.2630.045 R_{J}, transits a solar-type G0V star (V = 14.386) in a 4.17524-day period. The planetary system of HATS-36 is classified as an eclipsing binary system based on a combination of the HATSouth data, the K2 data, and follow-up ground-based photometry and spectroscopy.

== Discussion ==
HATS-36b has a typical orbital period of 4.1752379 ± 0.0000021 days and has a density of 2.12 ± 0.20 g/cm^{3}. Its star is active, which can be seen and manifested in both the variability in the LC and the high jitters in the radial velocity measurements. Due to its high mass compared with the known population of hot Jupiters, HATS-36b lies in a relatively sparsely populated region of the mass-density relationship for gas giant exoplanets. However, its bulk density fits well on the mass-density sequence of the related exoplanets.

== See also ==
- List of potentially habitable exoplanets
- List of exoplanet firsts
- List of multiplanetary systems
- List of exoplanets discovered using the Kepler space telescope
- List of exoplanets observed during Kepler's K2 mission
- List of nearest terrestrial exoplanet candidates
