= HAT-P-28 =

Star in the constellation Andromeda

Observation data Epoch J2000 Equinox ICRS
- Constellation: Andromeda
- Right ascension: 00^{h} 52^{m} 00.1876^{s}
- Declination: +34° 43′ 42.205″
- Apparent magnitude (V): 13.03

Characteristics
- Evolutionary stage: main sequence
- Spectral type: G3

Astrometry
Radial velocity (R_{v})	48.06 km/s
Proper motion (μ)	RA: 25.615(14) mas/yr Dec.: 2.712(11) mas/yr
Parallax (π)	2.4728±0.0156 mas
Distance	1,319 ± 8 ly (404 ± 3 pc)

Orbit
Primary	HAT-P-28
Secondary	HAT-P-28 B
Semi-major axis (a)	0.994±0.002" (404 AU)

Details
Mass	1.02±0.05 M_{☉}
Radius	1.10^{+0.09}_{−0.07} R_{☉}
Luminosity	1.13^{+0.23}_{−0.16} L_{☉}
Surface gravity (log g)	4.36±0.06 cgs
Temperature	5680±90 K
Metallicity [Fe/H]	0.12±0.08 dex
Rotational velocity (v sin i)	0.2^{+0.5}_{−0.2} km/s
Age	6.1^{+2.6}_{−1.9} Gyr

Other designations
- GSC 02284-00503, 2MASS J00520018+3443422, Gaia DR2 363702817083391232

Database references
SIMBAD	data

HAT-P-28 is the primary of a binary star system about 1320 light-years away. It is a G-type main-sequence star. The star's age is older than the Sun's at 6.1^{+2.6}_{−1.9} billion years. HAT-P-28 is slightly enriched in heavy elements, having a 130% concentration of iron compared to the Sun. Evolutionary modelling shows it to be right at the end of its main sequence life. The binary star system is suspected to be surrounded by a debris disk with a 6.1″(2500 AU) radius.

The red dwarf stellar companion was detected in 2015 at a projected separation of 0.972″ and confirmed in 2016 to be either bound or co-moving.

== Planetary system ==
In 2011 a transiting hot Jupiter planet b was detected on a nearly circular orbit. The planetary equilibrium temperature is 1,384±52 K. No orbital decay was detected as in 2018, despite the close proximity of the planet to the host star.

The HAT-P-28 planetary system
Companion (in order from star)	Mass	Semimajor axis (AU)	Orbital period (days)	Eccentricity	Inclination (°)	Radius
b	0.626±0.037 M_{J}	0.0434±0.0007	3.257215±0.000007	0.051±0.033	88.0±0.9	1.190^{+0.102}_{−0.075} R_{J}
