= HD 180314 =

Star in the constellation Lyra

Observation data Epoch J2000 Equinox ICRS
- Constellation: Lyra
- Right ascension: 19^{h} 14^{m} 50.209^{s}
- Declination: +31° 51′ 37.26″
- Apparent magnitude (V): 6.61

Characteristics
- Evolutionary stage: red giant branch
- Spectral type: K0 III
- B−V color index: +1.000

Astrometry
Radial velocity (R_{v})	−73.87±0.20 km/s
Proper motion (μ)	RA: 46.844 mas/yr Dec.: 20.444 mas/yr
Parallax (π)	8.1261±0.0192 mas
Distance	401.4 ± 0.9 ly (123.1 ± 0.3 pc)
Absolute magnitude (M_{V})	0.931

Details
Mass	2.48±0.08 M_{☉}
Radius	8.4 R_{☉}
Luminosity	37 L_{☉}
Surface gravity (log g)	3.06±0.10 cgs
Temperature	4,910 K
Metallicity [Fe/H]	0.22±0.04 dex
Age	600±50 Myr

Other designations
- BD+31°3514, HD 180314, HIP 94576, SAO 68027

Database references
SIMBAD	data

HD 180314 is a star with an orbiting substellar companion in the northern constellation of Lyra. It is near the lower limit of visibility to the naked eye with an apparent visual magnitude of 6.61. The distance to this system is 401 light years based on parallax measurements, but it is drifting closer with a heliocentric radial velocity of −73.9 km/s. With high probability it is a member of the Hercules stream of co-moving stars.

This is an evolved K-type giant star with a stellar classification of K0 III. At the age of roughly 600 million years, it has exhausted the supply of hydrogen at its core and expanded away from the main sequence. It has 2.48 times the mass of the Sun and 8.4 times the Sun's radius. The star is radiating 37 times the luminosity of the Sun from its enlarged photosphere at an effective temperature of 4,910 K.

The star is orbited by one substellar companion, HD 180314 b, an object with a minimum mass 22 times that of Jupiter and hence likely to be a brown dwarf. It orbits HD 180314 every 396 days with a semi-major axis of 1.4 AU. HD 180314 b's orbit is moderately eccentric, with an orbital eccentricity of 0.257.

The HD 180314 planetary system
Companion (in order from star)	Mass	Semimajor axis (AU)	Orbital period (days)	Eccentricity	Inclination (°)	Radius
b	>22 M_{J}	1.4	396.03±0.62	0.257±0.010	—	—
