= HAT-P-21 =

Star in the constellation Ursa Major

Observation data Epoch J2000 Equinox J2000
- Constellation: Ursa Major
- Right ascension: 11^{h} 25^{m} 05.9859^{s}
- Declination: +41° 01′ 40.665″
- Apparent magnitude (V): 11.46

Characteristics
- Spectral type: G3

Astrometry
Radial velocity (R_{v})	−51.87±0.48 km/s
Proper motion (μ)	RA: −1.142(17) mas/yr Dec.: 13.523(24) mas/yr
Parallax (π)	3.5190±0.0228 mas
Distance	927 ± 6 ly (284 ± 2 pc)

Details
Mass	0.947±0.042 M_{☉}
Radius	1.105±0.083 R_{☉}
Luminosity	1.06^{+0.20}_{−0.16} L_{☉}
Surface gravity (log g)	4.33±0.06 cgs
Temperature	5634±67 K
Metallicity	0.04±0.08
Rotation	15.88±0.02 d
Rotational velocity (v sin i)	3.5±0.5 km/s
Age	10.2±2.5 Gyr

Other designations
- Mazaalai, HAT-P-21, TOI-1800, TIC 17993892, TYC 3013-1229-1, GSC 03013-01229, 2MASS J11250598+4101406

Database references
SIMBAD	data
Exoplanet Archive	data

HAT-P-21, also named Mazaalai, is a G-type main-sequence star about 927 light-years away. The star has amount of metals similar to solar abundance. The survey in 2015 has failed to detect any stellar companions. The star is rotating rapidly, being spun up by the tides of giant planet on close orbit.

== Naming ==
In 2019, the star HAT-P-21 received the proper name Mazaalai while its planet HAT-P-21b received the name Bambaruush in the international NameExoWorlds contest. These names refer to the Mongolian name for the endangered Gobi bear subspecies, and the Mongolian term for 'bear cub', respectively. Mazaalai was also the name of Mongolia's first satellite. Some IAU publications have misspelled the star's name as Mazalaai, but the latest IAU Catalog of Star Names lists Mazaalai.

== Planetary system ==
In 2010 a transiting hot super-Jovian planet on moderately eccentric orbit was detected. Its equilibrium temperature is 1283±50 K. The transit-timing variation survey in 2011 have failed to rule out or confirm the existence of additional planets in the system, until the orbital parameters of HAT-P-21b are known with better precision.

The planetary orbit is likely aligned with the equatorial plane of the star, misalignment equal to 25±16 degrees.

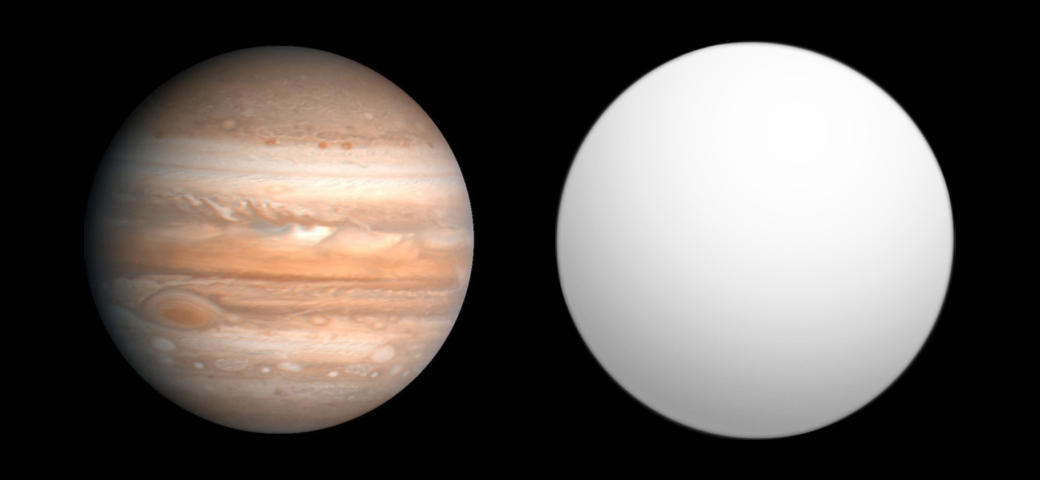
Size comparison of HAT-P-21 b and Jupiter

The HAT-P-21 planetary system
Companion (in order from star)	Mass	Semimajor axis (AU)	Orbital period (days)	Eccentricity	Inclination (°)	Radius
b (Bambaruush)	4.063±0.161 M_{J}	0.0494±0.0007	4.124481±0.000007	0.228±0.016	88.6	1.08±0.18 R_{J}
