= HAT-P-41 =

Star in the constellation Aquila

Observation data Epoch J2000 Equinox ICRS
- Constellation: Aquila
- Right ascension: 19^{h} 49^{m} 17.4398^{s}
- Declination: 04° 40′ 20.786″
- Apparent magnitude (V): 11.36

Characteristics

HAT-P-41
- Evolutionary stage: main sequence
- Spectral type: F9V

HAT-P-41B
- Spectral type: K9-M0

Astrometry
Radial velocity (R_{v})	33.2±0.5 km/s
Proper motion (μ)	RA: −3.177 mas/yr Dec.: −6.570 mas/yr
Parallax (π)	2.8477±0.0176 mas
Distance	1,145 ± 7 ly (351 ± 2 pc)

Position (relative to HAT-P-41)
Component	HAT-P-41B
Epoch of observation	2013
Angular distance	3.619±0.005″
Position angle	184.1±0.2°
Projected separation	1270 AU

Orbit
Primary	HAT-P-41 A
Secondary	HAT-P-41 B
Semi-major axis (a)	1,269 AU

Details
Mass	1.418±0.047 M_{☉}
Radius	1.683^{+0.058}_{−0.036} R_{☉}
Temperature	6390±100 K
Metallicity [Fe/H]	0.21±0.10 dex
Rotational velocity (v sin i)	19.60±0.50 km/s
Age	2.2±0.4 Gyr

Other designations
- TYC 488-2442-1, GSC 00488-02442, 2MASS J19491743+0440207
- HAT-P-41: Gaia DR2 4290415081653653632, Gaia DR3 4290415081653653632
- HAT-P-41B: Gaia DR2 4290415081653653376, Gaia DR3 4290415081653653376

Database references
SIMBAD	data
- Hat-P-41b

HAT-P-41 is a binary star system. Its primary is a F-type main-sequence star. Its surface temperature is 6390±100 K. compared to the Sun, HAT-P-41 is enriched in heavy elements, with a metallicity Fe/H index of 0.21±0.10, but is much younger at an age of 2.2±0.4 billion years.

The candidate stellar companion was detected simultaneously with the planet discovery in 2012. A multiplicity survey in 2015 did confirm a dim stellar companion of later-K to early-M spectral class, with the probability of being a background star of 14%. By 2020, it was concluded the candidate companion star is probably gravitationally bound.

== Planetary system ==
In 2012, one planet, named HAT-P-41b, was discovered on a tight, circular orbit around the primary star.

The planetary orbit is mildly misaligned with the equatorial plane of the star, misalignment angle equal to −22.1^{+0.8}_{−6.0} degrees.

The transmission spectrum of HAT-P-41b taken in 2020 has resulted in contradictory interpretations. One team has concluded the planetary atmosphere is metal-rich, with clear water signatures and absorption bands from sodium, aluminum, titanium and vanadium compounds. Another team has interpreted the results as arising from a dense hydrogen atmosphere without detectable heavy elements, but with significant ionization. The atmosphere also appears to contain significant cloud and hazes. Neither heavy element compounds nor H^{−} ion opacity were found in 2022 study.

The planetary equilibrium temperature is within 1700-1950 K, and the dayside temperature has been measured at 1622±125 K.

The HAT-P-41 planetary system
Companion (in order from star)	Mass	Semimajor axis (AU)	Orbital period (days)	Eccentricity	Inclination (°)	Radius
b	0.795^{+0.056}_{−0.091} M_{J}	0.04258^{+0.00047}_{−0.00048}	2.694047±0.000004	<0.22	87.7±1.0	1.685^{+0.076}_{−0.051} R_{J}
