= HAT-P-18 =

Star in the constellation Hercules

Observation data Epoch J2000 Equinox J2000
- Constellation: Hercules
- Right ascension: 17^{h} 05^{m} 23.1475^{s}
- Declination: +33° 00′ 44.940″
- Apparent magnitude (V): 12.759

Characteristics
- Evolutionary stage: main sequence
- Spectral type: K2

Astrometry
Radial velocity (R_{v})	−11.83 km/s
Proper motion (μ)	RA: −14.002(9) mas/yr Dec.: −36.751(11) mas/yr
Parallax (π)	6.1863±0.0093 mas
Distance	527.2 ± 0.8 ly (161.6 ± 0.2 pc)

Details
Mass	0.750^{+0.015}_{−0.014} M_{☉}
Radius	0.7202^{+0.0095}_{−0.01} R_{☉}
Luminosity	0.27±0.04 L_{☉}
Surface gravity (log g)	4.599±0.013 cgs
Temperature	4,835^{+39}_{−35} K
Metallicity	0.044^{+0.060}_{−0.051}
Rotation	14.66±0.03 d
Rotational velocity (v sin i)	0.5±0.5 km/s
Age	12.4^{+4.4}_{−6.4} Gyr

Other designations
- GSC 02594-00646, 2MASS J17052315+3300450, Gaia DR2 1334573817793362560

Database references
SIMBAD	data

HAT-P-18 is a K-type main-sequence star about 530 light-years away. The star is very old and has a concentration of heavy elements similar to solar abundance. A survey in 2015 detected very strong starspot activity on HAT-P-18.

== Planetary system ==
In 2010 a transiting hot Saturn-sized planet was detected. Its equilibrium temperature is 841 K.

In 2014, observations utilizing the Rossiter–McLaughlin effect detected an exoplanet, HAT-P-18b, on a retrograde orbit, with an angle between orbital plane of the planet and the parent star equatorial plane equal to 132±15°.

Transit-timing variation measurements in 2015 did not detect additional planets in the system.

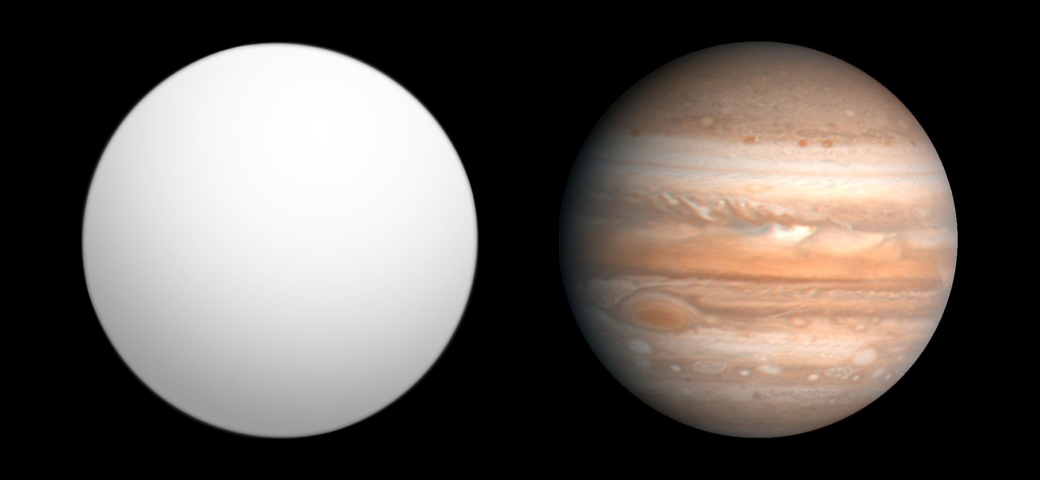
Size comparison of HAT-P-18 b and Jupiter

In 2016, the transmission optical spectra of the planet indicated that the atmosphere is lacking detectable clouds or hazes, and is blue in color due to Rayleigh scattering of light. The atmosphere seems to gradually evaporate, but at a slow rate - less than 2% of planetary mass is lost per one billion years. By contrast, spectra taken in 2022 showed extensive haze and clear evidence of water vapour, along with the tail of escaping helium.

The dayside temperature of HAT-P-18b was measured in 2019 to be 1004^{+78}_{−94} K.

The HAT-P-18 planetary system
Companion (in order from star)	Mass	Semimajor axis (AU)	Orbital period (days)	Eccentricity	Inclination (°)	Radius
b	0.183^{+0.034}_{−0.032} M_{J}	0.04649±	5.508029±0.0000042	0.106^{+0.15}_{−0.084}	88.79±0.21	0.947±0.044 R_{J}
