= HAT-P-65 =

Star in the constellation Equuleus

Observation data Epoch J2000 Equinox ICRS
- Constellation: Equuleus
- Right ascension: 21^{h} 03^{m} 37.3131^{s}
- Declination: +11° 59′ 21.820″
- Apparent magnitude (V): 13.16±0.02

Characteristics
- Evolutionary stage: subgiant
- Spectral type: G2IV
- B−V color index: +0.65

Astrometry
Radial velocity (R_{v})	−47.77±0.10 km/s
Proper motion (μ)	RA: 4.175(24) mas/yr Dec.: −6.263(16) mas/yr
Parallax (π)	1.3261±0.0353 mas
Distance	2,460 ± 70 ly (750 ± 20 pc)

Details
Mass	1.297+0.056 −0.053 M_{☉}
Radius	1.666(24) R_{☉}
Luminosity	2.97(12) L_{☉}
Surface gravity (log g)	4.1079+0.068 −0.074 cgs
Temperature	5872(40) K
Metallicity [Fe/H]	0.208+0.050 −0.055 dex
Rotational velocity (v sin i)	7.1±0.5 km/s
Age	3.9(8) Gyr

Other designations
- GSC 01111-00383, 2MASS J21033731+1159218, Gaia DR3 1757302881526250496

Database references
SIMBAD	data
Exoplanet Archive	data

HAT-P-65 is a faint star located in the equatorial constellation Equuleus. With an apparent magnitude of 13.16, it requires a telescope to be seen. The star is located 2,460 light-years (750 pc) away from Earth, but is drifting close with a radial velocity of -48 km/s.

== Properties ==
HAT-P-65 has a similar spectral type to that of the Sun. However, it is 21% more massive, and 86% larger than the latter. HAT-P-65 is slightly hotter, with an effective temperature of 5,916 K compared to 5,778 K of the Sun. It also has a higher luminosity and metallicity, with an iron content 26% greater than the Sun.

== Planetary system ==
In 2016, an inflated hot Jupiter was discovered orbiting the star in a tight 2 day orbit. No significant transit timing variations or evidence of orbital decay was found in a 2024 study by Kang et al.

The HAT-P-65 planetary system
Companion (in order from star)	Mass	Semimajor axis (AU)	Orbital period (days)	Eccentricity	Inclination (°)	Radius
b	0.554+0.092 −0.091 M_{J}	0.04042+0.00057 −0.00055	2.60544751(50)	0 (assumed)	88.3(1.0)	1.611(24) R_{J}
