= HAT-P-15 =

Star in the constellation Perseus

HAT-P-15 / Berehynia
Observation data Epoch J2000 Equinox J2000
- Constellation: Perseus
- Right ascension: 04^{h} 24^{m} 59.5350^{s}
- Declination: +39° 27′ 38.313″
- Apparent magnitude (V): 12.41

Characteristics
- Spectral type: G5
- Variable type: planetary transit

Astrometry
Radial velocity (R_{v})	+31.41±0.47 km/s
Proper motion (μ)	RA: +14.233±0.021 mas/yr Dec.: −9.407±0.015 mas/yr
Parallax (π)	5.1856±0.0166 mas
Distance	629 ± 2 ly (192.8 ± 0.6 pc)

Details
Mass	1.013±0.043 M_{☉}
Radius	1.080±0.039 R_{☉}
Luminosity	1.00±0.11 L_{☉}
Surface gravity (log g)	4.38±0.03 cgs
Temperature	5684±25 K
Metallicity	0.272±0.031
Rotational velocity (v sin i)	2.0±0.5 km/s
Age	6.8^{+2.5}_{−1.6} Gyr

Other designations
- Berehynia, TYC 2883-1687-1, GSC 02883-01687, 2MASS J04245952+3927382, Gaia DR3 179498266829041664

Database references
SIMBAD	data

HAT-P-15 is a G-type main-sequence star about 630 light-years away. The star is older than Sun yet has a concentration of heavy elements roughly 190% of solar abundance. The star has no noticeable starspot activity.

The spectroscopic survey in 2015 have failed to find any stellar companions to it, yet imaging survey have identified a possibly two companion red dwarf stars at projected separations 1210 and 1370 AU, respectively.

The star was named Berehynia in December 2019 by Ukrainian amateur astronomers.

== Planetary system ==
In 2010 a transiting hot superjovian planet b (named Tryzub in 2019) was detected. It has an equilibrium temperature of 904±20 K. An orbital simulation shows that any planets inward of the orbit of b would spiral inward and be destroyed within a time-span of less than a billion years. The planetary orbit is well aligned with the equatorial plane of the star, misalignment equal to 13±6 degrees.

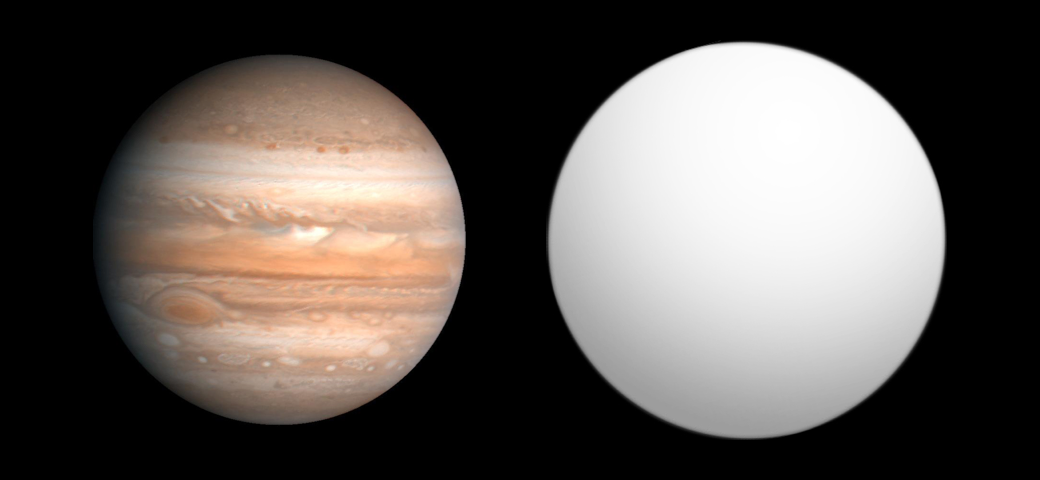
Size comparison of HAT-P-15 b and Jupiter

The HAT-P-15 planetary system
Companion (in order from star)	Mass	Semimajor axis (AU)	Orbital period (days)	Eccentricity	Inclination (°)	Radius
b / Tryzub	1.946±0.066 M_{J}	0.0964±0.0014	10.863502±0.000027	0.19±0.019	89.1±0.2	1.072±0.043 R_{J}
