= HAT-P-20 =

Star in the constellation Gemini

Observation data Epoch J2000 Equinox ICRS
- Constellation: Gemini
- Right ascension: 07^{h} 27^{m} 39.9489^{s}
- Declination: +24° 20′ 11.516″
- Apparent magnitude (V): 11.35

Characteristics
- Evolutionary stage: main sequence
- Spectral type: K3V

Astrometry
Radial velocity (R_{v})	-18.559 km/s
Proper motion (μ)	RA: −5.104(18) mas/yr Dec.: −96.090(16) mas/yr
Parallax (π)	14.0065±0.0176 mas
Distance	232.9 ± 0.3 ly (71.40 ± 0.09 pc)

Details
Mass	0.798±0.018 M_{☉}
Radius	0.744±0.011 R_{☉}
Luminosity	0.19 L_{☉}
Surface gravity (log g)	4.52±0.09 cgs
Temperature	4595±45 K
Metallicity	0.22±0.09
Rotation	14.66±0.03 d
Rotational velocity (v sin i)	2.0±0.5 km/s
Age	334 Myr

Other designations
- 2MASS J07273995+2420118, Gaia DR2 869913435026514688

Database references
SIMBAD	data

HAT-P-20 is a K-type main-sequence star about 233 light-years away. The star has a strong starspot activity, and its equatorial plane is misaligned by 36^{+10}_{−12}° with the planetary orbit. Although star with a giant planet on close orbit is expected to be spun-up by tidal forces, only weak indications of tidal spin-up were detected.

== Planetary system ==
In 2010 a transiting hot super-Jovian planet was detected. Its equilibrium temperature is 996±19 K.

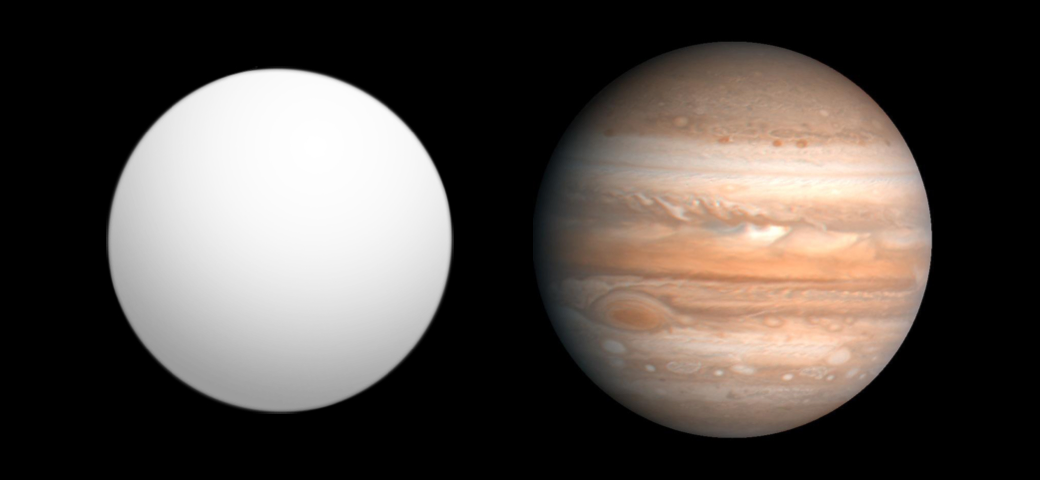
Size comparison of HAT-P-20 b and Jupiter

The HAT-P-20 planetary system
Companion (in order from star)	Mass	Semimajor axis (AU)	Orbital period (days)	Eccentricity	Inclination (°)	Radius
b	7.59±0.12 M_{J}	0.03671±0.00027	2.8753172±0.0000003	0.0172±0.0016	86.3±0.1	0.952±0.017 R_{J}
