= HAT-P-19 =

Star in the constellation Andromeda

Observation data Epoch J2000 Equinox J2000
- Constellation: Andromeda
- Right ascension: 00^{h} 38^{m} 04.0136^{s}
- Declination: +34° 42′ 41.554″
- Apparent magnitude (V): 12.901

Characteristics
- Evolutionary stage: main sequence
- Spectral type: K1

Astrometry
Radial velocity (R_{v})	−19.61±0.66 km/s
Proper motion (μ)	RA: −26.745(11) mas/yr Dec.: −32.568(10) mas/yr
Parallax (π)	4.9567±0.0137 mas
Distance	658 ± 2 ly (201.7 ± 0.6 pc)

Details
Mass	0.863^{+0.029}_{−0.025} M_{☉}
Radius	0.851±0.013 R_{☉}
Luminosity	0.37^{+0.08}_{−0.06} L_{☉}
Surface gravity (log g)	4.514^{+0.019}_{−0.017} cgs
Temperature	5049^{+42}_{−65} K
Metallicity	0.283^{+0.081}_{−0.079}
Rotation	14.66±0.03 d
Rotational velocity (v sin i)	0.7±0.5 km/s
Age	8.8±5.2 Gyr

Other designations
- 2MASS J00380401+3442416, Gaia DR2 3654266795168165128

Database references
SIMBAD	data

HAT-P-19 is a K-type main-sequence star about 658 light-years away. The star is old yet metal-enriched, having amount of heavy elements 250% of solar abundance. A survey in 2012 failed to find any stellar companions to HAT-P-19.

== Planetary system ==
In 2010 a transiting hot Saturn-sized planet was detected. Its equilibrium temperature is 984±10 K, and it is grey in color.

The transit-timing variation measurements in 2015 and 2018 did not detect additional planets in the system.

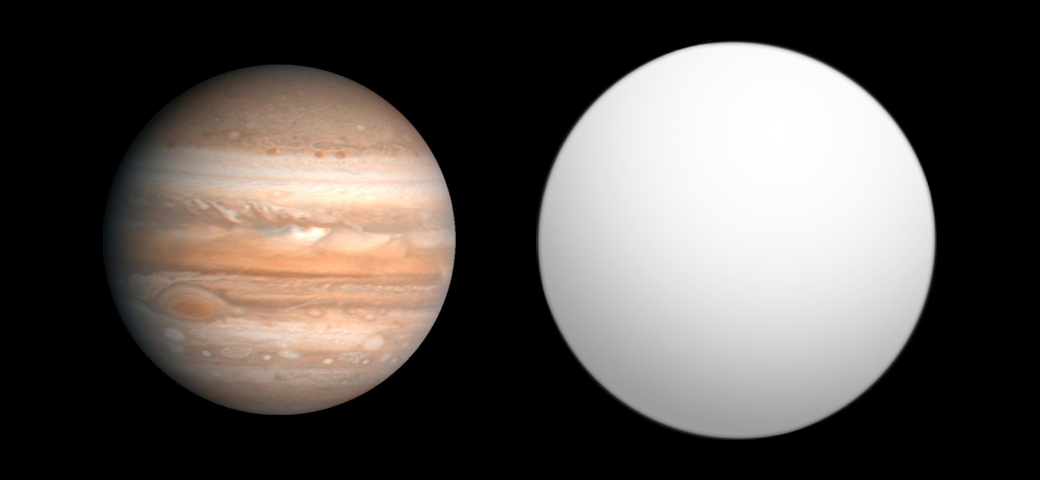
Size comparison of HAT-P-19 b and Jupiter

The HAT-P-19 planetary system
Companion (in order from star)	Mass	Semimajor axis (AU)	Orbital period (days)	Eccentricity	Inclination (°)	Radius
b	0.290±0.016 M_{J}	0.04649±	4.00878236^{+0.00000050}_{−0.00000049}	0.084±0.041	88.67^{+0.41}_{−0.25}	1.089±0.018 R_{J}
