= HAT-P-25 =

G-type main-sequence star

Observation data Epoch J2000 Equinox J2000
- Constellation: Aries
- Right ascension: 03^{h} 13^{m} 44.4981^{s}
- Declination: +25° 11′ 50.689″
- Apparent magnitude (V): 13.15

Characteristics
- Evolutionary stage: main sequence
- Spectral type: G5

Astrometry
Proper motion (μ)	RA: 13.490(21) mas/yr Dec.: −13.684(16) mas/yr
Parallax (π)	3.3128±0.0178 mas
Distance	985 ± 5 ly (302 ± 2 pc)

Details
Mass	1.012^{+0.051}_{−0.051} M_{☉}
Radius	0.919±0.034 R_{☉}
Luminosity	0.72 L_{☉}
Surface gravity (log g)	4.516^{+0.026}_{−0.025} cgs
Temperature	5,519^{+78}_{−76} K
Metallicity	0.29±0.08
Age	3.2±2.3 Gyr

Other designations
- TYC 320-1027-1, GSC 0320-01027, 2MASS J14123753+0403359, Gaia DR2 3668036348641580288

Database references
SIMBAD	data

HAT-P-25 is a G-type main-sequence star about 985 light-years away. It has a very low flare activity. The star is enriched in heavy elements, having about twice amount of metals compared to solar abundance.

== Planetary system ==
In 2010, a transiting hot Jupiter-like planet was detected. It has an equilibrium temperature of 1,182±25 K. The stability of orbits within circumstellar habitable zone is not significantly affected by the HAT-P-25b planet.

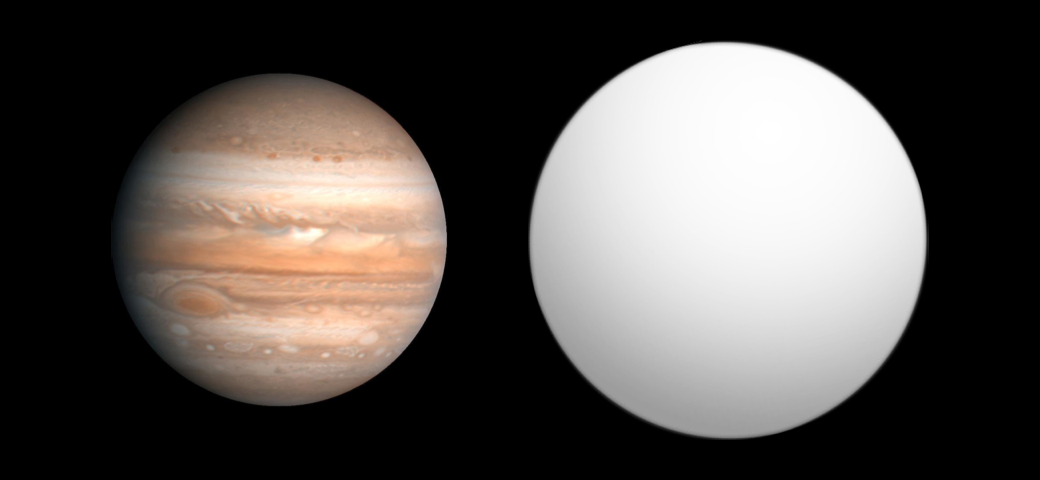
Size comparison of HAT-P-25 b and Jupiter

The HAT-P-25 planetary system
Companion (in order from star)	Mass	Semimajor axis (AU)	Orbital period (days)	Eccentricity	Inclination (°)	Radius
b	0.569^{+0.023}_{−0.022} M_{J}	0.0466±0.0005	3.65281514^{+0.00000076}_{−0.00000075}	0.023^{+0.022}_{−0.014}	87.6±0.5	1.135±0.048 R_{J}
