= HAT-P-23 =

Star in the constellation Delphinus

HAT-P-23 / Moriah
Observation data Epoch J2000 Equinox J2000
- Constellation: Delphinus
- Right ascension: 20^{h} 24^{m} 29.7235^{s}
- Declination: +16° 45′ 43.812″
- Apparent magnitude (V): 11.94

Characteristics
- Evolutionary stage: main sequence
- Spectral type: G0
- Apparent magnitude (J): 11.103±0.022
- Apparent magnitude (H): 10.846±0.022
- Apparent magnitude (K): 10.791±0.020
- Variable type: Planetary transit

Astrometry
Radial velocity (R_{v})	−16.67±0.88 km/s
Proper motion (μ)	RA: 13.325(11) mas/yr Dec.: −5.505(11) mas/yr
Parallax (π)	2.7358±0.0108 mas
Distance	1,192 ± 5 ly (366 ± 1 pc)

Details
Mass	1.13±0.035 M_{☉}
Radius	1.203±0.074 R_{☉}
Luminosity	1.58±0.23 L_{☉}
Surface gravity (log g)	4.33±0.05 cgs
Temperature	5905±80 K
Metallicity	0.15±0.04
Rotation	7.015 d
Rotational velocity (v sin i)	8.1±0.5 km/s
Age	4.0±1.0 Gyr

Other designations
- Moriah, TYC 1632-1396-1, GSC 01632-01396, 2MASS J20242972+1645437

Database references
SIMBAD	data
Exoplanet Archive	data

HAT-P-23 is a G-type main-sequence star 1192 light-years away. It has a rapid rotation (rotation period equal to 7 days) for its advanced age of 4 billion years, and exhibits a strong starspot activity. The star may be in the process of being spun up by the giant planet on close orbit. The star is enriched in heavy elements, having about 140% amount of metals compared to solar abundance.

== Naming ==
In 2019, the HAT-P-23 star has received a proper name Moriah and planet HAT-P-23b - Jebus at an international NameExoWorlds contest. These names mean the ancient name of the mount at the center of Jerusalem city, and ancient (pre-Roman) name of Jerusalem itself, respectively.

== Planetary system ==
In 2010, a transiting hot Jupiter-like planet was detected. It has a measured dayside temperature of 2154±90 K. The planet is believed to be on an unstable orbit, and expected to be engulfed by its parent star about 7.5^{+2.9}_{−1.8} million years from now, although timing measurements of multiple transits since the discovery have been unable to detect any reduction in the orbital period. The planetary orbit is probably aligned with the equatorial plane of the star, misalignment equal to 15±22°. The color of planetary atmosphere is grey. The atmosphere is mostly devoid of clouds, and shows tentatively a presence of titanium(II) oxide.

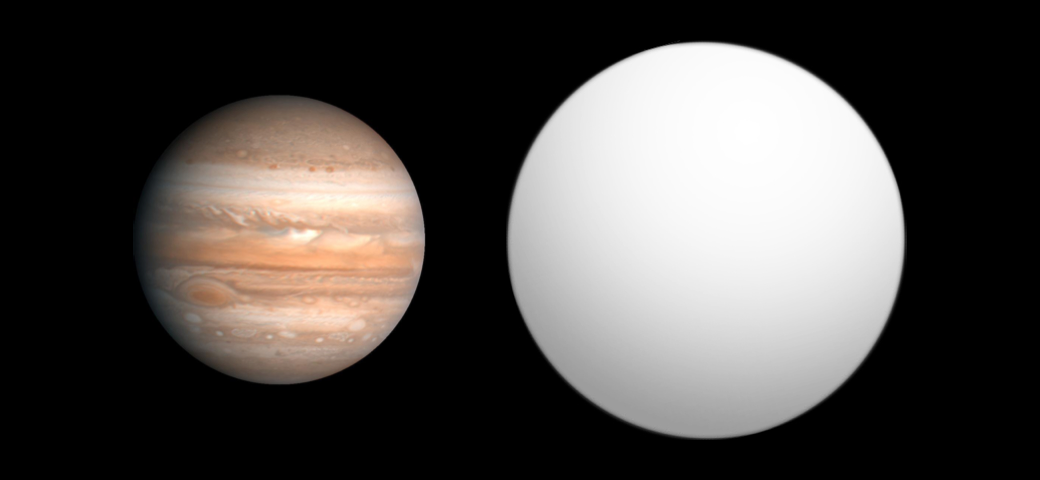
Size comparison of HAT-P-23 b and Jupiter

The HAT-P-23 planetary system
Companion (in order from star)	Mass	Semimajor axis (AU)	Orbital period (days)	Eccentricity	Inclination (°)	Radius
b (Jebus)	2.09±0.111 M_{J}	0.0232±0.0002	1.2128868±0.0000004	0.096	85.1±1.5	1.224±0.037 R_{J}
