= Rossiter–McLaughlin effect =

Spectroscopic phenomenon in astronomy

Animation of the Rossiter-Mclaughlin (RM) effect

The Rossiter–McLaughlin effect is a spectroscopic phenomenon observed when an object moves across the face of a rotating star. The star is seen to undergo a redshift anomaly caused by the obscuration of different parts of its disk.

== Description ==
The Rossiter–McLaughlin effect is a spectroscopic phenomenon observed when either an eclipsing binary's secondary star or an extrasolar planet is seen to transit across the face of the primary or parent star.

As the main star rotates on its axis, one quadrant of its photosphere will be seen to be coming towards the viewer, and the other visible quadrant to be moving away. These motions produce blueshifts and redshifts, respectively, in the star's spectrum, usually observed as a broadening of the spectral lines. When the secondary star or planet transits the primary, it blocks part of the latter's disc, preventing some of the shifted light from reaching the observer. That causes the observed mean redshift of the primary star as a whole to vary from its normal value. As the transiting object moves across to the other side of the star's disc, the redshift anomaly will switch from being positive to being negative, or vice versa.

The amplitude of the redshift anomaly depends on the mutual alignment between the primary star's equator and the secondary's path of transit. The maximum amplitude, which is determined by the primary's projected rotational velocity v sin i, is achieved when the two are perfectly aligned; the secondary will start transiting the primary at the part of the star's disc with maximum blueshift, and end the transit at maximum redshift. Misalignment between the two leads to a decrease in the Rossiter–McLaughlin effect which is proportional to the cosine of the angle.

The Rossiter–McLaughlin effect can only directly measure projected obliquity (typically indicated with λ) as it only measures the angle projected along the line of sight. For determination of the three-dimensional true obliquity (typically indicted with ψ), the projected obliquity needs to be combined with the values of inclination of the primary's equator obtained by comparing the projected rotational velocity with the true rotation period, and of the secondary's orbit obtained from the impact parameter of transit and/or doppler spectroscopy, which instead measure the inclination angle relative to the line of sight.

The viewer is situated at the bottom. Light from the anticlockwise-rotating star is blue-shifted on the approaching side, and red-shifted on the receding side. As the planet passes in front of the star it sequentially blocks blue- and red-shifted light, causing the star's apparent radial velocity to change, but it does not in fact change.

== Retrograde motion of "hot Jupiters" ==
This effect has been used to show that as many as 25% of hot Jupiters are orbiting in a retrograde direction with respect to their parent stars, strongly suggesting that dynamical interactions rather than planetary migration produce these objects if no additional processes are involved.

== History ==
J. R. Holt in 1893 proposed a method to measure the stellar rotation of stars by using radial velocity measurements. He predicted that when one star of an eclipsing binary eclipsed the other, it would first cover the advancing blueshifted half and then the receding redshifted half. That motion would create a redshift of the eclipsed star's spectrum followed by a blueshift, which would thus appear as a change in the measured radial velocity in addition to that caused by the orbital motion of the eclipsed star.

The effect is named after Richard Alfred Rossiter and Dean Benjamin McLaughlin.
