= WASP-132 =

Star in constellation Lupus

- Approximate location of WASP-132 (circled)

Observation data Epoch J2000.0 Equinox ICRS
- Constellation: Lupus
- Right ascension: 14^{h} 30^{m} 26.18966^{s}
- Declination: −46° 09′ 33.1234″
- Apparent magnitude (V): 11.938

Characteristics
- Evolutionary stage: main sequence
- Spectral type: K4V
- J−H color index: 0.512
- J−K color index: 0.583
- Variable type: Planetary transit variable

Astrometry
Radial velocity (R_{v})	31.55±0.45 km/s
Proper motion (μ)	RA: 12.255 mas/yr Dec.: −73.169 mas/yr
Parallax (π)	8.0924±0.019 mas
Distance	403.0 ± 0.9 ly (123.6 ± 0.3 pc)

Details
Mass	0.782±0.034 M_{☉}
Radius	0.753+0.028 −0.026 R_{☉}
Luminosity	0.253+0.032 −0.028 L_{☉}
Surface gravity (log g)	4.576+0.028 −0.036 cgs
Temperature	4714+87 −88 K
Metallicity [Fe/H]	0.18±0.12 dex
Rotation	33 d
Rotational velocity (v sin i)	0.90±0.80 or 3.3±0.6 km/s
Age	3.2±0.5 or 7.2+4.3 −4.4 Gyr

Other designations
- TOI-822, TIC 127530399, WASP-132, 2MASS J14302619-4609330, Gaia DR3 6099012478412247296

Database references
SIMBAD	data
Exoplanet Archive	data

WASP-132 is a star located about 403 light-years (124 parsecs) away in the constellation of Lupus. It is known to be orbited by two exoplanets and one more awaiting confirmation. With an apparent magnitude of 11.938, it is far too faint to be visible by the naked eye from Earth, but can be observed using a 60-mm aperture telescope as an orangish star.

== Stellar characteristics ==
WASP-132 is a K-type main-sequence star with a spectral type of K4V, corresponding to its effective temperature of 4,714 K (4,441 °C; 8,026 °F). It is about three-fourths as large as the Sun both in radius and mass, and radiates roughly a quarter of the luminosity of the Sun from its photosphere. The star is metal-rich with a metallicity (Fe/H) of 0.18±0.12 dex. Its age estimate varies wildly between publications from 3.2±0.5 Gyr to 7.2+4.3
−4.4 Gyr. The same goes for its rotational velocity, with presented values of 0.90±0.80 km/s and 3.3±0.6 km/s.

In 2017, a hot Jupiter exoplanet (b) was discovered to orbit the star, followed by a hot super-Earth (c) in 2022 and a cold super-Jupiter (d) in 2024. This makes WASP-132 one of the only stars with planets both near a hot Jupiter and much farther out, alongside WASP-47.

== Planetary system ==
The WASP-132 planetary system
Companion (in order from star)	Mass	Semimajor axis (AU)	Orbital period (days)	Eccentricity	Inclination (°)	Radius
c	6.26+1.84 −1.83 M_{🜨}	0.01833±0.00079	1.01153624+0.00000093 −0.00000086	—	88.82+0.67 −0.69	1.841+0.094 −0.093 R_{🜨}
b	0.428±0.015 M_{J}	0.0674±0.0029	7.1335164±0.0000019	0.0163+0.069 −0.067	89.46+0.13 −0.11	0.901±0.038 R_{J}
d	≥5.16±0.52 M_{J}	2.71±0.12	1816.6±44.4	0.120±0.078	—	—

=== WASP-132b ===
In 2017, the discovery of WASP-132b was announced alongside that of six other hot Jupiters. It was found through the analysis of transit photometry data obtained between May 2006 and June 2012 by WASP-South at the South African Astronomical Observatory, and was subsequently confirmed by radial velocity observations by the Swiss 1.2-metre Leonhard Euler Telescope's CORALIE spectrograph (March 2014 – March 2016) and transit photometry observations at TRAPPIST (5 May 2014).

The planet is relatively small for a hot Jupiter, having a mass less than half of Jupiter's and a radius 10% smaller. Due to the host star's dimness, it was the second least irradiated hot Jupiter discovered by WASP at the time of discovery, with an equilibrium temperature of 763±16 K (490 °C; 914 °F); only WASP-59b was colder at 670±35 K (397 °C; 746 °F).

=== WASP-132c ===
From TESS observations conducted in 2019, a new transit signal was found to occur every 1.01153 days (24.277 h), which was confirmed to be caused by a planet with a radius 1.85 times that of Earth in 2022. Archived radial velocity data from CORALIE and subsequent observations with HARPS indicate that the mass of the planet is approximately 6.26+1.84
−1.83 M_{🜨}, corresponding to a bulk density of 5.47+1.96
−1.71 g⋅cm^{−3}, consistent with an Earth-like composition.

The existence of this planet implies that the nearby WASP-132b is improbable to have formed via high-eccentricity migration, the way most hot-Jupiters form. This scenario involves a giant planet that formed beyond the ice line falling into an eccentric orbit due to gravitational perturbations, which takes the planet closer to the star. Over time, the orbit circularizes much closer in than the original orbit. This is deemed unlikely to have happened to WASP-132b, since the migration would leave other nearby planets scattered or even ejected from the system as the eccentric Jupiter sweeps the vicinity of its orbit clean with its gravitational influence.

=== WASP-132d ===
In June 2024, an additional planet was reported to have been discovered in a 1,800-day (4.9-year) orbit with a semi-major axis of 2.71 AU, much farther out than the previous two planets and roughly where the main belt would be in the Solar System. This planet was discovered via doppler spectroscopy (aka the radial velocity method), through the analysis of CORALIE and HARPS radial velocity data, taking into account the Rossiter-McLaughlin effect caused by the other two planets. This planet has a minimum mass of 5.16 M_{J}, easily making it a super-Jupiter.

=== Possible distant companion ===
In WASP-132d's discovery paper, also described is a linear trend in the CORALIE radial velocity curves, hinting at the existence of an object located even farther out. Should it exist, it would have a minimum mass of roughly 18.5 M_{J}, likely making it a brown dwarf or low-mass star, and orbit WASP-132 with a period of >18 years.

== See also ==
- WASP-84
