= Optical Mechanics, Inc. =

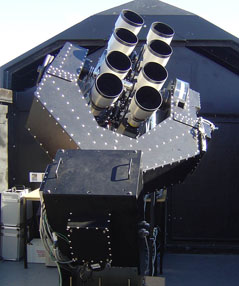
SuperWASP cameras are mounted on an OMI equatorial mount

Optical Mechanics, Inc. or OMI is a high-end American telescope and optics instrument manufacturer. OMI was founded in 2002 and produces observatory telescopes, Lidar telescopes, optical tube assemblies, telescope mirrors and reflective coatings for mirrors. OMI mirrors are used by other telescope makers such as Obsession Telescopes. Also taking on custom projects, they produced the 48-inch Dob, a 48.875-inch-diameter (1,241.4 mm) aperture, f/4, Dobsonian telescope called "Barbarella" and featured in Astronomy Technology Today magazine (June 2008 Issue). OMI is located in the US state of Iowa. OMI procured the assets of the former optics company Torus Technologies. OMI has an optics shop where it does work on telescopes.

OMI produced the 60 cm, f/10 telescope for TUBITAK National Observatory in Turkey. OMI built the telescope mount for the SuperWASP telescope. The Robotic telescope Rigel Telescope was finished in 2002, a Talon program controlled 0.37-meter (14.5 in) F/14 telescope.

OMI helped re-furbish the Gueymard Research Telescope at The George Observatory at Brazos Bend State Park. The telescope's mirror was degrading after many decades of use and exposure. The 10 ton 36 inch aperture telescope was acquired from Louisiana State University in 1990. It is a cassegrain telescope, and one of the largest that is open to public viewing through an eyepiece. OMI had to strip off aluminum coating and re-surface the glass mirror. The mirror was ground to a hyperbolic shape, and the refurbishment was conducted in 2014.

OMI refitted the 0.8 m telescope at McDonald Observatory in 2011 to 2012. Another telescope OMI built was the CESAR Cebreros Optical Telescope at Cebreros observatory at the ESA Deep Space Tracking Station The telescope is a Cassegrain design with 50cm and a F/10 ratio. (see also Cebreros Station)

== OMI Evolution-30 ==
OMI developed the 30-inch mirror for Obsession Telescopes's 30-inch reflector When Obsession withdrew from the 30-inch market, OMI still wanted to offer their 30-inch mirrors. Drawing on help from Obsession Telescopes and their own experience with the OMI 48-inch telescope, they offered the OMI Evolution-30 in 2009.
