= Wouri =

Wouri may refer to several places:

- Wouri (department), a division of the Littoral Province in Cameroon
- Wouri River, a river in Cameroon
- Wouri estuary, a large tidal estuary in Cameroon
- Wouri (star) or WASP-69, a star in the constellation Aquarius
