= WASP-35 =

Star in the constellation Eridanus

Observation data Epoch J2000 Equinox ICRS
- Constellation: Eridanus
- Right ascension: 05^{h} 04^{m} 19.6323^{s}
- Declination: −06° 13′ 47.378″
- Apparent magnitude (V): 10.94

Characteristics
- Evolutionary stage: main sequence
- Spectral type: F9V or G1V

Astrometry
Radial velocity (R_{v})	17.90±0.29 km/s
Proper motion (μ)	RA: 20.758(15) mas/yr Dec.: 10.963(11) mas/yr
Parallax (π)	4.9411±0.0160 mas
Distance	660 ± 2 ly (202.4 ± 0.7 pc)

Details
Mass	1.106±0.015 M_{☉}
Radius	1.122±0.016 R_{☉}
Luminosity	1.4 L_{☉}
Surface gravity (log g)	4.381±0.011 cgs
Temperature	6072±63 K
Metallicity [Fe/H]	−0.051±0.051 dex
Rotational velocity (v sin i)	3.9±0.4 km/s
Age	5.0±1.2 Gyr

Other designations
- BD−06 1077, TOI-423, TIC 43647325, WASP-35, TYC 4762-714-1, GSC 04762-00714, 2MASS J05041962-0613473

Database references
SIMBAD	data
Exoplanet Archive	data

WASP-35 is a G-type main-sequence star about 660 light-years away. The star's age cannot be well constrained, but it is probably older than the Sun. WASP-35 is similar in concentration of heavy elements compared to the Sun.

The star has no detectable starspot activity. An imaging survey in 2015 found no detectable stellar companions, although a spectroscopic survey in 2016 yielded a suspected red dwarf companion with a temperature of 3800±1100 K.

== Planetary system ==
In 2011 a transiting hot Jupiter planet, WASP-35b, was detected. The planet's equilibrium temperature is 1450±20 K.

The WASP-35 planetary system
Companion (in order from star)	Mass	Semimajor axis (AU)	Orbital period (days)	Eccentricity	Inclination (°)	Radius
b	0.765±0.029 M_{J}	0.0436±0.0002	3.1615691(3)	<0.028	87.95±0.33	1.349±0.022 R_{J}
