= WASP-94 =

Binary star system

Observation data Epoch J2000 Equinox ICRS
- Constellation: Microscopium
- A
- Right ascension: 20^{h} 55^{m} 07.94435^{s}
- Declination: −34° 08′ 08.0075″
- Apparent magnitude (V): 10.1
- B
- Right ascension: 20^{h} 55^{m} 09.15767^{s}
- Declination: −34° 08′ 07.9138″
- Apparent magnitude (V): 10.5

Characteristics

A
- Evolutionary stage: main sequence
- Spectral type: F8

B
- Evolutionary stage: subgiant
- Spectral type: F9

Astrometry

A
Radial velocity (R_{v})	−8.36±0.19 km/s
Proper motion (μ)	RA: +26.500 mas/yr Dec.: −44.971 mas/yr
Parallax (π)	4.7498±0.0242 mas
Distance	687 ± 3 ly (211 ± 1 pc)

B
Radial velocity (R_{v})	−8.30±0.20 km/s
Proper motion (μ)	RA: +26.191 mas/yr Dec.: −44.702 mas/yr
Parallax (π)	4.7208±0.0165 mas
Distance	691 ± 2 ly (211.8 ± 0.7 pc)

Details

A
Mass	1.45±0.09 M_{☉}
Radius	1.62+0.05 −0.04 R_{☉}
Luminosity	3.2 L_{☉}
Surface gravity (log g)	4.21±0.011 cgs
Temperature	6194±5 K
Metallicity [Fe/H]	+0.320±0.004 dex
Rotation	19.5 d
Rotational velocity (v sin i)	4.2±0.5 km/s
Age	2.3–2.8 Gyr

B
Mass	1.24±0.09 M_{☉}
Radius	1.35±0.12 R_{☉}
Luminosity	2.2 L_{☉}
Surface gravity (log g)	4.30±0.015 cgs
Temperature	6112±6 K
Metallicity [Fe/H]	+0.305±0.005 dex
Rotation	>45.5 d
Rotational velocity (v sin i)	<1.5 km/s
Age	2.3–2.8 Gyr

Other designations
- CD−34 14724, WASP-94, HJ 5234
- A: TOI-107, TIC 92352620, TYC 7466-1400-1, 2MASS J20550794-3408079
- B: TIC 92352621, 2MASS J20550915-3408078

Database references
SIMBAD	A
- B
Exoplanet Archive	data

WASP-94 is a binary star system located about 690 light-years (210 parsecs) away in the constellation Microscopium. It consists of two F-type stars separated by 15″, corresponding to a projected separation of 2700 au. Both stars are known to host exoplanets.

The binary system was first observed by John Herschel in 1834 and catalogued as HJ 5234. The designation WASP-94 comes from the Wide Angle Search for Planets, and has been used since the system was found to host planets in 2014. While the two stars have similar spectral types, they differ in elemental abundance – WASP-94A has fewer volatile elements and more refractory elements than WASP-94B.

== Planetary system ==
The two stars host a single known planet each. Both are hot Jupiters, gas giant planets completing orbits around their stars in just a few days.

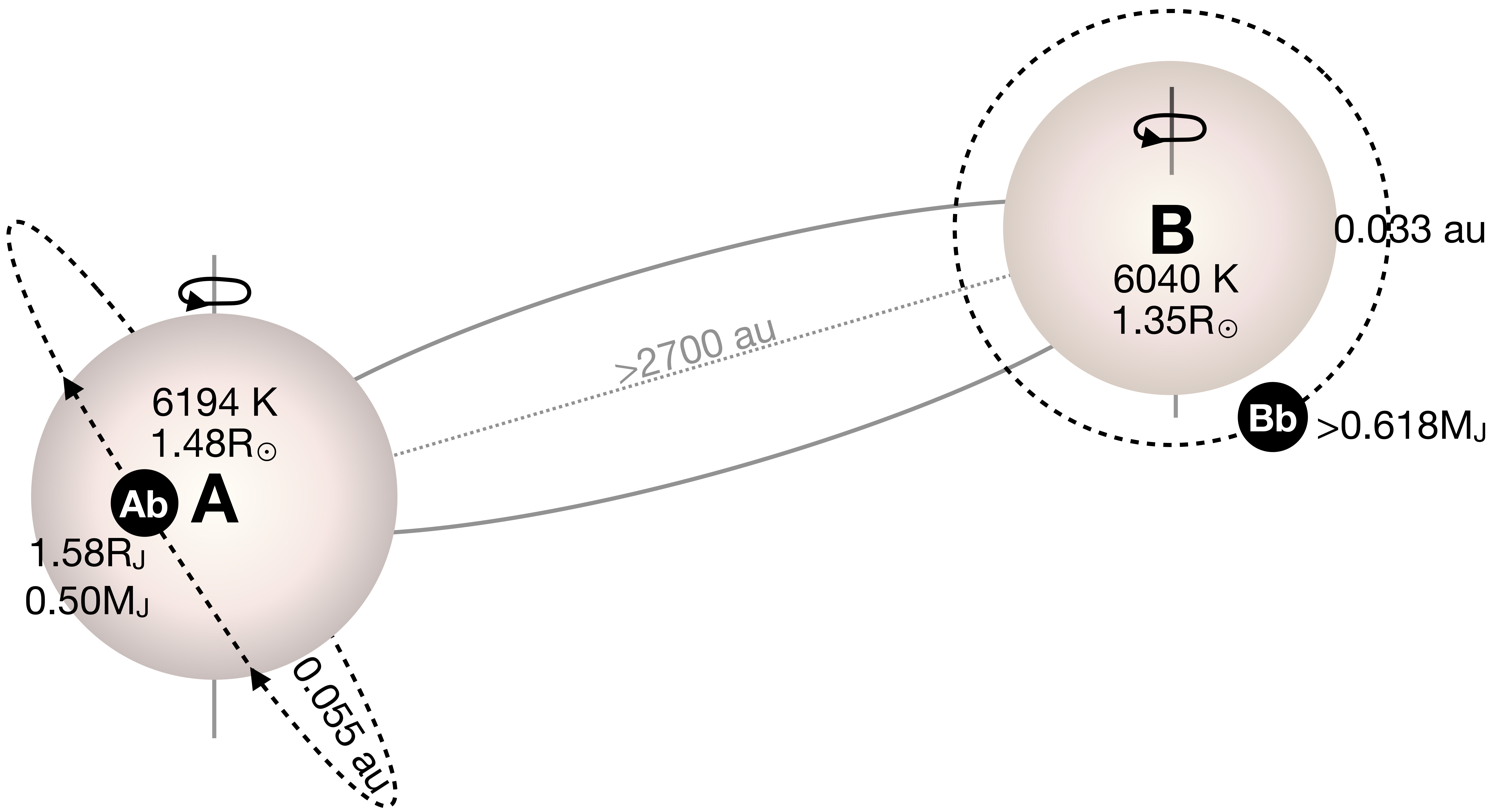
Diagram of the WASP-94 system

WASP-94Ab transits its host star, and it has also been detected by the radial velocity method. As a result, both its size and mass are known, which show that it is a low-density planet with a highly inflated radius. It has an equilibrium temperature of 1508±75 K. Its orbit is retrograde and misaligned with the rotation of its host star. The atmosphere of WASP-94Ab appears to be relatively free of clouds, with sodium, water vapor and carbon dioxide being detected.

WASP-94Bb is a non-transiting planet that has been detected only by radial velocity, so it has no measured radius and true mass. Its minimum mass is 62% the mass of Jupiter.

The WASP-94 A planetary system
Companion (in order from star)	Mass	Semimajor axis (AU)	Orbital period (days)	Eccentricity	Inclination (°)	Radius
b	0.452+0.035 −0.032 M_{J}	0.055±0.001	3.9501907+0.0000044 −0.0000030	<0.064	88.7±0.7	1.72+0.06 −0.05 R_{J}

The WASP-94 B planetary system
Companion (in order from star)	Mass	Semimajor axis (AU)	Orbital period (days)	Eccentricity	Inclination (°)	Radius
b	≥0.618+0.028 −0.029 M_{J}	0.0335+0.0006 −0.0005	2.00839±0.00024	0	—	—

== See also ==
Other systems with multiple planet-hosting stars:

- 55 Cancri
- HD 20781 & HD 20782
- HD 133131
- XO-2
- Struve 2398
