= WASP-29 =

Star in the constellation Phoenix

Observation data Epoch J2000 Equinox ICRS
- Constellation: Phoenix
- Right ascension: 23^{h} 51^{m} 31.08391^{s}
- Declination: −39° 54′ 24.2582″
- Apparent magnitude (V): 11.33

Characteristics

WASP-29A
- Evolutionary stage: main sequence star
- Spectral type: K4V
- B−V color index: 0.82
- J−H color index: 0.478
- J−K color index: 0.570

WASP-29B
- Spectral type: M3V

Astrometry
Radial velocity (R_{v})	24.31±0.20 km/s
Proper motion (μ)	RA: −56.767(14) mas/yr Dec.: −88.988(13) mas/yr
Parallax (π)	11.4349±0.0151 mas
Distance	285.2 ± 0.4 ly (87.5 ± 0.1 pc)

Position (relative to WASP-29A)
Component	WASP-29B
Epoch of observation	2021
Angular distance	125.2″
Projected separation	10994 AU

Details

WASP-29A
Mass	0.825±0.033 M_{☉}
Radius	0.808±0.044 R_{☉}
Surface gravity (log g)	4.5±0.2 cgs
Temperature	4800±150 K
Metallicity [Fe/H]	0.11±0.14 dex
Rotational velocity (v sin i)	1.50±0.60 km/s
Age	14+0 −7 Gyr

WASP-29B
Mass	0.38 M_{☉}

Other designations
- CD−40 15273, TOI-192, TIC 183537452, WASP-29, TYC 8015-1020-1, 2MASS J23513108-3954241, DENIS J235131.0-395423
- WASP-29A: Gaia DR3 6534414719318886144
- WASP-29B: Gaia DR3 6534426740931264896

Database references
SIMBAD	data
Exoplanet Archive	data

WASP-29 is a binary star system 285 light-years (87 parsecs) away in the constellation of Phoenix. The primary star is a K-type main-sequence star. Its comoving companion, a red dwarf star, was discovered in 2021. The star system kinematically belongs to the thin disk of the Milky Way. The primary is an old star with small starspot activity and low x-ray flux.

== Planetary system ==
The "hot Saturn" class planet WASP-29b was discovered around WASP-29 in 2010. The planet would have an equilibrium temperature of 960±30 K. The planetary atmosphere has abundant carbon monoxide but likely lacks methane and sodium, although the high and dense cloud deck of WASP-29b prevents high-quality spectroscopic measurements.

A study in 2018 revealed the stability of planetary orbits in the habitable zone of WASP-29 is significantly affected by the WASP-29b planet.

The WASP-29 planetary system
Companion (in order from star)	Mass	Semimajor axis (AU)	Orbital period (days)	Eccentricity	Inclination (°)	Radius
b	0.243+0.020 −0.019 M_{J}	0.0470±0.0025	3.92271218(25)	<0.059	89.468+0.018 −0.017	0.775±0.031 R_{J}
