= WASP-71 =

F-class main sequence star in the constellation Cetus

Observation data Epoch J2000 Equinox J2000
- Constellation: Cetus
- Right ascension: 01^{h} 57^{m} 03.204^{s}
- Declination: +00° 45′ 31.88″
- Apparent magnitude (V): 10.56

Characteristics
- Evolutionary stage: main sequence
- Spectral type: F8
- B−V color index: 0.896

Astrometry
Radial velocity (R_{v})	7.690±0.004 km/s
Proper motion (μ)	RA: 23.418 mas/yr Dec.: −6.844 mas/yr
Parallax (π)	2.8158±0.0265 mas
Distance	1,160 ± 10 ly (355 ± 3 pc)

Details
Mass	1.53^{+0.07}_{−0.06} M_{☉}
Radius	2.17^{+0.18}_{−0.10} R_{☉}
Surface gravity (log g)	3.944^{+0.036}_{−0.050} cgs
Temperature	6,050±100 K
Metallicity [Fe/H]	0.15±0.07 dex
Rotational velocity (v sin i)	7.8±0.3 km/s
Age	3.6^{+1.6}_{−1.0} Gyr

Other designations
- Mpingo, BD+00 316, TOI-388, TIC 422655579, WASP-71, TYC 30-116-1, 2MASS J01570320+0045318

Database references
SIMBAD	data
Exoplanet Archive	data

WASP-71, also named Mpingo, is an ordinary star with a close-orbiting planetary companion in the equatorial constellation of Cetus. With an apparent visual magnitude of 10.56, it is too faint to be visible to the naked eye. This star is located at a distance of 1,160 light-years based on parallax measurements, and is drifting further away with a heliocentric radial velocity of 7.7 km/s.

This is classified as an F-type star with a stellar classification of F8. It is more than double the diameter of the Sun with 1.5 times the Sun's mass. The star is younger than the Sun at about 3.6 billion years, yet is already evolving away from the main sequence. BD+00 316 is enriched in heavy elements, having 140% of the solar abundance of iron. Imaging surveys in 2015 and 2020 failed to find any stellar companions for BD+00 316.

== Nomenclature ==
The designation WASP-71 comes from the Wide Angle Search for Planets and has been used since 2012; BD+00 316 is the stellar identifier from the Bonner Durchmusterung catalogue.

The star was named Mpingo by Tanzanian amateur astronomers in 2020 as part of the NameExoWorlds contest, after the mpingo tree (Dalbergia melanoxylon) whose wood is a type of ebony used in musical instruments.

== Planetary system ==
In 2012 a transiting superjovian planet, designated WASP-71b, was detected on a tight, circular orbit. The planetary orbit is well aligned with the equatorial plane of the star, the misalignment angle being equal to −1.9^{+7.1}_{−7.5}°. Its equilibrium temperature is 2,016.1^{+67.0}_{−52.5} K.

The planet was named Tanzanite by Tanzanian amateur astronomers in 2020 as part of the NameExoWorlds contest, after the mineral also known as tanzanite.

The WASP-71 planetary system
Companion (in order from star)	Mass	Semimajor axis (AU)	Orbital period (days)	Eccentricity	Inclination (°)	Radius
b (Tanzanite)	2.14±0.08 M_{J}	0.0460±0.0006	2.903676±0.000008	<0.019	85.8^{+2.4}_{−2.1}	1.35^{+0.13}_{−0.07} R_{J}
