= WASP-25 =

Star in the constellation Hydra

Observation data Epoch J2000 Equinox ICRS
- Constellation: Hydra
- Right ascension: 13^{h} 01^{m} 26.3760^{s}
- Declination: −27° 31′ 19.922″
- Apparent magnitude (V): 11.87

Characteristics
- Evolutionary stage: main sequence
- Spectral type: G4

Astrometry
Radial velocity (R_{v})	−2.698±0.0028 km/s
Proper motion (μ)	RA: −29.264 mas/yr Dec.: −6.196 mas/yr
Parallax (π)	4.6501±0.0230 mas
Distance	701 ± 3 ly (215 ± 1 pc)

Details
Mass	1.053±0.038 M_{☉}
Radius	0.924±0.018 R_{☉}
Luminosity	0.89 L_{☉}
Surface gravity (log g)	4.530±0.015 cgs
Temperature	5,736±50 K
Metallicity [Fe/H]	0.06±0.05 dex
Rotational velocity (v sin i)	2.9±0.3 km/s
Age	0.10+5.70 −0.10 Gyr

Other designations
- TOI-767, TIC 229047362, WASP-25, TYC 6706-861-1, 2MASS J13012637-2731199, DENIS J130126.3-273120

Database references
SIMBAD	data
Exoplanet Archive	data

WASP-25 is a G-type main-sequence star about 701 light-years away in the constellation of Hydra.

== Star characteristics ==
WASP-25 is slightly metal-poor (85% of Solar amount) and is probably a young star which has just entered the main sequence.

== Planetary system ==
The hot Jupiter class planet WASP-25b was discovered around WASP-25 in 2010. The planet would have an equilibrium temperature of 1212±35 K. A Rossiter-McLaughlin effect based study in 2011 found a modest misalignment of the planetary orbit to the rotational axis of the parent star, equal to 14.6±6.7 degrees. A habitability study in 2018 found WASP-25b does not adversely affect the stability of planetary orbits in the habitable zone of WASP-25.

The WASP-25 planetary system
Companion (in order from star)	Mass	Semimajor axis (AU)	Orbital period (days)	Eccentricity	Inclination (°)	Radius
b	0.574±0.042 M_{J}	0.04738±0.00047	3.7648327(9)	<0.083	88.12±0.27	1.247±0.032 R_{J}
