= WASP-36 =

Star in the constellation Hydra

Observation data Epoch J2000 Equinox ICRS
- Constellation: Hydra
- Right ascension: 08^{h} 46^{m} 19.2977^{s}
- Declination: −08° 01′ 37.016″
- Apparent magnitude (V): 12.7

Characteristics
- Evolutionary stage: main sequence
- Spectral type: G2V
- B−V color index: 0.4
- J−H color index: 0.256
- J−K color index: 0.315

Astrometry
Radial velocity (R_{v})	−12.45±0.97 km/s
Proper motion (μ)	RA: −4.040 mas/yr Dec.: −8.502 mas/yr
Parallax (π)	2.6493±0.0129 mas
Distance	1,231 ± 6 ly (377 ± 2 pc)

Details
Mass	1.03^{+0.033}_{−0.036} M_{☉}
Radius	0.966^{+0.013}_{−0.014} R_{☉}
Luminosity	1.202^{+0.089}_{−0.081} L_{☉}
Surface gravity (log g)	4.4807^{+0.0086}_{−0.0085} cgs
Temperature	6150^{+110}_{−100} K
Metallicity [Fe/H]	−0.26±0.10 dex
Rotational velocity (v sin i)	3.3±1.2 km/s
Age	1.01^{+1.1}_{−0.68} Gyr

Other designations
- TOI-567, TIC 13349647, WASP-36, 2MASS J08461929-0801370, DENIS J084619.3-080136

Database references
SIMBAD	data
Exoplanet Archive	data

WASP-36 is a G-type main-sequence star about 1,230 light-years away in the constellation Hydra.

== Star characteristics ==
WASP-36 is a yellow main sequence star of spectral class G2, similar to the Sun. It has a candidate stellar companion with apparent magnitude 14.03, seemingly confirmed in 2019 using Gaia DR2 data.

== Planetary system ==
In 2010, the SuperWASP survey found the hot Jupiter class planet WASP-36b using the transit method. Its temperature was measured to be 1705±44 K. The planetary transmission spectrum taken in 2016 has turned out to be anomalous: the planet appears to be surrounded by a blue-tinted halo that is too wide to be an atmosphere and may represent a measurement error.

The planetary dayside temperature measured in 2020 is 1440^{+150}_{−160} K.

The WASP-36 planetary system
Companion (in order from star)	Mass	Semimajor axis (AU)	Orbital period (days)	Eccentricity	Inclination (°)	Radius
b	2.281+0.070 −0.071 M_{J}	0.02635+0.00028 −0.00031	1.53736533(14)	0.0087+0.0097 −0.0061	83.42+0.12 −0.11	1.270+0.018 −0.019 R_{J}
