= WASP-20 =

Star in the constellation Cetus

Observation data Epoch J2000 Equinox J2000
- Constellation: Cetus
- Right ascension: 00^{h} 20^{m} 38.53504^{s}
- Declination: −23° 56′ 08.6028″
- Apparent magnitude (V): 10.779

Characteristics
- Evolutionary stage: main sequence
- Spectral type: F9V

Astrometry
| Radial velocity (R_{v}) | 1.26±0.85 km/s |
| Proper motion (μ) | RA: +1.352 mas/yr Dec.: −14.739 mas/yr |
| Parallax (π) | 3.4699±0.7095 mas |
| Distance | approx. 900 ly (approx. 290 pc) |

Details
| Mass | 1.09 M_{☉} |
| Radius | 1.14 R_{☉} |
| Surface gravity (log g) | 4.36 cgs |
| Temperature | 5,940±100 K |
| Metallicity [Fe/H] | −0.008±0.060 dex |
| Rotational velocity (v sin i) | 4.75±0.51 km/s |
| Age | 3.6 Gyr |

Other designations
- CD−24 102, TOI-194, TIC 211438925, WASP-20, TYC 6413-439-1, GSC 06413-00439, 2MASS J00203853-2356086

Database references
| SIMBAD | data |
| Exoplanet Archive | data |

WASP-20, also known as CD-24 102, is a binary star system in the equatorial constellation Cetus, located at a distance of about 940 light-years (290 parsecs) from the Sun. The primary star is an F-type main sequence star and hosts one confirmed exoplanet, WASP-20b.

== Stellar properties ==
WASP-20 is a star of spectral type F9, aged 3.6 billion years. Its mass is 10.09+0.05
−0.02 solar masses for a radius of 1.14+0.08
−0.01 solar radii, or a density of 0.73±0.17 grams per cubic centimeter.

== Planetary system ==
WASP-20b is a transiting hot Jupiter discovered in 2014. WASP-20b orbits WASP-20 in less than five Earth days very close to its star (0.06 AU) in a circular (near-zero eccentricity) orbit. The orbit is inclined by 85.56°±0.22° relative to the plane of the sky and is thus edge-on, as necessary for a transit to be observed.

The WASP-20 planetary system
| Companion (in order from star) | Mass | Semimajor axis (AU) | Orbital period (days) | Eccentricity | Inclination (°) | Radius |
|---|---|---|---|---|---|---|
| b | 0.311+0.019 −0.018 M_{J} | 0.05999+0.00069 −0.00068 | 4.8996284(33) | <0.039 | 85.56±0.22 | 1.462±0.059 R_{J} |

== See also ==
- Wide Angle Search for Planets
- Lists of planets
