= WASP-50 =

Star in the constellation Eridanus

WASP-50 / Chaophraya
Observation data Epoch J2000 Equinox ICRS
- Constellation: Eridanus
- Right ascension: 02^{h} 54^{m} 45.1342^{s}
- Declination: −10° 53′ 53.025″
- Apparent magnitude (V): 11.44

Characteristics
- Evolutionary stage: main sequence
- Spectral type: G9V

Astrometry
Radial velocity (R_{v})	25.76±0.69 km/s
Proper motion (μ)	RA: 3.383(20) mas/yr Dec.: 8.913(17) mas/yr
Parallax (π)	5.4865±0.0174 mas
Distance	594 ± 2 ly (182.3 ± 0.6 pc)

Details
Mass	0.892+0.08 −0.074 M_{☉}
Radius	0.843±0.031 R_{☉}
Luminosity	0.6 L_{☉}
Surface gravity (log g)	4.5±0.1 cgs
Temperature	5,400±100 K
Metallicity	−0.12±0.08
Rotation	16.30±0.50 d
Rotational velocity (v sin i)	2.6±0.5 km/s
Age	8.57±2.86 Gyr

Other designations
- Chaophraya, TOI-391, TIC 382391899, WASP-50, TYC 5290-462-1, GSC 05290-00462, 2MASS J02544513-1053530

Database references
SIMBAD	data
Exoplanet Archive	data

WASP-50, also named Chaophraya, is a G-type main-sequence star about 594 light-years away in the constellation Eridanus. The star is older than the Sun and slightly depleted in heavy elements compared to the Sun, and has a close to average starspot activity. Despite its advanced age, the star is rotating rapidly, being spun up by the tides raised by a giant planet on a close orbit.

== Nomenclature ==
The designation WASP-50 comes from Wide Angle Search for Planets, a consortium of academic organisations detecting exoplanets using the transit method.

This was one of the systems selected to be named in the 2019 NameExoWorlds campaign during the 100th anniversary of the IAU, which assigned each country a star and planet to be named. This system was assigned to Thailand. The approved names were Chaophraya for the star and Maeping for the planet, after the Chao Phraya and Mae Ping rivers in Thailand. The Thai names Chaophraya (เจ้าพระยา) and Maeping (แม่ปิง) were proposed by Duangrat Wichiansri (ดวงรัตน์ วิเชียรศรี) following a national vote conducted by NARIT in 2019,

== Planetary system ==
In 2011 a transiting hot superjovian planet, WASP-50b (named Maeping in 2019) was detected. In 2022 its albedo was found to be no more than 0.44, meaning that the planet reflects less than 44% of the light irradiated by its host star. This allows the planetary equilibrium temperature to be constrained at 1393±42 K.

The WASP-50 planetary system
Companion (in order from star)	Mass	Semimajor axis (AU)	Orbital period (days)	Eccentricity	Inclination (°)	Radius
b / Maeping	1.437±0.068 M_{J}	0.0293±0.0013	1.955100±0.000005	0.009+0.011 −0.006	84.88±0.27	1.138±0.026 R_{J}
