= WASP-72 =

Star in the constellation Fornax

WASP-72 / Diya
Observation data Epoch J2000.0 Equinox ICRS
- Constellation: Fornax
- Right ascension: 02^{h} 44^{m} 09.60960^{s}
- Declination: −30° 10′ 08.5637″
- Apparent magnitude (V): 10.96

Characteristics
- Spectral type: F7
- Apparent magnitude (B): 11.454
- Apparent magnitude (R): 10.47
- Apparent magnitude (I): 10.428

Astrometry
| Radial velocity (R_{v}) | 36.20±0.31 km/s |
| Proper motion (μ) | RA: +7.614 mas/yr Dec.: −7.673 mas/yr |
| Parallax (π) | 2.3889±0.0252 mas |
| Distance | 1,370 ± 10 ly (419 ± 4 pc) |

Orbit
| Primary | WASP-72 |
| Name | WASP-72B |
| Semi-major axis (a) | 0.639±0.003" (281 AU) |

Details

WASP-72
| Mass | 1.386±0.055 M_{☉} |
| Radius | 1.98±0.24 R_{☉} |
| Luminosity | 5.3+1.5 −1.3 L_{☉} |
| Surface gravity (log g) | 4.08±0.13 cgs |
| Temperature | 6250±100 K |
| Metallicity [Fe/H] | −0.06±0.09 dex |
| Rotational velocity (v sin i) | 6.0±0.7 km/s |
| Age | 3.55±0.82 Gyr |

WASP-72B
| Mass | 0.66±0.02 M_{☉} |
| Temperature | 4234^{+80}_{−81} K |

Other designations
- Diya, CD−30 1019, TOI-264, TIC 122612091, WASP-72, TYC 7011-487-1, 2MASS J02440959-3010085

Database references
| SIMBAD | data |
| Exoplanet Archive | data |

WASP-72 (also known as CD-30 1019 and officially named Diya) is the primary of a binary star system. It is an F7 class dwarf star, with an internal structure just on the verge of the Kraft break. It is orbited by a planet, WASP-72b. The age of WASP-72 is younger than the Sun at 3.55±0.82 billion years.

The primary seems to have UV-opaque matter in the line-of-sight, which may originate from atmosphere escaping from WASP-72b or from an unknown object in the interstellar medium. WASP-72 was named Diya in 2019.

A faint stellar companion WASP-72B was discovered in 2020 at a projected separation of 281 AU. It may still be a false positive, with a probability of 0.02%.

== Planetary system ==
The transiting hot Jupiter exoplanet orbiting WASP-72 was discovered by WASP in 2012. The planetary orbit is well aligned to the equatorial plane of the star, with misalignment equal to −7°+11°
−12°. Despite the close proximity of the planet to the parent star, orbital decay was not detected as of 2020. The planetary equilibrium temperature is 2210^{+120}_{−130} K, compatible with the measured dayside temperature of 2098^{+335}_{−364} K.

WASP-72b was named "Cuptor" in 2019 by Mauritian amateur astronomers as part of the NameExoWorlds contest.

The WASP-72 planetary system
| Companion (in order from star) | Mass | Semimajor axis (AU) | Orbital period (days) | Eccentricity | Inclination (°) | Radius |
|---|---|---|---|---|---|---|
| b / Cuptor | 1.446+0.054 −0.053 M_{J} | 0.03711+0.00048 −0.00051 | 2.2167421(81) | <0.017 | 79.9+1.6 −1.3 | 1.24±0.15 R_{J} |
