= Wide Angle Search for Planets =

Exoplanet search project

SuperWASP
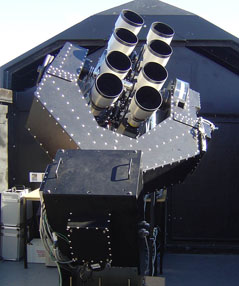
- SuperWASP-South cameras on Optical Mechanics, Inc. equatorial mount
- Alternative names: Wide Angle Search for Planets
- Location: Spain, South Africa
- Coordinates: 28°45′37″N 17°52′45″W
- Website: www.superwasp.org
- Location within Africa
- Related media on Commons

WASP or Wide Angle Search for Planets is an international consortium of several academic organisations performing an ultra-wide angle search for exoplanets using transit photometry. The array of robotic telescopes aims to survey the entire sky, simultaneously monitoring many thousands of stars at an apparent visual magnitude from about 7 to 13.

WASP is the detection program composed of the Isaac Newton Group, IAC and six universities from the United Kingdom. The two continuously operating, robotic observatories cover the Northern and Southern Hemisphere, respectively. SuperWASP-North is at Roque de los Muchachos Observatory on the mountain of that name which dominates La Palma in the Canary Islands. WASP-South is at the South African Astronomical Observatory, Sutherland in the arid Roggeveld Mountains of South Africa. These use eight wide-angle cameras that simultaneously monitor the sky for planetary transit events and allow the monitoring of millions of stars simultaneously, enabling the detection of rare transit events.

Instruments used for follow-up characterization employing doppler spectroscopy to determine the exoplanet's mass include the HARPS spectrograph of ESO's 3.6-metre telescope as well as the Swiss Euler Telescope, both located at La Silla Observatory, Chile. WASP's design has also been adopted by the Next-Generation Transit Survey. As of 2016, the Extrasolar Planets Encyclopaedia data base contains a total of 2,107 extrasolar planets of which 118 were discoveries by WASP.

== Equipment ==
WASP consists of two robotic observatories; SuperWASP-North at Roque de los Muchachos Observatory on the island of La Palma in the Canaries and WASP-South at the South African Astronomical Observatory, South Africa. Each observatory consists of an array of eight Canon 200 mm f1.8 lenses backed by high quality 2048 × 2048 science-grade CCDs, the model used is the iKon-L manufactured by Andor Technology. The telescopes are mounted on an equatorial telescope mount built by Optical Mechanics, Inc. The large field of view of the Canon lenses gives each observatory a massive sky coverage of 490 square degrees per pointing.

== Function ==
The observatories continuously monitor the sky, taking a set of images approximately once per minute, gathering up to 100 gigabytes of data per night. By using the transit method, data collected from WASP can be used to measure the brightness of each star in each image, and small dips in brightness caused by large planets passing in front of their parent stars can be searched for.

One of the main purpose of WASP was to revolutionize the understanding of planet formation, paving the way for future space missions searching for 'Earth'-like worlds.

== Structure ==
WASP is operated by a consortium of academic institutions which include:

- Instituto de Astrofisica de Canarias
- Isaac Newton Group of Telescopes
- Keele University
- Open University
- Queen's University Belfast
- St. Andrews University
- University of Leicester
- Warwick University.

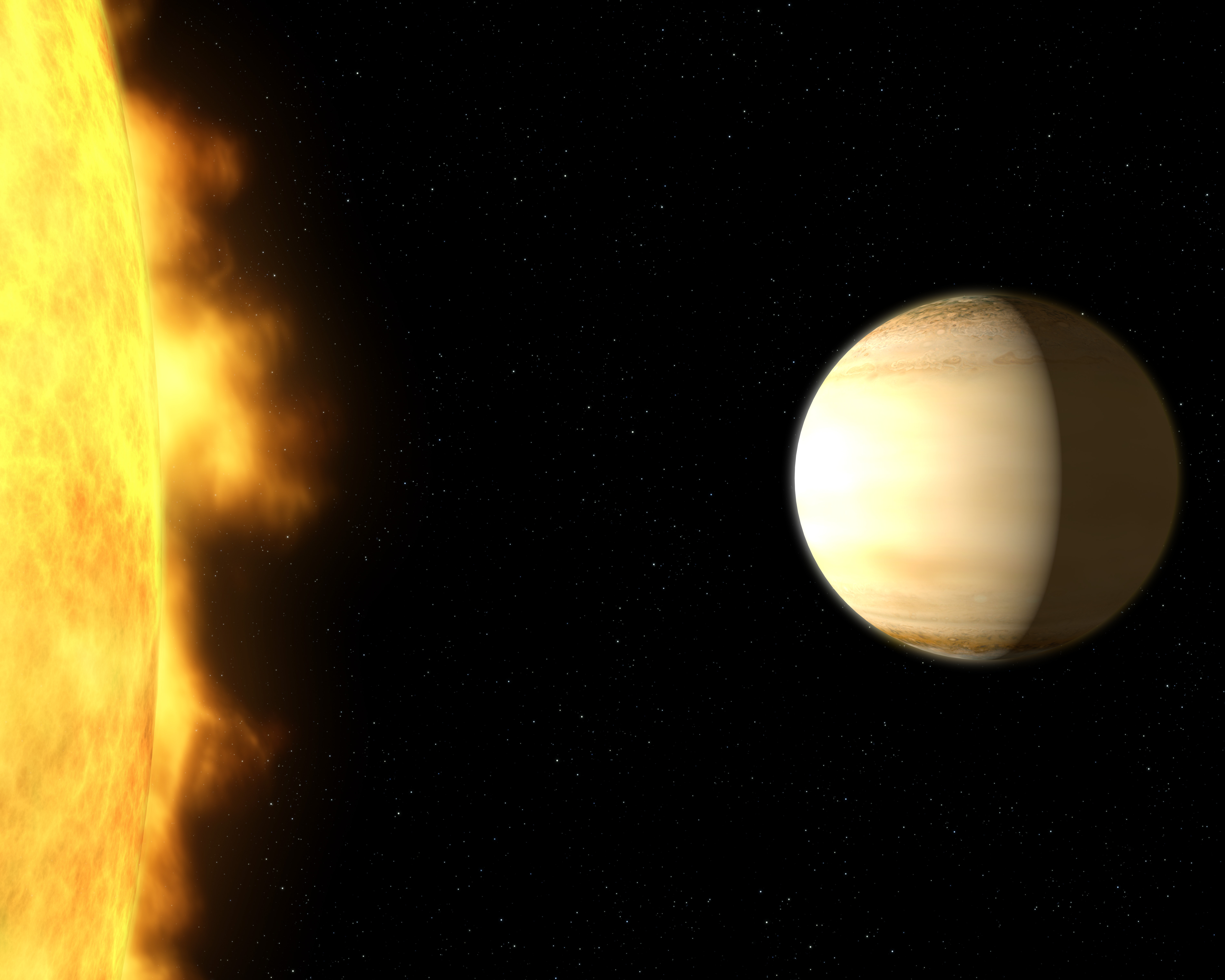
WASP-39b and its parent star (artist's impression).

On 26 September 2006, the team reported the discovery of two extrasolar planets: WASP-1b (orbiting at 0.038 AU (6 million km) from star once every 2.5 days) and WASP-2b (orbiting three-quarters that radius once every 2 days).

On 31 October 2007, the team reported the discovery of three extrasolar planets: WASP-3b, WASP-4b and WASP-5b. All three planets are similar to Jovian mass and are so close to their respective stars that their orbital periods are all less than two days. These are among the shortest orbital periods discovered. The surface temperatures of the planets should be more than 2000 degrees Celsius, owing to their short distances from their respective stars. The WASP‑4b and WASP-5b are the first planets discovered by the cameras and researchers in South Africa. WASP-3b is the third planet discovered by the equivalent in La Palma.

In August 2009, the discovery of WASP-17b was announced, believed to be the first planet ever discovered to orbit in the opposite direction to the spin of its star, WASP-17.

== Discoveries and follow-up observations ==
=== Exoplanets ===
Star	Constellation	Right ascension	Declination	App. mag.	Distance (ly)	Spectral type	Planet	Mass (M_{J})	Radius (R_{J})	Orbital period (d)	Semimajor axis (AU)	Orbital eccentricity	Inclination (°)	Discovery year
WASP-1	Andromeda	00^{h} 20^{m} 40^{s}	+31° 59′ 24″	11.79	1031	F7V	b	0.86	1.484	2.5199464	0.0382	0	88.65	2006
WASP-2	Delphinus	20^{h} 30^{m} 54^{s}	+06° 25′ 46″	11.98	493	K1V	b	0.847	1.079	2.15222144	0.03138	0	84.73	2006
WASP-3	Lyra	18^{h} 33^{m} 32^{s}	+35° 39′ 42″	10.64	727	F7V	b	2.06	1.454	1.8468372	0.0313	0	85.06	2007
WASP-4	Phoenix	23^{h} 34^{m} 15^{s}	−42° 03′ 41″	12.6	851	G7V	b	1.1215	1.363	1.33823187	0.02312	0	88.8	2007
WASP-5	Phoenix	23^{h} 57^{m} 24^{s}	−41° 16′ 38″	12.26	967	G4V	b	1.58	1.09	1.6284296	0.02683	0	85.8	2007
Márohu	Aquarius	23^{h} 12^{m} 37^{s}	−22° 40′ 06″	12.4	1001	G8V	Boinayel	0.5	1.3	3.36	0.0269	0.054	88.47	2008
WASP-7	Microscopium	20^{h} 44^{m} 10^{s}	−39° 13′ 31″	9.51	460	F5V	b	0.96	0.915	4.954658	0.0618	0	89.6	2008
WASP-8	Sculptor	23^{h} 59^{m} 36.07^{s}	−35° 01′ 52.9″	9.9	160	G6	b	2.23	1.17	8.16	0.0793	0.3082	88.52	2008
WASP-8	Sculptor	23^{h} 59^{m} 36.07^{s}	−35° 01′ 52.9″	9.9	160	G6	c	9.45		4323	5.28	0		2014
WASP-10	Pegasus	23^{h} 15^{m} 58^{s}	+31° 27′ 46″	12.7	290	K5	b	3.06	1.08	3.0927616	0.0371	0.057	86.8	2008
WASP-11/HAT-P-10	Perseus	03^{h} 09^{m} 29^{s}	+30° 40′ 25″	11.89	408	K3V	b	0.460	1.045	3.7224690	0.0439	0	88.5	2008
WASP-12	Auriga	06^{h} 30^{m} 32.794^{s}	+29° 40′ 20.29″	11.7	871	G0V	b	1.404	1.736	1.0914222	0.02293	0	86	2008
Gloas	Lynx	09^{h} 20^{m} 24.71^{s}	+33° 52′ 57.0″	10.7	509	G1V	Cruinlagh	0.485	1.365	4.353011	0.05379	0	85.64	2008
WASP-14	Boötes	14^{h} 33^{m} 06^{s}	+21° 53′ 41″	9.75	520	F5V	b	7.725	1.259	2.2437704	0.037	0.0903	84.79	2008
Nyamien	Hydra	13^{h} 55^{m} 42.71^{s}	−32° 09′ 34.6″	10.9	1005	F5	Asye	0.54	1.16	3.75	0.0472	0	85.5	2008
WASP-16	Virgo	14^{h} 18^{m} 43.92^{s}	−20° 16′ 31.8″	11.3	520	G3V	b	0.855	1.008	3.12	0.0421	0	85.22	2009
Dìwö	Scorpius	15^{h} 59^{m} 51^{s}	−28° 03′ 42″	11.6	1000	F6	Ditsö̀	0.486	1.991	3.735438	0.0515	0.028	86.83	2009
WASP-18	Phoenix	01^{h} 37^{m} 24.95^{s}	−45° 40′ 40.8″	9.29	330	F9	b	10.3	1.106	0.94145299	0.02026	0.0092	86	2009
Wattle	Vela	09^{h} 43^{m} 40.077^{s}	−45° 39′ 33.06″	12.3	815	G8V	Banksia	1.168	1.386	0.78884	0.01655	0.0046	79.4	2009
WASP-20	Cetus	00^{h} 20^{m} 38.53^{s}	−23° 56′ 08.6″	10.7	685	F9	b	0.31	1.459	4.9	0.06003		85.57	2011
Tangra	Pegasus	23^{h} 09^{m} 58.23^{s}	+18° 23′ 46.0″	11.6	750	G3V	Bendida	0.3	1.21	4.322506	0.052	0	87.29	2010
Tojil	Eridanus	03^{h} 31^{m} 16.32^{s}	−23° 49′ 11.0″	12.0	980	G1	Koyopa'	0.588	1.158	3.5327313	0.04698	0	88.26	2010
WASP-23	Puppis	06^{h} 44^{m} 31^{s}	−42° 45′ 43″	12.7	671.1	K1V	b	0.884	0.962	2.9444256	0.0376	< 0.062	88.39	2010
WASP-24	Virgo	15^{h} 08^{m} 51.72^{s}	+02° 20′ 36.1″	11.3	1080	F8-9	b	1.03	1.10	2.341	0.0359	0	85.71	2010
WASP-25	Hydra	13^{h} 01^{m} 26.36^{s}	−27° 31′ 20.0″	11.9	550	G4	b	0.58	1.26	3.765	0.0487	0	87.7	2010
WASP-26	Cetus	00^{h} 18^{m} 24.70^{s}	−15° 16′ 02.3″	11.3	815	G0	b	1.028	1.281	2.7566004	0.03985	0	82.91	2010
WASP-27/HAT-P-14	Hercules	17^{h} 20^{m} 27.8^{s}	+38° 14′ 31.9″	10	731.2	F5	b	2.44	1.101	4.6	0.060	0.1074	84.1167	2010
WASP-28	Pisces	23^{h} 34^{m} 27.87^{s}	−01° 34′ 48.1″	12	1090	F8	b	1.12	0.91	3.409	0.0455	0.046	88.61	2010
WASP-29	Phoenix	23^{h} 51^{m} 31.08^{s}	−39° 54′ 24.2″	11.3	260	K4V	b	0.25	0.74	3.923	0.0456	0	87.96	2010
WASP-31	Crater	11^{h} 17^{m} 45^{s}	−19° 03′ 17″	11.7	1305	F	b	0.478	1.537	3.405909	0.04657	0	84.54	2010
Parumleo	Pisces	00^{h} 15^{m} 51^{s}	+01° 12′ 02″	11.3		G	Viculus	3.6	1.18	2.71865	0.0394	0.018	85.3	2010
WASP-33	Andromeda	02^{h} 26^{m} 51.05^{s}	+37° 33′ 01.7″	8.3	378	A5	b	< 4.59	1.438	1.21986967	0.02558	0	87.67	2010
Amansinaya	Crater	11^{h} 01^{m} 36^{s}	−23° 51′ 38″	10.4	391	G5	Haik	0.59	1.22	4.3176782	0.0524	0.038	85.2	2010
WASP-35	Eridanus	5^{h} 4^{m} 19.63^{s}	−6° 13′ 47.36″	10.94	663	G0V	b	0.72	1.32	3.161575	0.04317	0	87.96	2011
WASP-36	Hydra	08^{h} 45^{m} 19.0^{s}	−08° 01′ 37″	12.7	1468	G2	b	2.279	1.269	1.53737	0.02624		83.65	2010
WASP-37	Virgo	14^{h} 47^{m} 46.62^{s}	+01° 03′ 53.4″	12.7	1102	G2	b	1.696	1.136	3.577471	0.04339	0	88.78	2010
Irena	Hercules	16^{h} 15^{m} 50^{s}	+10° 01′ 57″	9.42	359	F8	Iztok	2.712	1.079	6.871815	0.07551	0.0321	88.69	2010
Malmok	Virgo	14^{h} 29^{m} 18^{s}	−03° 26′ 40″	12.11	750	G8	Bocaprins	0.28	1.27	4.055259	0.0486	0	87.83	2011
WASP-40/HAT-P-27	Virgo	14^{h} 51^{m} 04.25^{s}	+05° 56′ 50.4″	12.21	665	G8	b	0.66	1.055	3.0395721	0.0403	0.078	84.98	2011
WASP-41	Centaurus	12^{h} 42^{m} 28.51^{s}	−30° 38′ 23.5″	11.6	587	G8V	b	0.92	1.21	3.052394	0.04	0	87.3	2010
WASP-41	Centaurus	12^{h} 42^{m} 28.51^{s}	−30° 38′ 23.5″	11.6	587	G8V	c	—	—	421.0	1.07	0.294	—	2015
WASP-42	Centaurus	12^{h} 51^{m} 55.62^{s}	−42° 04′ 25.2″	12.57		K1	b	0.5	1.08	4.98169	0.0458	0.06	88.25	2011
Gnomon	Sextans	10^{h} 19^{m} 38^{s}	−09° 48′ 23″	12.4		K7V	Astrolábos	1.78	0.93	0.813475	0.0142	0	82.6	2011
WASP-44	Cetus	00^{h} 15^{m} 37^{s}	−11° 56′ 17″	12.9		G8V	b	0.889	1.14	2.4238039	0.03473	0	86.02	2011
WASP-45	Sculptor	00^{h} 20^{m} 57^{s}	−35° 59′ 54″	12		K2V	b	1.007	1.16	3.1260876	0.04054	0	84.47	2011
WASP-46	Indus	21^{h} 14^{m} 57^{s}	−55° 52′ 18″	12.9		G6V	b	2.101	1.31	1.43037	0.02448	0	82.63	2011
WASP-47	Aquarius	20^{h} 40^{m} 09.16^{s}	−00° 52′ 15.0″	11.9	652	G9V	b	1.14	1.15	4.15914	0.052	0	89.32	2011
WASP-47	Aquarius	20^{h} 40^{m} 09.16^{s}	−00° 52′ 15.0″	11.9	652	G9V	c	1.31	—	596.0	1.41	0.28	87.0	2015
WASP-47	Aquarius	20^{h} 40^{m} 09.16^{s}	−00° 52′ 15.0″	11.9	652	G9V	d	0.0428	0.331	9.0304	0.088	0.007	89.22	2015
WASP-47	Aquarius	20^{h} 40^{m} 09.16^{s}	−00° 52′ 15.0″	11.9	652	G9V	e	0.029	0.167	0.78961	0.0173	0.03	86.2	2015
WASP-48	Cygnus	19^{h} 24^{m} 39^{s}	+55° 28′ 23″	11.06		F/G	b	0.98	1.67	2.143634	0.03444	0	80.09	2011
WASP-49A	Canis Major	06^{h} 04^{m} 21.47^{s}	−16° 57′ 55.1″	11.36		G6	b	0.378	1.115	2.78174			84.89	2011
Chaophraya	Eridanus	02^{h} 54^{m} 45^{s}	−10° 53′ 53″	11.6	750	G9	Maeping	1.468	1.153	1.9550959	0.02945	0.009	84.74	2011
WASP-51/HAT-P-30	Draco	08^{h} 15^{m} 48^{s}	+05° 50′ 12″	10.36	629	F9	b	0.711	1.34	2.810595	0.0419	0.035	83.6	2011
Anadolu	Pegasus	23^{h} 13^{m} 59.0^{s}	+08° 45′ 41″	12	457	K2V	Göktürk	0.46	1.27	1.74978			85.35	2011
WASP-53	Cetus	2^{h} 7^{m} 38.22^{s}	−20° 39′ 43″	11.0	766	K3	b	0.094	1.2	3.31	0.04101	-	87.08	2011
WASP-54	Virgo	13^{h} 41^{m} 49.03^{s}	−00° 07′ 41″	10.42		F9V/IV	b	0.6	1.4	3.7				2011
WASP-55	Virgo	08^{h} 15^{m} 48^{s}	+05° 50′ 12″	11.8	1076		b	0.57	1.3	4.46563	0.0533		89.2	2011
WASP-56	Triangulum	02^{h} 13^{m} 27.90^{s}	+23° 30′ 20.2″	11.48		G6	b	0.6	1.2	4.6				2011
WASP-57	Libra	14^{h} 55^{m} 16.84^{s}	−02° 03′ 27.5″	13.34	1483	G6	b	0.8	1.1	2.8				2011
WASP-58	Lyra	18^{h} 18^{m} 48.0^{s}	+45° 10′ 19″	11.66	978	G2V	b	0.89	1.37	5.01718	0.0561		87.4	2011
WASP-59	Pegasus	23^{h} 18^{m} 30.0^{s}	+24° 53′ 21″	13	408	K5V	b	0.863	0.775	7.91959	0.0697	0.1		2011
Morava	Pegasus	23^{h} 15^{m} 58^{s}	+31° 27′ 46″	12.18	1305	G1V	Vlasina	0.5	0.86	4.305	0.0531	0	87.9	2011
WASP-61	Lepus	05^{h} 01^{m} 12.0^{s}	−26° 03′ 15″	12.5	1566	F7	b	2.06	1.24	3.8559	0.0514		89.35	2011
Naledi	Dorado	05^{h} 48^{m} 34.0^{s}	−63° 59′ 18″	10.3	1566	F7	Krotoa	0.57	1.39	4.41195	0.0567		88.3	2011
Kosjenka	Columba	06^{h} 17^{m} 21.0^{s}	−38° 19′ 24″	11.2	1076	G8	Regoč	0.38	1.43	4.37809	0.574		87.8	2011
Atakoraka	Canis Major	6^{h} 44^{m} 28^{s}	−32° 51′ 30″	12.29	1141	G7	Agouto	1.217	1.244	1.57329	0.0264	0.04	86.7	2011
WASP-65	Cancer	08^{h} 53^{m} 18^{s}	+08° 31′ 23″	11.9	1010	G6	b	1.55	1.112	2.3114243	0.0334	-		2011
WASP-66	Antlia	10^{h} 32^{m} 54.0^{s}	−34° 59′ 23″	11.6	1239	F4	b	2.32	1.39	4.08605	0.0546		85.9	2011
WASP-67	Sagittarius	19^{h} 42^{m} 59.0^{s}	−19° 56′ 58″	12.5	734	K0V	b	0.42	1.4	4.61442	0.0517		85.8	2011
WASP-68	Sagittarius	20^{h} 20^{m} 22.98^{s}	−19° 18′ 52.9″	10.7		G0	b	0.95	1.24	5.08				2011
Wouri	Aquarius	21^{h} 0^{m} 6^{s}	−5° 5′ 40″			K5	Makombé	0.26	1.06	3.8681382	0.04525	0	86.7	2011
WASP-70A	Aquarius	21^{h} 01^{m} 54^{s}	−13° 26′ 00″	10.8	799	G4	b	0.59	1.16	3.713	0.0485	< 0.067	-	2011
Mpingo	Cetus	01^{h} 57^{m} 03.0^{s}	00° 45′ 32″	10.57	652	F8	Tanzanite	2.258	1.5	2.90367			84.2	2012
Diya	Fornax	00^{h} 10^{m} 56.6^{s}	−30° 10′ 09″	9.6		F7	Cuptor	1.5461	1.27	2.21674	0.03708			2013
WASP-73	Indus	21^{h} 19^{m} 47.91^{s}	−58° 08′ 56″	10.5		F9	b	1.88	1.16	4.087	0.05514			2013
WASP-74	Aquila	20^{h} 18^{m} 10.0^{s}	−01° 04′ 33″	9.7	391	F9	b	0.826	1.404	2.1377445	0.03443	0.0	79.86	2014
WASP-75	Cetus	01^{h} 31^{m} 18.2^{s}	−10:40:32°	11.45	848	F9	b	1.07	1.27	2.48419	0.0375		82	2013
WASP-76	Pisces	01^{h} 46^{m} 32.0^{s}	02° 42′ 02″	9.5	390	F7	b	0.92	1.83	1.80989	0.033		88	2013
WASP-77A	Cetus	02^{h} 28^{m} 37.0^{s}	−07° 03′ 38″	11.29		G8V	b	1.76	1.21	1.36003			89.4	2012
WASP-78	Eridanus	04^{h} 15^{m} 02.0^{s}	−22° 06′ 59″	12.0	1794	F8	b	1.16	1.75	2.17518	0.0415		89	2012
Montuno	Eridanus	04^{h} 25^{m} 29.0^{s}	−30° 36′ 02″	10.1	783	F3	Pollera	0.89	1.7	2.17518	0.0362		83.2	2012
Petra	Aquila	20^{h} 12^{m} 40.0^{s}	−02° 08′ 44″	11.88	196	K7V	Wadirum	0.554	0.952	3.06785	0.0346	0.07	89.92	2013
WASP-82	Orion	04^{h} 50^{m} 39^{s}	+01° 53′ 38″	10.1	650	F5	b	1.24	1.67	2.70578	0.0447		87.9	2013
WASP-83	Corvus	12^{h} 40^{m} 37.0^{s}	−19° 17′ 03″	12.9	978	G8	b	0.3	1.04	4.071252	0.059	0.0	88.9	2014
WASP-84	Hydra	08^{h} 44^{m} 26^{s}	+01° 50′ 36″		390	K0	b	0.694	0.942	8.52349	0.0771		88.368	2013
WASP-85A	Virgo	11^{h} 43^{m} 38.1^{s}	+06° 33′ 49.4″	11.2	407±260	G5	b	1.09	1.44	2.66	0.1138	~0	89.72	2014
WASP-86	Hercules	17^{h} 50^{m} 33.7^{s}	+36° 34′ 13″	10.66		F7	b	0.95	1.79	5.0316144	0.0617	0.0	84.45	2016
WASP-87 A	Centaurus	12^{h} 21^{m} 17.92^{s}	−52° 50′ 27.6″	10.7	780	F5	b	2.18	1.385	1.6827950	0.02946		81.07	2014
WASP-88	Indus	20^{h} 38^{m} 02.7^{s}	−48° 27′ 43.2″	11.4		F6	b	0.56	1.7	4.954	0.06432			2013
WASP-89	Capricornus	20^{h} 55^{m} 36.0^{s}	−18° 58′ 16″	13.1		K3	b	5.9	1.04	3.3564227	0.0427	0.193	89.4	2014
WASP-90	Equuleus	21^{h} 02^{m} 08^{s}	+07° 03′ 24″	11.7	1100	F6	b	0.63	1.63	3.91624	0.0562		82.1	2013
WASP-91	Tucana	23^{h} 51^{m} 23.0^{s}	−70° 09′ 10″	12.0		K3	b	1.34	1.03	2.798581	0.037	0.0	86.8	2017
WASP-92	Hercules	16^{h} 26^{m} 46.1^{s}	+51° 02′ 28″	13.18	1729	F7	b	0.805	1.461	2.1746742	0.0348	0.0	83.75	2016
WASP-93	Cassiopeia	00^{h} 37^{m} 50.0^{s}	+51° 17′ 20″	10.97	815	F4	b	1.47	1.597	2.7325321	0.04211	—	81.18	2016
WASP-94A	Microscopium	20^{h} 55^{m} 07.94^{s}	−34° 08′ 07.9″	10.1	587	F8	b	0.445	1.72	3.95	0.055	<0.13	88.7	2014
WASP-94B	Microscopium	20^{h} 55^{m} 09.16^{s}	−34° 08′ 07.9″	10.5	587	F9	b	≥0.617		2.008	0.0335			2014
WASP-95	Grus	21^{h} 02^{m} 08^{s}	−48° 00′ 11″	10.1		G2	b	1.13	1.21	2.18467	0.03416		88.4	2013
WASP-96	Phoenix	00^{h} 04^{m} 11^{s}	−47° 21′ 38″	12.2		G8	b	0.48	1.2	3.42526	0.0453		85.6	2013
WASP-97	Eridanus	01^{h} 38^{m} 25^{s}	−55° 46′ 19″	10.6		G5	b	1.32	1.13	2.07276	0.03303		88	2013
WASP-98	Eridanus	03^{h} 53^{m} 42^{s}	−34° 19′ 42″	13.0		G7	b	0.83	1.1	2.96264	0.036		86.3	2013
WASP-99	Eridanus	02^{h} 39^{m} 35^{s}	−50° 00′ 29″	9.5		F8	b	2.78	1.1	5.75251	0.0717		88.8	2013
WASP-100	Reticulum	04^{h} 35^{m} 50^{s}	−64° 01′ 37″	10.8		F2	b	2.03	1.69	2.84938	0.0457		82.6	2013
WASP-101	Canis Major	06^{h} 33^{m} 24^{s}	−23° 29′ 10″	10.3		F6	b	0.5	1.41	3.58572	0.0506		85	2013
WASP-102	Pegasus	22^{h} 25^{m} 51.4^{s}	15° 51′ 24″	12.73		G0	b	0.624	1.259	2.709813	0.0401	—	89.73	2016
WASP-103	Hercules	16^{h} 37^{m} 15.5^{s}	+07° 11′ 00.07″	12.1		F8	b	1.49	1.53	0.925	0.01985		86.3	2014
WASP-104	Leo	10^{h} 42^{m} 24.61^{s}	+07° 26′ 6.3″	11.12	466	G8	b	1.272	1.137	1.7554137	0.02918		83.63	2014
WASP-105	Phoenix	01^{h} 36^{m} 40.0^{s}	−50° 39′ 32″	12.10		K2	b	1.8	0.96	7.87288	0.075	0.0	89.7	2017
WASP-106	Leo	11^{h} 05^{m} 43.13^{s}	−05° 04′ 45.9″	11.21	923	F9	b	1.925	1.085	9.289715	0.0917		89.49	2014
WASP-107	Virgo	12^{h} 33^{m} 32.85^{s}	−10° 8′ 46.14″	11.6	208.7	K6V	b	0.12	0.94	5.72149	0.055	-	-	2017
WASP-108	Centaurus	13^{h} 03^{m} 19^{s}	−49° 38′ 23″	11.2	717	F9	b	1.167	1.215	2.6755463	0.0397		88.49	2014
WASP-109	Libra	15^{h} 28^{m} 13.0^{s}	−16° 24′ 39″	11.4	1076	F4	b	0.91	1.443	3.3190233	0.0463		84.28	2014
WASP-110	Sagittarius	20^{h} 23^{m} 30^{s}	−44° 03′ 30″	12.3	1043	G9	b	0.515	1.238	3.7783977	0.0457		88.06	2014
WASP-111	Capricornus	21^{h} 55^{m} 04^{s}	−22° 36′ 45″	10.3	684	F5	b	1.83	1.442	2.310965	0.03914		81.61	2014
WASP-112	Piscis Austrinus	22^{h} 37^{m} 57^{s}	−35° 09′ 14″	13.3	1337	G6	b	0.88	1.191	3.0353992	0.0382		88.68	2014
WASP-113	Boötes	14^{h} 59^{m} 29.0^{s}	+46° 57′ 36″	11.80	1174	G1	b	0.475	1.409	4.54216874538	0.05885	0.0	86.46	2016
WASP-114	Pegasus	21^{h} 50^{m} 40.0^{s}	10° 27′ 47″	12.74	1500	G0	b	1.769	1.339	1.5487743	0.02851	0.012	83.96	2016
WASP-117		02^{h} 27^{m} 06.09^{s}	−50° 17′ 04.3″	10.15		F9V	b	0.2755	1.021	10.02165	0.09459	0.302	89.14	2014
WASP-118	Pisces	01^{h} 18^{m} 12.0^{s}	02° 42′ 10″	11.02	815	F6	b	0.514	1.44	4.0460435	0.05453	—	88.7	2016
WASP-119	Reticulum	03^{h} 43^{m} 46.0^{s}	−65° 11′ 38″	12.2	1086	G5	b	1.23	1.4	2.49979	0.0363	0.058	85.0	2016
WASP-120	Horologium	04^{h} 10^{m} 28.0^{s}	−45° 53′ 54″	11		F5	b	5.06	1.515	3.6112706	0.0522	0.059	82.29	2015
Dilmun	Puppis	7^{h} 10^{m} 24.0595^{s}	−39° 5′ 50.562″	11.0	850	F6V	Tylos	1.184	1.81	1.275	0.02544	0	87.6	2015
WASP-122	Puppis	07^{h} 13^{m} 12.0^{s}	−42° 24′ 35″	11.0		G4	b	1.401	1.792	1.7100567	0.03107	0.0	78.35	2015
WASP-123	Sagittarius	19^{h} 17^{m} 55.0^{s}	−32° 51′ 36″	11.1		G5	b	0.92	1.327	2.977641	0.0431	0.0	85.79	2015
WASP-124	Piscis Austrinus	22^{h} 10^{m} 51.0^{s}	−30° 44′ 58″	12.7	1412	F9	b	0.6	1.24	3.37265	0.0499	0.017	86.3	2016
WASP-126	Hydrus	04^{h} 13^{m} 30.0^{s}	−69° 13′ 37″	10.8	763	G2	b	0.2841	0.96	3.2888	0.0449	0.18	87.9	2016
WASP-127	Sextans	10^{h} 42^{m} 14.08^{s}	−03° 50′ 6.26″	10.2	522	G5	b	0.18	1.37	4.17806	0.052	0	-	2016
WASP-129	Centaurus	11^{h} 45^{m} 12.0^{s}	−42° 03′ 50″	12.3	802	G1	b	1.0	0.93	5.748145	0.0628	0.096	87.7	2016
WASP-130	Centaurus	13^{h} 32^{m} 5.0^{s}	−42° 28′ 31″	11.1	587	G6	b	1.23	0.89	11.55098	0.1012	0.0	88.66	2016
WASP-131	Centaurus	14^{h} 00^{m} 46.0^{s}	−30° 35′ 01″	10.1	815	G0	b	0.27	1.22	5.322023	0.0607	0.0	85.0	2016
WASP-132	Lupus	14^{h} 30^{m} 26.0^{s}	−46° 09′ 33″	12.4	391	K4	b	0.41	0.87	7.133521	0.067	0.0	89.6	2016
WASP-133	Microscopium	20^{h} 58^{m} 18.0^{s}	−35° 47′ 48″	12.9	1491	G4	b	1.16	1.21	2.176423	0.0345	0.17	87.0	2016
WASP-134	Pegasus	21^{h} 50^{m} 17.0^{s}	04° 11′ 40″	11.3	636	G4	b	1.412	0.988	10.1467583	0.0956	0.1447	89.13	2018
WASP-134	Pegasus	21^{h} 50^{m} 17.0^{s}	04° 11′ 40″	11.3	636	G4	c	—	—	70.01	—	0.173	—	2018
WASP-135	Hercules	17^{h} 49^{m} 08.0^{s}	+29° 52′ 45″	13.3	978	G5	b	1.9	1.3	1.4013794	0.0243	0.0	82.0	2015
WASP-136	Cetus	0^{h} 1^{m} 18.17^{s}	−8° 55′ 34.6″	10.39	906	F5	b	1.51	1.38	5.22	0.0661	0	84.7	2016
WASP-137	Cetus	01^{h} 43^{m} 29.0^{s}	−14° 08′ 57″	11	801	G0	b	0.681	1.27	3.9080284	0.0519	0.14	84.59	2018
WASP-138	Cetus	2^{h} 46^{m} 33.37^{s}	−0° 27′ 50″	12.28		F9	b	1.22	1.09	3.6	0.0494	0	88.5	2016
WASP-139	Eridanus	03^{h} 18^{m} 15.0^{s}	−41° 18′ 08″	12.4	750	K0	b	0.117	0.8	5.924262	0.062	0.0	88.9	2016
WASP-140	Eridanus	01^{h} 38^{m} 25.0^{s}	−55° 46′ 19″	11.1	587	K0	b	2.44	1.44	2.2359835	0.0323	0.047	83.3	2016
WASP-141	Eridanus	04^{h} 47^{m} 18.0^{s}	−17° 06′ 55″	12.4	1859	F9	b	2.69	1.21	3.310651	0.0469	0.0	87.6	2016
WASP-142	Hydra	09^{h} 23^{m} 23.0^{s}	−23° 56′ 46″	12.3	2740	F8	b	0.84	1.53	2.052868	0.0347	0.0	80.2	2016
WASP-143	Hydra	09^{h} 22^{m} 02.0^{s}	+02° 55′ 57″	12.6	1115	G1	b	0.725	1.234	3.778873	0.049	0.0007	89.0	-
WASP-144	Microscopium	21^{h} 23^{m} 03.0^{s}	−40° 02′ 54″	12.9		K2V	b	0.44	0.85	2.2783152	0.0316	0.0	86.9	2018
WASP-145A	Indus	21^{h} 29^{m} 01.0^{s}	−58° 50′ 10″	11.5		K2V	b	0.89	0.9	—	0.0261	0.0	83.3	2018
WASP-146	Cetus	23^{h} 56^{m} 22.0^{s}	−13° 16′ 18″	12.90	1373	G0	b	1.11	1.228	3.396944	0.0451	0.15	83.96	2018
WASP-147	Aquarius	23^{h} 56^{m} 46.0^{s}	−22° 09′ 11″	12.31	1389	G4	b	0.275	1.115	4.60273	0.0549	0.0	87.9	2018
WASP-148	Hercules	16^{h} 56^{m} 31.0^{s}	+44° 18′ 09″	12.00	809		b	0.29	0.72	8.80381	0.0845	0.22	89.8	2020
WASP-148	Hercules	16^{h} 56^{m} 31.0^{s}	+44° 18′ 09″	12.00	809		c	—	—	34.516	0.21	0.359	—	2020
WASP-150	Draco	17^{h} 37^{m} 03.0^{s}	+53° 01′ 16″	12.00	1748		b	8.46	1.07	5.644207	0.0694	0.3775	84.01	2020
WASP-151	Pisces	23^{h} 16^{m} 15.2^{s}	00° 18′ 24″	12.9	1566	G1	b	0.31	1.13	4.533471	0.055	0.0	89.2	2017
WASP-152	Taurus	04^{h} 10^{m} 41.0^{s}	24° 24′ 07″	12.56	603	G7V	b	0.73	1.19	3.2588321	0.04217	0.066	86.656	2016
WASP-153	Lyra	18^{h} 37^{m} 03.0^{s}	+40° 01′ 07″	12.8	1402		b	0.39	1.55	3.332609	0.048	0.0	84.1	2017
WASP-156	Cetus	02^{h} 11^{m} 07.6^{s}	+02° 25′ 05″	11.6	457	K3	b	0.128	0.51	3.836169	0.0453	0.0	89.1	2017
WASP-157	Virgo	13^{h} 26^{m} 37.25^{s}	−8° 19′ 3.22″	12.91	1545	G2V	b	0.576	1.045	3.9516205	0.0529	0	-	2016
WASP-158	Cetus	00^{h} 16^{m} 35.0^{s}	−10° 58′ 35″	12.1		F6V	b	2.79	1.07	—	0.0517	0.0	87.7	2018
WASP-159	Caelum	04^{h} 32^{m} 33.0^{s}	−38° 58′ 06″	12.8	-	F9	b	0.55	1.38	3.840401	0.0538	0.0	88.1	2018
WASP-160B	Columba	05^{h} 50^{m} 43.1^{s}	−27° 37′ 23″	13.09	-	K0V	b	0.281	1.093	3.768495	0.0455	0.0	89.02	2018
Tislit	Hydra	08^{h} 25^{m} 21.1^{s}	−11° 30′ 04″	11.09		F6	Isli	2.49	1.143	5.4060425	0.0673	—	89.01	2018
WASP-162	Crater	11^{h} 13^{m} 10.0^{s}	−17° 39′ 28″	12.2		K0	b	5.2	1.0	9.62468	0.0871	0.434	89.3	2018
WASP-163	Ophiuchus	17^{h} 06^{m} 09.0^{s}	−10° 24′ 47″	12.54		G8	b	1.87	1.202	1.6096884	0.0266	—	85.42	2018
WASP-164	Tucana	22^{h} 59^{m} 29.6^{s}	−60° 26′ 52″	12.62		G2V	b	2.13	1.128	1.7771255	0.02818	0.0	82.73	2018
WASP-165	Aquarius	23^{h} 50^{m} 19.3^{s}	−17° 04′ 39″	12.69	-	G6	b	0.658	1.26	3.465509	0.04823	0.0	84.9	2018
Filetdor	Hydra	09^{h} 39^{m} 30.0^{s}	−20° 58′ 57″	9.36	369	F9	Catalineta	0.102	0.63	5.443526	0.0642	0.0	87.8	2018
WASP-167	Centaurus	13^{h} 4^{m} 10.53^{s}	−35° 32′ 58.28″	10.5	1430	F1V	b	8.0	-	2.0219591	0.0365	-	-	2017
WASP-168	Puppis	06^{h} 26^{m} 59.0^{s}	−46° 49′ 17″	11.0		F9V	b	0.42	1.5	4.153658	0.0519	0.0	84.4	2018
WASP-169	Hydra	08^{h} 29^{m} 33.0^{s}	−12° 56′ 41″	12.2	2081		b	0.561	1.304	5.6114118	0.0681	0.0	87.9	2019
WASP-170	Pyxis	09^{h} 01^{m} 39.9^{s}	−20° 43′ 14″	12.79		G1	b	1.6	1.096	2.34478022	0.0337	—	84.87	2018
WASP-171	Centaurus	11^{h} 27^{m} 23.0^{s}	−44° 05′ 19″	13	2524		b	1.084	0.988	3.8186244	0.0504	0.0	88.3	2019
WASP-172	Centaurus	13^{h} 17^{m} 44.0^{s}	−47° 14′ 15″	11.0	-	F1V	b	0.47	1.57	5.477433	0.0694	0.0	86.7	2018
WASP-173A	Sculptor	23^{h} 36^{m} 40.0^{s}	−34° 36′ 41″	11.3		G3	b	3.69	1.2	1.38665318	0.0248	0.0	85.2	2018
WASP-175	Hydra	11^{h} 05^{m} 17.0^{s}	−34° 07′ 20″	12	1905		b	0.99	1.208	3.0652907	0.044	0.0	85.33	2019
WASP-176	Delphinus	20^{h} 54^{m} 45.0^{s}	+09° 10′ 45″	12.00	1885		b	0.855	1.505	3.899052	0.0535	0.0	86.7	2020
WASP-177	Aquarius	22^{h} 19^{m} 11.0^{s}	−01° 50′ 04″	11.6	581	K2	b	0.508	1.58	3.071722	0.03957	—	84.14	2019
WASP-178	Lupus	15^{h} 09^{m} 05.0^{s}	−42° 42′ 18″	9.95	1363	A1IV-V	b	1.66	1.81	3.3448285	0.0558	0.0	85.7	2019
WASP-181	Pisces	01^{h} 47^{m} 10.0^{s}	03° 07′ 59″	10.0	1445	G2	b	0.299	1.184	4.5195064	0.05427	—	88.38	2019
WASP-182	Microscopium	20^{h} 46^{m} 42.0^{s}	−41° 49′ 15″	12	1080		b	0.148	0.85	3.3769848	0.0451	0.0	83.88	2019
WASP-183	Leo	10^{h} 55^{m} 09.0^{s}	−00° 44′ 14″	12.76	1070	G9/K0	b	0.502	1.47	4.1117771	0.04632	—	85.37	2019
WASP-184	Centaurus	13^{h} 58^{m} 04.0^{s}	−30° 20′ 53″	12.9	2087	F1V	b	0.57	1.33	5.1817	0.0627	0.0	86.9	2019
WASP-185	Virgo	14^{h} 16^{m} 14.3^{s}	−19° 32′ 32″	11.101	911	G0V	b	0.980	1.25	9.38755	0.0904	0.24	86.8	2019
WASP-189	Libra	15^{h} 02^{m} 44.9^{s}	−03° 01′ 53″	6.60	323	A6IV-V	b	2.13	1.374	2.724033	0.0497	0.0	84.321	2018
WASP-192	Centaurus	14^{h} 54^{m} 38.1^{s}	−38° 44′ 40″	12.678	1660	G0V	b	2.30	1.23	2.8786765	0.0408	0.0	82.7	2019
WASP-193	Hydra	10^{h} 57^{m} 23.9^{s}	−29° 59′ 49″	12.134	1232	F9V	b	0.139	1.464	6.2463345	0.0676	0.0560	88.49	2023

=== Brown dwarfs ===
Star	Constellation	Right ascension	Declination	App. mag.	Distance (ly)	Spectral type	Object	Mass (M_{J})	Radius (R_{J})	Orbital period (d)	Semimajor axis (AU)	Orbital eccentricity	Inclination (°)	Discovery year
WASP-30	Aquarius	23^{h} 53^{m} 38.1^{s}	−10° 07′ 05.1″	11.91	1161	F8	b	60.96	0.889	4.156736	0.05325	0	89.57	2010
WASP-53A	Cetus	02^{h} 07^{m} 38.22^{s}	−20° 39′ 43.0″	12.19	654	K3	c	>16.35	—	>2840	>3.73	0.8369	—	2016
WASP-81A	Aquila	20^{h} 16^{m} 49.89^{s}	+03° 17′ 38.7″	12.29	1313	G1	c	56.6	—	1297.2	2.426	0.5570	—	2016
WASP-128	Centaurus	11^{h} 31^{m} 26.1^{s}	−41° 41′ 22″	12.5	1376	G0V	b	37.19	0.937	2.20883665	0.0359	0.0	89.1	2018

=== Excluded objects ===
- WASP-3Ac, a 3.75-day period 0.05 M_{J} planetary candidate, was proposed in 2010 to explain transit timing variations observed in WASP-3b, but its existence was refuted in 2012.
- WASP-9b was determined to be a false positive after its initial public announcement as a planet, and the identifier was not subsequently reassigned to a real planetary system.

== See also ==
- Lists of exoplanets
- Roque de los Muchachos Observatory
- South African Astronomical Observatory
- Science and Technology Facilities Council
- V1400 Centauri (SWASP J1407b)

=== Other extrasolar planet search projects ===
- Trans-Atlantic Exoplanet Survey or TrES
- XO Telescope or XO
- Kilodegree Extremely Little Telescope or KELT
- Next-Generation Transit Survey or NGTS
- HATNet Project or HAT

=== Extrasolar planet searching spacecraft ===
- CoRoT – European space telescope that operated between 2006 - 2014
- Kepler space telescope – NASA space telescope for exoplanetology (2009–2018)
- Transiting Exoplanet Survey Satellite – NASA satellite of the Explorer program
