= WASP-85 Ab =

Hot Jupiter

Discovery
- Discovered by: SuperWASP
- Discovery date: 2014
- Detection method: Transit

Orbital characteristics
- Semi-major axis: 0.038 AU (5,700,000 km)
- Eccentricity: 0.103
- Orbital period (sidereal): 2.656 d
- Inclination: 349.0
- Star: WASP-85 A

Physical characteristics
- Mean radius: 1.2 R_{J}

WASP-85 Ab is an exoplanet that orbits WASP-85 A, a star that is part of a binary system. WASP-85 Ab's mass and radius indicate that it has a bulk composition like that of Jupiter. Unlike Jupiter, and similar to other gas giants, it orbits very close to its star, and is classified as a hot Jupiter.

== See also ==
- Extrasolar planet
- Hot Jupiter
- Kepler-447b
