= WASP-37 =

Star in constellation of Virgo

Observation data Epoch J2000 Equinox ICRS
- Constellation: Virgo
- Right ascension: 14^{h} 47^{m} 46.5620^{s}
- Declination: 01° 03′ 53.800″
- Apparent magnitude (V): 12.704

Characteristics
- Evolutionary stage: main sequence
- Spectral type: G2V

Astrometry
Radial velocity (R_{v})	7.927±0.0042 km/s
Proper motion (μ)	RA: −28.214(16) mas/yr Dec.: +18.201(42) mas/yr
Parallax (π)	2.6257±0.0173 mas
Distance	1,242 ± 8 ly (381 ± 3 pc)

Details
Mass	0.926^{+0.039}_{−0.034} M_{☉}
Radius	1.071^{+0.019}_{−0.018} R_{☉}
Surface gravity (log g)	4.346^{+0.023}_{−0.021} cgs
Temperature	5,795^{+69}_{−64} K
Metallicity [Fe/H]	−0.098^{+0.05}_{−0.06} dex
Rotational velocity (v sin i)	2.4±1.6 km/s
Age	10.31^{+4.01}_{−2.55} Gyr

Other designations
- TOI-5674, TIC 368805700, WASP-37, 2MASS J14474655+0103538, DENIS J144746.5+010354

Database references
SIMBAD	data
Exoplanet Archive	data

WASP-37 is a G-type main-sequence star about 1,240 light-years away in the constellation of Virgo.

== Star characteristics ==
WASP-37 has a low metallicity of just 40% of solar, and is likely older than the Sun. WASP-37 does not have noticeable flare activity.

== Planetary system ==
The hot Jupiter class planet WASP-37b was discovered around WASP-37 in 2010. A study in 2018 found that the stability of orbits in the habitable zone of WASP-37 is not significantly affected by WASP-37b.

The WASP-37 planetary system
Companion (in order from star)	Mass	Semimajor axis (AU)	Orbital period (days)	Eccentricity	Inclination (°)	Radius
b	1.72±0.17 M_{J}	0.0447+0.0018 −0.0020	3.5774807(19)	<0.052	88.82+0.77 −0.86	1.16+0.07 −0.06 R_{J}
