= WASP-32 =

Star in the constellation Pisces

WASP-32 / Parumleo
Observation data Epoch J2000 Equinox ICRS
- Constellation: Pisces
- Right ascension: 00^{h} 15^{m} 50.80773^{s}
- Declination: +01° 12′ 01.5889″
- Apparent magnitude (V): 11.26

Characteristics
- Evolutionary stage: main sequence
- Spectral type: mid-F
- B−V color index: -0.2
- J−H color index: 0.005
- J−K color index: 0.342

Astrometry
Radial velocity (R_{v})	18.27±0.32 km/s
Proper motion (μ)	RA: 1.951 mas/yr Dec.: 16.447 mas/yr
Parallax (π)	3.5706±0.0373 mas
Distance	913 ± 10 ly (280 ± 3 pc)

Details
Mass	1.10±0.03 M_{☉}
Radius	1.09±0.03 R_{☉}
Luminosity	1.6 L_{☉}
Surface gravity (log g)	4.39±0.03 cgs
Temperature	6140+90 −100 K
Metallicity [Fe/H]	−0.13±0.10 dex
Rotation	11.6±1.0 d
Rotational velocity (v sin i)	3.9+0.4 −0.5 km/s
Age	2.22+0.62 −0.73 Gyr

Other designations
- Parumleo, TOI-4523, TIC 427332229, WASP-32, TYC 2-1155-1, 2MASS J00155080+0112016

Database references
SIMBAD	data
Exoplanet Archive	data

WASP-32, also named Parumleo, is an F-type main-sequence star about 913 light-years away in the constellation of Pisces.

== Nomenclature ==
The designation WASP-32 comes from the Wide Angle Search for Planets.

This was one of the systems selected to be named in the 2019 NameExoWorlds campaign during the 100th anniversary of the IAU, which assigned each country a star and planet to be named. This system was assigned to Singapore. The star was given the formal name Parumleo in January 2020, Latin for small lion and referencing the national animal of Singapore, and the planet was named Viculus, Latin for little village.

== Stellar characteristics ==
The WASP-32 star is relatively depleted of lithium, which is common for massive stars hosting hot Jupiter planets.

== Planetary system ==
The hot Jupiter class planet WASP-32b, later named Viculus, was discovered around WASP-32 in 2010. It was found to orbit the parent star in a prograde direction in 2014.

A follow-up study utilizing transit-timing variation analysis failed to find any such variation, so there is no evidence of other massive planets around WASP-32 as of 2015.

The WASP-32 planetary system
Companion (in order from star)	Mass	Semimajor axis (AU)	Orbital period (days)	Eccentricity	Inclination (°)	Radius
b (Viculus)	3.49+0.12 −0.11 M_{J}	0.03904+0.00062 −0.00061	2.7186591(24)	<0.004	85.1±0.2	1.10±0.04 R_{J}
