= WASP-58 =

High proper motion star in the constellation Lyra

Observation data Epoch J2000 Equinox ICRS
- Constellation: Lyra
- Right ascension: 18^{h} 18^{m} 48.25296^{s}
- Declination: +45° 10′ 19.2603″
- Apparent magnitude (V): 11.66

Characteristics
- Evolutionary stage: Main sequence
- Spectral type: G2V

Astrometry
Radial velocity (R_{v})	−28.42±0.71 km/s
Proper motion (μ)	RA: 32.658 mas/yr Dec.: 47.057 mas/yr
Parallax (π)	3.3963±0.0112 mas
Distance	960 ± 3 ly (294.4 ± 1.0 pc)

Orbit
Primary	WASP-58A
Name	WASP-58B
Semi-major axis (a)	1.281±0.002" (384±64 AU)

Details

WASP-58A
Mass	0.940±0.100 M_{☉}
Radius	1.17±0.13 R_{☉}
Surface gravity (log g)	4.23±0.1 cgs
Temperature	6039±55 K
Metallicity [Fe/H]	-0.09±0.04 dex
Rotation	22.6^{+11.7}_{−6.1} d
Rotational velocity (v sin i)	2.8±0.9 km/s
Age	12.80^{+0.20}_{−2.10} Gyr

WASP-58B
Temperature	3396±53 K

Other designations
- TOI-1627, TIC 424435940, WASP-58, TYC 3525-76-1, 2MASS J18184825+4510192

Database references
SIMBAD	data
Exoplanet Archive	data

WASP-58 is a binary star system in the constellation Lyra. It comprises a G-type main-sequence star and a red dwarf at a separation of 384 astronomical units. WASP-58 is slightly depleted in heavy elements, having 80% of the solar abundance of iron. The system is much older than the Sun at 12.80^{+0.20}_{−2.10} billion years. Based on parallax measurements, it lies at a distance of 960 light-years (290 parsecs).

Lithium was detected in the stellar spectrum of WASP-58A, making the star anomalous for its advanced age.

A multiplicity survey in 2015 detected a red dwarf stellar companion at a projected separation of 1.281±0.002″ to WASP-58A, and it was confirmed to be gravitationally bound in 2016.

== Planetary system ==
In 2012 a transiting hot Jupiter planet, WASP-58b, was detected on a tight, circular orbit around the primary star WASP-58A. The planetary equilibrium temperature is 1270±80 K.

The WASP-58 planetary system
Companion (in order from star)	Mass	Semimajor axis (AU)	Orbital period (days)	Eccentricity	Inclination (°)	Radius
b	0.899^{+0.074}_{−0.072} M_{J}	0.0562^{+0.0019}_{−0.0020}	5.017180±0.000011	<0.044	87.4±1.5	1.37±0.2 R_{J}
