= WASP-159 =

Star in the constellation Caelum

Observation data Epoch J2000.0 Equinox J2000.0
- Constellation: Caelum
- Right ascension: 04^{h} 32^{m} 32.75581^{s}
- Declination: −38° 58′ 05.9529″
- Apparent magnitude (V): 12.84±0.24

Characteristics
- Evolutionary stage: subgiant
- Spectral type: F9
- B−V color index: −0.21

Astrometry
Radial velocity (R_{v})	35.16±0.01 km/s
Proper motion (μ)	RA: −0.586 mas/yr Dec.: +5.347 mas/yr
Parallax (π)	1.3723±0.0098 mas
Distance	2,380 ± 20 ly (729 ± 5 pc)

Details
Mass	1.41±0.12 M_{☉}
Radius	2.11±0.10 R_{☉}
Luminosity	4.674^{+0.064}_{−0.053} L_{☉}
Surface gravity (log g)	3.94±0.04 cgs
Temperature	6,120±140 K
Metallicity [Fe/H]	+0.22±0.12 dex
Rotational velocity (v sin i)	5.7±0.4 km/s
Age	3.40±0.95 Gyr

Other designations
- TOI-1903, TIC 77156657, WASP-159, TYC 7579-251-1

Database references
SIMBAD	data
Exoplanet Archive	data

WASP-159 is a star located in the southern constellation Caelum, the chisel. It has an apparent magnitude of 12.84, making it readily visible in telescopes with an aperture of at least four inches, but not to the naked eye. The star is located relatively far at a distance of 2,380 light-years based on recent parallax measurements from the Gaia spacecraft, but it is receding with a heliocentric radial velocity of 35.2 km/s.

WASP-159 has a stellar classification of F9 indicating that it is a late F-type star. It appears to be ceasing hydrogen fusion at its core and evolving towards the red giant branch. It has 1.41 times the Sun's mass and 2.11 times the radius of the Sun. It radiates 4.674 times the luminosity of the Sun from its photosphere at an effective temperature of 6,120 K, giving it a whitish-yellow hue when viewed in a telescope. WASP-159 is metal enriched with an iron abundance 166% that of the Sun, and it is estimated to be 3.4 billion years old.

== Planetary system ==
In 2019, SuperWASP discovered a transiting exoplanet orbiting the star after spectral and radial velocity observations. WASP-159b is a "bloated" hot Jupiter that takes roughly 3.8 days to revolve around its host star in a circular orbit.

The WASP-159 planetary system
Companion (in order from star)	Mass	Semimajor axis (AU)	Orbital period (days)	Eccentricity	Inclination	Radius
b	0.55±0.08 M_{J}	0.0538±0.0015	3.8404008+0.0000063 −0.0000064	0.00 (fixed)	88.1±1.4°	1.38±0.09 R_{J}
