= WASP-54 =

Star in constellation of Virgo

Observation data Epoch J2000 Equinox ICRS
- Constellation: Virgo
- Right ascension: 13^{h} 41^{m} 49.0301^{s}
- Declination: −00° 07′ 41.033″
- Apparent magnitude (V): 10.41

Characteristics
- Evolutionary stage: subgiant
- Spectral type: F8V

Astrometry
Radial velocity (R_{v})	−2.71±0.22 km/s
Proper motion (μ)	RA: −10.810 mas/yr Dec.: −24.744 mas/yr
Parallax (π)	3.9859±0.0200 mas
Distance	818 ± 4 ly (251 ± 1 pc)

Orbit
Primary	WASP-54A
Name	WASP-54B
Semi-major axis (a)	5.728±0.006" (1,450 AU)

Details

WASP-54A
Mass	1.213±0.032 M_{☉}
Radius	1.828^{+0.091}_{−0.081} R_{☉}
Surface gravity (log g)	4.00±0.02 cgs
Temperature	6,100±100 K
Metallicity [Fe/H]	−0.27±0.08 dex
Rotational velocity (v sin i)	4.0±0.8 km/s
Age	6.9^{+1.0}_{−1.9} Gyr

WASP-54B
Mass	0.19±0.01 M_{☉}
Temperature	3,216^{+26}_{−25} K

Other designations
- BD+00 3088, TOI-1833, TIC 61098812, WASP-54, TYC 4967-678-1, GSC 04967-00678, 2MASS J13414903-0007410

Database references
SIMBAD	A
- B
Exoplanet Archive	data

WASP-54, also known as BD+00 3088, is a binary star system about 818 light-years away in the constellation Virgo. The primary, WASP-54A, is an F-type subgiant, accompanied by the red dwarf WASP-54B on a wide orbit. WASP-54 is depleted in heavy elements, having 55% of the solar abundance of iron. WASP-54 is slightly older than the Sun at 6.9^{+1.0}_{−1.9} billion years.

== Star system ==
A multiplicity survey in 2017 detected a red dwarf stellar companion WASP-54B 5.7″ away from WASP-54A. The companion was proven to be co-moving in 2020.

== Planetary system ==
In 2012 a transiting hot Jupiter planet, WASP-54b, was detected on a tight orbit around WASP-54A. The planetary equilibrium temperature is 1,742+49
−69 K.

The WASP-54 planetary system
Companion (in order from star)	Mass	Semimajor axis (AU)	Orbital period (days)	Eccentricity	Inclination (°)	Radius
b	0.606±0.018 M_{J}	0.04988^{+0.00043}_{−0.00045}	3.6936411(59)	<0.06	84.97±0.61	1.653^{+0.090}_{−0.083} R_{J}
