= WASP-74 =

Star in the constellation Aquila

Observation data Epoch J2000 Equinox ICRS
- Constellation: Aquila
- Right ascension: 20^{h} 18^{m} 09.32^{s}
- Declination: −01° 04′ 33.6″
- Apparent magnitude (V): 9.75

Characteristics
- Evolutionary stage: subgiant
- Spectral type: F9
- B−V color index: 0.64

Astrometry
Radial velocity (R_{v})	−15.92±0.19 km/s
Proper motion (μ)	RA: +1.331 mas/yr Dec.: −64.680 mas/yr
Parallax (π)	6.6900±0.0149 mas
Distance	488 ± 1 ly (149.5 ± 0.3 pc)

Details
Mass	1.236±0.026 M_{☉}
Radius	1.444±0.044 R_{☉}
Luminosity	2.65 L_{☉}
Surface gravity (log g)	4.32 cgs
Temperature	5,883±57 K
Metallicity [Fe/H]	0.38±0.03 dex
Rotational velocity (v sin i)	5.85±0.50 km/s
Age	3.49±0.65 Gyr

Other designations
- BD−01°3943, TOI-7061, TIC 244089109, WASP-74, TYC 5162-1142-1, 2MASS J20180931-0104324

Database references
SIMBAD	data
Exoplanet Archive	data

WASP-74 is a star in the constellation of Aquila, located approximately 488 light-years (149 parsecs) from the Sun. At least one exoplanet is known to orbit the star.

== Stellar characteristics ==
WASP-74 is a yellow-white subgiant of spectral type F9. Its apparent magnitude is 9.75, making it invisible to the naked eye. Based on spectroscopic analysis with the HARPS-N spectrograph and Bayesian modelling using PARSEC isochrones, the star has a mass of 1.236 ± 0.026 solar masses, a radius of 1.444±0.044 solar radii, and an effective temperature of 5,883±57 K. Its metallicity ([Fe/H]) is +0.38±0.03, indicating it is notably more metal-rich than the Sun. Stellar models give an age of 3.49±0.65 billion years, and the star's projected rotational velocity is 5.85±0.50 km/s.

The star's proper motion is 1.350±0.082 mas/yr in right ascension and −64.604±0.060 mas/yr in declination, with a radial velocity of −15.32±0.27 km/s.

== Planetary system ==
In 2015, one exoplanet was announced orbiting WASP-74, designated WASP-74 b, discovered by the SuperWASP survey using the transit method. It is a hot Jupiter with a mass of 0.72 Jupiter masses and a radius of 1.312 Jupiter radii, completing one orbit every 2.13775138 days at a distance of 0.0334 AU from its host star, with an equilibrium temperature of approximately 1,865 K. The planet's orbit is circular and well-aligned with the stellar equator, with a measured sky-projected spin-orbit angle of 0.77±0.99 degrees.

The WASP-74 planetary system
Companion (in order from star)	Mass	Semimajor axis (AU)	Orbital period (days)	Eccentricity	Inclination (°)	Radius
b	0.72 M_{J}	0.0334	2.13775138	0	—	1.312 R_{J}
