= WASP-26 =

Yellow main sequence star in the constellation Cetus

Observation data Epoch J2000 Equinox ICRS
- Constellation: Cetus
- Right ascension: 00^{h} 18^{m} 24.7008^{s}
- Declination: −15° 16′ 02.276″
- Apparent magnitude (V): 11.30

Characteristics
- Evolutionary stage: subgiant
- Spectral type: G0
- B−V color index: 0.32
- J−H color index: 0.246
- J−K color index: 0.411

Astrometry
Radial velocity (R_{v})	9.07±0.41 km/s
Proper motion (μ)	RA: +27.416 mas/yr Dec.: −24.524 mas/yr
Parallax (π)	3.9574±0.0247 mas
Distance	824 ± 5 ly (253 ± 2 pc)

Details
Mass	1.095±0.043 M_{☉}
Radius	1.284±0.035 R_{☉}
Luminosity	1.84 L_{☉}
Surface gravity (log g)	4.260±0.022 cgs
Temperature	6015±55 K
Metallicity [Fe/H]	−0.02±0.09 dex
Rotational velocity (v sin i)	3.9±0.4 km/s
Age	4.0+5.9 −4.0 Gyr

Other designations
- TOI-2386, TIC 32487566, WASP-26, TYC 5839-876-1, 2MASS J00182469-1516022, DENIS J001824.6-151601

Database references
SIMBAD	data
Exoplanet Archive	data

WASP-26 is a G-type subgiant star about 824 light-years away in the constellation of Cetus.

== Star characteristics ==
WASP-26 is an old star close to leaving the main sequence and is part of a wide binary. The binary's projected separation is 3800 astronomical units, its companion star being a K-type star with an effective temperature of 4600K and a visual magnitude of 13.6. WASP-26 produces a large amount of ultraviolet light due to frequent flares, with an average ultraviolet flux close to the F7 class main-sequence star WASP-1.

== Planetary system ==
The hot Jupiter class planet WASP-26b was discovered around WASP-26 in 2010. The planet would have an equilibrium temperature of 1660±40 K, but measured temperatures are slightly higher at 1775K and no noticeable difference exists between the day-side and the night-side of the planet. A 2011 study using the Rossiter-McLaughlin effect failed to determine the inclination of the planetary orbit to the equatorial plane of the parent star due to high stellar noise, but an initial constraint of -34^{+36}_{−26}° was published in 2012.

The WASP-26 planetary system
Companion (in order from star)	Mass	Semimajor axis (AU)	Orbital period (days)	Eccentricity	Inclination (°)	Radius
b	1.038+0.020 −0.021 M_{J}	0.03997+0.00035 −0.00036	2.7565972(19)	<0.0039	82.83±0.27	1.216±0.047 R_{J}
