= WASP-41 =

Star in the constellation Centaurus

Observation data Epoch J2000 Equinox ICRS
- Constellation: Centaurus
- Right ascension: 12^{h} 42^{m} 28.4950^{s}
- Declination: −30° 38′ 23.529″
- Apparent magnitude (V): 11.6

Characteristics
- Evolutionary stage: main sequence
- Spectral type: G8V

Astrometry
| Radial velocity (R_{v}) | 3.40±0.42 km/s |
| Proper motion (μ) | RA: 14.878 mas/yr Dec.: 11.988 mas/yr |
| Parallax (π) | 6.1193±0.0203 mas |
| Distance | 533 ± 2 ly (163.4 ± 0.5 pc) |

Details
| Mass | 0.987±0.047 M_{☉} |
| Radius | 0.886±0.017 R_{☉} |
| Luminosity | 0.64±0.04 L_{☉} |
| Surface gravity (log g) | 4.538±0.009 cgs |
| Temperature | 5,545±33 K |
| Metallicity [Fe/H] | 0.06±0.02 dex |
| Rotation | 18.41±0.05 d |
| Rotational velocity (v sin i) | 1.50±0.05 km/s |
| Age | 2.289±0.077 Gyr |

Other designations
- CD−29 9873, TOI-780, TIC 398943781, WASP-41, TYC 7247-587-1, GSC 07247-00587, 2MASS J12422849-3038235

Database references
| SIMBAD | data |
| Exoplanet Archive | data |

WASP-41 is a G-type main-sequence star about 533 light-years away in the constellation Centaurus. Its surface temperature is 5450±150 K. WASP-41 is similar to the Sun in its concentration of heavy elements, with a metallicity Fe/H index of −0.080±0.090, but is much younger at an age of 2.289±0.077 billion years. The star exhibits strong starspot activity, with spots covering 3% of the stellar surface.

Multiplicity surveys did not detect any stellar companions as of 2017.

== Planetary system ==
In 2011, one planet, named WASP-41b, was discovered on a tight, circular orbit. The transmission spectrum taken in 2017 was gray and featureless. No atmospheric constituents could be distinguished. The planetary orbit of WASP-41b is slightly misaligned with the equatorial plane of the star, at a misalignment angle of 9.15^{+2.85}_{−2.62}°. The planetary equilibrium temperature is 1242±12 K.

Another planet, WASP-41c, was discovered in 2015. The planets are too far apart to significantly affect each other's orbits. The planetary equilibrium temperature of WASP-41c is 247±5 K.

The WASP-41 planetary system
| Companion (in order from star) | Mass | Semimajor axis (AU) | Orbital period (days) | Eccentricity | Inclination (°) | Radius |
|---|---|---|---|---|---|---|
| b | 0.94±0.05 M_{J} | 0.04022(44) | 3.0524040(9) | <0.026 | 87.70±0.08 | 1.18±0.03 R_{J} |
| c | ≥3.18±0.20 M_{J} | 1.07±0.03 | 421±2 | 0.294±0.024 | >70 | — |
