= HD 146389 =

Star in the constellation Hercules

WASP-38 / Irena
Observation data Epoch J2000 Equinox ICRS
- Constellation: Hercules
- Right ascension: 16^{h} 15^{m} 50.36533^{s}
- Declination: +10° 01′ 57.2843″
- Apparent magnitude (V): 9.447±0.024

Characteristics
- Evolutionary stage: main sequence
- Spectral type: F8
- B−V color index: 0.476
- J−H color index: 0.181
- J−K color index: 0.289

Astrometry
Radial velocity (R_{v})	−9.24±0.23 km/s
Proper motion (μ)	RA: −31.135 mas/yr Dec.: −39.167 mas/yr
Parallax (π)	7.3373±0.0181 mas
Distance	445 ± 1 ly (136.3 ± 0.3 pc)

Details
Mass	1.203±0.036 M_{☉}
Radius	1.331+0.030 −0.025 R_{☉}
Luminosity	2.838±0.024 L_{☉}
Surface gravity (log g)	4.25+0.012 −0.013 cgs
Temperature	6,150±80 K
Metallicity [Fe/H]	0.06 dex
Rotational velocity (v sin i)	8.6±0.4 km/s
Age	350 Myr; 400±500 Myr

Other designations
- Irena, BD+10°2980, HD 146389, SAO 102042, WASP-38, 2MASS J16155036+1001572

Database references
SIMBAD	data
Exoplanet Archive	data

HD 146389, also known as WASP-38 and named Irena, is a star with a yellow-white hue in the northern constellation of Hercules. It is invisible to the naked eye with an apparent visual magnitude of 9.4 The star is located at a distance of approximately 445 light-years from the Sun based on parallax, but is drifting closer with a radial velocity of −9 km/s. The star is known to host one exoplanet, designated WASP-38b or formally named Iztok.

== Nomenclature ==
The designation HD 146389 comes from the Henry Draper Catalogue, while WASP-38 comes from the Wide Angle Search for Planets.

This was one of the systems selected to be named in the 2019 NameExoWorlds campaign during the 100th anniversary of the IAU, which assigned each country a star and planet to be named. This system was assigned to Slovenia. The approved names were Irena for the star and Iztok for the planet, named after characters from the Slovenian novel Pod svobodnim soncem.

== Characteristics ==
The stellar classification of HD 146389 is F8, which is an F-type star of uncertain luminosity class. The age of the star is uncertain. It shows a low lithium abundance, which suggests an age of more than 5 billion years. However, the rotation rate indicates an age closer to one billion. The study in 2015 utilizing Chandra X-ray Observatory, have failed to detect any X-ray emissions from the star during planetary eclipse, which may indicate an unusually low coronal activity or the presence of absorbing gas ring formed by atmosphere escaping planet WASP-38 b. The star is 33% larger and 20% more massive than the Sun. It is radiating nearly three times the luminosity of the Sun at an effective temperature of 6,150 K.

== Planetary system ==
The hot Jupiter class planet WASP-38 b, later named Iztok, was discovered around HD 146389 in 2010. The planet is losing significant amounts of gas, estimated to be 0.023 Earth masses per billion years. In 2013, it was found the planetary orbit is surprisingly well aligned with the rotational axis of the parent star, despite the noticeable orbital eccentricity.

A 2012 study, utilizing the Rossiter–McLaughlin effect, have determined the orbital plane of WASP-38b is poorly constrained but probably aligned with the equatorial plane of the star, misalignment equal to 15^{+33}_{−43}°.

The WASP-38 planetary system
Companion (in order from star)	Mass	Semimajor axis (AU)	Orbital period (days)	Eccentricity	Inclination (°)	Radius
b (Iztok)	2.691±0.036 M_{J}	0.07522^{+0.00074}_{−0.00075}	6.871815^{+0.000045}_{−0.000042}	0.0314^{+0.0046}_{−0.0041}	89.69^{+0.3}_{−0.25}	1.094^{+0.029}_{−0.028} R_{J}
