= WASP-62 =

Star in the constellation Dorado

WASP-62 / Naledi
Observation data Epoch J2000.0 Equinox ICRS
- Constellation: Dorado
- Right ascension: 05^{h} 48^{m} 33.59333^{s}
- Declination: −63° 59′ 18.3884″
- Apparent magnitude (V): 10.21

Characteristics
- Evolutionary stage: main-sequence star
- Spectral type: F7
- Apparent magnitude (B): 10.73
- Apparent magnitude (G): 10.077±0.003
- Apparent magnitude (R): 9.93

Astrometry
| Radial velocity (R_{v}) | 15.24±0.25 km/s |
| Proper motion (μ) | RA: -15.439 mas/yr Dec.: 26.151 mas/yr |
| Parallax (π) | 5.6910±0.0113 mas |
| Distance | 573 ± 1 ly (175.7 ± 0.3 pc) |

Details
| Mass | 1.250±0.050 M_{☉} |
| Radius | 1.280±0.050 R_{☉} |
| Surface gravity (log g) | 4.45±0.1 cgs |
| Temperature | 6,230±80 K |
| Metallicity [Fe/H] | 0.040±0.060 dex |
| Rotational velocity (v sin i) | 8.70±0.40 km/s |
| Age | 2.60+0.50 −0.70 Gyr |

Other designations
- Naledi, CPD−64 484, TOI-102, TIC 149603524, WASP-62, TYC 8900-874-1, GSC 08900-00874, 2MASS J05483359-6359183

Database references
| SIMBAD | data |
| Exoplanet Archive | data |

WASP-62, formally named Naledi, is a single star about 573 light-years (176 parsecs) away in the constellation Dorado. It is an F-class main-sequence star, orbited by a planet, WASP-62b. The age of WASP-62 is much younger than the Sun at 0.8±0.6 billion years, and it has a metal abundance similar to the Sun.

== Nomenclature ==
The designation WASP-62 indicates that this was the 62nd star found to have a planet by the Wide Angle Search for Planets.

This was one of the systems selected to be named in the 2019 NameExoWorlds campaign during the 100th anniversary of the IAU, which assigned each country a star and planet to be named. This system was assigned to South Africa. The approved names were announced in December 2019. The star is named Naledi, which means star in several languages of South Africa, and the planet is named Krotoa after a Khoi translator during colonial times.

== Planetary system ==
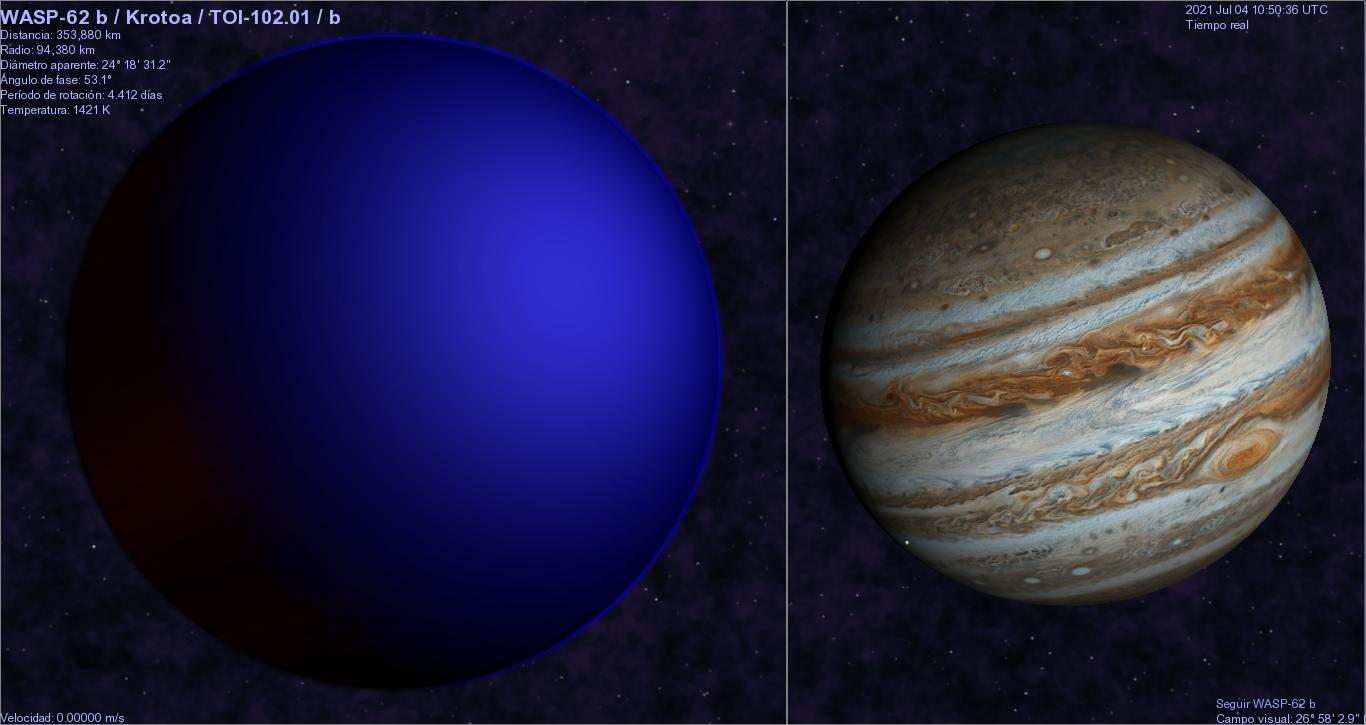
WASP-62b (artist's impression) compared to Jupiter

A transiting hot Jupiter exoplanet orbiting WASP-62 was discovered in 2012 by WASP-South at the South African Astronomical Observatory. The planet's equilibrium temperature is 1,440±30 K, but the measured average temperature is colder at 1,329.6±44.8 K. In 2020, a transmission spectrum indicated the atmosphere of WASP-62b is free of clouds. It contains sodium and possibly silicon hydrides.

The planetary orbit is slightly misaligned to the equatorial plane of the star, with the misalignment angle equal to 19.4^{+5.1}_{−4.9}°. It is named Krotoa, after the Khoi interpreter of that name.

The WASP-62 planetary system
| Companion (in order from star) | Mass | Semimajor axis (AU) | Orbital period (days) | Eccentricity | Inclination (°) | Radius |
|---|---|---|---|---|---|---|
| b / Krotoa | 0.562±0.042 M_{J} | 0.05672+0.00075 −0.00079 | 4.4119530(30) | <0.075 | 88.30+0.90 −0.60 | 1.390±0.060 R_{J} |
