= WASP-60 =

Star in the constellation Pegasus

WASP-60 / Morava
Observation data Epoch J2000 Equinox J2000
- Constellation: Pegasus
- Right ascension: 23^{h} 46^{m} 39.9747^{s}
- Declination: +31° 09′ 21.374″
- Apparent magnitude (V): 12.18

Characteristics
- Evolutionary stage: Main sequence
- Spectral type: F9

Astrometry
Radial velocity (R_{v})	−26.38 km/s
Proper motion (μ)	RA: +30.247 mas/yr Dec.: −6.005 mas/yr
Parallax (π)	2.3243±0.0194 mas
Distance	1,400 ± 10 ly (430 ± 4 pc)

Details
Mass	1.229±0.026 M_{☉}
Radius	1.401±0.066 R_{☉}
Surface gravity (log g)	4.31±0.11 cgs
Temperature	6105±50 K
Metallicity [Fe/H]	0.26±0.07 dex
Rotation	34.8±2.7 d
Rotational velocity (v sin i)	3.8±0.6 km/s
Age	1.7±0.5 Gyr

Other designations
- Morava, TOI-6015, TIC 288246496, WASP-60, TYC 2767-1746-1, 2MASS J23463997+3109213

Database references
SIMBAD	data
Exoplanet Archive	data

WASP-60, also named Morava, is a F-type main-sequence star about 1,400 light-years away in the constellation Pegasus. The star's age is much younger than the Sun's at 1.7±0.5 billion years. WASP-60 is enriched in heavy elements, having 180% of the solar abundance of iron. The star does not have noticeable starspot activity, an unexpected observation for a relatively young star. The age of WASP-60 determined by different methods is highly discrepant though, and it may actually be an old star which experienced an episode of spin-up in the past.

A multiplicity survey in 2015 did not detect any stellar companions to WASP-60.

== Nomenclature ==
The designation WASP-60 comes from the Wide Angle Search for Planets.

This was one of the systems selected to be named in the 2019 NameExoWorlds campaign during the 100th anniversary of the IAU, which assigned each country a star and planet to be named. This system was assigned to Serbia. The approved names were Morava for the star and Vlasina for the planet, after the Morava and Vlasina rivers in Serbia.

== Planetary system ==
In 2012 a transiting hot Jupiter planet, WASP-60b, was detected on a tight, circular orbit. The planet was named Vlasina by Serbian astronomers in December 2019, after the Vlasina River, a tributary of the Morava. Its equilibrium temperature is 1479±35 K.

Measurement of the Rossiter–McLaughlin effect in 2018 revealed WASP-60b is on a retrograde orbit relative to the equatorial plane of the star, orbital obliquity equal to 129±17°.

The WASP-60 planetary system
Companion (in order from star)	Mass	Semimajor axis (AU)	Orbital period (days)	Eccentricity	Inclination	Radius
b (Vlasina)	0.560±0.036 M_{J}	0.05548±0.00040	4.3050040	<0.064	86.05±0.57°	1.225±0.069 R_{J}
