= WASP-42 =

Star in the constellation Centaurus

Observation data Epoch J2000 Equinox ICRS
- Constellation: Centaurus
- Right ascension: 12^{h} 51^{m} 55.5581^{s}
- Declination: −42° 04′ 25.096″
- Apparent magnitude (V): 12.6

Characteristics
- Evolutionary stage: main-sequence star
- Spectral type: K1V

Astrometry
Radial velocity (R_{v})	−4.22±0.41 km/s
Proper motion (μ)	RA: −49.875 mas/yr Dec.: 4.963 mas/yr
Parallax (π)	5.6209±0.0153 mas
Distance	580 ± 2 ly (177.9 ± 0.5 pc)

Details
Mass	0.881^{+0.086}_{−0.081} M_{☉}
Radius	0.850±0.035 R_{☉}
Luminosity	0.48 L_{☉}
Surface gravity (log g)	4.52 cgs
Temperature	5,259 K
Metallicity [Fe/H]	0.05±0.13 dex
Rotational velocity (v sin i)	2.70±0.40 km/s
Age	11.3^{+1.5}_{−4.8} Gyr

Other designations
- TOI-769, TIC 248075138, WASP-42, 2MASS J12515557-4204249

Database references
SIMBAD	data
Exoplanet Archive	data

WASP-42 is a K-type main-sequence star about 580 light-years away in the constellation Centaurus. Its surface temperature is 5315±79 K. WASP-42 is similar to the Sun in concentration of heavy elements, with metallicity ([Fe/H]) of 0.05±0.13, and is much older than the Sun at 11.3+1.5
−4.8 billion years. The star does exhibit starspot activity as is typical for its spectral class.

Multiplicity surveys did not detect any stellar companions to WASP-42 in 2017.

== Planetary system ==
In 2012, one planet, named WASP-42b, was discovered on a tight, mildly eccentric orbit. The planetary equilibrium temperature is 1,021±19 K.

The WASP-42 planetary system
Companion (in order from star)	Mass	Semimajor axis (AU)	Orbital period (days)	Eccentricity	Inclination (°)	Radius
b	0.501±0.034 M_{J}	0.0548^{+0.0017}_{−0.0018}	4.9816872±0.0000073	0.062^{+0.013}_{−0.011}	88.30^{+0.26}_{−0.23}	1.063±0.051 R_{J}
