= WASP-56 =

Star in the constellation Coma Berenices

Observation data Epoch J2000 Equinox ICRS
- Constellation: Coma Berenices
- Right ascension: 12^{h} 13^{m} 27.8908^{s}
- Declination: +23° 03′ 20.428″
- Apparent magnitude (V): 11.48

Characteristics
- Evolutionary stage: main sequence
- Spectral type: G6V

Astrometry
Radial velocity (R_{v})	5.97±0.80 km/s
Proper motion (μ)	RA: −36.695 mas/yr Dec.: 2.954 mas/yr
Parallax (π)	3.0471±0.0162 mas
Distance	1,070 ± 6 ly (328 ± 2 pc)

Details
Mass	1.107±0.024 M_{☉}
Radius	1.112^{+0.026}_{−0.022} R_{☉}
Surface gravity (log g)	4.45 ± 0.1 cgs
Temperature	5600 ± 100 K
Metallicity [Fe/H]	0.12±0.06 dex
Rotational velocity (v sin i)	1.5 ± 0.9 km/s
Age	6.2^{+3.0}_{−2.1} Gyr

Other designations
- Melotte 111 AV 561, TOI-1809, TIC 347329162, WASP-56, TYC 1986-1561-1, 2MASS J12132790+2303205

Database references
SIMBAD	data
Exoplanet Archive	data

WASP-56 is a sun-like star of spectral type G6 about 1,070 light-years away in the constellation of Coma Berenices. It has an apparent magnitude of 11.48. Observations at the Calar Alto Observatory using the lucky imaging technique detected a candidate companion star located 3.4 arcseconds away, however it was not known if this is an actual binary companion or an optical double. It was confirmed in 2019 using Gaia DR2 data.

== Planetary system ==
It has a planet that was discovered by transit photometry in 2011 by the SuperWASP program. Fourteen transits were observed over three watching seasons, each lasting 214 minutes and reducing the stars' brightness by 14 millimagnitudes. The planet has around 0.6 times the mass of Jupiter and an orbital period of 4.6 days. The planet possibly has a large core of heavy metals.

The WASP-56 planetary system
Companion (in order from star)	Mass	Semimajor axis (AU)	Orbital period (days)	Eccentricity	Inclination (°)	Radius
b	0.599^{+0.040}_{−0.039} M_{J}	0.05614^{+0.00040}_{−0.00041}	4.6171010±0.000003	<0.082	88.5+0.1 −0.2	1.092^{+0.035}_{−0.033} R_{J}
