= WASP-21 =

Star in the constellation Pegasus

WASP-21 / Tangra
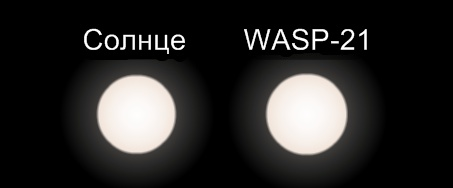
- Size comparison between Sun and WASP-21

Observation data Epoch J2000 Equinox ICRS
- Constellation: Pegasus
- Right ascension: 23^{h} 09^{m} 58.25^{s}
- Declination: +18° 23′ 45.9″
- Apparent magnitude (V): 11.58±0.08

Characteristics
- Evolutionary stage: subgiant
- Spectral type: G3V

Astrometry
Radial velocity (R_{v})	−89.21±0.46 km/s
Proper motion (μ)	RA: +17.567(21) mas/yr Dec.: +18.639(18) mas/yr
Parallax (π)	3.9089±0.0197 mas
Distance	834 ± 4 ly (256 ± 1 pc)
Absolute magnitude (M_{V})	4.97

Details
Mass	0.89±0.071 M_{☉}
Radius	1.136±0.049 R_{☉}
Luminosity	1.4 L_{☉}
Surface gravity (log g)	4.277±0.025 cgs
Temperature	5,800±100 K
Metallicity	−0.4±0.1
Metallicity [Fe/H]	−0.46±0.11 dex
Rotational velocity (v sin i)	1.5±0.6 km/s
Age	12±5 Gyr

Other designations
- Tangra, TOI-5963, TIC 436478932, WASP-21, GSC 01715-00679, 2MASS J23095825+1823459

Database references
SIMBAD	data
Exoplanet Archive	data

WASP-21, also named Tangra, is a G-type star (spectral type G3V) that has reached the end of its main sequence lifetime. It lies approximately 834 light-years away, in the constellation of Pegasus. The star is relatively metal-poor, having 40% of heavy elements compared to the Sun. Kinematically, WASP-21 belongs to the thick disk of the Milky Way. It has an exoplanet named WASP-21b.

A survey in 2012 failed to find any stellar companions to WASP-21.

== Naming ==
In 2019 the WASP-21 system was chosen as part of the NameExoWorlds campaign organised by the International Astronomical Union, which assigned each country a star and planet to be named. WASP-21 was assigned to Bulgaria. The winning proposal named the star Tangra after a deity worshipped by the early Bulgars, and the planet Bendida after a deity worshipped by the Thracians.

== Planetary system ==
In 2010 WASP-21 was discovered to host a hot Jupiter type planet by the Wide Angle Search for Planets (WASP), confirmed by radial velocity by the WASP team in 2010.

Transit-timing variation analysis in 2015 did not find any additional planets in the system.

In 2020, spectroscopic analysis found that the WASP-21b atmosphere is mostly cloudless and contains sodium.

The WASP-21 planetary system
Companion (in order from star)	Mass	Semimajor axis (AU)	Orbital period (days)	Eccentricity	Inclination (°)	Radius
b / Bendida	0.276 ± 0.018 M_{J}	0.0499 ± 0.0013	4.322482	<0.048	86.97 ± 0.33	1.162 R_{J}
