= WASP-57 =

Star in the constellation Libra

Observation data Epoch J2000 Equinox ICRS
- Constellation: Libra
- Right ascension: 14^{h} 55^{m} 16.82284^{s}
- Declination: −02° 03′ 27.5996″
- Apparent magnitude (V): 13.04

Characteristics
- Evolutionary stage: main sequence
- Spectral type: G6V

Astrometry
Radial velocity (R_{v})	−23.90±1.73 km/s
Proper motion (μ)	RA: -27.009 mas/yr Dec.: -4.655 mas/yr
Parallax (π)	2.4676±0.0162 mas
Distance	1,322 ± 9 ly (405 ± 3 pc)

Details
Mass	0.886±0.061 M_{☉}
Radius	0.927±0.031 R_{☉}
Surface gravity (log g)	4.452±0.024 cgs
Temperature	5600±100 K
Metallicity [Fe/H]	-0.25±0.1 dex
Rotation	12.7±4.5 days
Rotational velocity (v sin i)	3.7±1.3 km/s
Age	0.957±0.518 Gyr

Other designations
- TOI-5673, TIC 175772482, WASP-57, GSC 04991-00565, 2MASS J14551682-0203275

Database references
SIMBAD	data
Exoplanet Archive	data

WASP-57 is a single G-type main-sequence star about 1,322 light-years away in the constellation Libra. WASP-57 is depleted in heavy elements, having 55% of the solar abundance of iron. WASP-57 is much younger than the Sun at 0.957±0.518 billion years.

A multiplicity survey in 2015 did not detect any stellar companions to WASP-57.

== Planetary system ==
In 2012 a transiting hot Jupiter planet, WASP-57b, was detected on a tight, circular orbit around WASP-57. The planetary equilibrium temperature is 1338±29 K.

The WASP-57 planetary system
Companion (in order from star)	Mass	Semimajor axis (AU)	Orbital period (days)	Eccentricity	Inclination (°)	Radius
b	0.643^{+0.056}_{−0.054} M_{J}	0.03772^{+0.00083}_{−0.00089}	2.83891856±0.00000081	<0.059	86.05±0.20	1.050±0.052 R_{J}
