= WASP-61 =

Star in the constellation Lepus

Observation data Epoch J2000 Equinox ICRS
- Constellation: Lepus
- Right ascension: 05^{h} 01^{m} 11.91868^{s}
- Declination: −26° 03′ 14.9676″
- Apparent magnitude (V): 12.49

Characteristics
- Evolutionary stage: Main sequence
- Spectral type: F7V

Astrometry
Radial velocity (R_{v})	18.90±0.75 km/s
Proper motion (μ)	RA: 0.532 mas/yr Dec.: 3.233 mas/yr
Parallax (π)	2.0649±0.0094 mas
Distance	1,580 ± 7 ly (484 ± 2 pc)

Details
Mass	1.22±0.07 M_{☉}
Radius	1.36±0.03 R_{☉}
Surface gravity (log g)	4.21±0.21 cgs
Temperature	6265±168 K
Metallicity [Fe/H]	-0.38±0.11 dex
Rotational velocity (v sin i)	10.3±0.5 km/s
Age	3.8^{+1.8}_{−0.9} Gyr

Other designations
- TOI-439, TIC 13021029, WASP-61, TYC 6469-1972-1, 2MASS J05011191-2603149

Database references
SIMBAD	data
Exoplanet Archive	data

WASP-61 is a single F-type main-sequence star about 1,580 light-years away in the constellation Lepus. The star is likely younger than the Sun at approximately 3.8^{+1.8}_{−0.9} billion years. WASP-61 is depleted in heavy elements, having just 40% of the solar abundance of iron.

== Planetary system ==
In 2012 a transiting superjovian planet, WASP-61b, was detected on a tight, circular orbit. Its equilibrium temperature is 1565±35 K.

The planetary orbit is well aligned with the equatorial plane of the star, misalignment equal to 4.0^{+17.1}_{−18.4}°.

The WASP-61 planetary system
Companion (in order from star)	Mass	Semimajor axis (AU)	Orbital period (days)	Eccentricity	Inclination (°)	Radius
b	2.05^{+0.18}_{−0.17} M_{J}	0.05146^{+0.00097}_{−0.00099}	3.8559000±0.000003	<0.074	89.35^{+0.45}_{−0.66}	1.41±0.22 R_{J}
