= WASP-55 =

Star in constellation of Virgo

Observation data Epoch J2000 Equinox ICRS
- Constellation: Virgo
- Right ascension: 13^{h} 35^{m} 01.9538^{s}
- Declination: −17° 30′ 12.528″
- Apparent magnitude (V): 11.75

Characteristics
- Evolutionary stage: Main sequence
- Spectral type: G1

Astrometry
Radial velocity (R_{v})	−3.31±0.87 km/s
Proper motion (μ)	RA: +12.037 mas/yr Dec.: −3.747 mas/yr
Parallax (π)	3.4194±0.0204 mas
Distance	954 ± 6 ly (292 ± 2 pc)

Details
Mass	1.16±0.03 M_{☉}
Radius	1.11±0.01 R_{☉}
Luminosity	1.48 L_{☉}
Surface gravity (log g)	4.413±0.006 cgs
Temperature	6,070+51 −46 K
Metallicity [Fe/H]	0.09±0.05 dex
Rotational velocity (v sin i)	3.1±1.0 km/s
Age	1.1+0.8 −0.6 Gyr

Other designations
- EPIC 212300977, TOI-774, TIC 294301883, WASP-55, TYC 6125-113-1, 2MASS J13350194-1730124

Database references
SIMBAD	data
Exoplanet Archive	data

WASP-55 is a G-type main-sequence star about 954 light-years away in the constellation Virgo. The star is much younger than the Sun at approximately 1.1+0.8
−0.6 billion years. WASP-55 is similar to the Sun in concentration of heavy elements.

A multiplicity survey in 2016 found one candidate stellar companion to WASP-55 at a projected separation of 4.435″±0.018″. Follow-up observations in 2017 were unable to confirm if the suspected companion red dwarf star, with a temperature of 3,340±90 K, is gravitationally bound to WASP-55 or not. It was confirmed in 2019 using Gaia DR2 data.

== Planetary system ==
In 2012 a transiting hot Jupiter planet, WASP-55b, was detected on a tight, circular orbit. Its equilibrium temperature is 1,305 K.

The WASP-55 planetary system
Companion (in order from star)	Mass	Semimajor axis (AU)	Orbital period (days)	Eccentricity	Inclination (°)	Radius
b	0.62±0.04 M_{J}	0.0558±0.0006	4.4656291(11)	<0.056	89.0±0.2	1.34±0.01 R_{J}
