= BD−07 436 =

Star in the constellation Cetus

BD−07°436
Observation data Epoch J2000 Equinox ICRS
- Constellation: Cetus
- A
- Right ascension: 02^{h} 28^{m} 37.228^{s}
- Declination: −07° 03′ 38.38″
- Apparent magnitude (V): 10.29
- B
- Right ascension: 02^{h} 28^{m} 37.324^{s}
- Declination: −07° 03′ 41.28″
- Apparent magnitude (V): 13.4

Characteristics

A
- Evolutionary stage: main-sequence star
- Spectral type: G8V

B
- Evolutionary stage: main-sequence star
- Spectral type: K5

Astrometry

A
Radial velocity (R_{v})	+1.44±0.17 km/s
Proper motion (μ)	RA: +93.708 mas/yr Dec.: −1.717 mas/yr
Parallax (π)	9.4629±0.0183 mas
Distance	344.7 ± 0.7 ly (105.7 ± 0.2 pc)

B
Radial velocity (R_{v})	+3.22±1.63 km/s
Proper motion (μ)	RA: +94.240 mas/yr Dec.: −3.787 mas/yr
Parallax (π)	9.5080±0.0183 mas
Distance	343.0 ± 0.7 ly (105.2 ± 0.2 pc)
Absolute magnitude (M_{V})	7.2

Orbit
Primary	BD−07 436A
Secondary	BD−07 436B
Semi-major axis (a)	3.3" (461^{+200}_{−140} AU)
Eccentricity (e)	0.51^{+0.26}_{−0.22}
Inclination (i)	77^{+5}_{−7}°

Details

BD−07 436A
Mass	0.903^{+0.066}_{−0.059} M_{☉}
Radius	0.910^{+0.025}_{−0.023} R_{☉}
Luminosity	0.743^{+0.065}_{−0.058} L_{☉}
Surface gravity (log g)	4.42±0.03 cgs
Temperature	5615±9 K
Metallicity [Fe/H]	−0.10^{+0.10}_{−0.11} dex
Rotation	15.4±0.5
Rotational velocity (v sin i)	4.0±0.2 km/s
Age	7.99+1.90 −1.71 Gyr

BD−07 436B
Mass	0.71±0.06 M_{☉}
Radius	0.69±0.12 R_{☉}
Surface gravity (log g)	4.6±0.15 cgs
Temperature	5570±240 K
Metallicity [Fe/H]	-0.11±0.19 dex
Rotational velocity (v sin i)	2.8±0.5 km/s
Age	7.3+4.4 −4.6 Gyr

Other designations
- WASP-77, 2MASS J02283722-0703384
- A: TOI-398, TIC 1129033, TYC 4697-201-1
- B: TIC 632613066

Database references
SIMBAD	data
- A
- B

BD−07 436, also known as WASP-77 since 2012, is a binary star system about 344 light-years away. The BD−07 436 system's concentration of heavy elements is similar to the Sun. Its stars display moderate chromospheric activity, including x-ray flares.

The primary is a G-type main-sequence star, BD−07 436A (WASP-77A). The star is rotating rapidly, being spun up by the tides raised by the giant planet WASP-77Ab on its close orbit. The secondary is a K-type main-sequence star BD−07 436B orbiting at a distance of 461^{+200}_{−140} AU.

When calculated using spin rates, the two components appear to have different ages, with the secondary one billion years old, while the primary's age is 0.4 billion years. When calculated from X-ray luminosity, the ages are radically different and even more inconsistent at 4.5 and >8.9 billion years respectively. These ages may be unreliable, with the spin rates and X-ray luminosities affected by binary evolution, and ages inferred from the stars' positions in the H-R diagram are 7.99 and 7.3 billion years respectively.

== Planetary system ==
In 2012 a transiting hot Jupiter planet b was detected on a very tight, circular orbit. The planet may have an extended gaseous envelope and is losing mass. Its equilibrium temperature is 1715^{+26}_{−25} K, the nightside temperature is 1786±84 K, and dayside planetary temperature is 1842^{+34}_{−33} K.

Water vapour was detected on the planetary dayside of WASP-77Ab, indicating C/O ratio similar to solar or even lower.

The BD−07 436A planetary system
Companion (in order from star)	Mass	Semimajor axis (AU)	Orbital period (days)	Eccentricity	Inclination (°)	Radius
Ab	1.667^{+0.068}_{−0.064} M_{J}	0.02335^{+0.00045}_{−0.00043}	1.36002854±0.00000062	0.0074^{+0.0069}_{−0.0049}	88.91^{+0.74}_{−0.95}	1.230^{+0.031}_{−0.029} R_{J}
