= WASP-59 =

Star in the constellation Pegasus

Observation data Epoch J2000 Equinox ICRS
- Constellation: Pegasus
- Right ascension: 23^{h} 18^{m} 29.54747^{s}
- Declination: +24° 53′ 21.4386″
- Apparent magnitude (V): 12.78

Characteristics
- Evolutionary stage: Main sequence
- Spectral type: K5V

Astrometry
Radial velocity (R_{v})	−57.07±0.44 km/s
Proper motion (μ)	RA: −33.675 mas/yr Dec.: −2.675 mas/yr
Parallax (π)	8.6178±0.0140 mas
Distance	378.5 ± 0.6 ly (116.0 ± 0.2 pc)

Details
Mass	0.719±0.035 M_{☉}
Radius	0.613±0.044 R_{☉}
Surface gravity (log g)	4.72±0.06 cgs
Temperature	4650±150 K
Metallicity [Fe/H]	-0.15±0.11 dex
Rotational velocity (v sin i)	2.3±1.5 km/s
Age	7±7 Gyr

Other designations
- TOI-5969, TIC 91051152, WASP-59, 2MASS J23182955+2453214

Database references
SIMBAD	data
Exoplanet Archive	data

WASP-59 is a K-type main-sequence star about 379 light-years away in the constellation Pegasus. The star's age is essentially unconstrained by observations. WASP-59 is slightly depleted in heavy elements, having 70% of the solar abundance of iron. The star produces extremely low levels of ultraviolet light, indicating an absence of flare activity.

A multiplicity survey in 2015 did not detect any stellar companions to WASP-59.

== Planetary system ==
In 2012 a transiting hot Jupiter planet, WASP-59b, was detected on a tight, mildly eccentric orbit.

Its equilibrium temperature is 670±35 K. The planet is unusually dense for a gas giant, representing an outlier on the mass-radius diagram.

The WASP-59 planetary system
Companion (in order from star)	Mass	Semimajor axis (AU)	Orbital period (days)	Eccentricity	Inclination (°)	Radius
b	0.857^{+0.046}_{−0.047} M_{J}	0.0697±0.0011	7.919585±0.000010	0.101^{+0.046}_{−0.048}	89.27±0.52	0.775±0.068 R_{J}
