= Obsession Telescopes =

American optical telescope company

- Founded: Lake Mills, Wisconsin, USA (January 1, 1989)
- Founder: David Kriege
- Headquarters: Lake Mills, USA
- Area served: Worldwide
- Key people: David Kriege
- Products: Dobsonian telescopes
- Website: obsessiontelescopes.com

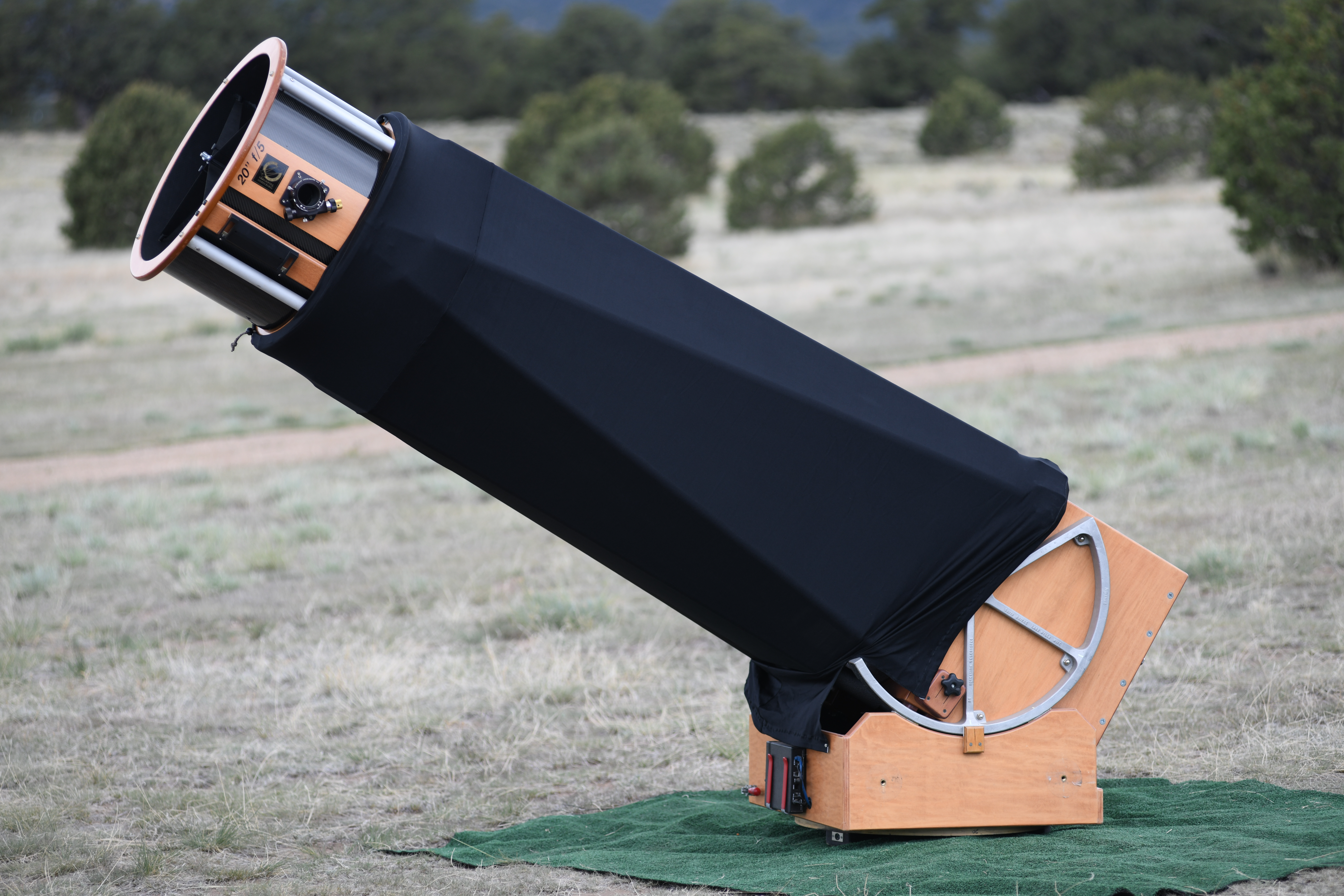
20" f/5 "Classic"

Obsession Telescopes is an American optical telescope company that specializes in the production of Dobsonian telescopes. The company was founded in 1989 by David Kriege, and is based in Lake Mills, Wisconsin and operates globally.

Obsession Telescopes builds two different styles of compact truss-style Dobsonian telescopes which can optionally be equipped with computerized positioning. The primary mirrors range from 12.5 inches to 25 inches in diameter and are supplied by Optical Mechanics, Inc. (OMI) and Ostahowski Optics, while secondary ones are supplied by United Lens. Accessories include the ServoCAT drive system, JMI focusers, and Wildcard Innovations' Argo Navis Digital Telescope Computer (DTC).

In 2007, Obsession Telescopes released a second series of telescopes more portable than their original design. They designated this series as Ultra Compact (UC), referring to their former one as 'Classic.' From 2009-2012 their telescopes ranged from USD 3000 for a 12.5 inch telescope, up to USD 12–15,000 for a 25-inch telescope. The company manufactured a limited number of 30-inch and 36-inch telescopes. In 2009, it assisted OMI in the design of the OMI Evolution-30.

The Obsession 18-inch f/4.2 UC (Ultra Compact) won a Sky & Telescope Magazine Hot Product of 2008 Award.

== See also ==
- Meade Instruments
- Celestron
