= WASP-84 =

Star in the constellation Hydra

Observation data Epoch J2000 Equinox ICRS
- Constellation: Hydra
- Right ascension: 08^{h} 44^{m} 25.70315^{s}
- Declination: +01° 51′ 36.1055″
- Apparent magnitude (V): 10.83

Characteristics
- Evolutionary stage: main sequence
- Spectral type: G9V

Astrometry
Radial velocity (R_{v})	−11.63±0.21 km/s
Proper motion (μ)	RA: −23.344 mas/yr Dec.: −31.570 mas/yr
Parallax (π)	9.9636±0.0149 mas
Distance	327.3 ± 0.5 ly (100.4 ± 0.2 pc)

Details
Mass	0.842^{+0.037}_{−0.036} M_{☉}
Radius	0.748±0.015 R_{☉}
Luminosity	0.48 L_{☉}
Surface gravity (log g)	4.63±0.06 cgs
Temperature	5350±31 K
Metallicity [Fe/H]	0.05±0.02 dex
Rotation	14.36±0.35 d
Rotational velocity (v sin i)	4.10±0.30 km/s
Age	8.5^{+4.1}_{−5.5} Gyr

Other designations
- BD+02 2056, WASP-84, TYC 211-706-1, GSC 00211-00706, 2MASS J08442570+0151361, Gaia DR2 3078836109158636928

Database references
SIMBAD	data

WASP-84, also known as BD+02 2056, is a G-type main-sequence star 327 light-years (100 parsecs) away in the constellation Hydra. Its surface temperature is 5350±31 K and is slightly enriched in heavy elements compared to the Sun, with a metallicity Fe/H index of 0.05±0.02. It is rich in carbon and depleted of oxygen. WASP-84's age is probably older than the Sun at 8.5^{+4.1}_{−5.5} billion years. The star appears to have an anomalously small radius, which can be explained by the unusually high helium fraction or by it being very young.

A multiplicity survey did not detect any stellar companions to WASP-84 as of 2015.

== Planetary system ==
In 2013, one exoplanet, named WASP-84b, was discovered on a tight, circular orbit. The planet is a hot Jupiter that cannot have formed in its current location and likely migrated from elsewhere. The planetary orbit is well aligned with the equatorial plane of the star, misalignment being equal to 0.3±1.7°. Planetary equilibrium temperature is 832±13 K.

In 2023, a second planet was discovered around WASP-84. This appears to be a dense rocky planet despite its high mass, comparable to Uranus.

The WASP-84 planetary system
Companion (in order from star)	Mass	Semimajor axis (AU)	Orbital period (days)	Eccentricity	Inclination (°)	Radius
c	15.2+4.5 −4.2 M_{🜨}	0.02359±0.00100	1.4468849+0.0000022 −0.0000016	—	83.20+0.51 −0.49	1.95±0.12 R_{🜨}
b	0.692±0.058 M_{J}	0.0778±0.0021	8.52349648(60)	<0.077	88.292+0.045 −0.042	0.956±0.024 R_{J}
