= WASP-69 =

Star in the constellation Aquarius

WASP-69 / Wouri
Observation data Epoch J2000 Equinox ICRS
- Constellation: Aquarius
- Right ascension: 21^{h} 00^{m} 06.19682^{s}
- Declination: −05° 05′ 40.0349″
- Apparent magnitude (V): 9.87±0.03

Characteristics
- Evolutionary stage: main sequence
- Spectral type: K5V

Astrometry
Radial velocity (R_{v})	−9.83±0.13 km/s
Proper motion (μ)	RA: 33.778 mas/yr Dec.: −93.581 mas/yr
Parallax (π)	19.8858±0.0170 mas
Distance	164.0 ± 0.1 ly (50.29 ± 0.04 pc)

Details
Mass	0.826±0.029 M_{☉}
Radius	0.813 R_{☉}
Luminosity	0.34 L_{☉}
Surface gravity (log g)	4.59±0.02 cgs
Temperature	4,782±15 K
Metallicity [Fe/H]	0.10±0.01 dex
Rotation	23.07 d
Rotational velocity (v sin i)	1.27±0.22 km/s
Age	2 Gyr

Other designations
- Wouri, BD−05 5432, TOI-5823, TIC 248853232, WASP-69, TYC 5200-1560-1, GSC 05200-01560, 2MASS J21000618-0505398

Database references
SIMBAD	data
Exoplanet Archive	data

WASP-69, also named Wouri, is a K-type main-sequence star 164 light-years (50 parsecs) away from Earth in the constellation Aquarius. Its surface temperature is 4782±15 K. WASP-69 is slightly enriched in heavy elements compared to the Sun, with a metallicity Fe/H index of 0.10±0.01, and is much younger than the Sun at 2 billion years. The data regarding starspot activity of WASP-69 are inconclusive, but spot coverage of the photosphere may be very high.

Multiplicity surveys did not detect any stellar companions to WASP-69 as of 2020.

== Nomenclature ==
The designation WASP-69 indicates that this was the 69th star found to have a planet by the Wide Angle Search for Planets.

In August 2022, this planetary system was included among 20 systems to be named by the third NameExoWorlds project. The approved names, proposed by a team from Cameroon, were announced in June 2023. WASP-69 is named Wouri and its planet is named Makombé, after the Wouri and Makombé rivers in Cameroon.

== Planetary system ==
In 2013, one planet, named WASP-69b, was discovered on a tight, circular orbit. Its equilibrium temperature is 886 K, but the measured terminator temperature is significantly higher by at least 200 K. The planet is losing mass at a moderate rate of 0.5 M_{🜨} per billion years, producing a tail detected in 2024 and measured to be at least 7 times its own radius.

The planetary atmosphere is extremely hazy and contains a partial cloud deck with cloud tops rising to a pressure of 100 Pa. Its composition is mostly hydrogen and helium, and sodium was also detected in low concentration. The sodium may originate from volcanic moons, not from the planet itself.

By 2021, the presence of hazes in atmosphere of WASP-69b was confirmed, along with a solar or super-solar water abundance.

The WASP-69 planetary system
Companion (in order from star)	Mass	Semimajor axis (AU)	Orbital period (days)	Eccentricity	Inclination (°)	Radius
b / Makombé	0.260±0.017 M_{J}	0.04525±0.00053	3.8681382±0.0000017	0	86.71±0.20	0.945+0.007 −0.017 R_{J}
