= Phoenix in Chinese astronomy =

The modern constellation Phoenix lies across one of the quadrants symbolized by the White Tiger of the West (西方白虎, Xī Fāng Bái Hǔ), and The Southern Asterisms (近南極星區, Jìnnánjíxīngōu), that divide the sky in traditional Chinese uranography.

According to the quadrant, constellation Phoenix in Chinese sky is not fully seen. Ankaa (Alpha Phoenicis) are bright stars in this constellation that possibly never seen in Chinese sky.

The name of the western constellation in modern Chinese is 鳳凰座 (fèng huáng zuò), which means "the phoenix constellation".

== Stars ==
The map of Chinese constellation in constellation Phoenix area consists of :

Four Symbols	Mansion (Chinese name)	Romanization	Translation	Asterisms (Chinese name)	Romanization	Translation	Western star name	Proper Name	Chinese star name	Romanization	Translation
White Tiger of the West (西方白虎)	畢	Bì	Net								
White Tiger of the West (西方白虎)	畢	Bì	Net	天園	Tiānyuán	Celestial Orchard	δ Phe		天園一	Tiānyuányī	1st star
-	近南極星區 (non-mansions)	Jìnnánjíxīngōu (non-mansions)	The Southern Asterisms (non-mansions)	火鳥	Huǒniǎo	Firebird					
-	近南極星區 (non-mansions)	Jìnnánjíxīngōu (non-mansions)	The Southern Asterisms (non-mansions)	火鳥	Huǒniǎo	Firebird	ι Phe		火鳥二	Huǒniǎoèr	2nd star
-	近南極星區 (non-mansions)	Jìnnánjíxīngōu (non-mansions)	The Southern Asterisms (non-mansions)	火鳥	Huǒniǎo	Firebird	σ Phe		火鳥三	Huǒniǎosān	3rd star
-	近南極星區 (non-mansions)	Jìnnánjíxīngōu (non-mansions)	The Southern Asterisms (non-mansions)	火鳥	Huǒniǎo	Firebird	ε Phe		火鳥四	Huǒniǎosì	4th star
-	近南極星區 (non-mansions)	Jìnnánjíxīngōu (non-mansions)	The Southern Asterisms (non-mansions)	火鳥	Huǒniǎo	Firebird	κ Phe		火鳥五	Huǒniǎowu	5th star
-	近南極星區 (non-mansions)	Jìnnánjíxīngōu (non-mansions)	The Southern Asterisms (non-mansions)	火鳥	Huǒniǎo	Firebird	α Phe	Ankaa			
-	近南極星區 (non-mansions)	Jìnnánjíxīngōu (non-mansions)	The Southern Asterisms (non-mansions)	火鳥	Huǒniǎo	Firebird	α Phe	Ankaa	火鳥六	Huǒniǎoliù	6th star
-	近南極星區 (non-mansions)	Jìnnánjíxīngōu (non-mansions)	The Southern Asterisms (non-mansions)	火鳥	Huǒniǎo	Firebird	α Phe	Ankaa	八魁距星	Bākuíjùxīng	Separated star of Net for Catching Birds constellation
-	近南極星區 (non-mansions)	Jìnnánjíxīngōu (non-mansions)	The Southern Asterisms (non-mansions)	火鳥	Huǒniǎo	Firebird	α Phe	Ankaa	八魁南大星	Bākuínándàxīng	Big star in the south of Net for Catching Birds constellation
-	近南極星區 (non-mansions)	Jìnnánjíxīngōu (non-mansions)	The Southern Asterisms (non-mansions)	火鳥	Huǒniǎo	Firebird	μ Phe		火鳥七	Huǒniǎoqī	7th star
-	近南極星區 (non-mansions)	Jìnnánjíxīngōu (non-mansions)	The Southern Asterisms (non-mansions)	火鳥	Huǒniǎo	Firebird	λ^{1} Phe		火鳥八	Huǒniǎobā	8th star
-	近南極星區 (non-mansions)	Jìnnánjíxīngōu (non-mansions)	The Southern Asterisms (non-mansions)	火鳥	Huǒniǎo	Firebird	β Phe		火鳥九	Huǒniǎojiǔ	9th star
-	近南極星區 (non-mansions)	Jìnnánjíxīngōu (non-mansions)	The Southern Asterisms (non-mansions)	火鳥	Huǒniǎo	Firebird	γ Phe		火鳥十	Huǒniǎoshí	10th star
-	近南極星區 (non-mansions)	Jìnnánjíxīngōu (non-mansions)	The Southern Asterisms (non-mansions)	火鳥	Huǒniǎo	Firebird	HD 222095		火鳥增一	Huǒniǎozēngshí	1st additional star
-	近南極星區 (non-mansions)	Jìnnánjíxīngōu (non-mansions)	The Southern Asterisms (non-mansions)	水委	Shuǐwěi	Crooked Running Water					
-	近南極星區 (non-mansions)	Jìnnánjíxīngōu (non-mansions)	The Southern Asterisms (non-mansions)	水委	Shuǐwěi	Crooked Running Water	ζ Phe	Wurren (for component Aa)	水委二	Shuǐwěièr	2nd star
-	近南極星區 (non-mansions)	Jìnnánjíxīngōu (non-mansions)	The Southern Asterisms (non-mansions)	水委	Shuǐwěi	Crooked Running Water	η Phe		水委三	Shuǐwěisān	3rd star

== See also ==
- Traditional Chinese star names
- Chinese constellations
- List of brightest stars
