= Alpha Phoenicis =

Orange-hued star in the constellation Phoenix

- Location of α Phoenicis (circled)

Observation data Epoch J2000 Equinox ICRS
- Constellation: Phoenix
- Right ascension: 00^{h} 26^{m} 17.06309^{s}
- Declination: −42° 18′ 21.7712″
- Apparent magnitude (V): 2.377

Characteristics
- Spectral type: K0.5 IIIb
- U−B color index: +0.903
- B−V color index: +1.092

Astrometry
Radial velocity (R_{v})	+74.6 km/s
Proper motion (μ)	RA: +176.268 mas/yr Dec.: −398.872 mas/yr
Parallax (π)	39.9183±0.7283 mas
Distance	82 ± 1 ly (25.1 ± 0.5 pc)
Absolute magnitude (M_{V})	0.52

Orbit
Period (P)	3848.8 days
Semi-major axis (a)	103.5 mas (Note: This is the photocentric semi-major axis, from the motion shown by the observed "star" relative to distant objects, and in practice relative to the barycentre. This is always smaller than the orbital semi-major axis, dramatically smaller when the primary star is much more massive than the secondary or when it is not much brighter.)
Eccentricity (e)	0.34
Inclination (i)	128.0±5.4°
Longitude of the node (Ω)	242.8±3.9°
Periastron epoch (T)	2416201.8 HJD
Argument of periastron (ω) (primary)	19.8°

Details
Mass	0.96±0.07 M_{☉}
Radius	13.39±0.29 R_{☉}
Luminosity	83 L_{☉}
Surface gravity (log g)	2.53 cgs
Temperature	4,770±250 K
Metallicity [Fe/H]	−0.73 dex
Rotational velocity (v sin i)	1.0 km/s

Other designations
- Ankaa, Nair al Zaurak, Cymbae, Lucida Cymbae, CD−42°116, FK5 12, GCTP 71.00, HIP 2081, HR 99, HD 2261, LTT 231, SAO 215093.

Database references
SIMBAD	data

Alpha Phoenicis (α Phoenicis, abbreviated Alpha Phe or α Phe), formally named Ankaa /ˈæŋkə/, (with the same pronunciation) is the brightest star in the constellation of Phoenix.

== Nomenclature ==
Alpha Phoenicis is the star's Bayer designation. It also bore the traditional name Ankaa sometime after 1800, from the Arabic العنقاء al-ʽanqāʼ "the phoenix" for the name of the constellation. The International Astronomical Union has formally adopted the Ankaa as the proper name for Alpha Phoenicis.

Medieval Arab astronomers formed the constellation of the dhow (where Phoenix is), so another popular name for the star is Nair al Zaurak from نائر الزورق nayyir az-zawraq "the bright (star) of the skiff". The Latin translation is Cymbae, from lūcida cumbae.

In Chinese caused by adaptation of the European southern hemisphere constellations into the Chinese system, 火鳥 (Huǒ Niǎo), meaning Firebird, refers to an asterism consisting of α Phoenicis, ι Phoenicis, σ Phoenicis, ε Phoenicis, κ Phoenicis, μ Phoenicis, λ^{1} Phoenicis, β Phoenicis and γ Phoenicis . Consequently, α Phoenicis itself is known as 火鳥六 (Huǒ Niǎo liù, English: the Sixth Star of Firebird.)

== Description ==
Alpha Phoenicis is a spectroscopic binary star system with components that orbit each other every 3,848.8 days (10.5 years). The combined stellar classification of the system is K0.5 IIIb, which matches the spectrum of a normal luminosity giant star. It has an apparent visual magnitude of 2.4, so it is somewhat outshone by its first magnitude neighbors Achernar (α Eridani) and Fomalhaut (α Piscis Austrini). Based upon parallax measurements, this system is at a distance of about 85 light-years (26 parsecs) from the Earth.
