= Lambda Phoenicis =

The Bayer designation λ Phoenicis (Lambda Phoenicis) is shared by two stars, in the constellation Phoenix:

- λ^{1} Phoenicis (HD 2834)
- λ^{2} Phoenicis (HD 3302)
