= BB Phoenicis =

Star in the constellation Phoenix

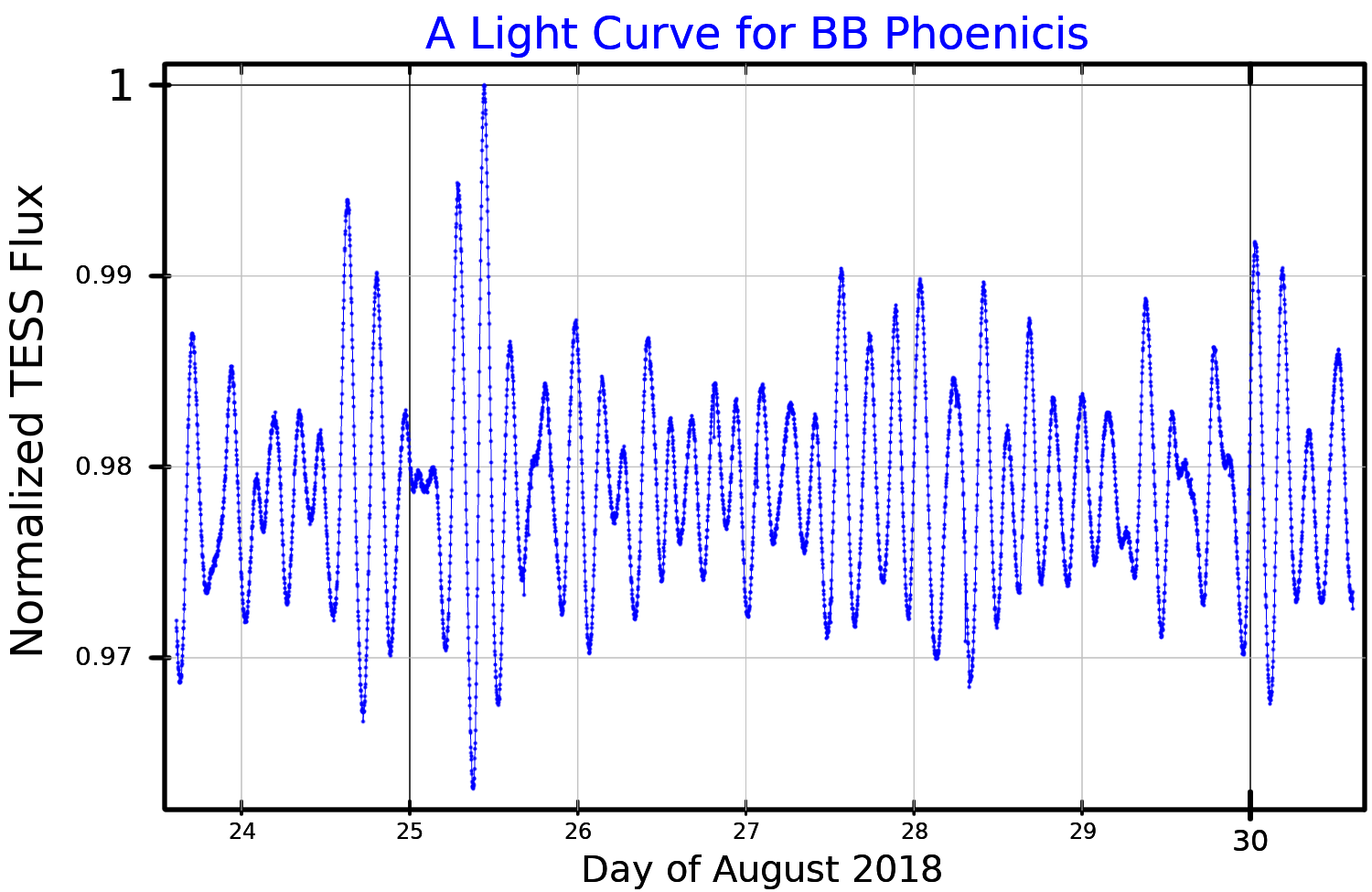
- A light curve for BB Phoenicis, plotted from TESS data

Observation data Epoch J2000 Equinox J2000
- Constellation: Phoenix
- Right ascension: 00^{h} 30^{m} 27.825^{s}
- Declination: −40° 56′ 22.51″
- Apparent magnitude (V): 6.18

Characteristics
- Spectral type: F0/2III
- Variable type: δ Scuti

Astrometry
Radial velocity (R_{v})	−3.6 km/s
Proper motion (μ)	RA: −3.40 mas/yr Dec.: 16.95 mas/yr
Parallax (π)	7.2816±0.0397 mas
Distance	448 ± 2 ly (137.3 ± 0.7 pc)
Absolute magnitude (M_{V})	0.57±0.20

Details
Mass	2.25±0.10 M_{☉}
Radius	4.7±0.3 R_{☉}
Luminosity	55.2+5.4 −9.3 L_{☉}
Surface gravity (log g)	3.44±0.03 cgs
Temperature	7,200±100 K
Rotation	2.17 days
Rotational velocity (v sin i)	82±2 km/s

Other designations
- BB Phe, CD−41°116, HD 2724, HIP 2388, HR 119, SAO 215120

Database references
SIMBAD	data

BB Phoenicis is a variable star in the constellation of Phoenix. It has an average visual apparent magnitude of 6.17, being visible to the naked eye with excellent viewing conditions. From parallax measurements by the Gaia spacecraft, it is located at a distance of 448 light-years (137 parsecs) from Earth. Its absolute magnitude is calculated at 0.6.

BB Phoenicis is a Delta Scuti variable, and shows stellar pulsations that cause brightness variations with an amplitude of 0.04 magnitudes. Its variability was discovered by accident in 1981, when the star was used as a comparison star for the eclipsing binary AG Phoenicis. Photometric and spectroscopic data have allowed the detection of at least 13 modes of radial and non-radial pulsations, the strongest one having a period of 0.174 days and an amplitude of 11.1 milli-magnitudes. Observations in different epochs show evidence that the pulsations modes vary in amplitude, which is common among Delta Scuti variables. Pulsation models indicate that the stellar rotation axis is inclined by 50–70° in relation to the line of sight.

This star is classified as an F-type giant with a spectral type of F0/2III. It appears to be expanding after depleting all the nuclear hydrogen and leaving the main sequence. BB Phoenicis has an estimated mass of 2.25 times the solar mass and a radius of 4.7 times the solar radius. It is radiating 55 times the Sun's luminosity from its photosphere at an effective temperature of 7,200 K.
