= NGC 37 =

Galaxy located in the constellation Phoenix

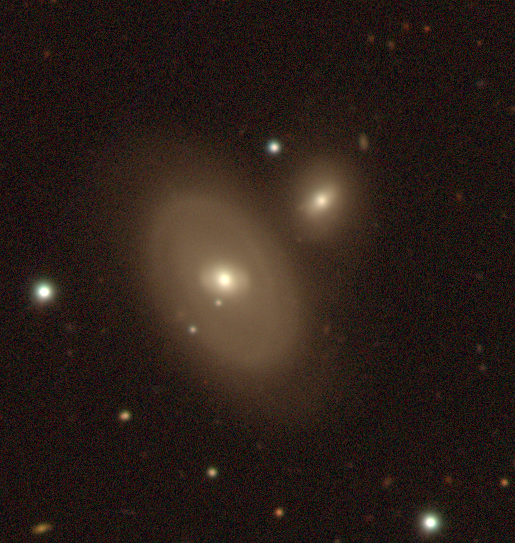
- NGC 37 by DECam. The galaxy right next to it is called LEDA 95382.

Observation data (J2000 epoch)
- Constellation: Phoenix
- Right ascension: 00^{h} 11^{m} 22.93^{s}
- Declination: −56° 57′ 26.4″
- Redshift: 0.032606
- Heliocentric radial velocity: 9775 ± 45 km/s
- Distance: 151.36 Mpc (493,68 million ly); Redshift-based
- Apparent magnitude (V): 14.66

Characteristics
- Type: (RL)SAB0^{0}
- Apparent size (V): 1.1′ × 0.7'

Other designations
- PGC 801, ESO 149-22, 2MASX J00112290-5657264, SGC 000855-5714.1, 6dFGS gJ001122.9-565726, [CHM2007] LDC 7 J001122.90-5657264 Gaia DR3 4919494715236325504

NGC 37 is a lenticular galaxy located in the constellation Phoenix. It is approximately 42 kiloparsecs (137,000 light-years) in diameter and about 12.9 billion years old.

It may have a companion galaxy called PGC 95382. Its redshift and radial velocity (z=0.03007 & V=8880 km/s) are really similar so it can be situated quite close to NGC 37.

== Group membership ==
NGC 37 is a member of SCG2 0009-5713, a compact galaxy group. Its other members are PGC 128413, a spiral galaxy, PGC 128414, a lenticular galaxy similar to NGC 37 and PGC 95382. The galaxy group's redshift is probably around 0.031000 because most of its members have a similar value.

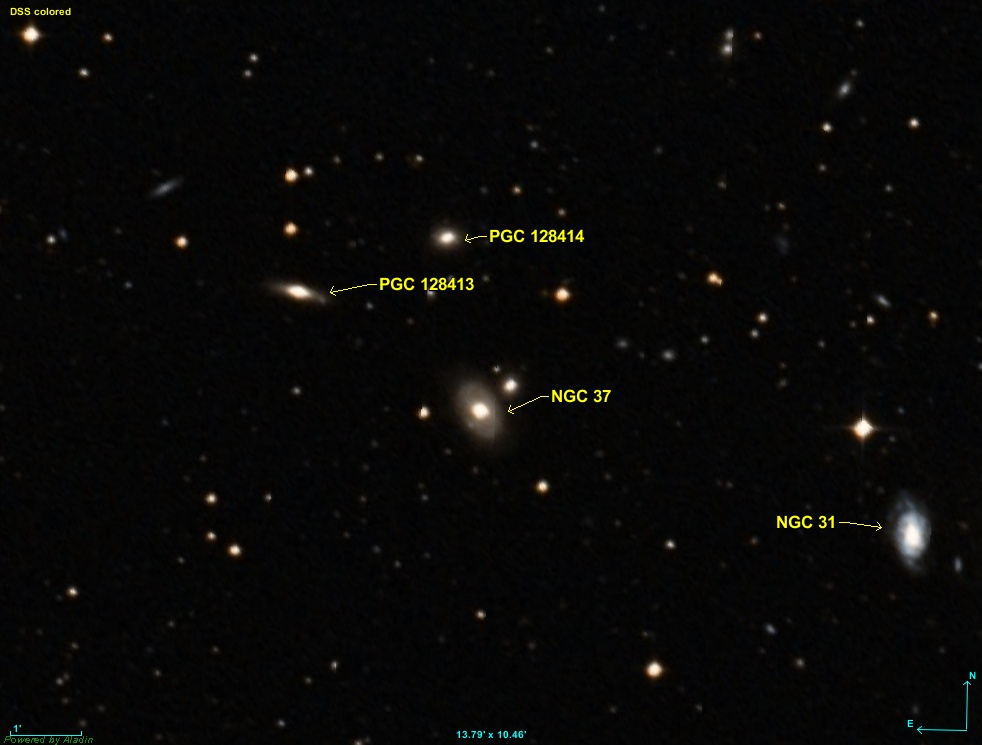
NGC 37 by DSS

== See also ==
- NGC
- List of NGC objects (1–1000)
- List of NGC objects
- Galaxy
