= NGC 692 =

Galaxy in the constellation Phoenix

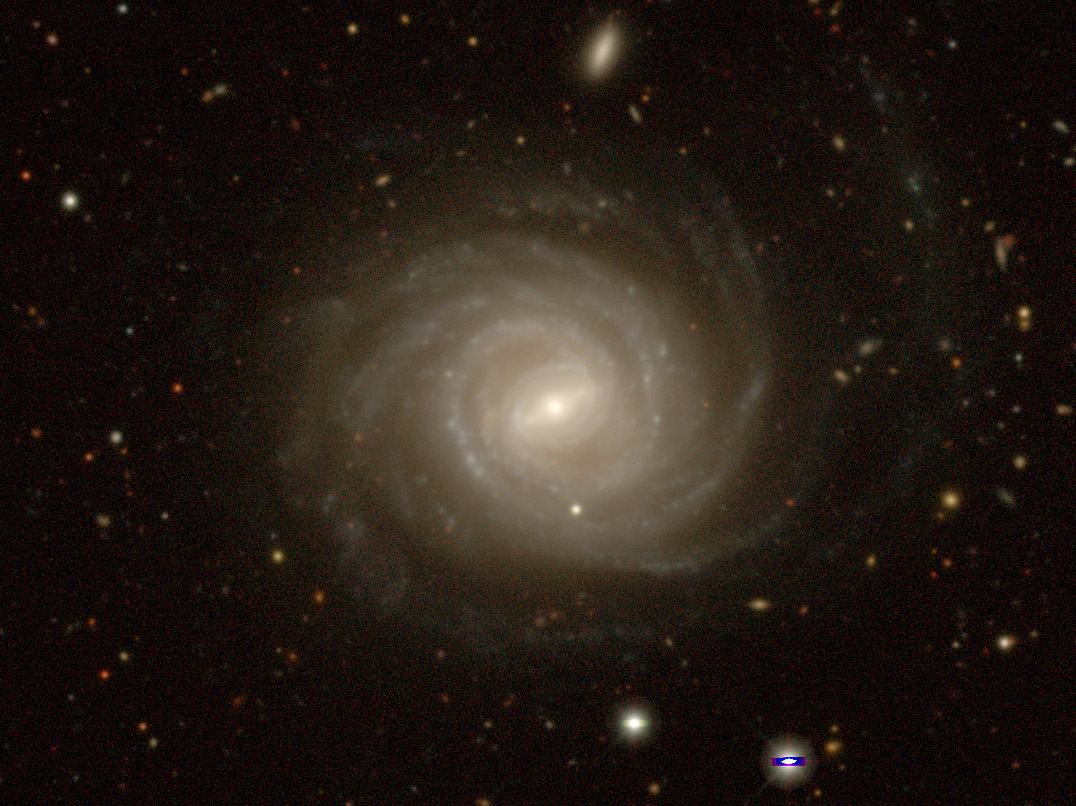
- NGC 692 imaged by Legacy Surveys

Observation data (J2000 epoch)
- Constellation: Phoenix
- Right ascension: 01^{h} 48^{m} 41.9528^{s}
- Declination: −48° 38′ 54.460″
- Redshift: 0.021181±0.0000300
- Heliocentric radial velocity: 6,350±9 km/s
- Distance: 298.0 ± 20.9 Mly (91.37 ± 6.40 Mpc)
- Apparent magnitude (V): 13.05

Characteristics
- Type: (R')SB(r)bc
- Size: ~313,100 ly (96.01 kpc) (estimated)
- Apparent size (V): 2.1′ × 1.8′

Other designations
- ESO 197- G 003, IRAS 01467-4853, 2MASX J01484201-4838542, PGC 6642

NGC 692 is a barred spiral galaxy in the constellation of Phoenix. Its velocity with respect to the cosmic microwave background is 6,088±24 km/s, which corresponds to a Hubble distance of 292.9 ± 20.5 Mly (89.79 ± 6.30 Mpc). It was discovered by British astronomer John Herschel on 2 October 1834.

NGC 692 has a possible active galactic nucleus, i.e. it has a compact region at the center of a galaxy that emits a significant amount of energy across the electromagnetic spectrum, with characteristics indicating that this luminosity is not produced by the stars.

== Supernovae ==
Two supernovae have been observed in NGC 692:

- SN 2007st (Type Ia, mag. 15.0) was discovered by Berto Monard on 22 December 2007.
- SN 2010aa (Type Ia, mag. 16.4) was discovered by Berto Monard on 9 February 2010.

== See also ==
- List of NGC objects (1–1000)
