= NGC 98 =

Galaxy in the constellation of Phoenix

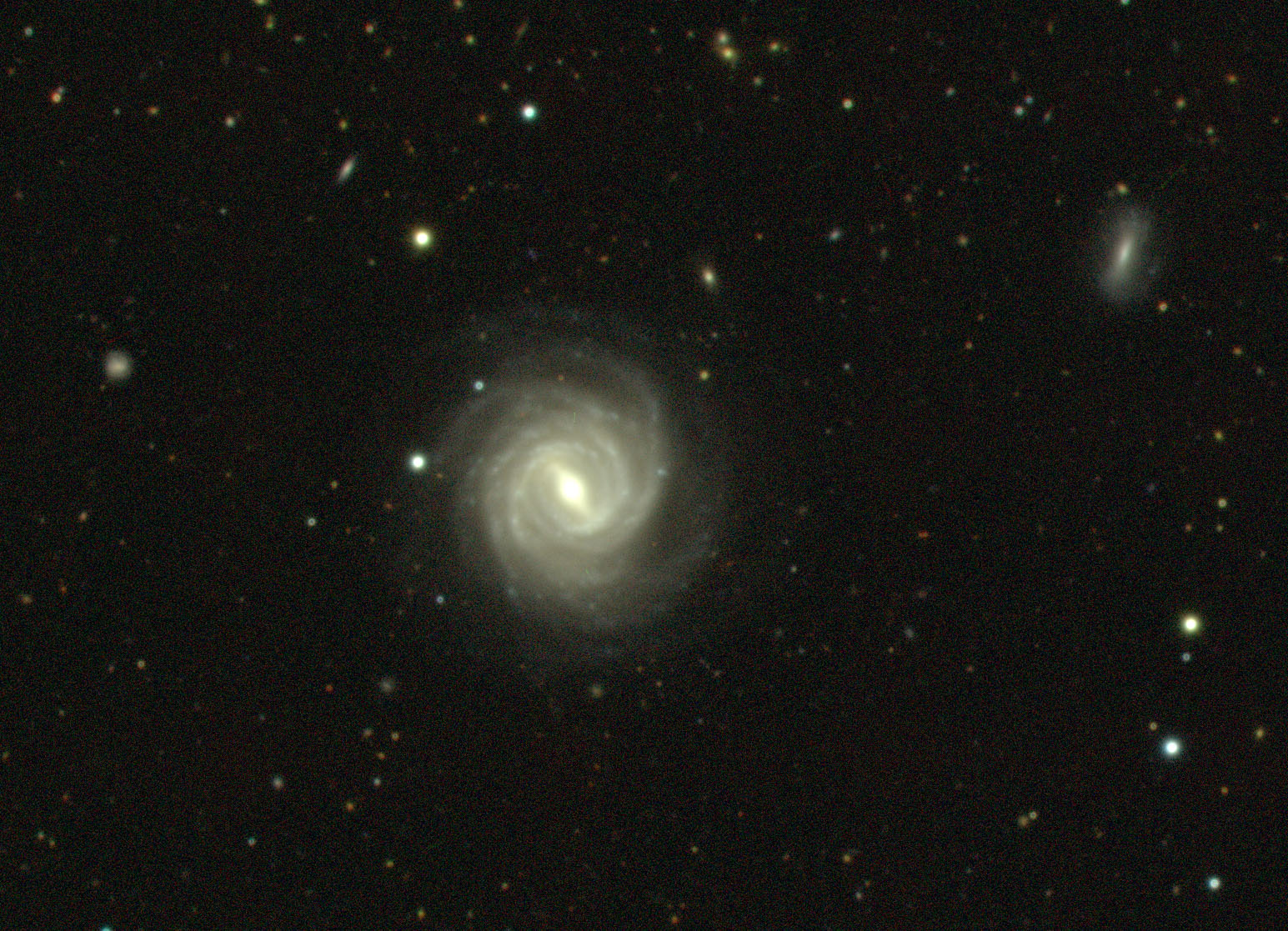
- DECam image of NGC 98. The smaller galaxy to the right is LEDA 528829.

Observation data (J2000 epoch)
- Constellation: Phoenix
- Right ascension: 00^{h} 22^{m} 49.518^{s}
- Declination: −45° 16′ 08.43″
- Redshift: 0.020599
- Heliocentric radial velocity: 6175
- Distance: 290 Mly (89 Mpc)
- Apparent magnitude (B): 13.59

Characteristics
- Type: SB(rs)bc
- Size: 185,400 ly (56,850 pc)
- Apparent size (V): 2.3′ × 1.8′

Other designations
- ESO 242-5, PGC 1463

NGC 98 is a barred spiral galaxy in the constellation Phoenix. The galaxy NGC 98 was discovered on September 6, 1834, by the British astronomer John Frederick William Herschel.
