= NGC 319 =

Galaxy in the constellation Phoenix

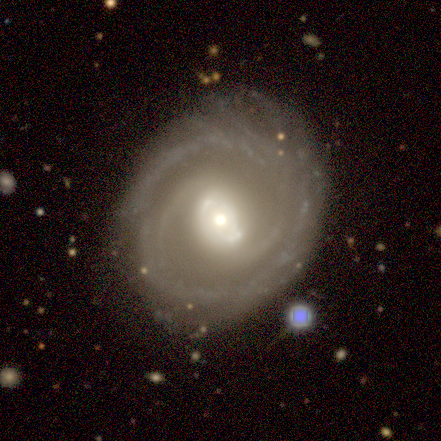
- NGC 319 as seen by DECam

Observation data (J2000 epoch)
- Constellation: Phoenix
- Right ascension: 00^{h} 56^{m} 57.6^{s}
- Declination: −43° 50′ 20″
- Redshift: 0.023159
- Heliocentric radial velocity: 6,943 km/s
- Apparent magnitude (V): 14.21

Characteristics
- Type: SAB(s)a:
- Apparent size (V): 1.0' × 0.8'

Other designations
- ESO 243- G 013, MCG -07-03-001, 2MASX J00565761-4350196, IRAS F00546-4406, ESO-LV 2430130, 6dF J0056575-435020, PGC 3398.

NGC 319 is a spiral galaxy in the constellation Phoenix. It was first discovered on September 5, 1834 by John Herschel.
