= NGC 644 =

Galaxy in the constellation of Phoenix

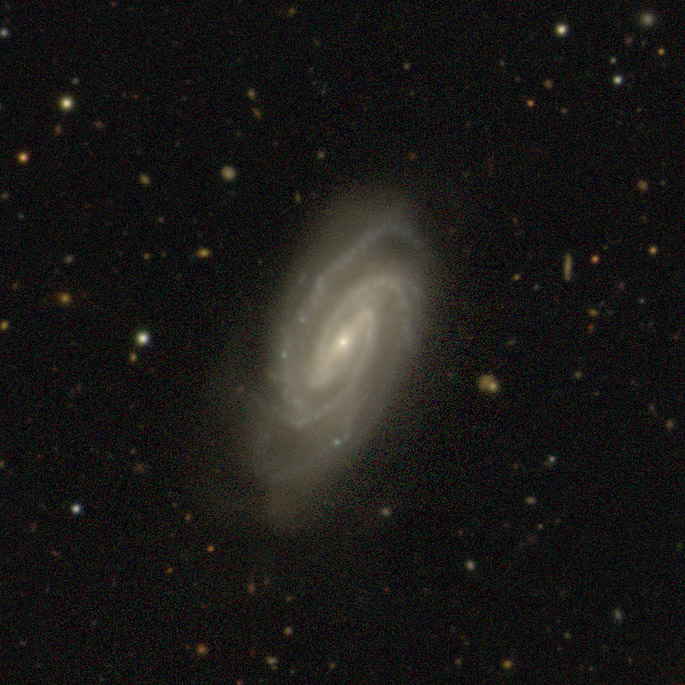
- DECam image of NGC 644

Observation data (J2000 epoch)
- Constellation: Phoenix
- Right ascension: 01^{h} 38^{m} 52.975^{s}
- Declination: −42° 35′ 07.19″
- Redshift: 0.020731
- Heliocentric radial velocity: 6151 km/s
- Distance: 268.8 Mly (82.41 Mpc)
- Apparent magnitude (B): 14.79

Characteristics
- Type: SB(r)bc:
- Size: 126.8 kly (38.88 kpc)

Other designations
- MCG -07-04-027, PGC 6097

NGC 644 is a barred spiral galaxy in the constellation Phoenix in the southern sky. It is estimated to be 270 million light-years from the Milky Way and has a diameter of approximately 130,000 light-years. Together with NGC 641, it probably forms a gravitationally bound pair of galaxies. The object was discovered by British astronomer John Herschel on 5 September 1834.

== Supernovae ==
Two supernovae have been observed in NGC 644:

- SN 2011gm (Type Ia, mag. 15.8) was discovered by Stuart Parker on 21 September 2011.
- SN 2018cmj (Type II, mag. 17.1) was discovered by ASAS-SN on 13 June 2018.

== See also ==
- List of NGC objects (1–1000)
