= NGC 482 =

Galaxy in the constellation Phoenix

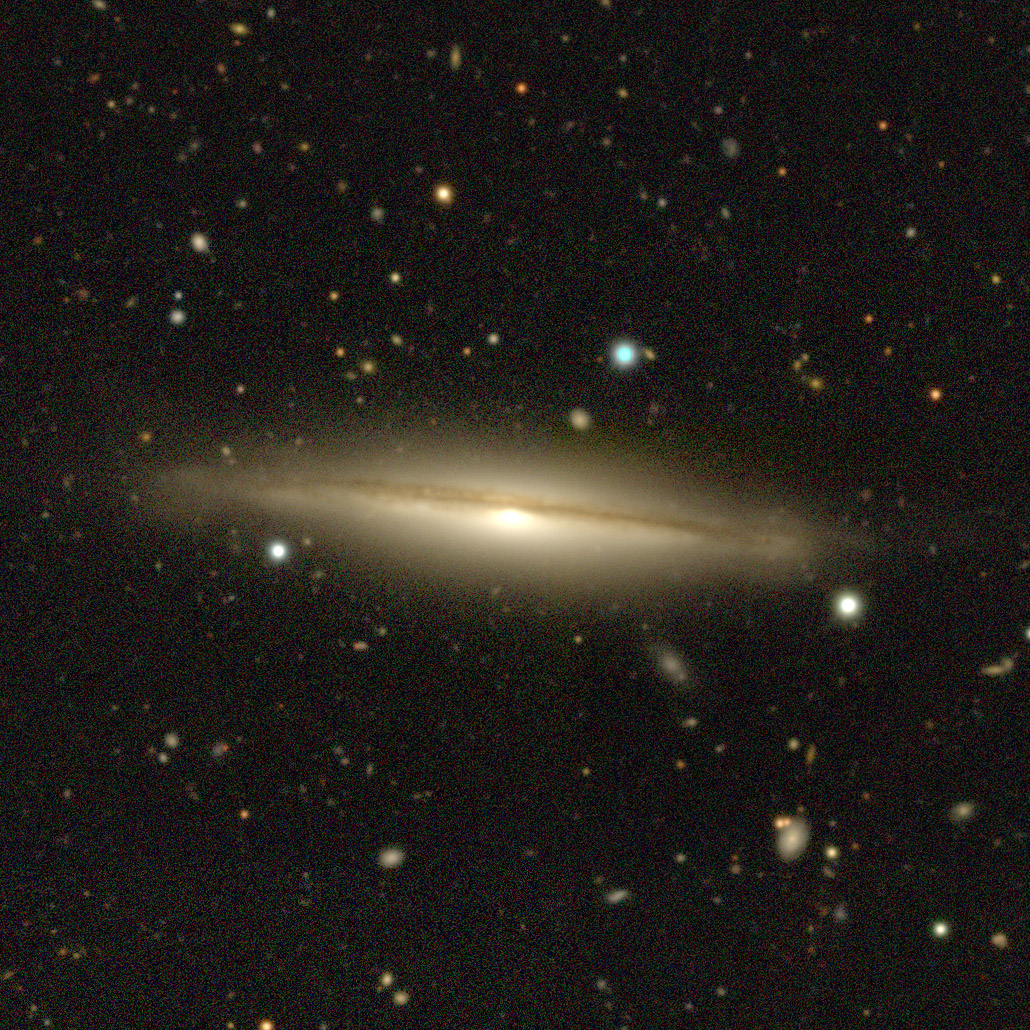
- DECam view of NGC 482

Observation data (J2000 epoch)
- Constellation: Phoenix
- Right ascension: 01^{h} 20^{m} 20.41^{s}
- Declination: −40° 57′ 59.9″
- Redshift: 0.021922 ± 0.000020
- Heliocentric radial velocity: (6500 ± 6) km/s
- Distance: 277 Mly
- Apparent magnitude (V): 13.7

Characteristics
- Type: Sb
- Apparent size (V): 2.2′ × 0.5′

Other designations
- PGC 4823, GC 271, MCG -07-03-017, 2MASS J01202040-4057579, ESO 296-13, SGC 011806-4113.6, h 2405, AM 0118-411

NGC 482 is a spiral galaxy in the constellation Phoenix. It is located approximately 277 million light-years from Earth and was discovered on October 23, 1835 by astronomer John Herschel.

== See also ==
- Spiral galaxy
- List of NGC objects (1–1000)
