= NGC 368 =

Galaxy in the constellation Phoenix

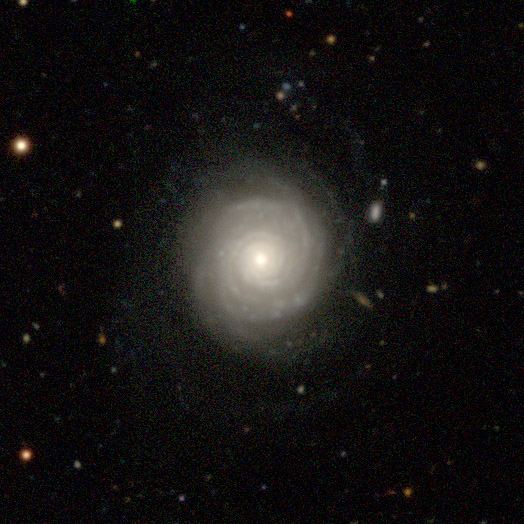
- DECam image of NGC 368

Observation data (J2000 epoch)
- Constellation: Phoenix
- Right ascension: 01^{h} 04^{m} 22.041^{s}
- Declination: −43° 16′ 36.39″
- Redshift: 0.02963
- Heliocentric radial velocity: 8,829 km/s
- Distance: 375 million ly
- Apparent magnitude (V): 13.8

Characteristics
- Type: (R')SAB0/a(rs)
- Apparent size (V): 0.7′ × 0.55′

Other designations
- PGC 3826

NGC 368 is a lenticular galaxy in the constellation of Phoenix. It was discovered by John Herschel on September 5, 1834.
