= NGC 312 =

Elliptical galaxy in the constellation Phoenix

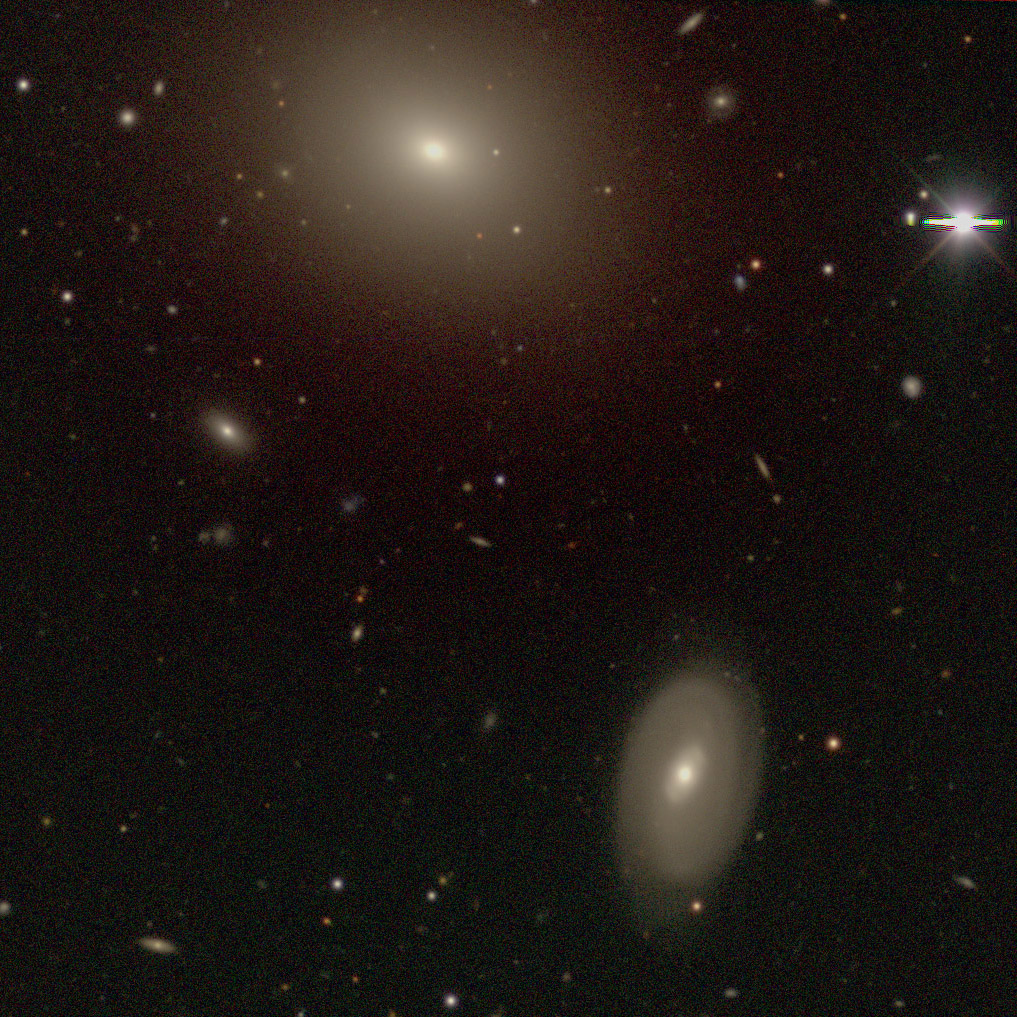
- NGC 312 (top) with DECam. The spiral galaxy at the bottom is ESO 151-5.

Observation data (J2000 epoch)
- Constellation: Phoenix
- Right ascension: 00^{h} 56^{m} 15.9^{s}
- Declination: −52° 46′ 58″
- Redshift: 0.026612
- Heliocentric radial velocity: 7,978 km/s
- Apparent magnitude (V): 13.42

Characteristics
- Type: E2
- Apparent size (V): 1.4' × 1.1'

Other designations
- ESO 151- G 006, 2MASX J00561593-5246576, ESO-LV 1510060, 6dF J0056158-524658, PGC 3343.

NGC 312 is an elliptical galaxy in the constellation Phoenix. It was discovered on September 5, 1836, by John Herschel. NGC 312 is situated south of the celestial equator and, as such, it is more easily visible from the southern hemisphere. Given its B magnitude of 13.4, NGC 312 is visible with the help of a telescope having an aperture of 10 inches (250mm) or more.
