= AZ Phoenicis =

A-type variable star in the constellation Phoenix

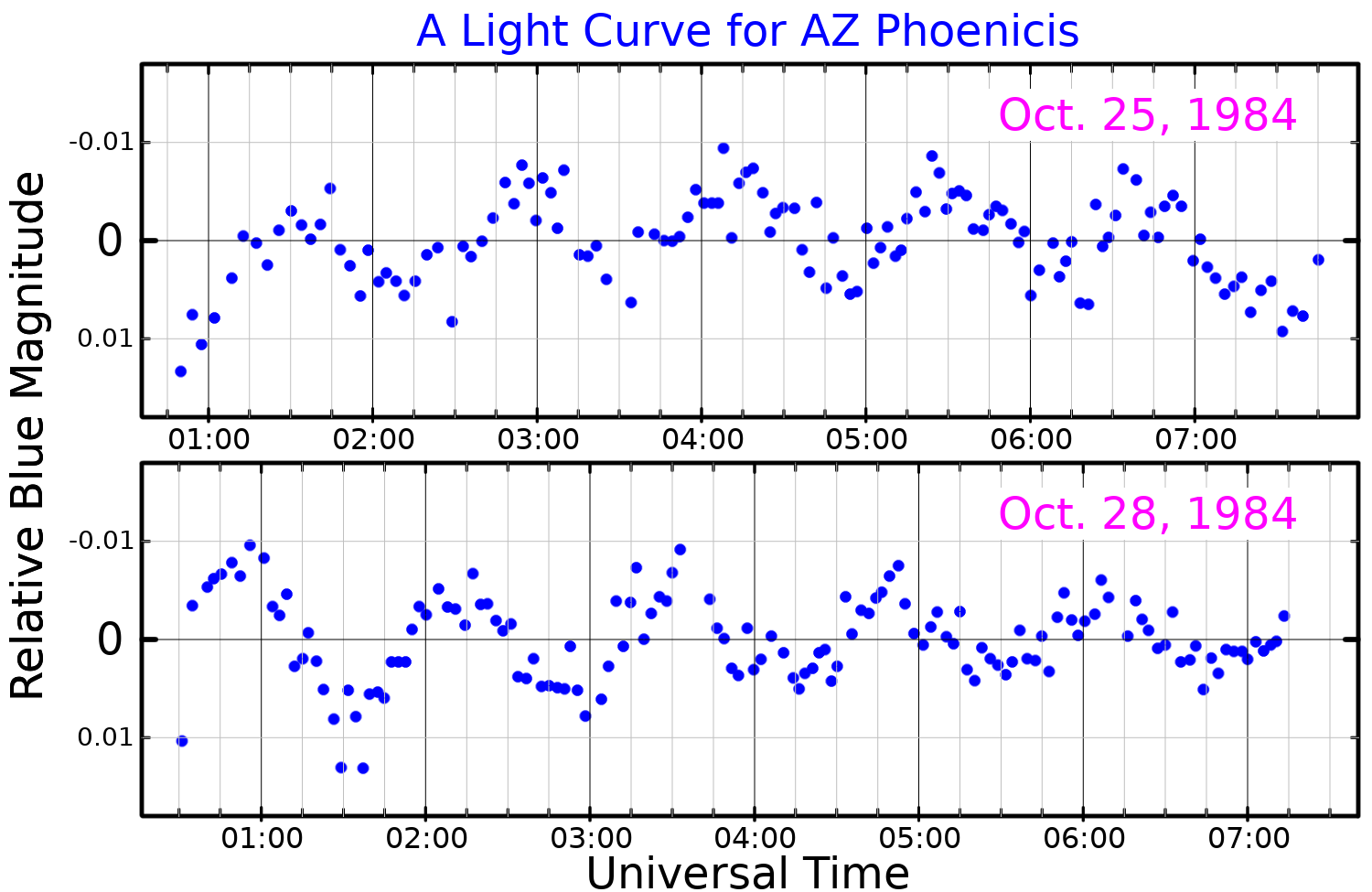
- A blue band light curve for AZ Phoenicis, adapted from Kreidl (1985)

Observation data Epoch J2000 Equinox J2000
- Constellation: Phoenix
- Right ascension: 00^{h} 50^{m} 03.77^{s}
- Declination: −43° 23′ 41.9″
- Apparent magnitude (V): 6.47

Characteristics
- Spectral type: A9/F0III
- Variable type: δ Scuti

Astrometry
Radial velocity (R_{v})	11.9 km/s
Proper motion (μ)	RA: 6.65 mas/yr Dec.: 25.03 mas/yr
Parallax (π)	10.1141±0.0578 mas
Distance	322 ± 2 ly (98.9 ± 0.6 pc)
Absolute magnitude (M_{V})	1.65 ± 0.30

Details
Radius	2.70 R_{☉}
Luminosity	18.6^{+5.9}_{−4.5} L_{☉}
Surface gravity (log g)	3.78 ± 0.08 cgs
Temperature	7,278 ± 34 K
Metallicity	[Z] = +0.52 ± 0.15

Other designations
- AZ Phe, CD−44°216, HD 4849, HIP 3903, HR 239, SAO 215254

Database references
SIMBAD	data

AZ Phoenicis (HR 239) is a variable star in the constellation of Phoenix. It has an average visual apparent magnitude of 6.47, so it is at the limit of naked eye visibility. From parallax measurements by the Gaia spacecraft, it is located at a distance of 322 light-years (99 parsecs) from Earth. Its absolute magnitude is calculated at 1.65.

AZ Phoenicis is a Delta Scuti variable that pulsates with a single period of 79.3 minutes, causing its visual brightness to vary with an amplitude of 0.015 magnitudes. Its variability was discovered by Werner Weiss in 1977, from observations with the 50-cm telescope at La Silla Observatory. AZ Phoenicis has also been classified as a possible Ap star, which remains uncertain, even though the star has a large concentration of metals; the overall metallicity of the star has been measured to about 3 times the solar metallicity.

This star is classified with a spectral type of A9/F0III, corresponding to a giant of type A or F. With an estimated radius of 2.7 times the solar radius, it is shining with 19 times the solar luminosity at an effective temperature of 7,280 K. The astrometric observations by the Hipparcos spacecraft detected a significant acceleration in the proper motion of AZ Phoenicis, indicating it is an astrometric binary.
