= NGC 119 =

Unbarred lenticular galaxy in Phoenix

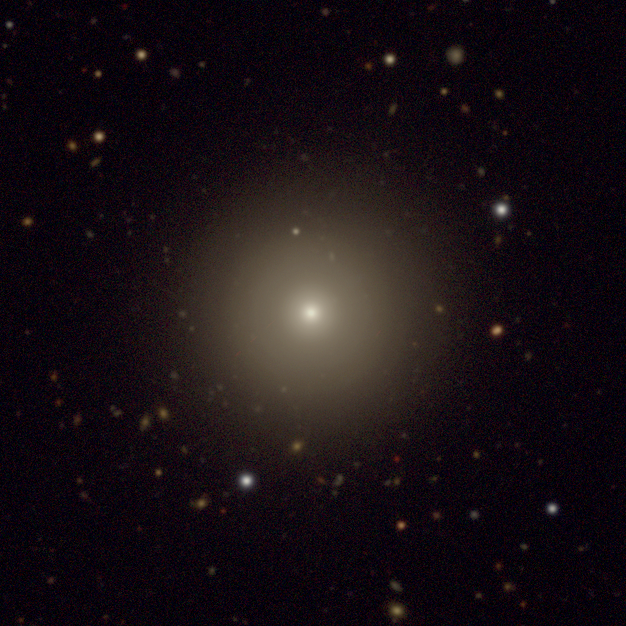
- DECam image of NGC 119

Observation data (J2000 epoch)
- Constellation: Phoenix
- Right ascension: 00^{h} 26^{m} 57.61014^{s}
- Declination: −56° 58′ 41.0368″
- Redshift: 0.024634
- Heliocentric radial velocity: 7294 km/s
- Distance: 329.8 Mly (101.11 Mpc)
- Apparent magnitude (V): 15.70
- Apparent magnitude (B): 14.15

Characteristics
- Type: SA0^{−} pec

Other designations
- PGC 1659

NGC 119 is an unbarred lenticular galaxy with an apparent magnitude of 13.0 located in the constellation Phoenix. It was discovered on October 28, 1834, by the astronomer John Herschel.

== See also ==
- List of NGC objects
