= NGC 238 =

Spiral galaxy in the constellation Phoenix

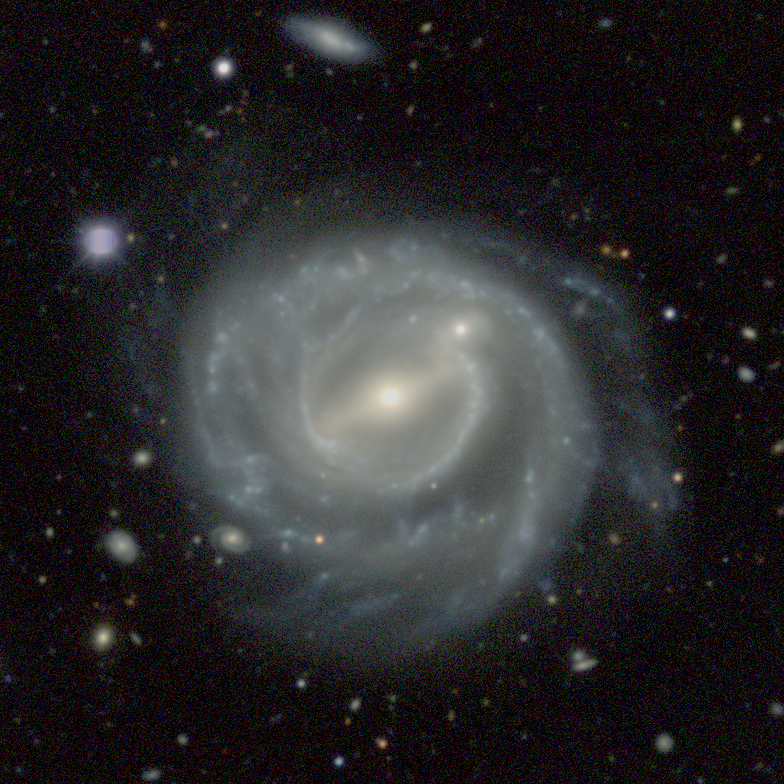
- NGC 238 with DECam

Observation data (J2000 epoch)
- Constellation: Phoenix
- Right ascension: 00^{h} 43^{m} 25.7^{s}
- Declination: −50° 10′ 58″
- Redshift: 0.028706
- Apparent magnitude (V): 13.14

Characteristics
- Type: SB(r)b
- Apparent size (V): 1.9' × 1.6'

Other designations
- ESO 194- G 031, 2MASX J00432575-5010580, ESO-LV 1940310, PGC 2595.

NGC 238 is a spiral galaxy located in the constellation Phoenix. It was discovered on October 2, 1834 by John Herschel.
