= NGC 159 =

Galaxy in the constellation Phoenix

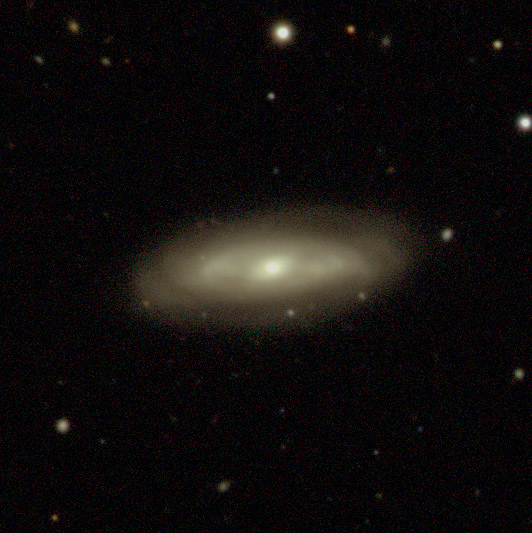
- DECam image of NGC 159

Observation data (J2000 epoch)
- Constellation: Phoenix
- Right ascension: 00^{h} 34^{m} 35.518^{s}
- Declination: −55° 47′ 23.66″
- Redshift: 0.027976
- Heliocentric radial velocity: 8387
- Distance: 376.0 Mly (115.27 Mpc)
- Apparent magnitude (B): 14.86

Characteristics
- Type: (R)SB0/a(r)
- Size: 230,400 ly (70,630 pc) (Note: ESO-LV "Quick Blue" values used.)
- Apparent size (V): 1.29′ × 0.45′

Other designations
- ESO 150-11, PGC 2073

NGC 159 is a barred lenticular galaxy in the constellation Phoenix. The galaxy was discovered on October 28, 1834, by John Frederick William Herschel.
