= NGC 322 =

Lenticular galaxy in the constellation Phoenix

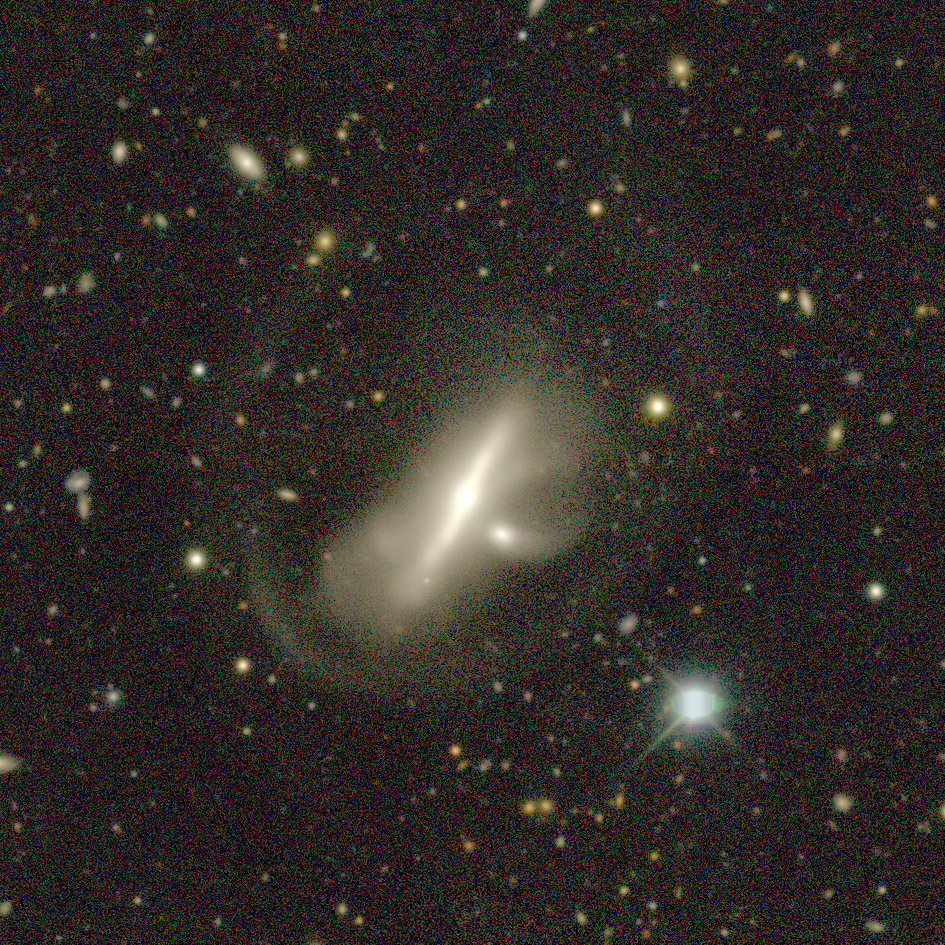
- DECam view of NGC 322

Observation data (J2000 epoch)
- Constellation: Phoenix
- Right ascension: 00^{h} 57^{m} 10.0^{s}
- Declination: −43° 43′ 37″
- Redshift: 0.023770
- Heliocentric radial velocity: 7,126 km/s
- Distance: 318 Mly
- Apparent magnitude (V): 14.25

Characteristics
- Type: S0
- Apparent size (V): 1.1' × 0.6'

Other designations
- ESO 243- G 015, MCG -07-03-003, 2MASX J00570999-4343376, ESO-LV 2430150, 6dF J0057100-434338, PGC 3412.

NGC 322 is a lenticular galaxy located approximately 318 million light-years from the Solar System in the constellation Phoenix. It was discovered on September 5, 1834 by John Herschel. It was described by Dreyer as "very faint, very small, round, a little brighter middle, 3 stars to west." It apparently seems to be interacting with PGC 95427, another galaxy.

From legacy survey images a faint ring or tidal feature can be seen around NGC 322.

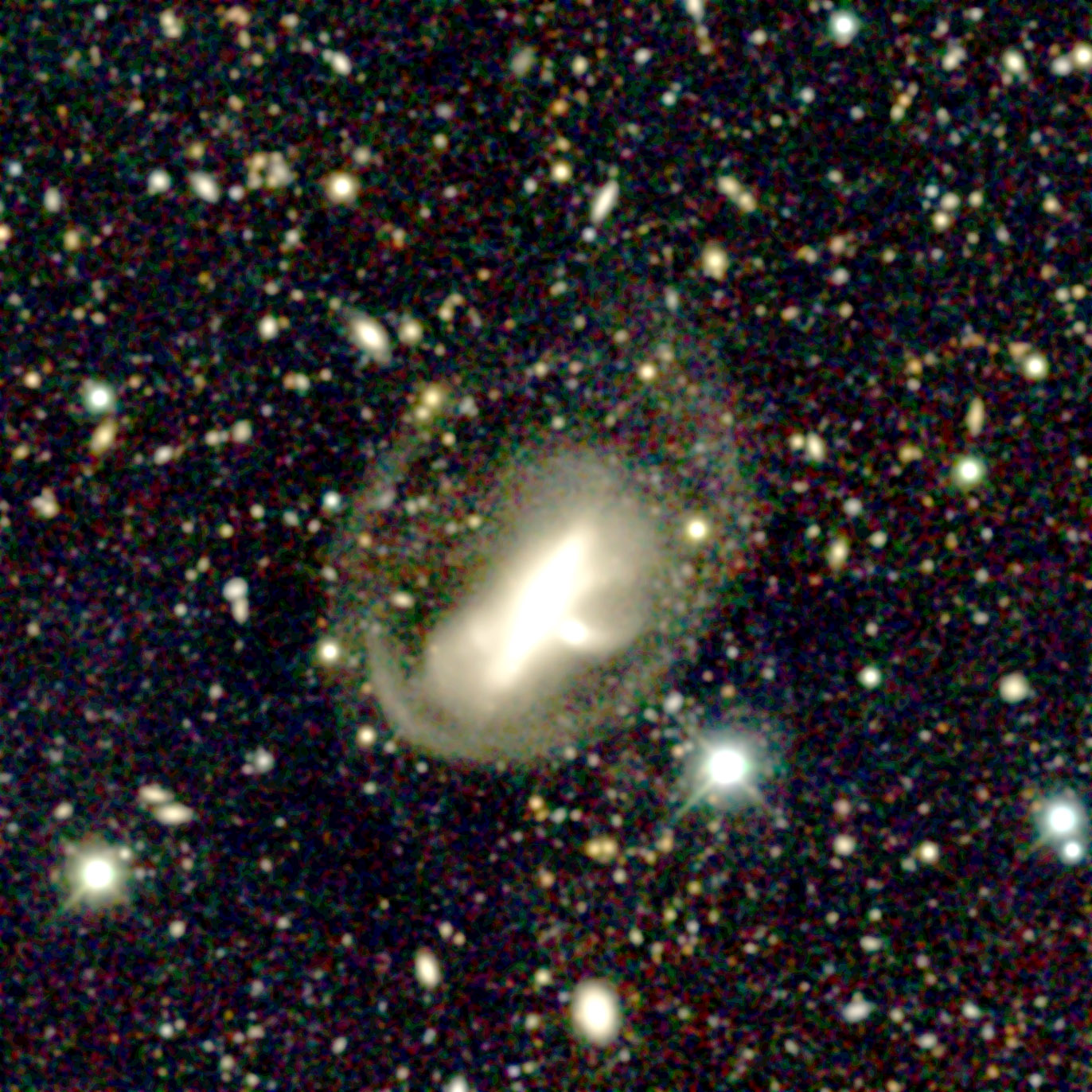
An image processing of the DECam data that makes these faint features of the ring or tidal feature appear.

== Supernova ==
One supernova has been observed in NGC 322:

- SN 2018bwv (Type Ia, mag. 16.2), was discovered by ASAS-SN on 23 May 2018.

== See also ==
- Lenticular galaxy
- List of NGC objects (1–1000)
- Phoenix (constellation)
