= BD Phoenicis =

Variable star in the constellation of Phoenix

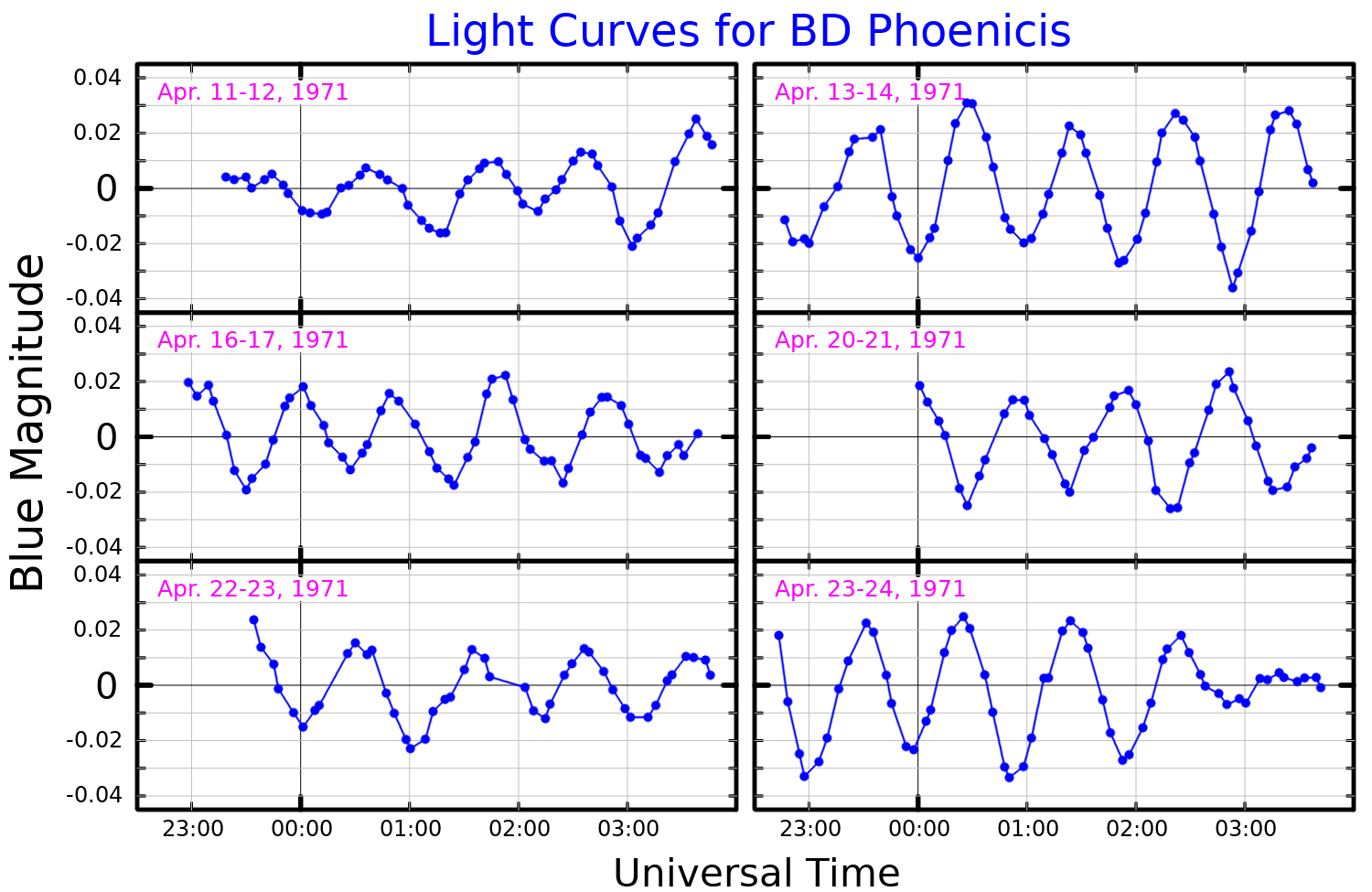
- A blue band light curve for BD Phoenicis, adapted from Koen et al. (2003)

Observation data Epoch J2000 Equinox J2000
- Constellation: Phoenix
- Right ascension: 01^{h} 50^{m} 54.44^{s}
- Declination: −50° 12′ 22.09″
- Apparent magnitude (V): 5.90 – 5.94

Characteristics
- Spectral type: A1Va λ Boo
- Variable type: δ Scuti

Astrometry
Radial velocity (R_{v})	3.0 km/s
Proper motion (μ)	RA: -47.85 mas/yr Dec.: -3.70 mas/yr
Parallax (π)	12.7260±0.0447 mas
Distance	256.3 ± 0.9 ly (78.6 ± 0.3 pc)
Absolute magnitude (M_{V})	1.5 ± 0.1

Details
Mass	2.02 ± 0.04 M_{☉}
Luminosity	20.5 ± 0.34 L_{☉}
Surface gravity (log g)	3.91 ± 0.08 cgs
Temperature	7,818 ± 38 K
Rotational velocity (v sin i)	120 ± 5 km/s
Age	813^{+38}_{−89} Myr

Other designations
- BD Phe, CD−50°514, HD 11413, HIP 8593, HR 541, SAO 232542

Database references
SIMBAD	data

BD Phoenicis is a variable star in the constellation of Phoenix. From parallax measurements by the Gaia spacecraft, it is located at a distance of 256 light-years (78 parsecs) from Earth. Its absolute magnitude is calculated at 1.5.

== Description ==
BD Phoenicis is a Lambda Boötis star, an uncommon type of peculiar stars that have very low abundances of iron-peak elements. In particular, BD Phoenicis has near-solar carbon and oxygen content, but its iron abundance is only 4% of the solar value. BD Phoenicis is also a pulsating variable of Delta Scuti type, varying its apparent magnitude between 5.90 and 5.94. A study of its light curve detected seven pulsation periods that range from 50 to 84 minutes, the strongest one having a period of 57 minutes and an amplitude of 9 milli-magnitudes. Pulsations are common among Lambda Boötis stars and seem to be more common than normal main sequence stars of the same spectral type.

BD Phoenicis is an A-type main-sequence star with a spectral type of A1Va. Stellar evolution models indicate it contains double the solar mass and an age of about 800 million years—having completed 83% of its main sequence lifetime. It is radiating 21 times the Sun's luminosity from its photosphere at an effective temperature of 7800 K. BD Phoenicis has a composite spectra that indicate it is a binary star, but nothing is known about its companion.

Observations by the Herschel Space Observatory have detected an infrared excess from BD Phoenicis, indicating that there is a debris disk in the system. By modeling the emission as a black body, it is estimated that the dust has a temperature of 55±2 K and is at a distance of 118±10 au from the star. The existence of debris disks is possibly related to the Lambda Boötis phenomenon.
