= Delta Phoenicis =

Star in the constellation Phoenix

δ Phoenicis
- Location of δ Phoenicis (circled)

Observation data Epoch J2000 Equinox J2000
- Constellation: Phoenix
- Right ascension: 01^{h} 31^{m} 15.10475^{s}
- Declination: −49° 04′ 21.7308″
- Apparent magnitude (V): 3.93

Characteristics
- Evolutionary stage: Red clump
- Spectral type: G8.5 IIIb
- U−B color index: +0.70
- B−V color index: +0.99

Astrometry
Radial velocity (R_{v})	−7.3±0.7 km/s
Proper motion (μ)	RA: +138.38 mas/yr Dec.: +153.89 mas/yr
Parallax (π)	22.95±0.19 mas
Distance	142 ± 1 ly (43.6 ± 0.4 pc)
Absolute magnitude (M_{V})	0.73

Details
Mass	1.47±0.14 M_{☉}
Radius	10.79±0.54 R_{☉}
Luminosity	54.6±0.6 L_{☉}
Surface gravity (log g)	2.61±0.10 cgs
Temperature	4,790±10 K
Metallicity [Fe/H]	−0.28±0.10 dex
Rotational velocity (v sin i)	< 1.0 km/s
Age	2.33±0.51 Gyr

Other designations
- δ Phe, CD−49°425, CPD−49°198, FK5 1044, GC 1847, HD 9362, HIP 7083, HR 440, SAO 215536

Database references
SIMBAD	data

Delta Phoenicis, Latinized from δ Phoenicis, is a single, yellow-hued star in the southern constellation of Phoenix. With an apparent visual magnitude of 3.93, it is visible to the naked eye. Based upon an annual parallax shift of 22.95 mas as seen from Earth, it is located 142 light years from the Sun. The star is moving closer to the Sun with a radial velocity of −7 km/s.

This is a G-type giant star with a stellar classification of G8.5 IIIb. It is a red clump star, which means it has reached the stage of its evolution where it is generating energy through helium fusion at its core. It is around 2.3 billion years old with 1.47 times the mass of the Sun. The star is radiating 55 times the Sun's luminosity from its enlarged photosphere at an effective temperature of 4,790 K.
