= HD 2039 =

G-type star in the constellation Phoenix

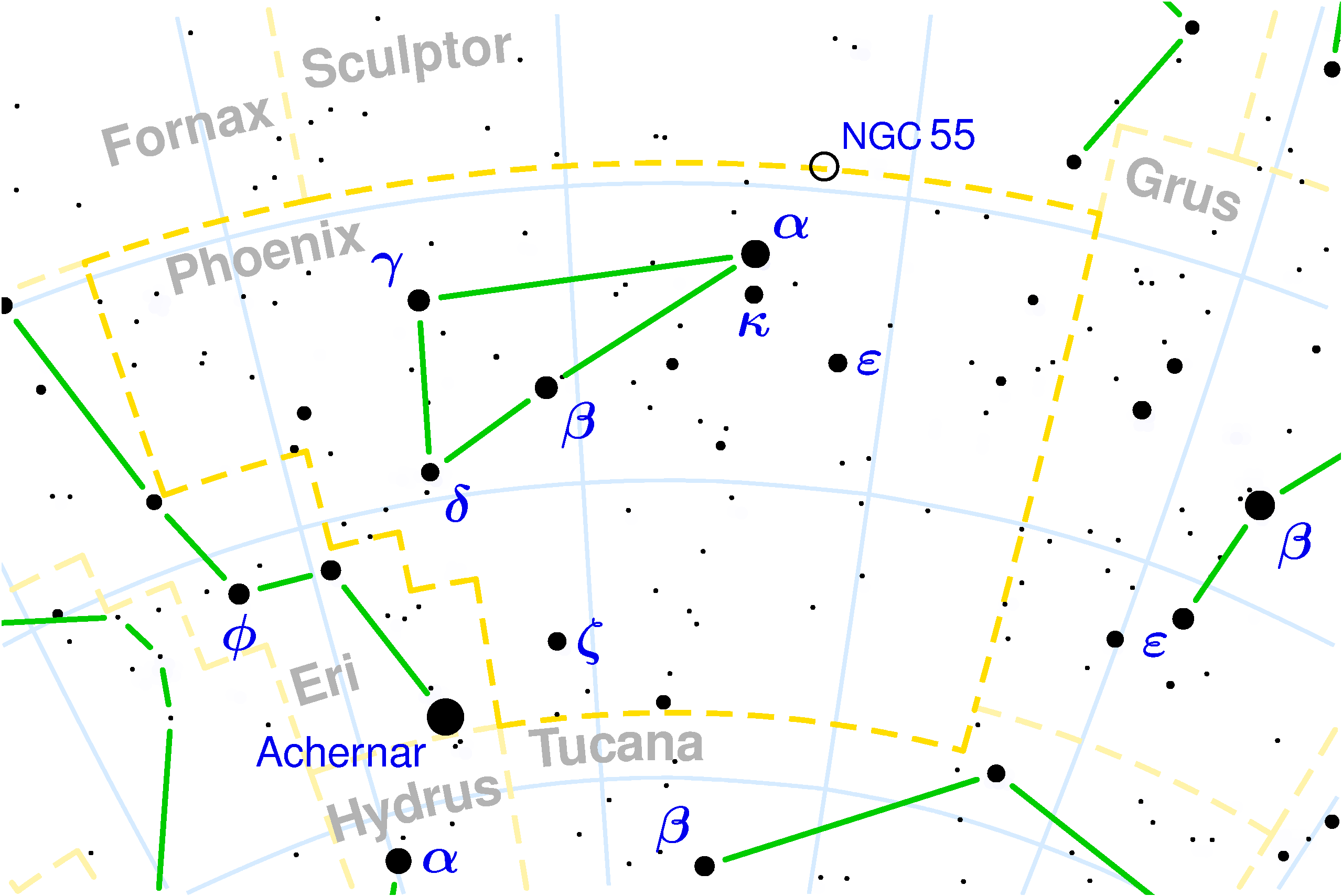
- The Phoenix constellation, where HD 2039 is located

Observation data Epoch J2000.0 Equinox ICRS
- Constellation: Phoenix
- Right ascension: 00^{h} 24^{m} 20.2778^{s}
- Declination: −56° 39′ 00.180″
- Apparent magnitude (V): 8.99

Characteristics
- Evolutionary stage: main sequence
- Spectral type: G2/G3 IV-V

Astrometry
Radial velocity (R_{v})	8.55±0.15 km/s
Proper motion (μ)	RA: +78.658±0.013 mas/yr Dec.: +14.362±0.014 mas/yr
Parallax (π)	11.7661±0.0139 mas
Distance	277.2 ± 0.3 ly (85.0 ± 0.1 pc)
Absolute magnitude (M_{V})	3.96±0.21

Details
Mass	1.2±0.03 M_{☉}
Radius	1.4±0.04 R_{☉}
Luminosity	2.18±0.02 L_{☉}
Surface gravity (log g)	4.22±0.03 cgs
Temperature	5,935±64 K
Metallicity [Fe/H]	0.30±0.03 dex
Age	4.4±0.8 Gyr

Other designations
- CD−57°71, HIP 1931, SAO 232025, 2MASS J00242028-5639001

Database references
SIMBAD	data

HD 2039 is a yellow dwarf or yellow subgiant star in the constellation Phoenix. The star is not visible to the naked eye, and lies 280 light years away from the Sun. HD 2039 is a relatively stable star, and an exoplanet at least three times the mass of the planet Jupiter has been discovered in its orbit; this exoplanet, known as HD 2039 b, was the 100th exoplanet to be discovered.

== Nomenclature ==
The designation HD 2039 from the Henry Draper Catalogue. The catalogue, which was published between 1918 and 1924, was based on the work of Annie Jump Cannon and her team between 1911 and 1915. HD 2039 does not have a common, colloquial name that is characteristic of stars like Sirius, Procyon, and Aldebaran.

== Characteristics ==
HD 2039 is a stable G-type star, meaning it shines with white colour similar to the Sun. HD 2039 has a radius approximately 40 percent larger than the Sun's. The star is slightly hotter than the Sun; while HD 2039 has a temperature of 5,935 K, the Sun's surface temperature lies nearly 200 kelvins lower at 5,778 K. HD 2039 is unusually metal-rich, which has attracted the attention of astrophysicists.

=== Distance and visibility ===
The star's magnitude is 9.0; this signifies that the body is not visible with the naked eye, but can be seen with a telescope. HD 2039 lies 277 light years from the Sun, which is about as far from the Sun as the second brightest star in the night sky, Canopus.

== Planetary system ==
In 2002, a planet was found by the Anglo-Australian Planet Search team to be orbiting the star in a very eccentric orbit. It has a minimum mass more than four times that of Jupiter and has an orbital period of over three years. The planet orbits its star at a distance of approximately two AU away; the planet Earth, in comparison, orbits at a distance of one AU away from the Sun. HD 2039 b's discovery was reported quietly; no press release was provided by the observatory that discovered the star's planet, and no formal announcement of the planet's existence was made. The entity was the 100th exoplanet to have been verified by the scientific community.

The HD 2039 planetary system
Companion (in order from star)	Mass	Semimajor axis (AU)	Orbital period (days)	Eccentricity	Inclination (°)	Radius
b	≥4.5±1.7 M_{J}	2.184±0.006	1,110.1±3.9	0.637±0.011	—	—

== See also ==
- List of extrasolar planets
