= Psi Phoenicis =

Variable red giant

ψ Phoenicis
- Location of ψ Phoenicis (circled)

Observation data Epoch J2000 Equinox ICRS
- Constellation: Phoenix
- Right ascension: 01^{h} 53^{m} 38.74103^{s}
- Declination: −46° 18′ 09.6048″
- Apparent magnitude (V): 4.3 - 4.5

Characteristics
- Evolutionary stage: asymptotic giant branch
- Spectral type: M4III
- U−B color index: +1.71
- B−V color index: +1.59
- Variable type: SR

Astrometry
Radial velocity (R_{v})	+2.90 km/s
Proper motion (μ)	RA: -93.16 mas/yr Dec.: -91.17 mas/yr
Parallax (π)	9.54±0.19 mas
Distance	342 ± 7 ly (105 ± 2 pc)
Absolute magnitude (M_{V})	−0.71

Details
Mass	1.3 ± 0.2 M_{☉}
Radius	86 ± 3 R_{☉}
Luminosity	1050^{+150}_{−140} L_{☉}
Surface gravity (log g)	0.68^{+0.10}_{−0.11} cgs
Temperature	3,586 K
Metallicity [Fe/H]	−1.24 ± 0.39 dex
Rotational velocity (v sin i)	3.9 ± 0.9 km/s
Age	4.9 Gyr

Other designations
- CD−46°552, FK5 67, GC 2303, HIP 8837, HR 555, HD 11695, SAO 215696

Database references
SIMBAD	data

Psi Phoenicis (ψ Phoenicis) is a star in the constellation Phoenix. Its apparent magnitude varies from 4.3 to 4.5 with a period of about 30 days. It is visible to the naked eye. It is approximately 342 light years away based on parallax.

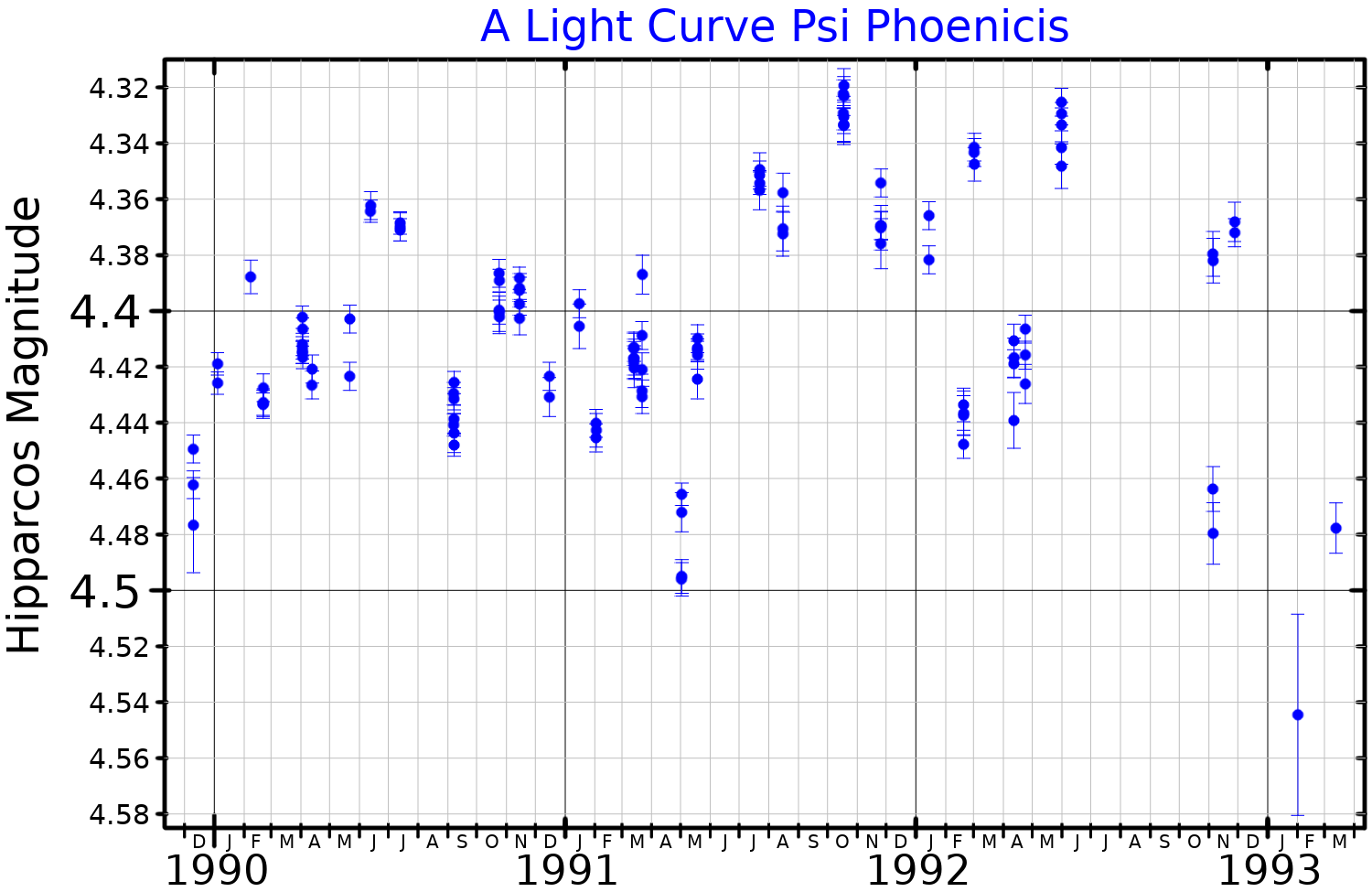
A light curve for Psi Phoenicis, plotted from Hipparcos data

Psi Phoenicis is a red giant in the asymptotic branch with a spectral type of M4III, indicating it is an evolved star in the last evolutionary stage before becoming a white dwarf. In 1973 astronomer Olin J. Eggen discovered it is a variable star, varying in magnitude between 4.3 and 4.5 with an approximate period of 30 days. A more recent study identified two possible periods of 43.7 and 48.1 days, with amplitudes of 0.038 and 0.023 magnitudes. The star is classified as a semiregular variable, of no specific subtype.

In 2001, Psi Phoenicis was observed by the VLT Interferometer with the test instrument VINCI. The observations, in combination with stellar atmospheric models, detected the limb darkening effect on the star's disk and found an angular diameter of 8.13±0.2 mas, corresponding to a stellar radius of 86±3 solar radii. From the radius and estimating an effective temperature of 3,550 K, a luminosity of 1,000 times the solar luminosity was calculated. A 2008 study reanalyzed the interferometric data with a new atmospheric model, finding an angular diameter of 10.15±0.15 mas and a radius of 85±1.6 R_{☉}.

By having directly measured distance, radius and luminosity, Psi Phoenicis was included in a list of 34 well characterized stars to be used as a reference. This program made the first measurement of the metallicity of Psi Phoenicis, showing it is a metal-poor star with only 5% the amount of iron of the Sun ([Fe/H] = −1.24±0.39). This value has a large uncertainty due to the difficulties in modeling the spectra of cool stars, which have strong molecular absorption. The evolutionary state and poorly constrained metallicity result in an uncertain mass of 1.0±0.4 M_{☉}. Assuming a metallicity closer to solar, a mass of 1.3±0.2 M_{☉} is derived.

Psi Phoenicis is considered a single star, and has no known companions. It has been considered a possible spectroscopic binary, including in the Hipparcos Catalogue, which stems from spectroscopic observations in 1919 which showed a possibly variable radial velocity. More recent data, however, showed the velocity to be constant.
