= HD 222095 =

Single A-type main sequence star in the constellation of Phoenix

- Location of HD 222095 (circled)

Observation data Epoch J2000 Equinox ICRS
- Constellation: Phoenix
- Right ascension: 23^{h} 37^{m} 50.99418^{s}
- Declination: −45° 29′ 32.4672″
- Apparent magnitude (V): 4.74

Characteristics
- Evolutionary stage: main sequence
- Spectral type: A1/2V
- U−B color index: +0.09
- B−V color index: +0.08

Astrometry
Radial velocity (R_{v})	+3.40 km/s
Proper motion (μ)	RA: +70.71 mas/yr Dec.: −12.66 mas/yr
Parallax (π)	16.29±0.22 mas
Distance	200 ± 3 ly (61.4 ± 0.8 pc)
Absolute magnitude (M_{V})	0.80

Details
Mass	2.55 M_{☉}
Radius	2.2 R_{☉}
Luminosity	41.42 L_{☉}
Surface gravity (log g)	3.92 cgs
Temperature	9,230 K
Metallicity [Fe/H]	−0.01 dex
Rotational velocity (v sin i)	141 km/s
Age	482 Myr

Other designations
- CD−46°14720, FK5 889, GC 32836, HD 222095, HIP 116602, HR 8959, SAO 231707

Database references
SIMBAD	data

HD 222095 is a single star in the southern constellation of Phoenix, near the western constellation border with Grus. It has a white hue and is visible to the naked eye with an apparent visual magnitude of 4.74. The star is located at a distance of is approximately 200 light years based on parallax, and it is drifting further away with a radial velocity of +3.4 km/s.

This object is an A-type main-sequence star with a stellar classification of A1/2V. It has a high rate of spin with a projected rotational velocity of 141 to 165 km/s, giving it an equatorial bulge that is 6% larger than the polar radius. The star is 482 million years old with 2.55 times the mass of the Sun and around 2.2 times the Sun's radius. It is radiating 41 times the luminosity of the Sun from its photosphere at an effective temperature of 9,230 K. The chemical abundance of the star's outer atmosphere is similar to that in the Sun.
