= HLX-1 =

Intermediate mass black hole candidate located in the lenticular galaxy ESO 24349

Hyper-Luminous Xray source 1
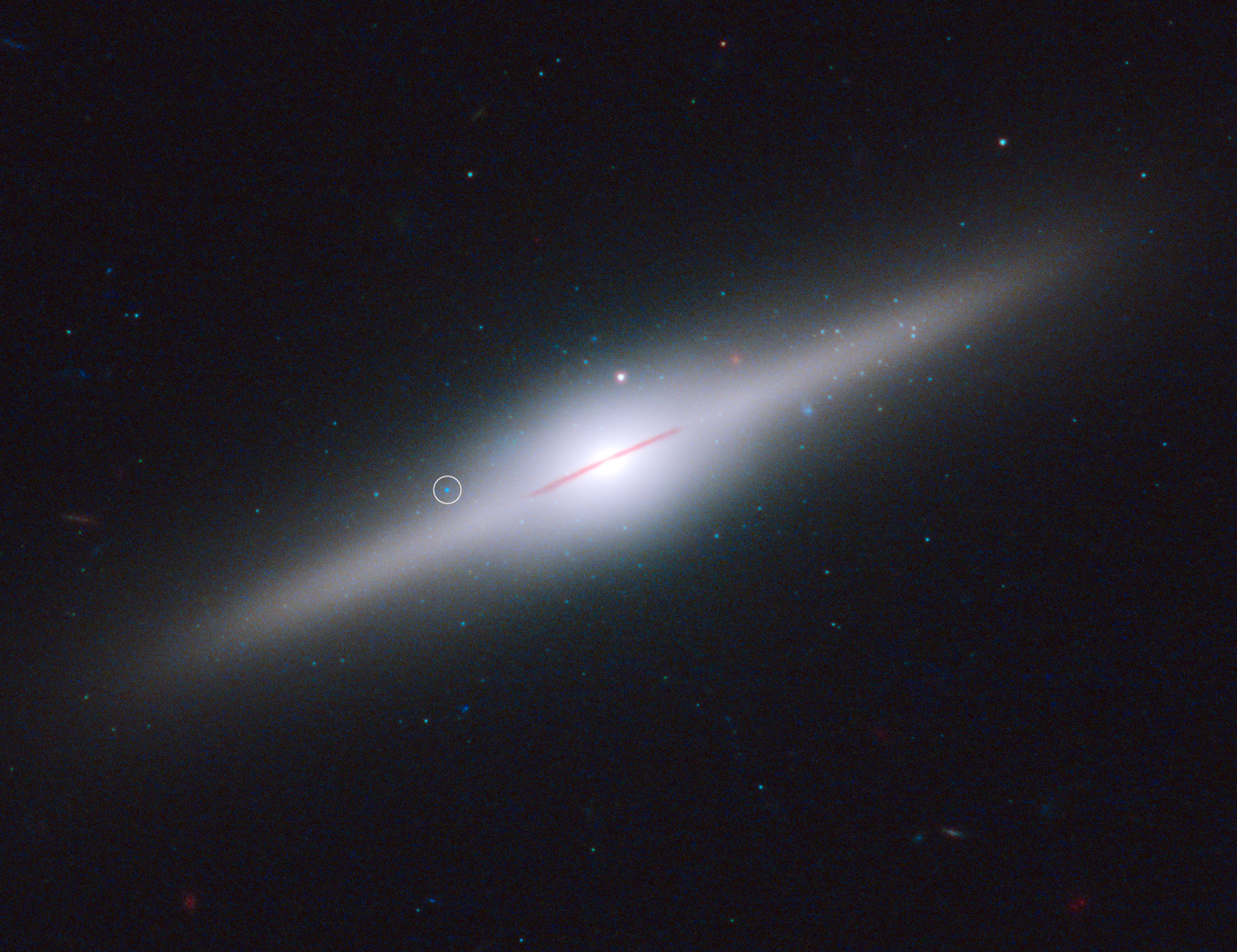
- ESO 243-49 (center) with HLX-1 (circled)

Observation data Epoch J2000 Equinox ICRS
- Constellation: Phoenix
- Right ascension: 01^{h} 10^{m} 28.2^{s}
- Declination: −46° 04′ 22″

Details
Mass	10^{2}–10^{5} M_{☉}

Database references
SIMBAD	data

Hyper-Luminous X-ray source 1, commonly known as HLX-1, is an intermediate-mass black hole candidate located in the lenticular galaxy ESO 243-49 about 290 million light-years from Earth. The mass of its central black hole is estimated to be approximately 20,000 solar masses. The source was discovered at the Institut de Recherche en Astrophysique et Planétologie (IRAP, formerly the CESR), Toulouse, France and gained interest from the scientific community because of strong evidence supporting it as an intermediate-mass black hole. HLX-1 is possibly the remnant of a dwarf galaxy that may have been in a galactic collision with ESO 243–49.

== Discovery ==
The object was first observed in November 2004, in which it was seen as a source emitting X-rays in the outskirts of the spiral galaxy ESO 243-49 and was catalogued as 2XMM J011028.1-460421, but nicknamed "HLX-1". In 2008, a team of astronomers led by Natalie Webb at the Institut de Recherche en Astrophysique et Planétologie in Toulouse, France, discovered HLX-1 and from the very high X-ray luminosity (~1×10^{42} erg/s, 0.2–10.0 keV), as well as its X-ray characteristics, proposed that it was an intermediate mass black hole candidate.

Follow up analysis using further X-ray, optical and radio observations support the intermediate-mass black hole nature. In 2012, further work showed that there was a small cluster of stars amassed around HLX-1, leading Sean Farrell and collaborators to conclude that the black hole was once the galactic center of a dwarf galaxy, which was consumed by ESO 243–49. Farrell remarked, "The fact that there's a very young cluster of stars indicates that the intermediate-mass black hole may have originated as the central black hole in a very low-mass dwarf galaxy. The dwarf galaxy was then swallowed by the more massive galaxy."

== ESO 243-49 ==
ESO 243-49

Observation data (J2000 epoch)
- Right ascension: 01^{h} 10^{m} 27.755^{s}
- Declination: −46° 04′ 27.34″
- Heliocentric radial velocity: 6,782 km/s
- Distance: 376.2 Mly (115.35 Mpc)
- Group or cluster: Abell A2870
- Apparent magnitude (B): 14.92

Characteristics
- Type: S0a
- Apparent size (V): 46.6″ × 14.0″ (NIR)

Other designations
- 2MASX J01102774-4604274, LEDA 4181

ESO 243-49 is a lenticular galaxy in the southern constellation of Phoenix. It is located at a distance of approximately 380 million light-years from the Milky Way galaxy. ESO 243-49 is a member of the Abell 2877 galaxy cluster, which has 89 known members. It lies at a projected separation of about 0.98 Mly (0.3 Mpc) from the dominant central cluster galaxy, IC 1633.

The morphological classification of ESO 243-49 is S0a, indicating this is a lenticular galaxy. It is being viewed edge-on from the perspective of the Earth. An attempt in 2015 to detect radio continuum emission of neutral hydrogen from this galaxy was unsuccessful, suggesting it is a gas poor galaxy compared to similar field galaxies. This may be the result of its gas reservoir being depleted due to its location near the center of a galaxy cluster.

The galaxy has prominent dust lanes around the nucleus, while UV emission from the bulge region suggests star formation is in progress. These may be indications that the galaxy has recently undergone a minor merger event. In contrast, the disk of the galaxy consists of old stars that suggest general star formation was quenched a few billion years after the galaxy formed.
