= Rho Phoenicis =

Variable star in the constellation Phoenix

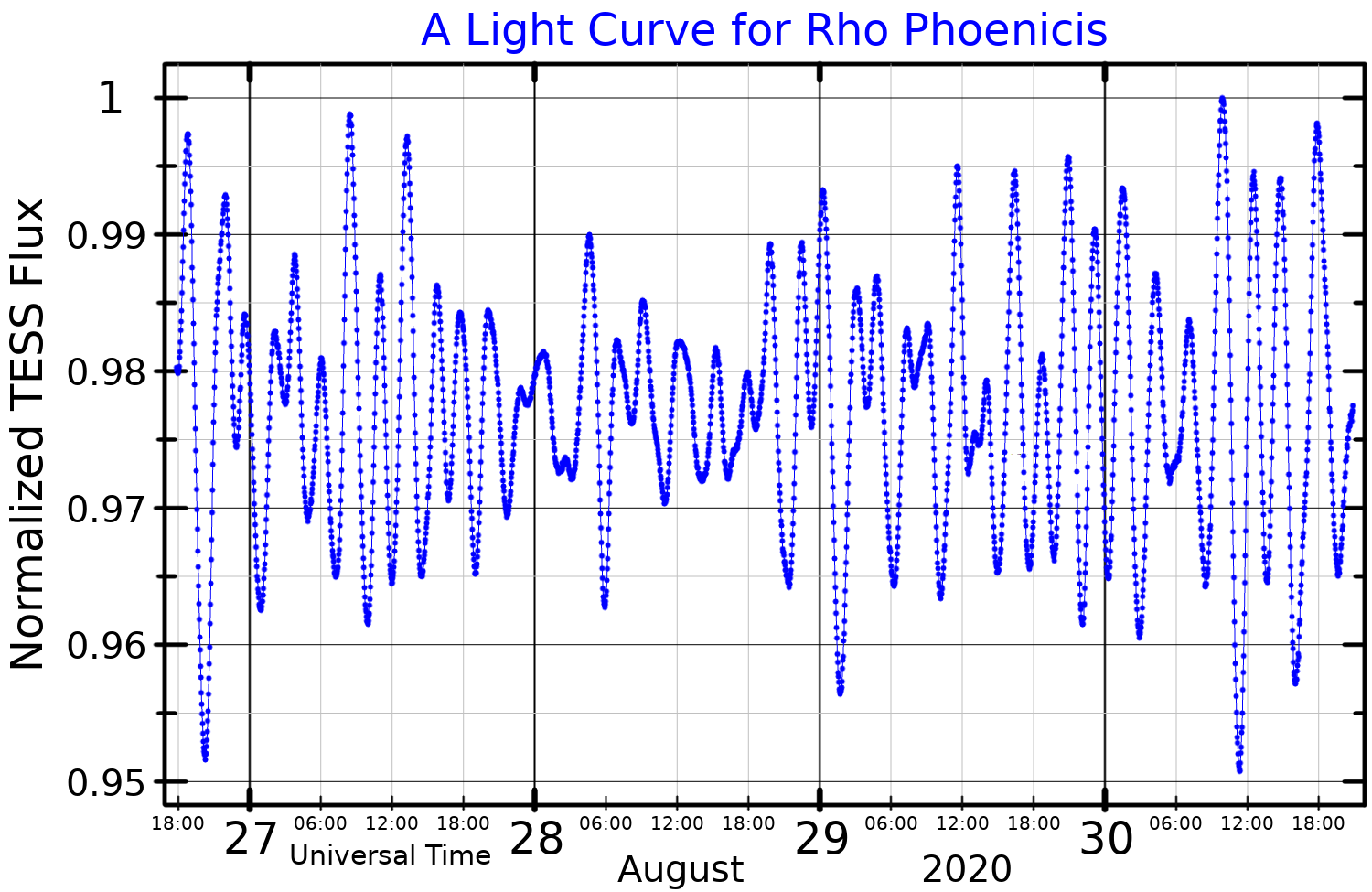
- A light curve for Rho Phoenicis, plotted from TESS data

Observation data Epoch J2000 Equinox ICRS
- Constellation: Phoenix
- Right ascension: 00^{h} 50^{m} 41.186^{s}
- Declination: −50° 59′ 12.54″
- Apparent magnitude (V): 5.17 – 5.27

Characteristics
- Spectral type: F3III
- U−B color index: 0.13
- B−V color index: 0.36
- Variable type: δ Scuti

Astrometry
Radial velocity (R_{v})	22.0 km/s
Proper motion (μ)	RA: 62.919 mas/yr Dec.: 44.139 mas/yr
Parallax (π)	13.3180±0.0629 mas
Distance	245 ± 1 ly (75.1 ± 0.4 pc)
Absolute magnitude (M_{V})	+0.87

Details
Mass	2.13 M_{☉}
Radius	4.2 R_{☉}
Luminosity	36 L_{☉}
Surface gravity (log g)	3.52 cgs
Temperature	6,917 ± 124 K
Metallicity [Fe/H]	−0.10 dex
Age	1.00 Gyr

Other designations
- CD−51°209, FK5 2056, HD 4919, HIP 3949, HR 242, SAO 232203

Database references
SIMBAD	data

Rho Phoenicis (ρ Phoenicis) is a variable star in the constellation of Phoenix. From parallax measurements by the Gaia spacecraft, it is located at a distance of 245 light-years (75 parsecs) from Earth.

This star is classified as an F-type giant with a spectral type of F3III, and in the HR diagram it occupies in the lower part of the instability strip. Rho Phoenicis is Delta Scuti variable, changing its visual apparent magnitude between 5.17 and 5.27 with a period of around 0.1–0.2 days. The pulsation period seems to vary in a timescale of weeks, which indicates the star is not a simple radial pulsator. The analysis of the temperature variations over the pulsation cycles also supports this conclusion. It is not clear if the pulsation period really is variable, or if the light curve is simply the sum of multiple stable pulsation frequencies.

Stellar evolution models indicate that Rho Phoenicis has about 2.1 times the solar mass and an age of around 1 billion years. This star is shining with 36 times the solar luminosity and has an effective temperature of 6,900 K. Its metallicity is high, with an overall metal abundance 25% greater the solar value. Gaia Data Release 2 discovered a star with the same proper motion and parallax as Rho Phoenicis. It has an apparent magnitude of 14.6 (G band) and is at a separation of 7.9 arcseconds.
