= Nu Phoenicis =

Star in the constellation Phoenix

- Location of ν Phoenicis (circled)

Observation data Epoch J2000 Equinox ICRS
- Constellation: Phoenix
- Right ascension: 01^{h} 15^{m} 11.12143^{s}
- Declination: −45° 31′ 53.9926″
- Apparent magnitude (V): 4.95

Characteristics
- Evolutionary stage: main sequence
- Spectral type: F9 V Fe+0.4
- U−B color index: +0.09
- B−V color index: +0.57

Astrometry
Radial velocity (R_{v})	+11.90±0.12 km/s
Proper motion (μ)	RA: +665.086 mas/yr Dec.: +178.070 mas/yr
Parallax (π)	65.5270±0.0704 mas
Distance	49.77 ± 0.05 ly (15.26 ± 0.02 pc)
Absolute magnitude (M_{V})	4.07

Details
Mass	1.15+0.03 −0.04 M_{☉}
Radius	1.26±0.02 R_{☉}
Luminosity	2.00+0.10 −0.09 L_{☉}
Surface gravity (log g)	4.340±0.030 cgs
Temperature	6,116+46 −51 K
Metallicity [Fe/H]	+0.16±0.06 dex
Rotational velocity (v sin i)	3.7±0.5 km/s
Age	3.9+1.7 −0.9 Gyr

Other designations
- CD−46°346, GCTP 257.00, Gl 55, HD 7570, HIP 5862, HR 370, LHS 1220, LTT 696, SAO 215428

Database references
SIMBAD	data

Nu Phoenicis is a star in the southern constellation of Phoenix. It is visible to the naked eye with an apparent visual magnitude of 4.95. This is a solar analogue, meaning its observed properties appear similar to the Sun, although it is somewhat more massive. At a distance of around 49.5 light years, this star is located relatively near the Sun.

Based on observations of excess infrared radiation from this star, it may possess a dust ring that extends outward several AU from an inner edge starting at 10 AU.

== Properties ==
This is an F-type main-sequence star with a spectral type of F9V Fe+0.4, indicating it is similar to the Sun but somewhat hotter and more luminous. The notation 'Fe+0.4' indicates strong iron absorption lines; the star is indeed metal-rich, with an iron abundance 45% greater than the Sun's. Nu Phoenicis has 1.15 times the solar mass and a radius of 1.26 times the solar radius. It is shining with 2.00 times the solar luminosity at an effective temperature of 6,116 K.

Nu Phoenicis has a projected rotational velocity of 3.7 km/s, and a low chromospheric activity index (log R′_{HK} = −4.95). These values indicate that the star is not particularly young and has an age of a few billion years; empirical calibrations estimate from the rotational velocity an age of 2.4 billion years, and from the activity index an age of 5.67 billion years. Similarly, stellar evolution models estimate an age between 1 and 6 billion years, with a more probable value of 4.2 billion years.

Nu Phoenicis has no known companions, and is considered to be a single star. As a bright star similar to the Sun, it has been targeted in a number of studies searching for planets with the radial velocity method, but no detection has been made. High-precision observations with the HARPS spectrograph show that the radial velocity of the star has no significant variability, and is constant to 2.67 m/s, a value similar to the estimated jitter level of 2.48 m/s. The star has also been included in the observations of the Anglo-Australian Planet Search, which did not find Jupiter-analogs with periods up to 6,000 days.

Nu Phoenicis emits a significant amount of infrared excess, in comparison to the expected emission from the star's photosphere, indicating it has a circumstellar debris disk that is warmed by the star and emits thermal radiation. The excess has been detected in long wavelengths, between 30 and 100 μm, indicating relatively cold dust many astronomical units away from the star. Modeling the emission as a black body, the disk has an estimated temperature of 96 K and a radius of 12 AU, contributing to 0.00024% of the system's luminosity.

== See also ==
- List of nearest bright stars
