= Epsilon Phoenicis =

Star in the constellation Phoenix

ε Phoenicis
- Location of ε Phoenicis (circled)

Observation data Epoch J2000 Equinox ICRS
- Constellation: Phoenix
- Right ascension: 00^{h} 09^{m} 24.640^{s}
- Declination: −45° 44′ 50.73″
- Apparent magnitude (V): 3.87

Characteristics
- Evolutionary stage: Red clump
- Spectral type: K0III
- U−B color index: +0.84
- B−V color index: +1.02

Astrometry
| Radial velocity (R_{v}) | −9.20 km/s |
| Proper motion (μ) | RA: +120.393 mas/yr Dec.: −179.597 mas/yr |
| Parallax (π) | 22.6081±0.1481 mas |
| Distance | 144.3 ± 0.9 ly (44.2 ± 0.3 pc) |
| Absolute magnitude (M_{V}) | 0.65 |

Details
| Mass | 1.93±0.23 M_{☉} |
| Radius | 10.03±0.22 R_{☉} |
| Luminosity | 50.4±1.5 L_{☉} |
| Surface gravity (log g) | 2.560±0.103 cgs |
| Temperature | 4,862±42 K |
| Metallicity [Fe/H] | +0.00±0.08 dex |
| Rotational velocity (v sin i) | < 1.5 km/s |

Other designations
- FK5 3, GC 158, HD 496, HIP 765, HR 25, SAO 214983

Database references
| SIMBAD | data |

Epsilon Phoenicis is a star in the southern constellation of Phoenix. It is visible to the naked eye with an apparent visual magnitude of 3.87. The distance to this star is approximately 144 light years based on parallax measurements, but it is drifting closer with a heliocentric radial velocity of −9.2 km/s.

This is an evolved giant star with a stellar classification of K0III, a star that has used up its core hydrogen and has expanded. It is a red clump star, indicating that it has passed the red-giant branch, undergone a helium flash and is currently on the core helium-fusing horizontal branch. Epsilon Phoenicis is about two times more massive than the Sun, and expanded to ten times its radius. It radiates 50 the luminosity of the Sun from its photosphere at an effective temperature of 4,862 K. Based on the elemental abundance of iron in the stellar atmosphere, the metallicity of Epsilon Phoenicis is similar to that of the Sun.
