= Iota Phoenicis =

Star in the constellation Phoenix

- Location of ι Phoenicis (circled)

Observation data Epoch J2000 Equinox ICRS
- Constellation: Phoenix
- Right ascension: 23^{h} 35^{m} 04.57082^{s}
- Declination: −42° 36′ 54.5409″
- Apparent magnitude (V): 4.71 (4.70 - 4.75)

Characteristics
- Evolutionary stage: main sequence
- Spectral type: A2VpSrCrEu
- U−B color index: +0.07
- B−V color index: +0.08
- Variable type: α^{2} CVn

Astrometry
Radial velocity (R_{v})	+19.4 km/s
Proper motion (μ)	RA: +39.908 mas/yr Dec.: + 10.844 mas/yr
Parallax (π)	12.8425±0.3922 mas
Distance	254 ± 8 ly (78 ± 2 pc)
Absolute magnitude (M_{V})	0.28

Details
Mass	2.23 M_{☉}
Radius	5.07+0.51 −0.42 R_{☉}
Luminosity	68.2±3.3 L_{☉}
Surface gravity (log g)	3.89 cgs
Temperature	7,370+320 −350 K
Metallicity [Fe/H]	-0.01 dex
Rotational velocity (v sin i)	23 km/s
Age	573 Myr

Other designations
- ι Phe, CD−43°15420, FK5 1617, HD 221760, HIP 116389, HR 8949, SAO 231675, CCDM J23351-4237A, WDS J23351-4237A

Database references
SIMBAD	data

ι Phoenicis, Latinized as Iota Phoenicis, is a binary star system in the southern constellation of Phoenix, near the constellation border with Grus. It is visible to the naked eye as a faint, white-hued star with an apparent visual magnitude that fluctuates around 4.71. This system lies approximately 254 light years from the Sun based on parallax, and it is drifting further away with a radial velocity of +19.4 km/s.

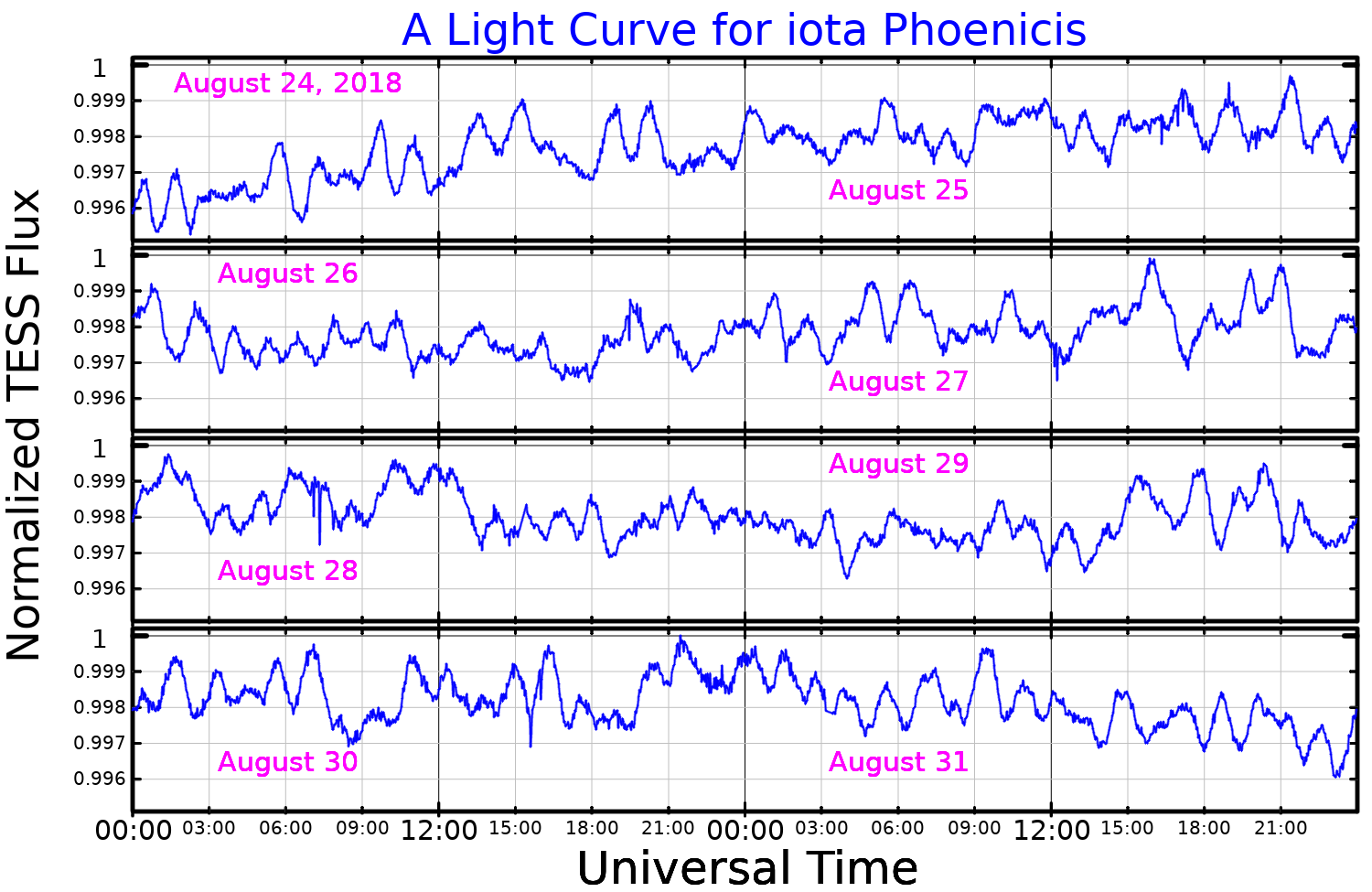
A light curve for Iota Phoenicis, plotted from TESS data,

The primary component is an Ap star on the main sequence with a stellar classification of A2VpSrCrEu, where the suffix notation indicates abnormal abundances of strontium, chromium, and europium in the stellar atmosphere. It is an Alpha^{2} Canum Venaticorum variable; its apparent magnitude varies from 4.70 down to 4.75 with a period of 12.5 days. A rotationally-modulated magnetic field has been measured, varying from −72±9 G to 57±9 G. It has an estimated rotation period of 5.98±0.06 d, although this is in need of further confirmation.

The proper motion companion is a magnitude 12.8 star at an angular separation of 6.7″.
