= HD 2039 b =

Exoplanet in the constellation Phoenix

Discovery
- Discovered by: Tinney, Butler, Marcy
- Discovery date: 2002
- Detection method: Doppler Spectroscopy

Orbital characteristics
- Semi-major axis: 2.19 ± 0.2 AU (328,000,000 ± 30,000,000 km)
- Eccentricity: 0.68 ± 0.15
- Orbital period (sidereal): 1192.582 ± 150 d
- Time of periastron: 2449645.48 ± 150
- Argument of periastron: 223
- Semi-amplitude: 153 ± 22
- Star: HD 2039

HD 2039 b is an extrasolar planet orbiting the star HD 2039. It is almost five times as massive as Jupiter and has a very eccentric orbit.
