= Gamma Phoenicis =

Binary star in the constellation Phoenix

γ Phoenicis
- Location of γ Phoenicis (circled)

Observation data Epoch J2000 Equinox ICRS
- Constellation: Phoenix
- Right ascension: 01^{h} 28^{m} 21.92727^{s}
- Declination: −43° 19′ 05.6502″
- Apparent magnitude (V): 3.41

Characteristics
- Spectral type: M0III
- U−B color index: +1.85
- B−V color index: +1.57
- Variable type: Lb? + β Lyr

Astrometry
Radial velocity (R_{v})	+25.80 km/s
Proper motion (μ)	RA: −18.06 mas/yr Dec.: −208.63 mas/yr
Parallax (π)	13.96±0.34 mas
Distance	234 ± 6 ly (72 ± 2 pc)
Absolute magnitude (M_{V})	−0.86

Orbit
Period (P)	193.9 d
Semi-major axis (a)	0.057 (Note: This is the photocentric semi-major axis, from the motion shown by the observed "star" relative to distant objects, and in practice relative to the barycentre. This is always smaller than the orbital semi-major axis, dramatically smaller when the primary star is much more massive than the secondary or when it is not much brighter.)" (0.30 au)
Eccentricity (e)	0.0301
Inclination (i)	46.3°
Longitude of the node (Ω)	340.2°
Periastron epoch (T)	2453670.987
Argument of periastron (ω) (secondary)	136.8°
Semi-amplitude (K_{1}) (primary)	−15.845 km/s

Details

Primary
Mass	1.3 M_{☉}
Radius	50 – 55 R_{☉}
Luminosity	562 L_{☉}
Temperature	3,802 K

secondary
Mass	0.6 M_{☉}

Other designations
- CPD−43°449, FK5 49, GC 1787, HIP 6867, HR 429, HD 9053, SAO 215516

Database references
SIMBAD	data

Gamma Phoenicis is a star system in the constellation Phoenix, located around 71.63 parsecs (233.6 ly) distant.

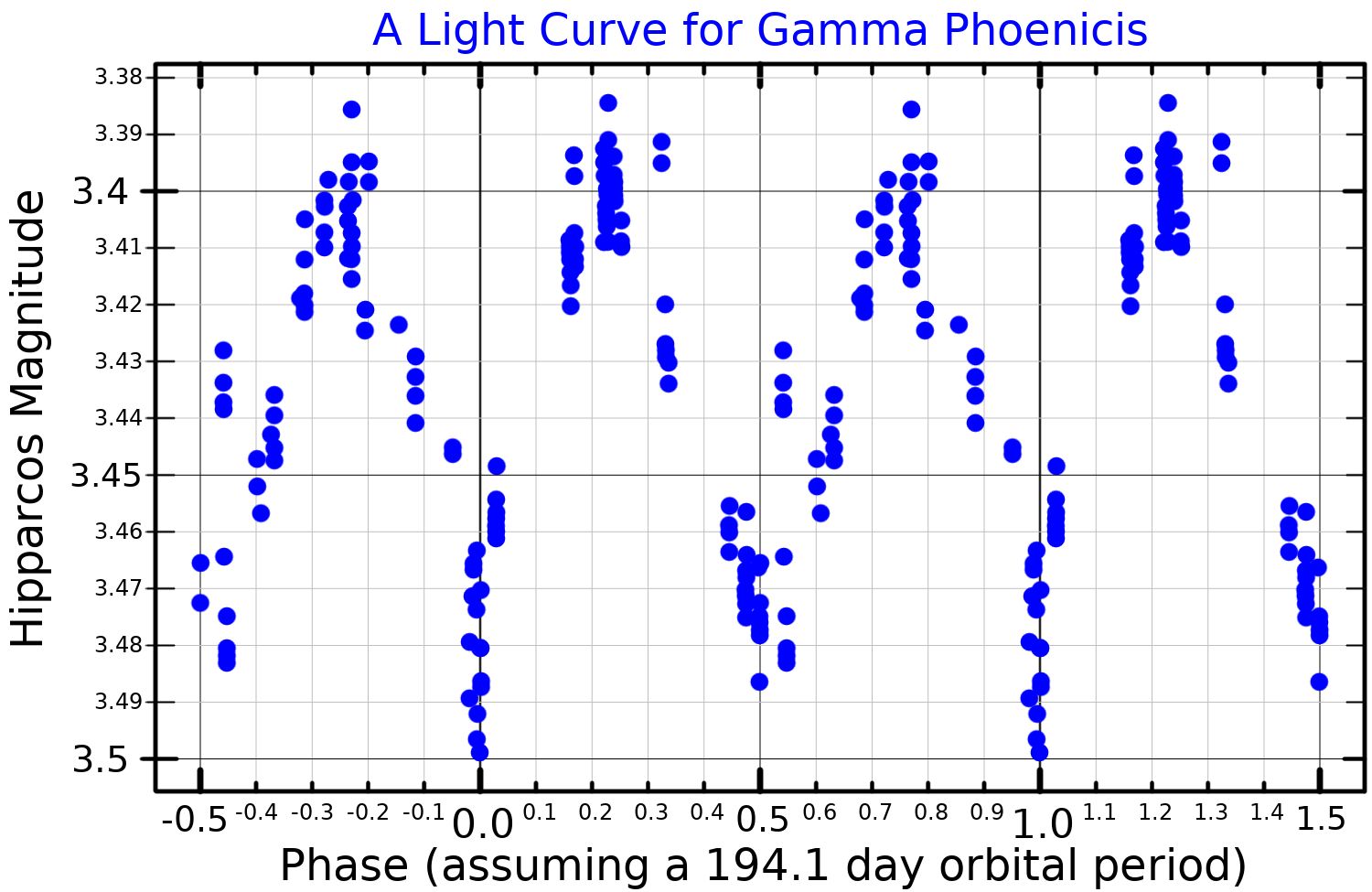
A light curve for Gamma Phoenicis, adapted from Otero (2007)

γ Phoenicis is a spectroscopic binary and a small amplitude variable star. The star system shows regular variations in brightness that were reported as a 97.5 day period in the Hipparcos catalogue, but have since been ascribed to a 194.1-day orbital period with primary and secondary minima. Although the light curve appears to show eclipses, the high orbital inclination suggests the variations are due to ellipsoidal stars as they rotate in their orbit. γ Phoenicis is listed in the General Catalogue of Variable Stars as a possible slow irregular variable with a range from 3.39 to 3.49, the same as reported for the eclipses or ellipsoidal variations.

Only the primary star in the γ Phoenicis system is visible. The second is inferred solely from variations in the radial velocity of the primary star. The primary is a red giant of spectral type M0III, a star that has used up its core hydrogen, then expanded and cooled as it burns a shell of hydrogen around an inert helium core. The two stars are estimated to have masses of 1.3 M_{☉} and 0.6 M_{☉} respectively. The primary is over five hundred times more luminous than the sun. The system shows signs of hot coronal activity, although the primary star is too cool for this. It may originate on the secondary, possibly as material is accreted from the cool giant primary.
