= Kappa Phoenicis =

Star in the constellation Phoenix

- Location of κ Phoenicis (circled)

Observation data Epoch J2000 Equinox J2000
- Constellation: Phoenix
- Right ascension: 00^{h} 26^{m} 12.20183^{s}
- Declination: −43° 40′ 47.3929″
- Apparent magnitude (V): 3.94

Characteristics
- Spectral type: A5IVn
- U−B color index: +0.11
- B−V color index: +0.17

Astrometry
Radial velocity (R_{v})	+11.30 km/s
Proper motion (μ)	RA: +106.20 mas/yr Dec.: +32.15 mas/yr
Parallax (π)	42.00±0.15 mas
Distance	77.7 ± 0.3 ly (23.81 ± 0.09 pc)
Absolute magnitude (M_{V})	2.05

Details
Mass	1.74 M_{☉}
Radius	2.03+0.10 −0.19 R_{☉}
Luminosity	10.7±0.1 L_{☉}
Surface gravity (log g)	4.30 cgs
Temperature	7,320+369 −176 K
Metallicity [Fe/H]	-0.04 dex
Rotational velocity (v sin i)	245.0 km/s
Age	348 Myr

Other designations
- κ Phe, CD−44°101, GC 516, GJ 20, HD 2262, HIP 2072, HR 100, SAO 215092

Database references
SIMBAD	data
ARICNS	data

κ Phoenicis, Latinized as Kappa Phoenicis, is a single star in the southern constellation of Phoenix. It is visible to the naked eye as a white-hued point of light with an apparent visual magnitude of 3.94. The distance to this star is approximately 77.7 light years based on parallax, and it is drifting further away with a radial velocity of +11 km/s. It is a member of the Castor Moving Group of co-moving stars.

This object has a stellar classification of A5IVn, which matches the spectrum of an A-type subgiant star with "nebulous" lines due to rapid rotation. It is 348 million years old and is spinning with a projected rotational velocity of 245 km/s. The star has 1.7 times the mass of the Sun and 2.0 times the Sun's radius. It is radiating 10.7 times the luminosity of the Sun from its photosphere at an effective temperature of 7,320 K. The star displays an infrared excess that matches the signature of a debris disk orbiting 9 AU from the host star with a temperature of 170 K.
