= Mu Phoenicis =

Star in the constellation Phoenix

- Location of μ Phoenicis (circled)

Observation data Epoch J2000 Equinox ICRS
- Constellation: Phoenix
- Right ascension: 00^{h} 41^{m} 19.55229^{s}
- Declination: −46° 05′ 06.0184″
- Apparent magnitude (V): 4.59

Characteristics
- Spectral type: G8III
- U−B color index: +0.72
- B−V color index: +0.97

Astrometry
Radial velocity (R_{v})	+17.41±0.16 km/s
Proper motion (μ)	RA: −28.20 mas/yr Dec.: +1.80 mas/yr
Parallax (π)	13.27±0.23 mas
Distance	246 ± 4 ly (75 ± 1 pc)
Absolute magnitude (M_{V})	0.21

Details
Mass	2.50 M_{☉}
Radius	13.15+2.59 −2.28 R_{☉}
Luminosity	96.6±2.4 L_{☉}
Temperature	4,900 K
Rotational velocity (v sin i)	1.4 km/s
Age	1.4 Gyr

Other designations
- μ Phe, CD−46°180, FK5 1015, GC 823, HD 3919, HIP 3245, HR 180, SAO 215194

Database references
SIMBAD	data

μ Phoenicis, Latinized as Mu Phoenicis, is a suspected astrometric binary star system in the southern constellation of Phoenix. It is visible to the naked eye as a faint, yellow-hued star with an apparent visual magnitude of 4.59. This system is located approximately 246 light years distant from the Sun based on parallax, and is drifting further away with a radial velocity of +17.4 km/s.

The visible component is an aging G-type giant star with a stellar classification of G8III. Having exhausted the supply of hydrogen at its core, this star cooled and expanded off the main sequence. At present it has 13 times the girth of the Sun. It is 1.4 billion years old with 2.5 times the mass of the Sun. It is radiating 97 times the luminosity of the Sun from its swollen photosphere at an effective temperature of 4,900 K.
