= Beta Phoenicis =

Binary star in the constellation Phoenix

- Location of β Phoenicis (circled in red)

Observation data Epoch J2000 Equinox ICRS
- Constellation: Phoenix
- Right ascension: 01^{h} 06^{m} 05.03952^{s}
- Declination: −46° 43′ 06.2785″
- Apparent magnitude (V): 3.30 (4.10 / 4.19)

Characteristics
- Spectral type: G8III + G8III:

Astrometry
Proper motion (μ)	RA: −33.6±2.4 mas/yr Dec.: +15.0±1.6 mas/yr
Parallax (π)	17.93±0.53 mas
Distance	182 ± 5 ly (56 ± 2 pc)
Absolute magnitude (M_{V})	0.29 (0.5 / 0.6)

Orbit
Period (P)	170.7±5.0 yr
Semi-major axis (a)	0.946±0.016″
Eccentricity (e)	0.718±0.016
Inclination (i)	144.0±1.5°
Longitude of the node (Ω)	126.4±3.5°
Periastron epoch (T)	2003.41±0.10
Argument of periastron (ω) (secondary)	293.5±4.4°

Details

β Phe A
Mass	2.7–3 M_{☉}
Radius	14 (Note: Applying the Stefan–Boltzmann law with a nominal solar effective temperature of 5,772 K: $$\sqrt{\biggl(\frac{5,772}{4,950}\biggr)^4 \cdot 100} = 13.6\ R_\odot$$.) R_{☉}
Luminosity	100 L_{☉}
Temperature	4,950 K

β Phe B
Mass	2.7–3 M_{☉}
Radius	14 R_{☉}
Luminosity	100 L_{☉}
Temperature	4,950 K

Other designations
- CD−47 324, HD 6595, HIP 5165, HR 322, SAO 215365.

Database references
SIMBAD	data

Beta Phoenicis (β Phoenicis, β Phe) is a binary star in the constellation Phoenix. Its apparent magnitude is 3.30, meaning that it can be seen with the naked eye (see Bortle scale).

This is a relatively wide visual binary consisting of two G-type red giant stars, both with spectral types of G8III. The two orbit each other every 170.7 years and have a relatively eccentric orbit. The stars are separated by almost one arcsecond. The presence of similar-brightness stars at such separation has made parallax measurements difficult, often with margins of error higher than the standard value, since these measurements assume the star to be single. Based on the typical absolute magnitude of a G-type giant and the apparent magnitude of the stars, the distance has been estimated at 200 light-years. Despite this, a reanalysis of the (uncertain) Hipparcos data, taking in account the binarity of Beta Phoenicis, found a more likely parallax of 17.93±0.53 mas, corresponding to a distance of 182±5 light-years.
