= Lambda1 Phoenicis =

Star in the constellation Phoenix

λ^{1} Phoenicis
- Location of λ^{1} Phoenicis (circled)

Observation data Epoch J2000 Equinox J2000
- Constellation: Phoenix
- Right ascension: 00^{h} 31^{m} 24.98200^{s}
- Declination: −48° 48′ 12.6759″
- Apparent magnitude (V): 4.76

Characteristics
- Spectral type: A0Va
- U−B color index: +0.04
- B−V color index: +0.02

Astrometry
Radial velocity (R_{v})	−2.0±4.2 km/s
Proper motion (μ)	RA: +139.946 mas/yr Dec.: +21.275 mas/yr
Parallax (π)	17.8163±0.2228 mas
Distance	183 ± 2 ly (56.1 ± 0.7 pc)
Absolute magnitude (M_{V})	1.14

Details
Mass	2.26 M_{☉}
Radius	2.24 R_{☉}
Luminosity	33.68 L_{☉}
Surface gravity (log g)	4.17 cgs
Temperature	9,931 K
Metallicity [Fe/H]	0.00 dex
Rotational velocity (v sin i)	111 km/s
Age	224 Myr

Other designations
- λ^{1} Phe, CD−49°115, FK5 15, GC 619, HD 2834, HIP 2472, HR 125, SAO 215131, CCDM J00314-4848A, WDS J00314-4848A

Database references
SIMBAD	data

λ^{1} Phoenicis, Latinized as Lambda^{1} Phoenicis, is a double star in the southern constellation of Phoenix. It is visible to the naked eye as a faint, white-hued point of light with a combined apparent visual magnitude of 4.76. The system is located approximately 183 light years away from the Sun based on parallax. It is a member of the Hyades Supercluster.

The brighter component is an A-type main-sequence star with a stellar classification of A0Va. It may form a binary system of two roughly equal stars. An infrared excess suggests there is a debris disk orbiting 46.3 AU from the star with a mean temperature of 95 K. It has one visual companion at an angular separation of about 30″ and magnitude 13.7.
