= Phoenix (constellation) =

Minor constellation in the southern sky

- Constellation
- List of stars in Phoenix
- Abbreviation: Phe
- Genitive: Phoenicis
- Pronunciation: /ˈfiːnɪks/; genitive /fɪˈnaɪsɪs/
- Symbolism: the Phoenix
- Right ascension: 23^{h} 26.5^{m} –02^{h} 25.0^{m}
- Declination: −39.31°–−57.84°
- Quadrant: SQ1
- Area: 469 sq. deg. (37th)
- Main stars: 4
- Bayer/Flamsteed stars: 25
- Stars brighter than 3.00^{m}: 1
- Stars within 10.00 pc (32.62 ly): 1
- Brightest star: α Phe (Ankaa) (2.40^{m})
- Nearest star: WD 2359−434
- Messier objects: 0
- Meteor showers: Phoenicids
- Bordering constellations: Sculptor; Grus; Tucana; Hydrus (corner); Eridanus; Fornax
- Visible at latitudes between +32° and −90°. Best visible at 21:00 (9 p.m.) during the month of November.

Phoenix is a minor constellation in the southern sky. Named after the mythical phoenix, it was first depicted on a celestial atlas by Johann Bayer in his 1603 Uranometria. The French explorer and astronomer Nicolas Louis de Lacaille charted the brighter stars and gave their Bayer designations in 1756. The constellation stretches from roughly −39° to −57° declination, and from 23.5h to 2.5h of right ascension. The constellations Phoenix, Grus, Pavo and Tucana, are known as the Southern Birds.

The brightest star, Alpha Phoenicis, is named Ankaa, an Arabic word meaning 'the Phoenix'. It is an orange giant of apparent magnitude 2.4. Next is Beta Phoenicis, actually a binary system composed of two yellow giants with a combined apparent magnitude of 3.3. Nu Phoenicis has a dust disk, while the constellation has ten star systems with known planets and the recently discovered galaxy clusters El Gordo and the Phoenix Cluster—located 7.2 and 5.7 billion light years away respectively, two of the largest objects in the visible universe. Phoenix is the radiant of two annual meteor showers: the Phoenicids in December, and the July Phoenicids.

== History ==
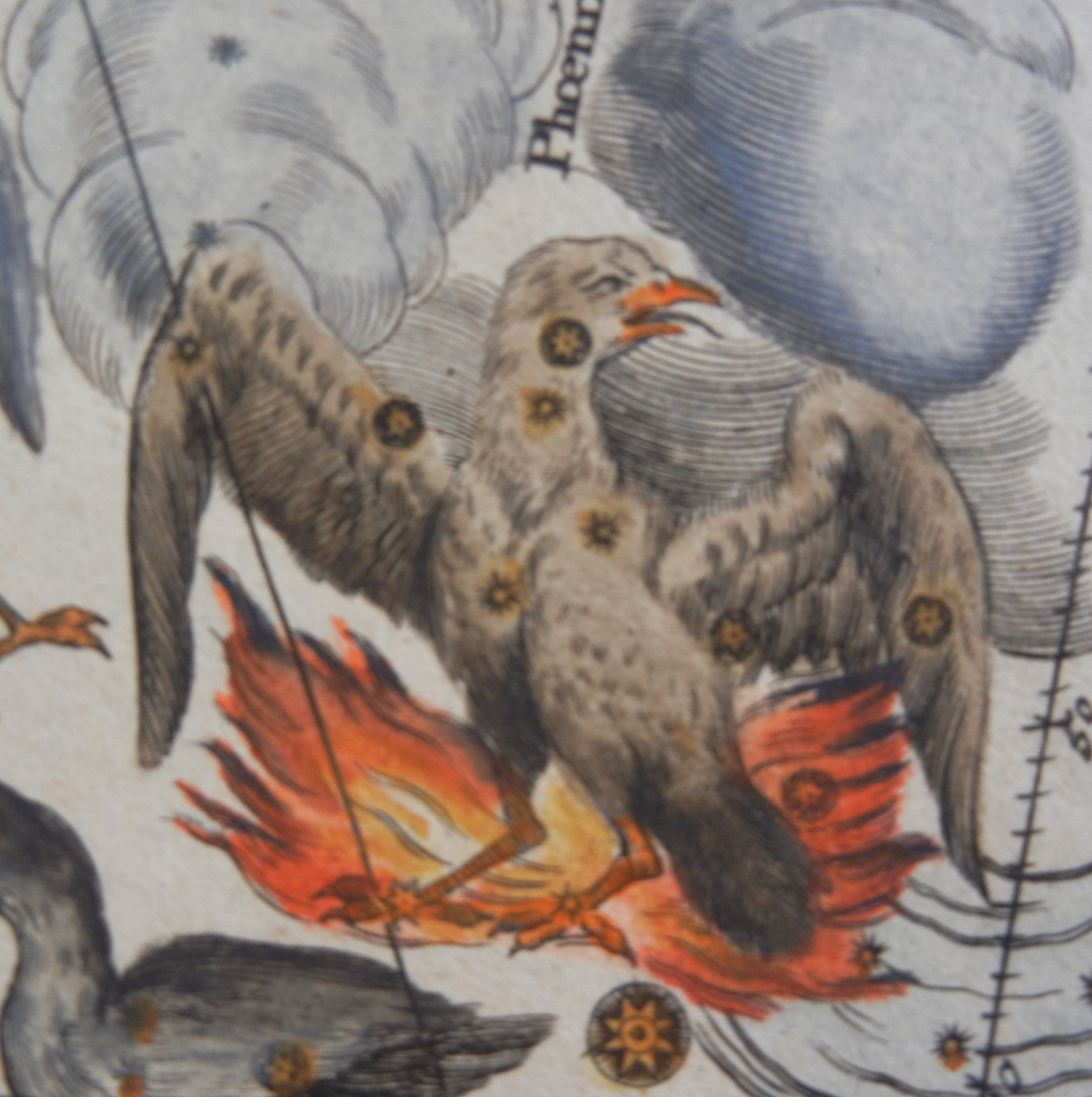
The constellation Phoenix as depicted in Johann Gabriel Doppelmayr's Atlas Coelestis, ca. 1742

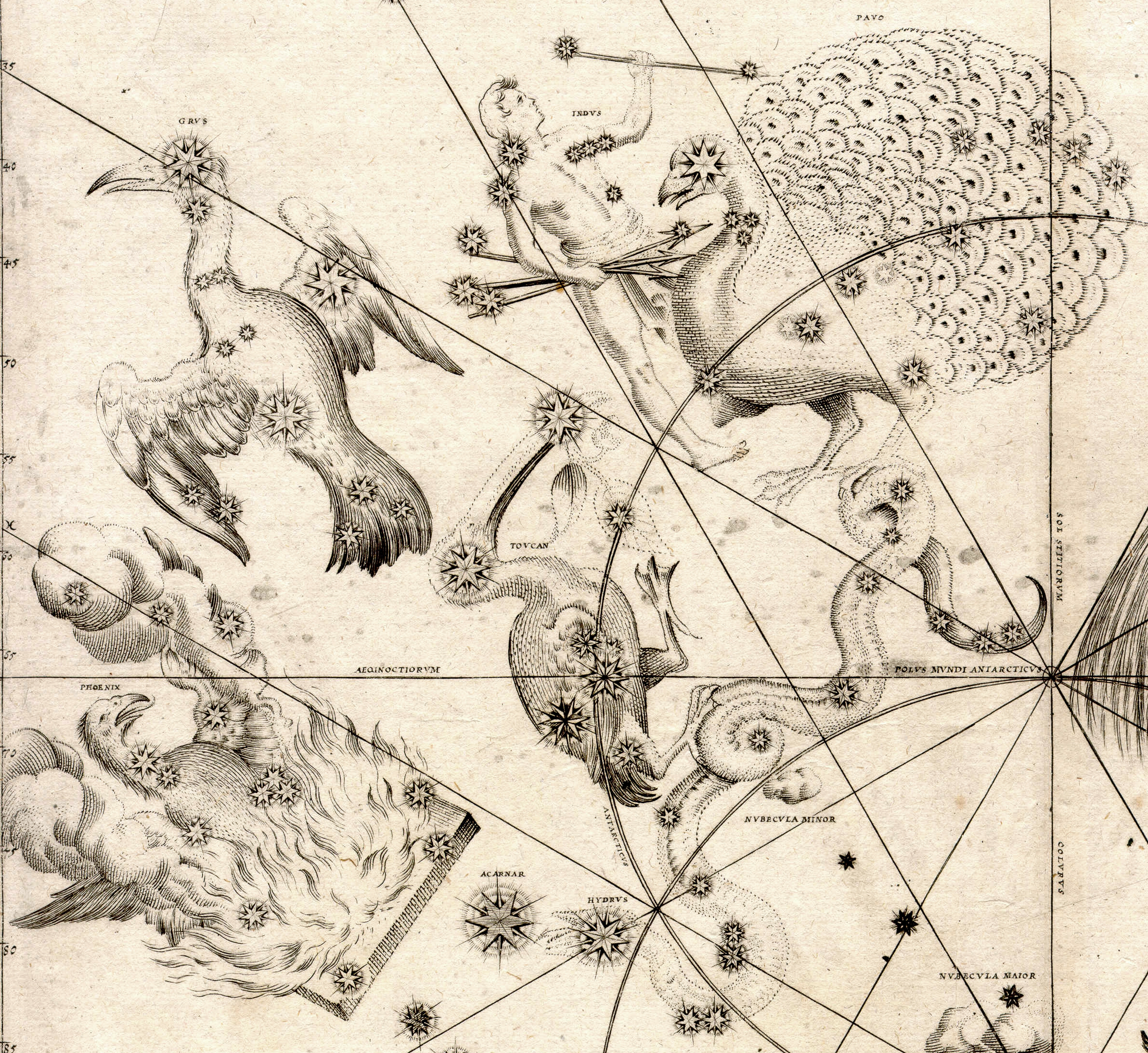
The "southern birds", as depicted in Johann Bayer's Uranometria. Phoenix is on the lower left.

Phoenix was the largest of the 12 constellations established by Petrus Plancius from the observations of Pieter Dirkszoon Keyser and Frederick de Houtman. It first appeared on a 35-cm diameter celestial globe published in 1597 (or 1598) in Amsterdam by Plancius with Jodocus Hondius. The first depiction of this constellation in a celestial atlas was in Johann Bayer's Uranometria of 1603. De Houtman included it in his southern star catalog the same year under the Dutch name Den voghel Fenicx, "The Bird Phoenix", symbolising the phoenix of classical mythology. One name of the brightest star Alpha Phoenicis—Ankaa—is derived from the Arabic: العنقاء, romanized: al-'anqā', lit. 'the phoenix', and was coined sometime after 1800 in relation to the constellation.

Celestial historian Richard Allen noted that unlike the other constellations introduced by Plancius and La Caille, Phoenix has actual precedent in ancient astronomy, as the Arabs saw this formation as representing young ostriches, Al Ri'āl, or as a griffin or eagle. In addition, the same group of stars was sometimes imagined by the Arabs as a boat, Al Zaurak, on the nearby river Eridanus. He observed, "the introduction of a Phoenix into modern astronomy was, in a measure, by adoption rather than by invention."

The Chinese incorporated Phoenix's brightest star, Ankaa (Alpha Phoenicis), and stars from the adjacent constellation Sculptor to depict Bakui, a net for catching birds. Phoenix and the neighbouring constellation of Grus together were seen by Julius Schiller as portraying Aaron the High Priest. These two constellations, along with nearby Pavo and Tucana, are called the Southern Birds.

== Characteristics ==
Phoenix is a small constellation bordered by Fornax and Sculptor to the north, Grus to the west, Tucana to the south, touching on the corner of Hydrus to the south, and Eridanus to the east and southeast. The bright star Achernar is nearby. The three-letter abbreviation for the constellation, as adopted by the International Astronomical Union in 1922, is "Phe". The official constellation boundaries, as set by Belgian astronomer Eugène Delporte in 1930, are defined by a polygon of 10 segments. In the equatorial coordinate system, the right ascension coordinates of these borders lie between 23^{h} 26.5^{m} and 02^{h} 25.0^{m} , while the declination coordinates are between −39.31° and −57.84°. This means it remains below the horizon to anyone living north of the 40th parallel in the Northern Hemisphere, and remains low in the sky for anyone living north of the equator. It is most visible from locations such as Australia and South Africa during late Southern Hemisphere spring. Most of the constellation lies within, and can be located by, forming a triangle of the bright stars Achernar, Fomalhaut and Beta Ceti—Ankaa lies roughly in the centre of this.

== Features ==
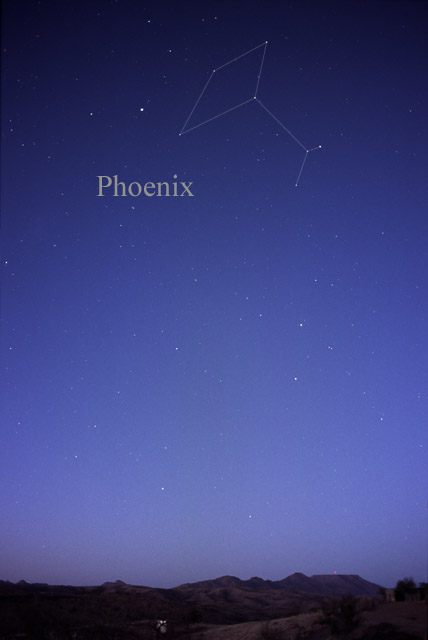
The constellation Phoenix as it can be seen by the naked eye

=== Stars ===
A curved line of stars comprising Alpha, Kappa, Mu, Beta, Nu and Gamma Phoenicis was seen as a boat by the ancient Arabs. French explorer and astronomer Nicolas Louis de Lacaille charted and designated 27 stars with the Bayer designations Alpha through to Omega in 1756. Of these, he labelled two stars close together Lambda, and assigned Omicron, Psi and Omega to three stars, which subsequent astronomers such as Benjamin Gould felt were too dim to warrant their letters. A different star was subsequently labelled Psi Phoenicis, while the other two designations fell out of use.

Ankaa is the brightest star in the constellation. It is an orange giant of apparent visual magnitude 2.37 and spectral type K0.5IIIb, 77 light years distant from Earth and orbited by a secondary object about which little is known. Lying close by Ankaa is Kappa Phoenicis, a main sequence star of spectral type A5IVn and apparent magnitude 3.90. Located centrally in the asterism, Beta Phoenicis is the second brightest star in the constellation and another binary star. Together the stars, both yellow giants of spectral type G8, shine with an apparent magnitude of 3.31, though the components are of individual apparent magnitudes of 4.0 and 4.1 and orbit each other every 168 years. Zeta Phoenicis or Wurren is an Algol-type eclipsing binary, with an apparent magnitude fluctuating between 3.9 and 4.4 with a period of around 1.7 days (40 hours); its dimming results from the component two blue-white B-type stars, which orbit and block out each other from Earth. The two stars are 0.05 AU from each other, while a third star is around 600 AU away from the pair, and has an orbital period exceeding 5000 years. The system is around 300 light years distant. In 1976, researchers Clausen, Gyldenkerne, and Grønbech calculated that a nearby 8th magnitude star is a fourth member of the system.

AI Phe is an eclipsing binary star identified in 1972. Its long mutual eclipses and combination of spectroscopic and astrometric data allows precise measurement of the masses and radii of the stars which is viewed as a potential cross-check on stellar properties and distances independent on Ceiphid Variables and such techniques. The long eclipse events require space-based observations to avoid Solar interference. Gamma Phoenicis is a red giant of spectral type M0IIIa and varies between magnitudes 3.39 and 3.49. It lies 235 light years away. Psi Phoenicis is another red giant, this time of spectral type M4III, and has an apparent magnitude that ranges between 4.3 and 4.5 over a period of around 30 days. Lying 340 light years away, it has around 85 times the diameter, but only 85% of the mass, of the Sun. W Phoenicis is a Mira variable, ranging from magnitude 8.1 to 14.4 over 333.95 days. A red giant, its spectrum ranges between M5e and M6e. Located 6.5 degrees west of Ankaa is SX Phoenicis, a variable star which ranges from magnitude 7.1 to 7.5 over a period of a mere 79 minutes. Its spectral type varies between A2 and F4. It gives its name to a group of stars known as SX Phoenicis variables. Rho and BD Phoenicis are Delta Scuti variables—short period (six hours at most) pulsating stars that have been used as standard candles and as subjects to study astroseismology. Rho is spectral type F2III, and ranges between magnitudes 5.20 and 5.26 over a period of 2.85 hours. BD is of spectral type A1V, and ranges between magnitudes 5.90 and 5.94.

Nu Phoenicis is a yellow-white main sequence star of spectral type F9V and magnitude 4.96. Lying some 49 light years distant, it is around 1.2 times as massive as the Sun, and likely to be surrounded by a disk of dust. It is the closest star in the constellation that is visible with the unaided eye. Gliese 915 is a white dwarf only 26 light years away. It is of magnitude 13.05, too faint to be seen with the naked eye. White dwarfs are extremely dense stars compacted into a volume the size of the Earth. With around 85% of the mass of the Sun, Gliese 915 has a surface gravity of 10^{8.39 ± 0.01} (2.45 · 10^{8}) cm·s^{−2}, or approximately 250,000 of Earth's.

Ten stars have been found to have planets to date, and four planetary systems have been discovered with the SuperWASP project. HD 142 is a yellow giant that has an apparent magnitude of 5.7, and has a planet (HD 142 b) 1.36 times the mass of Jupiter which orbits every 328 days. HD 2039 is a yellow subgiant with an apparent magnitude of 9.0 around 330 light years away which has a planet (HD 2039 b) six times the mass of Jupiter. WASP-18 is a star of magnitude 9.29 which was discovered to have a hot Jupiter-like planet (WASP-18b) taking less than a day to orbit the star. The planet is suspected to be causing WASP-18 to appear older than it really is. WASP-4 and WASP-5 are solar-type yellow stars around 1000 light years distant and of 13th magnitude, each with a single planet larger than Jupiter. WASP-29 is an orange dwarf of spectral type K4V and visual magnitude 11.3, which has a planetary companion of similar size and mass to Saturn. The planet completes an orbit every 3.9 days.

WISE J003231.09-494651.4 and WISE J001505.87-461517.6 are two brown dwarfs discovered by the Wide-field Infrared Survey Explorer, and are 63 and 49 light years away respectively. Initially hypothesised before they were belatedly discovered, brown dwarfs are objects more massive than planets, but which are of insufficient mass for hydrogen fusion characteristic of stars to occur. Many are being found by sky surveys.

Phoenix contains HE0107-5240, possibly one of the oldest stars yet discovered. It has around 1/200,000 the metallicity that the Sun has and hence must have formed very early in the history of the universe. With a visual magnitude of 15.17, it is around 10,000 times dimmer than the faintest stars visible to the naked eye and is 36,000 light years distant.

=== Deep-sky objects ===
The constellation does not lie on the galactic plane of the Milky Way, and there are no prominent star clusters. NGC 625 is a dwarf irregular galaxy of apparent magnitude 11.0 and lying some 12.7 million light years distant. Only 24000 light years in diameter, it is an outlying member of the Sculptor Group. NGC 625 is thought to have been involved in a collision and is experiencing a burst of active star formation. Robert's Quartet (composed of the irregular galaxy NGC 87, and three spiral galaxies NGC 88, NGC 89 and NGC 92) is a group of four galaxies located around 160 million light-years away which are in the process of colliding and merging. They are within a circle of radius of 1.6 arcmin, corresponding to about 75,000 light-years. Located in the galaxy ESO 243-49 is HLX-1, an intermediate-mass black hole—the first one of its kind identified. It is hypothesized to be a remnant of a dwarf galaxy that was absorbed in a collision with ESO 243-49. Before its discovery, this class of black hole was only hypothesized.

Lying within the bounds of the constellation is the gigantic Phoenix Cluster, which is around 7.3 million light years wide and 5.7 billion light years away, making it one of the most massive galaxy clusters. It was first discovered in 2010, and the central galaxy is producing an estimated 740 new stars a year. Larger still is El Gordo, or officially ACT-CL J0102-4915, whose discovery was announced in 2012. Located around 7.2 billion light years away, it is composed of two subclusters in the process of colliding, resulting in the spewing out of hot gas, seen in X-rays and infrared images.

=== Meteor showers ===
Phoenix is the radiant of two annual meteor showers. The Phoenicids, also known as the December Phoenicids, were first observed on 3 December 1887. The shower was particularly intense in December 1956, and is thought related to the breakup of the short-period comet 289P/Blanpain. It peaks around 4–5 December, though is not seen every year. A very minor meteor shower peaks around July 14 with around one meteor an hour, though meteors can be seen anytime from July 3 to 18; this shower is referred to as the July Phoenicids.

== See also ==
- IAU-recognized constellations
- Phoenix (Chinese astronomy)
