= List of stars in Phoenix =

This is the list of stars in the constellation Phoenix.

Name	B	G.	Var	HD	HIP	RA	Dec	vis. mag.	abs. mag.	Dist. (ly)	Sp. class	Notes
α Phe	α	48		2261	2081	00^{h} 26^{m} 16.87^{s}	−42° 18′ 18.4″	2.40	0.52	77	K0III...	Ankaa, Nair al Zaurak, Cymbae, Lucida Cymbae
β Phe	β	85		6595	5165	01^{h} 06^{m} 05.11^{s}	−46° 43′ 06.6″	3.32	−0.60	198	G8IIIvar	
γ Phe	γ	106		9053	6867	01^{h} 28^{m} 21.94^{s}	−43° 19′ 03.8″	3.41	−0.87	234	K5II-III	
ε Phe	ε	39		496	765	00^{h} 09^{m} 24.54^{s}	−45° 44′ 49.2″	3.88	0.71	140	K0III	
κ Phe	κ	46		2262	2072	00^{h} 26^{m} 12.12^{s}	−43° 40′ 47.7″	3.93	2.07	77	A7V	
δ Phe	δ	109		9362	7083	01^{h} 31^{m} 14.98^{s}	−49° 04′ 23.1″	3.93	0.66	147	K0III-IV	
ζ Phe	ζ	89		6882	5348	01^{h} 08^{m} 23.06^{s}	−55° 14′ 45.0″	3.94	−0.73	280	B6V + B0V	Wurren
η Phe	η	68		4150	3405	00^{h} 43^{m} 21.24^{s}	−57° 27′ 47.2″	4.36	0.02	240	A0IV	
ψ Phe	ψ	126		11695	8837	01^{h} 53^{m} 38.82^{s}	−46° 18′ 08.8″	4.39	−0.58	321	M4III SB	semiregular variable, V_{max} = 4.3^{m}, V_{min} = 4.5^{m}, P = 30 d
μ Phe	μ	64		3919	3245	00^{h} 41^{m} 19.58^{s}	−46° 05′ 06.0″	4.59	0.19	247	G8III	
ι Phe	ι	9		221760	116389	23^{h} 35^{m} 04.53^{s}	−42° 36′ 54.4″	4.69	0.07	273	A2V	Alpha2 Canum Venaticorum variable
HD 222095		11		222095	116602	23^{h} 37^{m} 50.94^{s}	−45° 29′ 32.4″	4.74	0.80	200	A2V	
λ^{1} Phe	λ^{1}	54		2834	2472	00^{h} 31^{m} 24.86^{s}	−48° 48′ 12.8″	4.76	1.15	172	A0V	
HD 12055		128		12055	9095	01^{h} 57^{m} 09.99^{s}	−47° 23′ 07.1″	4.82	0.26	267	G8III	
ν Phe	ν	93		7570	5862	01^{h} 15^{m} 10.57^{s}	−45° 31′ 55.5″	4.97	4.08	49	F8V	may have a circumstellar disk
φ Phe	φ	127		11753	8882	01^{h} 54^{m} 22.06^{s}	−42° 29′ 48.8″	5.12	0.24	309	A3V	
π Phe	π	29		224554	118234	23^{h} 58^{m} 55.72^{s}	−52° 44′ 45.4″	5.13	0.65	257	K1III	
χ Phe	χ	130		12524	9459	02^{h} 01^{m} 42.40^{s}	−44° 42′ 48.2″	5.15	−0.14	372	K5III	suspected variable
σ Phe	σ	19		223145	117315	23^{h} 47^{m} 15.99^{s}	−50° 13′ 35.1″	5.18	−1.11	592	B3V	variable star, ΔV = 0.004^{m}, P = 2.97 d
υ Phe	υ	88		6767	5300	01^{h} 07^{m} 47.83^{s}	−41° 29′ 13.0″	5.21	1.29	198	A3V	Double star
ρ Phe	ρ	75		4919	3949	00^{h} 50^{m} 41.13^{s}	−50° 59′ 12.9″	5.24	0.82	250	F2III	δ Sct variable, V_{max} = 5.20^{m}, V_{min} = 5.26^{m}, P = 0.12 d
HD 6245		81		6245	4890	01^{h} 02^{m} 49.19^{s}	−46° 23′ 50.4″	5.39	1.10	235	G8III	
HD 2490		49		2490	2240	00^{h} 28^{m} 26.42^{s}	−39° 54′ 53.6″	5.42	−0.10	415	M0III	
HD 8651		103		8651	6592	01^{h} 24^{m} 40.77^{s}	−41° 29′ 32.9″	5.42	1.03	247	K0III	
HD 10934		120		10934	8240	01^{h} 46^{m} 05.93^{s}	−50° 48′ 58.4″	5.49	−1.10	679	M3III	semiregular variable
λ^{2} Phe	λ^{2}	59		3302	2802	00^{h} 35^{m} 41.13^{s}	−48° 00′ 02.4″	5.51	2.72	118	F6V	
HD 224865		34		224865	107	00^{h} 01^{m} 20.11^{s}	−50° 20′ 14.6″	5.53	−0.64	558	M2III	suspected variable
HD 3158		58		3158	2711	00^{h} 34^{m} 27.62^{s}	−52° 22′ 23.5″	5.57	3.53	84	F3IV-V	
HD 12296		129		12296	9313	01^{h} 59^{m} 38.85^{s}	−42° 01′ 49.0″	5.57	1.06	260	K1III	
HD 2726		53		2726	2383	00^{h} 30^{m} 25.97^{s}	−48° 12′ 52.9″	5.67	2.40	147	F2V	
HD 142		37		142	522	00^{h} 06^{m} 19.0^{s}	−49° 04′ 30″	5.70	3.66	67	G1 IV	has three planets (b, c & d)
τ Phe	τ	33		224834	88	00^{h} 01^{m} 04.60^{s}	−48° 48′ 35.5″	5.71	−0.41	546	G8III	
ξ Phe	ξ	66		3980	3277	00^{h} 41^{m} 46.30^{s}	−56° 30′ 05.2″	5.72	1.64	213	Ap	α² CVn variable, V_{max} = 5.68^{m}, V_{min} = 5.78^{m}, P = 3.95 d
HD 4391		72		4391	3583	00^{h} 45^{m} 45.43^{s}	−47° 33′ 07.8″	5.80	4.93	49	G5IV	
HD 13336		132		13336	10035	02^{h} 09^{m} 09.33^{s}	−43° 30′ 59.3″	5.84	−0.39	574	K1III	
HD 13940		135		13940	10440	02^{h} 14^{m} 31.96^{s}	−41° 10′ 00.1″	5.91	0.86	334	G9III	
HD 4293		70		4293	3521	00^{h} 44^{m} 57.12^{s}	−42° 40′ 34.8″	5.94	1.82	217	A7V	
BD Phe		124	BD	11413	8593	01^{h} 50^{m} 54.48^{s}	−50° 12′ 22.1″	5.94	1.57	244	A1V	δ Sct variable, V_{max} = 5.9^{m}, V_{min} = 5.94^{m}
HD 3750		63		3750	3137	00^{h} 39^{m} 51.91^{s}	−44° 47′ 46.8″	6.00	1.16	303	K1IIICN...	
HD 221323		5		221323	116097	23^{h} 31^{m} 26.92^{s}	−44° 50′ 36.7″	6.02	0.74	371	K0III	
HD 224022		27		224022	117880	23^{h} 54^{m} 38.34^{s}	−40° 18′ 00.5″	6.03	3.80	91	F8IV	
HD 3303		60		3303	2789	00^{h} 35^{m} 33.32^{s}	−54° 49′ 18.3″	6.04	1.59	253	K0IV	
θ Phe	θ	12		222287	116737	23^{h} 39^{m} 27.92^{s}	−46° 38′ 16.4″	6.07	1.42	278	A+...	
HD 222803		16		222803	117075	23^{h} 44^{m} 01.05^{s}	−45° 04′ 59.3″	6.08	1.76	238	G8IV	
ω Phe	ω	80		6192	4829	01^{h} 02^{m} 01.81^{s}	−57° 00′ 08.7″	6.12	0.86	368	G8III	
HD 11332		123		11332	8552	01^{h} 50^{m} 20.08^{s}	−47° 48′ 59.4″	6.14	0.25	490	K1IV	
HD 4304		71		4304	3527	00^{h} 44^{m} 59.72^{s}	−53° 42′ 53.6″	6.15	2.87	148	F7III	
HD 9414		111		9414	7115	01^{h} 31^{m} 39.02^{s}	−45° 34′ 32.6″	6.17	1.22	319	A2V	
HD 15064		139		15064	11231	02^{h} 24^{m} 33.71^{s}	−40° 50′ 26.6″	6.17	3.70	102	G5IV	
HD 2724		51	BB	2724	2388	00^{h} 30^{m} 27.83^{s}	−40° 56′ 22.7″	6.18	0.63	420	F2III	δ Sct variable, ΔV = 0.04^{m}, P = 0.14 d
HD 11022		121		11022	8320	01^{h} 47^{m} 16.69^{s}	−41° 45′ 36.2″	6.18	−0.01	563	K5/M0III	
HD 220802	(χ) (Note: Labelled Chi Gruis (χ Gru/χ Gruis) by Bode in his Uranographia Ioannis Elerte Bode uranographia)	1		220802	115759	23^{h} 27^{m} 09.08^{s}	−50° 09′ 26.2″	6.22	0.26	507	B9V	
AW Phe		108	AW	9184	6952	01^{h} 29^{m} 30.54^{s}	−46° 45′ 23.3″	6.22	−1.14	982	M3III	semiregular variable, ΔV = 0.15^{m}, P = 30.87 d
HD 2529		50		2529	2256	00^{h} 28^{m} 42.98^{s}	−50° 31′ 58.2″	6.26	0.93	380	K0III	
HD 8681		104		8681	6595	01^{h} 24^{m} 41.92^{s}	−44° 31′ 42.7″	6.26	−0.11	613	K1II	
HD 9544		112		9544	7189	01^{h} 32^{m} 36.39^{s}	−49° 43′ 39.1″	6.27	1.74	263	F4V	
HD 224750		31		224750	25	00^{h} 00^{m} 19.05^{s}	−44° 17′ 25.1″	6.28	1.97	237	G3IV	
HD 4737		73		4737	3807	00^{h} 48^{m} 56.74^{s}	−46° 41′ 51.7″	6.28	0.90	388	G8III	
HD 14832		138		14832	11043	02^{h} 22^{m} 11.70^{s}	−43° 11′ 59.7″	6.30	0.64	441	K0III	
HD 469		38		469	730	00^{h} 09^{m} 02.35^{s}	−54° 00′ 07.1″	6.32	0.55	466	G4IV...	
HD 13423		134		13423	10111	02^{h} 10^{m} 04.77^{s}	−43° 48′ 56.0″	6.32	0.92	392	G8III	
HD 223011	(ω) (Note: Labelled Omega Gruis (ω Gru/ω Gruis) by Bode in his Uranographia Ioannis Elerte Bode uranographia)	17		223011	117219	23^{h} 46^{m} 01.18^{s}	−40° 10′ 56.9″	6.32	2.25	213	A7V	
HD 1483		43		1483	1502	00^{h} 18^{m} 42.52^{s}	−43° 14′ 08.1″	6.33	0.99	381	K2III	
HD 14509		137	.	14509	10832	02^{h} 19^{m} 24.76^{s}	−41° 50′ 54.4″	6.36	0.29	534	K2III	
HD 3488		62		3488	2937	00^{h} 37^{m} 18.18^{s}	−54° 23′ 37.7″	6.40	0.58	476	K0II/IIICN	
HD 7082		91		7082	5477	01^{h} 10^{m} 07.38^{s}	−57° 41′ 38.9″	6.41	0.90	413	G6II/III	
HD 9895		114		9895	7443	01^{h} 35^{m} 50.60^{s}	−39° 56′ 49.2″	6.43	3.55	123	F3/F5V	
HD 221051		2		221051	115907	23^{h} 29^{m} 00.80^{s}	−44° 29′ 52.9″	6.43	0.36	533	K2III	
HD 11421		125		11421	8641	01^{h} 51^{m} 26.35^{s}	−39° 50′ 09.2″	6.44	0.74	450	K1IIICN...	
HR 239		74	AZ	4849	3903	00^{h} 50^{m} 03.76^{s}	−43° 23′ 41.8″	6.47	1.56	316	A9/F0III	δ Sct variable, ΔV = 0.015^{m}, P = 0.049 d
HD 224782		32		224782	50	00^{h} 00^{m} 34.29^{s}	−53° 05′ 51.6″	6.49	2.63	193	G1IV	
HD 13387		133		13387	10096	02^{h} 09^{m} 48.43^{s}	−40° 51′ 59.2″	6.49	2.32	222	F3V	
HD 223549		23		223549	117571	23^{h} 50^{m} 35.63^{s}	−47° 22′ 37.3″	6.49	0.87	434	G8III	
HD 13218		131		13218	9951	02^{h} 08^{m} 05.70^{s}	−41° 52′ 49.4″	6.50	1.80	284	A4V	
HD 5388		78		5388	4311	00^{h} 55^{m} 11.89^{s}	−47° 24′ 21.5″	6.8	3.2	174	F6V	has a brown dwarf or stellar companion (b)
HD 10121	ο (Note: This designation was dropped by Benjamin Gould)	116		10121	7610	01^{h} 38^{m} 03.73^{s}	–46° 05′ 01.7″	6.97		593	K2IIICNIa/b	
SX Phe		18	SX	223065	117254	23^{h} 46^{m} 32.89^{s}	−41° 34′ 54.8″	7.12		254.7	A2V	prototype SX Phe variable (double-mode), V_{max} = 6.76^{m}, V_{min} = 7.53^{m}, P = 0.055 d
HD 6434				6434	5054	01^{h} 04^{m} 40.1511^{s}	−39° 29′ 17.6″	7.72	4.69	131	G2/G3V	Nenque; has a planet (b)
HD 8535				8535	6511	01^{h} 23^{m} 37.24^{s}	−41° 16′ 11.3″	7.72	3.97	184	G0V	has a planet (b)
HD 13724				13724	10278	02^{h} 12^{m} 21.0^{s}	−46° 48′ 59″	7.90		142	G3/5V	has a brown dwarf (b)
AE Phe			AE	9528	7183	01^{h} 32^{m} 32.93^{s}	−49° 31′ 41.3″	8.15		165.1	G4V	W UMa variable, V_{max} = 7.56^{m}, V_{min} = 8.25^{m}, P = 0.36 d
AI Phe			AI	6980	5438	01^{h} 09^{m} 34.19^{s}	−46° 15′ 56.1″	8.60		931	G3V	Algol variable, V_{max} = 8.58^{m}, V_{min} = 9.35^{m}, P = 24.59 d
HD 2039				2039	1931	00^{h} 24^{m} 20.28^{s}	−56° 39′ 00.2″	9.01	4.24	293	G2/G3IV/V	has a planet (b)
WASP-18				10069	7562	01^{h} 37^{m} 25.03^{s}	−45° 40′ 40.389″	9.30	4.18	344	F9	has a transiting planet (b)
AD Phe			AD		5955	01^{h} 16^{m} 38.07^{s}	−39° 42′ 31.3″	10.47		475		W UMa variable, V_{max} = 10.27^{m}, V_{min} = 10.8^{m}, P = 0.38 d
HIP 65A					65	00^{h} 00^{m} 45.0^{s}	−54° 49′ 51″	11.1		202	K4V	has a planet (b)
WASP-29						23^{h} 51^{m} 31^{s}	−39° 54′ 24″	11.3		261	K4V	has a transiting planet (b)
WASP-105						01^{h} 36^{m} 40.0^{s}	−50° 39′ 32″	12.10			K2	has a transiting planet (b)
RV Phe			RV		115870	23^{h} 28^{m} 31.45^{s}	−47° 27′ 13.1″	12.16		14000	F6:	RR Lyr variable, V_{max} = 11.551^{m}, V_{min} = 12.244^{m}, P = 0.60 d
WASP-96						00^{h} 04^{m} 11.0^{s}	−47° 21′ 38″	12.2			G8	has a transiting planet (b)
WASP-5						23^{h} 57^{m} 23.76^{s}	−41° 16′ 37.7″	12.26	4.90	968	G4V	has a transiting planet (b)
WASP-4						23^{h} 34^{m} 15.06^{s}	−42° 03′ 41.1″	12.6	5.21	979	G7V	has a transiting planet (b)
YZ Phe			YZ			01^{h} 42^{m} 25.85^{s}	−45° 57′ 03.9″	12.70			K3V	W UMa variable, V_{max} = 12.70^{m}, V_{min} = 13.20^{m}, P = 0.23 d
WD 2359-434						00^{h} 02^{m} 10.77^{s}	−43° 09′ 56.02″	13.05		26.662	DAP5.8	white dwarf
HE0107-5240						01^{h} 09^{m} 29.10^{s}	−52° 24′ 34.0″	15.17				one of the most metal-poor and oldest stars known
BPM 30551			AX			01^{h} 06^{m} 53.64^{s}	−46° 08′ 53.7″	15.42			DA4.4	ZZ Cet variable, V_{max} = 15.26^{m}, V_{min} = 15.42^{m}
Table legend: • Name = Proper name • B = Bayer designation • F or/and G. = Flamsteed designation or Gould designation • Var = Variable-star designation • HD = Henry Draper Catalogue designation number • HIP = Hipparcos Catalogue designation number • RA = Right ascension for the Epoch/Equinox J2000.0 • Dec = Declination for the Epoch/Equinox J2000.0 • vis. mag. = visual magnitude (m or m_{v}), also known as apparent magnitude • abs. mag. = absolute magnitude (M_{v}) • Dist. (ly) = Distance in light-years from Earth • Sp. class = Spectral class of the star in the stellar classification system • Notes = Common name(s) or alternate name(s); comments; notable properties [for example: multiple star status, range of variability if it is a variable star, exoplanets, etc.]

== See also ==
- List of stars by constellation
