= BV Centauri =

Star in the constellation Centaurus

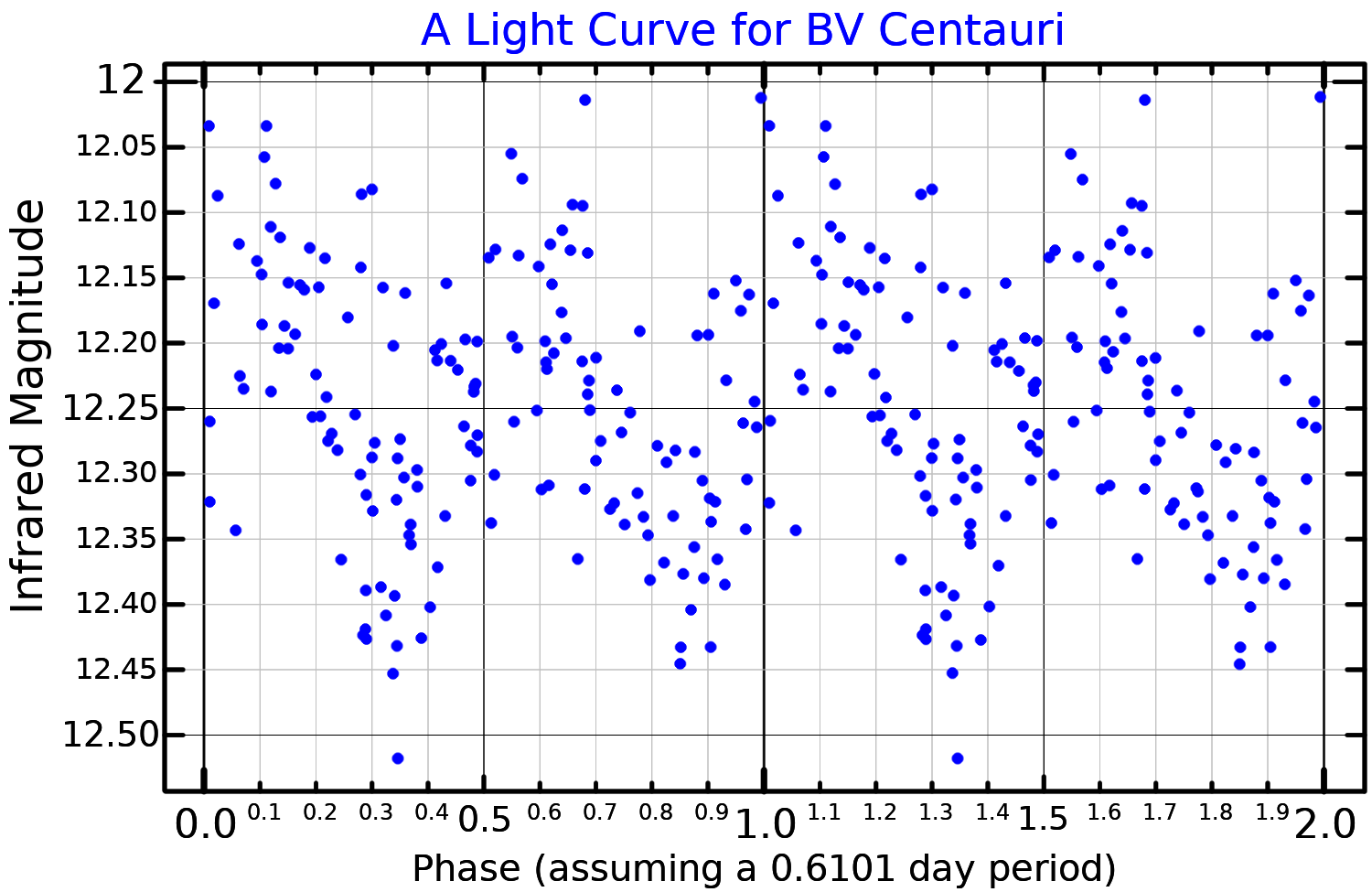
- A near infrared (I band) light curve for BV Centauri from ASAS data, adapted from Kiraga (2012)

Observation data Epoch J2000 Equinox ICRS
- Constellation: Centaurus
- Right ascension: 13^{h} 31^{m} 19.485^{s}
- Declination: −54° 58′ 33.52″
- Apparent magnitude (V): 10.7 to 14.0

Characteristics
- Spectral type: G5-G8IV-V (secondary)
- U−B color index: -0.22
- B−V color index: 0.77
- Variable type: SS Cyg

Astrometry
Radial velocity (R_{v})	-22.3 km/s
Proper motion (μ)	RA: -25.8 mas/yr Dec.: -1.4 mas/yr
Parallax (π)	2.81±0.38 mas
Distance	approx. 1,200 ly (approx. 360 pc)
Absolute magnitude (M_{V})	+3.0 - +5.8

Orbit
Period (P)	0.611±0.002 days
Semi-major axis (a)	2.53×10^{11} cm (0.017 au)
Inclination (i)	53±4, 62±5°
Semi-amplitude (K_{1}) (primary)	128±3 km/s
Semi-amplitude (K_{2}) (secondary)	137.3±0.3 km/s

Details

Primary (white dwarf)
Mass	1.18^{+0.28}_{−0.16} M_{☉}
Surface gravity (log g)	8.3 cgs
Temperature	40000 ± 1000 K
Rotational velocity (v sin i)	500 ± 100 km/s

Secondary
Mass	1.05^{+0.23}_{−0.14} M_{☉}
Radius	1.41 ± 0.04 R_{☉}
Surface gravity (log g)	3.5 cgs
Temperature	5250 K

Other designations
- BV Centauri, 2MASS J13311951-5458335, AAVSO 1325-54

Database references
SIMBAD	data

BV Centauri is a cataclysmic variable binary star in the constellation Centaurus. It is a dwarf nova, and undergoes rapid increases in brightness that are recurrent with a mean period of 150 days. This period seems to have increased in the last few decades. During quiescence, its visual apparent magnitude is about 13, with variations of a few tenths of magnitude over an orbit due to differences in the star's visible surface area (ellipsoidal variability), brightening to a maximum magnitude of 10.7 during outbursts. From its luminosity, it is estimated that the system is about 500 parsecs (1,600 ly) away from Earth. A Gaia parallax of 2.81 mas has been measured, corresponding to about 360 pc. William Francis Herschel Waterfield discovered that the star is a variable star, in 1929.

Cataclysmic variables are short-period binary systems in which a white dwarf primary accretes matter from a secondary star. For BV Centauri, the white dwarf and its companion have estimated masses of 1.18 and 1.05 times the mass of the Sun respectively, although alternate, conflicting mass measurements were reported too. The secondary is a conventional star with a spectral type of G5-G8IV-V and it is assumed to contribute to half of the visual luminosity of the system. It is thought to have a radius of 1.4 R_{☉} and so to be significantly evolved away from the zero age main sequence. The reconstruction of its surface by Doppler imaging revealed it to be a highly magnetically active star, with about 25% of its surface covered in starspots which are much more abundant on the hemisphere facing the white dwarf. Furthermore, a prominence was detected above the secondary star's surface, also in the side facing the white dwarf. The white dwarf primary can be observed clearly at ultraviolet wavelengths where it is the strongest source. Any accretion disk in the system appears relatively faint.

The system has a period of 0.611179 days (16.7 hours), one of the longest periods for a dwarf nova, and is inclined by 53 ± 4° in relation to the plane of the sky.

It has been noted that BV Centauri's light curve during outbursts has anomalous behavior for a dwarf nova, with a long interval of up to 15 days before reaching peak brightness and no plateau at maximum brightness, and it has been compared to the classic nova GK Persei. Based on this, it has been proposed that BV Centauri could have generated an unobserved nova outburst in the 19th century, which was missed by the observers at the time.
