= Achernar =

Brightest star in the constellation Eridanus

- Location of Achernar (circled)

Observation data Epoch J2000 Equinox ICRS
- Constellation: Eridanus
- Pronunciation: /ˈeɪkərnɑːr/
- Right ascension: 01^{h} 37^{m} 42.84548^{s}
- Declination: −57° 14′ 12.3101″
- Apparent magnitude (V): 0.40–0.46

Characteristics
- Spectral type: B3 Vpe + A1V-A3V
- U−B color index: −0.66
- B−V color index: −0.16
- Variable type: Be

Astrometry
Radial velocity (R_{v})	+16 km/s
Proper motion (μ)	RA: 87.00±0.58 mas/yr Dec.: −38.24±0.50 mas/yr
Parallax (π)	23.39±0.57 mas
Distance	139 ± 3 ly (43 ± 1 pc)
Absolute magnitude (M_{V})	−2.74±0.05

Orbit
Period (P)	7.0389±0.0015 yr
Semi-major axis (a)	0.17190±0.00025" (7.35±0.18 AU)
Eccentricity (e)	0.7258±0.0015
Inclination (i)	30.32±0.35°
Longitude of the node (Ω)	310.91±0.80°
Periastron epoch (T)	2008.7582±0.0014
Argument of periastron (ω) (secondary)	172.05±0.87°

Details

A
Mass	6.0 M_{☉}
Radius	6.78 – 9.16 R_{☉}
Luminosity	3,493±429 L_{☉}
Surface gravity (log g)	2.772 – 3.561 cgs
Temperature	12,673 – 17,124 K
Rotation	37.25 h
Rotational velocity (v sin i)	250 km/s
Age	63 Myr

B
Mass	2.0±0.1 M_{☉}
Radius	1.70±0.08 R_{☉}
Luminosity	17.5±5.1 L_{☉}
Temperature	9,064±624 K

Other designations
- Achernar, α Eri, 2 G. Eri, CD−57°316, CPD−57°334, FK5 54, HD 10144, HIP 7588, HR 472, SAO 232481

Database references
SIMBAD	data

Achernar is the brightest star in the constellation of Eridanus and the ninth-brightest in the night sky. It has the Bayer designation Alpha Eridani, which is Latinized from α Eridani and abbreviated Alpha Eri or α Eri. The name Achernar applies to the primary component of a binary system. The two components are designated Alpha Eridani A (the primary) and B (the secondary), with the latter known informally as Achernar B. As determined by the Hipparcos astrometry satellite, this system is located at a distance of approximately 139 light-years (43 parsecs) from the Sun.

Of the ten brightest stars in the night-time sky by apparent magnitude, (Note: The ten brightest stars in the nighttime sky in terms of apparent magnitude are, from brightest to dimmest, Sirius, Canopus, Alpha Centauri, Arcturus, Vega, Capella, Rigel, Procyon, Achernar, and Betelgeuse) Alpha Eridani is the hottest and bluest in color because it is spectral type B. Achernar has an unusually rapid rotational velocity, causing it to become oblate in shape. The secondary is smaller, is spectral type A, and orbits Achernar at a distance of 7.35 AU.

== Nomenclature ==
α Eridani (Latinised to Alpha Eridani) is the system's Bayer designation. The designations of the two components—Alpha Eridani A and B—derive from the convention used by the Washington Multiplicity Catalog (WMC) for multiple star systems, and adopted by the International Astronomical Union (IAU).

The system bears the traditional name of Achernar (sometimes spelled Achenar), derived from the Arabic آخر النهر ākhir an-nahr, meaning "The End of the River". (Note: In modern Arabic آخر النهر means "down the river".) However, it seems that this name originally referred to Theta Eridani instead, which latterly was known by the similar traditional name Acamar, with the same etymology. The IAU Working Group on Star Names (WGSN) approved the name with the spelling Achernar for the component Alpha Eridani A on 30 June 2016 and it is now so included in the List of IAU-approved Star Names.

In Chinese caused by adaptation of the European Southern Hemisphere constellations into the Chinese system, 水委 (Shuǐ Wěi), meaning Crooked Running Water, refers to an asterism consisting of Achernar, ζ Phoenicis and η Phoenicis. Consequently, Achernar itself is known as 水委一 (Shuǐ Wěi yī, English: the First Star of Crooked Running Water).

The indigenous Boorong people of northwestern Victoria, Australia, named it Yerrerdetkurrk. The Wardaman name is Gawalyan, the echidna.

=== Namesake ===
USS Achernar (AKA-53) was a United States Navy attack cargo ship named after the star.

== Properties ==
Achernar is in the deep southern sky and never rises above the horizon north of 33°N, roughly the latitude of Dallas, Texas. It is best seen from the Southern Hemisphere in November; it is circumpolar south of 33°S, roughly the latitude of Santiago. At this latitude—e.g., the south coast of South Africa (Cape Town to Port Elizabeth)—when at lower culmination it is only 1 degree above the horizon. Further south, it is visible at all times during night.

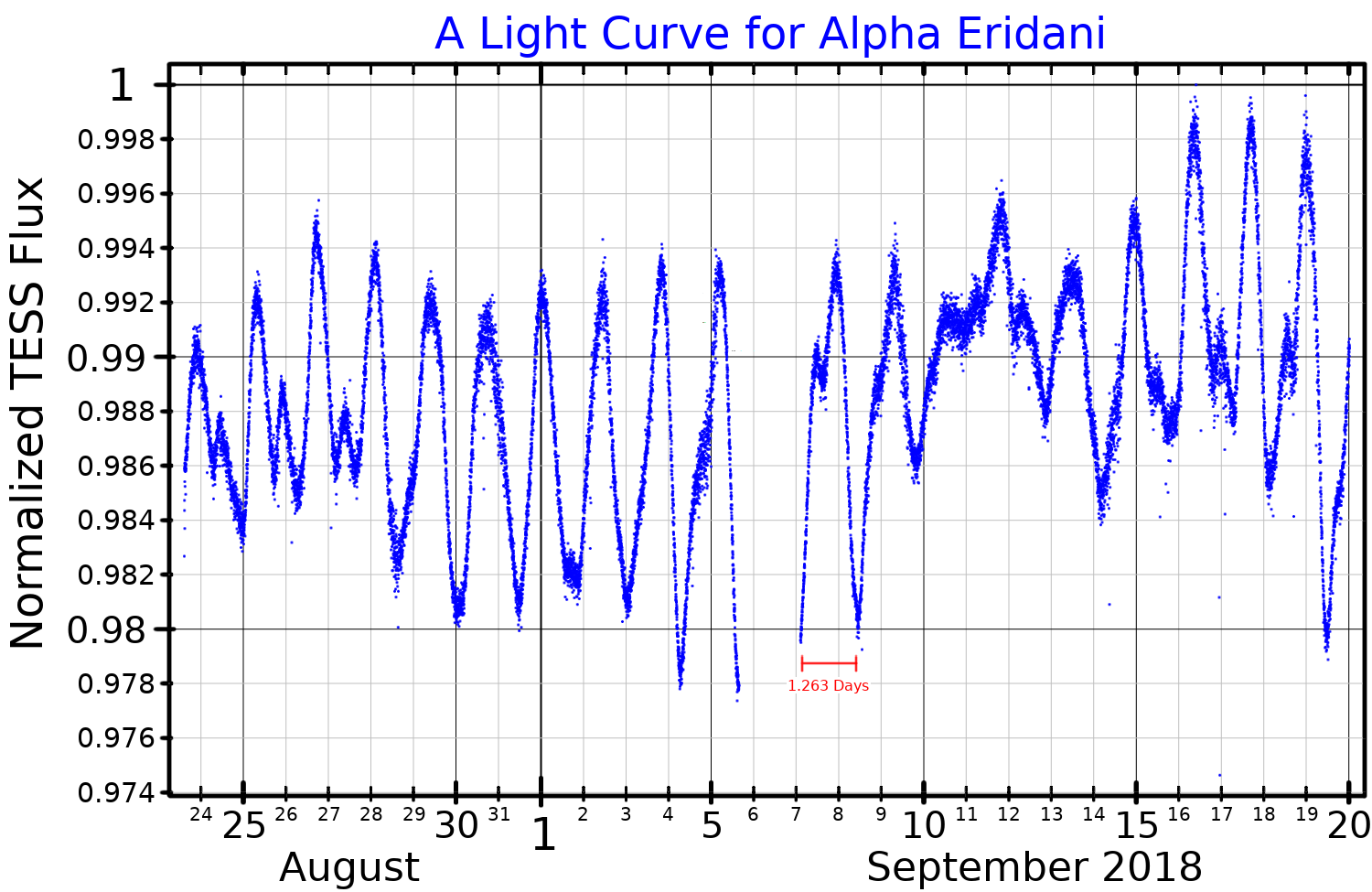
A light curve for Alpha Eridani, plotted from TESS data, with the 1.263-day period listed in the GCVS shown in red

Achernar is a bright, blue star about six to seven times the mass of the Sun. It has a stellar classification of B6 Vep, but despite appearing similar to a main sequence star, it is thought to have recently exhausted the hydrogen in its core and begun to evolve away from the main sequence. It has expanded to an average radius eight times the Sun's and is about 3,000 times more luminous. Infrared observations of the star using an adaptive optics system on the Very Large Telescope show that it has a companion star in a close orbit. This appears to be an A-type star in the stellar classification range A0V–A3V, which suggests a stellar mass of about double that of the Sun. The separation of the two stars is 7.35 AU and their orbital period is 7 years.

The brightness of Achernar varies very slightly, by a maximum of 0.06 magnitudes or about 6%. A period of 1.263 d is given in the General Catalogue of Variable Stars, but several periods have been identified between about 17 h and 35 h. The longest periods are very similar to the rotation period of the star, although the exact period appears to vary as the rotational velocity of its upper atmosphere changes. The shortest periods may be harmonics of the longer periods. The variability type of Achernar is given only as a Be star and the exact causes of the brightness changes are unknown. The star itself appears to pulsate and the disk around it varies in size and shape as well as apparently disappearing at times.

Extreme rotation speed has flattened Achernar.

As of 2015, Achernar was the least spherical star known in the Milky Way. It spins so rapidly that it has assumed the shape of an oblate spheroid with an equatorial diameter 35% greater than its polar diameter. The oblateness of Achernar is comparable to that of the dwarf planet Haumea, and the stars of Altair and Regulus. The polar axis is inclined about 60.6° to the line of sight from the Earth. Since it is actually a binary star, its highly distorted shape may cause non-negligible departures of the companion's orbital trajectory with respect to a Keplerian ellipse.

Because of the distorted shape of this star, there is a significant temperature variation by latitude. At the pole, the temperature is 17,124 K, while the equator is at 12,673 K. The average temperature of the star is about 15,000 K. The high polar temperatures are generating a fast polar wind that is ejecting matter from the star, creating a polar envelope of hot gas and plasma. The entire star is surrounded by an extended envelope that can be detected by its excess infrared emission, or by its polarization. The presence of a circumstellar disk of ionized gas is a common feature of Be stars such as this. The disk is not stable and periodically collapses back into the star. The maximum polarization for Achernar's disk was observed in September 2014, and it is now decreasing.

== Co-moving companion ==
The red dwarf 2MASS J01375879−5645447 lies about half a degree north of Achernar. It has been identified as being at the same distance and sharing a common proper motion, as well as being of about the same age. The projected separation of the two is slightly over one light year and they would not be gravitationally bound, but it is proposed that both are part of the Tucana-Horologium association.

== Historical visibility ==
Precession caused Achernar to lie much further south in ancient times than at present: 7.5 degrees from the south celestial pole around 3400 BCE (declination −82° 40′) and still as far south as declination −76° by around 1500 BCE. Hence the Ancient Egyptians could not have known it. Even in 100 CE, its declination was around −67°, meaning Ptolemy could not possibly have seen it from Alexandria. However, it was visible from Syene in the time of Ptolemy's Almagest.

The first star atlas to contain Achernar in the chart of Eridanus is Johann Bayer's Uranometria. Bayer did not observe it himself, and the first European knowledge of it is attributed to Pieter Dirkszoon Keyser on the first voyage of the Dutch to the East Indies ("Eerste Schipvaart"). Thus it was the only first-magnitude star not listed in the Almagest.

Alpha Eridani will continue to move north in the next few millennia, reaching its maximum northern declination between the 8th and 11th millennia, when it will be visible as far north as Germany and southern England.
