= WASP-5b =

Jovian size planet orbiting WASP-5

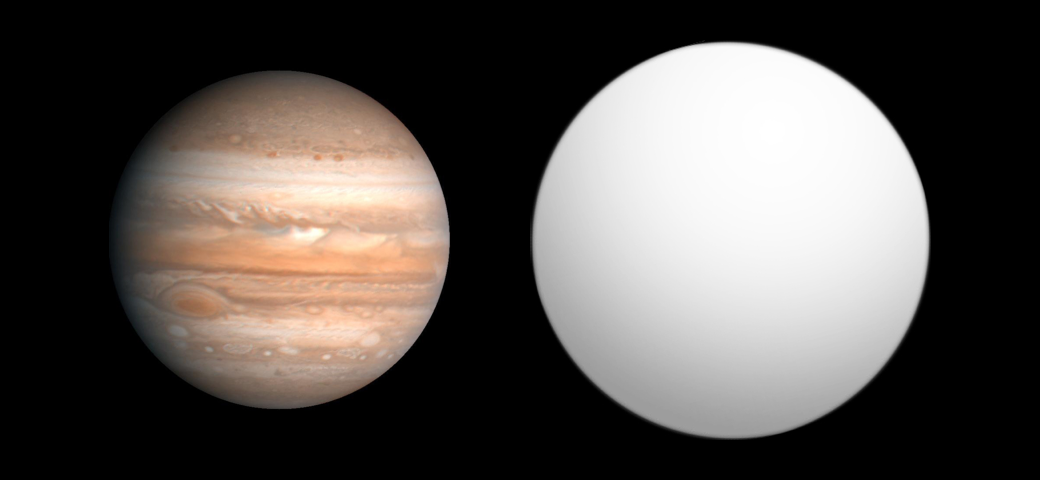
- Size comparison of WASP-5b with Jupiter.

Discovery
- Discovered by: Anderson et al. (SuperWASP)
- Discovery site: SAAO
- Discovery date: October 31, 2007
- Detection method: Transit

Orbital characteristics
- Semi-major axis: 0.02739 ± 0.00039 AU (4,097,000 ± 58,000 km)
- Eccentricity: <0.012
- Orbital period (sidereal): 1.62842953(52) d
- Inclination: 85.8°±1.1°
- Semi-amplitude: 268.2+4.6 −4.2 m/s
- Star: WASP-5

Physical characteristics
- Mean radius: 1.175±0.056 R_{J}
- Mass: 1.590+0.053 −0.052 M_{J}
- Mean density: 1.21+0.20 −0.16 g/cm^{3}
- Surface gravity: 28.6 m/s^{2} 2.9 g
- Temperature: 2000±90 K (1,730 °C; 3,140 °F)

WASP-5b is an exoplanet orbiting the star WASP-5 located approximately 1000 light-years away in the constellation Phoenix. The planet's mass and radius indicate that it is a gas giant with a similar bulk composition to Jupiter. The small orbital distance of WASP-5 b around its star means it belongs to a class of planets known as hot Jupiters. The planetary equilibrium temperature would be 1717 K, but the measured dayside temperature is higher, with a 2015 study finding 2500±100 K and a 2020 study finding 2000±90 K.

A study in 2012, utilizing the Rossiter–McLaughlin effect, determined that the planetary orbit is probably aligned with the equatorial plane of the star, with misalignment equal to 12.1^{+8}_{−10}°.

== See also ==
- SuperWASP
- WASP-4b
- WASP-3b
