= Phi Phoenicis =

Star in the constellation Phoenix

Observation data Epoch J2000.0 Equinox J2000.0 (ICRS)
- Constellation: Phoenix
- Right ascension: 01^{h} 54^{m} 22.032^{s}
- Declination: −42° 29′ 48.94″
- Apparent magnitude (V): 5.115

Characteristics
- Spectral type: B9pHgMn; B9V
- U−B color index: −0.125
- B−V color index: −0.06

Astrometry
Radial velocity (R_{v})	10.44±0.04 km/s
Proper motion (μ)	RA: −33.476 mas/yr Dec.: −30.113 mas/yr
Parallax (π)	10.185±0.1886 mas
Distance	320 ± 6 ly (98 ± 2 pc)
Absolute magnitude (M_{V})	0.243±0.076

Orbit
Period (P)	1,126.11±0.16 d
Semi-major axis (a)	36.3 mas
Eccentricity (e)	0.589±0.004
Inclination (i)	93±4.7°
Periastron epoch (T)	2453766.2±2.2
Argument of periastron (ω) (secondary)	3.52±0.01 [rad]°
Semi-amplitude (K_{1}) (primary)	9.21±0.09 km/s

Details

φ Phe A
Mass	3.0±0.12 M_{☉}
Radius	2.817±0.157 R_{☉}
Luminosity	87±7 L_{☉}
Surface gravity (log g)	3.8±0.1 cgs
Temperature	10,500±200 K
Metallicity [Fe/H]	0.15 dex
Rotation	9.53077±0.00011 d
Rotational velocity (v sin i)	13.62±0.22 km/s
Age	260 Myr

φ Phe B
Mass	0.91±0.025 M_{☉}

Other designations
- φ Phe, CPD−43°583, FK5 1053, GC 2315, HD 11753, HIP 8882, HR 558, SAO 215697

Database references
SIMBAD	data

Phi Phoenicis, Latinized from φ Phoenicis, is a binary star system in the southern constellation of Phoenix. It is faintly visible to the naked eye with an apparent visual magnitude of 5.1. Based upon an annual parallax shift of 10.185 mas as seen from Earth, it is located approximately 320 light years from the Sun. It is moving away with a heliocentric radial velocity of 10.4 km/s.

== Primary star ==
The primary component is a B-type main-sequence star with a stellar classification of B9 V. It is a type of chemically peculiar star known as an HgMn star, which means it shows surface overabundances of certain elements including mercury and manganese, and deficiencies in others including helium, cobalt. The star has about three times the mass of the Sun and is radiating 87 times the Sun's luminosity from its photosphere at an effective temperature of about 10,500 K.

The reconstruction of the surface of Phi Phoenicis by Doppler imaging showed it to be heterogeneous with regions of different elemental abundances. In particular, the star forms spots with high or low abundances of yttrium, strontium, titanium, and chromium. The comparison of the abundance maps in different epochs revealed that the spot configurations vary on monthly or yearly time scales. The spectral lines of the irregularly distributed elements show variations that allowed a precise rotation period of 9.53 days to be determined, and also show evidence of long term abundance changes. The analysis of the spots suggests that the rotation axis is inclined to the line of sight by an angle of about 53°, and shows evidence of very weak differential rotation. The starspots probably cause milimagnitude variations in the brightness of Phi Phoenicis, even though there are no precise observations to confirm this.

The origin of the starspots and chemical anomalies in HgMn stars is uncertain and has generated controversy. Typically, such as for Ap and Bp stars, inhomogeneously distributed elements are attributed to be large-scale organized magnetic fields, but there are not conclusive detection of magnetic fields in HgMn stars. In 2012, a study claimed to have detected a weak magnetic field in Phi Phoenicis correlated with the spots, but this has been contested. It is believed that diffusion processes in the atmosphere may be related to the chemical anomalies, but this does not explain quantitatively the observed variations.

== Secondary star ==
Phi Phoenicis is a single-lined spectroscopic binary with a period of 1126 days and an eccentricity of 0.59. There is no evidence for additional stars in the system, but in the past this has been considered a triple system, due to the detection of the wrong spectroscopic period.

The variability of the radial velocity of Phi Phoenicis was discovered in the first spectroscopic observations of the star in 1911, and was confirmed in 1982, but the data were still inclusive and no orbit was determined. The first orbital solution was finally published in 1999, yielding a period of 41.4 days. At the same time, in 1997, the Hipparcos Catalogue was published revealing Phi Phoenicis to be an astrometric binary with an estimated period of 878 days (circular orbit solution). Thus Phi Phoenicis became a triple star system, with a visible star, a spectroscopic companion, and an astrometric companion. A 2013 study, with new high-resolution radial velocity data from the FEROS, HARPS and CORALIE spectrographs, showed that the period of the spectroscopic orbit is actually closer to 1126 days, and not 41.4 days; this indicates that the spectroscopic companion is the same one that the astrometric data detected. In the same year another study fitted the astrometric data to the spectroscopic orbit, revealing the orbital inclination of the system and allowing to estimate the properties of the secondary star.

The orbit of the system is highly eccentricity and is seen almost side-on, with an inclination of 93 ± 4.7°. The high uncertainty means that the occurrence of eclipses is possible, despite being unlikely. From this inclination and assuming a mass of 3.0 M_{☉} for the primary, the binary mass function can be used to calculate a mass of 0.91 M_{☉} for the secondary. The secondary star is assumed to be a yellow dwarf with an effective temperature around 5,500 K, and is 5.7 visual magnitudes fainter than the primary. The average separation between the two star is estimated at around 3.4 AU.
