= WASP-5 =

G-type main-sequence star

Observation data Epoch J2000.0 Equinox ICRS
- Constellation: Phoenix
- Right ascension: 23^{h} 57^{m} 23.75647^{s}
- Declination: −41° 16′ 37.7437″
- Apparent magnitude (V): 12.146

Characteristics
- Evolutionary stage: Main sequence
- Spectral type: G4V
- Apparent magnitude (B): 12.808±0.02
- Apparent magnitude (V): 12.146±0.01
- Apparent magnitude (J): 10.949±0.022
- Apparent magnitude (H): 10.650±0.025
- Apparent magnitude (K): 10.598±0.023

Astrometry
Radial velocity (R_{v})	20.49±0.67 km/s
Proper motion (μ)	RA: 7.406(14) mas/yr Dec.: −16.072(14) mas/yr
Parallax (π)	3.1883±0.0150 mas
Distance	1,023 ± 5 ly (314 ± 1 pc)

Details
Mass	1.033±0.045 M_{☉}
Radius	1.088±0.040 R_{☉}
Temperature	5770±65 K
Metallicity [Fe/H]	0.090±0.090 dex
Rotation	16.20±0.40 d
Rotational velocity (v sin i)	3.40±0.70 km/s
Age	5.84±1.86 Gyr

Other designations
- TOI-250, TIC 184240683, WASP-5, GSC 08018-00199, 2MASS J23572375-4116377, DENIS J235723.7-411637, UCAC2 14323784

Database references
SIMBAD	data
Exoplanet Archive	data

WASP-5 is a magnitude 12 G-type main-sequence star located about 1,020 light-years (310 parsecs) away in the constellation Phoenix. The star is likely older than the Sun, slightly enriched in heavy elements and is rotating rapidly, being spun up by the tides raised by the giant planet on a close orbit.

== Planetary system ==
This star has one exoplanet, WASP-5b, detected by the SuperWASP project in 2007.

The WASP-5 planetary system
Companion (in order from star)	Mass	Semimajor axis (AU)	Orbital period (days)	Eccentricity	Inclination (°)	Radius
b	1.590+0.053 −0.052 M_{J}	0.02739±0.00039	1.62842953(52)	<0.012	85.8±1.1	1.175±0.056 R_{J}

== See also ==
- SuperWASP
- WASP-4
- WASP-3
- List of extrasolar planets
