= AE Phoenicis =

Star in the constellation Phoenix

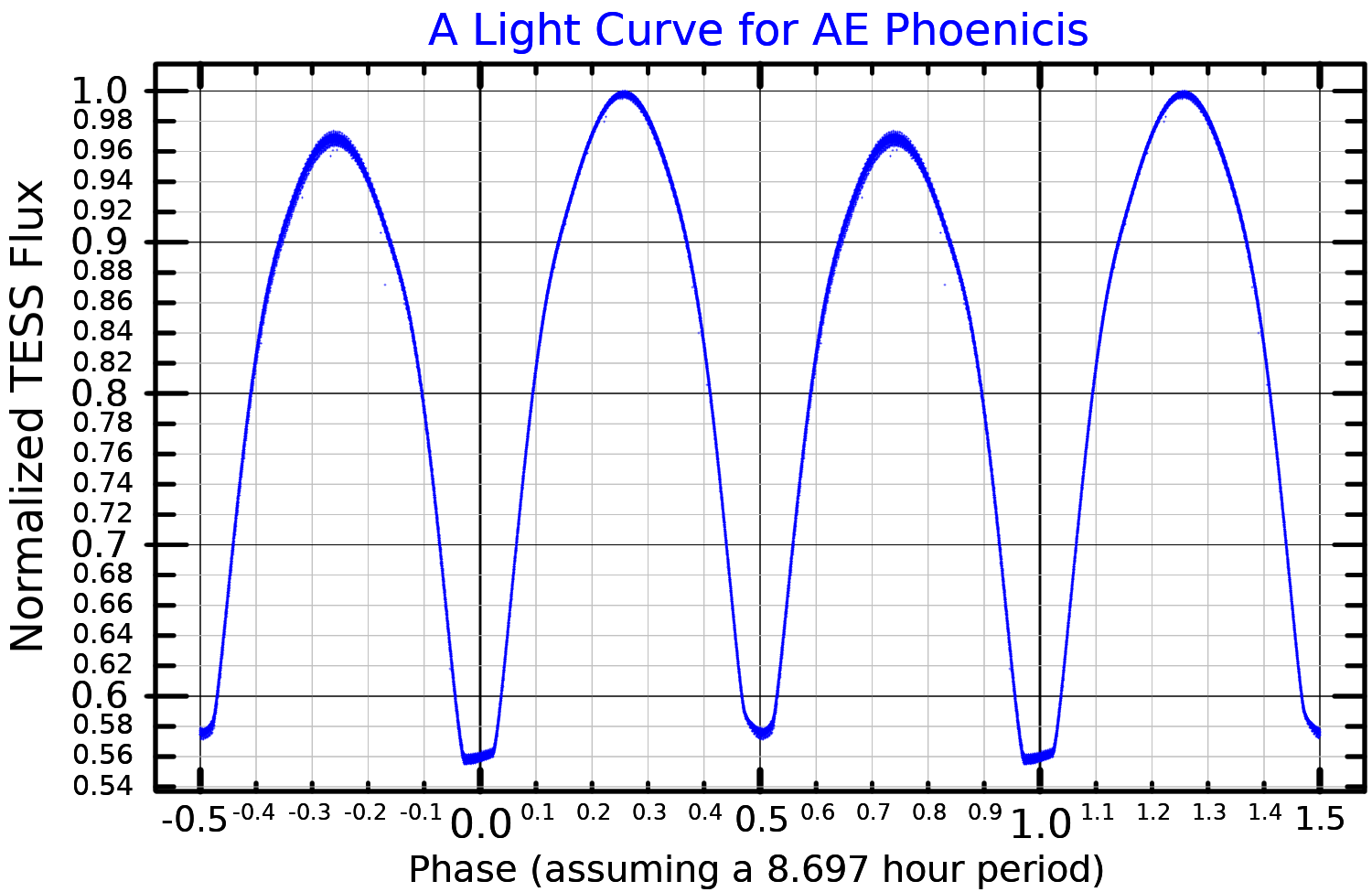
- A light curve for AE Phoenicis, plotted from TESS data

Observation data Epoch J2000 Equinox ICRS
- Constellation: Phoenix
- Right ascension: 01^{h} 32^{m} 32.93^{s}
- Declination: −49° 31′ 41.3″
- Apparent magnitude (V): 7.56 – 8.25

Characteristics
- Evolutionary stage: G0V + G0V
- Variable type: W UMa

Astrometry
Radial velocity (R_{v})	21.2 km/s
Proper motion (μ)	RA: +151.48 mas/yr Dec.: -53.94 mas/yr
Parallax (π)	19.4490±0.0260 mas
Distance	167.7 ± 0.2 ly (51.42 ± 0.07 pc)
Absolute magnitude (M_{V})	4.104

Details
Age	3.20 ± 1.62 Gyr

Primary
Mass	1.38 ± 0.06 M_{☉}
Radius	1.29 ± 0.03 R_{☉}
Luminosity	1.74^{+0.30}_{−0.26} L_{☉}
Temperature	6,083 K

Secondary
Mass	0.63 ± 0.02 M_{☉}
Radius	0.81 ± 0.02 R_{☉}
Luminosity	0.83^{+0.15}_{−0.12} L_{☉}
Temperature	6,310 K

Other designations
- AE Phe, CD−50°410, HD 9528, HIP 7183, SAO 215545

Database references
SIMBAD	data

AE Phoenicis is a variable star in the constellation of Phoenix. An eclipsing binary, its apparent magnitude has a maximum of 7.56, dimming to 8.25 during primary eclipse and 8.19 during secondary eclipse. From parallax measurements by the Gaia spacecraft, the system is located at a distance of 168 light-years (51.4 parsecs) from Earth.

AE Phoenicis is a contact binary of W Ursae Majoris type, composed of two stars so close that their surfaces touch each other. They are separated by 2.70 solar radii and orbit each other with a period of 0.3624 days. They are both classified as G-type main-sequence stars of spectral type G0V. With effective temperatures of 6,083 and 6,310 K, the system is classified as a W Ursae Majoris variable of subtype W, where the secondary star is hotter than the primary; for this reason, the primary eclipses are caused by the occultation of the secondary star. The orbit is circular and is inclined by 86.5° in relation to the plane of the sky.

The combination of photometric and spectroscopic data have allowed the direct determination of the parameters of the stars. The primary component has a mass of 1.38 times the solar mass and a radius of 1.29 times the solar radius, while the secondary has 0.63 times the solar mass and 0.81 times the solar radius. In visible light, the primary star contributes 66.5% of the system's luminosity, while the secondary contributes the rest (33.5%). The light curve shows asymmetries and variations that indicate starspots on the surface of the stars. The reconstruction of the surface of the system by Doppler imaging revealed significant spot coverage in the entire surface of both stars, and the spots seem to evolve in a timescale of days.

Since the stars are in contact, there is considerable mass transfer from the secondary to the primary. It is estimated that the secondary star was initially the more massive star, with 1.69 times the solar mass, while the primary had an initial mass of 1.02 times the solar mass. Observations show the orbital period of the system to be increasing at a rate of 6.17×10^{−8} days per year, which is direct evidence of this mass transfer. The system was born as a detached binary with an estimated separation of 12.39 solar radii and period of 3.07 days, which by angular momentum loss evolved to the current contact configuration. In the future the two stars will probably merge into a single, fast-rotating star.

Gaia Data Release 2 catalogued a 16.0-magnitude star (G band) with very similar parallax and proper motions to AE Phoenicis. It is separated from AE Phoenicis by 6.0 arcseconds and has a temperature of 4,640 K.
