= Xi Phoenicis =

Binary star in the constellation Phoenix

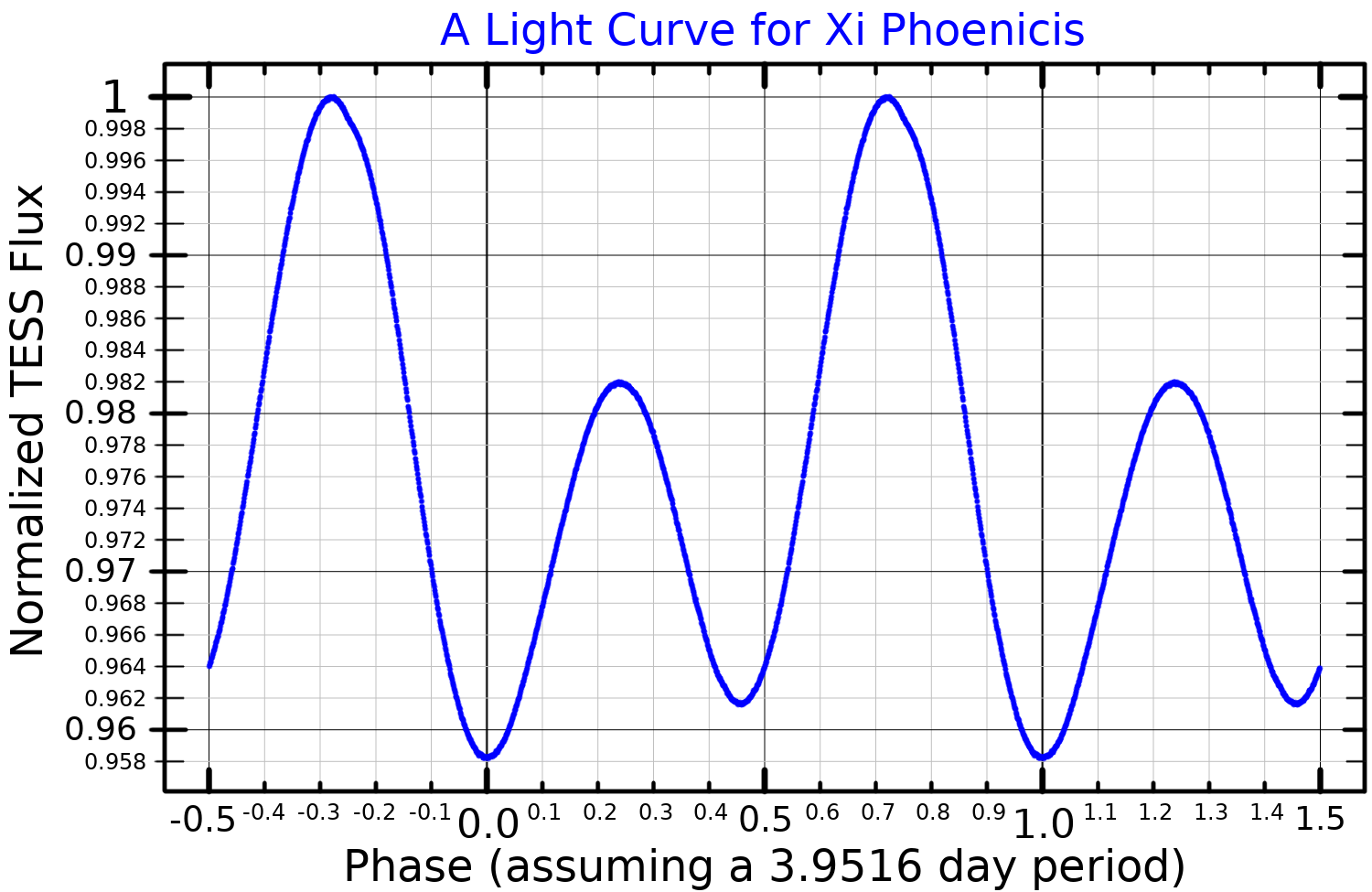
- A light curve for Xi Phoenicis plotted from TESS data

Observation data Epoch J2000.0 Equinox J2000.0 (ICRS)
- Constellation: Phoenix
- Right ascension: 00^{h} 41^{m} 46.30191^{s}
- Declination: −56° 30′ 05.2370″
- Apparent magnitude (V): 5.70 + 9.98

Characteristics
- Spectral type: A3 Vp(SrCr v. st; K sn)
- B−V color index: +0.19
- Variable type: α^{2} CVn

Astrometry

ξ Phe A
Radial velocity (R_{v})	+9.8±2.9 km/s
Proper motion (μ)	RA: +90.35 mas/yr Dec.: +56.79 mas/yr
Parallax (π)	14.6127±0.0903 mas
Distance	223 ± 1 ly (68.4 ± 0.4 pc)
Absolute bolometric magnitude (M_{bol})	1.64±0.079

ξ Phe B
Radial velocity (R_{v})	+9.19±0.28 km/s
Proper motion (μ)	RA: +92.61 mas/yr Dec.: +54.69 mas/yr
Parallax (π)	14.7541±0.0357 mas
Distance	221.1 ± 0.5 ly (67.8 ± 0.2 pc)

Details

ξ Phe A
Mass	1.91±0.03 M_{☉}
Radius	2.04±0.26 R_{☉}
Luminosity	17.4+1.7 −1.6 L_{☉}
Surface gravity (log g)	4.0±0.2 cgs
Temperature	8,300±250 K
Rotation	3.9516±0.0003 d
Rotational velocity (v sin i)	22.5±2 km/s
Age	680+100 −120 Myr

ξ Phe B
Mass	0.81 M_{☉}
Radius	0.76+0.04 −0.03 R_{☉}
Luminosity	0.328±0.001 L_{☉}
Temperature	4,999+116 −100 K

Other designations
- ξ Phe, CD−57°137, HD 3980, HIP 3277, HR 183, SAO 232152, WDS J00418-5630A

Database references
SIMBAD	data

Xi Phoenicis, Latinized from ξ Phoenicis, is a visual binary star system in the southern constellation of Phoenix. It is faintly visible to the naked eye, having an apparent visual magnitude of 5.70. Based upon an annual parallax shift of 14.61 mas as measured from Earth, it is located around 223 light years from the Sun. The system is moving away from the Sun with a radial velocity of about +10 km/s.

== Primary star ==
The primary is a chemically peculiar Ap star with a stellar classification of A3 Vp(SrCr v. st; K sn), where the suffix notation indicating the spectrum shows very strong lines of Strontium and Chromium. The star has about double the solar radius and is radiating 17 times the Sun's luminosity from its photosphere at an effective temperature of 8,300 K. Stellar evolution models indicate its properties are consistent with a mass of 1.91 times the solar mass and an age of 680 million years.

Xi Phoenicis has a strong magnetic field that varies with the stellar rotation period. It can be modeled as a dipolar field with a polar strength of 7 kG, inclined by 88° in relation to the rotation axis of the star. The reconstruction of the stellar surface by Doppler imaging showed it is heterogenous with regions of different chemical abundances, which seem to be associated to the geometry of the magnetic field. For instance, lithium and oxygen have high abundances in the magnetic poles and low abundances in the magnetic equator, while elements like silicon and lanthanum are concentrated in a region between the magnetic equator and poles. However, these results have been contested, and it is possible the abundance maps are spurious due to the strong magnetic field.

An Alpha^{2} Canum Venaticorum variable, Xi Phoenicis's visual magnitude varies between 5.68 and 5.78 with a period of 3.9516 days, which is the rotation period of the star and is also associated with changes in the spectrum and the magnetic field. The brightness variation is maximum in the v band, with an amplitude of 0.13 magnitudes. The light curve in this band is symmetrical and has two distinct minima separated by half a rotation period, while the two maxima are igual. In other bands the variability is smaller or even absent, and doesn't show a regular pattern like in v. The star is similar in many aspects to rapidly oscillating Ap stars, but does not display the rapid pulsations typical of these stars.

== Secondary star ==
Xi Phoenicis is known as a double star since 1834, the date of the first registered observation in the Washington Double Star Catalogue. The relative position of the two components has remained constant to this day, confirming they have a common proper motion and form a physical binary system. The secondary star has a visual apparent magnitude of 9.95 and in 2007 was located at an angular separation of 13.06 arcseconds and position angle of 252.5°, in relation to the primary. Considering the distance to the system, this corresponds to a projected separation of 875 AU between the stars. The mass of the secondary is estimated at 0.81 times the solar mass.

This star is in the second catalogue of the Gaia spacecraft, which measured independently a distance equal to that of the primary, and estimated a radius of 0.76 R_{☉}, luminosity of 0.33 L_{☉}, and effective temperature of 5,000 K.
