= WASP-3 =

Star in the constellation Lyra

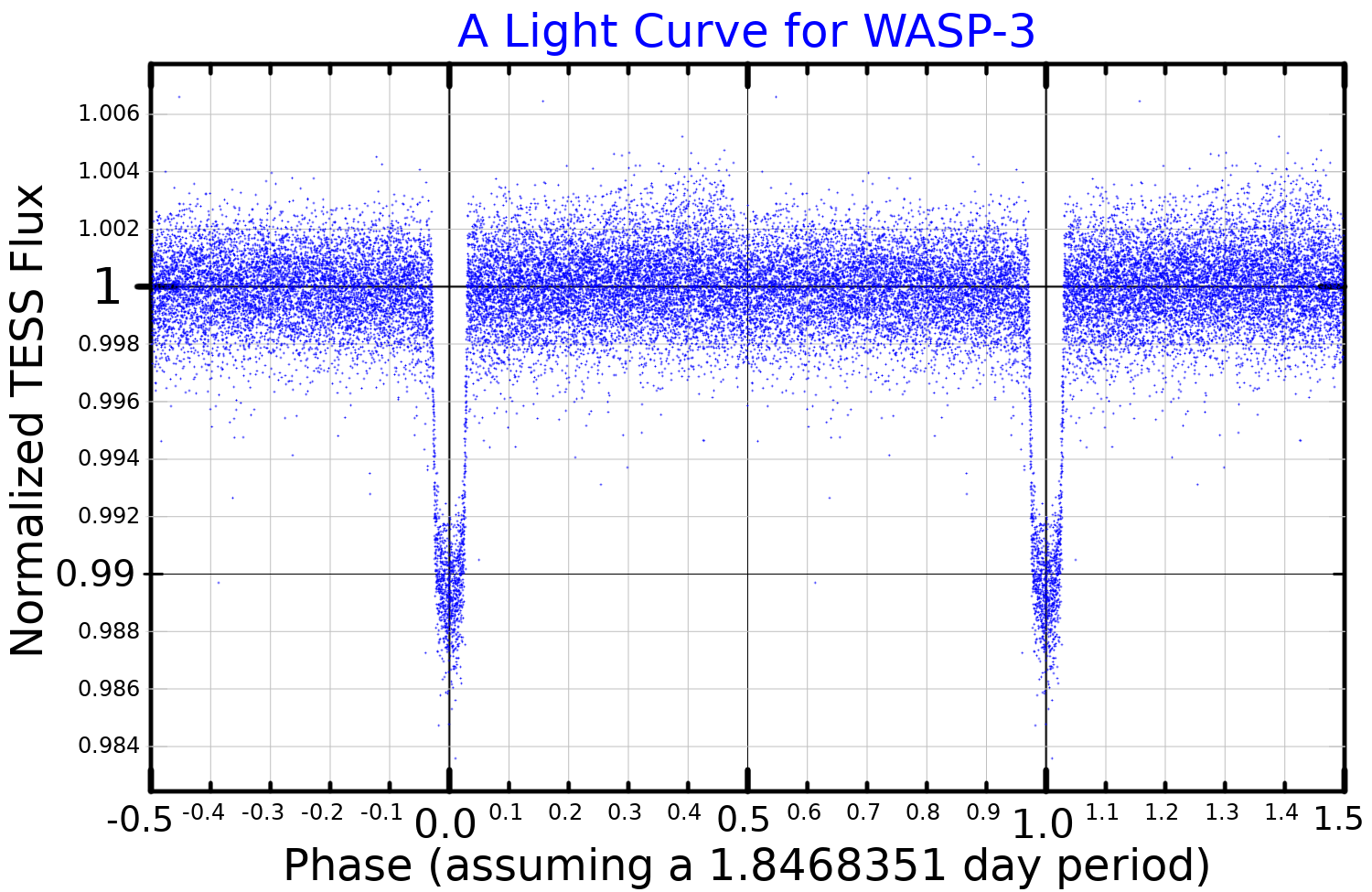
- A light curve for WASP-3, plotted from TESS data

Observation data Epoch J2000.0 Equinox ICRS
- Constellation: Lyra
- WASP-3A
- Right ascension: 18^{h} 34^{m} 31.6252^{s}
- Declination: +35° 39′ 41.492″
- Apparent magnitude (V): 10.63±0.05
- WASP-3C
- Right ascension: 18^{h} 34^{m} 30.2553^{s}
- Declination: +35° 39′ 34.004″

Characteristics

WASP-3A
- Evolutionary stage: main sequence
- Spectral type: F7V
- Apparent magnitude (B): 11.07±0.06
- Apparent magnitude (G): 10.4541±0.0028
- Apparent magnitude (J): 9.603±0.020
- Apparent magnitude (H): 9.407±0.014
- Apparent magnitude (K): 9.361±0.015
- Variable type: planetary transit

WASP-3B
- Apparent magnitude (J): 16.88±0.12
- Apparent magnitude (H): 16.090±0.079
- Apparent magnitude (K): 16.002±0.052

Astrometry

WASP-3A
Radial velocity (R_{v})	−5.490±0.007 km/s
Proper motion (μ)	RA: −5.791(12) mas/yr Dec.: −21.929(15) mas/yr
Parallax (π)	4.3338±0.0120 mas
Distance	753 ± 2 ly (230.7 ± 0.6 pc)

Details

WASP-3A
Mass	1.24+0.06 −0.11 M_{☉}
Radius	1.366±0.044 R_{☉}
Surface gravity (log g)	4.30+0.07 −0.03 cgs
Temperature	6400±100 K
Metallicity	0.00±0.20
Rotational velocity (v sin i)	13.4±1.5 km/s
Age	2.1±1.2 Gyr

WASP-3B
Mass	0.108±0.006 M_{☉}
Surface gravity (log g)	~5.22 cgs
Temperature	~2900 K

Position (relative to WASP-3A)
Component	WASP-3B
Epoch of observation	2012–2013
Angular distance	~1.19″
Position angle	~87.1°
Projected separation	300±20 AU

Position (relative to WASP-3A)
Component	WASP-3C
Angular distance	18.33192±0.00002″
Position angle	245.81872±0.00006°
Projected separation	4230 AU

Other designations
- V838 Lyr, BD+35 3293, TOI-2131, TIC 27848472, WASP-3, TYC 2636-195-1, GSC 02636-00195, 2MASS J18343163+3539415, USNO-B1.0 1256-00285133, 1SWASP J183431.62+353941.4

Database references
SIMBAD	data
Exoplanet Archive	data

WASP-3 is a triple star system located about 753 light-years (231 parsecs) away from the Sun in the constellation Lyra. The system has an apparent magnitude of 10. The brightest and most massive star of this system is WASP-3A, an F-type main sequence star which has one known transiting hot Jupiter exoplanet, WASP-3b. Since the planet transits the star, the star is classified as a planetary transit variable and has received the variable star designation V838 Lyrae.

== Triple system ==
WASP-3 has been identified as a triple star system in a 2019 study of astrometry from the Gaia mission. The brightest and most massive component of the system is WASP-3A, an F-type main sequence star that is 1.24 times as massive as the Sun and 1.31 times as large as the Sun in radius. WASP-3A appears to be a variable star; observations between 2007 and 2010 show that the star's chromospheric activity had increased during that time period. The second companion, WASP-3B, is a low-mass star about 0.11 times as massive as the Sun and has an effective temperature of about 2900 K. WASP-3B is separated eastward from WASP-3A at an angular separation of approximately 1.19 arcseconds, corresponding to a projected separation distance of about 300 AU. WASP-3B was first identified in observations from 2012 to 2013. The third companion, WASP-3C, is much more distant with an angular separation of approximately 18.3 arcseconds from WASP-3A, corresponding to a projected separation distance of 4230 AU. WASP-3C is about 0.77 times as massive as the Sun and has an effective temperature of about 4700 K.

== Planetary system ==
WASP-3A has one known transiting hot Jupiter extrasolar planet, WASP-3b, which was detected by the SuperWASP project in 2007. It was confirmed in 2008 by observations from the William Herschel Telescope.

In 2010, researchers proposed a second planet orbiting WASP-3A due to transit timing variations in WASP-3b. But in 2012 this proposal was refuted.

The WASP-3 planetary system
Companion (in order from star)	Mass	Semimajor axis (AU)	Orbital period (days)	Eccentricity	Inclination (°)	Radius
b	1.89±0.12 M_{J}	0.03182+0.00080 −0.00085	1.8468351(4)	<0.0058	83.72±0.39	1.416±0.047 R_{J}

== See also ==
- SuperWASP
- WASP-4
