= WASP-96 =

Star in the constellation Phoenix

Observation data Epoch J2000.0 Equinox J2000.0
- Constellation: Phoenix
- Right ascension: 00^{h} 04^{m} 11.13768^{s}
- Declination: −47° 21′ 38.3208″
- Apparent magnitude (V): 12.2

Characteristics
- Evolutionary stage: Main sequence
- Spectral type: G8

Astrometry
Radial velocity (R_{v})	−1.10±0.50 km/s
Proper motion (μ)	RA: 25.594 mas/yr Dec.: 2.192 mas/yr
Parallax (π)	2.8590±0.0154 mas
Distance	1,141 ± 6 ly (350 ± 2 pc)

Details
Mass	1.06±0.09 M_{☉}
Radius	1.05±0.05 R_{☉}
Luminosity	1.00 L_{☉}
Surface gravity (log g)	4.42±0.02 cgs
Temperature	5540±140 K
Metallicity [Fe/H]	+0.14±0.19 dex
Rotation	35.0
Rotational velocity (v sin i)	1.5±1.3 km/s
Age	9.4+3.3 −2.9 Gyr

Other designations
- TOI-247, TIC 160148385, WASP-96, 2MASS J00041112-4721382

Database references
SIMBAD	data
Exoplanet Archive	data

WASP-96 is a G8-type star, located approximately 1140 light-years from Earth in the constellation of Phoenix.

It is known to host at least one exoplanet, WASP-96b. It was discovered in 2013 by the Wide Angle Search for Planets (WASP), utilising the transit method. In July 2022, NASA announced that a spectrum of the planet would be featured in the initial science release from the James Webb Space Telescope.

== Planetary system ==
Observations from the James Webb Space Telescope show that WASP-96b displays a distinct signature of water, along with evidence for clouds and haze in its spectrum, in contrast to what was previously believed to be an entirely cloudless atmosphere.

The WASP-96 planetary system
Companion (in order from star)	Mass	Semimajor axis (AU)	Orbital period (days)	Eccentricity	Inclination	Radius
b	0.490+0.049 −0.047 M_{J}	0.0454±0.0013	3.4252602(27)	<0.11	85.60±0.20°	1.20±0.06 R_{J}

== See also ==
- List of stars in Phoenix
