= AD Phoenicis =

Star in the constellation Phoenix

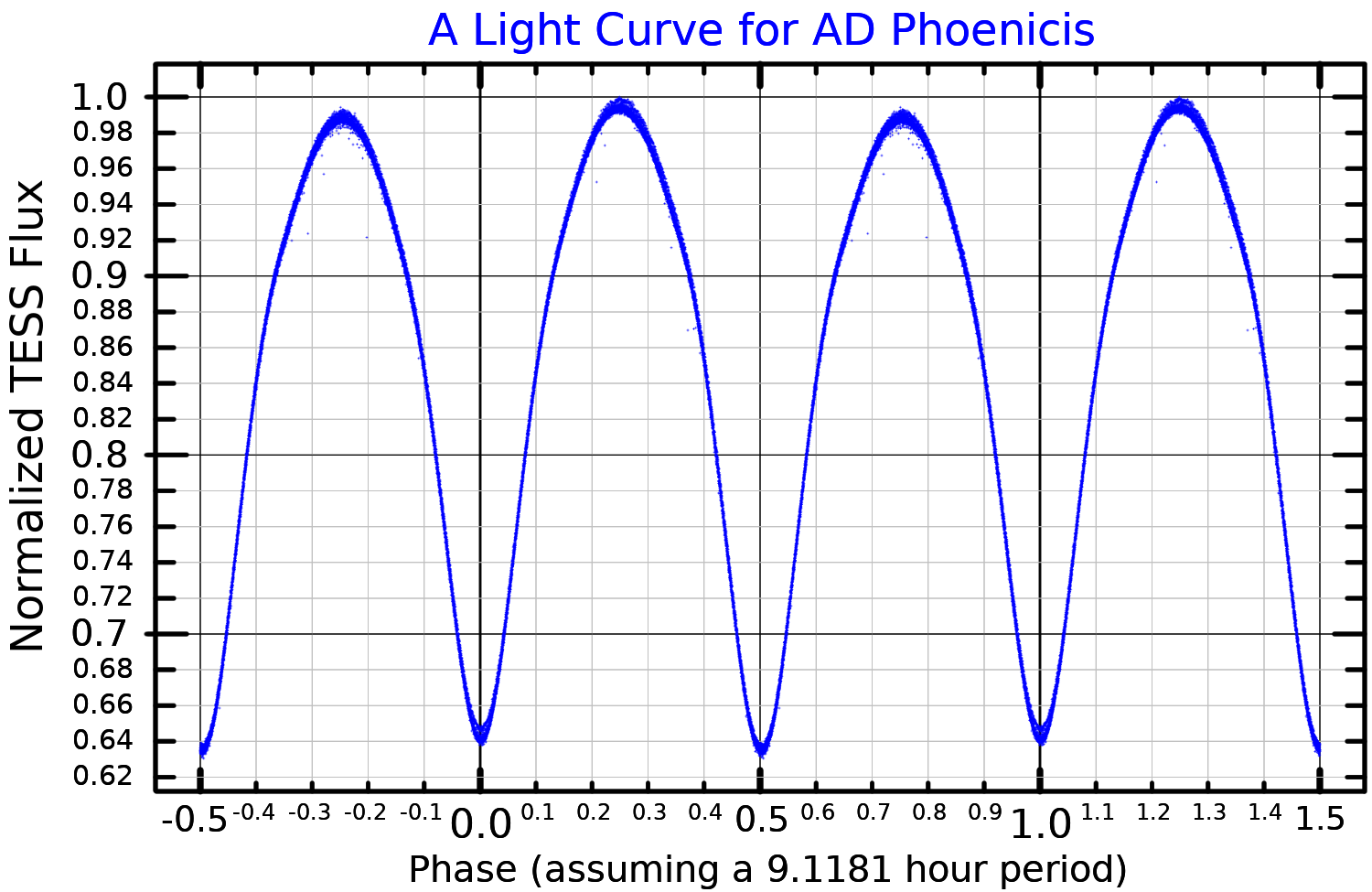
- A light curve for AD Phoenicis, plotted from TESS data

Observation data Epoch J2000 Equinox J2000
- Constellation: Phoenix
- Right ascension: 01^{h} 16^{m} 38.07^{s}
- Declination: −39° 42′ 31.33″
- Apparent magnitude (V): 10.27 – 10.80

Characteristics
- Evolutionary stage: F9/G0V
- B−V color index: 0.56
- Variable type: W UMa

Astrometry
Radial velocity (R_{v})	28.87 ± 1.47 km/s
Proper motion (μ)	RA: −3.24 mas/yr Dec.: +23.04 mas/yr
Parallax (π)	4.9818±0.0311 mas
Distance	655 ± 4 ly (201 ± 1 pc)

Orbit
Period (P)	0.37992361 days
Semi-major axis (a)	2.46 R_{☉}
Inclination (i)	76.92 ± 0.06°
Semi-amplitude (K_{1}) (primary)	89.04±3.10 km/s
Semi-amplitude (K_{2}) (secondary)	242.41±1.42 km/s

Details

Primary
Mass	1.004 M_{☉}
Radius	1.17 R_{☉}
Luminosity	1.476 L_{☉}
Temperature	6,155 K

Secondary
Mass	0.378 M_{☉}
Radius	0.76 R_{☉}
Luminosity	0.706 L_{☉}
Temperature	5,835 K

Other designations
- AD Phe, CD−40°288, HIP 5955

Database references
SIMBAD	data

AD Phoenicis is a variable star in the constellation of Phoenix. An eclipsing binary, its apparent magnitude has a maximum of 10.27, dimming to 10.80 during primary and secondary eclipses, which are approximately equal. From parallax measurements by the Gaia spacecraft, the system is located at a distance of 655 light-years (201 parsecs) from Earth.

AD Phoenicis is a contact binary of W Ursae Majoris type, composed of two stars so close that their surfaces touch each other. They are separated by 2.46 solar radii and orbit each other with a period of 0.3799 days. The primary star has a mass of 1.00 solar mass and a radius of 1.17 solar radii, while the secondary has 0.38 solar masses and 0.76 solar radii. Their surface temperatures are very similar, 6,155 and 5,835 K, which is the reason for the eclipses being equal-depth.

In visible light, the primary star contributes 71.2% of the system's luminosity, while the secondary contributes the rest (28.8%). Previous analyses of the system suggested that the secondary star was eclipsed during the primary minimum and hence was hotter than the primary. The bolometric luminosity of the two stars combined is 2.298 L_{☉}. The eclipse's light curve shows an asymmetric feature that is best explained by a large starspot in the surface of the primary, about 700 K cooler than the rest of the photosphere. Asymmetry in the light curve may also be caused by starspots on one or both components, which would result in slightly results for the physical properties of the two stars.

Variations in the orbital period of the system have been detected, which were modelled as a continuous decrease in the period plus a cyclic oscillation. The period decrease of about 1.5×10^{−7} days per year is likely caused by mass transfer from the secondary to the primary star, while the oscillation can be explained by a third star in the system or by a magnetic activity cycle. In the third star hypothesis, its orbit would have a period of 56.2 ± 0.9 years and an eccentricity of 0.36 ± 0.01. A minimum mass of 0.257 solar masses is calculated, which corresponds to a red dwarf of spectral type M4–M5, consistent with the lack of photometric and spectroscopic evidence for this star.
