= HD 12055 =

Candidate binary star system in the constellation Phoenix

- Location of HD 12055 (circled)

Observation data Epoch J2000 Equinox ICRS
- Constellation: Phoenix
- Right ascension: 01^{h} 57^{m} 10.08491^{s}
- Declination: −47° 23′ 07.0936″
- Apparent magnitude (V): 4.82

Characteristics
- Spectral type: G6III-IIIb
- U−B color index: +0.51
- B−V color index: +0.88

Astrometry
Radial velocity (R_{v})	+13.36±0.22 km/s
Proper motion (μ)	RA: +102.213 mas/yr Dec.: +16.301 mas/yr
Parallax (π)	13.1010±0.2295 mas
Distance	249 ± 4 ly (76 ± 1 pc)
Absolute magnitude (M_{V})	0.42

Details
Mass	2.39 M_{☉}
Radius	10.40+0.46 −0.70 R_{☉}
Luminosity	71.1±1.4 L_{☉}
Surface gravity (log g)	3.04 cgs
Temperature	5,196+185 −112 K
Metallicity [Fe/H]	–0.02 dex
Rotational velocity (v sin i)	5.7±1.0 km/s
Age	1.08 Gyr

Other designations
- CD−47°597, GC 2369, HD 12055, HIP 9095, HR 574, SAO 215715

Database references
SIMBAD	data

HD 12055 is a candidate astrometric binary star system in the southern constellation of Phoenix, near the eastern constellation border with Eridanus. It is yellow in hue and is visible to the naked eye with an apparent visual magnitude of 4.82. The system is located at a distance of approximately 249 light years from the Sun based on parallax, and is drifting further away with a radial velocity of +13 km/s.

The visible component is an aging giant star with a stellar classification of G6III-IIIb. With the supply of hydrogen at its core exhausted, the star has cooled and expanded off the main sequence – at present it has ten times the girth of the Sun. It is around a billion years old with 2.4 times the mass of the Sun and is spinning with a projected rotational velocity of 6 km/s. The star is radiating 71 times the luminosity of the Sun from its photosphere at an effective temperature of 5,196 K.

This system is the most likely source of X-ray emission coming from these coordinates.
