= AI Phoenicis =

Star in the constellation Phoenix

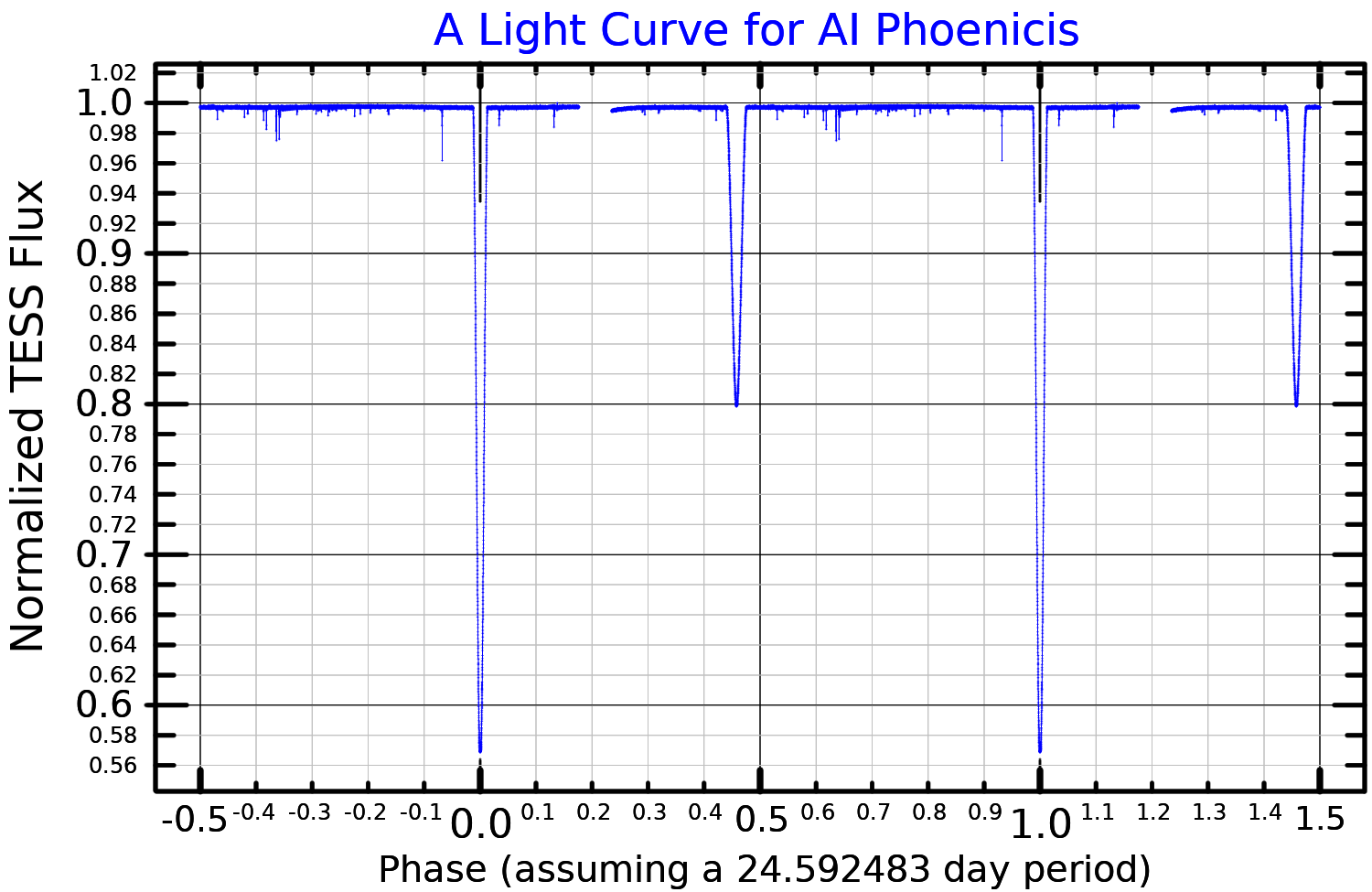
- A light curve for AI Phoenicis, plotted from TESS data

Observation data Epoch J2000 Equinox ICRS
- Constellation: Phoenix
- Right ascension: 01^{h} 09^{m} 34.19^{s}
- Declination: −46° 15′ 56.1″
- Apparent magnitude (V): 8.58 – 9.35

Characteristics
- Spectral type: K0IV + F7V
- Variable type: Algol

Astrometry
Radial velocity (R_{v})	−0.750 ± 0.012 km/s
Proper motion (μ)	RA: +56.27 mas/yr Dec.: +0.70 mas/yr
Parallax (π)	5.8336±0.0262 mas
Distance	559 ± 3 ly (171.4 ± 0.8 pc)
Absolute magnitude (M_{V})	A: 3.29 ± 0.17; B: 3.06 ± 0.13

Orbit
Period (P)	24.592483±0.000017 days
Semi-major axis (a)	47.855±0.019 R_{☉}
Eccentricity (e)	0.1821±0.0051
Inclination (i)	88.502±0.039°
Argument of periastron (ω) (secondary)	110.73±0.78°
Semi-amplitude (K_{1}) (primary)	51.16±0.03 km/s
Semi-amplitude (K_{2}) (secondary)	49.11±0.02 km/s

Details

Primary
Mass	1.2438±0.0008 M_{☉}
Radius	2.9303±0.0023 R_{☉}
Luminosity	4.329±0.063 L_{☉}
Surface gravity (log g)	4.0020±0.0011 cgs
Temperature	5,094±16 K
Metallicity [Fe/H]	−0.14±0.10 dex
Rotational velocity (v sin i)	6±1 km/s
Age	4.62+0.13 −0.06 Gyr

Secondary
Mass	1.1938±0.0008 M_{☉}
Radius	1.8036±0.0022 R_{☉}
Luminosity	5.207±0.065 L_{☉}
Surface gravity (log g)	3.5981±0.0009 cgs
Temperature	6,199±22 K
Metallicity [Fe/H]	−0.14±0.10 dex
Rotational velocity (v sin i)	4±1 km/s
Age	4.62+0.13 −0.06 Gyr

Other designations
- AI Phe, CD−46°322, HD 6980, HIP 5438, SAO 215389

Database references
SIMBAD	data

AI Phoenicis is a variable star in the constellation of Phoenix. An Algol-type eclipsing binary, its apparent magnitude is constant at 8.58 for most of the time, sharply dropping to 9.35 during primary eclipse and to 8.89 during secondary eclipse. The system's variability was discovered by W. Strohmeier in 1972. From parallax measurements by the Gaia spacecraft, the system is located at a distance of 560 light-years (171 parsecs) from Earth, in agreement with earlier estimates based on its luminosity (173 ± 11 parsecs).

The primary star is a K-type subgiant with a spectral type of K0IV and an effective temperature of 5,000 K, while the secondary is an F-type main sequence star with a spectral type of F7V and a temperature of 6,300 K. The primary component, while visually fainter, is slightly more luminous than the secondary due to its higher infrared output. The primary is at the end of its main sequence life and is likely in the short contraction phase known as a hook, where core hydrogen fusion has ceased but shell burning has not yet started, before ascending towards the red giant branch. Photometric and spectroscopic observations have allowed the direct determination of the parameters of the stars with extreme precision, and this system is frequently used to test stellar evolution models. The masses of the stars, 1.247 M_{☉} for the primary and 1.197 M_{☉} for the secondary, are known to a precision of just 0.3%, while the radii of 2.91 R_{☉} and 1.84 R_{☉} have uncertainties of 0.8% and 0.5% respectively. Stellar evolution models show the stars have a common age of about 4.4 billion years.

The orbit of AI Phoenicis has a period of 24.59248 days and a moderate eccentricity of 0.1821 ± 0.0051. The observation of eclipses is allowed by its 88.5° inclination to the plane of the sky. Times of minimum light show the orbital period of the system is not constant, which can be caused by a third star in the system. An analysis of the alignment of the system by the Rossiter–McLaughlin effect suggests that the secondary star rotation axis is not aligned with the orbital axis, with an angle of 87 ± 17° between them, which also indicates interactions with a third star.

Investigations continue with the TESS observatory in 2020.
