= HD 6434 b =

Extrasolar planet orbiting the star HD 6434

HD 6434 b / Eyeke
Discovery
- Discovered by: Mayor et al.
- Discovery date: 7 August 2000
- Detection method: Doppler Spectroscopy

Orbital characteristics
- Semi-major axis: 0.14 AU (21,000,000 km)
- Eccentricity: 0.17±0.03
- Orbital period (sidereal): 21.998±0.009 d 0.060226 y
- Time of periastron: 2,451,490.8 ±0.6
- Argument of periastron: 156±11
- Semi-amplitude: 34.2±1.1
- Star: HD 6434

Physical characteristics
- Mass: >0.39 M_{J} (>120 M_{🜨})

HD 6434 b, formally named Eyeke, is an extrasolar planet orbiting the star HD 6434, formally named Nenque. It has a minimum mass about half that of Jupiter. It orbits the star very close, over 2.5 times as close as Mercury orbits the Sun. For this reason it completes one orbit in only 22 days. Unlike true "hot Jupiters" like 51 Pegasi b, HD 6434 b does not have a circular orbit, but rather an eccentric one.

The planet HD 6434 b is named Eyeke. The name was selected in the NameExoWorlds campaign by Ecuador, during the 100th anniversary of the IAU. Eyeke means near in the language spoken by the Indigenous Waorani tribes.

By studying observations taken by the Hipparcos astrometric mission, a group of scientists proposed that the planet has an inclination of 179.9° (almost exactly face-on) and a mass of 196 Jupiters. If that was the case, the planet would be a red dwarf instead. However, the data was anything but conclusive, and statistically it is extremely unlikely to lie in such a position. But because the inclination is unknown, so is the true mass of the planet. Still, it is very probable that the object is a true planet.

== See also ==
- 94 Ceti b
