= HD 6434 =

Star in the constellation Phoenix

HD 6434 / Nenque
Observation data Epoch J2000.0 Equinox ICRS
- Constellation: Phoenix
- Right ascension: 01^{h} 04^{m} 40.15027^{s}
- Declination: −39° 29′ 17.5842″
- Apparent magnitude (V): 7.71±0.12

Characteristics
- Spectral type: G2/G3V
- B−V color index: 0.61±0.01

Astrometry
Radial velocity (R_{v})	+23.14±0.12 km/s
Proper motion (μ)	RA: −170.033 mas/yr Dec.: −527.946 mas/yr
Parallax (π)	23.6673±0.0251 mas
Distance	137.8 ± 0.1 ly (42.25 ± 0.04 pc)
Absolute magnitude (M_{V})	4.69

Details
Mass	0.83±0.03 M_{☉}
Radius	1.029±0.004 R_{☉}
Luminosity	1.208±0.004 L_{☉}
Surface gravity (log g)	4.31±0.01 cgs
Temperature	5,907±71 K
Metallicity [Fe/H]	−0.48±0.05 dex
Rotation	18.6 d
Rotational velocity (v sin i)	2.2±0.5 km/s
Age	12.2±0.8 Gyr

Other designations
- Nenque, CD−40°239, GJ 9037, HD 6434, HIP 5054, SAO 192911, LFT 102, LHS 1188, LPM 57, LTT 610, GCRV 51158, 2MASS J01044015-3929173

Database references
SIMBAD	data
Exoplanet Archive	data
ARICNS	data

HD 6434, also named Nenque, is a star in the southern constellation of Phoenix. Yellow dwarfs such as this are not very luminous, so at a distance of 138 light-years it is not visible to the unaided eye. However, with binoculars it is readily visible under ideal observing conditions, having an apparent visual magnitude of 7.71. The star is drifting further from the Sun with a radial velocity of +23 km/s. It has one known planet, HD 6434 b.

== Nomenclature ==
The designation HD 6434 comes from the Henry Draper Catalogue.

This was one of the systems selected to be named in the 2019 NameExoWorlds campaign during the 100th anniversary of the IAU, which assigned each country a star and planet to be named. This system was assigned to Ecuador. The approved names were Nenque for the star and Eyeke for the planet; Nenque means the Sun in the language spoken by the Indigenous Waorani people.

== Stellar properties ==
This object is a Sun-like G-type main-sequence star with a stellar classification of G2/G3V. It is an ancient population II star with an estimated age of 12 billion years, and is one of the most metal-deficient stars known to host a planet. This star is spinning at a leisurely rate with a projected rotational velocity of 2.2 km/s. It has 88% of the mass of the Sun but is nearly the same size. HD 6434 is radiating 1.2 times the luminosity of the Sun from its photosphere at an effective temperature of 5,907 K.

HD 6434 is enriched in barium, implying the possible presence of a white dwarf companion that was formerly an asymptotic giant branch star. No white dwarf has been detected by Gaia, but a slight radial velocity trend suggests a possible companion (in addition to the known planet).

== Planetary system ==
In 2000, a planet, designated HD 6434 b, was detected in a close orbit around the star by the radial velocity method. It has a minimum mass about half that of Jupiter. The peer-reviewed scientific paper was published four years later. Its name Eyeke means near in the Waorani language, referring to its proximity to its star.

The HD 6434 planetary system
Companion (in order from star)	Mass	Semimajor axis (AU)	Orbital period (days)	Eccentricity	Inclination (°)	Radius
b / Eyeke	≥0.44±0.01 M_{J}	0.148±0.002	22.0170±0.0008	0.146±0.025	—	—

== See also ==
- 94 Ceti
- List of extrasolar planets
