= WASP-96b =

Gas giant exoplanet targeted for spectroscopy

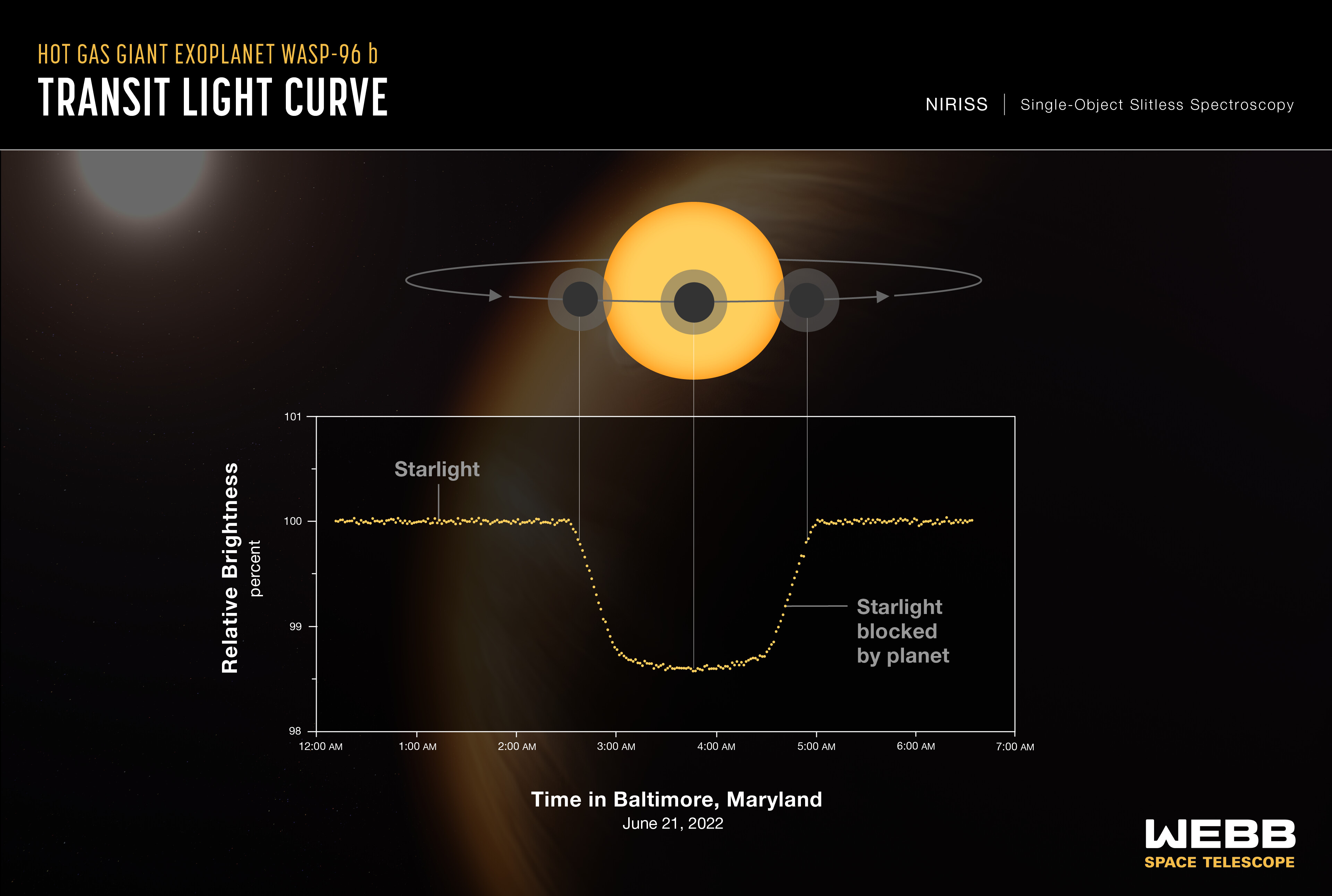
- Light curve of star WASP-96 during transit of WASP-96b, taken by the James Webb Space Telescope

Discovery
- Discovered by: Hellier et al. (WASP)
- Discovery date: October 2013
- Detection method: Transit

Orbital characteristics
- Semi-major axis: 0.0454±0.0013 AU
- Eccentricity: <0.11
- Orbital period (sidereal): 3.4252602(27) d
- Inclination: 85.60°±0.20°
- Semi-amplitude: 64.0+5.3 −4.8 m/s

Physical characteristics
- Mean radius: 1.200±0.060 R_{J}
- Mass: 0.490+0.049 −0.047 M_{J}
- Mean density: 0.352+0.068 −0.059 g/cm^{3}
- Temperature: 1285 K

WASP-96b is a gas giant exoplanet. Its mass is 0.48 times that of Jupiter. It is 0.0453 AU from the class G star WASP-96, which it orbits every 3.4 days. It is about 1,140 light-years away from Earth, in the constellation Phoenix. It was discovered in 2013 by the Wide Angle Search for Planets (WASP).

WASP-96b orbits its Sun-like star WASP-96 every 3.4 Earth days at a distance just one-ninth of the distance between Mercury and the Sun.

The hot-Jupiter exoplanet was found via the transiting method by Coel Hellier et.al. in 2013 as part of the WASP-South survey.

== Atmosphere ==
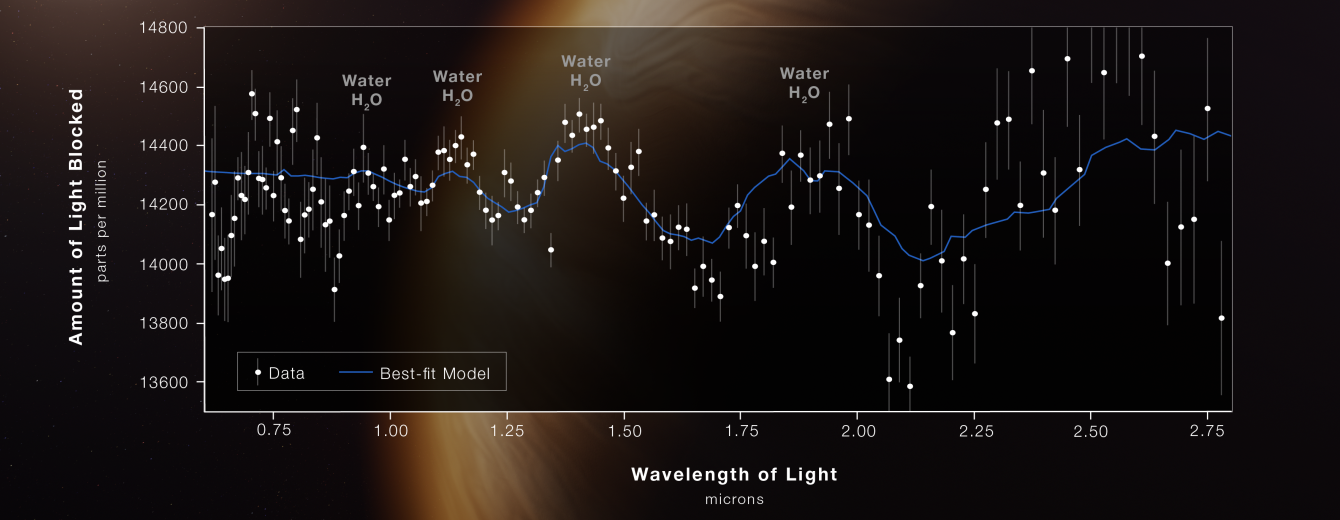
Spectrum of WASP-96b, as captured by the James Webb Space Telescope

WASP-96b's spectrum was one of the images featured in the initial science release from the James Webb Space Telescope in July 2022. The spectrum confirmed the presence of water, as well as providing evidence for "clouds and hazes" within the planet's atmosphere. Prior to this discovery, WASP-96b was thought to be free of clouds.

While the light curve released confirms properties of the planet that had already been determined from other observations – the existence, size, and orbit of the planet – the transmission spectrum revealed previously hidden details of the atmosphere: the unambiguous signature of water, indications of haze, and evidence of clouds that were suspected based on prior observations.

A study in 2023 measured the abundance of certain chemical species in the atmosphere of WASP-96b as seen in the table below. Models of the atmosphere with patchy clouds and hazes best describes the observations through the James Webb Space Telescope.

Chemical Species	log(VMR)	Concentration
Water vapor	-3.59^{+0.35}_{−0.35}	257 ppm
Carbon monoxide	-3.25^{+0.91}_{−5.06}	562 ppm
Carbon dioxide	-4.38^{+0.47}_{−0.57}	41.7 ppm
Sodium	-6.85^{+2.48}_{−3.10}	141 ppb
Potassium	-8.04^{+1.22}_{−1.71}	9.12 ppb

== See also ==
- Wide Angle Search for Planets
- List of exoplanets discovered in 2013
