= HD 8535 =

Star in the constellation Phoenix

Observation data Epoch J2000.0 Equinox ICRS
- Constellation: Phoenix
- Right ascension: 01^{h} 23^{m} 37.23585^{s}
- Declination: −41° 16′ 11.2795″
- Apparent magnitude (V): 7.70

Characteristics
- Evolutionary stage: main sequence
- Spectral type: G0V
- Apparent magnitude (B): 8.22
- Apparent magnitude (J): 6.735
- Apparent magnitude (H): 6.449
- Apparent magnitude (K): 6.354
- B−V color index: 0.553±0.009

Astrometry
Radial velocity (R_{v})	+2.51±0.12 km/s
Proper motion (μ)	RA: +57.795 mas/yr Dec.: −69.879 mas/yr
Parallax (π)	18.0657±0.0181 mas
Distance	180.5 ± 0.2 ly (55.35 ± 0.06 pc)
Absolute magnitude (M_{V})	4.10

Details
Mass	1.17±0.02 M_{☉}
Radius	1.18±0.02 R_{☉}
Luminosity	1.85±0.01 L_{☉}
Surface gravity (log g)	4.36±0.02 cgs
Temperature	6,200±50 K
Metallicity [Fe/H]	0.02 dex
Rotational velocity (v sin i)	3.07 km/s
Age	2.1±0.9 Gyr

Other designations
- CD−41°359, GC 1693, HD 8535, HIP 6511, SAO 215484, PPM 305828

Database references
SIMBAD	data
Exoplanet Archive	data

HD 8535 is a star located 181 light-years (55 parsecs) away from the Sun in the southern constellation of Phoenix. It has a yellow hue and can be viewed using binoculars or a small telescope, having a low apparent visual magnitude of 7.70. The star is drifting further away from the Sun with a radial velocity of +2.5 km/s.

This is an ordinary G-type main-sequence star with a stellar classification of G0V. The luminosity class of 'V' indicates the star is generating energy through core hydrogen fusion. It is about two billion years old and is spinning slowly with a projected rotational velocity of 3 km/s. The abundance of elements other than hydrogen and helium in the star – what astronomers term metallicity – is about the same as in the Sun. It has 17% more mass than the Sun and an 18% greater radius. The star is radiating 1.85 times the luminosity of the Sun from its photosphere at an effective temperature of 6,200 K.

A survey in 2015 has ruled out the existence of any stellar companions at projected distances above 23 astronomical units. However, in 2019 a white dwarf companion to this star was found.

== Planetary system ==
In 2009, a gas giant was found in orbit around the star using the radial velocity method. It has an orbital period of 3.59 years and has at least 68% of the mass of Jupiter.

The HD 8535 planetary system
Companion (in order from star)	Mass	Semimajor axis (AU)	Orbital period (days)	Eccentricity	Inclination (°)	Radius
b	≥ 0.68+0.07 −0.04 M_{J}	2.45+0.04 −0.06	1,313±28	0.15+0.09 −0.05	—	—

== See also ==
- List of extrasolar planets
