= WASP-3b =

Hot Jupiter

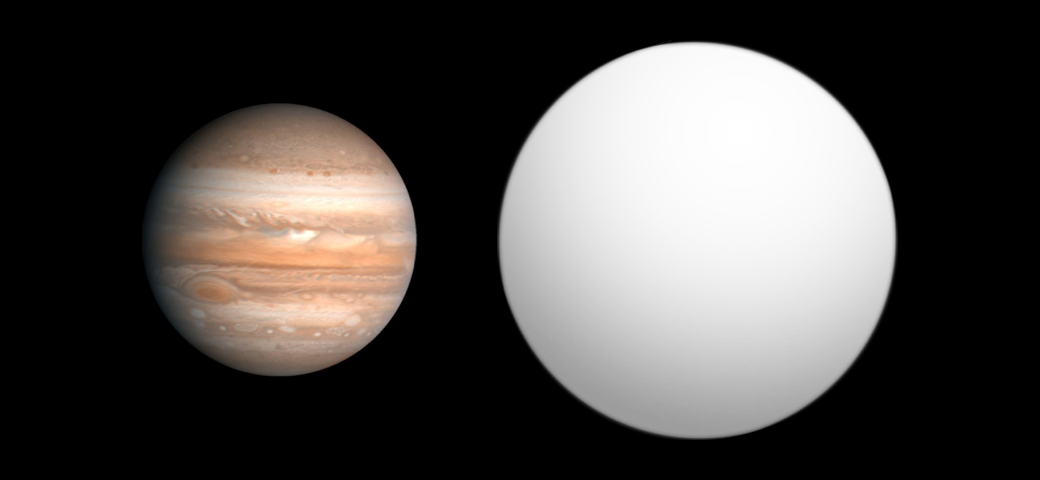
- Size comparison of WASP-3b with Jupiter.

Discovery
- Discovered by: Pollacco et al. (SuperWASP)
- Discovery site: ORM
- Discovery date: October 31, 2007
- Detection method: Transit

Orbital characteristics
- Semi-major axis: 0.0317^{+0.0006}_{−0.001} AU
- Eccentricity: 0
- Orbital period (sidereal): 1.8468372 ± 6e-07 d
- Inclination: 85.06^{+0.15}_{−0.16}
- Star: WASP-3

Physical characteristics
- Mean radius: 1.454 ± 0.084 R_{J}
- Mass: 2.06 ± 0.13 M_{J}
- Mean density: 1.04 g/cm^{3}
- Surface gravity: 23.44 m/s^{2}; 2.390 g_{0}
- Temperature: 1,983 K (1,710 °C)

WASP-3b is an extrasolar planet orbiting the star WASP-3 located approximately 800 light-years away in the constellation Lyra. It was discovered via the transit method by SuperWASP, and follow up radial velocity observations confirmed that WASP-3b is a planet. The planet's mass and radius indicate that it is a gas giant with a similar bulk composition to Jupiter. WASP-3b has such an orbital distance around its star to classify it in the class of planets known as hot Jupiters and has an atmospheric temperature of approximately 1983 K.

WASP-3b undergoes no detectable gravitational tugging from other bodies in this system.

The study in 2012, utilizing a Rossiter–McLaughlin effect, have determined the planetary orbit is probably aligned with the equatorial plane of the star, misalignment equal to 3.3^{+2.5}_{−4.4}°.

== See also ==
- Wide Angle Search for Planets
