= WASP-4b =

Extrasolar planet in the constellation Phoenix

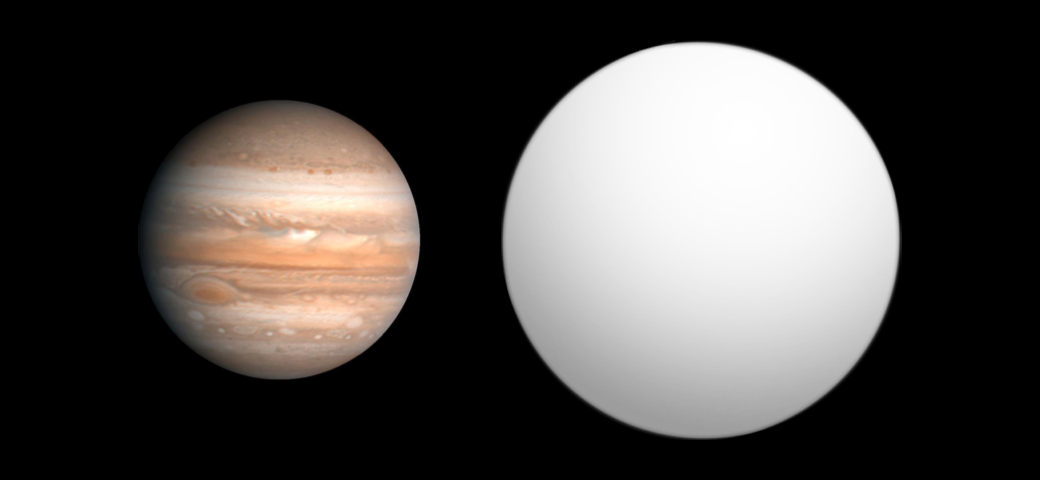
- Size comparison of WASP-4b with Jupiter

Discovery
- Discovered by: Wide Angle Search for Planets
- Discovery site: South African Astronomical Observatory
- Discovery date: October 31, 2007
- Detection method: Transit photometry

Orbital characteristics
- Semi-major axis: 0.02239±0.00084 AU
- Eccentricity: <0.0033
- Orbital period (sidereal): 1.338231587(22) d
- Inclination: 88.02°±0.69°
- Semi-amplitude: 232.7+2.5 −2.2 m/s
- Star: WASP-4

Physical characteristics
- Mean radius: 1.312±0.045 R_{J}
- Mass: 1.164±0.082 M_{J}
- Mean density: 0.639±0.079 g/cm^{3}
- Temperature: 1,957±68 K (1,684 °C; 3,063 °F)

WASP-4b is an exoplanet, specifically a hot Jupiter, approximately 891 light-years away in the constellation of Phoenix.

== Discovery ==
The planet was the discovered by the Wide Angle Search for Planets team using images taken with the SuperWASP-South project's eight wide-angle cameras located at the South African Astronomical Observatory. Analysis of over 4,000 images taken between May and November 2006 resulted in the detection of a transit occurring every 1.3 days. Follow-up radial velocity observations using the Swiss 1.2-metre Leonhard Euler Telescope confirmed that the transiting object was a planet.

The radial velocity trend of WASP-4, caused by the presence of WASP-4 b

== Characteristics ==
The planetary equilibrium temperature would be 1,650±30 K, but the measured dayside temperature is higher, with a 2015 study finding 1,900±100 K and a 2020 study finding 1,957±68 K.

A study in 2012, utilizing the Rossiter–McLaughlin effect, determined the planetary orbit is probably aligned with the equatorial plane of the star, with misalignment equal to -1^{+14}_{−12}°.

The planet's orbital period appeared to be decreasing at a rate of 7.33±0.71 milliseconds per year, suggesting that its orbit is decaying with a decay timescale of 15.77±1.57 million years. The anomalously high rate of orbital decay of WASP-4b was poorly understood as of 2021. The orbital decay thought to be primarily driven by tidal interactions between the planet and its host star. However, in late 2025 it was determined that WASP-4b is not undergoing any orbital decay; all the data used to support it is instead explained by the light travel time effect of the wider-orbit planet WASP-4c.
