= Zeeman–Doppler imaging =

Investigative astrophysics technique

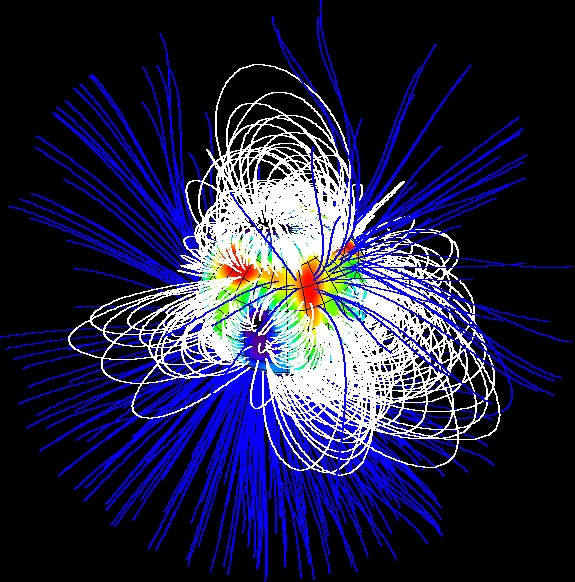
Surface magnetic field of SU Aur (a young star of T Tauri type), reconstructed by means of Zeeman–Doppler Imaging

In astrophysics, Zeeman–Doppler imaging is a tomographic technique dedicated to the cartography of stellar magnetic fields, as well as surface brightness or spots and temperature distributions.

This method makes use of the ability of magnetic fields to polarize the light emitted (or absorbed) in spectral lines formed in the stellar atmosphere (the Zeeman effect). The periodic modulation of Zeeman signatures during the stellar rotation is employed to make an iterative reconstruction of the vectorial magnetic field at stellar surface.

The method was first proposed by Marsh and Horne in 1988, as a way to interpret the emission line variations of cataclysmic variable stars. This techniques is based on the principle of maximum entropy image reconstruction; it yields the simplest magnetic field geometry (as a spherical harmonics expansion) among the various solutions compatible with the data.

This technique is the first to enable the reconstruction of the vectorial magnetic geometry of stars similar to the Sun. It now enables systematic studies of stellar magnetism and provides insights into the geometry of large arches formed by magnetic fields above stellar surfaces. To collect the observations related to Zeeman-Doppler Imaging, astronomers use stellar spectropolarimeters like ESPaDOnS at CFHT on Mauna Kea (Hawaii), HARPSpol at the ESO's 3.6m telescope (La Silla Observatory, Chile), as well as NARVAL at Bernard Lyot Telescope (Pic du Midi de Bigorre, France).

The technique is very reliable, as the reconstruction of the magnetic field maps with different algorithms yield almost identical results, even with poorly sampled data sets. It makes use of high-resolution time-series spectropolarimetric observations (Stokes parameter spectra). It has however been shown, from both numerical simulations and observations, that the magnetic field strength and complexity is underestimated if no linear polarization spectra is available from observations. Since linear polarization signatures are weaker compared circular polarization their detections are not as reliable, particularly for cool stars. Therefore, the observations are normally limited to only Stokes IV parameters. With more modern spectropolarimeters such as the recently installed SPIRou at CFHT and CRIRES+ at the Very Large Telescope (Chile) the sensitivity to linear polarization will increase, allowing for more detailed studies of cool stars in the future.
