= Starspot =

Stellar phenomenon

Starspots are stellar phenomena, so-named by analogy with sunspots. Spots as small as sunspots have not been detected on other stars, as they would cause undetectably small fluctuations in brightness. The commonly observed starspots are in general much larger than those on the Sun: up to about 30% of the stellar surface may be covered, corresponding to starspots 100 times larger than those on the Sun.

== Detection and measurements ==
To detect and measure the extent of starspots one uses several types of methods.

- For rapidly rotating stars – Doppler imaging and Zeeman-Doppler imaging. With the Zeeman-Doppler imaging technique the direction of the magnetic field on stars can be determined since spectral lines are split according to the Zeeman effect, revealing the direction and magnitude of the field.
- For slowly rotating stars – Line Depth Ratio (LDR). Here one measures two different spectral lines, one sensitive to temperature and one which is not. Since starspots have a lower temperature than their surroundings the temperature-sensitive line changes its depth. From the difference between these two lines the temperature and size of the spot can be calculated, with a temperature accuracy of 10K.
- For eclipsing binary stars – Eclipse mapping produces images and maps of spots on both stars.
- For giant binary stars – Very-long-baseline interferometry
- For stars with transiting extrasolar planets – Light curve variations.

== Temperature ==
Observed starspots have a temperature which is in general 500–2000 kelvins cooler than the stellar photosphere. This temperature difference could give rise to a brightness variation up to 0.6 magnitudes between the spot and the surrounding surface. There also seems to be a relation between the spot temperature and the temperature for the stellar photosphere, indicating that starspots behave similarly for different types of stars (observed in G–K dwarfs).

== Lifetimes ==
The lifetime for a starspot depends on its size.

- For small spots the lifetime is proportional to their size, similar to spots on the Sun.
- For large spots the sizes depend on the differential rotation of the star, but there are some indications that large spots which give rise to light variations can survive for many years even in stars with differential rotation.

== Activity cycles ==
The distribution of starspots across the stellar surface varies analogous to the solar case, but differs for different types of stars, e.g., depending on whether the star is a binary or not. The same type of activity cycles that are found for the Sun can be seen for other stars, corresponding to the solar (2 times) 11-year cycle.

=== Maunder minimum ===
Some stars may have longer cycles, possibly analogous to the Maunder minimum for the Sun which lasted 70 years, for example some Maunder minimum candidates are 51 Pegasi, HD 4915 and HD 166620.

=== Flip-flop cycles ===
Another activity cycle is the so-called flip-flop cycle, which implies that the activity on either hemisphere shifts from one side to the other. The same phenomena can be seen on the Sun, with periods of 3.8 and 3.65 years for the northern and southern hemispheres. Flip-flop phenomena are observed for both binary RS CVn stars and single stars although the extent of the cycles are different between binary and singular stars.
