= Eta Phoenicis =

Star in the constellation Phoenix

η Phoenicis
- Location of η Phoenicis (circled)

Observation data Epoch J2000 Equinox ICRS
- Constellation: Phoenix
- Right ascension: 00^{h} 43^{m} 21.23841^{s}
- Declination: −57° 27′ 47.0073″
- Apparent magnitude (V): 4.36

Characteristics
- Spectral type: A0IV
- U−B color index: -0.02
- B−V color index: +0.00

Astrometry
Radial velocity (R_{v})	+7.70 km/s
Proper motion (μ)	RA: -5.07 mas/yr Dec.: +16.51 mas/yr
Parallax (π)	13.24±0.34 mas
Distance	246 ± 6 ly (76 ± 2 pc)
Absolute magnitude (M_{V})	-0.03

Details
Mass	2.93 M_{☉}
Luminosity	120 L_{☉}
Surface gravity (log g)	3.85 cgs
Temperature	9,822 K
Metallicity [Fe/H]	0.00 dex
Rotational velocity (v sin i)	124 km/s

Other designations
- CCDM J00434-5728A, FK5 23, GC 866, HIP 3405, HR 191, HD 4150, SAO 232162, WDS J00434-5728A

Database references
SIMBAD	data

Eta Phoenicis (η Phe) is a class A0IV (white subgiant) star in the constellation Phoenix. Its apparent magnitude is 4.36 and it is approximately 246 light years away based on parallax.

Eta Phoenicis has two reported companions; in addition to a distant secondary, B, at magnitude 11.5 and separation 20", the primary has a reported companion Ab with an estimated separation of 6.8 AU, a period slightly longer than 10 years, a magnitude of 8.5, and a spectral type around G5V. The primary is surrounded by an orbiting debris disk.
