= WASP-4 =

G-type main-sequence star in the constellation Phoenix

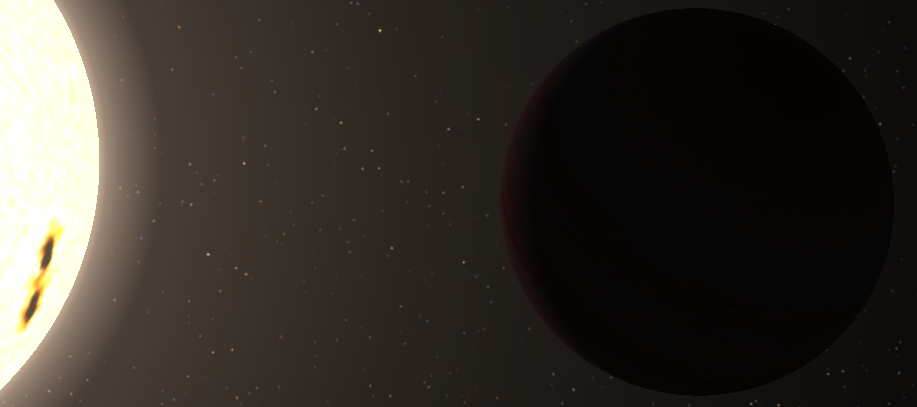
- Artistic rendering of WASP-4 b

Observation data Epoch J2000.0 Equinox ICRS
- Constellation: Phoenix
- Right ascension: 23^{h} 34^{m} 15.0857^{s}
- Declination: −42° 03′ 41.048″
- Apparent magnitude (V): 12.468±0.025

Characteristics
- Evolutionary stage: Main sequence
- Spectral type: G7V
- Apparent magnitude (V): 12.468±0.025
- Apparent magnitude (B): 13.216±0.020
- Variable type: Planetary transit variable

Astrometry
Radial velocity (R_{v})	57.61±0.76 km/s
Proper motion (μ)	RA: 9.950(12) mas/yr Dec.: −87.620(10) mas/yr
Parallax (π)	3.6623±0.0147 mas
Distance	891 ± 4 ly (273 ± 1 pc)

Details
Mass	0.899+0.033 −0.031 M_{☉}
Radius	0.9150+0.0089 −0.0091 R_{☉}
Surface gravity (log g)	4.472+0.013 −0.012 cgs
Temperature	5,488+29 −28 K
Metallicity [Fe/H]	−0.05±0.04 dex
Rotation	22.2±3.3 days
Rotational velocity (v sin i)	2.2+0.6 −1.0 km/s
Age	7.0±2.9 Gyr

Other designations
- 1SWASP J233415.06-420341.1, TOI-232, TIC 402026209, WASP-4, TYC 8017-108-1, 2MASS J23341508-4203411

Database references
SIMBAD	data
Exoplanet Archive	data

WASP-4 is a G-type main-sequence star approximately 891 light-years away in the constellation of Phoenix. Despite its advanced age, the star is rotating rapidly, being spun up by the tides raised by a giant planet on a close orbit.

== Planetary system ==
In 2007 the exoplanet WASP-4b was discovered orbiting this star. With an orbital period of just 1.3 days, it is classified as a hot Jupiter. The planet's orbital period appears to be decreasing at a rate of 7.33±0.71 milliseconds per year, suggesting that its orbit is decaying, with a decay timescale of 15.77±1.57 million years. Another superjovian planet in the system has been suspected. A 2025 study further supported orbital decay for WASP-4b, but another same-year study discounted this, attributing all evidence for orbital decay to the light travel time effect of an outer planet. Although the previous candidate has not been addressed, this planet has nearly the same orbital elements and thus both should be the same object.

The WASP-4 planetary system
Companion (in order from star)	Mass	Semimajor axis (AU)	Orbital period (days)	Eccentricity	Inclination (°)	Radius
b	1.196±0.030 M_{J}	0.02294+0.00028 −0.00026	1.338231350(83)	0.0013+0.0005 −0.0009	88.05+0.85 −0.53	1.349+0.011 −0.012 R_{J}
c	≥9.3±1.7 M_{J}	7.96+0.72 −0.32	10,600+1,100 −1,000	0.040+0.057 −0.028	—	—

== See also ==
- Wide Angle Search for Planets
- Lists of planets
