= List of directly imaged exoplanets =

Exoplanets confirmed or discovered from direct imaging

Motion interpolation of seven images of the HR 8799 system taken from the W. M. Keck Observatory over seven years, featuring four exoplanets

This is a list of extrasolar planets that have been directly observed, sorted by observed separations. This method works best for young planets that emit infrared light and are far from the glare of the star. Currently, this list includes both directly imaged planets and imaged planetary-mass companions (objects that orbit a star but formed through a binary-star-formation process, not a planet-formation process). This list does not, due to the inherent gray area between such objects and brown dwarfs, include free-floating planetary-mass objects in star-forming regions or young associations, which are also referred to as rogue planets.

The data given for each planet is taken from the latest published paper on the planet to have that data. In many cases it is not possible to have an exact value, and an estimated range is instead provided. The coldest and oldest planet directly imaged are Epsilon Indi Ab and 14 Herculis c, which have six times Jupiter's mass, an effective temperature of 275 K, an age of about 3.5 Ga and eight times Jupiter's mass, an effective temperature of 275 K, an age of about 4.6 Ga, respectively. This list includes the four members of the multi-planet system that orbit HR 8799.

It is unlikely or at least unclear if objects on a wide orbit (≥100 AU) formed in circumstellar disks and these objects are therefore more often referred as planetary-mass companions. Only in rare cases, such as for HD 106906 b, the formation of the object in the disk is seen plausible.

== Key ==
Exoplanets have been discovered using several different methods for collecting or combining direct images to isolate planets from the background light of their star. Non-Redundant Aperture Masking Interferometry is a method of combining the views of multiple telescopes into a single image, while the other methods are algorithms for combining multiple direct images taken from the same telescope.

- ADI = Angular Differential Imaging
- KLIP = Karhunen–Loève Image Processing
- LOCI = Locally Optimized Combination of Images
- NRM = Non-Redundant Aperture Masking Interferometry
- RSDI = Reference Star Differential Imaging
- SDI = Spectral Differential Imaging
- TLOCI = Template Locally Optimized Combination of Images

== Exoplanets ==
Although listed in the table below, the identities of Alpha Centauri candidate 1, FW Tau b, 2MASS J044144 b, CVSO 30 c and HD 100546 b are disputed. They may not actually be true exoplanets. † There is no consensus whether these companions of stars should be considered sub-brown dwarfs or planets Check https://exoplanetarchive.ipac.caltech.edu/docs/imaging.html to see more directly imaged planets. It contains an updated table of all of them.

| Star | Exoplanet | Image | Mass (M_{J}) | Radius (R_{J}) | Period (yr) | Observed separation (AU) | Eccentricity | Distance to Earth (ly) | Year of imaging confirmation | Year of discovery | Year of first image | Imaging technique | Ref(s). |
|---|---|---|---|---|---|---|---|---|---|---|---|---|---|
| WISE 0146+4234 | WISE 0146+4234 B† | | 10 ±4 | | 10 | 0.93+0.12 −0.16 | | 63 | 2015 | | | AO | |
| WISE J0336-0143 | WISE J0336-0143 B† | | 4–12.5 | | 5–9 | 0.97+0.05 −0.09 | | 32.7 ± 0.7 | 2023 | 2023 | 2022 | source subtraction | |
| Alpha Centauri A | Alpha Centauri Ab (?) | | 0.11±0.05 | 0.459±0.17 | ~1 | 1.1 | | 4.37 | 2021 | | | | |
| CFBDSIR J145829+101343 | CFBDSIR J145829+101343 b | | 10.5±4.5 | | 27.5±7.5 | 2.6±0.3 | | 104 ± 8 | 2011 | 2011 | 2010 | Direct imaging | |
| HD 206893 | HD 206893 c | | 12.7+1.2 −1.0 | 1.46+0.18 −0.06 | 5.7 | 3.53+0.08 −0.06 | 0.41±0.03 | 133.0 ± 0.2 | 2023 | 2023 | 2021 | interferometry | |
| HD 206893 | HD 206893 B† | | 28.0+2.2 −2.1 | 1.25±0.02 | 26 | 9.6+0.4 −0.3 | 0.14±0.05 | 133.0 ± 0.2 | 2016 | 2016 | 2015 | ADI, PCA | |
| WISE 1217+1626 | WISE 1217+1626 A b | | 22 ± 2 | 0.934 ± 0.029 | 130–210 | 8.0 ± 1.3 | | 30.4 ± 1.0 | | 2012 | 2012 | Direct imaging | |
| AF Leporis | AF Lep b | | 3.74+0.53 −0.50 | 1.30 ± 0.15 | 24.38+1.1 −0.41 | 9.01+0.20 −0.19 | 0.031+0.027 −0.020 | 87.55 ± 0.05 | 2023 | 2023 | 2011 | Direct imaging | |
| Beta Pictoris | Beta Pictoris b | | 12.7±0.3 | 1.46±0.01 | 22.47+3.77 −2.26 | 10.018+0.082 −0.076 | 0.08+0.09 −0.05 | 63.4±0.1 | 2010 | 2008 | 2003 | RSDI | |
| Beta Pictoris | Beta Pictoris d | | 2.4±0.6 | 1.26±0.03 | 91+18 −27 | 26.0+2.2 −6.1 | <0.44 | 63.4±0.1 | 2026 | 2026 | 2014 | Direct Imaging, Spectral Template Matching | |
| 51 Eridani | 51 Eridani b | | 9.1+4.9 −3.3 | 1.11+0.16 −0.14 | 32+17 −9 | 12+4 −2 | 0.45+0.10 −0.15 | 96.0 ± 1.0 | 2015 | 2015 | 2014 | ADI, KLIP | |
| RX J0534.0-0221 | RX J0534.0-0221 b | | 2.8±0.5 | 1.28±0.01 | ~70 | 14 | 0.4 | 112 | 2026 | 2026 | 2024 | coronagraph | |
| HR 8799 | HR 8799 e | | 9.6+1.9 −1.8 | 1.17+0.13 −0.11 | 49 | 14.5 | 0.14 | 133.3 ± 0.2 | 2010 | 2010 | 2009 | ADI, LOCI | |
| HR 8799 | HR 8799 d | | 9.2 ± 0.1 | 1.2 ± 0.1 | 100 | 24.5 | 0.09 | 133.3 ± 0.2 | 2008 | 2008 | 2008 | ADI, LOCI | |
| HR 8799 | HR 8799 c | | 8.5 ± 0.4 | 1.2 ± 0.1 | 189 | 37.4 | 0.24 | 133.3 ± 0.2 | 2008 | 2008 | 2004/ 2007 | ADI, LOCI | |
| HR 8799 | HR 8799 b | | 6.0 ± 0.3 | 1.2 ± 0.1 | 474 | 69.2 | 0.17 | 133.3 ± 0.2 | 2008 | 2008 | 2004/ 2007 | ADI, LOCI | |
| 2M J044144 | 2M J044144 b† | | 9.8 ± 1.8 | | | 15 ± 0.6 | | 400 ± 10 | 2010 | 2010 | 2008 | Direct imaging | |
| WISE 1711+3500 | WISE 1711+3500 B† | | 8.1-26 | | 280–430 | 15 ± 2 | | 75 ± 3 | | 2012 | 2012 | laser AO | |
| TYC 5709-354-1 | WISPIT 2c | | 8–12 | 0.91-2.2 | | 15 | | 437 ± 1 | 2026 | 2025 | 2025 | Direct imaging/ Interferometry | |
| TYC 5709-354-1 | WISPIT 2b | | 5.3 ± 1.0 | 1.6 ± 0.2 | | 54 | | 437 ± 1 | 2025 | 2025 | 2023 | Direct imaging | |
| 29 Cygni | HIP 99770 b | | 17+6 −5 | 1.5 ± 0.3 | 51.0+17.0 −7.8 | 15.8+1.7 −1.0 | 0.31+0.06 −0.12 | 132.9 ± 0.4 | 2023 | 2022 | 2021 | ALOCI | |
| HD 135344A | HD 135344Ab | | 10.0+1.4 −1.9 | 1.45+0.06 −0.03 – 1.60+0.07 −0.06 | | 16.5+2.8 −2.0 | 0.5±0.2 | 440 ± 1 | 2025 | 2025 | 2019 | coronagraph and interferometry | |
| 14 Herculis | 14 Herculis c | | 7.9+1.6 −1.2 | 1.03 ± 0.01 | 143 ± 3 | 20.0+12.0 −4.9 | 0.52+0.16 −0.12 | 58.38 ± 0.03 | 2025 | 2006 (RV) | 2024 | coronagraph | |
| HR 2562 | HR 2562 B† | | 8-18.5 | 1.11±0.11 | | 20.3±0.3 | | 111 | 2016 | | | Direct imaging | |
| PDS 70 | PDS 70 b | | 6+6 −4 | 1.96+0.20 −0.17 | 123.5+9.8 −4.9 | 20.7+1.4 −1.2 | 0.16+0.12 −0.01 | 366.6 ± 0.8 | 2018 | 2018 | 2012/ 2016 | ADI, TLOCI | |
| PDS 70 | PDS 70 c | | 9+9 −6 | 1.98+0.39 −0.31 | 191.5+15.8 −31.5 | 33.9+1.7 −2.1 | 0.042+0.027 −0.030 | 366.6 ± 0.8 | 2019 | 2019 | 2016/ 2018 | SDI | |
| HIP 81208 C | HIP 81208 Cb† | | 14.8±0.4 | | 285.00+293.67 −112.07 | 23.04+13.88 −6.55 | 0.23+0.13 −0.15 | 477 ± 3 | 2023 | 2023 | 2019 | PACO ASDI | |
| HIP 54515 | HIP 54515 b | | 17.7+7.6 −4.9 | 1.08±0.23 | 89+41 −24 | 24.8+7.2 −4.7 | 0.42+0.13 −0.14 | 271.4 | 2025 | 2025 | 2022 | Coronagraph, spectroscopy, astrometry | |
| Epsilon Indi A | Epsilon Indi Ab | | 7.29+0.60 −0.61 | 1.08 (Note: Calculated, using the Stefan-Boltzmann law and the planet's effective temperature and luminosity, with respect to the solar nominal effective temperature of 5,772 K: $$\sqrt{\biggl(\frac{5,772}{275}\biggr)^4 \cdot 10^{-7.2}} = 0.1106\ R_\odot.$$) | 180+32 −31 | 28.4+10 −7.2 | 0.40 | 11.867 ± 0.004 | 2024 | 2019 (RV)/ 2002 (RV) | 2019/ 2023 | coronagraphic images | |
| HD 169142 | HD 169142 b | | 3 ± 2 | | | 37.2 | | 375 ± 1 | 2023 | 2019 | 2015 | pseudo-ADI, PDI, ASDI, ADI | |
| 59 Virginis | Gliese 504 b† | | 1–17 | 1.08+0.04 −0.03 | | 43.5 | | 57.4 ± 0.1 | 2013 | 2013 | 2011 | ADI, LOCI | |
| 2M1207 | 2M1207b † | | 5.5 ± 0.5 | 1.13 | >2029 | ≥49.8 ± 1.1 | | 211 ± 2 | 2005 | 2004 | 2004 | Direct imaging | |
| CE Antliae | TWA 7b | | 0.3 | | 550 | 52 | | 111.2 ± 0.1 | | 2025 | 2024 | Direct imaging | |
| 2MASS J01225093-2439505 | 2MASS J01225093-2439505 b† | | 24.5±2.5 | 1.0 | | 52 | | 110 | 2013 | | | Direct imaging | |
| KR Muscae | HD 100546 b† | | 1.65-25 | 3.4 | | 53 ± 2 | | 353 ± 1 | | 2013 | 2011 | Direct imaging | |
| Elias 2-24 | Elias 2-24 b | | 1.9-4.0 | | | 54.9±4.3 | | 454 | 2026 | 2021 | 2018 | coronagraph | |
| Kappa Andromedae | Kappa Andromedae b† | | 13^{+12}_{−2} | | 242–900 | 55 | 0.69–0.85 | 168.0 | 2013 | | | ADI, LOCI | |
| HD 95086 | HD 95086 b | | 5.0 | | ? | 56 | ? | 295 | 2013 | | | ADI, LOCI | |
| HD 143811AB | HD 143811 AB b | | 6.1+0.7 −0.9 | | 319+248 −86 | 63+30 −12 | 0.19±0.12 | 446±1 | 2025 | 2025 | 2016 | Coronagraphic imaging | |
| Delorme 1 (AB) | Delorme 1 (AB) b† | | 12-14 | | | 84 | | 154 | 2013 | | | AO | |
| HIP 65426 | HIP 65426 b | | 6-12 | 1.5 | 600 | 92 | | 363 | 2017 | | | ADI, TLOCI | |
| AB Aurigae | AB Aurigae b† | | 9-20 | <2.75 | | 93 | 0.19-0.60 | 509 ± 3 | 2022 | 2022 | 2007/ 2016 | ADI/RSDI, ALOCI | |
| MWC 758 | MWC 758 c | | | | | 100 | | 508 ± 2 | | 2019 | 2016 | Direct imaging | |
| GQ Lupi | GQ Lupi b† | | 1–36 | 3.7 | | 114 ± 33 | | 495 ± 4 | 2005 | 2004 | 1994/ 1999 | Direct imaging | |
| 2MASS J04372171+2651014 | 2M0437 b | | 3-5 | | | 118 | | 418 | 2021 | | | AO | |
| ROXs 42B | ROXs 42Bb† | | 10+8 −4 | 2.10 ± 0.35 | 1968 | 157 | | 440 ± 16 | 2013 | 2005 | 2001/ 2011 | Speckle Imaging & Direct imaging | |
| 2MASS J02192210-3925225 | 2MASS J02192210-3925225 b† | | 13.9±1.1 | 1.44±0.03 | | 160 | | 131 | 2015 | | | Direct imaging | |
| TYC 8998-760-1 | TYC 8998-760-1 b † | | 14±3 | | | 160 | | 309 | 2020 | | | imaging + coronagraph | |
| TYC 8998-760-1 | TYC 8998-760-1 c | | 6±1 | | | 320 | | 309 | 2020 | | | imaging + coronagraph | |
| NIRISS-NGC1333-10 | NIRISS-NGC1333-10 B† | | ~15 | | | 164 | | 978 | | 2024 | 2023 | direct imaging +slitless spectroscopy | |
| 2MASS J16262785−2625152 | KOINTREAU-4b† | | 11.5+1.2 −1.6 or 15.3+0.7 −0.8 | | | 182±2 | | 462.6±3.2 | | 2026 | 2022 | Direct imaging | |
| AB Pictoris | AB Pictoris b† | | 10±1 | 1.57 – 1.8 | | 190 | | 163.5 ± 0.1 | 2005 | 2005 | 2003 | Imaging+ coronagraph | |
| CFHTWIR-Oph 98 | CFHTWIR-Oph 98 b† | | 7.8+0.7 −0.8 | 1.86±0.05 | ~22000 | 200±6 | | 447 | 2021 | | | Direct imaging | |
| CHXR 73 | CHXR 73 b† | | 12.6+8.4 −5.2 | | | 210 | | 620 ± 20 | | 2006 | 2005 | Direct imaging | |
| ROXs 12 | ROXs 12 b† | | 16±4 | | | 214 | 0.83 | 452 | 2013 | | | Direct imaging | |
| 2MASS J22362452+4751425 | 2M2236+4751 b† | | 11–14 | | | 230 | | 205 | 2017 | | | AO | |
| Mu2 Scorpii | Mu2 Scorpii b†l | | 14.4±0.8 | | | 242.4 | 0.56 | 474 | 2022 | | | Direct imaging | |
| Ophiuchi 11 | Ophiuchi 11 b† | | 21 ± 3 | | 20000 | 243 ± 55 | | 430 ± 20 | 2006 | 2006 | 2005 | Direct imaging | |
| GSC 6214-00210 | GSC 6214-00210 b† | | 17 ± 3 | 1.91 ± 0.07 | | 320 | | 355 | 2011 | 2008 | 2007 | NRM | |
| FW Tauri | FW Tauri b† | | 10±4 or star | | ~12000 | 330 | ? | 472.93 | 2013 | | | Direct imaging | |
| DH Tauri | DH Tauri b† | | 11 ± 3 | 2.7 ± 0.8 | | 330 | | 441 ± 4 | 2005 | 2004 | 1999 | Coronagraph, AO | |
| 1RXS J1609 | 1RXS 1609 b† | | 14+2 −3 | 1.7 | 6518 | 331.1 | 0.08 | 450 ± 1 | 2010 | 2008 | 2008 | Direct imaging | |
| WISPIT 1AB | WISPIT 1b | | 10.4+1.1 −0.8 | | | 338 | | 746 | 2025 | 2025 | 2022 | Direct imaging | |
| WISPIT 1AB | WISPIT 1c | | 5.3+1.1 −0.6 | | | 840 | | 746 | 2025 | 2025 | 2022 | Direct imaging | |
| ISO-Oph 96 | KOINTREAU-3b | | 3.4±0.7 or 7.5+0.9 −1.0 | | | 342±4 | | 449.3±5.0 | | 2026 | 2022 | Direct imaging | |
| HIP 79098 AB | HIP 79098 AB b† | | 20.5±4.5 | | | 345±6 | | 500 | 2019 | | | Direct imaging | |
| VHS 1256-1257 | VHS 1256 b † | | 16 ± 1 / 12.0 ± 0.1 | 1.22 / 1.30 | 16000+7000 −10000 | 350+110 −150 | 0.68+0.11 −0.10 | 69.0 ± 0.7 | 2015 | 2015 | 2011 | Direct imaging | |
| HD 203030 | HD 203030 B† | | 11+4 −3 | 1.27+0.06 −0.04 | | 487 | | 128.2 ± 0.3 | 2006 | 2006 | 2002 | SDI | |
| CT Chamaeleontis | CT Chamaeleontis b† | | 17±6 | 2.20+0.81 −0.60 | | 507 | | 625 ± 3 | 2008 | 2007 | 2006 | Direct imaging | |
| b Centauri | b Centauri b | | 10.9±1.6 | | | 556 | | 330 | 2021 | | | coronagraph+ classical angular differential imaging | |
| HD 106906 | HD 106906 b | | 11±2 | | | 650 | | 300 | 2013 | | | ADI | |
| CVSO 30 | CVSO 30 c† | | 4.7+5.5 −2.0 | 1.63+0.87 −0.34 | 27000 | 660 | | 1140 ± 30 | | 2016 | 2010 | Direct imaging | |
| USco CTIO 108 | USco CTIO 108 b† | | 16±2 | | | 670 | | 473 ± 6 | | 2007 | 2007 | Direct imaging | |
| XEST 17-036 | KOINTREAU-1b† | | 10.6+2.5 −2.3 | | | 690 | | 519 ± 10 | | 2025 | 2005 | Direct imaging | |
| 2MASS J23225240-6151114 | 2MASS J23225299-6151275† | | 12.6-13.3 | | | 705 | | 138.4 | 2014 | | | Direct imaging | |
| FU Tauri | FU Tauri b† | | 19 ± 4 | 3.2 ± 0.3 | | 719 | | 429 ± 8 | 2009 | 2008 | 2007 | Direct imaging | |
| 2M1006(ABC) | 2M1006(ABC) b† | | 3–5 | | | 730 ± 10 | | 444 | | 2025 | 2018 | Direct imaging (candidate) | |
| HIP 78530 | HIP 78530 b† | | 28 ± 10 | 1.83+0.16 −0.14 | 12000 | 740 ± 60 | | 445.8+4.87 −4.77 | 2011 | 2010 | 2000/ 2008 | Direct imaging | |
| HN Pegasi | HN Pegasi b† | | 22 ± 9.4 | 1.05+0.14 −0.06 | | 795 ± 15.0 | | 59.14 ± 0.04 | 2007 | 2006 | 2006 | Direct imaging | |
| SR 12 | SR 12(AB) c† | | 11 ± 3 | 2.38+0.27 −0.32 | | 980 | | 370 ± 20 | 2011 | 2011 | 1998/ 2002 | Direct imaging | |
| 2MASS J05581644–4501559 | 2MASS J0558 B† | | 6–12 | | | 1043 | | 87.93 ± 0.03 | 2024 | 2019 | 2010 | Direct imaging | |
| Ross 458 | Ross 458(AB) c† | | 27 ± 4 | 1.45 ± 0.06 | 33081 | 1167.7 | 0.17 | 37.53 ± 0.05 | 2010 | 2010 | ≥2005/ 2009 | Direct imaging | |
| BD+60 1417 | BD+60 1417b† | | 13.47±5.67 | 1.31±0.06 | | 1662 | | 144±13 | 2021 | | | Direct imaging | |
| SE 70 | S Ori 68† | | 5 | | | 1700 ± 300 | | 1290 | | 2006 | 2001 | Direct imaging | |
| UPM J1040-3551 Aa/Ab | CWISE J104053.42–355029.7 Ba/Bb† | | 11.5-34.6 & 9.4-28.3 | | | 1700 | | 82.5 | 2024 | 2024 | | Direct imaging | |
| 2MASS J0249-0557AB | 2MASS J0249-0557c† | | 11.6+1.3 −1.0 | | | 1950 | | 159 | 2018 | | | Direct imaging | |
| GU Piscium | GU Piscium b† | | 11±2 | | 163000 | 2000 | | 155 | 2014 | | | Direct imaging | |
| LOri 167 | LOri 167B† | | 8+5 −1 | | | 2000 | | 1300 | | 2007 | 1999 | Direct imaging | |
| GSC 00568-01752 | SDSS J2249+0044AB† | | 12.5±0.2 (for single object) | | | 2264 & 17 ± 5 | | 146.7 | 2010 (motion)/ 2024 (mass) | 2010 | 2006 | Direct imaging | |
| WD 0806-661 | WD 0806-661 B† | | 7–9 | 1.17 ± 0.07 | | 2500 | | 62.73 ± 0.02 | 2011 | 2011 | 2004 | Direct imaging | |
| USco1621 A | USco1621 b† | | 16±2 | | | 2880 ±20 | | 452 | 2019 | | | Direct imaging | |
| USco1556 A | USco1556 b† | | 15±2 | | | 3500 ±40 | | 461 | 2019 | | | Direct imaging | |
| L 34-26 | COCONUTS-2b† | | 6.3+1.5 −1.9 | 1.1±0.03 | ~1100000 | 6471 | | 35.51±0.01 | 2021 | 2011 | | Direct imaging | |
| TYC 9486-927-1 | 2MASS J2126–8140† | | 13.3±1.7 | | ~900000 | 6684 | ? | 80.72±13.86 | 2016 | | | Direct imaging | |
| GJ 900 | CW2335+0142 | | 10.5 | | | 12000 | | 68.00 ± 0.03 | 2024 | 2024 | | Direct imaging | |
| BD+29 5007 | 2MASS J2351+3010† | | 11.9+0.40 −0.20 | | | 22106 | | 77.12 ± 0.03 | 2024 | 2016 | 2005 | Direct imaging | |

== See also ==
- Lists of exoplanets
- List of largest exoplanets
- List of nearest exoplanets
- List of nearest terrestrial exoplanet candidates
- List of potentially habitable exoplanets
- List of stars with resolved images
