= HR 8799 c =

Jovian exoplanet orbiting HR 8799

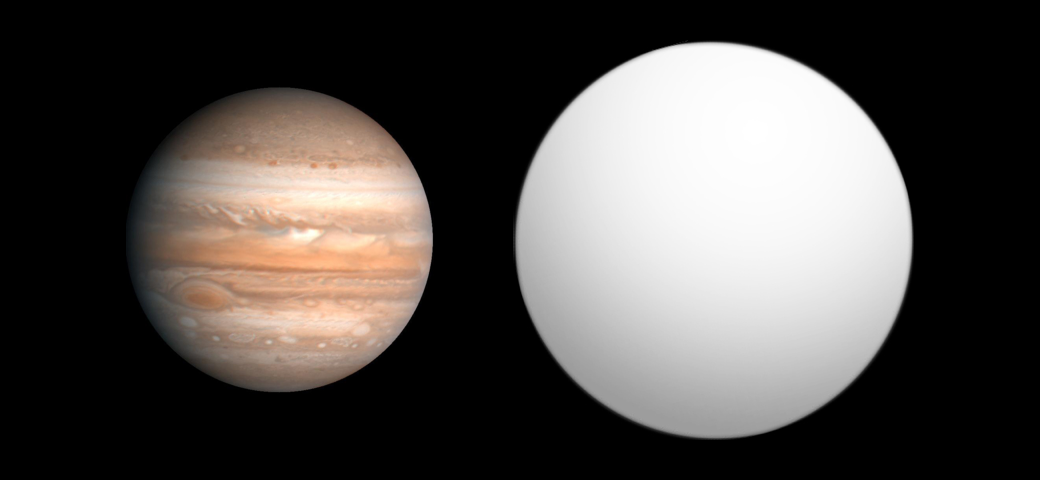
- Size comparison of HR 8799 c (gray) with Jupiter.

Discovery
- Discovered by: Marois et al.
- Discovery site: Keck and Gemini observatories in Hawaii
- Discovery date: November 13, 2008
- Detection method: Direct imaging

Orbital characteristics
- Semi-major axis: 43.44+1.40 −1.31 AU
- Eccentricity: 0.02+0.02 −0.01 °
- Orbital period (sidereal): 209.5 years
- Inclination: 28.00+2.68 −3.17 °
- Longitude of ascending node: 63.43+4.30 −5.83 °
- Argument of periastron: 68.82+63.88 −53.95 °
- Star: HR 8799

Physical characteristics
- Mean radius: 1.10±0.01 R_{J}
- Mass: 9.02+2.91 −2.94 M_{J}
- Mean density: 4.702 g/cm^{3}
- Surface gravity: 10^{4.26+0.02 −0.03} cgs
- Temperature: 1159+11 −12 K

HR 8799 c is an extrasolar planet located approximately 129 light-years away in the constellation of Pegasus, orbiting the 6th magnitude Lambda Boötis star HR 8799. This planet has 7.8 times the mass of Jupiter and 1.10 times the radius. It orbits at 41.0 AU from HR 8799 with an low eccentricity and a period of 210 years; it is the 2nd planet discovered in the HR 8799 system.

Along with two other planets orbiting HR 8799, this planet was discovered on November 13, 2008, by Marois et al., using the Keck and the Gemini observatories in Hawaii. These planets were discovered using the direct imaging technique. In January 2010, HR 8799 c became the 9th exoplanet candidate to have a portion of its spectrum directly observed (following 2M1207b, DH Tau b, GQ Lup b, AB Pic b, CHXR 73 b, HD 203030 b, CT Cha b and 1RXS J1609b), confirming the feasibility of direct spectrographic studies of exoplanets.

== Spectra ==
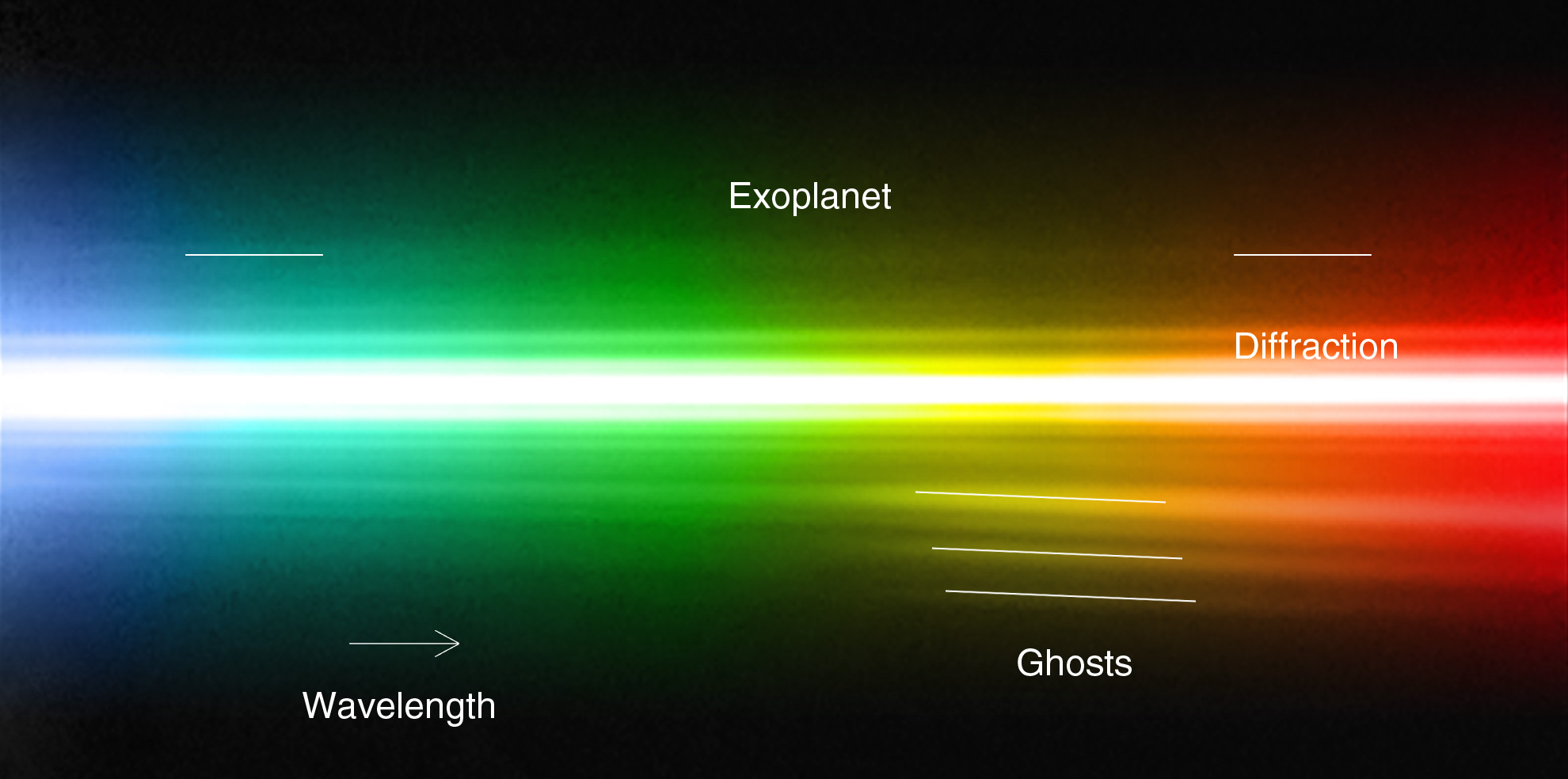
The spectrum of the planet HR 8799 c. The spectrum of the star and the planet was obtained with the NACO adaptive optics instrument on ESO’s Very Large Telescope.

Near infrared spectroscopy from 995 to 1769 nanometers made with the Palomar Observatory show evidence of ammonia, perhaps some acetylene but neither carbon dioxide nor substantial methane. High resolution spectroscopy with the OSIRIS instrument on the Keck Observatory show numerous well resolved lines of molecular absorption in the planet's atmosphere in the K band. Although methane is absent, the planet's atmosphere contains both water and carbon monoxide; the carbon-to-oxygen ratio of HR 8799 c is higher than that of its star, suggesting that the planet formed through the core accretion process.

Later, in November 2018, researchers confirmed the existence of water and the absence of methane in the atmosphere of HR 8799c, using high-resolution spectroscopy and near-infrared adaptive optics (NIRSPAO) at the Keck Observatory.

The detection of water and carbon monoxide in the planetary atmosphere was announced in 2021.
