= 14 Herculis c =

Extrasolar planet in the constellation Hercules

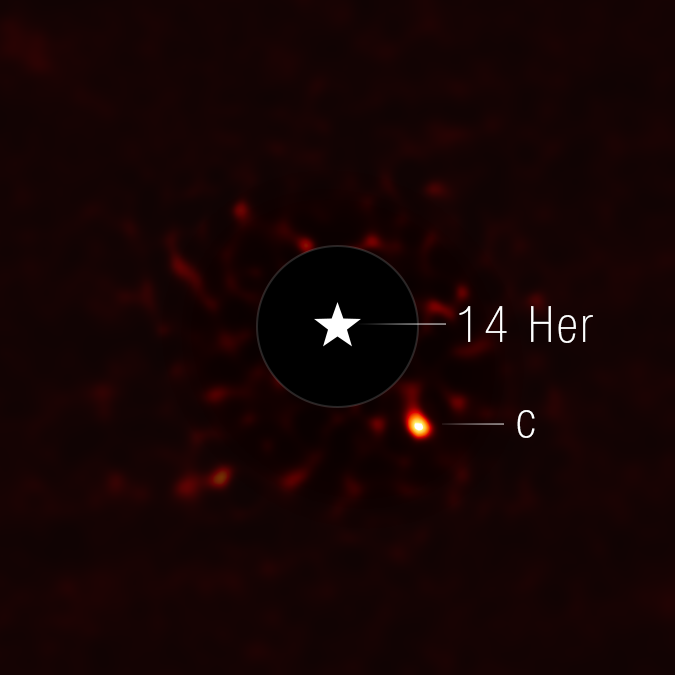
- Direct image of 14 Herculis c taken with the James Webb Space Telescope. Its host star is blocked by a coronagraph.

Discovery
- Discovered by: Goździewski et al.; Rosenthal et al.
- Discovery site: Observatoire de Haute-Provence, Keck & AFP
- Discovery date: 17 November 2005 (candidate); 2 July 2021 (confirmed)
- Detection method: Doppler spectroscopy

Designations
- Alternative names: HD 145675 c

Orbital characteristics
- Semi-major axis: 28.1+6.4 −6.8 AU
- Eccentricity: 0.64+0.06 −0.10
- Orbital period (sidereal): 52,160±1,030 days (142.8±2.8 years)
- Inclination: 111.9°+5.4° −5.5°
- Longitude of ascending node: 205.1°+7.448° −10.31°
- Time of periastron: 2,451,779±33 JD
- Argument of periastron: 172.5°+4.011° −4.584°
- Semi-amplitude: 50.8±0.4 m/s
- Star: 14 Herculis

Physical characteristics
- Mean radius: 1.03±0.01 R_{J}
- Mass: 7.9+1.6 −1.2 M_{J}
- Surface gravity: 4.25±0.15 cgs
- Temperature: 275 K (2 °C; 35 °F)

14 Herculis c or 14 Her c is the outermost of two known exoplanets orbiting the star 14 Herculis, approximately 58.4 light-years away in the constellation of Hercules. The planet has a mass that would make it a gas giant roughly the same size as Jupiter but much more massive.

== Discovery ==
14 Herculis c was discovered by the radial velocity method. Its discovery was first reported in 2005 (published in 2006), using data from the ELODIE Planet Search survey. It remained a planet candidate until its existence was securely confirmed in 2021.

According to a 2007 analysis, the existence of a second planet in the 14 Herculis system was "clearly" supported by the evidence, but the planet's parameters were not precisely known. It may be in a 4:1 resonance with the inner planet 14 Herculis b.

The inclination and true mass of 14 Herculis c were measured in 2021, using data from Gaia, and refined by further astrometric studies in 2022 and 2023, as well by a 2025 study using James Webb Space Telescope astrometry. The inclination is 116°, corresponding to a true mass of 7.1 M_{J}.

== Direct imaging ==
The planet was directly imaged with the James Webb Space Telescope's NIRCam instrument in 2025. The observations determined a temperature of 275 K (2 °C), making it one of the coldest exoplanets directly imaged. They also re-measured its orbital elements, finding it to be closer to the star, at around 15 AU, on a highly eccentric orbit, as well as measuring its orbital inclination, finding it to be misaligned with 14 Herculis b by 40°. At wavelengths of 4.4 μm, its apparent magnitude is fainter than expected, hinting at disequilibrium chemistry and/or water ice clouds.

== See also ==
- Epsilon Eridani b
- Epsilon Indi Ab
- HD 222237
