= 1RXS J160929.1−210524 =

Star in the constellation of Scorpius

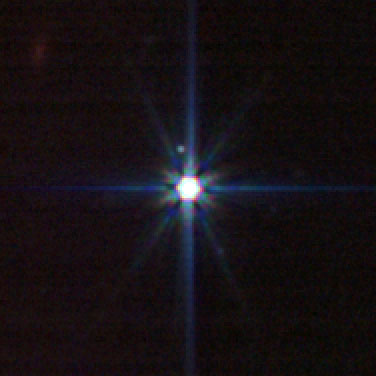
- 1RXS J160929.1−210524 image taken with MIRI. The companion is the faint object above the star. Credit: NASA/ESA/CSA JWST; Ya-Lin Wu et al.; Processing: Meli_thev

Observation data Epoch J2000 Equinox J2000
- Constellation: Scorpius
- Right ascension: 16^{h} 09^{m} 30.3075^{s}
- Declination: −21° 04′ 58.944″
- Apparent magnitude (V): 12.77

Characteristics
- Evolutionary stage: pre-main sequence
- Spectral type: K7V
- Variable type: T Tauri star

Astrometry
Proper motion (μ)	RA: −10.195(22) mas/yr Dec.: −23.307(15) mas/yr
Parallax (π)	7.2444±0.0176 mas
Distance	450 ± 1 ly (138.0 ± 0.3 pc)

Details
Mass	0.85^{+0.20}_{−0.10} M_{☉}
Radius	1.35 R_{☉}
Temperature	4060^{+300}_{−200} K
Age	5 million years

Other designations
- 2MASS J16093030-2104589, GSC 06213-01358, 1RXS J160929.1−210524

Database references
SIMBAD	data

1RXS J160929.1−210524 (also known as GSC 6213-1358 or PZ99 J160930.3−210459) is a pre-main-sequence star approximately 450 light-years away in the constellation of Scorpius.

The star was identified as a member of the Upper Scorpius subgroup of the Scorpius–Centaurus association by Thomas Preibisch and coauthors in 1998, and was originally assigned an age of 5 million years old based on its group membership. A more recent analysis of the ages of the stars in the Upper Scorpius group estimates the average age of the stars at 11 million years.

== Stellar characteristics ==
This star was identified as a young object belonging to the Upper Scorpius subgroup of the Scorpius–Centaurus association in two papers published in 1998 and 1999, based on its lithium abundance, X-ray emission, and position in the H–R diagram. The spectrum of 1RXS J160929.1-210524 reveals it to be cooler than the Sun with a spectral type that has been estimated at K7 or M0, so the star can be considered an orange dwarf or a red dwarf. The star is estimated to be around 0.85 times as massive as the Sun and to have an effective temperature of 4,060 K. The Upper Scorpius association is quite young and only stars earlier (hotter) than type A3 have reached the main sequence; less massive stars, such as 1RXS J160929.1−210524, are still in the process of contraction during the pre-main sequence phase. Originally, the association was estimated to be around 5 million years old, but a recent 2012 paper made a significant revision of this value to 11 million years, which is therefore considered to be the age of 1RXS J160929.1-210524.

== Substellar companion ==
On 8 September 2008, it was announced that astronomer David Lafrenière and collaborators used the Gemini Observatory to take pictures of the star which appeared to show a planet (designated 1RXS J160929.1-210524 b). The apparent planet is very large—about eight times the mass of Jupiter, orbiting the star at a distance of 330 AU (roughly 50 billion kilometres or 31 billion miles). The orbital status of the companion planet was confirmed in a paper submitted on 15 June 2010 to The Astrophysical Journal. This made it the smallest known exoplanet orbiting its host at such a distance. It is also the third announced directly imaged exoplanet orbiting a sun-like star (after GQ Lup b and AB Pic b), and the 8th directly imaged exoplanet candidate to have spectrum taken (after 2M1207b, DH Tau b, GQ Lup b, AB Pic b, CHXR 73 b, HD 203030 b and CT Cha b).

The discoverers note that the object's location far from its star presents serious challenges to current models of planetary formation: the timescale to form a planet by core accretion at this distance from the star would be longer than the age of the system itself. One possibility is that the planet may have formed closer to the star and migrated outwards as a result of interactions with the disk or with other planets in the system. An alternative is that the planet formed in situ via the disk instability mechanism, where the disk fragments because of gravitational instability, though this would require an unusually massive protoplanetary disk.

With the upward revision in the age of the Upper Scorpius group from 5 million to 11 million years, the estimated mass of 1RXS J1609b is approximately 14 Jupiter masses, i.e. above the deuterium-burning limit. An older age for the J1609 system implies that the luminosity of J1609b is consistent with a much more massive object, making more likely that J1609b may instead be a brown dwarf which formed in a manner similar to that of other low-mass and substellar companions. On the other hand, a 2026 study employing the same age estimate obtained a mass of 9.5+1.5
−1.7 Jupiter masses, which is well within the planetary-mass regime.

A 2013 study, using data from the Spitzer Space Telescope, detected a moderate excess of infrared radiation at 24 μm coming from this system, indicating the presence of a dusty debris disk, but could not determine whether the excess was coming from the star or the substellar companion (or both). In 2015, observations with the Magellan Clay Telescope found evidence that the light from the substellar object is obscured and reddened by 4.5 visual magnitudes of circumstellar extinction, which indicated that the object is surrounded by a dusty disk responsible for the infrared excess. When considering the extinction in modeling the object's spectrum, its effective temperature was increased to 2,000 K and the spectral type to L2.

The 1RXS J160929.1−210524 planetary system
Companion (in order from star)	Mass	Semimajor axis (AU)	Orbital period (days)	Eccentricity	Inclination (°)	Radius
b	9.5+1.5 −1.7 M_{J}	385+110 −78	8600+4800 −2900	0.21+0.14 −0.12	150+13 −12	~1.7 R_{J}

== See also ==
- Lists of exoplanets
