= HD 222237 =

K-type main-sequence star

Observation data Epoch J2000 Equinox ICRS
- Constellation: Tucana
- Right ascension: 23^{h} 39^{m} 37.38737^{s}
- Declination: −72° 43′ 19.7554″
- Apparent magnitude (V): 7.09

Characteristics
- Evolutionary stage: main sequence
- Spectral type: K3+V
- U−B color index: 0.824
- B−V color index: 1.001
- V−R color index: 0.585

Astrometry
Radial velocity (R_{v})	69.62±0.13 km/s
Proper motion (μ)	RA: 143.736 mas/yr Dec.: −736.907 mas/yr
Parallax (π)	87.3724±0.0187 mas
Distance	37.329 ± 0.008 ly (11.445 ± 0.002 pc)
Absolute magnitude (M_{V})	6.80

Details
Mass	0.76±0.09 M_{☉}
Radius	0.71±0.06 R_{☉}
Luminosity	0.22 L_{☉}
Surface gravity (log g)	4.61±0.10 cgs
Temperature	4751±139 K
Metallicity [Fe/H]	−0.32±0.02 dex
Rotational velocity (v sin i)	2.4 km/s
Age	8.8+5.3 −8.1 Gyr

Other designations
- CD−73 1672, GJ 902, HD 222237, HIP 116745, SAO 258167, LHS 3994, PLX 5721

Database references
SIMBAD	data
Exoplanet Archive	data
ARICNS	data

HD 222237 is a K-type main-sequence star located 37.3 light-years (11.4 parsecs) away in the constellation Tucana. With an apparent magnitude of 7.1, it is too faint to be visible to the naked eye. It is somewhat smaller, fainter, and cooler than the Sun, with about 76% of the Sun's mass, 71% of its radius, and just 22% of its luminosity, with an effective temperature of 4,750 Kelvin. It is a low metallicity star, meaning the abundance of elements heavier than helium is lower than in the Sun. No infrared excess has been detected that would otherwise indicate the presence of a circumstellar disk around this star.

The star hosts one known exoplanet, the super-Jupiter HD 222237 b. This planet was discovered in 2024 using radial velocity as well as astrometry from the Hipparcos and Gaia space telescopes. It has about 5 times the mass of Jupiter, and has an eccentric orbit around its star with a period of about 40 years at a distance of about 11 AU, around the distance of Saturn from the Sun. Direct imaging of the planet with the James Webb Space Telescope is planned.

The HD 222237 planetary system
Companion (in order from star)	Mass	Semimajor axis (AU)	Orbital period (years)	Eccentricity	Inclination (°)	Radius
b	5.19±0.58 M_{J}	10.8+1.1 −1.0	40.8+5.8 −4.5	0.56±0.03	49.9+3.4 −2.8	—

== See also ==
- 14 Herculis
- Epsilon Eridani b
- Epsilon Indi Ab
