= 1RXS =

Astronomical catalog

1RXS, acronym for the First ROSAT X-ray Survey, is a catalogue of astronomical objects that were visible in the X-ray spectrum from the ROSAT satellite.

Examinations of 1RXS has shown that many sources can be identified, such as old neutron stars, while other entries are "intriguing", according to one researcher.

== Notable 1RXS objects ==
The following is a list of some notable objects in the 1RXS catalogue.

- 1RXS J185635.1-375433 (RX J1856.5-3754)
- 1RXS J072040.4-312522 (RX J0720.4-3125)
- 1RXS J160531.9+324915 (RX J1605.3+3249 or RBS 1556)
- 1RXS J130848.1+212708 (RX J1308.6+2127 or RBS 1223)
- 1RXS J214303.7+065419 (RX J2143.0+0654 or RBS 1774)
- 1RXS J080623.0-412233 (RX J0806.4-4123)
- 1RXS J042004.2-502209 (RX J0420.0-5022)
- 1RXS J141256.0+792204 (Calvera)
- 1RXS J160929.1-210524
- 1RXS J101015.9-311909

== See also ==
- 1RXS J160929.1−210524, example
