= Alpha Centauri Ab =

Candidate exoplanet orbiting Alpha Centauri A

Alpha Centauri Ab Rigil Kentaurus b
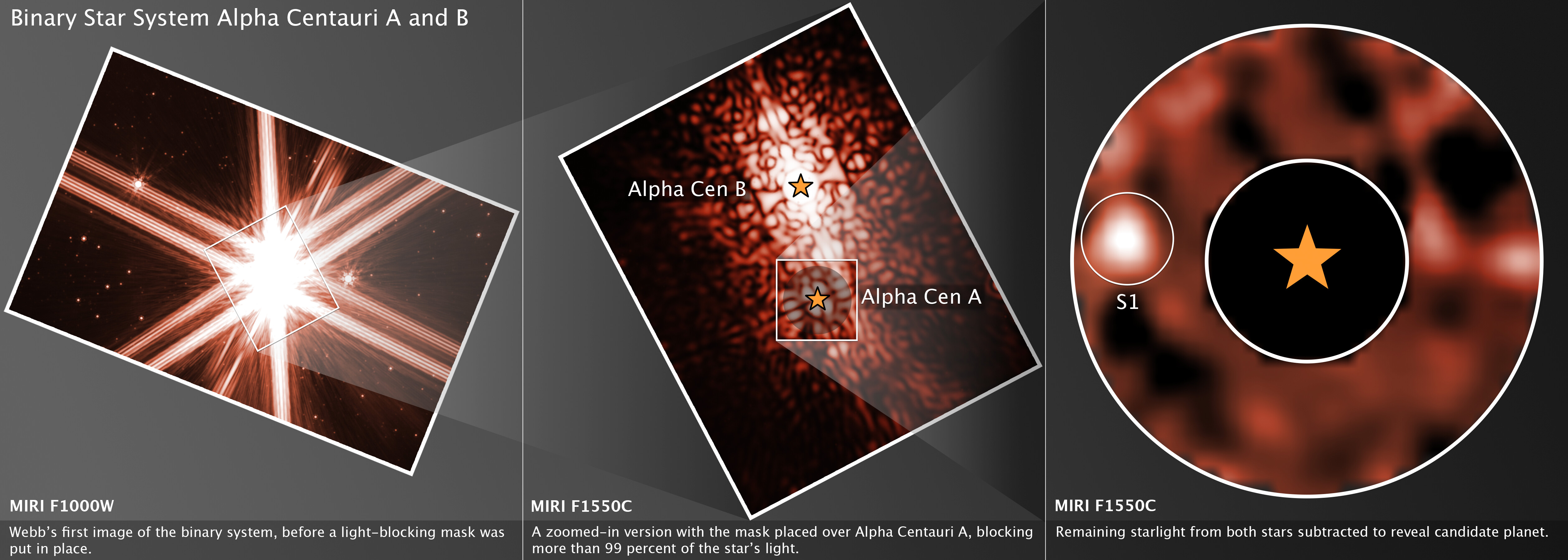
- The candidate planet imaged by JWST (third picture, circled with the label "S1")

Discovery
- Discovered by: K. Wagner, et al.
- Discovery date: May–June 2019 (first imaging); February 2021 (reported)
- Detection method: Direct imaging

Designations
- Alternative names: Alpha Centauri Ab, Rigil Kentaurus b, S1+C1

Orbital characteristics
- Semi-major axis: 1.64–2.23 AU
- Eccentricity: ~0.4
- Orbital period (sidereal): 2 to 3 years
- Inclination: ~15 – 165°
- Star: Alpha Centauri A (Rigil Kentaurus)

Physical characteristics
- Mean radius: 1.0–1.1 R_{J}
- Mass: 90–150 M_{🜨}
- Temperature: 225 K

Alpha Centauri Ab (also known as Rigil Kentaurus b, or originally as Candidate 1) is a candidate exoplanet that was first directly imaged around Alpha Centauri A in 2019 and reported in February 2021. If confirmed as an exoplanet, it would be the nearest, coldest, shortest-period and oldest directly imaged exoplanet around a solar-type star, and Alpha Centauri would be the brightest planet-hosting star (see list of brightest stars). The planet is expected to be a gas giant based on physical properties. Additional observations are needed to confirm its existence.

== Discovery ==
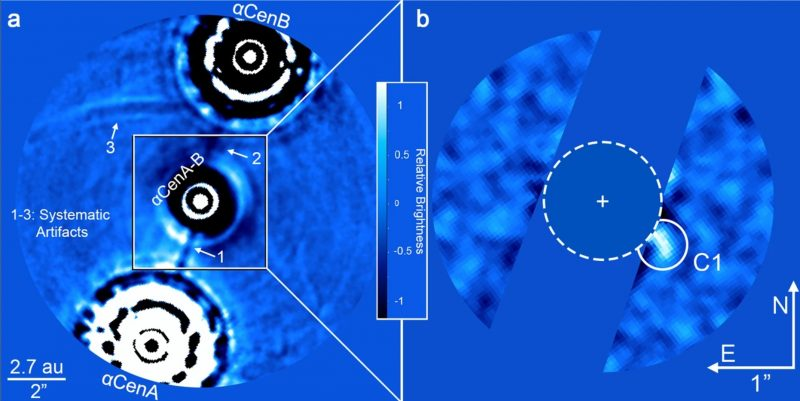
The discovery image of Candidate 1, obtained by combining numerous mid-infrared images taken by the European Southern Observatory's Very Large Telescope in May and June 2019

Astronomers from the Breakthrough Watch Initiative directly imaged the habitable zone candidate using the European Southern Observatory's Very Large Telescope in May and June 2019, using a newly developed system for mid-infrared exoplanet imaging. The image suggested an apparent separation distance of approximately 1.1 astronomical units (AU) from Alpha Centauri A, and previous observations from years before ruled out the possibility of it being a background star. The team presented the discovery of the exoplanet candidate in a publication in Nature Communications titled "Imaging low-mass planets within the habitable zone of Alpha Centauri." However, the observation arc, being only 100 hours long, was not enough to determine whether a signal was planetary in nature, and it was thought possible that it was zodiacal dust or an instrumental artifact.

== James Webb Space Telescope observations ==
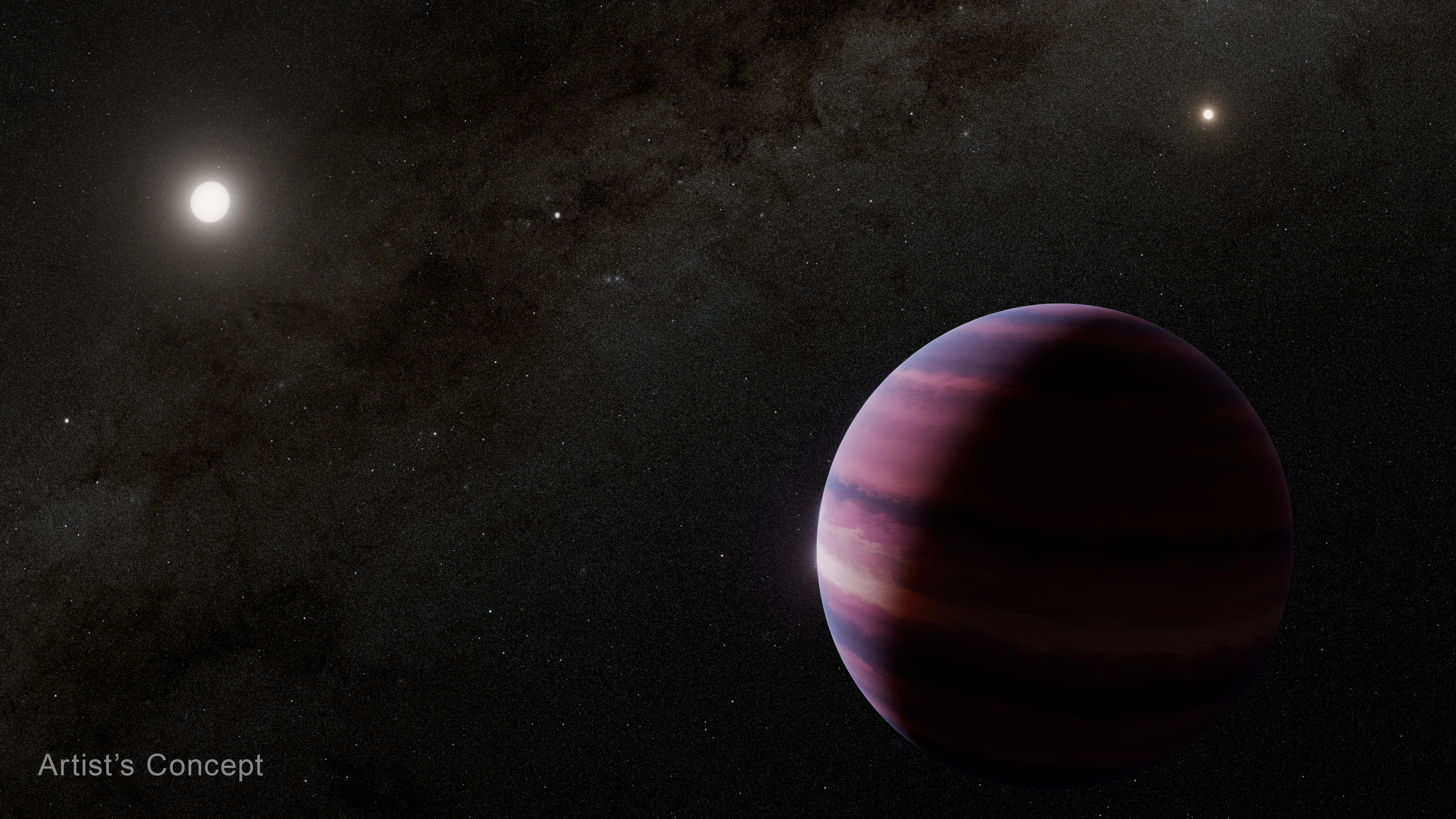
Artist's impression of Alpha Centauri A and its gas planet with Toliman (Alpha Centauri B) (right) on background

In August 2024, the James Webb Space Telescope's Mid-Infrared Instrument (MIRI) directly imaged a point-like source at a projected separation of 2 AU from Alpha Centauri A. It is confirmed to be not a background or foreground source or a cloud of dust, and is unlikely to be an instrumental artifact. If it is an exoplanet, it should be the same candidate observed in 2021. The object was not recovered and will need more observations to be confirmed.

== Physical characteristics ==
=== Candidate 1 ===
While little was known about the candidate planet, there were some characteristics that could be inferred based on its observations. It would have an orbital inclination of ~70° relative to Earth's point of view, consistent with the inclination of the Alpha Centauri system as a whole. Because of the detection algorithm, it would be somewhere around Neptune's mass, and would be no larger than 7 R_{🜨} as its mass would exceed the radial-velocity threshold of ~50 M_{🜨}, but no smaller than 3.3 R_{🜨} as that would not render the signature given in the paper. Due to this large size, it is highly unlikely to be rocky and is probably a Neptune-sized planet.

=== New finding ===
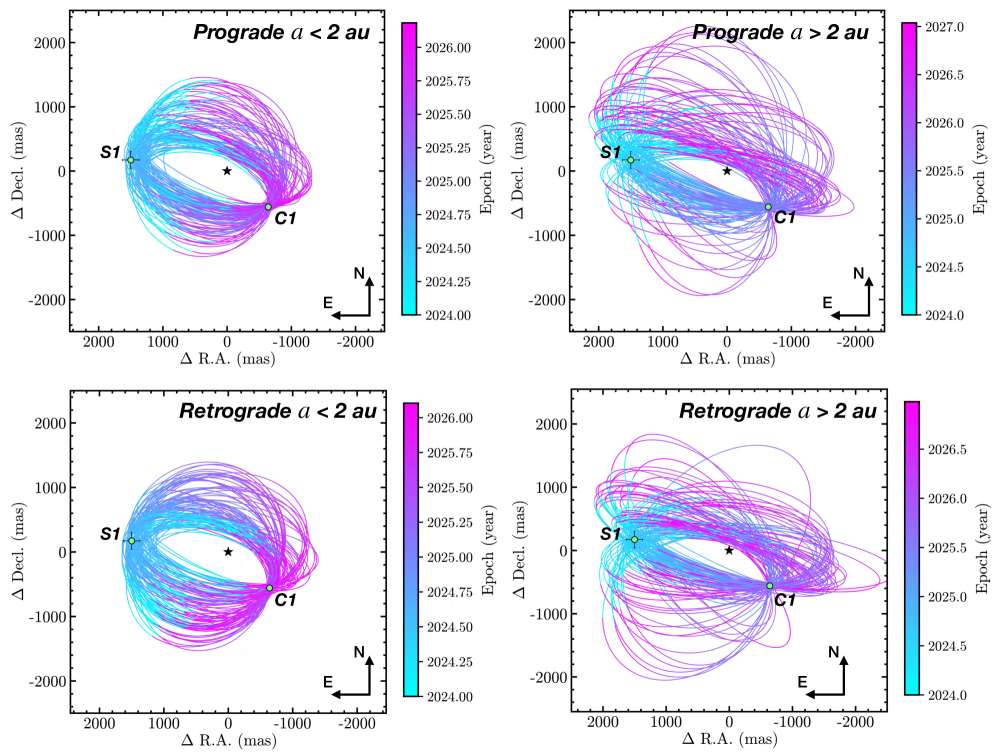
Possible orbits of Alpha Centauri Ab based on 2021 and 2025 observations

A 2025 study using observations from the James Webb Telescope derived a mass between 90 and 150 M_{🜨} and a radius of 1.0–1.1 R_{J}. Combining non-detections and observations of the candidate in 2019 by VLT and JWST in 2024, the team estimated an orbital period between 2 and 3 years, an orbital eccentricity of 0.4 and an inclination relative to the Alpha Centauri AB orbital plane of approximately 50 to 130°.

== See also ==
- Lists of exoplanets
- List of directly imaged exoplanets
- List of largest exoplanets
- List of nearest exoplanets
