= HIP 78530 b =

Extrasolar planet

Discovery
- Discovered by: David Lafrenière et al.
- Discovery site: Gemini Observatory North, USA
- Discovery date: Published January 24, 2011
- Detection method: Direct imaging

Orbital characteristics
- Semi-major axis: 550+360 −160 AU
- Eccentricity: 0.65+0.19 −0.26
- Orbital period (sidereal): 7800+9300 −3200 years
- Inclination: 122+19 −14°
- Longitude of ascending node: 82+54 −57 or 262+54 −57°
- Argument of periastron: 95+49 −28 or 275+49 −28°
- Star: HIP 78530

Physical characteristics
- Mean radius: 2.63±0.26 R_{J} 2.88±0.46 R_{J}
- Mass: 14+26 −11 M_{J}
- Surface gravity: 10^{3.97±0.03} cgs 10^{4.05±0.08} cgs
- Temperature: 2667±180 K

HIP 78530 b is an object that is either a planet or a brown dwarf in the orbit of the star HIP 78530. It was observed as early as 2000, but the object was not confirmed as one in orbit of the star HIP 78530 until a direct imaging project photographed the star in 2008. The image caught the attention of the project's science team, so the team followed up on its initial observations. HIP 78530 b orbits a young, hot, bright blue star in the Upper Scorpius association. The planet itself is over twenty-three times more massive than Jupiter, orbiting eighteen times further from its host star than Pluto does from the Sun by the estimates published in its discovery paper. In this predicted orbit, HIP 78530 b completes an orbit every twelve thousand years.

== Discovery ==
Between 2000 and 2001, the ADONIS system at the ESO 3.6 m Telescope in Chile detected a faint object in the vicinity of HIP 78530. This object was reported in 2005 and 2007, although the astronomers investigating the star were not able to tell, based on their observations, if the faint object was an orbiting companion or not. The team did not follow up on this.

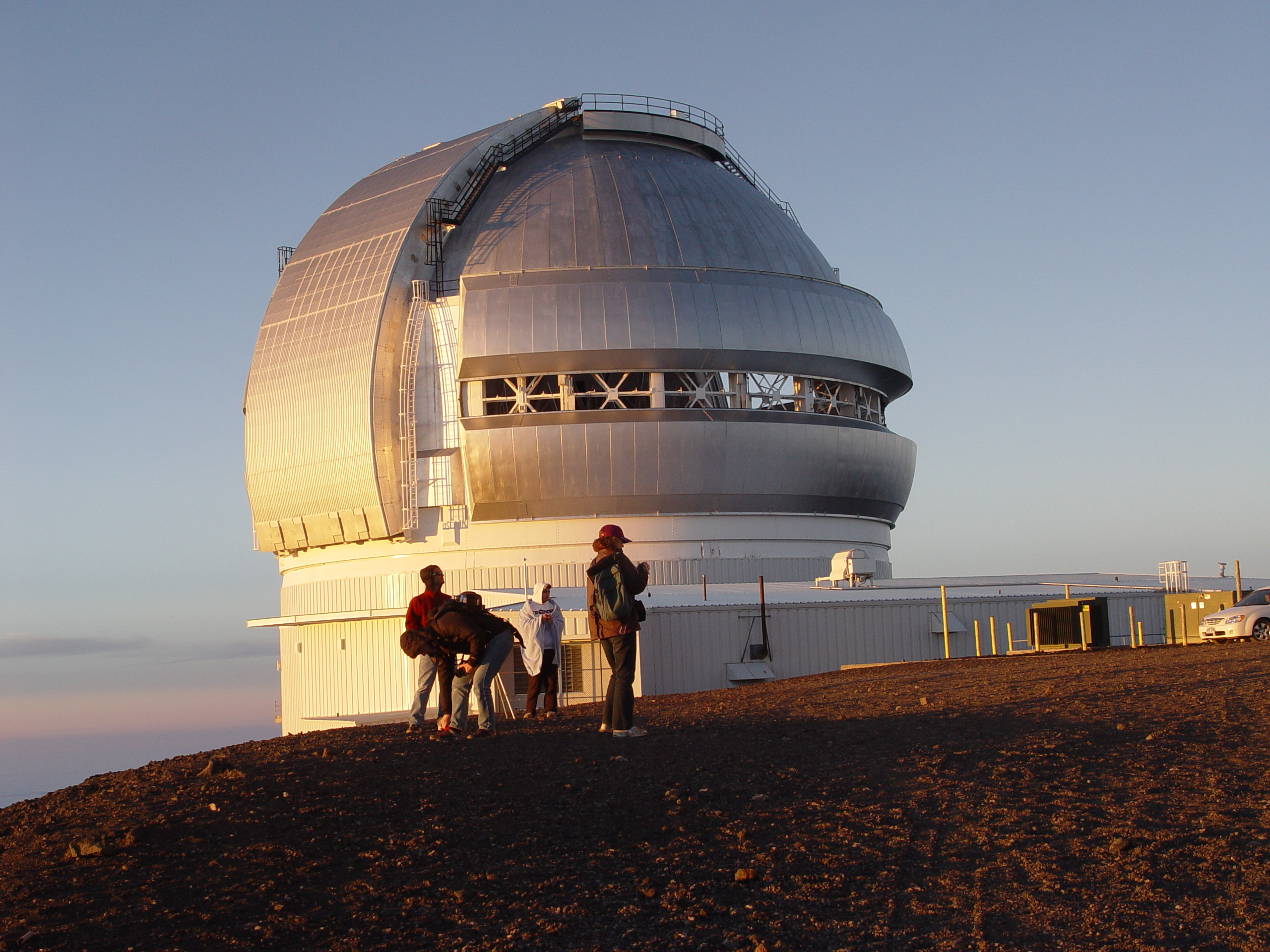
The North telescope of the Gemini Observatory, which directly imaged the HIP 78530 system.

The random selection of ninety-one stars in the Upper Scorpius association provided a sample of stars to be observed using the Near Infrared Imager and Spectrometer (NIRI) and Altitude conjugate Adaptive Optics for the Infrared (ALTAIR) adaptive optics system at the Gemini Observatory. Among the ninety stars selected for direct imaging was the star HIP 78530, which was first imaged by the camera on May 24, 2008. This initial image revealed the presence of the same faint object within the vicinity of HIP 78530.

Follow-up imaging took place on July 2, 2009, and August 30, 2010, using the same instruments, as astronomers hoped to reveal this companion object's proper motion, or the rate that it moves over time. Additional follow-up data was recovered in the spring and summer of 2010, but large errors in the data's astrometry led the investigating astronomers to disregard it. The observations over the three years was compiled, with the data used to filter out pixelated portions of the images and improve the images' quality. The result suggested not only that the faint object in the image was nearby the star HIP 78530, but that it was a brown dwarf or planet in size. Further study would be needed to prove its true nature.

On July 2, 2009, July 3, 2009, and August 8, 2009, use of the NIFS integral field spectrograph with ALTAIR allowed the astronomers to collect data on the spectrum of the faint object and its star. Analysis of the spectra and the objects' astrometry (how the star and the faint object change position in the sky) led to the confirmation of the companion HIP 78530 b.

The confirmation of HIP 78530 b was reported on January 24, 2011. In imaging the ninety-one stars, HIP 78530 b and 1RXSJ1609-2105b were discovered. The discoveries of these two orbiting bodies allowed astronomers to predict that bodies with such low planet/brown dwarf-to-star mass ratios (below 0.01) orbiting at a distance of hundreds of AU exists in the orbits of 2.2^{+5.5}_{−1.9}% of all stars. However, this number is a lower limit, as astronomers have been unable to detect smaller, low-mass planets that fit this scenario.

== Host star ==
HIP 78530
Observation data Epoch J2000 Equinox J2000
- Constellation: Scorpius
- Right ascension: 16^{h} 01^{m} 55.44^{s}
- Declination: −21° 58′ 49.77″
- Apparent magnitude (V): 7.1691±0.0459

Characteristics
- Spectral type: B9V

Astrometry
Proper motion (μ)	RA: −12.0126±0.123948 mas/yr Dec.: −24.1124±0.0703451 mas/yr
Parallax (π)	7.28477±0.078398 mas
Distance	445.8+4.87 −4.77 ly (136.759+1.493 −1.462 pc)

Details
Mass	2.69±0.24 M_{☉}
Radius	2.109+0.067 −0.059 R_{☉}
Luminosity	23.36 L_{☉}
Surface gravity (log g)	4.68+0.02 −0.01 cgs
Temperature	10690+24 −10 K
Metallicity [Fe/H]	−0.5+0.03 −0.01 dex
Age	5 Myr

Database references
SIMBAD	data

HIP 78530 is a luminous, blue B-type main sequence star in the Upper Scorpius association, a loose star cluster composed of stars with a common origin. The star is estimated to be approximately 2.2 times the mass of the Sun. Ages of the Upper Scorpius group have been quoted at 5 million years, however a more recent estimate suggests that the group is somewhat older (approximately 11 million years old). Its effective temperature is estimated at 10500 K, less than twice the effective temperature of the Sun.

HIP 78530 has an apparent magnitude of 7.18. It is incredibly faint, if visible at all, as seen from the unaided eye of an observer on Earth.

== Characteristics ==
HIP 78530 b is most likely a brown dwarf, a massive object that is large enough to fuse deuterium (something that planets are too small to do) but not large enough to ignite and become a star. Because HIP 78530 b's characteristics blend the line between whether or not it is a brown dwarf or a planet, astronomers have tried to determine what HIP 78530 b is by predicting whether it was created in a planet-like or star-like (how brown dwarfs are formed) manner.

Its estimated mass is 14+26
−11 times that of Jupiter. Additionally, HIP 78530 b orbits its host star at an semimajor axis of 550+360
−160 AU, which is 550+360
−160 times the average distance between the Earth and the Sun. The average distance between dwarf planet Pluto and the Sun, for reference, is 39.482 AU. HIP 78530 b completes an orbit approximately every 7800+9300
−3200 years, following a somewhat eccentric path. Only 0.2% of the orbit of this object has been tracked so far, with a baseline of 16 years, so the orbital parameters remain uncertain.
