= HIP 81208 =

Multiple star system in constellation Scorpius

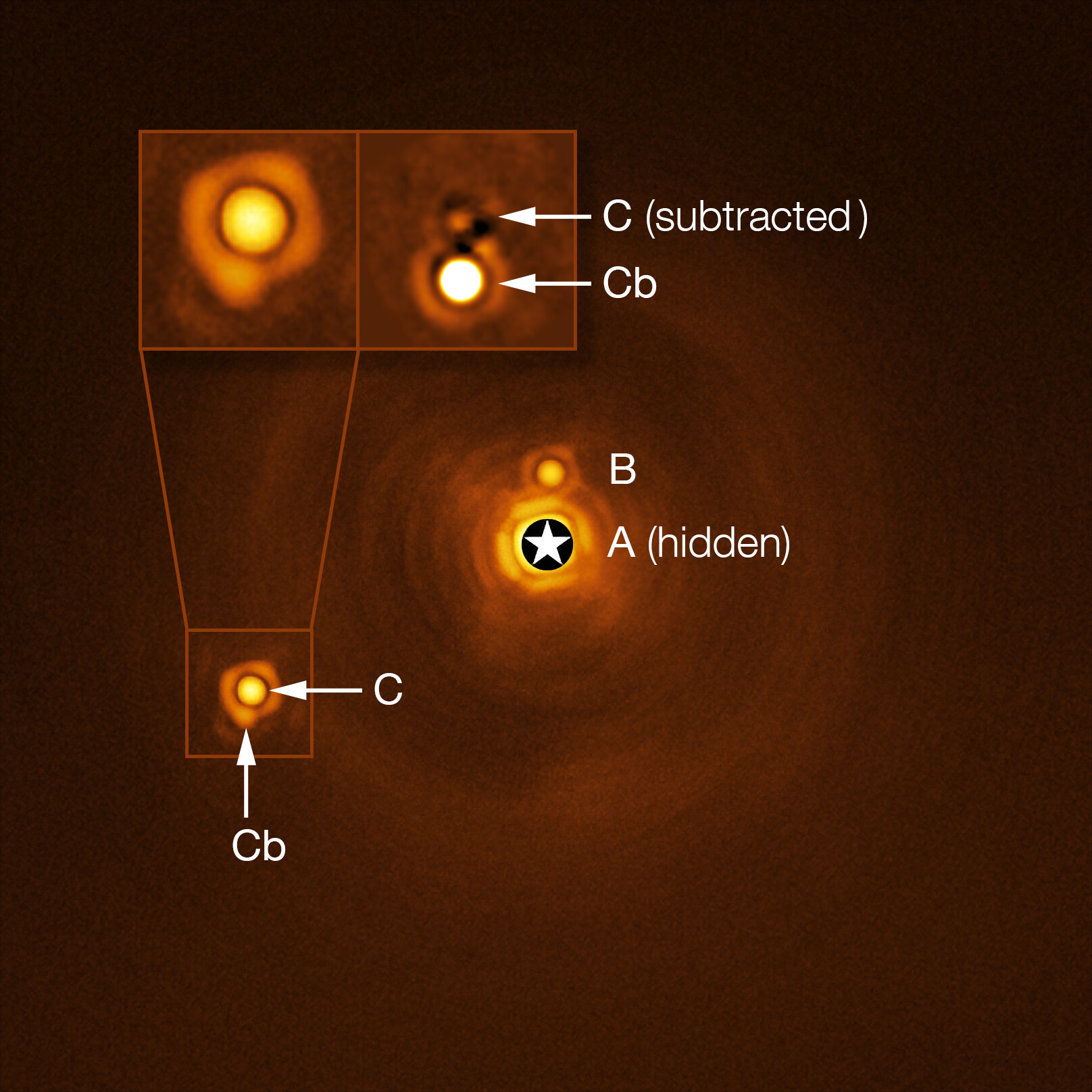
- The HIP 81208 system as captured by VLT, showing all four stellar and substellar components

Observation data Epoch J2000 Equinox ICRS
- Constellation: Scorpius
- Right ascension: 16^{h} 35^{m} 13.83929^{s}
- Declination: −35° 43′ 28.7256″
- Apparent magnitude (V): 6.64

Characteristics
- Spectral type: B9V + M5 + M4
- U−B color index: −0.208±0.009
- B−V color index: −0.049±0.007

Astrometry
Proper motion (μ)	RA: −9.701 mas/yr Dec.: −25.913 mas/yr
Parallax (π)	6.8424±0.0475 mas
Distance	477 ± 3 ly (146 ± 1 pc)
Absolute magnitude (M_{V})	0.292±0.080

Orbit
Primary	HIP 81208 A
Name	HIP 81208 B
Period (P)	246.9+251.3 −95.4 yr
Semi-major axis (a)	53.98+32.22 −15.00 AU
Eccentricity (e)	0.33+0.26 −0.22
Inclination (i)	46.61+15.71 −19.47°

Orbit
Primary	HIP 81208 A
Name	HIP 81208 C
Period (P)	2232.4+4429.4 −1213.6 yr
Semi-major axis (a)	234.27+168.65 −68.96 AU
Eccentricity (e)	0.38+0.29 −0.26
Inclination (i)	128.16+19.47 −15.36°

Details

HIP 81208 A
Mass	2.58±0.06 M_{☉}
Radius	2.213±0.121 R_{☉}
Luminosity	60.469±4.46 L_{☉}
Surface gravity (log g)	4.201±0.011 cgs
Temperature	10840±220 K
Age	17+3 −4 Myr

HIP 81208 B
Mass	67+6 −7 M_{Jup}
Temperature	2900 K

HIP 81208 C
Mass	0.135+0.010 −0.013 M_{☉}
Temperature	3165+40 −60 K

Other designations
- CD−35°11037, GC 22284, HD 149274, HIP 81208, SAO 207794, PPM 295214, TIC 280474618, TYC 7357-207-1, GSC 07357-00207, 2MASS J16351384-3543287, Gaia DR3 6020514769906985728

Database references
SIMBAD	HIP 81208

HIP 81208 (HD 149274) is a young triple or quadruple (Note: Depends on whether HIP 81208 Cb is counted as a planet or a brown dwarf.) hierarchical star system in the constellation of Scorpius. It consists of a B-type main sequence star (component A), a brown dwarf (B), and a red dwarf (C), the latter two distantly orbiting the primary star. The stars are part of the Scorpius–Centaurus association. In 2023, HIP 81208 C was found to be orbited by a substellar object, which is at the border between being a massive exoplanet and a low-mass brown dwarf. This made HIP 81208 the first stellar binary with substellar objects orbiting both stellar components ever discovered by direct imaging. With an apparent magnitude of 6.64, it is barely visible by the naked eye under dark skies.

== Stellar properties ==
The dominant component of the system, HIP 81208 A is a bright blue-white star with a spectral type of B9V, which is about 2.2 times larger, 2.6 times more massive, and 60 times more luminous than the Sun. It is very young at only 17 million years old, less than 0.4% the age of the Solar System (4.6 billion years).

In 2023, two smaller objects, respectively designated HIP 81208 B and C, were detected near the star using the SPHERE instrument at the Very Large Telescope in Antofagasta Region, Chile. They both have similar proper motions to HIP 81208 A, strongly supporting that the objects are physically bound to it.

HIP 81208 B is a high-mass (67 M_{J}) brown dwarf with an effective temperature of 2,900 K (2,630 °C; 4,760 °F), mostly due to residual heat from formation. It orbits the primary star at a distance of 54 AU (8.1 billion km) once every 247 years (albeit with a large margin of error), close to the orbital period of Pluto (247.94 years). HIP 81208 C orbits the star much farther at 234 AU (35.0 billion km) with a 2,242-year period, though its orbital parameters are also poorly constrained. It has a temperature of 3,165 K (2,892 °C; 5,237 °F), only slightly hotter than the brown dwarf. Curiously, the orbits of the two companions are almost orthogonal to one another, and are probably in a Kozai resonance with the host star.

=== Possible fourth star ===
The 15th-magnitude star Gaia DR3 6020420074469092608 (2MASS J16360769-3543514), located at a separation of 0.1823°, shares a similar parallax and proper motion with HIP 81208, and is potentially located within the Hill sphere of the system. This hints at the possibility of a fourth stellar component even farther from the primary star than the confirmed two.

== Planetary system ==
In 2023, a previously unresolved object was identified in orbit of HIP 81208 C. The object, with a mass of 14.8 M_{J}, is right at the boundary between exoplanets and brown dwarfs, as it is close to the threshold for deuterium fusion (~13 M_{J}). This made the HIP 81208 system the first binary between two stars (A, C) discovered by imaging where both stars are orbited by substellar companions (B, Cb). It orbits the red dwarf host somewhere around 23 AU (3.4 billion km) distant with a period of roughly 285 years.

HIP 81208 Cb is also unique in that it is unusually close to its host star for being a giant planet or brown dwarf companion to a late M-type star. Other objects of a similar nature, at least those that have been directly imaged, usually have a mass similar to that of the host star that a binary-like formation is likely, but HIP 81208 Cb is light enough that such a formation mode can be ruled out. The true formation of the object, however, remains inconclusive.

The HIP 81208 C planetary system
Companion (in order from star)	Mass	Semimajor axis (AU)	Orbital period (days)	Eccentricity	Inclination (°)	Radius
Cb	14.8±0.4 M_{J}	23.04^{+13.88}_{−6.55}	104100^{+107260}_{−40934}	—	—	—
