= 14 Herculis b =

Extrasolar planet in the constellation Hercules

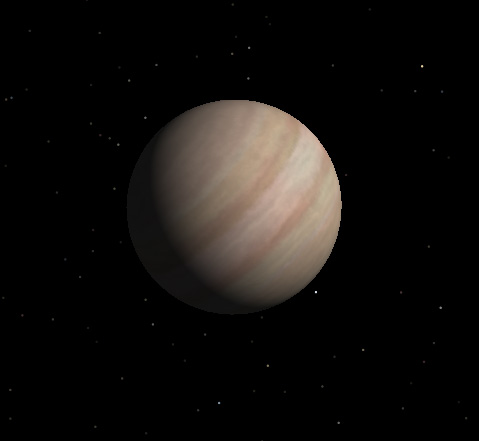
- The exoplanet 14 Herculis b as rendered by Celestia

Discovery
- Discovered by: Naef et al.; Butler et al.
- Discovery site: Switzerland
- Discovery date: 6 July 1998 (announced); January 2003 (published)
- Detection method: Doppler spectroscopy

Designations
- Alternative names: HD 145675 b

Orbital characteristics
- Semi-major axis: 2.843±0.040 AU
- Eccentricity: 0.371±0.003
- Orbital period (sidereal): 1763.57+0.80 −0.84 d 4.8285+0.0022 −0.0023 yr
- Inclination: 147.3°+2.2° −2.7°
- Longitude of ascending node: 276°±5°
- Time of periastron: 2,451,368.0±0.5 JD
- Argument of periastron: 22.28°±0.15°
- Semi-amplitude: 90.38±0.15 m/s
- Star: 14 Herculis

Physical characteristics
- Mass: 8.9+1.1 −1.5 M_{J}

14 Herculis b or 14 Her b is an exoplanet approximately 58.4 light-years away in the constellation of Hercules. The planet was found orbiting the star 14 Herculis, with a mass that would make the planet a Jovian planet roughly the same size as Jupiter but much more massive. It was discovered in July 1998 by the Geneva Extrasolar Planet Search team. The discovery was formally published in 2003. At the time of discovery it was the extrasolar planet with the longest orbital period, though longer-period planets have subsequently been discovered.

== Discovery ==
Radial velocity changes over time of 14 Herculis caused by the orbit of 14 Herculis b.

14 Herculis b was detected by measuring variations in its star's radial velocity as a result of the planet's gravity. This was done by making precise measurements of the Doppler shift of the spectrum of 14 Herculis. Prior to this analysis, another possible explanation of previous Doppler shift analysis included face-on spectroscopic binaries.

== Orbit and mass ==
Preliminary astrometric measurements made by the Hipparcos satellite suggested that this planet has an orbital inclination of 155.3° with respect to plane of the sky, which would imply a true mass of 11.1 times that of Jupiter, close to the deuterium burning threshold that some astronomers use to define the distinction between a planet and a brown dwarf. However subsequent analysis suggests that the Hipparcos measurements were not precise enough to accurately determine the orbits. According to a 2008 paper, its inclination was being calculated via astrometry with Hubble, with publication expected by mid-2009.

The inclination and true mass of 14 Herculis b were finally measured in 2021, using data from Gaia, and refined by further astrometric studies in 2022, 2023, and 2024. The inclination is 147.3°, and the true mass is 8.9 M_{J}.

== Direct imaging ==
Because of the wide separation between this planet and its host star, and the proximity of the 14 Herculis system to the Sun, it is a promising candidate for direct imaging of the planet, as the angular separation of the planet and host star will be large enough that the light from the planet and star might be spatially resolved. However, a search made using the adaptive optics CFHT 3.60m telescope on Mauna Kea did not make such a detection, confirming the object is not a star.
