= HD 36112 =

Star in the constellation Taurus

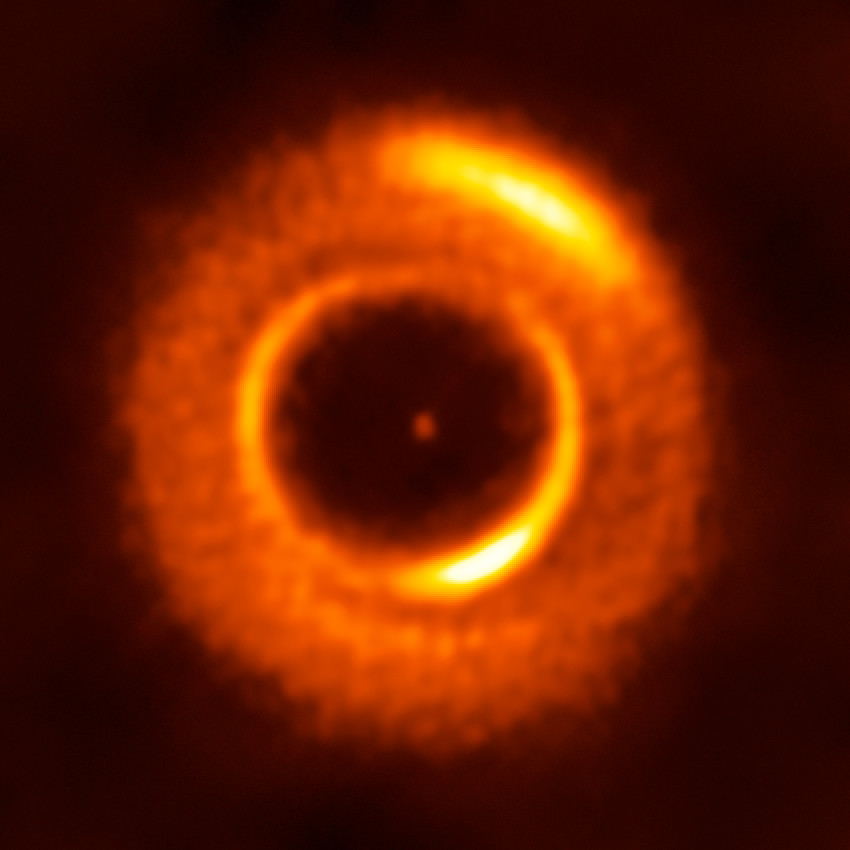
- HD 36112 and the surrounding dusty disk. The rings in the disk were measured as being elliptical in shape rather than being perfectly circular. Credit: ESO/R. Dong et al.; ALMA (ESO/NAOJ/NRAO)

Observation data Epoch J2000 Equinox ICRS
- Constellation: Taurus
- Right ascension: 05^{h} 30^{m} 27.52856^{s}
- Declination: +25° 19′ 57.0763″
- Apparent magnitude (V): 8.27

Characteristics
- Evolutionary stage: pre main sequence
- Spectral type: A8Ve

Astrometry
Proper motion (μ)	RA: 3.685(33) mas/yr Dec.: −26.373(22) mas/yr
Parallax (π)	6.4157±0.0314 mas
Distance	508 ± 2 ly (155.9 ± 0.8 pc)

Details
Mass	1.6 M_{☉}
Radius	2.0 R_{☉}
Luminosity	10 L_{☉}
Surface gravity (log g)	4.05 cgs
Temperature	7,600 K
Metallicity [Fe/H]	0.10 dex
Age	8.0 Myr

Other designations
- MWC 758, BD+25 843, HIP 25793, 2MASS J05302753+2519571, IRAS 05273+2517

Database references
SIMBAD	data

HD 36112, also known as MWC 758, is a young Herbig Ae star located in the constellation Taurus, surrounded by irregular rings of cosmic dust. The system is about 3.5 million years old. The disk has a cavity at 50 astronomical units and two spiral arms at 30–75 au that are seen in near-infrared scattered light, but only one spiral arm is seen in ALMA images.

The inner cavity was shown to be elliptical and not perfectly circular. This is not a projection effect but represents the shape of the cavity, with an eccentricity e ≈ 0.1 after the deprojection of the disk.

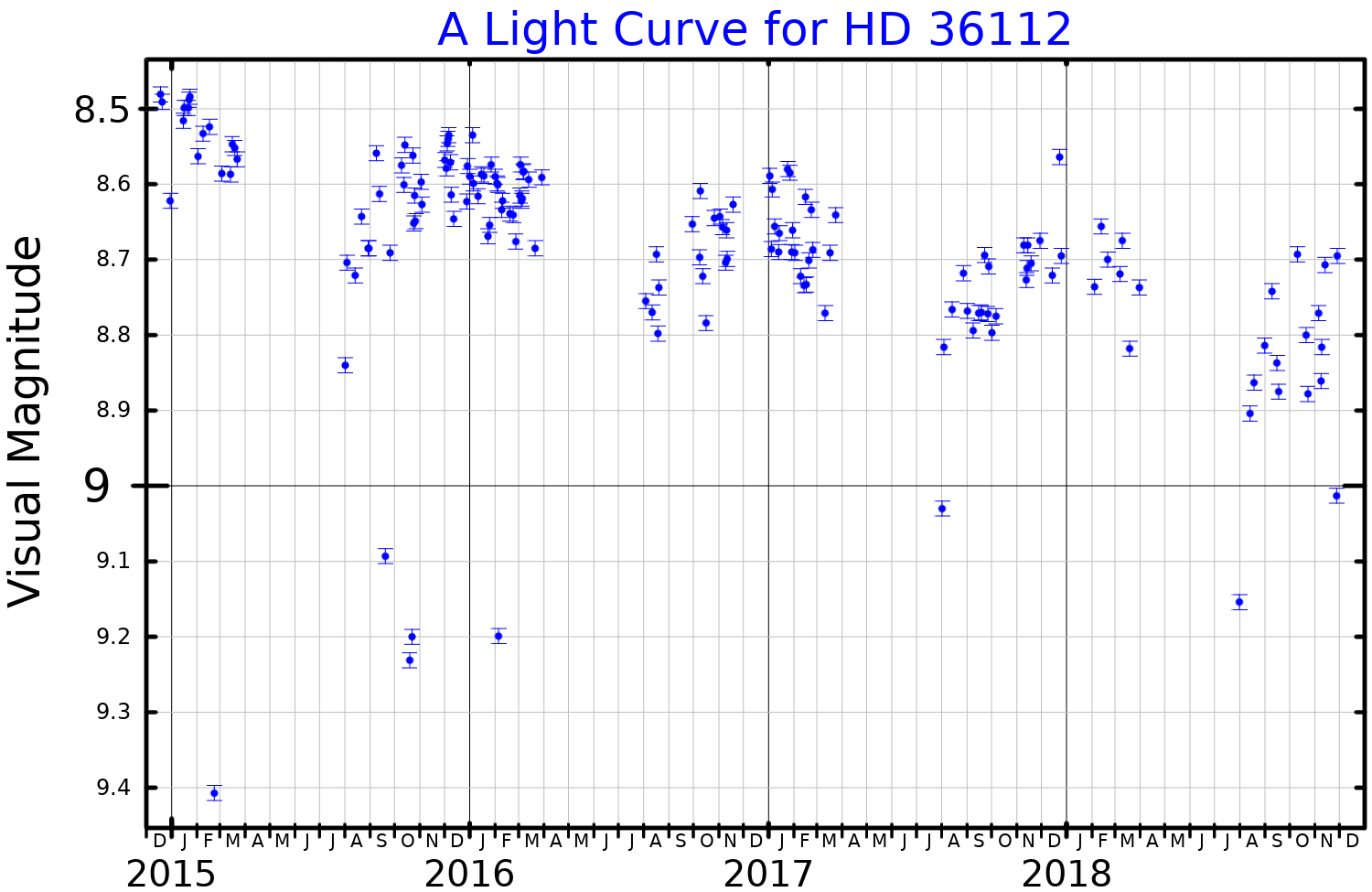
A light curve for HD 36112, plotted from ASAS-SN data

A 2018 study detected a possible exoplanet at a distance of about 20 au, designated MWC 758 b, and the observations with ALMA have also shown evidence of an unseen planet at 100 au. A study in 2019 came to the conclusion that a 1.5 M_{J} planet at 35 au and a 5 M_{J} planet at 140 au could explain the features seen with ALMA and the VLA.

In another 2019 study, a possible exoplanet or disk feature was detected with the Large Binocular Telescope, referred to as MWC 758 CC1 (Companion Candidate 1), with a non-detection of MWC 758 b. However, another study in 2021 failed to detect either of the point sources found in earlier studies. A 2023 study found further evidence for MWC 758 CC1, now designated MWC 758 c, orbiting at a distance of approximately 100 au.
