= CVSO 30 =

Star in the constellation Orion

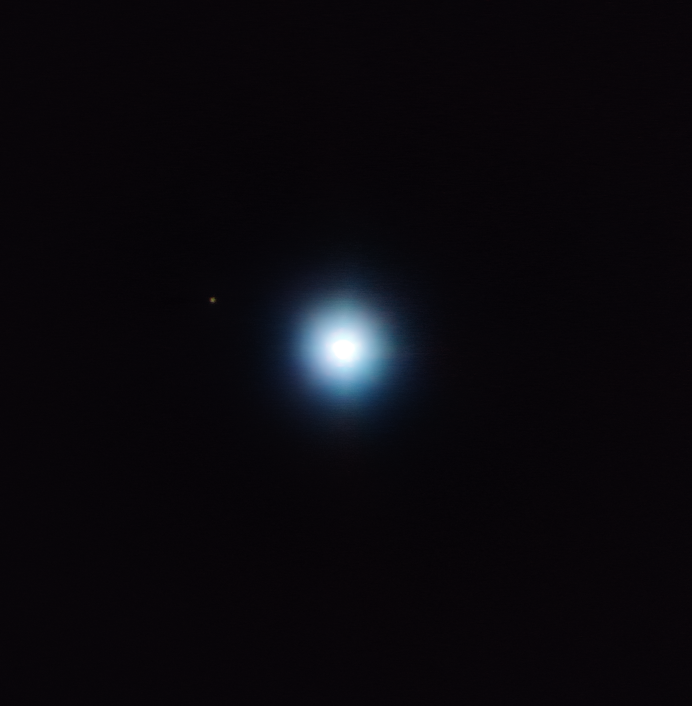
- VLT image of CVSO 30 and its planet candidate, CVSO 30 c

Observation data Epoch J2000.0 Equinox ICRS
- Constellation: Orion
- Right ascension: 05^{h} 25^{m} 07.557^{s}
- Declination: +01° 34′ 24.36″
- Apparent magnitude (V): +16.26

Characteristics
- Evolutionary stage: pre-main sequence
- Spectral type: M3
- Variable type: T Tau

Astrometry
Proper motion (μ)	RA: +1.274 mas/yr Dec.: −0.364 mas/yr
Parallax (π)	2.9503±0.0372 mas
Distance	1,110 ± 10 ly (339 ± 4 pc)

Details
Mass	0.39 ± 0.05 M_{☉}
Radius	1.39 R_{☉}
Temperature	3470 K
Age	2.65 Myr

Other designations
- 2MASS J05250755+0134243, PTFO 8-8695

Database references
SIMBAD	data

CVSO 30 (PTFO 8-8695) is a suspected binary T Tauri star, located in constellation Orion at 1110 light years (340 pc) from Earth with one candidate planet called CVSO 30 c. The candidate planet is a gas giant. The star is named after the CIDA Variability Survey of Orion (CVSO) and the Palomar Transient Factory (PTF) and is within the 25 Ori group close to the well known Orion's belt.

== Planetary system ==
The CVSO 30 planetary system
Companion (in order from star)	Mass	Semimajor axis (AU)	Orbital period (years)	Eccentricity	Inclination (°)	Radius
c (unconfirmed)	4.7 ^{+5.5}_{−2.0} M_{J}	660	27000	—	—	1.63 ^{+0.87}_{−0.34} R_{J}

CVSO 30 may have one planet called CVSO 30 c. CVSO 30 c is calculated to have a period of 27,000 years and a semimajor axis of 660 AU.

Direct imaging of the suspected CVSO 30 c, with a calculated mass equal to 4.7 Jupiter's, has been achieved through photometric and spectroscopic high contrast observations carried out with the Very Large Telescope located in Chile, the Keck Observatory in Hawaii and the Calar Alto Observatory in Spain. However, the colors of the object strongly suggest that it may actually be a background star, such as a K-type giant or a M-type subdwarf, while previously presented spectroscopic data were not taken into account.

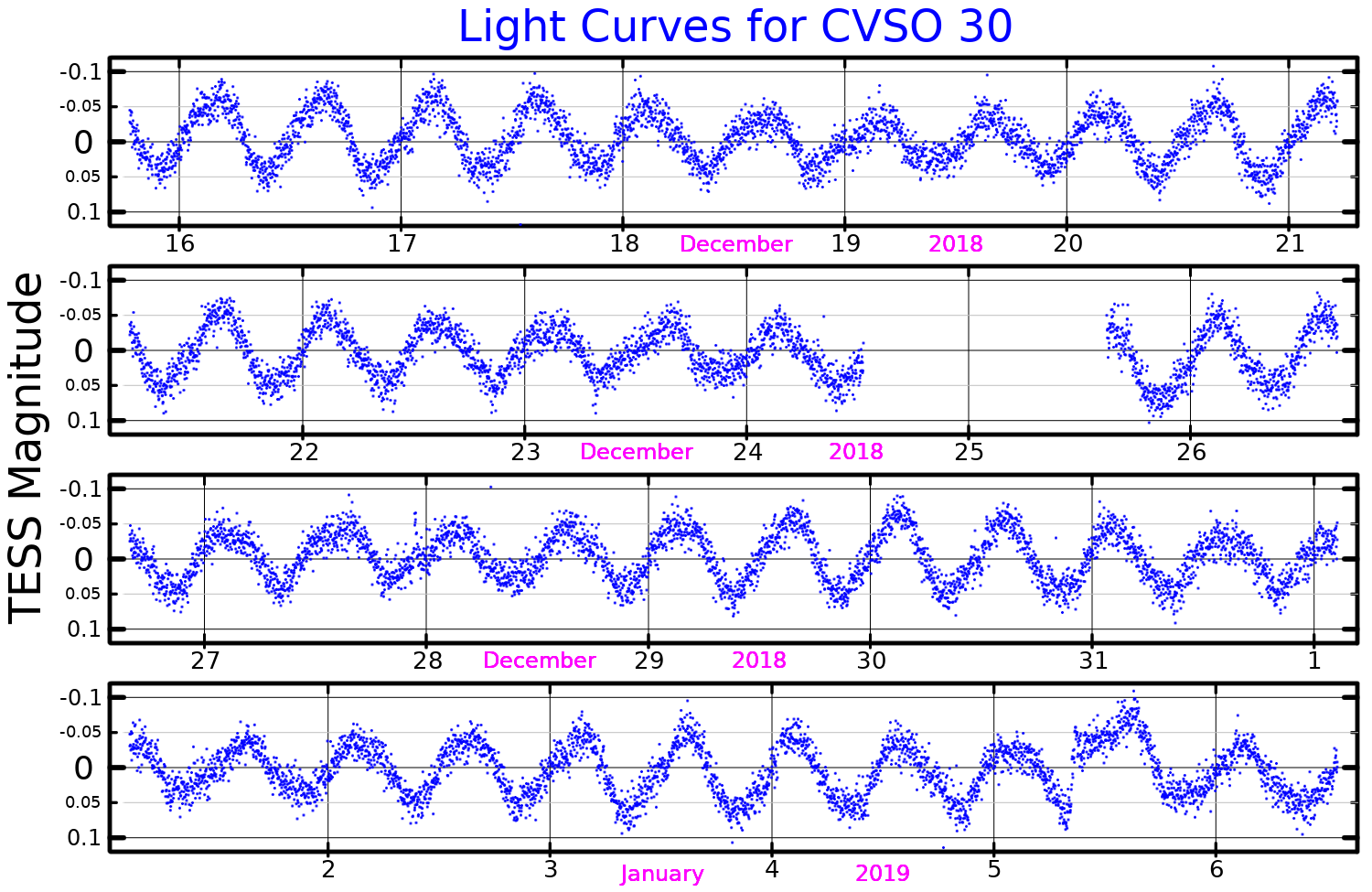
Light curves for CVSO 30, adapted from Koen (2021)

By 2020, the phase of "dips" caused by suspected planet CVSO 30 b had drifted nearly 180 degrees from the expected value, thus ruling out the existence of the planet. Instead, a rare type of stellar starspot activity with very large starspots is now suspected. Also, CVSO 30 is suspected to be a stellar binary, with the previously reported planetary orbital period equal to the rotation period of the companion star. Further investigation of "dips" by 2022 led to hypothesis of a large gas cloud close to synchronous orbit, dust would likely sublimate.
