= 2MASS J0441+2301 =

Young star system in the constellation Taurus

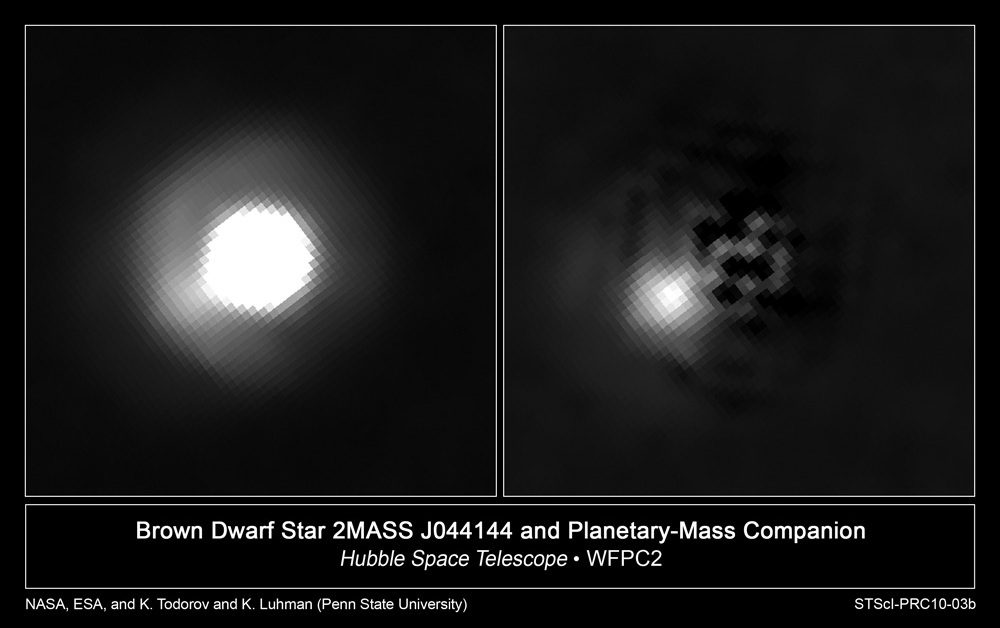
- 2MASS J04414489+2301513 is a brown dwarf with a companion about 5–10 times the mass of Jupiter.

Observation data Epoch J2000 Equinox ICRS
- Constellation: Taurus
- 2MASS J04414489+2301513 (2M J044144 B)
- Right ascension: 04^{h} 41^{m} 44.898^{s}
- Declination: +23° 01′ 51.39″
- 2MASS J04414565+2301580 (2M J044145 A)
- Right ascension: 04^{h} 41^{m} 45.652^{s}
- Declination: +23° 01′ 58.07″
- Apparent magnitude (V): 15.20

Characteristics
- Spectral type: M4.5/M8.5
- Variable type: T Tau

Astrometry

2MASS J04414489+2301513 (2M 044144)
Proper motion (μ)	RA: 7.918 mas/yr Dec.: -20.152 mas/yr
Parallax (π)	8.1822±0.3044 mas
Distance	400 ± 10 ly (122 ± 5 pc)

2MASS J04414565+2301580 (2M 044145)
Proper motion (μ)	RA: 7.914 mas/yr Dec.: -22.086 mas/yr
Parallax (π)	8.0887±0.0713 mas
Distance	403 ± 4 ly (124 ± 1 pc)

Details

Aa
Mass	0.2+0.1 −0.05 M_{☉}
Radius	1.1±0.2 R_{☉}
Luminosity	0.138+0.026 −0.032 L_{☉}
Temperature	3400 K

Ab
Mass	35±5 M_{Jup}
Radius	3.60 (Note: Based on the estimated temperature and luminosity via the Stefan-Boltzmann law.) R_{Jup}
Luminosity	7.41+1.41 −1.71 × 10^{-3} L_{☉}
Temperature	2800 K

Ba
Mass	19±3 M_{Jup}
Radius	4.34 R_{Jup}
Luminosity	3.47+0.65 −0.80 × 10^{-3} L_{☉}
Temperature	2100 K

Bb
Mass	9.8±1.8 M_{Jup}
Radius	3.05 R_{Jup}
Luminosity	9.33+1.75 −2.15 × 10^{-4} L_{☉}
Temperature	1800 K

Other designations
- WDS J04417+2302AB
- 2MASS J04414565+2301580: ATO J070.4402+23.0326, TIC 118893901, UCAC2 39972132, UCAC4 566-011236, UGCS J044145.65+230158.0, WISE J044145.65+230157.8, WISEA J044145.65+230157.7, Gaia DR3 146487560507840768, Gaia DR2 146487560507840768
- 2MASS J04414489+2301513: Gaia DR3 146487556211644544, Gaia DR2 146487556211644544, UGCS J044144.89+230151.3, USNO-B1.0 1130-00071517, TIC 118893899

Database references
SIMBAD	2M J044144
- 2M J044145

2MASS J0441+2301 (abbreviated as 2M 0441+23) is a young quadruple system hosting a planetary-mass object, a red dwarf star and two brown dwarfs, approximately 470 light years (145 parsecs) away.

The 2MASS J04414489+2301513 Bab (abbreviated as 2M J044144) primary (a brown dwarf) has a large separation (12.4 arcseconds) companion, 2MASS J04414565+2301580 Aab (abbreviated as 2M J044145), which in turn has a nearby small separation substellar companion (separation of 0.23 arcseconds to the northeast). 2M J044145 has similar proper motion to 2M J044144 and is likely physically associated with the system. The entire system of 4 objects is then a hierarchical quadruple of two binary objects orbiting each other. The primary component Aa has a spectral type of M4.5 and a red apparent magnitude of 14.2. Both components seem to be accreting mass from their stellar disks, as shown by their emission lines. The four objects have a total mass of only 26% of the Sun, making it the quadruple star system with the lowest mass known.

== Planetary system ==
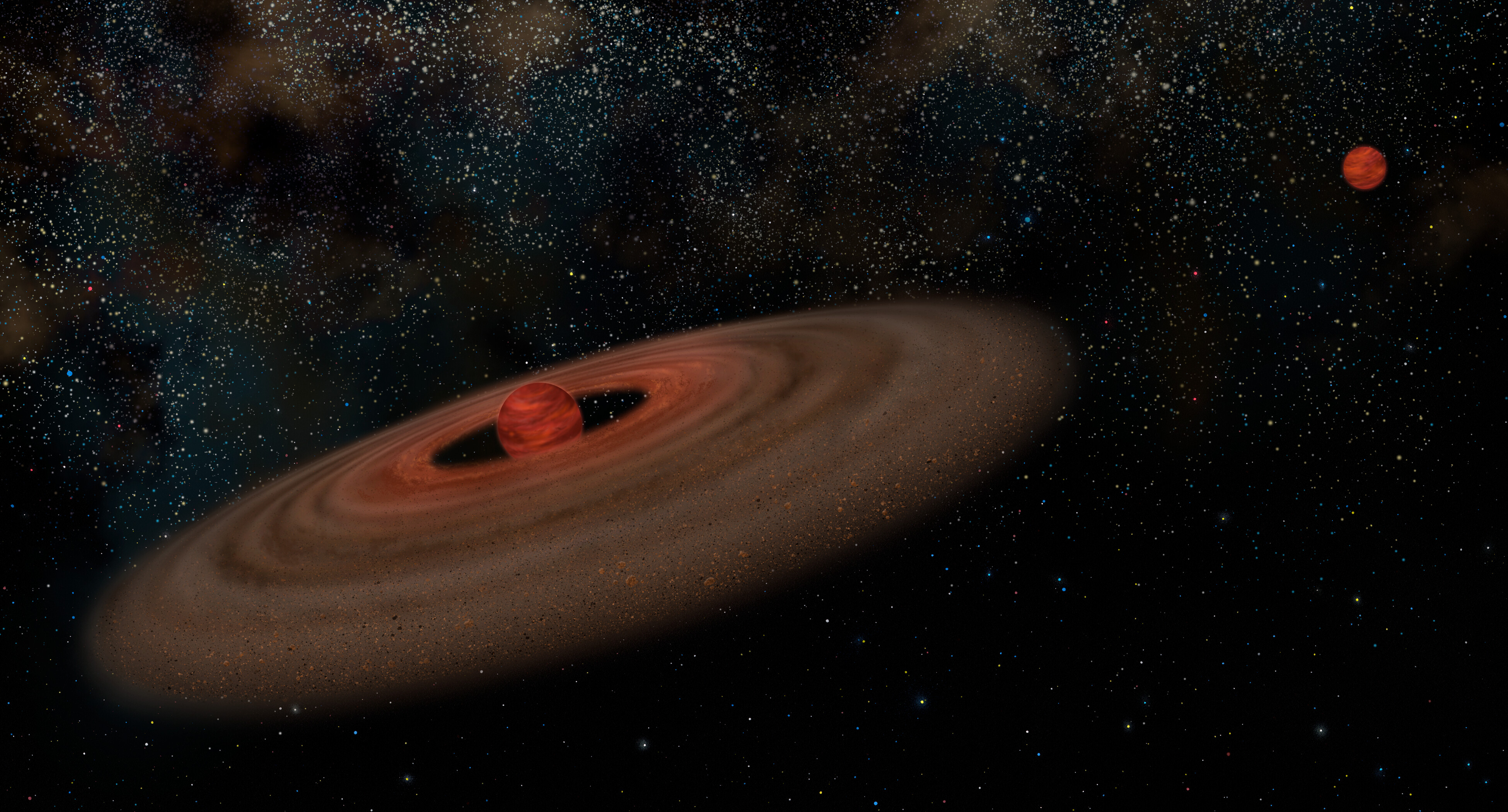
Artist's impression of the 2M 0441+23 system

The primary is orbited by a companion about 5–10 times the mass of Jupiter. The mass of the primary brown dwarf is roughly 20 times the mass of Jupiter and its age is roughly one million years. It is not clear whether this companion object is a sub-brown dwarf or a planet. The companion is very large with respect to its parent and must have formed within 1 million years or so, apparently too big and too fast to form like a regular planet from a disk around the central object. It also fails the mass ratio criterion of the IAU definition of an exoplanet; the mass ratio with the primary is closer than 1/25. Nevertheless, it is still considered a planet by the NASA Exoplanet Archive and Extrasolar Planets Encyclopaedia.

The 2M J044144 planetary system
Companion (in order from star)	Mass	Semimajor axis (AU)	Orbital period (years)	Eccentricity	Inclination (°)	Radius
b	9.8±1.8 M_{J}	15±0.6	411	—	—	3.05 R_{J}

== See also ==
- 2MASS
- SCR 1845−6357
- 2M1207
- HR 8799
