= 14 Herculis =

Star in the constellation Hercules

Observation data Epoch J2000.0 Equinox ICRS
- Constellation: Hercules
- Right ascension: 16^{h} 10^{m} 24.31568^{s}
- Declination: +43° 49′ 03.5074″
- Apparent magnitude (V): +6.61

Characteristics
- Spectral type: K0 V
- B−V color index: 0.877±0.006

Astrometry
Radial velocity (R_{v})	−13.87±0.08 km/s
Proper motion (μ)	RA: 131.745(28) mas/yr Dec.: −297.025(37) mas/yr
Parallax (π)	55.8657±0.0291 mas
Distance	58.38 ± 0.03 ly (17.900 ± 0.009 pc)
Absolute magnitude (M_{V})	+5.39

Details
Mass	0.98±0.04 M_{☉}
Radius	0.97±0.02 R_{☉}
Luminosity	0.6256±0.0077 L_{☉}
Surface gravity (log g)	4.46 cgs
Temperature	5,310±30 K
Metallicity [Fe/H]	0.43±0.07 dex
Rotation	29.5 d
Rotational velocity (v sin i)	1.65 km/s
Age	3.6±2.0 Gyr

Other designations
- 14 Her, BD+44°2549, GJ 614, HD 145675, HIP 79248, SAO 45933, LTT 14816

Database references
SIMBAD	data
Exoplanet Archive	data

14 Herculis or 14 Her is a K-type main-sequence star 58.4 light-years (17.9 parsecs) away in the constellation Hercules. It is also known as HD 145675. Because of its apparent magnitude, of 6.61 the star can be very faintly seen with the naked eye. As of 2021, 14 Herculis is known to host two exoplanets.

== Stellar properties ==
14 Herculis is an orange dwarf star of the spectral type K0V. The star has about 98 percent of the mass, 97 percent of the radius, and only 67 percent of the luminosity of the Sun. The star appears to be 2.7 times as enriched with elements heavier than hydrogen (based on its abundance of iron), in comparison to the Sun. It may have been the most metal rich star known as of 2001.

== Planetary system ==
In 1998 a planet, 14 Herculis b was discovered orbiting 14 Herculis via radial velocity. This was formally published in 2003. The planet has an eccentric orbit with a period of 4.8 years. In 2005, a possible second planet was proposed, designated 14 Herculis c. The parameters of this planet were very uncertain, but an initial analysis suggested that it was in the 4:1 resonance with the inner planet, with an orbital period of almost 19 years at an orbital distance of 6.9 AU. The existence of the planet 14 Herculis c was confirmed in 2021, along with a rough orbit determination.

A 2021 study combining radial velocity and astrometry found that the planetary orbits are not coplanar, which may indicate a strong planet-planet scattering event in the past. Albeit one study using astrometry has found inclinations consistent with aligned orbits, newer research including James Webb Space Telescope observations confirm the orbits are misaligned. The planets are strongly interacting with each other. Their inclinations and eccentricities oscillate due to these gravitational interactions.

There are signs of a third candidate planet with a period of about 10 years, but this signal is most likely related to the star's magnetic activity cycle.

The outer planet, 14 Herculis c, was directly imaged with the James Webb Space Telescope, re-determining its orbital elements and finding a temperature of 275 K (2 °C), among the lowest known for a directly imaged planet. Its apparent brightness is fainter than expected, hinting at disequilibrium chemistry and/or water ice clouds.

The 14 Herculis planetary system
Companion (in order from star)	Mass	Semimajor axis (AU)	Orbital period (years)	Eccentricity	Inclination (°)	Radius
b	8.9+1.1 −1.5 M_{J}	2.84±0.04	4.8285+0.0022 −0.0023	0.371±0.003	147.3+2.2 −2.7	—
c	7.9+1.6 −1.2 M_{J}	28.1+6.4 −6.8	143±3	0.64+0.06 −0.10	111.9+5.4 −4.5	1.03±0.01 R_{J}

== See also ==
- 47 Ursae Majoris
- List of stars in Hercules
