= CHXR 73 =

Star in the constellation Chamaleon

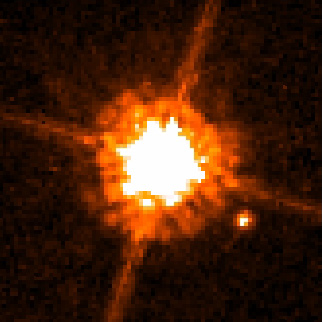
- HST image of CHXR 73 and its companion

Observation data Epoch J2000.0 Equinox ICRS
- Constellation: Chamaeleon
- Right ascension: 11^{h} 06^{m} 28.7626^{s}
- Declination: −77° 37′ 33.1444″

Characteristics
- Spectral type: M3

Astrometry
Proper motion (μ)	RA: −22.193±0.233 mas/yr Dec.: 0.215±0.206 mas/yr
Parallax (π)	5.2343±0.1759 mas
Distance	620 ± 20 ly (191 ± 6 pc)

Details
Mass	0.32 ± 0.11 M_{☉}
Radius	0.83 ± 0.04 R_{☉}
Luminosity	0.09 ± 0.07 L_{☉}
Temperature	3490 ± 180 K
Age	2±1 Myr

Other designations
- 2MASS J11062877-7737331

Database references
SIMBAD	data

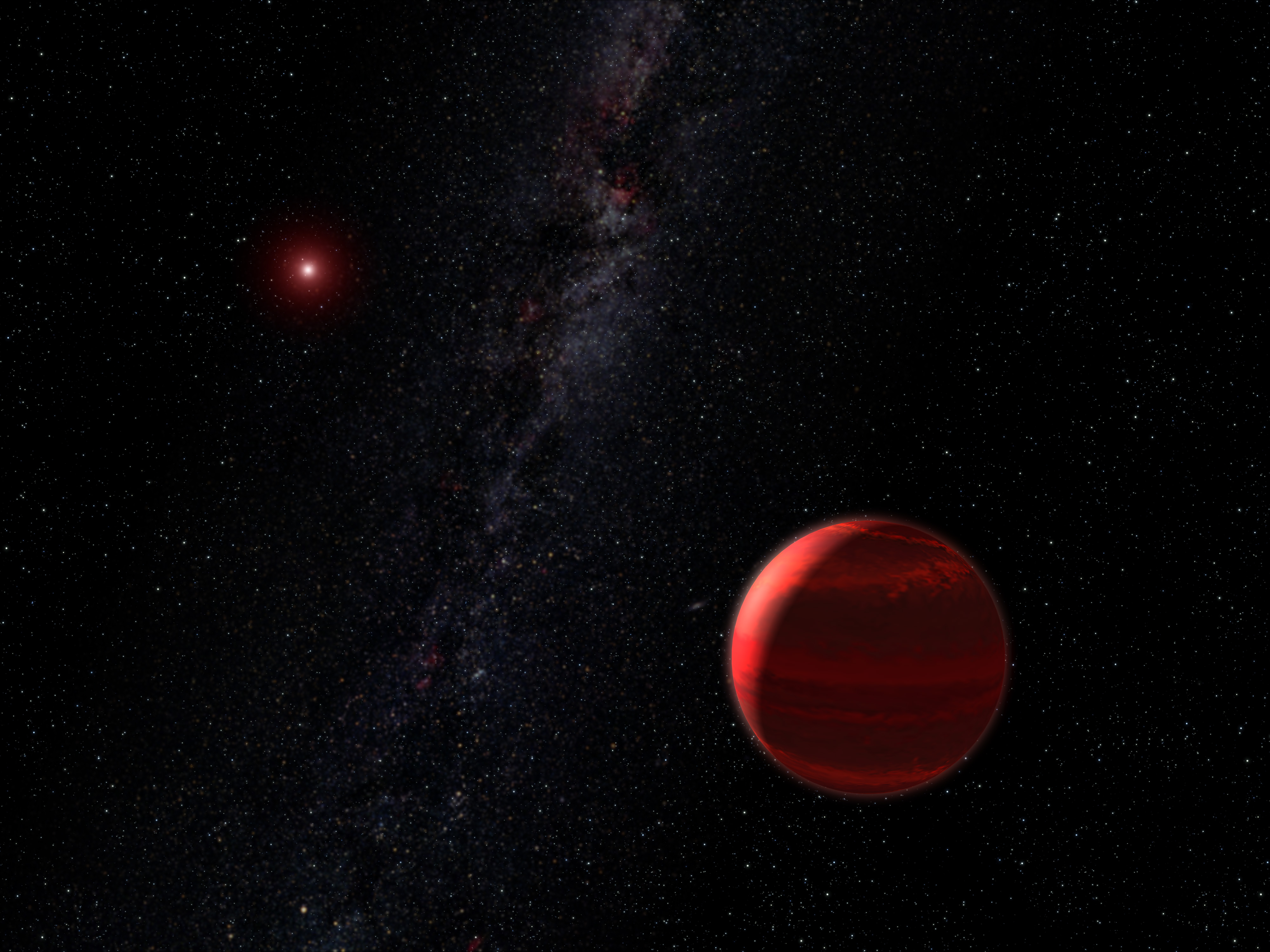
Artist's impression of CHXR 73 and its planet

CHXR 73 is a star in the constellation Chamaeleon, about 620 light-years away from Earth.

The star is located within Cha I, a molecular cloud. It has a low temperature of 3,490 K typical of red dwarfs, but unlike typical red dwarfs it has an unusually large radius of 0.83 R_{☉}—this is because of its young age, only 8 million years.

== Planetary system ==
A companion, CHXR 73 b, has been found via direct imaging. CHXR 73 has a mass of about 12 Jupiters. This is close to the theoretical boundary between planets and brown dwarfs, making its classification difficult.

The CHXR 73 planetary system
Companion (in order from star)	Mass	Semimajor axis (AU)	Orbital period (days)	Eccentricity	Inclination (°)	Radius
b	13±6 M_{J}	210	—	—	—	—
