= HD 203030 =

K-type main sequence star in the constellation Vulpecula

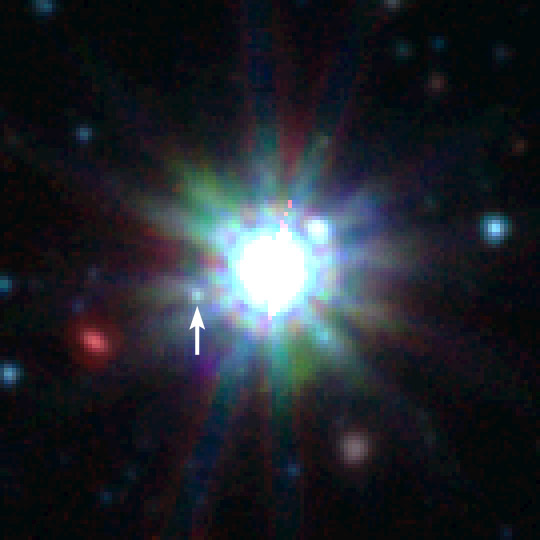
- HD 203030 and its companion (white arrow) with Spitzer IRAC.

Observation data Epoch J2000.0 (ICRS) Equinox ICRS
- Constellation: Vulpecula
- Right ascension: 21^{h} 18^{m} 58.220^{s}
- Declination: +26° 13′ 49.96″
- Apparent magnitude (V): 8.45

Characteristics
- Evolutionary stage: main sequence
- Spectral type: K0V
- B−V color index: 0.750±0.015
- Variable type: BY Dra

Astrometry
Radial velocity (R_{v})	−16.92±0.26 km/s
Proper motion (μ)	RA: 133.593±0.108 mas/yr Dec.: 9.563±0.11 mas/yr
Parallax (π)	25.4488±0.0610 mas
Distance	128.2 ± 0.3 ly (39.29 ± 0.09 pc)
Absolute magnitude (M_{V})	5.436±0.030

Details
Mass	0.965±0.035 M_{☉}
Radius	0.86^{+0.02}_{−0.03} R_{☉}
Luminosity	0.593±0.002 L_{☉}
Surface gravity (log g)	4.64+0.03 −0.01 cgs
Temperature	5,603+10 −8 K
Metallicity [Fe/H]	0.06±0.07 dex 0.30+0.02 −0.01 dex
Rotational velocity (v sin i)	5.62+0.13 −0.14 km/s
Age	100^{+50}_{−70} Myr

Other designations
- V457 Vul, HD 203030, HIP 105232, WDS 21190+2614, LTT 4041, TYC 2190-1095-1, 2MASS J21185820+2613500, Gaia DR2 1846882224145757056

Database references
SIMBAD	data
Exoplanet Archive	data

HD 203030, also known as V457 Vulpeculae, is a single, yellow-orange hued star with a sub-stellar companion in the northern constellation of Vulpecula. The designation HD 203030 is from the Henry Draper Catalogue, which is based on spectral classifications made between 1911 and 1915 by Annie Jump Cannon and her co-workers, and was published between 1918 and 1924. This star is invisible to the naked eye, having an apparent visual magnitude of 8.45. It is located at a distance of 128 light years from the Sun based on parallax, and is drifting closer with a radial velocity of −17 km/s.

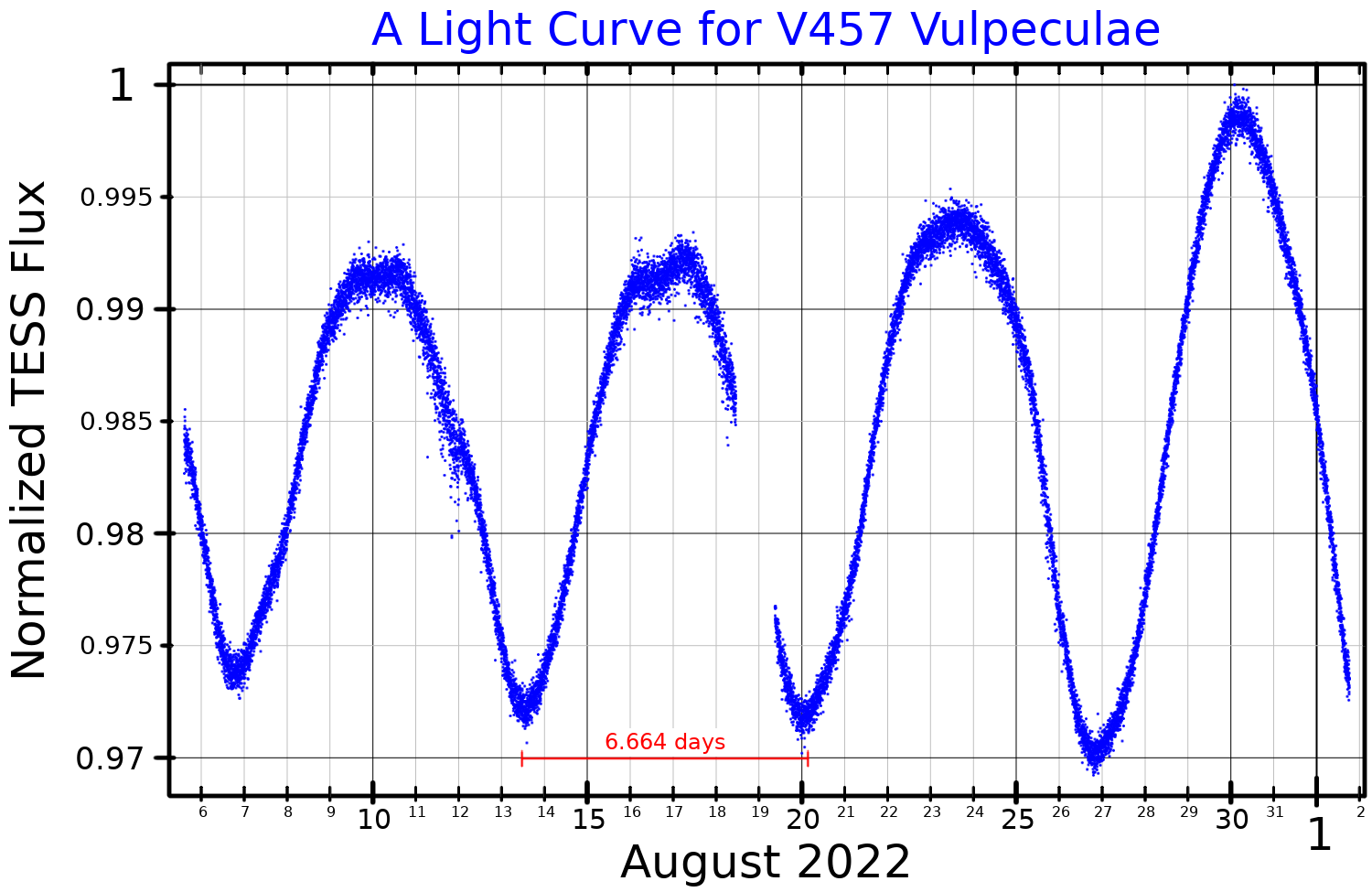
A light curve for V457 Vulpeculae, plotted from TESS data. The period listed in the GCVS is marked in red.

The stellar classification of HD 203030 is K0V, indicating this is a K-type main-sequence star. It is likely very young, belonging to the 45 million years old IC 2391 open cluster. In the year 2000, Klaus G. Strassmeier et al. published their discovery that the star's brightness varies. Based on photometric measurements by Hipparcos, it was found to exhibit low amplitude periodic variability with a range of 0.0139 in magnitude and a period of 4.14 days. However the General Catalog of Variable Stars lists its period as 6.664 days, which is the period from the Strassmeier et al. paper. It is now classified as a chromospherically active BY Draconis variable. The star has 97% of the mass of the Sun and 86% of the Sun's radius. It is radiating 59% of the luminosity of the Sun from its photosphere at an effective temperature of 5,603 K.

== Planetary system ==
In 2006, direct imaging found co-moving companion at a projected separation of 487.1±1.8 AU, suggesting this is a candidate brown dwarf of spectral class L7.5. It was shown to be in a bound orbit around the star by 2014. In 2017, a reanalysis indicated that the star HD 203030 is probably very young, and therefore both the primary and the observed companion are less massive than previously thought. This places the companion object at the planetary mass boundary. In 2019, the rotational period of HD 203030 B was measured as 7.5^{+0.6}_{−0.5} hours, and a patchy cloud cover was detected.

The HD 203030 planetary system
Companion (in order from star)	Mass	Semimajor axis (AU)	Orbital period (days)	Eccentricity	Inclination (°)	Radius
B	11^{+4}_{−3} M_{J}	487	—	—	—	1.27 ^{+0.06}_{−0.04} R_{J}
