= AB Pictoris =

Star in the constellation Pictor

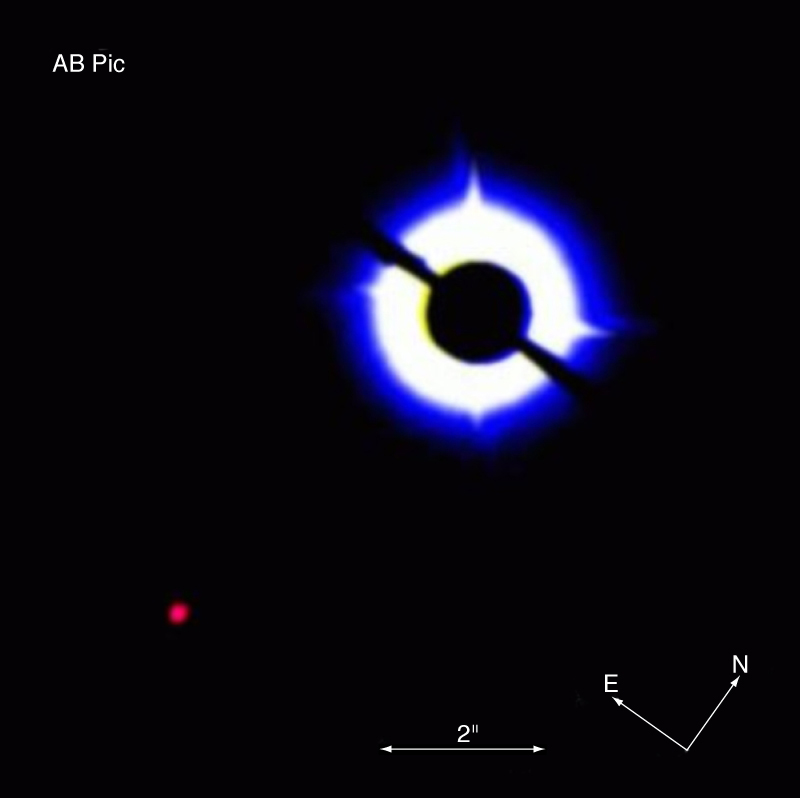
- Coronagraphic image of AB Pictoris showing its tiny companion (bottom left). The data was obtained on 16 March 2003 with NACO on the VLT, using a 1.4 arcsec occulting mask on top of AB Pictoris.

Observation data Epoch J2000.0 Equinox ICRS
- Constellation: Pictor
- Right ascension: 06^{h} 19^{m} 12.913^{s}
- Declination: −58° 03′ 15.53″
- Apparent magnitude (V): 9.13

Characteristics
- Evolutionary stage: main sequence
- Spectral type: K1V(e)
- B−V color index: 0.861±0.027
- Variable type: BY Dra

Astrometry
Radial velocity (R_{v})	22.6±0.3 km/s
Proper motion (μ)	RA: 14.314±0.015 mas/yr Dec.: 45.234±0.017 mas/yr
Parallax (π)	19.9452±0.0124 mas
Distance	163.5 ± 0.1 ly (50.14 ± 0.03 pc)
Absolute magnitude (M_{V})	5.82

Details
Mass	0.90±0.10 M_{☉}
Radius	0.92±0.03 R_{☉}
Luminosity	0.51 L_{☉}
Surface gravity (log g)	4.40±0.09 cgs
Temperature	5,006±81 K
Metallicity	$\begin{smallmatrix}\left[\ce{M}/\ce{H}\right]\end{smallmatrix}$ = −0.07±0.05
Rotation	3.90±0.08 d
Rotational velocity (v sin i)	10.87±0.08 km/s
Age	13.3+1.1 −0.6 or 28±11 Myr

Other designations
- AB Pic, CD−58 1409, CPD−58 670, HD 44627A, 44627, HIP 30034, SAO 234448, PPM 335089

Database references
SIMBAD	data

AB Pictoris (abbreviated AB Pic, also catalogued as HD 44627) is a K-type main-sequence star, located 163.5 light-years away in the southern constellation of Pictor. It was initially identified as a member of the young (30 million years old) Tucana–Horologium association, but later shown to be part of the Carina association. The star has been classified as a BY Draconis variable, indicating it has an active chromosphere. It is an X-ray source and displays emission lines in its spectrum.

In 2005 it was announced that an astronomical object (AB Pictoris b, abbreviated AB Pic b) had been imaged in 2003 and 2004 close to and apparently in orbit around the star. Its mass suggests that it is at the borderline between being a brown dwarf or a planet.

== Planetary system ==
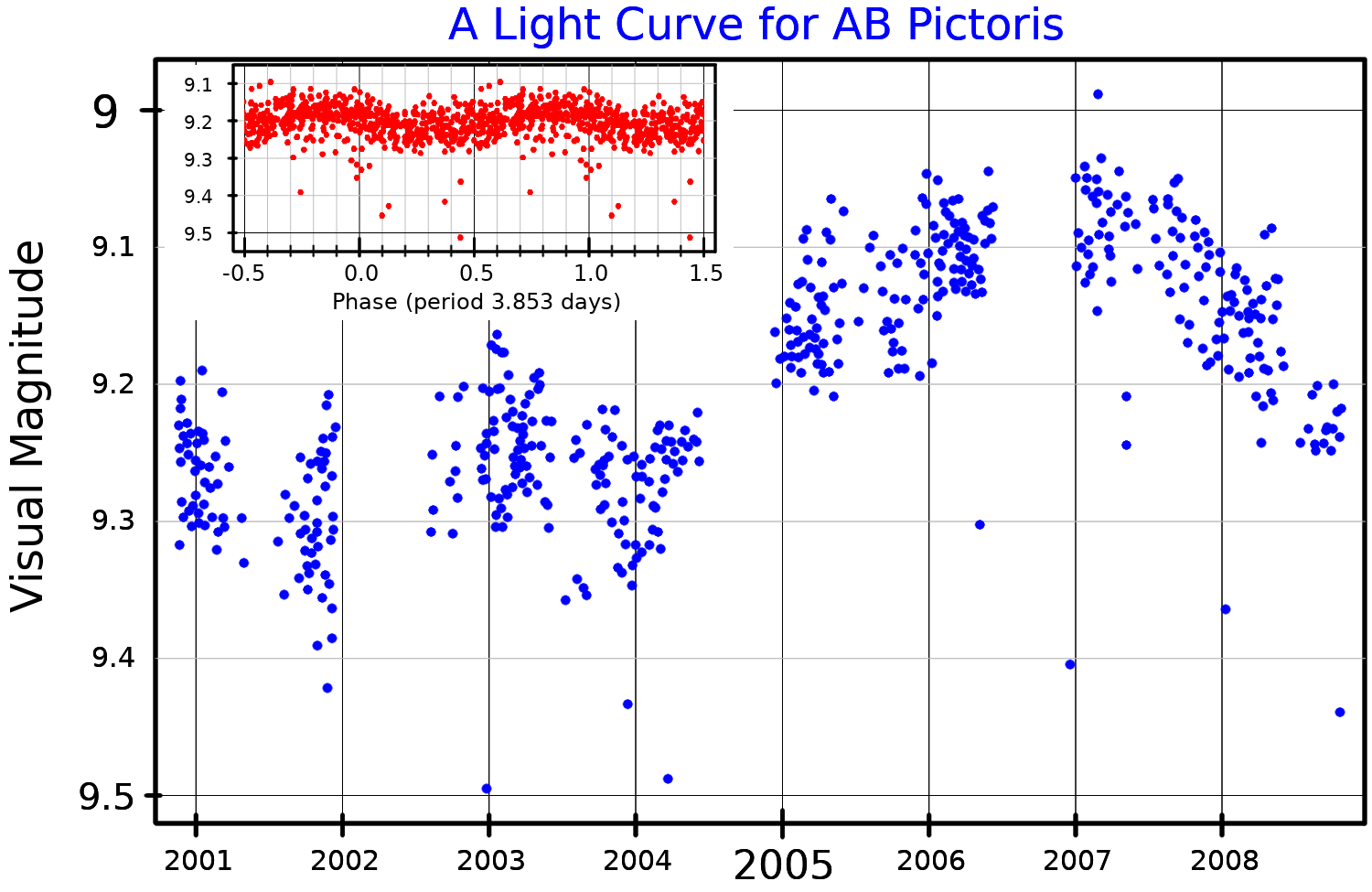
A visual band light curve for AB Pictoris. The main plot shows the long-term variability, and the inset plot shows the periodic variation. Adapted from Kiraga (2012)

In 2003 and 2004, an object (now catalogued as AB Pictoris b) was observed close to the star by a team of astronomers at the European Southern Observatory. Since it had common proper motion with AB Pictoris, it was concluded that it was physically close to the star. Its spectral type was estimated as between L0V and L3V.

Using evolutionary models, the companion's mass was initially estimated as from 13 to 14 Jupiter masses. However, because modelling such young objects was difficult at the time, this estimate is very uncertain; some models give masses as low as 11 Jupiter masses or as high as 70 Jupiter masses. As it is not known if the mass of the object exceeds the deuterium burning limit of 13 Jupiter masses, it is not clear whether the object should be classified as an extrasolar planet or a brown dwarf. Later measurements gave lower masses of 9.1±1.1 and 10.5±2.1 M_{J} in 2025, and 10±1 M_{J} in 2022, assuming an age of 13.3 Myr based on membership to the Carina association. These values are well within the planetary-mass regime. However, one 2024 study re-determined the age of the Carina association to 28±11 Myr, yielding a larger mass of 12.9+0.3
−1.0 M_{J} that may be over the deuterium limit. A dynamical mass measurement was presented in 2026, yielding a value of 10+24
−8 M_{J} that does not constrain the status of AB Pictoris b.

Initial temperature estimates varied from 1600 K to 2400 K. In 2010 a team obtained the spectrum of AB Pic b with VLT/SINFONI. This confirmed this object as an L-dwarf with low surface gravity, matching a spectral type of L0-L1. It also constrained the temperature to 2000+100
−300 Kelvin. One 2012 study found that AB Pic b has a lower temperature of 1400-1700 K and possibly a lower mass (7-14 M_{J}, from figure 13). A 2014 analysis did find a temperature of 1800+100
−200 K and a mass of 10-14 M_{J}. The planet shows several molecular and atomic absorption lines in the spectrum. The most notable are water vapor, carbon monoxide, potassium and sodium. The planetary orbit is significantly misaligned with its spin axis orientation (obliquity), possibly due to gravitational interactions with the additional inner planet.

An additional planet, AB Pictoris c, was first suspected by combining direct imaging, radial velocity and the astrometric acceleration from AB Pic A. The planet was confirmed in 2025 with a re-analysis of the Gaia excess noise and the proper motion anomaly.

The planetary system
Companion (in order from star)	Mass	Semimajor axis (AU)	Orbital period (years)	Eccentricity	Inclination (°)	Radius
c	2.5–9 M_{J}	3–5	—	—	—	—
b	10+24 −8 M_{J}	237+155 −55	3,800+3,600 −1,400	0.54+0.32 −0.28	95.2+8.3 −6.5	1.53±0.03 R_{J}

== See also ==
- Beta Pictoris
- GQ Lupi
- List of exoplanets discovered between 2000–2009 - including AB Pictoris b
- List of exoplanets discovered in 2025 - including AB Pictoris c
