= CT Chamaeleontis =

Star in the constellation Chamaleon

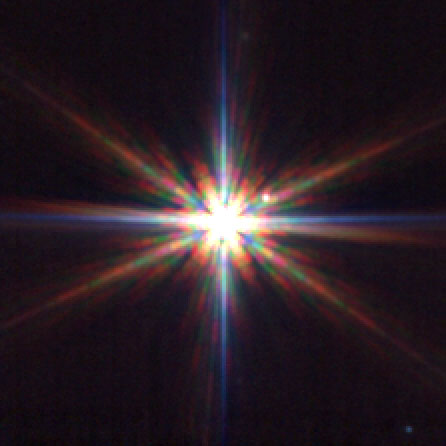
- CT Chamaeleontis and its companion (faint object on the upper right near the star); Credit: NASA/ESA/CSA JWST; Ya-Lin Wu et al.; processing: Meli_thev

Observation data Epoch J2000.0 Equinox ICRS
- Constellation: Chamaeleon
- Right ascension: 11^{h} 04^{m} 09.0989^{s}
- Declination: −76° 27′ 19.330″
- Apparent magnitude (V): 11.7 to 12.9

Characteristics
- Evolutionary stage: pre-main sequence
- Spectral type: K7 Ve
- Variable type: T Tauri

Astrometry
Radial velocity (R_{v})	15.13±0.09 km/s
Proper motion (μ)	RA: −22.223 mas/yr Dec.: +0.019 mas/yr
Parallax (π)	5.2645±0.0116 mas
Distance	620 ± 1 ly (190.0 ± 0.4 pc)

Details
Mass	0.85±0.02 or 0.96±0.02 M_{☉}
Radius	2.06±0.05 R_{☉}
Luminosity	1.41+0.17 −0.16 L_{☉}
Surface gravity (log g)	3.66±0.01 cgs
Temperature	4,403+6 −10 K
Metallicity [Fe/H]	−0.56±0.01 dex
Rotational velocity (v sin i)	13.97+0.10 −0.15 km/s
Age	1.26+0.41 −0.23 to 3.51+0.38 −0.39 or 1.41+0.38 −0.30 Myr

Other designations
- CT Cha, 2MASS J11040909−7627193, IRAS 11027−7611, NSV 5081, WDS J11042−7627AB

Database references
SIMBAD	CT Cha
- CT Cha b

CT Chamaeleontis (CT Cha) is a T Tauri star in the constellation of Chamaeleon. The star belongs to Chamaeleon I, which is part of the Chamaeleon complex. It has an apparent visual magnitude which varies between 11.7 and 12.9.

== Characteristics ==
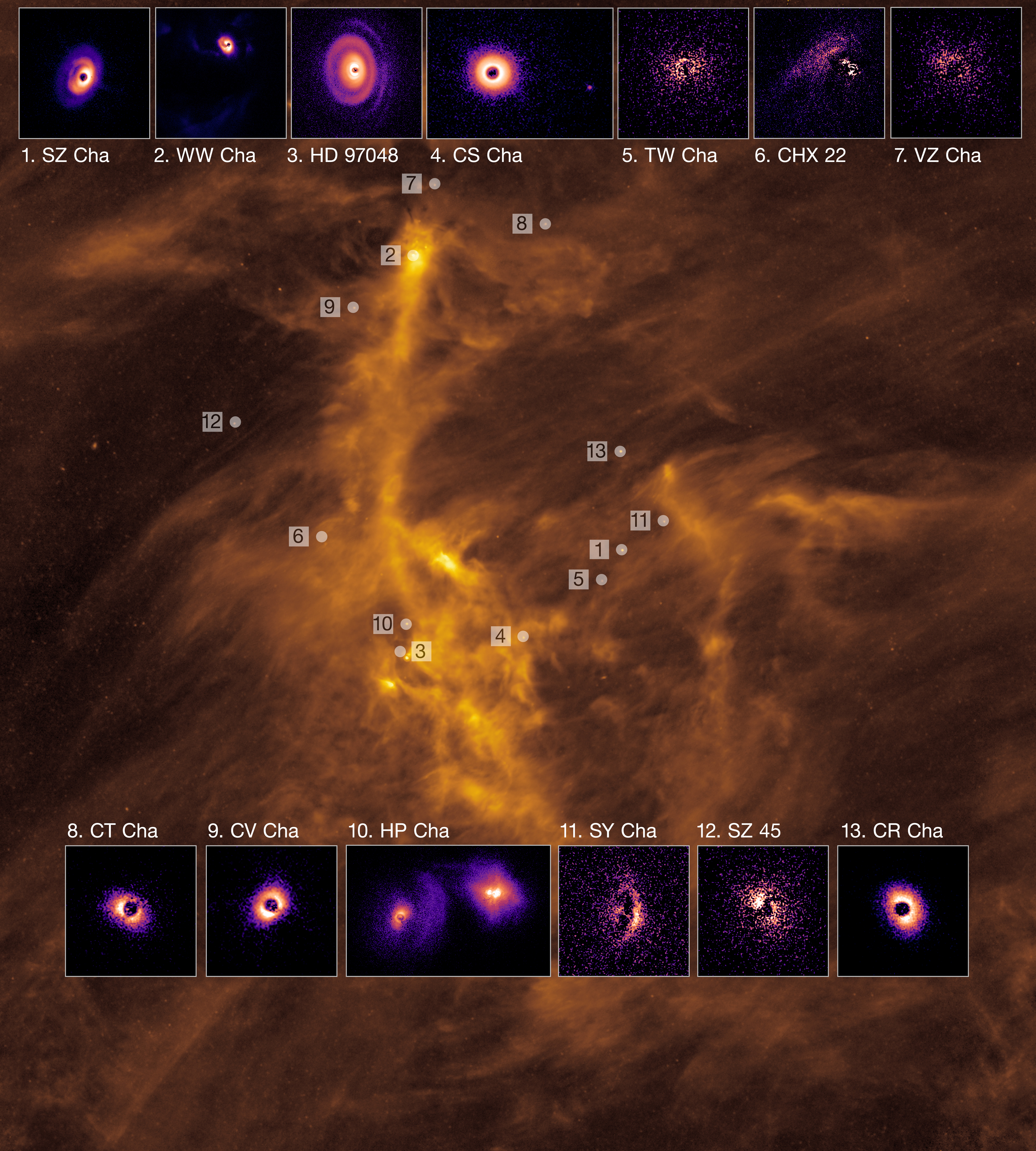
Disk around CT Cha with VLT/SPHERE

CT Chamaeleontis has a spectral type of K7Ve, indicating that it is a late K-type star with emission lines and a main sequence luminosity class, although it has not yet reached this stage of evolution yet, with an age likely between one and two million years. The star's mass has been obtained dynamically using the Keplerian rotation of its protoplanetary disk, yielding two values of 0.85±0.02 and 0.96±0.02 M_{☉}. It has a radius 2.06 times that of the Sun (R_{☉}) and is radiating 1.4 times the Sun's luminosity (L_{☉}) from its photosphere at an effective temperature of 4,403 K. The star's iron-to-hydrogen abundance is equivalent to only 27.5% that of the Sun.

Observations with the James Webb Space Telescope's Mid-Infrared Instrument did show that the disk around CT Cha A does not contain any carbon molecules. Emission lines of water and OH were identified. The low energy emission by water comes from cold (≲200 K (−73 °C; −100 °F)) water. The disk around the star was directly imaged with ALMA and VLT/SPHERE.

== Planetary system/Brown dwarf ==
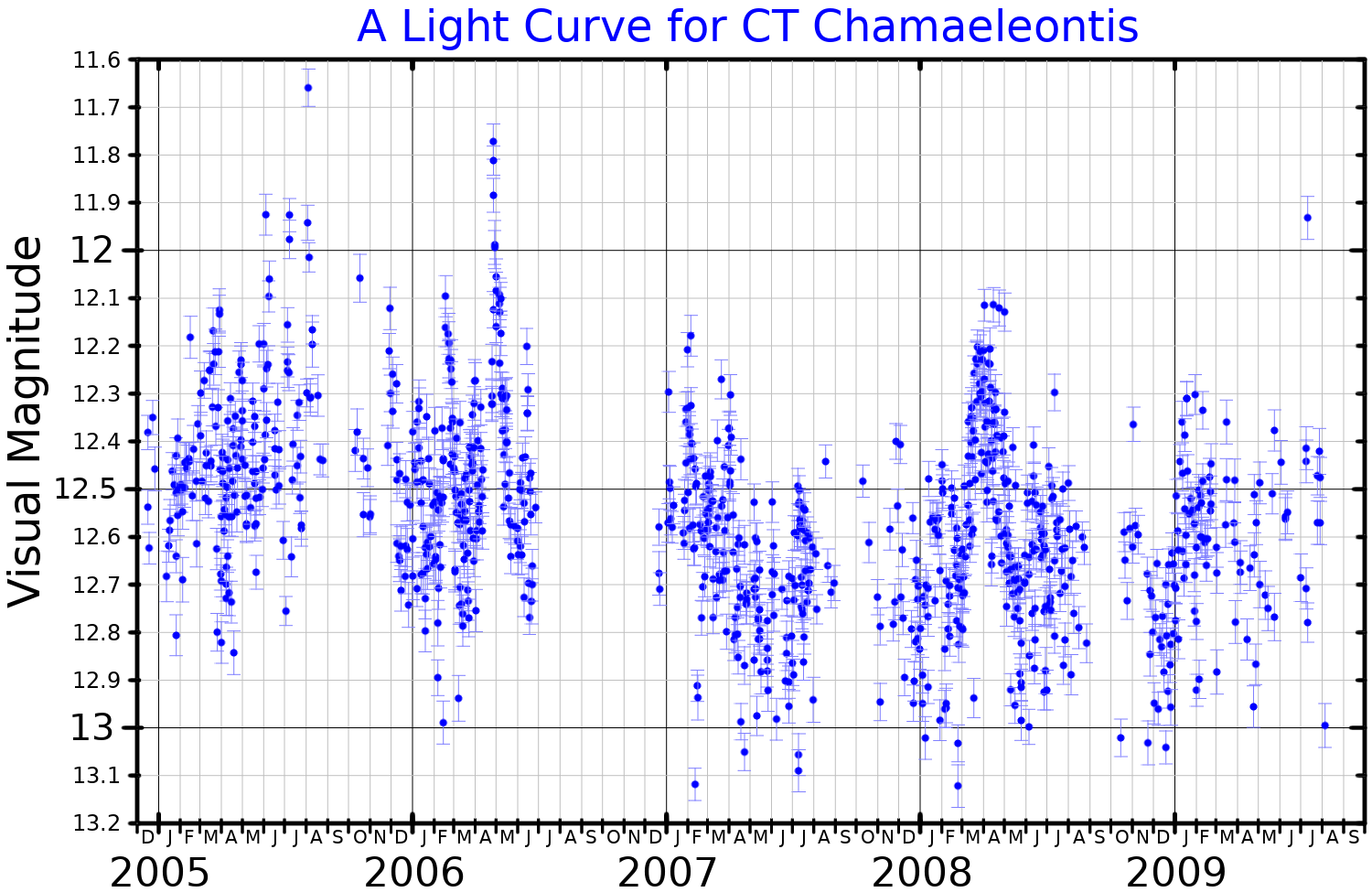
A visual band light curve for CT Chamaeleontis, plotted from ASAS data

In 2006 and 2007, a faint companion was observed 2.7 arcseconds away from CT Chamaeleontis, using the Very Large Telescope at the European Southern Observatory. Since the object shares common proper motion with CT Chamaeleontis, it is believed to be physically close to the star, with a projected separation of approximately 440 astronomical units. The companion has been either designated as CT Chamaeleontis b or as CT Chamaeleontis B, sometimes erroneously as low-mass star.

The companion's mass was estimated at 17±6 Jupiter masses (M_{J}) in 2008 and at 14–24 M_{J} in 2015. Since these values are likely to be above the deuterium burning limit, CT Cha b was considered to be likely a brown dwarf rather than an exoplanet. These mass estimates rely on the host star's age, which was estimated to be 2±2 million years in 2008 and between one and five million years in 2015. However, the age was later revised ranging from 1.26+0.41
−0.32 to 3.51+0.38
−0.39 million years, while best fitting being revised downwards, ranging from 1.26+0.41
−0.32 to 1.77+0.60
−0.49 million years. A recently assumed value of 1.41+0.38
−0.30 implies a mass of 9.7+1.2
−1.1 M_{J}, which is well within the planetary-mass regime.

Already during the discovery evidence of accretion from a gas-rich circumplanetary disk was suspected from emission by Paβ. Later it was found that the emission in the r-band is overluminous, indicating Hα emission. This team estimated an accretion rate of ~6 × 10^{−10} M_{☉}/yr. A search with ALMA failed to detect the disk around the companion. Observations with JWST MIRI medium resolution spectroscopy found that the disk is rich in carbon chemistry. Seven carbon-bearing molecules were found inside the disk. The following molecules were identified: acetylene (C_{2}H_{2}, ^{13}CCH_{2}), ethane (C_{2}H_{6}), propyne (C_{3}H_{4}), diacetylene (C_{4}H_{2}), benzene (C_{6}H_{6}), hydrogen cyanide (HCN) and carbon dioxide (CO_{2}). This carbon-rich disk is similar to disks around isolated planetary-mass objects and other low-mass objects that show a transition from oxygen-rich disk to carbon-rich disk in their lifetime. This result will give insights into the formation of exomoons around giant planets.

The CT Chamaeleontis planetary system
Companion (in order from star)	Mass	Semimajor axis (AU)	Orbital period (days)	Eccentricity	Inclination (°)	Radius
protoplanetary disk	6.1–9.3 AU				54.0+1.0 −0.9°	—
protoplanetary disk	64.6±4.2 AU				45.7±5.0°	—
b	9.7+1.2 −1.1 M_{J}	500+320 −150	—	0.59+0.28 −0.34	—	2.20+0.81 −0.60 R_{J}
