= List of largest exoplanets =

List of largest planets by size

Jupiter as seen by Voyager 1 in 1979. It is the largest planet having its surface resolved and it is the largest planet in the Solar System.

The following below is a list of the largest exoplanets so far discovered, in terms of physical size, ordered by radius.

== Limitations ==
This list of extrasolar objects may and will change over time due to diverging measurements published between scientific journals, varying methods used to examine these objects, and the notably difficult task of discovering extrasolar objects in general. These objects are not stars, and are quite small on a universal or even stellar scale. Furthermore, these objects might be brown dwarfs, sub-brown dwarfs, or not even exist at all. Some data from the older sources may be unreliable due to the advancement of technology. Because of this, this list only cites the most certain measurements to date and is prone to change.

=== Maximum mass limitation ===
Different space organisations have different maximum masses for exoplanets. The NASA Exoplanet Archive (NASA EA) states that an object with a minimum mass lower than 30 M_{J}, not being a free-floating object, is qualified as an exoplanet. On the other hand, the official working definition by the International Astronomical Union (IAU) allows only exoplanets with a maximum mass of 13 M_{J}, that are orbiting a host object at a mass ratio of less than 4% or 0.04. For the purpose of the comparison of large planets, this article includes several of those listed by NASA EA up to the maximum 30 M_{J} with possible brown dwarfs among them of ≳ 13 M_{J} as stated by IAU.

=== Classification of sub-brown dwarf and rogue objects ===
Sub-brown dwarfs are formed in the manner of stars, through the collapse of a gas cloud (perhaps with the help of photo-erosion) but have a planetary mass, therefore are by definition below the limiting mass for thermonuclear fusion of deuterium (~13 M_{J}). However, there is no consensus amongst astronomers on whether the formation process should be taken into account when classifying an object as a planet. Free-floating sub-brown dwarfs can be observationally indistinguishable from rogue planets, which originally formed around a star and were ejected from orbit. Similarly, a sub-brown dwarf formed free-floating in a star cluster may be captured into orbit around a star, making distinguishing sub-brown dwarfs and large planets also difficult. A definition for the term "sub-brown dwarf" was put forward by the IAU Working Group on Extra-Solar Planets (IAU WGESP), which defined it as a free-floating body found in young star clusters below the lower mass cut-off of brown dwarfs.

== List ==
The sizes are listed in units of Jupiter radii (R_{J}, 71 492 km). This list is designed to include all confirmed exoplanets that are larger than 1.6 times the size of Jupiter. Some well-known exoplanets that are smaller than 1.6 R_{J} (17.93 R_{🜨} or 114387 km) and are giant planets have been included for the sake of comparison.
For candidate exoplanets, either those with uncertain radii that could be below or above the adopted cut-off of 1.6 R_{J} or those unconfirmed, disputed or missing either mass or yet a radius determination, see the list of exoplanets with uncertain radii and list of unconfirmed exoplanets, respectively.
For a chronological sequence of the largest exoplanets discovered see the chronological list of largest exoplanets.
Note: Due to Jupiter being an oblate spheroid, this article uses equatorial Jupiter radius (71 492 km) for the constant measure defined by the International Astronomical Union.

Key (Classification)
*	Probably brown dwarfs (≳ 13 M_{J}) (based on mass)
†	Probably sub-brown dwarfs (≲ 13 M_{J}) (based on mass and location)
?	System status uncertain (inconsistency in age or mass of planetary system)
!	Uncertain system age/mass status, while probably brown dwarfs (≳ 13 M_{J})
¿	Planetary status uncertain (inconsistency in age or mass of planet)
¡	Uncertain planetary age/mass status, while probably brown dwarfs (≳ 13 M_{J})
←	Confirmed exoplanets (≲ 13 M_{J}) (based on mass)
→	Planets with grazing transit, hindering radius determination
#	Notable non-exoplanets reported for reference
–	Theoretical planet size restrictions

Key (Illustration)
Artist's impression
Artist's size comparison
Artist's impression size comparison
Direct imaging telescopic observation
Direct image size comparison
Composite image of direct observations
Transiting telescopic observation
Rendered image
Diagram image/impression

Illustration	Name (Alternates)	Radius (R_{J})	Key	Mass (M_{J})	Notes
	Sun (Sol)	9.731 (1 R_{☉}) (695 700 km) (Note: The measured radius from 2003 to 2006 was 696,342 ± 65 km, calculated by timing transits of Mercury across the surface. while some in 2018 measured 695,660 ± 140 km which is consistent with helioseismic estimates. To avoid confusion, International Astronomical Union set the solar radius to exactly 695700 km.)	#	1047.569 (1 M_{☉}) (1.988 416 × 10^{30} kg) (Note: The best estimate mass is (1.988 475 ± 0.000 092) × 10^{30} kg. Another estimate mass gave 1.988 420 × 10^{30} kg (based on the ratio of the mass of Earth to the Sun of 1/332946). To simplify the solar mass, International Astronomical Union set it to exactly 1.988 416 × 10^{30} kg.)	The only star in the Solar System. Responsible for life on Earth and keeping the planets on orbit. The Sun is the brightest object in the Earth's sky, with an apparent magnitude of −26.74, so bright that looking at it directly will harm the eyes. Age: 4.6 Gyr. Reported for reference.
	Toliman (Alpha Centauri B)	8.360 ± 0.035 (0.8591 ± 0.0036 R_{☉})	#	952.450 ± 2.619 (0.9092 ± 0.0025 M_{☉})	One of first two stars (other being Rigil Kentaurus / Alpha Centauri A) to have its stellar parallax measured. Nearest (inner) binary star system and nearest star system, and nearest orange dwarf star to the Sun at the distance of 4.344 ± 0.002 ly (1.33188 ± 0.00061 pc). Alpha Centauri AB is the third binary star to be discovered, preceded by Mizar AB and Acrux. A member of Alpha Centauri System, the nearest system to the Sun. Age: 5.3 ± 0.3 Gyr. Reported for reference.
	Maximum size of planetary-mass object	8	–	~5	Maximum theoretical size limit assumed for a ~5 M_{J} mass object right after formation, however, for 'arbitrary initial conditions'.
	Proplyd 133-353 (COUP 540, COUP J0535-0523)	≲ 7.824 ± 0.807 (Note: Applying the Stefan–Boltzmann law with a nominal solar effective temperature of 5,772 K: $$\sqrt{\biggl(\frac{5,772}{2,450}\biggr)^4 \cdot 0.021} = 0.804\ R_\odot$$.) (Note: A calculated radius does not need to be the radius of the (dense) core.) (Note: Using PMS evolutionary models and a potential higher age of 1 Myr, the luminosity would be lower, and the planet would be smaller. However, this would require for the object to be closer as well, which is unlikely. Another distance estimate to the Orion Nebula Cluster would result in a luminosity 1.14 times lower and also a smaller radius.) (≲ 0.804 ± 0.083 R_{☉})	†	(≲) 13; 2 – 28 (Note: Instead of a photo-evaporating disk it may be an evaporating gaseous globule (EGG). If so, the final mass would be 2 – 28 M_{J}.)	A candidate sub-brown dwarf or rogue planet with a photoevaporating disk, located in the Orion Nebula Cluster. At a probable age younger than 500 000 years, it is one of the youngest free-floating planetary-mass candidates known. Proplyd 133-353 is proposed to have formed in a very low-mass dusty cloud or an evaporating gas globule as a second generation of star formation, which can explain both its young age and the presence of its disk.
	V2376 Orionis b (V2376 Ori b)	7.78 ± 0.97	*	≃ 20 (10 – 30)	Likely a brown dwarf.
	2M0535-05 A (V2384 Orionis A)	6.714 ± 0.107 (0.690 ± 0.011 R_{☉})	#	59.9 ± 3.5 (0.0572 ± 0.0033 M_{☉})	First eclipsing binary brown dwarf system to be discovered, orbiting around 9.8 days. Age: ~1 Myr; Reported for reference.
	2M0535-05 B (V2384 Orionis B)	5.255 ± 0.088 (0.540 ± 0.009 R_{☉})	#	38.3 ± 2.3 (0.0366 ± 0.0022 M_{☉})	First eclipsing binary brown dwarf system to be discovered, orbiting around 9.8 days. Age: ~1 Myr; Reported for reference.
	ROXs 12 b (2MASS J1626–2526 b, WDS J16265-2527 Ab)	4.85 ± 0.14	*	16 ± 4, 19 ± 5	In 2005, ROXs 12 b was discovered/detected on a wide separation by direct imaging, the same year DH Tauri b, GQ Lupi b, 2M1207b, and AB Pictoris b were confirmed, and was confirmed in 2013. ROXs 12 b and 2MASS J1626–2527 (WDS J16265-2527 B) inclination misalignment with ROXs 12 (WDS J16265-2527 A) was interpreted as either formation similar to fragmenting binary stars or ROXs 12 b formed in an equatorial disk that was torqued by 2MASS J1626–2527.
	HIP 79098 b (HIP 79098 (AB)b)	4.75 ± 0.09	*	28 ± 13, 16 – 25	The mass ratio between HIP 79098 b and the central binary HIP 79098 AB is estimated at 0.3–1% which is lower than 4%, suggesting that HIP 79098 b represents the upper end of the planet population, as opposed to having been formed as a star.
	2MASS J044144 (2M 0441+2301 Ba)	4.34 (Note: Based on the estimated temperature and luminosity via the Stefan-Boltzmann law.)	*	19 ± 3	Likely a brown dwarf. This brown dwarf along with its companion orbits around 2MASS J044145 AB (2M 0441+2301 Aab). Part of the lowest mass quadruple 2M 0441+23 system of 0.26 M_{☉}.
	Cha J1110-7633	3.8	†	5 – 10	Rogue planet
	GQ Lupi b (GQ Lupi Ab, GQ Lupi B)	3.7 ± 0.7	¡	~ 10 – 40; 33 ± 10, (Note: Assuming the planet/brown dwarf age is 2.5 ^{+1.5}_{−0.9} Myr); 26.4 ^{+2.9}_{−3.8}; (Note: Assuming the planet/brown dwarf age is 3.5 ± 1.5 Myr); 30.1 ^{+1.1}_{−1.2}	First confirmed exoplanet candidate to be directly imaged. It is believed to be several times more massive than Jupiter. Because the theoretical models which are used to predict planetary masses for objects in young star systems like GQ Lupi b are still tentative, the mass cannot be precisely determined, giving the masses of 1 – 39 M_{J}; in the higher half of this range, it may be classified as a young brown dwarf. Based on homogeneous ^{12}C/^{13}C ratio of 51 ^{+10}_{−8} of GQ Lupi A to 53 ^{+7}_{−6} of GQ Lupi b in the GQ Lup system and the low carbon-to-oxygen (C/O) ratio of GQ Lup b (0.50 ± 0.01) in recent study, GQ Lup b formed through gravitational collapse or disc instability. However, interpreting the C/O ratio in the context of planet formation is challenging due to the complex interplay between cloud condensation and atmospheric abundances. Other sources of the radius include 3.6±0.1 R_{J}, 3.0 ± 0.5 R_{J}, 3.77 R_{J}, 3.5 ^{+1.50}_{−1.03} R_{J}, 4.6 ± 1.4 R_{J}, 6.5 ± 2.0 R_{J}.
	ROXs 42 Bb	3.51 ± 0.70	?	13 ± 5	ROXs 42 Bb is more likely formed by disk (gravitational) instability based on its stellar C/O ratio. Older estimates include 2.10 ± 0.35 R_{J}, 1.9 – 2.4, 1.3 – 4.7 R_{J} and 2.43±0.18, 2.55±0.2 R_{J}. Other sources of masses include 3.2 – 27 M_{J}, 9 ^{+6}_{−3} M_{J}, 10 ± 4 M_{J}.
	HD 100546 b (KR Muscae b)	3.4	¡	1.65 – 25	Occasionally the initially reported 6.9 ^{+2.7}_{−2.9} R_{J} for the emitting area due to the diffuse dust and gas envelope or debris disk surrounding the planet is confused with the actual radius. Because of superimposed of the flux from HD 100546 b and its circumplanetary disk, various estimates for the mass of HD 100546 b have varied between 1.65 – 25 M_{J} with former based on the relation between the planet, circumplanetary disk (1.44 M_{🜨}), and circumstellar disk (50 M_{J}) masses derived from numerical simulation. While gas-starved models are also still compatible, this would suggest that HD 100546 b is inconsistent with several planet accretion models. HD 100546 system is the closest planetary system that contains a Herbig Ae/Be star at the distance of 353 ± 1 ly.
	2MASS J0437+2331 (UGCS J0437+2331)	3.30	†	7.1 ^{+1.1}_{−1.0}	May be a sub-brown dwarf or a rogue planet
	EV Lacertae	3.221 ± 0.127 (0.331 ± 0.013 R_{☉})	#	335.2 ± 8.38 (0.32 ± 0.008 M_{☉})	Responsible for the most powerful stellar flare so far observed. Its fast rotation, with its convective interior, produces a powerful magnetic field that is believed to play a role in the star's ability to produce such flares. Reported for reference.
	OTS 44	3.2 – 3.6	†	11.5 ± 5.5	First discovered rogue planet, and the coolest and faintest object in Chamaeleon I as well as the least massive known member of the cluster at the time of confirmation; very likely a brown dwarf or sub-brown dwarf with a circumstellar disk of dust and particles of rock and ice. The currently preferred radius estimate is done by SED modelling including substellar object and disk model.
	FU Tauri b (FU Tau b)	3.2 ± 0.3	*	~ 15.7, 20 ± 4, 19 ± 4	Likely a part of a binary brown dwarfs or sub-brown dwarfs.
	Cha J1110-7721	3.1	†	5 – 10	Rogue planet
	2MASS J044144b (2M 0441+2301 Bb)	3.06	†	9.8 ± 1.8	Based on the mass ratio to 2M J044145 A (2M 0441+2301 Aa) it is likely not a planet according to the IAU's exoplanet working definition, though still considered as a planet by the NASA Exoplanet Archive and Extrasolar Planets Encyclopaedia. Furthermore, 2MASS J044144b is very big compared to its host and may have formed within 1 million years or so which is too big and too fast to form like a regular planet from a disk around the central object. This planet/sub-brown dwarf along with its host orbits around 2MASS J044145 AB (2M 0441+2301 Aab). Part of the lowest mass quadruple 2M 0441+23 system of 0.26 M_{☉}.
	YSES-1 b (TYC 8998-760-1 b)	2.97 ^{+0.09}_{−0.08}; 1.821 ± 0.08,	*	21.8 ± 3	Likely a brown dwarf. First substellar object to have an isotope variant of stable element (^{13}C) detected in its atmosphere. First directly imaged planetary system having multiple bodies orbiting a Sun-like star.
	UGCS J0422+2655	2.9	†	5 – 10	Rogue planet
	UGCS J0433+2251	2.9	†	5 – 10	Rogue planet
	C69-Sub-001	2.84	†	12.6	May be a sub-brown dwarf or a rogue planet
	Kapteyn's Star	2.83 ± 0.24 (0.291 ± 0.025 R_{☉})	#	294.4 ± 14.7 (0.2810 ± 0.014 M_{☉})	The closest halo star and nearest red subdwarf, at the distance of 12.82 ly (3.93 pc), and second-highest proper motion of any stars of more than 8 arcseconds per year (after Barnard's Star). Age: 11.5 ^{+0.5}_{−1.5} Gyr. Reported for reference.
	Cha 1107−7626 (Cha J11070768−7626326)	2.8	†	6 – 10	Rogue planet; Lowest-mass object with hydrocarbons detected in its disk. Cha 1107-7626 has also the highest accretion rate measured in a planetary-mass object, reaching up to 10^{−7} M_{J} per year.
	AB Aurigae b (AB Aur b)	< 2.75 (Note: The radius estimate might have been affected by the planet's circumplanetary disk, as the spectrum not necessarily corresponds to a planet photosphere.)	!	20 (~ 4 Myr), 10 – 12 (1 Myr), 9, < 130	More likely a (proto-)brown dwarf. Assuming a hot-start evolution model and a planetary mass, AB Aurigae b would be younger than 2 Myr to have its observed large luminosity, which is inconsistent with the age of AB Aurigae of 6.0 ^{+2.5}_{−1.0} Myr, which could be caused by delayed planet formation in the disk. Other system ages include 1 - 5 Myr, 4 ± 1 Myr and 4 Myr. Another source gives a higher mass of 20 M_{J} in the brown dwarf regime for an age of 4 Myr, arguing since gravitational instability of the disk (preferred formation mechanism in the discovery publication) operates on very short time scales, the object might be as old as AB Aur. A more recent study also support the latter source, given the apparent magnitude was revised upwards.
	KPNO-Tau 1	2.7	*	25.0 ± 5.0	Brown dwarf
	DH Tauri b (DH Tau b)	2.51 ± 0.16	←	8.4 ± 1.1; 11.3 ± 2.2	First planet to have a confirmed circumplanetary disk, detected with polarimetry at the VLT and youngest confirmed planet at an age of 0.7 Myr (700000 years). DH Tauri b is suspected to have an exomoon candidate orbiting it every 320 years, with about the same mass as Jupiter. Other sources give the radii: 2.7 ± 0.8 R_{J}, 2.49 R_{J}, 2.6 ± 0.6 R_{J} and masses: 11 ± 3 M_{J}, 14.2 ^{+2.4}_{−3.5} M_{J}, 17 ± 6 M_{J}, 12 ± 4 M_{J}.
	UGCS J0439+2642	2.5	†	5 – 10	Rogue planet
	CM Draconis A (Gliese 630.1 Aa)	2.44379 ± 0.00156 (0.25113 ± 0.00016 R_{☉})	#	235.8 ± 0.3 (0.22507 ± 0.00024 M_{☉})	Second eclipsing binary red dwarf system discovered after YY Geminorum (Castor C ab). One of the lightest stars with precisely measured masses and radii, orbiting around 1.268 days. The members of Gliese 630.1 triple system. Age: 4.1 ± 0.8 Gyr. The binary stars are suspected to have planet based on variations in the timing of the system's eclipses. Reported for reference.
	PZ Telescopii b (PZ Tel b, HD 174429 b)	2.42 ^{+0.28}_{−0.34}	*	27 ^{+25}_{−9}	Likely a brown dwarf. If PZ Tel b is a planet, it would be first large Jupiter-like planet to be directly imaged.
	TWA 5 B (TWA 5 A (AB) b)	2.34 – 3.02	*	25 ^{+120}_{−20}	First brown dwarf companion around a pre-main sequence star confirmed by both spectrum and proper motion. Exhibits strong Hα emission.
	CT Chamaeleontis b (CT Cha b)	2.31 ± 0.69	*	9.7 ^{+1.2}_{−1.1}; 17 ± 6	Likely a brown dwarf or a planetary mass companion. The NASA Exoplanet Archive considers it as an exoplanet, the most distant to be directly imaged at the distance of 622 ly (190.71 pc). Other sources of the radius include 2.6 ^{+1.2}_{−0.2} R_{J}.
	CM Draconis B (Gliese 630.1 Ab)	2.30940 ± 0.00136 (0.23732 ± 0.00014 R_{☉})	#	220.2 ± 0.3 (0.21017 ± 0.00028 M_{☉})	Second eclipsing binary red dwarf system discovered after YY Geminorum (Castor C ab). One of the lightest stars with precisely measured masses and radii, orbiting around 1.268 days. The members of Gliese 630.1 triple system. Age: 4.1 ± 0.8 Gyr. The binary stars are suspected to have planet based on variations in the timing of the system's eclipses. Reported for reference.
	RUBIES-EGS-41280 (AEGIS 19337)	< 2.30	†	< 8.4	May be a sub-brown dwarf or a rogue planet
	Eta Telescopii B (η Tel B, HR 7329 B)	2.28 ± 0.03	*	29 ^{+16}_{−13}; 54.2+6.3 −7.3	Part of a triple star system.
	TWA 29	2.222 ^{+0.082}_{−0.081}	†	6.6 ^{+5.2}_{−2.9}	Rogue planet
	KPNO-Tau 12 (2MASS J0419012+280248)	2.22 ^{+0.11}_{−0.17}	†	11.5	A low-mass brown dwarf or free-floating planetary-mass object surrounded by a protoplanetary disk. A member of Taurus-Auriga star-forming region. May be gravitationally bound to IRAS 04158+2805 or the M-type binary LkCa 7. Other sources of radius include: 1.84 R_{J}, and masses: 14.6 M_{J}, 13.6 M_{J}, 6 – 7 M_{J}, 16.5 M_{J}, 17.8 ^{+6.7}_{−4.6} M_{J}, 12.7 ^{+1.6}_{−1.8} M_{J}
	TOI-6894	2.215 ± 0.055 (0.2276 ± 0.0057 R_{☉})	#	216.85 ± 11.52 (0.207 ± 0.011 M_{☉})	Least massive star known to host a transiting gas planet. Reported for reference.
	HIP 78530 b (HIP 78530 B)	2.21 ± 0.60	*	28 ± 10; 19.1 ^{+1.4}_{−0.6}	Most likely a brown dwarf. Because HIP 78530 b's characteristics blend the line between whether or not it is a brown dwarf or a planet, astronomers have tried to determine what HIP 78530 b is by predicting whether it was created in a planet-like or star-like manner.
	UHW J247.95-24.78	2.2	†	5 – 10	Rogue planet
	Hot Jupiter limit	2.2	–	≳ 0.4	Theoretical size limit for hot Jupiters close to a star, that are limited by tidal heating, resulting in 'runaway inflation'
	HAT-P-67 Ab	2.140 ± 0.025	←	0.45 ± 0.15	A very puffy hot Jupiter which is among planets with lowest densities of ~0.061 g/cm^{3}. Largest known planet with a precisely measured radius, as of 2025.
	PSO J077.1+24	2.14	†	5.9 ^{+0.9}_{−0.8}	Rogue planet
	CAHA Tau 1	2.12	†	10 ± 5	Rogue planet
	HAT-P-41 Ab	2.05 ± 0.50	←	1.19 ± 0.60	
	HATS-15 b	2.019 ^{+0.202}_{−0.160}	←	2.17 ± 0.15	
	Proto-Jupiter	2.0 – 2.59	#	0.994; ≲ 1; 1	Jupiter is most likely formed first and underwent planetary migration, impacting the whole Solar System. During the migration, Jupiter was briefly as close as 1.5 AU to the Sun, likely influencing the formation of Mars, before migrating back to near the ice line by Saturn's gravity. The gas disk dispersal triggers instablity of outer Solar System, causing in ejecting fifth giant (or hypothetical Planet Nine if confirmed) (Note: Hypothetical Planet Nine may be challenged by the discovery of 2017 OF_{201} and Ammonite (2023 KQ_{14}) which their orbits are anti-aligned to the calculated orbit of Planet Nine. Their existence, which also means that there are likely many other similar objects that are just obscured from earth observation, challenges one of the leading arguments for Planet Nine, that its gravity causes trans-Neptunian objects to cluster into a distinct region. Nevertheless, it is possible that Planet Nine's existence is still there as the simulations do not disprove Planet Nine.) and eventually moving Jupiter's orbit to current position. Due to its radiation emitting more heat than incoming through solar radiation via the Kelvin–Helmholtz mechanism within its contracting interior, Jupiter is currently shrinking by about 1 mm (0.039 in) per year. Through this, at the time of its formation, Jupiter was hotter and was about twice its current diameter with smaller mass or the same as the current mass. Reported for reference.
	Cha 110913-773444 (Cha 110913)	2.0 – 2.1	†	8 ^{+7}_{−3}	A rogue planet/sub-brown dwarf that is surrounded by a protoplanetary disk, the first one to be confirmed. It is one of youngest free-floating substellar objects with 0.5–10 Myr. The currently preferred radius estimate is done by SED modelling including substellar object and disk model.
	CFHTWIR-Oph 90 (Oph 90)	2.00 ^{+0.09}_{−0.12}; 3	†	10.5	May be rogue planet or brown dwarf
	SSTB213 J041757 A (J041757 A)	2	†	3.5	In a binary with a smaller 1.7 R_{J} proto-rogue planet/brown dwarf. It is not clear how proto-brown dwarfs J041757 AB are formed; the observations of the outflow momentum rate of these two proto-BD candidates suggest they formed as a scaled-down version of low-mass stars.
	Kepler-435 b (KOI-680 b)	1.99 ± 0.18	←	0.84 ± 0.15	
	PDS 70 c	1.98 ^{+0.39}_{−0.31}	←	7.8 ^{+5.0}_{−4.7}; 9+9 −6	Second multiplanetary system to be directly imaged (after HR 8799 System) and first system to host multiple directly imaged young giant planets in formation. PDS 70 c is the first confirmed directly imaged exoplanet still embedded in the natal gas and dust from which planets form (protoplanetary disk), and the second protoplanet to have a confirmed circumplanetary disk (after DH Tauri b).
	WASP-12Ab	1.965 ^{+0.088}_{−0.087}	←	1.476 ^{+0.076}_{−0.069}	This planet is so close to WASP-12 A that its tidal forces are distorting it into an egg-like shape. First planet observed clearly being consumed by its host star; it will be destroyed in 3.16 ± 0.10 Ma due to tidal interactions. WASP-12b is suspected to have one exomoon due to a curve of change of shine of the planet observed regular variation of light.
	PDS 70 b	1.96 ^{+0.20}_{−0.17}, 2.7	←	7.9 ^{+4.9}_{−4.7}; 6+6 −4	Second multiplanetary system to be directly imaged (after HR 8799 System) and first system to host multiple directly imaged young giant planets in formation. PDS 70 b is the first protoplanet to have ever been confirmed with certainty.
	TOI-5811 Bb	1.96 ± 0.18	←	0.81 ^{+0.11}_{−0.10}	
	OGLE2-TR-L9b (2MASS J1107 b)	1.958 ^{+0.174}_{−0.111}	←	4.5 ± 1.5	First discovered planet orbiting a fast-rotating hot star.
	CFHTWIR-Oph 98 (Oph 98)	1.95 ^{+0.11}_{−0.10}; 2.14	*	15.4 ± 0.8; 10.5	Either a M-type brown dwarf or sub-brown dwarf with a sub-brown dwarf/planet companion CFHTWIR-Oph 98 b. Other sources of masses includes: 9.6 – 18.4 M_{J}.
	WASP-178b (KELT-26 b, HD 134004 b)	1.940 ^{+0.060}_{−0.058}	←	1.41 ^{+0.43}_{−0.51}	An ultra-hot Jupiter. Initially, the planet's atmosphere was discovered having silicon monoxide, making this exoplanet the first one to have the compound on its atmosphere, now the atmosphere is more likely dominated by ionized magnesium and iron. First hot Jupiter to be discovered orbiting a chemically peculiar star.
	Ross 128	1.927 ± 0.068 (0.198 ± 0.007 R_{☉})	#	184.4 ± 4.2 (0.176 ± 0.004 M_{☉})	This star will not only be the closest to the Sun in a bit less than 80000 years, it also has a confirmed Earth-sized exoplanet, that is only 35% more massive than Earth and receives only 38% more starlight near the inner edge of the habitable zone. Ross 128 b might become the closest exoplanet to the Sun in the future, if no additional other exoplanets are confirmed closer. Reported for reference.
	BD-14 3065b (TOI-4987 b)	1.926 ± 0.094	*	12.37 ± 0.92	Might be a brown dwarf fusing deuterium at its core, which could explain its anomalous high radius. Also the fourth hottest known exoplanet, measuring 3,520 K (3,250 °C; 5,880 °F).
	Kepler-13 Ab	1.91 ± 0.25 – 2.57 ± 0.26	←	9.28±0.16	Discovered by Kepler in first four months of Kepler data. A more recent analysis argues that a third-light correction factor of 1.818 is needed, to correct for the light blending of Kepler-13 B, resulting in higher radii results.
	TOI-1518 b	1.875 ± 0.053	←	1.83 ± 0.47	
	HAT-P-70b	1.87 ^{+0.15}_{−0.10}	←	< 6.78 (3 σ)	Has a retrograde orbit.
	2MASS J1935-2846	1.869 ± 0.053	†	7.4 ^{+6.3}_{−3.4}	May be a sub-brown dwarf or rogue planet.
	HATS-23b	1.86 ^{+0.30}_{−0.40}	→	1.470 ± 0.072	Grazing planet.
	CFHTWIR-Oph 98 b (Oph 98 b, CFHTWIR-Oph 98 B)	1.86 ± 0.05	†	7.8 ^{+0.7}_{−0.8}	Its formation as an exoplanet is challenging or impossible. If its formation scenario is known, it may explain the formation of Planet Nine. Planetary migration may explain its formation, or it may be a sub-brown dwarf. Other sources of mass includes 4.1 – 11.6 M_{J}.
	KELT-8b (HD 343246 b)	1.86 ^{+0.18}_{−0.16}	←	0.867 ^{+0.065}_{−0.061}	
	WASP-76b	1.842 ± 0.024	←	0.921 ± 0.032	A glory effect in the atmosphere of WASP-76b might be responsible for the observed increase in brightness of its eastern terminator zone which if confirmed, it would become the first glory-like phenomenon to be discovered on an exoplanet. WASP-76b is suspected to have an exomoon analogue to Jupiter's Io due to the detection of sodium via absorption spectroscopy.
	TrES-4 (Note: While other sources usually use the "b" suffix for planets discovered by Trans-Atlantic Exoplanet Survey (TrES), the TrES and the SIMBAD do not use the "b" suffix typically used in extrasolar planet designations.) (GSC 06200-00648 Ab)	1.838 ^{+0.240}_{−0.238}	←	0.78 ± 0.19	Largest confirmed exoplanet ever found at the time of discovery. This planet has a density of 0.17 g/cm^{3}, comparable to that of balsa wood, less than Saturn's 0.7 g/cm^{3}.
	Mu^{2} Scorpii b (μ^{2} Scorpii b)	1.83	*	14.4±0.8	Mu^{2} Scorpii b (along with the unconfirmed 'c') are the first planet candidates to be detected around a supernova progenitor-star. It receives an insolation from its host star similar to that of Jupiter. The mass ratio to Pipirima (Mu^{2} Scorpii) of 0.0015 (Note: 14.4/(1047.6*9.1) ≈ 0.0015) qualifies this object as planet even though its mass is above the deuterium-burning limit.
	HAT-P-33b	1.827 ± 0.29; (Note: Assuming elliptical orbit (most likely)); 1.85 ± 0.49, 1.686 ± 0.045 (Note: Assuming circular orbit)	←	0.72 ^{+0.13}_{−0.12}	Due to high level of jitter, it is difficult to constrain both planets' eccentricities with accuracy. Most of their defined characteristics are based on the assumption that HAT-P-32b and HAT-P-33b have their elliptical orbits, although their discoverers have also derived the planets' characteristics on the assumption that they have their circular orbits. The elliptical model has been chosen because it is considered to be the more likely scenario.
	HAT-P-32b (HAT-P-32 Ab)	1.822 ^{+0.350}_{−0.236}, 2.04 ± 0.10; 1.789 ± 0.025	←	0.941 ± 0.166, 0.860 ± 0.164	Due to high level of jitter, it is difficult to constrain both planets' eccentricities with accuracy. Most of their defined characteristics are based on the assumption that HAT-P-32b and HAT-P-33b have their elliptical orbits, although their discoverers have also derived the planets' characteristics on the assumption that they have their circular orbits. The elliptical model has been chosen because it is considered to be the more likely scenario.
	KELT-20b (MASCARA-2b)	1.821 ± 0.045	←	3.355 ^{+0.062}_{−0.063}	Ultra-hot Jupiter
	Barnard's Star (Proxima Ophiuchi)	1.8197 ± 0.0097 (0.187 ± 0.001 R_{☉})	#	168.7 ^{+3.8}_{−3.7} (0.1610 ^{+0.0036}_{−0.0035} M_{☉})	Second nearest planetary system to the Sun at the distance of 5.97 ly (1.83 pc) and closest star in the northern celestial hemisphere. Also the highest proper motion of any stars of 10.3 arcseconds per year relative to the Sun. Has 4 confirmed planet, Barnard b (Barnard's Star b), c, d and e, making this star the closest solitary one with confirmed multi-planetary system. Reported for reference.
	CoRoT-1b	1.805 ^{+0.132}_{−0.131}	←	1.03 ± 0.12	First exoplanet for which optical (as opposed to infrared) observations of phases were reported.
	WTS-2b	1.804 ^{+0.144}_{−0.158}	←	1.12 ± 0.16	
	UGCS J0417+2832	1.8	†	5 – 10	Rogue planet
	Saffar (υ And Ab)	~1.8	←	1.70 ^{+0.33}_{−0.24}	Radius estimated using the phase curve of reflected light. The planet orbits very close to Titawin (υ And A) at the distance of 0.0595 AU, completing an orbit in 4.617 days. First multiple-planet system to be discovered around a main-sequence star, and first multiple-planet system known in a multiple-star system.
	HAT-P-40b	1.799 ^{+0.237}_{−0.260}	←	0.48 ± 0.13	A very puffy hot Jupiter
	WASP-122b (KELT-14b)	1.795 ^{+0.107}_{−0.079}	←	1.284 ± 0.032	
	KELT-12b	1.79 ^{+0.18}_{−0.17}	←	0.95 ± 0.14	
	KELT-9b (HD 195689 b)	1.783±0.009	←	2.17 ± 0.56	Hottest confirmed exoplanet, with a temperature of 4050±180 K (3777 ± 180 °C; 6830 ± 324 °F). First exoplanet with detection of the rare-earth element terbium in atmosphere.
	Tylos (WASP-121b)	1.773 ^{+0.041}_{−0.033}	←	1.157 ± 0.07	First exoplanet found to contain water on its stratosphere and first to have 3D structure of its atmosphere revealed. The abundance of volatile elements such as carbon and oxygen and refractory elements like iron and nickel reveals that Tylos likely have formed faraway from its host star, in an ice-rich environment, before migrating inward. Tylos is suspected to have an exomoon analogous to Jupiter's Io due to the detection of sodium absorption spectroscopy around it. First exoplanet to have a comprehensive record for the outflow of atmospheric helium.
	TOI-640 Ab	1.771 ^{+0.060}_{−0.056}	←	0.88 ± 0.16	This planet orbits its host star nearly over poles, misalignment between the orbital plane and equatorial plane of the star been equal to 104 ± 2°.
	WASP-187b	1.766 ± 0.036	←	0.801 ^{+0.084}_{−0.083}	
	WASP-94 Ab (TOI-107 b)	1.761 ^{+0.194}_{−0.191}	←	0.5±0.13	First exoplanet detected to have repeating cloud cycles. This is caused by the powerful winds that might lift clouds high into the sky on the cooler side of the planet and then plunge downward on the hotter dayside, dragging the clouds deep into the planet’s interior and effectively burying them out of sight before sunset. Alternatively, the phenomenon may be akin to morning fog burning off on Earth but on an extreme scale. Clouds would form in the darkness of the planet’s nightside. As they drift into the scorching heat of over 1,000 °C on the day side, the chemicals that make up the clouds boil away, and the clouds vaporize.
	TOI-2669b	1.76 ± 0.16	←	0.61 ± 0.19	
	Pollera (WASP-79b)	1.756 ± 0.031	←	0.835 ± 0.077	This planet is orbiting the host star at nearly-polar orbit with respect to star's equatorial plane, inclination being equal to −95.2 ^{+0.9}_{−1.0}°. Previous radii include: 2.09 ± 0.14 R_{J} 1.704 ^{+0.195}_{−0.180} R_{J}, and 1.5795 ± 0.0048 R_{J}. Older masses include: 0.850 ^{+0.180}_{−0.180} M_{J}.
	TOI-2578 b	1.754 ^{+0.058}_{−0.057}	←	0.526 ^{+0.071}_{−0.068}	
	WISE J0528+0901	1.752 ^{+0.292}_{−0.195}	†	13 ^{+3}_{−6}	Brown dwarf or rogue planet
	HATS-26b	1.75 ± 0.21	←	0.650 ± 0.076	
	Kepler-12b	1.7454 ^{+0.076}_{−0.072}	←	0.431 ± 0.041	Least-irradiated of four hot Jupiters at the time of discovery
	2MASS J2352-1100	1.742 ^{+0.035}_{−0.036}	†	12.4 ^{+9.4}_{−5.5}	Brown dwarf or rogue planet
	KELT-15b	1.74 ± 0.20	←	1.31 ± 0.43	
	HAT-P-57b	1.74 ± 0.36	←	1.41 ± 1.52	
	WASP-93b	1.737 ^{+0.121}_{−0.170}	←	1.47 ± 0.29	
	WASP-82b	1.726 ^{+0.163}_{−0.195}	←	1.17 ± 0.20	
	Ditsö̀ (WASP-17b)	1.720 ^{+0.004}_{−0.005}, 1.83 ± 0.01	←	0.512 ± 0.037	First planet discovered to have a retrograde orbit and first to have quartz (crystalline silica, SiO_{2}) in its clouds. Has an exteremely low density of 0.08 g/cm^{3}, the lowest of any exoplanet when it was discovered, and was possibly the largest exoplanet at the time of discovery, with a radius of 1.92 R_{J}.
	KELT-19 Ab	1.717 ^{+0.094}_{−0.093}	←	3.98^{+0.32}_{−0.33}	First exoplanet found to have its orbit flipped (obliquity of 155 ^{+17}_{−21}°) due to constraints on stellar rotational velocity, sky-projected obliquity and limb-darkening coefficients (see Kozai–Lidov mechanism).
	HAT-P-39b	1.712+0.140 −0.115	←	0.60±0.10	
	KELT-4Ab	1.706 ^{+0.085}_{−0.076}	←	0.878 ^{+0.070}_{−0.067}	Fourth planet found in triple star system. KELT-4A is the brightest host (V~10) of a hot Jupiter in a hierarchical triple stellar system found.
	HAT-P-64b	1.703 ± 0.070	←	0.58 ^{+0.18}_{−0.13}	
	Kepler-42 (KOI-961)	1.703 ± 0.058 (0.175 ± 0.006 R_{☉})	#	150.8 ^{+7.3}_{−6.3} (0.144 ^{+0.007}_{−0.006} M_{☉})	Kepler-42 has three known exoplanets, all of which are smaller than Earth in radius and orbit very close to the star. These exoplanets are the first terrestrial planets that were found to orbit a red dwarf star. Reported for reference.
	Qatar-7b	1.70 ± 0.03	←	1.88 ± 0.25	
	SSTB213 J041757 B (J041757 B)	1.70	†	1.50	In a binary with a larger 2 R_{J} proto-rogue planet/brown dwarf. It is not clear how proto-brown dwarfs J041757 AB are formed; the observations of the outflow momentum rate of these two proto-BD candidates suggest they formed as a scaled-down version of low-mass stars.
	CoRoT-17b	1.694 ^{+0.139}_{−0.193}	←	2.430±0.300	Hot Jupiter
	TOI-615b	1.69 ^{+0.06}_{−0.05}	←	0.43^{+0.09}_{−0.08}	
	CoRoT-35b	1.68 ± 0.11	←	1.10 ± 0.37	
|	2MJ0219 b (2MASS J0219-39 b, 2MASS J02192210-3925225 b)	1.67 ± 0.35	*	13.9 ± 1.1	
	KELT-7b	1.664 ^{+0.076}_{−0.088}	←	1.39 ± 0.22	
	1RXS J1609 b (1RXS J160929.1−210524 b)	~ 1.664 – 1.7	!	14 ^{+2}_{−3}, 12.6 – 15.7, 12 ± 2	Thought to be the lightest known exoplanet at the time of announcement orbiting its host at a large separation of 330 AU and third announced directly imaged exoplanet orbiting a sun-like star (after GQ Lup b and AB Pic b). 1RXS 1609 b's location far from 1RXS 1609 presents serious challenges to current models of planetary formation: the timescale to form a planet by core accretion at this distance from the star would be longer than the age of the system itself. One possibility is that the planet may have formed closer to the star and migrated outwards as a result of interactions with the disk or with other planets in the system. An alternative is that the planet formed in situ via the disk instability mechanism, where the disk fragments because of gravitational instability, though this would require an unusually massive protoplanetary disk. With the upward revision in the age of the Upper Scorpius group from 5 million to 11 million years, the estimated mass of 1RXS J1609b is approximately 14 M_{J}, i.e. above the deuterium-burning limit. An older age for the J1609 system implies that the luminosity of J1609b is consistent with a much more massive object, making more likely that J1609b may be simply a brown dwarf which formed in a manner similar to that of other low-mass and substellar companions.
	TOI-2886 b	1.663 ± 0.041	←	1.4±0.23	
	TOI-1855 b	1.65 ^{+0.52}_{−0.37}	←	1.133 ± 0.096	
	TOI-3807 b	>1.65 (95% lower limit)	→	1.04 ^{+0.15}_{−0.14}	Grazing planet, a large radius of 2.00 R_{J} derived from transit data is unreliable due to its grazing nature.
	HAT-P-7b (Kepler-2b)	1.64 ± 0.11	←	1.84	Second planet discovered to have a retrograde orbit (after Ditsö̀) and first exoplanet to be detected by ellipsoidal light variations.
	NGTS-33 b	1.64 ± 0.07	←	3.6 ± 0.3	
	HAT-P-60b	1.631 ± 0.070	←	0.574 ± 0.038	
	AB Pictoris b (AB Pic b)	1.63 ± 0.48	←	9.4 ± 1.1; 12.9 ^{+1.0}_{−0.3}	Previously believed to be a likely brown dwarf, with mass estimates of 13–14 M_{J} to 70 M_{J}, its mass is now estimated to be 10±1 M_{J}, with an age of 13.3+1.1 −0.6 million years. Other sources of the radius include 1.51 ± 0.03 R_{J}, 1.57 ± 0.07 – 1.8 ± 0.3 R_{J}, 1.4 – 2.2 R_{J}.
	TOI-159 b	1.622 ± 0.015	←	3.49 ± 0.26	
	Kepler-7b	1.622 ±0.013	←	0.441 ^{+0.043}_{−0.042}	One of the first five exoplanets to be confirmed by the Kepler spacecraft, within 34 days of Kepler's science operations, and the first exoplanet to have a crude map of cloud coverage.
	KELT-8b	1.62 ± 0.10	←	0.83 ± 0.12	Water (H_{2}O) was detected at the planet atmosphere.
	CD-35 2722 B	1.62 ± 0.05	*	29.5 ^{+5.1}_{−4.3}	First unambiguous confirmed exosatellite or exomoon candidate detected though it is uncertain whether this exosatellite would fulfil the presently undefined criteria for qualifying as an exomoon given that CD-35 2722 B is likely to be brown dwarf based on its mass and the exosatellite is massive enough to be a planet.
	WASP-189 b	1.619 ± 0.021	←	1.99 ^{+0.16}_{−0.14}	Fifth hottest known exoplanet, at an temperature of 3,435 K (3,162 °C; 5,723 °F).
	HAT-P-65b	1.611 ± 0.024	←	0.554 ^{+0.092}_{−0.091}	This planet has been suffering orbital decay due to its close proximity to HAT-P-65; 0.04 AU.
	K2-52b	1.61 ± 0.20	←	0.40 ± 0.35	
	NGTS-31 b	1.61 ± 0.16	←	1.12 ± 0.12	
	HATS-11b (EPIC 216414930b)	1.609 ± 0.064	←	0.85	
	SR 12 c (SR 12 (AB) b, ROX 21 c)	1.60 – 2.38 ^{+0.27}_{−0.32}	!	16 ± 2	The companion is at the very edge of the deuterium burning limit. This object orbits around SR 12 AB at a separation of 980 AU but has a circumplanetary disk, detected in sub-mm with ALMA. The nature of the disk is unclear: Assuming the disk has only 1 mm grains, the dust mass of the disk is 0.012 M_{🜨} (0.95 M_{☾}). For a disk only made of 1 μm grains, it would have a dust mass of 0.054 M_{🜨} (4.4 M_{☾}). The disk also contains gas, as is indicated by the accretion of hydrogen, with the gas mass being on the order of 0.03 M_{J} (about 9.5 M_{🜨}). Other sources of masses includes 14 ^{+7}_{−8} M_{J}, 12 – 15 M_{J}, 13 ± 2 M_{J}, and 11 ± 3 M_{J}.
	WISPIT 2b (TYC 5709-354-1 b)	1.60 ± 0.20	←	5.3 ± 1.0	Second system (after PDS 70) to host multiple directly imaged young giant planets in formation and one of the first three planetary systems (with HD 169142 and HD 97048) to have its circumstellar disk extended with a multi-ringed substructure and is candidate to be the first unambiguously detected in a multi-ringed disk. First embedded planet providing a disk viscosity estimate. This protoplanet is detected in H-alpha, so it might be accreting material from a circumplanetary disk.
A few notable examples with radii below 1.6 R_{J} (17.93 R_{🜨})
	WASP-103b	1.528 ^{+0.073}_{−0.047}	←	1.455 ^{+0.090}_{−0.091}	First exoplanet to have a deformation detected (see Jacobi ellipsoid).
	2MASS J1115+1937	1.5 ± 0.1	†	6 ^{+8}_{−4}	Nearest rogue planet surrounded by planetary disk at the distance of 147 ± 7 ly (45.1 ± 2.1 pc).
	Proxima Centauri (Alpha Centauri C)	1.50 ± 0.04 (0.1542 ± 0.0045 R_{☉})	#	127.9 ± 2.3 (0.1221 ± 0.0022 M_{☉})	Nearest (flare) star and planetary system to the Sun, at a distance of 4.24 ly (1.30 pc), orbiting around Alpha Centauri AB System, the nearest star system to the Sun. Age: 4.85 Gyr. Has two confirmed planets, Proxima b (Proxima Centauri b) and Proxima d, and a disputed planet, Proxima c, making Proxima the nearest planetary system to host more than one planet, supplanting Barnard System, (Note: minus the disputed planet) and nearest multi-planetary system in multi-star system. Reported for reference.
	Banksia (WASP-19b)	1.410 ^{+0.017}_{−0.013}; 1.395 ^{+0.023}_{−0.011}; 1.386 ± 0.032	←	1.139 ^{+0.030}_{−0.020}; 1.114 ^{+0.036}_{−0.017}; 1.168 ± 0.023	First exoplanet to have its secondary eclipse and orbital phases observed from the ground-based observations and first to have titanium oxide (TiO) detected in an exoplanet atmosphere. At the time of discovery, WASP-19b was the shortest period transiting exoplanet discovered with the orbital period of 0.7888399 days.
	2M1207 b (TWA 27b)	1.399 ^{+0.008}_{−0.010}	†	5.5 ± 0.5	First planetary body in an orbit discovered via direct imaging, second confirmed exoplanet candidate to be directly imaged, and the first around a brown dwarf. It could be considered a sub-brown dwarf due to its large mass in relation to its host: 2M1207 b is around six times more massive than Jupiter, but orbits a 26 M_{J} brown dwarf, a ratio much larger than the 1:1000 of Jupiter and Sun for example. The IAU defined that exoplanets must have a mass ratio to the central object less than 0.04, which would make 2M1207 b a sub-brown dwarf. Nevertheless, 2M1207 b has been considered an exoplanet by press media and websites, exoplanet databases and alternative definitions. (Note: Some other definitions of the term planet require a planet to have formed in the same way as the planets in the Solar System did, by secondary accretion in a protoplanetary disk. With such a definition, if 2M1207 b formed by direct gravitational collapse of a gaseous nebula, it would be a sub-brown dwarf rather than a planet. A similar debate exists regarding the identity of GQ Lupi b, also first imaged in 2004. On the other hand, the discovery of marginal cases like Cha 110913 — a free-floating, planetary-mass object — raises the question of whether distinction by formation is a reliable dividing line between stars/brown dwarfs and planets. In 2006, the IAU's Working Group on Extrasolar Planets described 2M1207b as a "possible planetary-mass companion to a brown dwarf.")
	HD 209458 b ("Osiris")	1.359 ^{+0.016}_{−0.019}	←	0.682 ^{+0.014}_{−0.015}	Represents multiple milestones in exoplanetary discovery, such as the first exoplanet known observed to transit its host star, the first exoplanet with a precisely measured radius, one of first two exoplanets (other being HD 189733 Ab) to be observed spectroscopically and the first to have an atmosphere detected, containing evaporating hydrogen, and oxygen and carbon. First extrasolar gas giant to have its superstorm measured. Also first (indirect) detection of a magnetic field on an exoplanet. This planet is on process of stripping its atmosphere due to extreme "hydrodynamic drag" created by its evaporating hydrogen atmosphere. Nicknamed "Osiris".
	WASP-127b	1.311 ^{+0.025}_{−0.029}	←	0.1647 ^{+0.0214}_{−0.0172}	The planet's tidally locked rotation to the star causes the supersonic wind to blow up to 33,000 km/h (21,000 mph) on equator latitude, the fastest jetstream of the wind ever measured on a planet.
	Teide 1	1.3108 ^{+0.1197}_{−0.0749} (0.1347 ^{+0.0123}_{−0.0077} R_{☉})	#	52 ^{+15}_{−10} (0.0496 ^{+0.0143}_{−0.0095} M_{☉})	The first brown dwarf to be confirmed. It is located in the Pleiades and has an age of 70 – 140 Myr. Reported for reference.
	OGLE-TR-56b	1.30 ± 0.05	←	1.29 ± 0.12	First discovered exoplanet using the transit method.
	BD+60 1417b (W1243)	1.29 ± 0.06	*	13.47 ± 5.67	First directly imaged exoplanet candidate discovered by a citizen scientist. This planet orbits around BD+60 1417 at the distance of 1662 AU, making this host star the only main sequence star with about 1 M_{☉} that is orbited by a tentatively planetary-mass object at a separation larger than 1000 AU. Its status of exoplanet is unclear; according to the NASA Exoplanet Archive BD+60 1417b is an exoplanet and it falls within their definition: An object with a minimum mass lower than 30 M_{J} and a not free-floating object with sufficient follow-up. However, the official working definition by the International Astronomical Union allows only exoplanets with a maximum mass of 13 M_{J} and according to current knowledge BD+60 1417b could be more massive than this limit and might be a brown dwarf.
	TOI-157b	1.29 ± 0.02	←	1.18 ± 0.13	Oldest confirmed planet at an age of 12.82 ^{+0.73}_{−1.4} Gyr
	TrES-2 (Kepler-1 Ab)	1.265 ^{+0.054}_{−0.051}	←	1.199 ± 0.052	Darkest known exoplanet due to an extremely low geometric albedo of 0.0136, absorbing 99% of light.
	Beta Pictoris d (β Pic d)	1.26 ± 0.03	←	2.4 ± 0.6	Second planetary system to have the exoplanet's orbital motion confirmed (after HR 8799 system). Beta Pictoris c is the closest exoplanet to its star ever photographed with the observed separation roughly the same as the distance between the asteroid belt and the Sun, while Beta Pictoris d is the first directly imaged planet discovered by moderate-resolution spectroscopy method. Previous observations dating as far back as 2014 showed that Beta Pictoris d had been visually very close to the star or Beta Pictoris b, potentially delaying its detection.
	Beta Pictoris c (β Pic c)	1.2 ± 0.1	←	8.89 ± 0.75	
	Dimidium (51 Pegasi b)	1.2 ± 0.1	←	0.46 ^{+0.06}_{−0.01}	First exoplanet to be discovered orbiting a main-sequence star. Prototype of the hot Jupiters. While previously assumed to have a large radius of 1.9 ± 0.3 R_{J} based on the visible light spectrum being allegedly detected which results in a high albedo and an inflated hot Jupiter, recent studies find no evidence of reflected light, ruling out the radii and albedo estimates from previous studies and resulting in Dimidium being a likely low-albedo planet with the given radius.
	HR 8799 b	1.19 ± 0.03	←	6.0 ^{+0.4}_{−0.3}	First directly imaged planetary system having multiple exoplanets and first directly imaged exoplanet along with HR 8799 c and HR 8799 d to have their orbital motion confirmed. This planet orbits inside a dusty disk like the Solar Kuiper belt.
	Ahra (WD 0806-661 b)	1.17 ± 0.07; 1.12 ± 0.07	¿	6.8 – 9.0, 6.3 – 9.4; (Note: Assuming the planet's age is 2 ± 0.5 Gyr); 0.45 – 1.75 (Note: Assuming the planet's age is 60 – 180 Myr)	First planet discovered around a single (as opposed to binary) white dwarf, and the coldest directly imaged exoplanet when discovered. Possibly formed closer to Maru (WD 0806−661) when it was a main sequence star, this object migrated further away as it reached the end of its life (see stellar evolution), with a current separation of about 2500 AU. Alternatively, based on its large distance from the white dwarf, it likely formed like a star rather than in a protoplanetary disk, and it is generally described as a (sub-)brown dwarf, the dimmest sub-brown dwarf, in the scientific literature. However, the IAU considers objects below the ~13 M_{J} limiting mass for deuterium fusion that orbit stars (or stellar remnants) to be planets, regardless on how they formed. The water vapor, ammonia and methane are mostly abundance in Ahra atmosphere while the molecules carbon monoxide and carbon dioxide, though not detected, are able to be determined by their upper limits of their abundance. This is mostly consistent with Y0 dwarfs. However, some results are at odds with that dwarfs, such as the non-detection of water clouds and the mixing ratio of ammonia. The retrieved masses of 0.45 – 1.75 M_{J} is smaller than expected masses (6.3 – 9.4 M_{J}), possibly hinting at a younger age or an incorrect retrieved mass. By comparison, the age of Maru is 1.5 – 2.7 Gyr.
	TRAPPIST-1	1.160 ± 0.013 (0.1192 ± 0.0013 R_{☉})	#	94.1 ± 2.4 (0.0898 ± 0.0023 M_{☉})	Coldest and smallest known star hosting exoplanets. All seven planets are rocky planets, orbiting closer to the star than Mercury. Their orbits' inclinations of 0.1 degrees makes TRAPPIST-1 system the flattest planetary system. Age: 7.6 ± 2.2 Gyr. Reported for reference.
	HD 189733 Ab	1.138 ± 0.027	←	1.123 ± 0.045	First exoplanet to have its thermal map constructed, its overall color (deep blue) determined, its transit viewed in the X-ray spectrum, one of first two exoplanets (other being "Osiris") to be observed spectroscopically and first to have carbon dioxide confirmed as being present in its atmosphere. Such the rich cobalt blue colour of HD 189733 Ab may be the result of Rayleigh scattering. The wind can blow up to 8,700 km/h (5,400 mph) from the day side to the night side.
	SWEEPS-11	1.13 ± 0.21	←	9.7 ± 5.6	One of two most distant planets (other being SWEEPS-04) discovered at a distance of 27 710 ly (8500 pc).
	HR 8799 e	1.13 ± 0.05	←	9.6 ^{+1.9}_{−1.8}	First directly imaged planetary system having multiple exoplanets and the first exoplanet to be directly observed using optical interferometry.
	2MASS J0523−1403	1.129 ± 0.058 (0.116 ± 0.006 R_{☉})	#	73.3 (0.07 M_{☉})	Coolest main sequence star with effective temperature 1939 K (1666 °C; 3031 °F) and one of the smallest stars, in both radius and mass. Reported for reference.
	WASP-47 b	1.128 ± 0.013	←	1.144 ± 0.023	Super Earth WASP-47 e orbits even closer than hot Jupiter WASP-47 b and both hot Neptune WASP-47 d and outer gas planet WASP-47 c orbit further than the hot Jupiter, making WASP-47 system the only planetary system to have both planets near the hot Jupiter and another planet much further out.
	Gliese 900 b (CW2335+0142)	1.11	←	10.5	This exoplanet has the largest observed host star separation of any confirmed exoplanet, at 12 000 AU (0.058 pc; 0.19 ly) and the longest known orbital period, at a duration of 1.27 Myr. It is the first confirmed and third discovered circumtriple planet. Radius is an estimate.
	CoRoT-3b	1.08 ± 0.05	*	21.44 ^{+0.96}_{−0.97}; 21.66 ± 1.00	Might be considered either a planet or a brown dwarf, depending on the definition chosen for these terms. If the brown dwarf/planet limit is defined by mass regime using the deuterium burning limit as the delimiter (i.e. 13 M_{J}), CoRoT-3 b is a brown dwarf. If formation is the criterion, CoRoT-3 b may be a planet given that some models of planet formation predict that planets with masses up to 25–30 Jupiter masses can form via core accretion. However, it is unclear which method of formation created CoRoT-3 b. The issue is clouded further by the orbital properties of CoRoT-3 b: brown dwarfs located close to their stars are rare, while the majority of the known massive close-in planets (e.g., XO-3b, HAT-P-2b and WASP-14b) are in highly eccentric orbits, in contrast to the circular orbit of CoRoT-3 b. At the time of discovery, CoRoT-3 b, if a planet, had the highest mean density of 26,400 kg/m^{3} among the planets.
	Epsilon Indi Ab (ε Ind b)	1.038 ^{+0.012}_{−0.009}	←	6.50 ^{+0.72}_{−0.59}	Nearest extrasolar planet directly imaged. Second closest Jovian exoplanet to the Solar System, after AEgir [sic] (ε Eridani b). (Note: It would be the third closest if the free-floating object WISE 0855-0714 is counted as a planet.)
	Kepler-90h	1.0036 ± 0.0273 (11.25 ± 0.306 R_{🜨})	←	0.6387 ± 0.0157 – 0.6387 ± 0.0503 (203 ± 5 – 203 ± 16 M_{🜨})	Located in the Kepler-90 system with eight known exoplanets, whose architecture is similar to that of the Solar System, with rocky planets being closer to the star and gas giants being more distant and having the same number of observed planets. This planet is located at 1.01 AU from its star, which is within the habitable zone of Kepler-90 and thus could theoretically have a habitable Earth-like exomoon.
	Jupiter	1 (11.209 R_{🜨}) (Note: Refers to the level of 1 bar atmospheric pressure) (71 492 km) (Note: While the recently updated Jupiter's radius of 71488 ± 0.4 km is more accurate, the IAU recommend to use exactly 71 492 km as radius for Jupiter to make values given in Jupiter radii comparable with each other, notwithstanding the subsequent improvements in measurement precision of Jupiter's radius.)	#	1 (317.827 M_{🜨}); 1.898 125 × 10^{27} kg)	Oldest, largest and most massive planet in the Solar System; this planet hosts 115 known moons including the Galilean moons. Reported for reference.
	IRAS 04125+2902 b (TIDYE-1 b)	0.958 ^{+0.077}_{−0.075}	←	< 0.3 (< 90 M_{🜨})	Youngest transiting exoplanet discovered, with an age of just three Myr. This planet will shed its outer layers during its evolution, becoming either a sub-Neptune, super-Earth or a sub-Saturn, with the radius shrinking to 1.5 – 4 R_{🜨} if the planet becomes a super-Neptune or 4 – 7 R_{🜨} if it becomes a sub-Saturn.
	WD 1856 b (TOI-1690 b, WD 1856+534 b)	0.911 ± 0.054	←	4.3 – 10.9	Coldest exoplanet directly detected at a temperature of 186 ^{+6}_{−7} K and first and only transiting true planet to be observed orbiting a white dwarf. This gas giant orbits its host star closely at a distance of 0.02 AU. This indicates that the planet may have migrated inward after its host star evolved from a red giant to a white dwarf, otherwise it would have been engulfed by its star. This migration may be related to the fact that WD 1856+534 system belongs to a hierarchical triple-star system: the white dwarf and its planet are gravitationally bound to a distant binary companion, G 229-20AB, which itself consists two red dwarf stars. Gravitational interactions with the companion stars may have triggered the planet's migration through the Lidov–Kozai mechanism in a manner similar to some hot Jupiters. Another alternative hypothesis is that the planet instead has survived a common envelope phase. In the latter scenario, other planets engulfed before may have contributed to the expulsion of the stellar envelope. JWST observations seem to disfavour the formation via common envelope and instead favour high eccentricity migration.
	WISE 0855−0714	0.89	†	3.44, 4.33, ≤12; ~3 – 10	Coldest (sub-)brown dwarf discovered, having a temperature of about 285 K (12 °C; 53 °F). It is also the fourth-closest very massive object and closest sub-brown dwarf (or possibly rogue planet) to the Sun at the distance of 7.43 ± 0.04 ly (2.278 ± 0.012 pc). The mass and age of WISE 0855−0714 are neither known with certainty and the mass is depending on surface gravity values. But deuterium was detected, confirming it to be less massive than the deuterium burning limit.
	TOI-2535 b	0.844 ^{+0.027}_{−0.029}	←	0.472	First exoplanet to stop transiting its parent star from Earth's vantage point. At the time of its discovery, TOI-2535 b is also the exoplanet with the largest inclination change ever observed orbiting a single star. The orbital dynamics suggests that it is in orbital resonance with another hidden giant planet in a highly mutually inclined orbit.
	Saturn	0.843 (9.449 R_{🜨})	#	0.299 42 (95.16 M_{🜨})	Second oldest and least dense planet in the Solar System; this planet hosts the most number of moons of 293 known moons including Rhea and Titan. While the gas giants do have ring systems, Saturn is the most notable for its visible ring system. Reported for reference.
For smaller exoplanets, see the list of smallest exoplanets or other lists of exoplanets. For exoplanets with milestones, see the list of exoplanet extremes and list of exoplanet firsts.

== Candidates for largest exoplanets ==
=== Exoplanets with uncertain radii ===
This list contains planets with uncertain radii that could be below or above the adopted cut-off of 1.6 R_{J}, depending on the estimate, and those with theoretical estimated radius.

Key (Classification)
*	Probably brown dwarfs (≳ 13 M_{J}) (based on mass)
†	Probably sub-brown dwarfs (≲ 13 M_{J}) (based on mass and location)
←	Probably planets (≲ 13 M_{J}) (based on mass)
?	System status uncertain (inconsistency in age or mass of planetary system)
→	Planets with grazing transit, hindering radius determination

Key (Illustration)
Artist's impression
Direct imaging telescopic observation
Artist's impression size comparison
Orbit size comparison

Illustration	Name (Alternates)	Radius (R_{J})	Key	Mass (M_{J})	Notes
	TOI-1408 b	2.23 ± 0.36, (Note: Converted from 25±4 R_{🜨}.); 2.4 ± 0.5, > 1, 1.5, (Note: Estimate)	→	1.86 ± 0.02	A large radius of 2.23–2.4 R_{J} has been derived from transit photometry, but this value is likely inaccurate due to the grazing transit of TOI-1408 b; it transits only part of the star's surface, thus hindering a precise measurement of planet-to-star size ratio. The study revealed a clear transit-timing variations (TTV) signal for TOI-1408 b, discovering super-Neptune TOI-1408 c which orbits closer to TOI-1408, and claims that their photodynamical modeling could constrain TOI-1408 b's radius more reliably, which needs to be confirmed.
	WASP-78b	1.59 ± 0.10 – 1.93 ± 0.45	←	0.89 ± 0.08	This planet has likely undergone in the past a migration from the initial highly eccentric orbit. Previous radii include: 1.70 ± 0.04 R_{J}.
	TOI-2193 Ab	> 1.55 (Note: 95% lower limit)	→	0.94 ± 0.18	Grazing planet, a large reported radius of 1.77 R_{J} is unreliable. Whether it is larger than 1.6 R_{J} is unknown.
	XO-6b (TOI-1651 b)	1.517 ± 0.176 – 2.17 ± 0.2; 1.42 – 1.93	←	4.47 ± 0.12	A very puffy hot Jupiter. Large size needs confirmation due to size discrepancy.
	HIP 65Ab (TOI-129 b)	< 1.5 – 2.03+0.61 −0.49	→	3.213 ± 0.078	Grazing planet.
	GSC 06214-00210 b	1.49 ^{+0.10}_{−0.12} – 2.0, 1.91 ± 0.07	*	21 ± 6; 15.5 ± 0.5	Has a circumsubstellar disk found by polarimetry.
	HD 135344 Ab (SAO 206463 b)	1.45 ^{+0.06}_{−0.03} – 1.60 ^{+0.07}_{−0.06}	←	~10 ^{+1.4}_{−1.9}	Youngest directly imaged planet that has fully formed and orbits on Solar System scale. This planet formed in the vicinity of the snowline and later migrated to current position during its formation phase. Part of binary system HD 135344.
	TOI-3540 b	> 1.44	→	1.18 ± 0.14	Grazing planet, a large reported radius of 2.10 R_{J} is unreliable. Whether it is larger than 1.6 R_{J} is unknown.
	HD 143811 b	1.41 ± 0.03 – 1.7 ^{+0.7}_{−0.4}	←	6.1 ^{+0.7}_{−0.9}	First directly imaged planet discovered orbiting near around the binary stars. The closeness suggests that HD 143811 b almost certainly formed around the stars, rather than being a captured rogue planet, or one flung far from its original location. Some news outlets compare this to Tatooine, a fiction planet that orbits near to the binary stars Tatoo I and Tatoo II.
	Delorme 1b (2MASS J0103-5515 (AB) b, 2MASS0103 (AB) b)	1.4 – 1.9 ± 0.1	?	13 ± 1	The formation is unclear. The high accretion is in better agreement with a formation via disk fragmentation, hinting that it might have formed from a circumstellar disk. Giant planets and brown dwarfs are thought to form via disk fragmentation in rare cases in the outer regions of a disk (r > 50 AU). Teasdale & Stamatellos modelled three formation scenarios in which the planet could have formed. In the first two scenarios the planet forms in a massive disk via gravitational instability, resulting in having accretion and separation comparable to the observed ones, yet more massive than Delorme 1 b. In a third scenario the planet forms via core accretion in a less massive disk much closer to the binary, resulting in having its mass and accretion similar to the observed ones, but the separation being smaller.
	Beta Pictoris b (β Pic b)	1.37 ± 0.02; 1.680 ± 0.003	←	11.90 ^{+2.93}_{−3.04}	First exoplanet to have its rotation rate measured and one of the fastest-spinning planets discovered at the equator speed of 19.9 ± 1.0 km/s (12.37 ± 0.62 mi/s) or 71,640 ± 3,600 km/h (44,520 ± 2,240 mph). First unambiguous detection of auroral radio emission from an exoplanet and first such direct field strength measurement for an exoplanet, and second planetary system to have the exoplanet's orbital motion confirmed (after HR 8799 system). The given radius depends on the method used for modelling the planet's spectrum. Beta Pictoris b is suspected to have an exomoon due to the former's predicted obliquity misalignment.
	HD 106906 b	1.30 ± 0.06 – 1.74 ± 0.06; 1.54 ^{+0.04}_{−0.05}	†	11 ± 2	This planet orbits around HD 106906 at the separation of 738 AU, a distance much larger than what is possible for a planet formed within a protoplanetary disk. Observations made by the Hubble Space Telescope strengthened the case for the planet having an unusual orbit that perturbed it from its host star's debris disk causing NASA and several news outlets to compare it to the hypothetical Planet Nine. (Note: Hypothetical Planet Nine may be challenged by the discovery of 2017 OF_{201} and Ammonite (2023 KQ_{14}) which their orbits are anti-aligned to the calculated orbit of Planet Nine. Their existence, which also means that there are likely many other similar objects that are just obscured from earth observation, challenges one of the leading arguments for Planet Nine, that its gravity causes trans-Neptunian objects to cluster into a distinct region. Nevertheless, it is possible that Planet Nine's existence is still there as the simulations do not disprove Planet Nine.) It was later found that its C/O ratio is similar to the stellar association it is located in, suggesting that HD 106906 b could have been captured into the system as a planetary-mass free-floating object. This does not rule out formation in a star-like manner.
	Nu Octantis Ab (ν Octantis Ab)	1.19 – >1.6	←	2.19 ± 0.11	Has the tightest orbit around a star in a binary star system with the ratio of semi-major axis of binary star orbit to that of a planet orbiting one of the stars of 2.06, the smallest ratio of such planets (see S-type planet). The formation and long-term stability of a planet on such a tight orbit and retrograde orbit relative to the binary's motion are challenging, but with the secondary being a white dwarf that lost most part of its mass during the evolution to a red giant and then to a white dwarf, both can be explained with either the instability of a former circumbinary planetary system that lead one of the planets to migrate inwards or by planetary formation by a second-generation protoplanetary disk that emerged from death of the white dwarf's progenitor. In the latter scenario, the radius is not yet excluded to be more than 1.6 R_{J}. The lower radius value is an estimate.
	GSC 08047-00232 B	1.17 – 1.85	*	25 ± 10	Third young brown dwarf companion to the host star among young, nearby associations.
	WISPIT 2c (TYC 5709-354-1 c)	0.91 – 1.07; 1.78 – 2.20	←	8 – 12	Second system (after PDS 70) to host multiple directly imaged young giant planets in formation and one of the first three planetary systems (with HD 169142 and HD 97048) to have its circumstellar disk extended with a multi-ringed substructure and is candidate to be the first unambiguously detected in a multi-ringed disk. This inner candidate planet was detected but could also have been a dust clump and needed further observations to be confirmed as a planet, followed by a confirmation in 2026. The radius depends on the temperature and evolutionary isochrones of this planet.

=== Unconfirmed exoplanets/objects ===
These planets are also larger than 1.6 times the size of the largest planet in the Solar System, Jupiter, but have yet to be confirmed or are disputed.
Note: Some data may be unreliable or incorrect due to unit or conversion errors and objects with unknown mass are unclassified object otherwise stated

Key (Classification)
*	Probably brown dwarfs (≳ 13 M_{J}) (based on mass)
†	Probably sub-brown dwarfs (≲ 13 M_{J}) (based on mass and location)
←	Probably planets (≲ 13 M_{J}) (based on mass)
X	Unclassified object (unknown mass)
–	Theoretical planet size restrictions

Key (Illustration)
Artist's impression
Direct imaging telescopic observation
Composite image of direct observations
Graphic chart

Illustration	Name (Alternates) (Status)	Radius (R_{J})	Key	Mass (M_{J})	Notes
	New born planet limit	~30	–	≤ 20 (≤ 13)	Theoretical size limit of a newly-formed planet.
	Young Hot Jupiter limit	~20	–	≤ 10	Theoretical size limit of a newly-formed planet that needed 10^{4} – 10^{5} (10000 – 100000) years to migrate close to the host star, but has not yet interacted with it beforehand.
	FU Orionis North b (FU Ori Ab) (unconfirmed)	~9.8 (~1.0 R_{☉})	←	~3	Discovered using a variation of disk kinematics. Tidal disruption and extreme evaporation made the planet radius shrink from the beginning of the burst (14 R_{J}) in 1937 to the present year by ~30 per cent and its mass is around half of its initial mass of 6 M_{J}.
	UCAC4 174-179953 b (unclassified)	8.14 ± 0.40 (0.84 R_{☉})	X	Unknown	Object cannot be classified as brown dwarf or exoplanet without a mass estimate.
	UCAC4 220-040923 b (unclassified)	4.65 ± 0.20	X	Unknown	Object cannot be classified as brown dwarf or exoplanet without a mass estimate.
	UCAC4 223-042828 b (unclassified)	3.33 ± 0.50	X	Unknown	Object cannot be classified as brown dwarf or exoplanet without a mass estimate.
	UCAC4 185-192986 b (unclassified)	3.3 ± 0.2	X	Unknown	Object cannot be classified as brown dwarf or exoplanet without a mass estimate.
	UCAC4 118-126574 b (unclassified)	3.12 ± 0.10	X	Unknown	Object cannot be classified as brown dwarf or exoplanet without a mass estimate.
	UCAC4 171-187216 b (unclassified)	2.75 ± 0.20	X	Unknown	Object cannot be classified as brown dwarf or exoplanet without a mass estimate.
	KOI-7073 b (unclassified)	2.699 ^{+0.473}_{−0.794}	X	Unknown	Object cannot be classified as brown dwarf or exoplanet without a mass estimate.
	UCAC4 175-188215 b (unclassified)	2.69 ± 0.50	X	Unknown	Object cannot be classified as brown dwarf or exoplanet without a mass estimate.
	UCAC4 116-118563 b (unclassified)	2.62 ± 0.10	X	Unknown	Object cannot be classified as brown dwarf or exoplanet without a mass estimate.
	19g-2-01326 b (unclassified)	2.29 ^{+0.13}_{−0.61}	X	Unknown	Object cannot be classified as brown dwarf or exoplanet without a mass estimate.
	SOI-2 b (unclassified)	2.22	X	Unknown	Object cannot be classified as brown dwarf or exoplanet without a mass estimate.
	TIC 332350266 b (unclassified)	2.21±3.18	X	Unknown	Object cannot be classified as brown dwarf or exoplanet without a mass estimate.
	Old Hot Jupiter limit	2.2	–	> ~0.4	Theoretical limit for hot Jupiters close to a star, that are limited by tidal heating, resulting in 'runaway inflation'
	TIC 138664795 b (unclassified)	2.16 ± 0.16	X	Unknown	Object cannot be classified as brown dwarf or exoplanet without a mass estimate.
	UCAC4 221-041868 b (unclassified)	2.1 ± 0.20	X	Unknown	Object cannot be classified as brown dwarf or exoplanet without a mass estimate.
	TOI-496 b (unclassified)	2.05 ^{+0.63}_{−0.29}	X	Unknown	Object cannot be classified as brown dwarf or exoplanet without a mass estimate.
	HD 135344 Bb (SAO 206462 b) (disputed)	~2	←	2	First directly imaged planet that is actively forming within protoplanetary disk, specifically at the root of one of the disk's spiral arms in which the structure of the disk is the first one that exhibited a high degree of clarity and was observed using several space telescopes and ground-based telescopes, through an international research program of young stars and of stars with planets. However, the later study disputed this, attributed to an artifact in the data processing. Part of binary system HD 135344.
	SOI-7 b (unclassified)	1.96	X	Unknown	Object cannot be classified as brown dwarf or exoplanet without a mass estimate.
	UCAC4 121-140615 b (unclassified)	1.94 ± 0.20	X	Unknown	Object cannot be classified as brown dwarf or exoplanet without a mass estimate.
	UCAC4 123-150641 b (unclassified)	1.93 ± 0.20	X	Unknown	Object cannot be classified as brown dwarf or exoplanet without a mass estimate.
	TIC 274508785 b (unclassified)	1.92±2.37	X	Unknown	Object cannot be classified as brown dwarf or exoplanet without a mass estimate.
	W74 b (unclassified)	1.9	X	Unknown	Object cannot be classified as brown dwarf or exoplanet without a mass estimate.
	Mu^{2} Scorpii c (μ^{2} Scorpii c) (unconfirmed)	1.89 (Note: Based on the estimated temperature and luminosity via the Stefan-Boltzmann law.)	*	18.5±1.5	Mu^{2} Scorpii c (along with the confirmed planet 'b') are the first planet candidates to be detected around a supernova progenitor-star. It receives an insolation from its host star similar to that of Mercury, the most irradiated substellar companion discovered by direct imaging. The mass ratio to Pipirima (Mu^{2} Scorpii) of 0.0019 qualifies this object as planet even though its mass is above the deuterium-burning limit.
	TIC 116307482 b (unclassified)	1.89 ± 1.46	X	Unknown	Object cannot be classified as brown dwarf or exoplanet without a mass estimate.
	UCAC4 122-142653 b (unclassified)	1.85 ± 0.10	X	Unknown	Object cannot be classified as brown dwarf or exoplanet without a mass estimate.
	TIC 77173027 b (unclassified)	1.84 ± 1.12	X	Unknown	Object cannot be classified as brown dwarf or exoplanet without a mass estimate.
	TOI-159 Ab (unclassified)	1.80 ± 0.77	X	Unknown	Object cannot be classified as brown dwarf or exoplanet without a mass estimate.
	TIC 82205179 b (unclassified)	1.76 ± 0.56	X	Unknown	Object cannot be classified as brown dwarf or exoplanet without a mass estimate.
	UCAC4 124-144273 b (unclassified)	1.71 ± 0.10	X	Unknown	Object cannot be classified as brown dwarf or exoplanet without a mass estimate.
	TOI-710 b (unclassified)	1.66 ± 1.10	X	Unknown	Object cannot be classified as brown dwarf or exoplanet without a mass estimate.
	TOI-7081 b (unconfirmed)	1.65 ± 0.05	←	Unknown	While TOI-7081 b normally cannot be classified as brown dwarf or exoplanet without a mass estimate, the study found TOI-7081 b and TOI-7018 b are puffy but cool Jupiters which may be caused by delayed contraction due to inefficient internal heat transport, where composition gradients or layered convection slow cooling and prolong inflation. Future radial velocity observations can constrain eccentricities and test tidal heating as a possible factor.
	CVSO 30 c (PTFO 8-8695 c) (disputed)	1.63 ^{+0.87}_{−0.34}	←	4.7 ^{+5.5}_{−2.0}	CVSO 30 c was discovered by direct imaging, with a calculated mass equal to 4.7 M_{J}. However, the colors of the object suggest that it may actually be a background star, such as a K-type giant or a M-type subdwarf. If confirmed in the future, it would be the furthest planet to be directly imaged at a distance of about 1200 ly. Moreover, the phase of "dips" caused by suspected planet CVSO 30 b had drifted nearly 180 degrees from the expected value, thus ruling out the existence of the planet. CVSO 30 is also suspected to be a stellar binary, with the previously reported planetary orbital period equal to the rotation period of the companion star.
	TOI-7018 b (unconfirmed)	1.61 ± 0.04	←	Unknown	While TOI-7018 b normally cannot be classified as brown dwarf or exoplanet without a mass estimate, the study found TOI-7081 b and TOI-7018 b are puffy but cool Jupiters which may be caused by delayed contraction due to inefficient internal heat transport, where composition gradients or layered convection slow cooling and prolong inflation. Future radial velocity observations can constrain eccentricities and test tidal heating as a possible factor.

== Chronological list of largest exoplanets ==
These exoplanets were the largest at the time of their discovery.
Present day: 18 November 2026

Key (Classification)
*	Identified to be a probable/confirmed brown dwarf (≳ 13 M_{J}) or a star (≳ 78.5 M_{J})
⇗	Assumed largest exoplanet, but later identified to be probable/confirmed brown dwarf (≳ 13 M_{J}) or a star (≳ 78.5 M_{J})
↓	Assumed largest exoplanet, but later identified to be smaller in radius than originally determined
↑	Not assumed largest exoplanet, but later identified to be larger in radius than originally determined
†	Candidate for largest exoplanet (currently or in time span)
?	System status uncertain (inconsistency in age or mass of planetary system) while being candidate for largest exoplanet
→	Assumed largest exoplanet, while unconfirmed, later retracted and/or confirmed
←	Largest exoplanet (≲ 13 M_{J}) at the time
–	Largest confirmed exoplanet (in radius), while discovered candidates might be larger
#	Non-exoplanets reported for reference

Key (Illustration)
Artist's impression
Artist's impression size comparison
Direct Imaging telescopic observation
Transiting telescopic observation
Rendered image
Graphic chart
Discovery/Confirmation observatory

Years largest discovered	Illustration	Name (Alternates)	Radius at that time (R_{J})	Key	Mass (M_{J})	Notes
2025 – present		HAT-P-67 Ab	2.140 ± 0.025	–	0.45 ± 0.15	A very puffy hot Jupiter which is among planets with lowest densities of ~0.061 g/cm^{3}. Largest known planet with a precisely measured radius, as of 2025.
(2025 – present)		AB Aurigae b (AB Aur b, HD 31293 b)	< 2.75 (Note: This radius estimate might have been affected by the planet's circumplanetary disk, as the spectrum not necessarily corresponds to a planet photosphere.)	*	20	The commonly favored model for gas giant planet formation – core accretion – has significant difficulty forming massive gas giant planets at AB Aur b's very large separation from its host AB Aur. Instead, AB Aur b may be forming by disk (gravitational) instability, where as a massive disk around a star cools, gravity causes the disk to rapidly break up into one or more planet-mass fragments. A more recent study revised the apparent magnitude, making AB Aur b more likely to be brown dwarf.
(2024 – present)		XO-6b	2.17 ± 0.20	†	4.47 ± 0.12	A very puffy hot Jupiter. $R_p/R_*$ is consistent, but $R_*$ is either given as about 1.93 R_{☉} or about 1.42 R_{☉} in newer references. Large size needs confirmation due to size discrepancy.
(2024 – present)		XO-6b	1.517 ± 0.176	†	4.47 ± 0.12	A very puffy hot Jupiter. $R_p/R_*$ is consistent, but $R_*$ is either given as about 1.93 R_{☉} or about 1.42 R_{☉} in newer references. Large size needs confirmation due to size discrepancy.
(2024 – present)		XO-6b	2.08 ± 0.18	†	4.47 ± 0.12	A very puffy hot Jupiter. $R_p/R_*$ is consistent, but $R_*$ is either given as about 1.93 R_{☉} or about 1.42 R_{☉} in newer references. Large size needs confirmation due to size discrepancy.
(2024 – present)		XO-6b	1.57	†	4.47 ± 0.12	A very puffy hot Jupiter. $R_p/R_*$ is consistent, but $R_*$ is either given as about 1.93 R_{☉} or about 1.42 R_{☉} in newer references. Large size needs confirmation due to size discrepancy.
(2024 – present)		GQ Lupi b (GQ Lup Ab, GQ Lup B)	3.70	*	20 ± 10	First confirmed exoplanet candidate to be directly imaged.
2024 – 2025		HAT-P-67 Ab	2.038 ^{+0.067}_{−0.068}	–	0.418 ± 0.012	A very puffy hot Jupiter. At discovery the largest known planet with an accurately and precisely measured radius.
2024 – 2025		HAT-P-67 Ab	2.165 ^{+0.024}_{−0.022} (Note: Calculated using R_{p}/R_{⋆} multiplied by R_{⋆}. The value is later multiplied by (142984 km ÷ 1391400 km) to convert from R_{☉} to R_{J}.)	–	0.418 ± 0.012	A very puffy hot Jupiter. At discovery the largest known planet with an accurately and precisely measured radius.
(2022 – 2025)		AB Aurigae b (AB Aur b, HD 31293 b)	2.75	⇗	9, < 130, 10 – 12 (1 Myr); 20 (~ 4 Myr)	The commonly favored model for gas giant planet formation – core accretion – has significant difficulty forming massive gas giant planets at AB Aur b's very large separation from its host AB Aur. Instead, AB Aur b may be forming by disk (gravitational) instability, where as a massive disk around a star cools, gravity causes the disk to rapidly break up into one or more planet-mass fragments.
(2020 – present)		PDS 70b	2.7	†	6+6 −4	Has been later measured to have a radius of only 1.96 R_{J}, and then 2.7 R_{J} in 2022. Large size needs confirmation due to this discrepancy.
(2020 – present)		PDS 70b	1.96 ^{+0.20}_{−0.17}	†	6+6 −4	Has been later measured to have a radius of only 1.96 R_{J}, and then 2.7 R_{J} in 2022. Large size needs confirmation due to this discrepancy.
(2020 – present)		PDS 70b	2.09 ^{+0.23}_{−0.31} – 2.72 ^{+0.15}_{−0.17}	†	7.9 ^{+4.9}_{−4.7};	Has been later measured to have a radius of only 1.96 R_{J}, and then 2.7 R_{J} in 2022. Large size needs confirmation due to this discrepancy.
(2020 – present)		SR 12 c (SR 12 (AB) c, SR 12 C)	2.38 ^{+0.27}_{−0.32}	?	13 ± 2	The planet is at the very edge of the deuterium burning limit. Mass being below it needs confirmation. The nature of the disk is unclear: Assuming the disk has only 1 mm grains, the dust mass of the disk is 0.012 M_{🜨} (0.95 M_{☾}). For a disk only made of 1 μm grains, it would have a dust mass of 0.054 M_{🜨} (4.4 M_{☾}). The disk also contains gas, as is indicated by the accretion of hydrogen, with the gas mass being on the order of 0.03 M_{J} (about 9.5 M_{🜨}). Other sources of masses includes 14 ^{+7}_{−8} M_{J}, 12 – 15 M_{J}.
(2019 – present)		HD 114762 Ab ("Latham's Planet")	Unknown	*	306.93 (0.293 M_{☉})	It was thought to be the first discovered exoplanet until 2019, when it was confirmed to be a low-mass star with the mass of 107 ^{+20}_{−27} M_{J} (and later reviewed up to 147.0 ^{+39.3}_{−42.0} M_{J} in 2020 and 306.93 M_{J} (0.293 M_{☉}) in 2022).
(2019 – present)		HD 114762 Ab ("Latham's Planet")	Unknown	*	147.0 ^{+39.3}_{−42.0} (Note: convert to: 0.140 ^{+0.038}_{−0.040} M_{☉})	It was thought to be the first discovered exoplanet until 2019, when it was confirmed to be a low-mass star with the mass of 107 ^{+20}_{−27} M_{J} (and later reviewed up to 147.0 ^{+39.3}_{−42.0} M_{J} in 2020 and 306.93 M_{J} (0.293 M_{☉}) in 2022).
(2019 – present)		HD 114762 Ab ("Latham's Planet")	Unknown	*	107 ^{+20}_{−27} (Note: coverts to: 0.102 ^{+0.019}_{−0.026} M_{☉})	It was thought to be the first discovered exoplanet until 2019, when it was confirmed to be a low-mass star with the mass of 107 ^{+20}_{−27} M_{J} (and later reviewed up to 147.0 ^{+39.3}_{−42.0} M_{J} in 2020 and 306.93 M_{J} (0.293 M_{☉}) in 2022).
(2019 – present)		Kepler-13 Ab	1.91 ± 0.25 – 2.57 ± 0.26	†	9.28±0.16	Discovered by Kepler in first four months of Kepler data. A more recent analysis argues that a third-light correction factor of 1.818 is needed, to correct for the light blending of Kepler-13 B, resulting in higher radii results.
(2018 – 2024)		WASP-76b	1.842±0.024	↓	0.921±0.032	A very puffy hot Jupiter.
(2018 – 2024)		WASP-76b	2.083 ^{+0.083}_{−0.063}	↓	0.921±0.032	A very puffy hot Jupiter.
2017 – 2024		HAT-P-67 Ab	2.085 ^{+0.096}_{−0.071}	–	0.34 ^{+0.25}_{−0.19}	A very puffy hot Jupiter. At discovery the largest known planet with an accurately and precisely measured radius.
(2017 – 2017)		XO-6b	1.550 ± 0.194	↓	4.47 ± 0.12	A very puffy hot Jupiter.
(2017 – 2017)		XO-6b	2.07 ± 0.22	↓	4.47 ± 0.12	A very puffy hot Jupiter.
(2015 – 2017)		Dimidium (51 Peg b)	1.9 ± 0.3	→	0.46 ^{+0.06}_{−0.01}	First convincing exoplanet discovered orbiting a main-sequence star. A prototype hot Jupiter. In 2015, a study allegedly detected visible light spectrum from Dimidium using the High Accuracy Radial Velocity Planet Searcher (HARPS) instrument. This suggested a high albedo for the planet, hence a large radius up to 1.9 ± 0.3 R_{J}, which could suggest 51 Pegasi b would be an inflated hot Jupiter. However, recent studies found no evidence of reflected light, ruling out the previous radii and albedo estimates from previous studies with Dimidium being likely a low-albedo planet with a radius around 1.2±0.1 R_{J}.
(2015 – 2017)		Saffar (υ Andromedae Ab)	~1.8 (Note: Estimated using the phase curve of reflected light)	†	1.70 ^{+0.33}_{−0.24}	First multiple-planet system to be discovered around a main-sequence star, and first multiple-planet system known in a multiple-star system. New reference finds ~1.8 R_{J} more likely, but the original ~1.36 R_{J} are also given. Large size needs confirmation.
(2014 – present)		ROXs 42B b	2.10 ± 0.35	†	9 ^{+6}_{−3}; 10 ± 4	Large size needs confirmation. Other estimates include 1.9 – 2.4 R_{J}, 1.3 – 4.7 R_{J}. Other recent sources of masses include 3.2 – 27 M_{J}, 13 ± 5 M_{J}.
(2014 – present)		ROXs 42B b	2.43 ± 0.18 – 2.55 ± 0.2	†	9 ^{+6}_{−3}; 10 ± 4	Large size needs confirmation. Other estimates include 1.9 – 2.4 R_{J}, 1.3 – 4.7 R_{J}. Other recent sources of masses include 3.2 – 27 M_{J}, 13 ± 5 M_{J}.
(2012 – 2018)		Pollera (WASP-79b)	1.704 ^{+0.195}_{−0.180}	↓	0.850 ^{+0.180}_{−0.180}	This planet is orbiting the host star at nearly-polar orbit with respect to star's equatorial plane, inclination being equal to −95.2 ^{+0.9}_{−1.0}°.
(2012 – 2018)		Pollera (WASP-79b)	1.70 ± 0.11 – 2.09 ± 0.14	↓	0.850 ^{+0.180}_{−0.180}	This planet is orbiting the host star at nearly-polar orbit with respect to star's equatorial plane, inclination being equal to −95.2 ^{+0.9}_{−1.0}°.
(2012 – 2017)		WASP-78b	1.59 ± 0.10	†	0.89 ± 0.08	Large size needs confirmation due to size discrepancy.
(2012 – 2017)		WASP-78b	1.93 ± 0.45	†	0.89 ± 0.08	Large size needs confirmation due to size discrepancy.
(2012 – 2017)		WASP-78b	2.06 ± 0.10	†	0.89 ± 0.08	Large size needs confirmation due to size discrepancy.
(2012 – 2017)		WASP-78b	1.70 ± 0.04	†	0.89 ± 0.08	Large size needs confirmation due to size discrepancy.
(2011 – 2017)		HAT-P-32b (HAT-P-32 Ab)	1.822 ^{+0.350}_{−0.236}	†	0.941 ± 0.166, 0.860 ± 0.164	The radius is dependent on whether the orbit is circular or eccentric. Later shown to be most likely close to the lower end of the originally possible radius range.
(2011 – 2017)		HAT-P-32b (HAT-P-32 Ab)	1.789 ± 0.025 – 2.04 ± 0.10	†	0.941 ± 0.166, 0.860 ± 0.164	The radius is dependent on whether the orbit is circular or eccentric. Later shown to be most likely close to the lower end of the originally possible radius range.
2011 – 2017		HAT-P-33b	1.85 ± 0.49	↑	0.72 ^{+0.13}_{−0.12}	Later proven to be most likely the largest at the time. The radius is dependent on whether the orbit is circular or eccentric.
2011 – 2017		HAT-P-33b	1.686 ± 0.045 – 1.827 ± 0.290	↑	0.72 ^{+0.13}_{−0.12}	Later proven to be most likely the largest at the time. The radius is dependent on whether the orbit is circular or eccentric.
2010 – 2011		Ditsö̀ (WASP-17b)	1.74 ^{+0.26}_{−0.23}	–	0.512 ± 0.037	First planet discovered to have a retrograde orbit and first to have quartz (crystalline silica, SiO_{2}) in the clouds of an exoplanet. Puffiest and possibly largest exoplanet at the time of discovery. Extremely low density of 0.08 g/cm^{3}.
(2008 – present)		CT Chamaeleontis b (CT Cha b)	~2.4	*	17 ± 6	Possibly the largest planet.
(2008 – present)		CT Chamaeleontis b (CT Cha b)	2.6 ^{+1.2}_{−0.2}	*	17 ± 6	Possibly the largest planet.
(2008 – present)		CT Chamaeleontis b (CT Cha b)	3.3 – 5.4	*	17 ± 6	Possibly the largest planet.
(2008 – present)		CT Chamaeleontis b (CT Cha b)	2.20 ^{+0.81}_{−0.60}	*	17 ± 6	Possibly the largest planet.
2007 – 2010		TrES-4 (Note: While other sources usually use the "b" suffix for planets discovered by Trans-Atlantic Exoplanet Survey (TrES), the TrES and the SIMBAD do not use the "b" suffix typically used in extrasolar planet designations.) (GSC 02620-00648 Ab)	1.674 ± 0.094	–	0.78 ± 0.19	Largest confirmed exoplanet ever found and least dense planet of 0.17 g/cm^{3}, about that of balsa wood, less than Saturn's 0.7 g/cm^{3}, at the time of discovery.
2007 – 2007		WASP-1 Ab	1.484 ^{+0.059}_{−0.091}	↑	0.860 ± 0.072	Later proven to be the largest at the time.
2007 – 2007		WASP-1 Ab	≥1.33	↑	0.860 ± 0.072	Later proven to be the largest at the time.
2007 – 2007		HAT-P-1b (ADS 16402 Bb)	1.319 ± 0.019	–	0.529 ± 0.020	The planet appears to be at least as large in radius, and smaller in mean density, than any previously known planet.
2007 – 2007		HAT-P-1b (ADS 16402 Bb)	~1.36	–	0.529 ± 0.020	The planet appears to be at least as large in radius, and smaller in mean density, than any previously known planet.
(2007 – 2024)		GQ Lupi b (GQ Lup Ab, GQ Lup B)	3.0 ± 0.5	*	~ 20 (1 – 39)	First confirmed exoplanet candidate to be directly imaged. It is believed to be several times more massive than Jupiter. Because the theoretical models which are used to predict planetary masses for objects in young star systems like GQ Lupi b are still tentative, the mass cannot be precisely specified, giving the masses of 1 – 39 M_{J}.
(2007 – 2024)		GQ Lupi b (GQ Lup Ab, GQ Lup B)	3.50 ^{+1.50}_{−1.03}	*	~ 25 (4 – 155)	First confirmed exoplanet candidate to be directly imaged. It is believed to be several times more massive than Jupiter. Because the theoretical models which are used to predict planetary masses for objects in young star systems like GQ Lupi b are still tentative, the mass cannot be precisely specified, giving the masses of 1 – 39 M_{J}.
(2006 – present)		DH Tauri b (DH Tau b)	2.51 ± 0.16	†	8.4 ± 1.1	Mass being below the deuterium burning limit needs confirmation. Temperature originally given as 2700 – 2800 K. Other sources give the radii: 2.49 R_{J}, (Note: Based on the estimated temperature and luminosity via the Stefan-Boltzmann law.) and masses: 11 ± 3 M_{J} and 14.2 ^{+2.4}_{−3.5} M_{J}
(2006 – present)		DH Tauri b (DH Tau b)	2.6 ± 0.6	†	11.3 ± 2.2	Mass being below the deuterium burning limit needs confirmation. Temperature originally given as 2700 – 2800 K. Other sources give the radii: 2.49 R_{J}, and masses: 11 ± 3 M_{J} and 14.2 ^{+2.4}_{−3.5} M_{J}
(2006 – present)		DH Tauri b (DH Tau b)	2.68	†	12 ± 4	Mass being below the deuterium burning limit needs confirmation. Temperature originally given as 2700 – 2800 K. Other sources give the radii: 2.49 R_{J}, and masses: 11 ± 3 M_{J} and 14.2 ^{+2.4}_{−3.5} M_{J}
(2006 – present)		DH Tauri b (DH Tau b)	2.7 ± 0.8	†	17 ± 6	Mass being below the deuterium burning limit needs confirmation. Temperature originally given as 2700 – 2800 K. Other sources give the radii: 2.49 R_{J}, and masses: 11 ± 3 M_{J} and 14.2 ^{+2.4}_{−3.5} M_{J}
(2006 – present)		DH Tauri b (DH Tau b)	1.75	†	11.5 ^{+10.5}_{−3.1}	Mass being below the deuterium burning limit needs confirmation. Temperature originally given as 2700 – 2800 K. Other sources give the radii: 2.49 R_{J}, and masses: 11 ± 3 M_{J} and 14.2 ^{+2.4}_{−3.5} M_{J}
2006 – 2007		HD 209458 b ("Osiris")	1.27 ± 0.02	–	0.682 ^{+0.014}_{−0.015}	First known transiting exoplanet, first precisely measured planet available, first to have its orbital speed measured, determining its mass directly, one of first two exoplanets (other being HD 189733 Ab) to be observed spectroscopically and first to have an atmosphere, containing evaporating hydrogen, and first to have contained oxygen and carbon. This planet is on process of stripping its atmosphere due to extreme "hydrodynamic drag" created by its evaporating hydrogen atmosphere. Nicknamed "Osiris".
(2005 – 2007)		GQ Lupi b (GQ Lup B)	~ 2	⇗	~ 2	First confirmed exoplanet candidate to be directly imaged.
1999 – 2006		HD 209458 b ("Osiris")	1.27 ± 0.02	←	0.682 ^{+0.014}_{−0.015}	First known transiting exoplanet, first precisely measured radius available, first to have its orbital speed measured, determining its mass directly, and first to have an atmosphere, containing evaporating hydrogen, and first to have contained oxygen and carbon. First extrasolar gas giant to have its superstorm measured. Nicknamed "Osiris".
(1996 – 1999)		Saffar (υ Andromedae Ab)	Unknown	†	0.74 ± 0.07	About 20 – 25 planets including Saffar were found within this time span via the radial velocity method, none of them had radius measurements shortly after their discoveries. As expected, Dimidium is larger than Poltergeist, whether one of the additional planets found till 1999 is larger than Dimidium is not clear to this day. Saffar has a phase curve measurement (see 2015), but confirmation of being larger than Dimidium is still needed. 16 Cygni Bb is the first eccentric Jupiter and first in a double star system to be discovered while Taphao Thong (47 UMa b) is the first long-period planet around a main sequence star to be discovered. Gliese 876 b is also the first planet to be discovered orbiting a red dwarf.
(1996 – 1999)		various	Unknown	†	0.49 – 8.35	
1996 – 1999		Dimidium (51 Peg b)	Unknown	–	0.46 ^{+0.06}_{−0.01}	First convincing exoplanet discovered orbiting a main-sequence star. A prototype hot Jupiter.
1995 – 1996		Dimidium (51 Peg b)	Unknown	←	0.46 ^{+0.06}_{−0.01}	First convincing exoplanet discovered orbiting a main-sequence star. A prototype hot Jupiter.
(1993 – 1995)		PSR B1620−26 b ("Methuselah")	Unknown	→	2.5 ± 1	Likely larger than Poltergeist, but not confirmed as planet until 2003. First circumbinary planet, first planet to be found in a globular cluster and the oldest planet to be discovered (until 2020) at the age of 11.2–12.7 billion years old, hence the nickname, "Methuselah".
1992 – 1995		Poltergeist (PSR B1257+12 c)	Unknown	←	0.01353 ± 0.00063 (4.3 ± 0.2 M_{🜨})	First confirmed planet ever discovered outside the Solar System together with the less massive Phobetor (PSR B1257+12 d), one of three pulsar planets known to be orbiting the pulsar Lich (PSR B1257+12). Lich planets are likely to form in a second round of planet formation as a result of merger of two white dwarfs into a pulsar star and a resulting disk of material in orbit around the star.
(1991 – 1992)		PSR 1829−10 b (PSR B1829−10 b)	Unknown	→	0.031 46 (10 M_{🜨})	First found "orbiting the neutron star PSR 1829-10" but in 1992 retracted before the discovery of Lich planets due to errors in calculations.
(1989 – 1995)		HD 114762 Ab ("Latham's Planet")	Unknown	⇗	11.069 ± 0.063, ~63.2	Discovered in 1989 by Latham to have a minimum mass of 11.069 ± 0.063 M_{J} (at 90°) and a probable mass of approximately 63.2 M_{J} (at 10°), making the former planet the first to be spotted, and confirmed in 1991, it was thought to be the first discovered exoplanet (or second if it included Tadmor during its evidence) until 2019 when it was confirmed to be a low-mass star with the mass of 107 ^{+20}_{−27} M_{J} (and later reviewed up to 147.0 ^{+39.3}_{−42.0} M_{J} in 2020 and 306.93 M_{J} (0.293 M_{☉}) in 2022), making one of the Lich planets the first exoplanet confirmed ever, or Dimidium, if the planet should have secured been formed in a first round of planet formation with the star.
(1988 – 1992)		Tadmor (Gamma Cephei Ab, γ Cep Ab)	Unknown	→	6.6 ^{+2.3}_{−2.8}	First evidence for exoplanet to receive later confirmation. First reported in 1988, making it arguably the first true exoplanet discovered, and independently in 1989, however, retracted in 1992 due to the possibility that the stellar activity of the star mimics a planet not allowing a solid discovery claim and then finally confirmed in 2003.
(Antiquity – 1992) (Note: Other ending years include 1988 and 1995)		Jupiter	1 (11.209 R_{🜨}) (Note: Refers to the level of 1 bar atmospheric pressure) (71 492 km)	#	1 (317.827 M_{🜨}) (1.898 125 × 10^{27} kg)	Oldest, largest and most massive planet in the Solar System Observations date back to 7th or 8th century BC. Using an early telescope the Galilean moons were discovered in 1610, the planet hosts 115 known moons. Photograph took in 1879, making Jupiter the first planet to have recognisable photo of a planet. Reported for reference.
For earlier entries, see early speculations and discredited claims.

== See also ==
- Lists of planets
- List of smallest exoplanets
- List of largest cosmic structures
- List of largest galaxies
- List of largest nebulae
- List of largest known stars
- List of transiting exoplanets
- List of directly imaged exoplanets
- Lists of astronomical objects
- List of most massive stars
