= XO-6b =

Hot Jupiter exoplanet orbiting the star XO-6

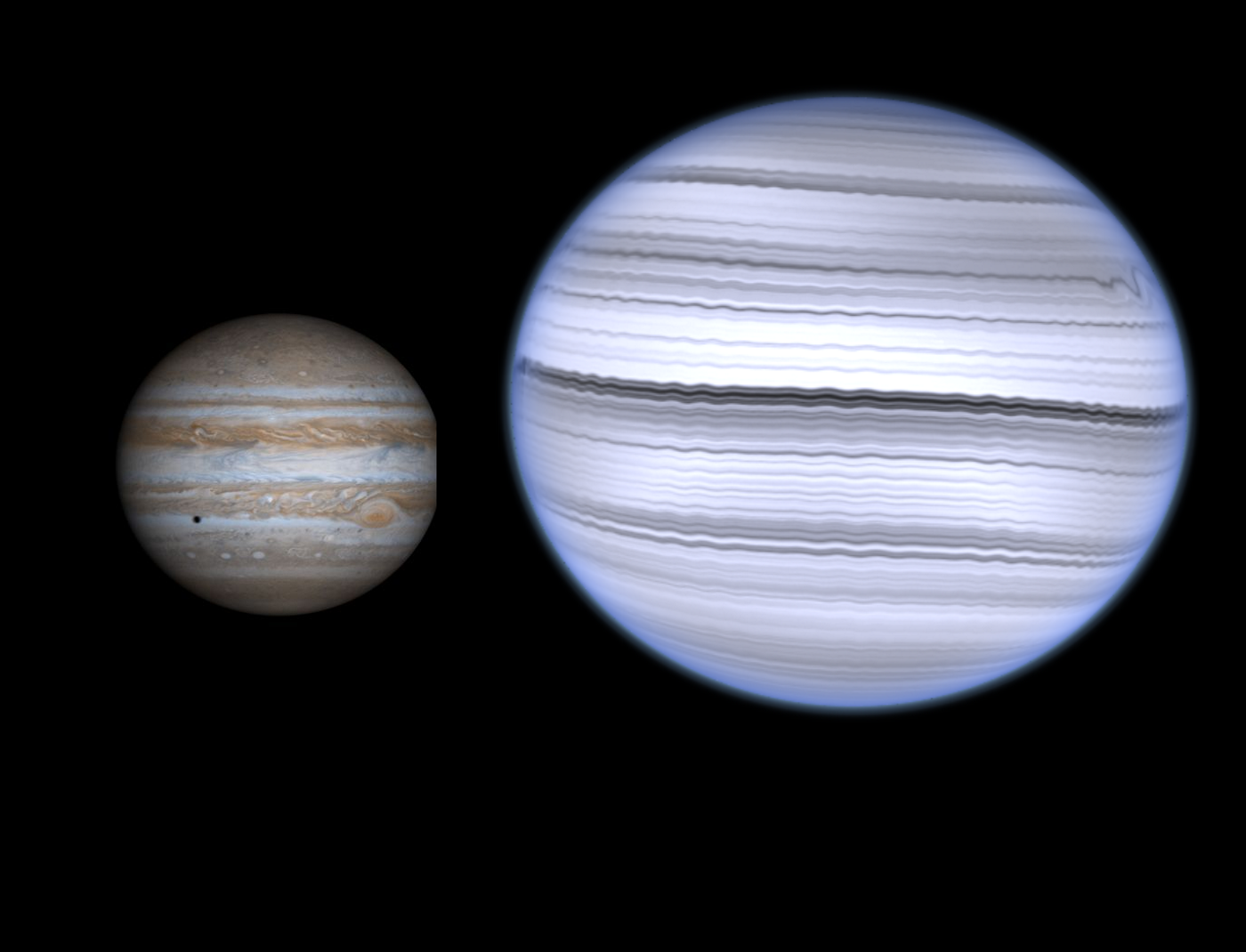
- Jupiter compared to XO-6b

Discovery
- Discovery site: Haleakalā Observatory in Maui, Hawaii
- Discovery date: December 8, 2016
- Detection method: Transit

Orbital characteristics
- Semi-major axis: 0.082±0.008 AU
- Eccentricity: 0.00 (fixed)
- Orbital period (sidereal): 3.7649923+45 −46 d
- Inclination: 84.77°+0.82° −0.66°
- Time of periastron: 2,458,843.93943±0.00012 JD
- Semi-amplitude: <450 m/s

Physical characteristics
- Mean radius: 1.52±0.17 R_{J}
- Mass: 4.47±0.12 M_{J}
- Temperature: 1,670±25 K

XO-6b is a transiting exoplanet, orbiting the star XO-6 around 760 light-years (230 parsecs) away from Earth. It was discovered in 2016 by the XO planet search team.

== Characteristics ==
XO-6b is classified as a hot Jupiter. The planet has an orbital period of just 3.8 days and an average orbital separation of 0.082 astronomical units. As of such, it is highly irradiated, with a surface temperature estimated to be around 1,670 K (1,400 °C). The planet's mass is estimated at 4.47±0.12 M_{J}. The discovery paper suggested a very large radius of 2.07±0.22 R_{J}, which would make it among the largest-known exoplanets, but more recent papers, considering the measurements of the host star's distance by the Gaia satellite, found the radius to be smaller, at around 1.5 R_{J}.

== Host star ==
XO-6
Observation data Epoch J2000 Equinox J2000
- Constellation: Camelopardalis
- Right ascension: 06^{h} 19^{m} 10.3709^{s}
- Declination: +73° 49′ 39.587″
- Apparent magnitude (V): 10.247±0.004

Characteristics
- Evolutionary stage: Main sequence
- Spectral type: F5
- Variable type: Planetary transit variable

Astrometry
Radial velocity (R_{v})	2.5±0.9 km/s
Proper motion (μ)	RA: −16.628 mas/yr Dec.: −22.275 mas/yr
Parallax (π)	4.3131±0.0232 mas
Distance	756 ± 4 ly (232 ± 1 pc)

Details
Mass	1.297±0.040 M_{☉}
Radius	1.417±0.029 R_{☉}
Luminosity	3.36 L_{☉}
Surface gravity (log g)	4.291±0.091 cgs
Temperature	6,724±164 K
Age	1.89±0.46 Gyr

Other designations
- BD+73°323, TOI-1651, TIC 138168780

Database references
SIMBAD	data

XO-6b orbits XO-6, a faint, 10th-magnitude star in the constellation Camelopardalis. Due to its magnitude, this star is too faint to be seen with the naked eye, but can be seen with a telescope. XO-6 is a F-type main-sequence star with about 1.3 times the mass of the Sun. It is also radiating three times as bright, and is 1.4 times the size of the Sun. It is also hotter, with a temperature of 6,724 K, which gives it the typical hue of an F-type star. Unlike most other stars of its kind, XO-6 rotates rapidly at a rate of 43 km/s.
