= ROXs 42Bb =

Circumbinary planetary-mass object orbiting ROXs 42B

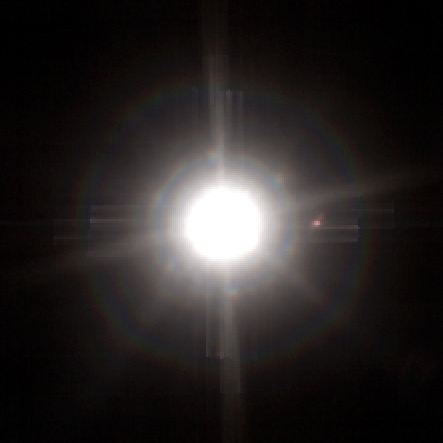
- ROXs 42B and its companion (small red object on the right) with VLT MUSE

Discovery
- Discovered by: Kraus et al. & Currie et al.
- Discovery site: Keck Telescope, Very Large Telescope, Subaru Telescope
- Discovery date: November 2013
- Detection method: Direct imaging

Orbital characteristics
- Semi-major axis: 223+150 −69 AU
- Eccentricity: 0.4+0.2 −0.3
- Orbital period (sidereal): 2900+3300 −1200 years
- Inclination: 58°+15° −20°
- Longitude of ascending node: 112°+22° −23°
- Time of periastron: 57069+878 −2434 MJD
- Argument of periastron: 96°+60° −66°
- Star: ROXs 42B

Physical characteristics
- Mean radius: 2.10±0.35 R_{J}
- Mass: 13±5 M_{J}
- Surface gravity: 3.2 - 12.8 g
- Temperature: 2240±150 K

ROXs 42Bb is a directly imaged planetary-mass companion to the binary M star ROXs 42B, a likely member of the Rho Ophiuchi cloud complex. The companion was independently discovered in December 2013, by astronomers from University of Texas at Austin & University of Toronto.

The object has a best estimated mass around 9 to 10 Jupiter masses, depending on the age of the star, similar to the masses of directly imaged planets around HR 8799 and beta Pictoris. However, it is unclear whether ROXs 42Bb formed like these planets via core accretion, by disk (gravitational) instability, or more like a binary star. Preliminary fits of the spectra and broadband photometry to atmospheric models imply a radius of 2.43 ± 0.18 R_{J} for an effective temperature of about 2,000 K or a radius of 2.55 ± 0.20 R_{J} for about 1950 K. Like Beta Pictoris b, ROXs 42Bb's atmosphere is likely very cloudy and dusty.

The object is located in the constellation Ophiuchus, near the border with Scorpius.

== See also ==
- List of largest exoplanets
