= Kepler-13 =

Triple star system in the constellation Lyra

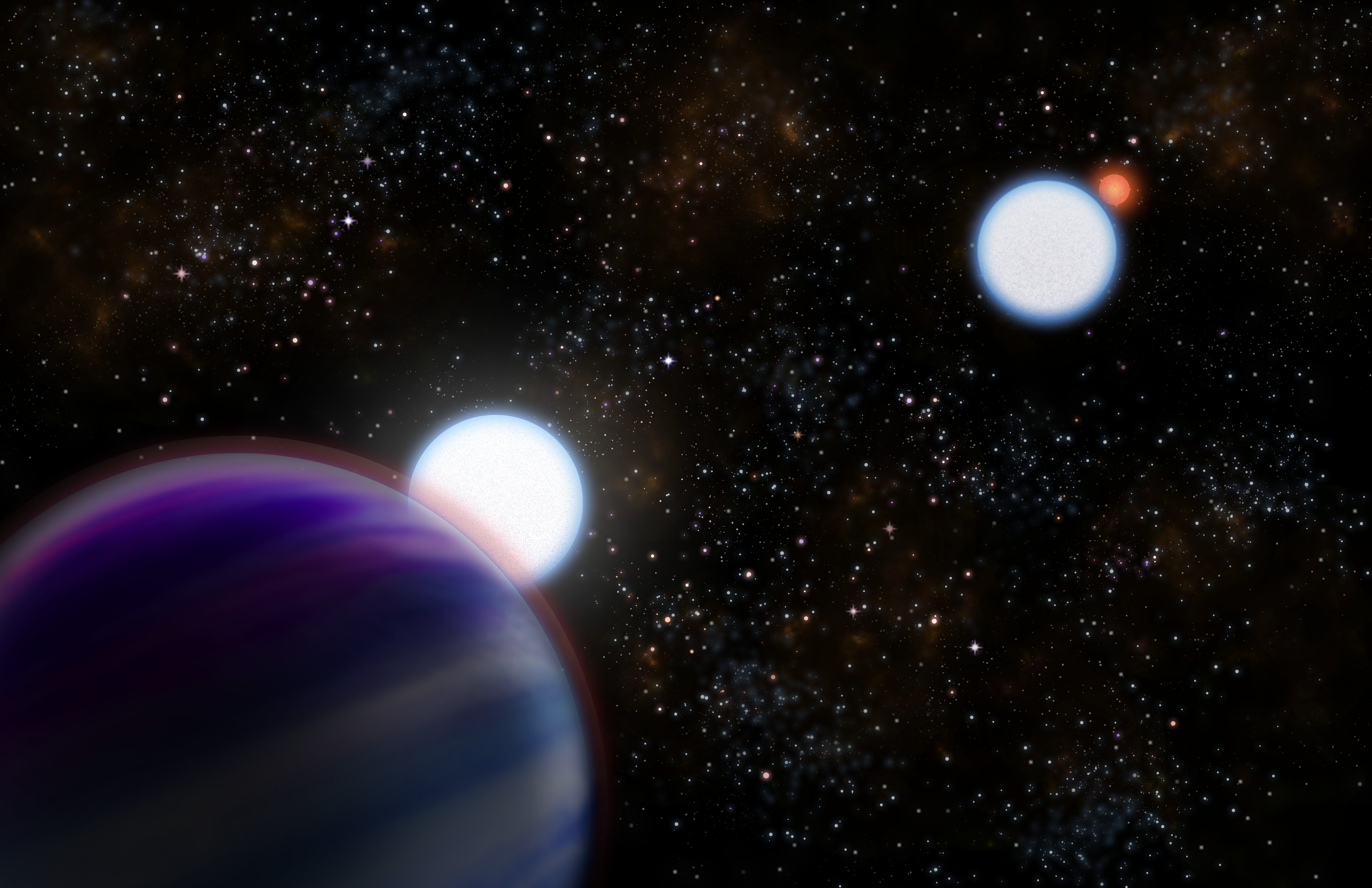
- Artist's conception of the Kepler-13 system

Observation data Epoch J2000 Equinox ICRS
- Constellation: Lyra
- Kepler-13 A
- Right ascension: 19^{h} 07^{m} 53.1397^{s}
- Declination: +46° 52′ 05.922″
- Apparent magnitude (V): 9.95
- Kepler-13 B
- Right ascension: 19^{h} 07^{m} 53.0281^{s}
- Declination: +46° 52′ 06.126″
- Apparent magnitude (V): 10.33

Characteristics
- Spectral type: A0V + A + G
- Variable type: Planetary transit variable

Astrometry

Kepler-13 A
Proper motion (μ)	RA: −4.411(42) mas/yr Dec.: −15.220(50) mas/yr
Parallax (π)	2.0319±0.0344 mas
Distance	1,610 ± 30 ly (492 ± 8 pc)

Kepler-13 B
Proper motion (μ)	RA: −4.060(33) mas/yr Dec.: −15.512(40) mas/yr
Parallax (π)	2.0912±0.0263 mas
Distance	1,560 ± 20 ly (478 ± 6 pc)

Orbit
Primary	Kepler-13A
Name	Kepler-13B
Period (P)	6200+8300 −2700 yr
Semi-major axis (a)	560+430 −180 AU
Eccentricity (e)	0.55+0.33 −0.44
Inclination (i)	107+19 −6°
Longitude of the node (Ω)	113+23 −13°
Periastron epoch (T)	4000+5300 −1000
Argument of periastron (ω) (secondary)	145+33 −23°

Details

Kepler-13A
Mass	1.72±0.10 M_{☉}
Radius	1.71±0.04 R_{☉}
Surface gravity (log g)	4.2±0.5 cgs
Temperature	7650±250 K
Metallicity [Fe/H]	0.2±0.2 dex
Rotational velocity (v sin i)	78±15 km/s
Age	0.5±0.1 Gyr

Kepler-13B
Mass	1.68±0.10 M_{☉}
Radius	1.68±0.04 R_{☉}
Surface gravity (log g)	4.2±0.5 cgs
Temperature	7530±250 K
Metallicity [Fe/H]	0.2±0.2 dex
Rotational velocity (v sin i)	69±13 km/s
Age	0.5±0.1 Gyr

Other designations
- BD+46 2629, ADS 12085 AB, WDS J19079+4652AB, KOI-13, KIC 9941662, 2MASS J19075308+4652061

Database references
SIMBAD	data

Kepler-13 or KOI-13 is a triple star system consisting of Kepler-13A, around which an orbiting hot Jupiter exoplanet was discovered with the Kepler space telescope in 2011, and Kepler-13B a common proper motion companion star which has an additional star orbiting it.

== Stellar system ==
The multiple nature of the system was discovered in 1904 by Robert Grant Aitken at Lick Observatory. He measured a separation between the A and B components of approximately one arc second and position angle of 281.3° with the 36" James Lick telescope. The position of the two visual components of the system relative to each other has remained constant since 1904. Radial velocity measurements taken with the SOPHIE échelle spectrograph at the Haute-Provence Observatory revealed an additional companion orbiting Kepler-13B. This companion has a mass of between 0.4 and 1 times that of the Sun and orbits with a period of 65.831 days with an eccentricity of 0.52

In 2024 a very rough orbit, of the BC pair around A, was determined using astrometric data obtained with the adaptive optics system of the Keck-II telescope. This orbit has a period of between 3,500 and 14,500 years.

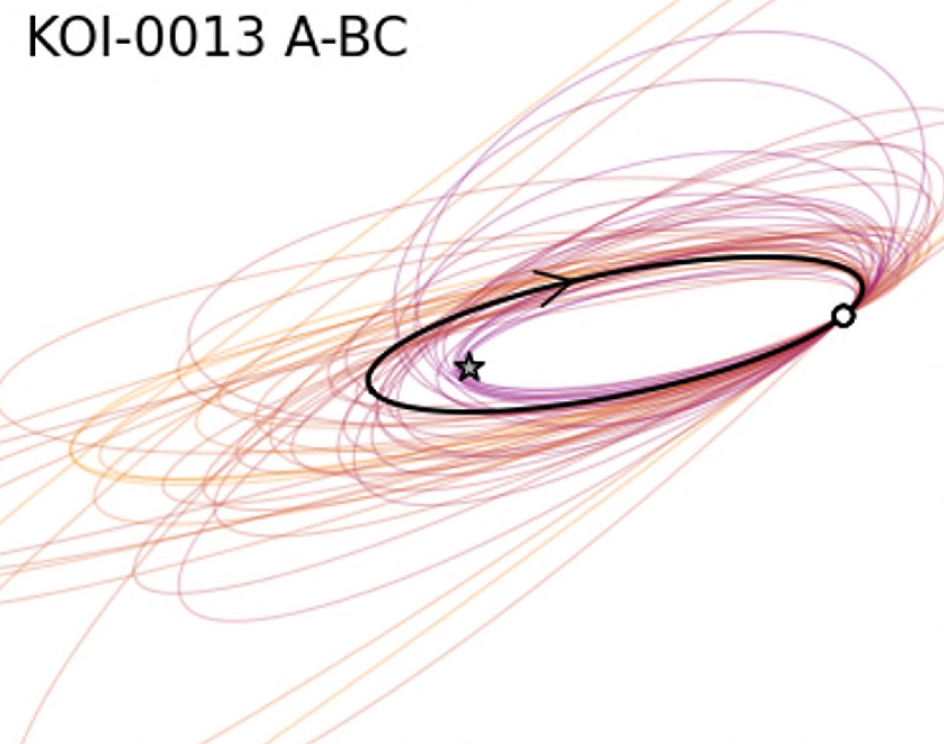
50 random orbits for the visual components of the Kepler 13 (KOI 13) star system. Positions of the unresolved binary companion Kepler 13 BC, relative to the primary Kepler 13 A (shown with a black star) are marked with white circles.

== Planetary system ==
Kepler-13 was identified as one of 1235 planetary candidates with transit-like signatures in the first four months of Kepler data. It was confirmed as a planet by measuring the Doppler beaming effect on the Kepler light curve. The planet that has been confirmed, having a radius of between 1.5 and 2.6 R_{J}, is also one of the largest known exoplanets.

The planet is likely to be tidally locked to the parent star. In 2015, the planetary nightside temperature was estimated to be equal to 2394±251 K.

The study in 2012, utilizing a Rossiter–McLaughlin effect, have determined the planetary orbit is mildly misaligned with the equatorial plane of the star, misalignment equal to 24±4°.

The planetary transits are changing in duration over time which is likely caused by the interaction of the planet with its host star.

In 2017, Hubble observations by a team of astronomers led by Thomas Beatty revealed that titanium monoxide molecules in the dayside might be carried to the nightside of the planet, where they form clouds and precipitate.

The Kepler-13 planetary system
Companion (in order from star)	Mass	Semimajor axis (AU)	Orbital period (days)	Eccentricity	Inclination (°)	Radius
b	9.28±0.16 M_{J}	0.03641±0.00087	1.763588±0.000001	0.00064+0.00012 −0.00016	86.770+0.048 −0.052	1.512±0.035 R_{J}
