= ROXs 12 =

Binary system of pre-main-sequence stars

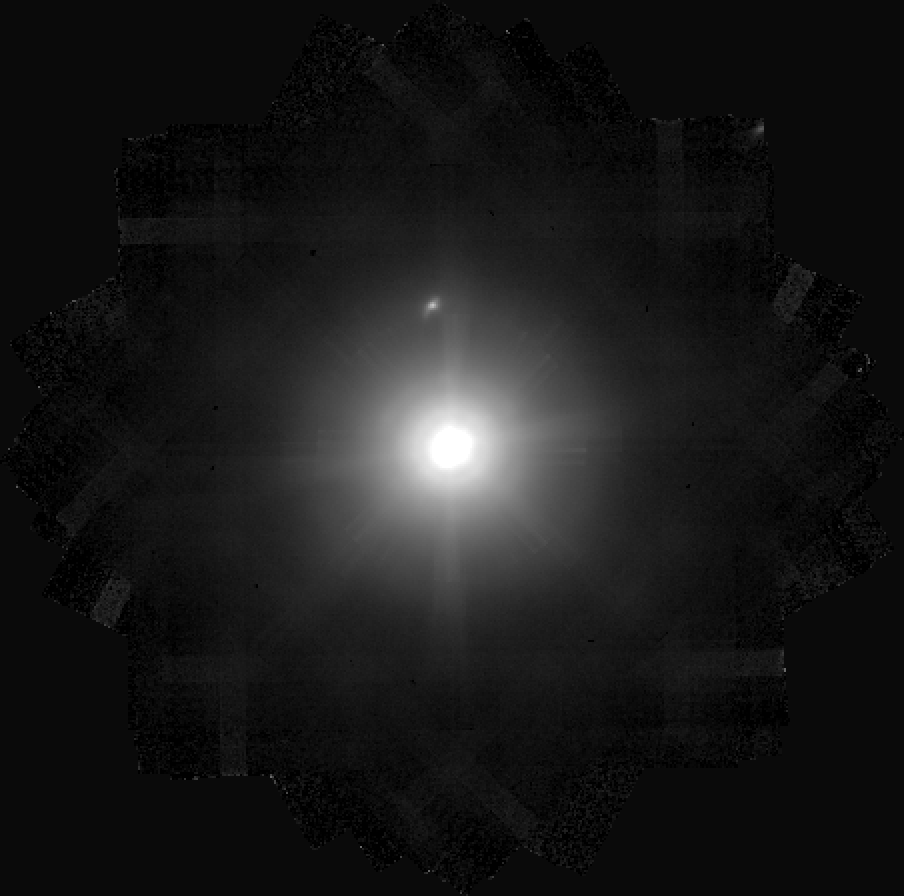
- ROXs 12 (bright star at the center) and ROX 12b (object at the top); Credit: ESO VLT MUSE; Claudio Caceres et al. & Meli_thev

Observation data Epoch J2000 Equinox J2000
- Constellation: Scorpius
- Right ascension: 16^{h} 26^{m} 28.0400^{s}
- Declination: −25° 26′ 47.717″
- Apparent magnitude (V): 14.29

Characteristics
- Evolutionary stage: pre-main-sequence
- Spectral type: M0.0e

Astrometry
Radial velocity (R_{v})	−9.0±5.4 km/s
Proper motion (μ)	RA: −6.858 mas/yr Dec.: −24.815 mas/yr
Parallax (π)	7.2170±0.0172 mas
Distance	452 ± 1 ly (138.6 ± 0.3 pc)

Details

ROXs 12
Mass	0.65^{+0.05}_{−0.09} M_{☉}
Radius	1.14±0.07 R_{☉}
Surface gravity (log g)	4.45±0.04 cgs
Temperature	3900±100 K
Metallicity [Fe/H]	−0.06+0.02 −0.03 dex
Rotation	9.1±0.4 d
Rotational velocity (v sin i)	8.37±0.05 km/s
Age	7.6^{+4.1}_{−2.5} Myr

Other designations
- WDS J16265-2527A, 2MASS J16262803-2526477, DENIS J162628.0-252647

Database references
SIMBAD	ROXs 12
- ROXs 12b

ROXs 12 is a member of a binary system of pre-main-sequence stars. It belongs to the Rho Ophiuchi cloud complex. The surface temperature of the primary star is 3900±100 K. ROXs 12 is much younger than the Sun with an age of 7.6^{+4.1}_{−2.5} million years.

A multiplicity survey detected a stellar companion to ROXs 12 in 2017, named 2MASS J16262774–2527247, at a projected separation of 5100 AU. 2MASS J16262774–2527247 is also a pre-main-sequece star with a mass of 0.8 M_{☉}.

== Planetary system ==
In 2005, one planet was discovered on a wide orbit by direct imaging, was confirmed in 2013 and named ROXs 12 b. The planet's measured temperature is 3100+400
−500 K. The spectroscopy of the planet was obtained with Keck and Gemini, revealing a low surface gravity and a spectral type of L0±2, making this object either a late M-dwarf or an early L-dwarf. The signs of low gravity includes weak alkali absorption and a triangular H-band spectrum shape. The study also found misalignment between the line-of-sight inclinations of ROXs 12A and 2MASS J16262774–2527247. ROXs 12 B is also likely misaligned with its host star. This was interpreted as either formation similar to fragmenting binary stars or ROXs 12B formed in an equatorial disk that was torqued by 2MASS J16262774–2527247. This study also found strong signs of accretion around 2MASS J16262774–2527247 from emission lines, including strong H-alpha emission.

The primary star is surrounded by a protoplanetary disk, although it is not very massive, being less than 4 M_{J}. The secondary star also has a protoplanetary disk, and it is much more massive, equal to 10^{−1.07^{+0.49}_{−0.87}} M_{☉}. The disk is inclined to the equatorial plane of the star.

The ROXs 12 planetary system
Companion (in order from star)	Mass	Semimajor axis (AU)	Orbital period (days)	Eccentricity	Inclination (°)	Radius
b	17.5±1.5 M_{J}	240	—	—	—	2.20±0.35 R_{J}

The 2MASS J16262774–2527247 planetary system
Companion (in order from star)	Mass	Semimajor axis (AU)	Orbital period (days)	Eccentricity	Inclination (°)	Radius
Protoplanetary disk	4.1–25.8 AU				—	—
