= HIP 79098 =

Star

- Location of HIP 79098 (circled)

Observation data Epoch J2000.0 Equinox ICRS
- Constellation: Scorpius
- Right ascension: 16^{h} 08^{m} 43.72^{s}
- Declination: −23° 41′ 07.5″
- Apparent magnitude (V): 5.87 to 5.90

Characteristics
- Evolutionary stage: main sequence
- Spectral type: B9V; B9 Mn P Ga; B9 IVn + Ap(Si)s
- U−B color index: +0.02
- B−V color index: −0.31
- Variable type: α^{2} CVn

Astrometry
| Radial velocity (R_{v}) | −16.0 km/s |
| Proper motion (μ) | RA: −10.09±0.22 mas/yr Dec.: −26.09±0.18 mas/yr |
| Parallax (π) | 6.4762±0.1839 mas |
| Distance | 500 ± 10 ly (154 ± 4 pc) |
| Absolute magnitude (M_{V}) | −0.33±0.07 |

Orbit
| Semi-major axis (a) | 1.9±0.6 au |

Details

A
| Mass | 3.46±0.14 M_{☉} 2.5 M_{☉} |
| Radius | 3.2 R_{☉} |
| Luminosity | 190±40 L_{☉} |
| Surface gravity (log g) | 3.76 cgs |
| Temperature | 12,430±460 K |
| Metallicity [Fe/H] | +0.033 dex |
| Rotational velocity (v sin i) | 45.0±1.5 km/s |
| Age | 10±3 Myr |

B
| Mass | 0.53±0.26 M_{☉} |

Other designations
- CD−23 12731, HD 144844, HIP 79098, HR 6003, SAO 184164

Database references
| SIMBAD | data |

HIP 79098 is a binary star in the constellation Scorpius. It has a visual apparent magnitude of about +5.9, being visible to the naked eye under very dark skies. From parallax measurements by the Gaia spacecraft, it is located approximately 500 light-years (154 parsecs) from Earth.

This system consists of a chemically peculiar B-type star, plus a spectroscopic companion of unknown type. Two additional distant red dwarfs may be part of the system, at separations of 9,500 and 12,900 AU. In 2019, a brown dwarf was discovered orbiting the central binary at a distance of about 350 AU.

== Star system ==
This is a young stellar system, belonging to the Upper Scorpius subgroup of the Scorpius–Centaurus association, the nearest OB association to the Sun. This is an association of stars with common origin and movement. The Upper Scorpius subgroup is the youngest of the association and has an estimated age of around 10 million years, which is therefore the age of HIP 79098.

HIP 79098 has a spectral type of B9V, indicating that the primary star is a B-type main sequence star. The system's spectrum is complex and has also been classified as B9 Mn P Ga, and B9IVn+Ap(Si)s. The primary is a chemically peculiar star of the type HgMn (mercury-manganese star), and has strong manganese and gallium lines, and weak helium lines. It is also a variable star, oscillating between magnitudes 5.87 and 5.90 with a period of 2.69 days, being classified as a α^{2} Canum Venaticorum variable. A secondary period of 0.28 days has also been detected. These variability cycles can be caused by the rotation of the star or by pulsations. The mass of the primary star is estimated at 2.5 times the solar mass.

The system's spectrum has the lines of a second star, which means HIP 79098 is a double-lined spectroscopic binary. While its exact nature is unknown, the secondary star is probably quite massive, possibly almost as massive as the primary. The primary's radial velocity seems to have large variations caused by the orbit of the stars, but different studies give contradictory results regarding the size of these variations, so it is not possible to determine the basic parameters of the system like masses and orbit. The presence of the second star is also seen in the astrometic data by the Hipparcos and Gaia spacecraft, which show a large anomaly from the constant proper motion hypothesis. One 2023 study of the radial velocity and astrometric data found a semi-major axis of 1.9±0.6 au and a companion mass of 0.53±0.26 M_{☉}.

There are two other stars close to HIP 79098 in the sky which have proper motion and distances similar to those of HIP 79098, and therefore can be physical companions. They are both low-mass red dwarfs and are also confirmed members of the Scorpius–Centaurus association. The first star has a spectral type of M5 and is separated from HIP 79098 by 65 arcseconds, or 9,500 AU. The second star is brighter and has a spectral type of M3.25, and is separated by 88 arcseconds, or 12,900 AU.

== Brown dwarf ==
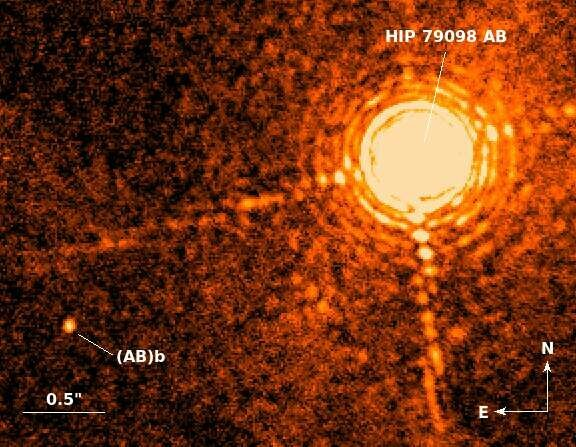
K 1 image of HIP 79098 AB and its faint companion HIP 79098 (AB)b from SPHERE.

The discovery of a brown dwarf orbiting HIP 79098 was published in 2019 as part of the BEAST survey, which searches for planets around B-type stars in the Scorpius–Centaurus association. This object was identified in archival images from 2000 by the ESO 3.6 m Telescope, from 2004 by NACO instrument at the Very Large Telescope, and from 2015 by the SPHERE instrument at the Very Large Telescope. Previous studies had seen the object, but considered it too red to be part of the HIP 79098 system, so it was rejected as a likely background star. The 2019 study combined all the observations of the object and showed that it has a common proper motion with HIP 79098, confirming that it is physically linked to the system.

Named HIP 79098 (AB)b, the brown dwarf is circumbinary and was observed at a separation of 2.4 arcseconds from the central binary, or 345±6 AU. Its color is redder than expected for an object of its luminosity, which is expected given the young age of the system and explains why HIP 79098 (AB)b was not found in the earlier studies. Its color and luminosity are consistent with a spectral type of M9–L0, its mass is 15–26 times the mass of Jupiter, and effective temperature 2,300 to 2,600 K.

The mass ratio between HIP 79098 (AB)b and the central binary is estimated at 0.3–1%. This is a low value similar to some systems with massive planets, which can suggest that HIP 79098 (AB)b represents the upper end of the planet population, as opposed to having been formed as a star.

The HIP 79098 AB planetary system
| Companion (in order from star) | Mass | Semimajor axis (AU) | Orbital period (days) | Eccentricity | Inclination (°) | Radius |
|---|---|---|---|---|---|---|
| b | 28±13 M_{J} | 345±6 | — | — | — | 2.6 ± 0.6 R_{J} |
