= CFHTWIR-Oph 98 b =

Substellar object in a binary system

CFHTWIR-Oph 98 B
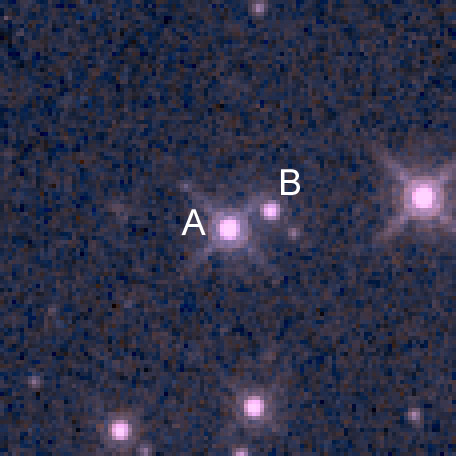
- Hubble image of Oph 98 AB

Discovery
- Discovered by: Fontanive et al.
- Discovery date: 2020
- Detection method: Direct imaging

Orbital characteristics
- Semi-major axis: 200±6 AU (mean separation)
- Star: CFHTWIR-Oph 98 A

Physical characteristics (Note: for age of 3 Myr)
- Mean radius: 1.86±0.05 R_{J}
- Mass: 7.8+0.7 −0.8 M_{J}
- Temperature: 1800±40 K
- Spectral type: L2-L6

CFHTWIR-Oph 98 B is a planetary-mass companion that orbits CFHTWIR-Oph 98 A, a M-type brown dwarf. The pair form a binary system. The primary is a M9–L1 dwarf and the secondary is an L dwarf with a spectral type of L2–L6. Both spectral types are estimated from photometry. The pair is separated by 200 astronomical units and has a low gravitational binding energy. The primary Oph 98A has a spectrum taken in 2012 with VLT/ISAAC, matching a spectral type of M9.75 and from Spitzer photometry and near-infrared photometry it is surrounded by a class II disk. This disk has a mass of 0.135 M_{J} according to a study using SED-modelling.

== Formation ==
It orbits a star but its formation as an exoplanet is challenging or impossible. If its formation scenario is known, it may explain the formation of Planet Nine. Planetary migration may explain its formation, or it may be a brown dwarf.

== See also ==
- List of exoplanets discovered in 2020
- Brown dwarf
- 2MASS J11193254–1137466 AB
