= 2MASS J05352184−0546085 =

Eclipsing binary brown dwarf in the Orion Nebula

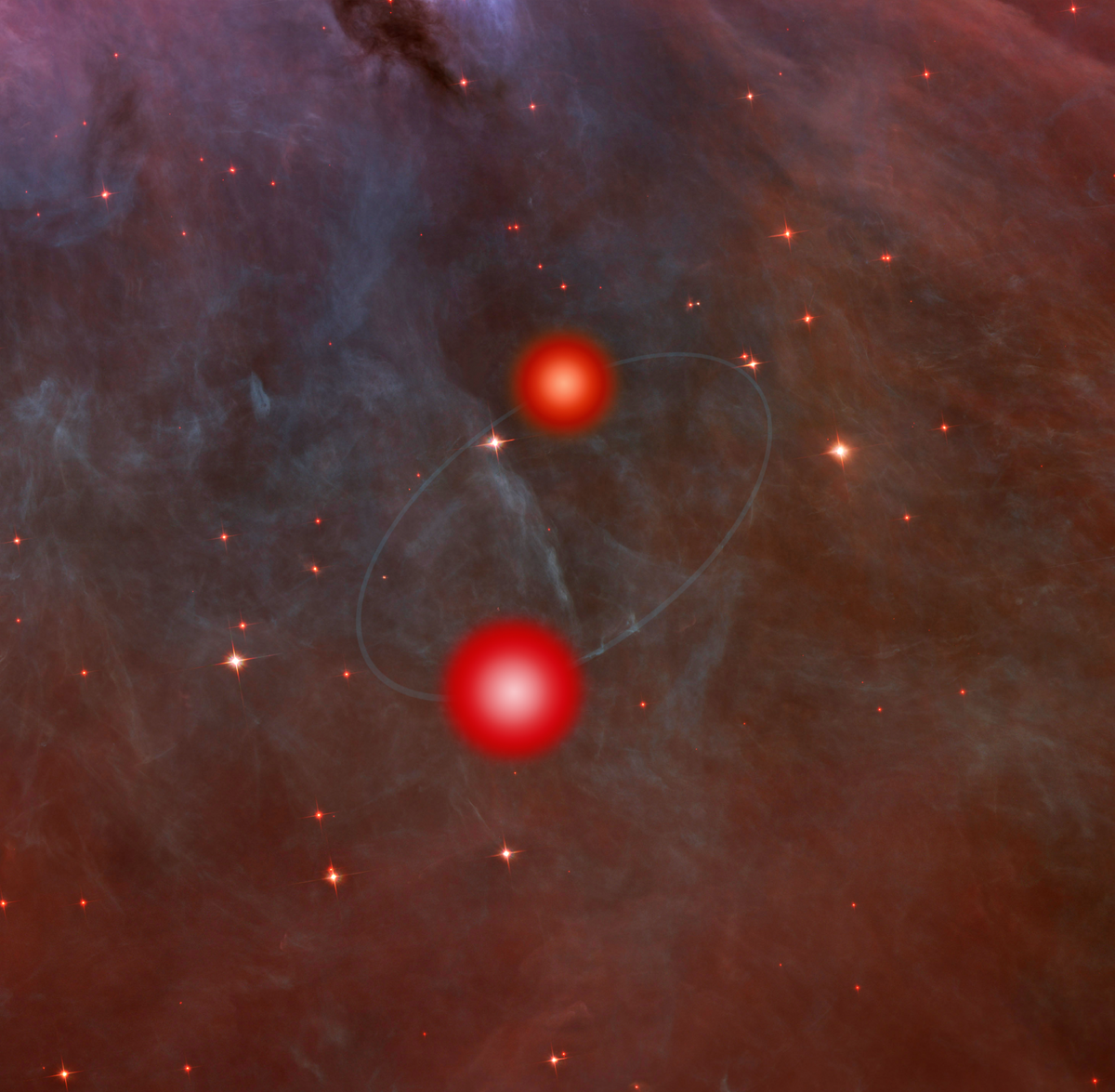
- Artist's impression of the 2M0535-05 system

Observation data Epoch J2000 Equinox ICRS
- Constellation: Orion
- Right ascension: 05^{h} 35^{m} 21.84732^{s}
- Declination: −05° 46′ 08.5714″

Characteristics
- Evolutionary stage: brown dwarf
- Spectral type: M6.5±0.5
- Apparent magnitude (J): 14.65±0.03
- Apparent magnitude (H): 13.90±0.04
- Apparent magnitude (K): 13.47±0.03
- Variable type: eclipsing binary

Astrometry
Proper motion (μ)	RA: 1.960 mas/yr Dec.: −0.049 mas/yr
Parallax (π)	2.6730±0.2658 mas
Distance	1,200 ± 100 ly (370 ± 40 pc)

Orbit
Period (P)	9.779556(19) d
Semi-major axis (a)	0.0407±0.0008 AU
Eccentricity (e)	0.3216±0.0019
Inclination (i)	88.49±0.06°
Argument of periastron (ω) (secondary)	215.3±0.5°
Semi-amplitude (K_{1}) (primary)	18.61±0.55 km/s
Semi-amplitude (K_{2}) (secondary)	29.14±1.40 km/s

Details

A
Mass	0.0572±0.0033 M_{☉}
Radius	0.690±0.011 R_{☉}
Surface gravity (log g)	3.52±0.03 cgs
Temperature	2715±200 K
Rotation	3.293±0.001 d
Rotational velocity (v sin i)	10 km/s
Age	~1 Myr

B
Mass	0.0366±0.0022 M_{☉}
Radius	0.540±0.009 R_{☉}
Surface gravity (log g)	3.54±0.03 cgs
Temperature	~2850 (Note: Derived from the primary temperature of 2715 K and the secondary/primary temperature ratio of 1.050) K
Rotation	14.05±0.05 d
Rotational velocity (v sin i)	<5 km/s
Age	~1 Myr

Other designations
- V2384 Ori, 2MASS J05352184-0546085

Database references
SIMBAD	data

2MASS J05352184-0546085, abbreviated to 2M0535-05 and also known by its variable star designation V2384 Orionis, is a young eclipsing binary brown dwarf system in the Orion Nebula, about 1,200 light-years (370 parsecs) away. It was discovered in 2006 and was the first eclipsing brown dwarf system to be discovered, predating the discovery of the transiting brown dwarf CoRoT-3b in 2008.

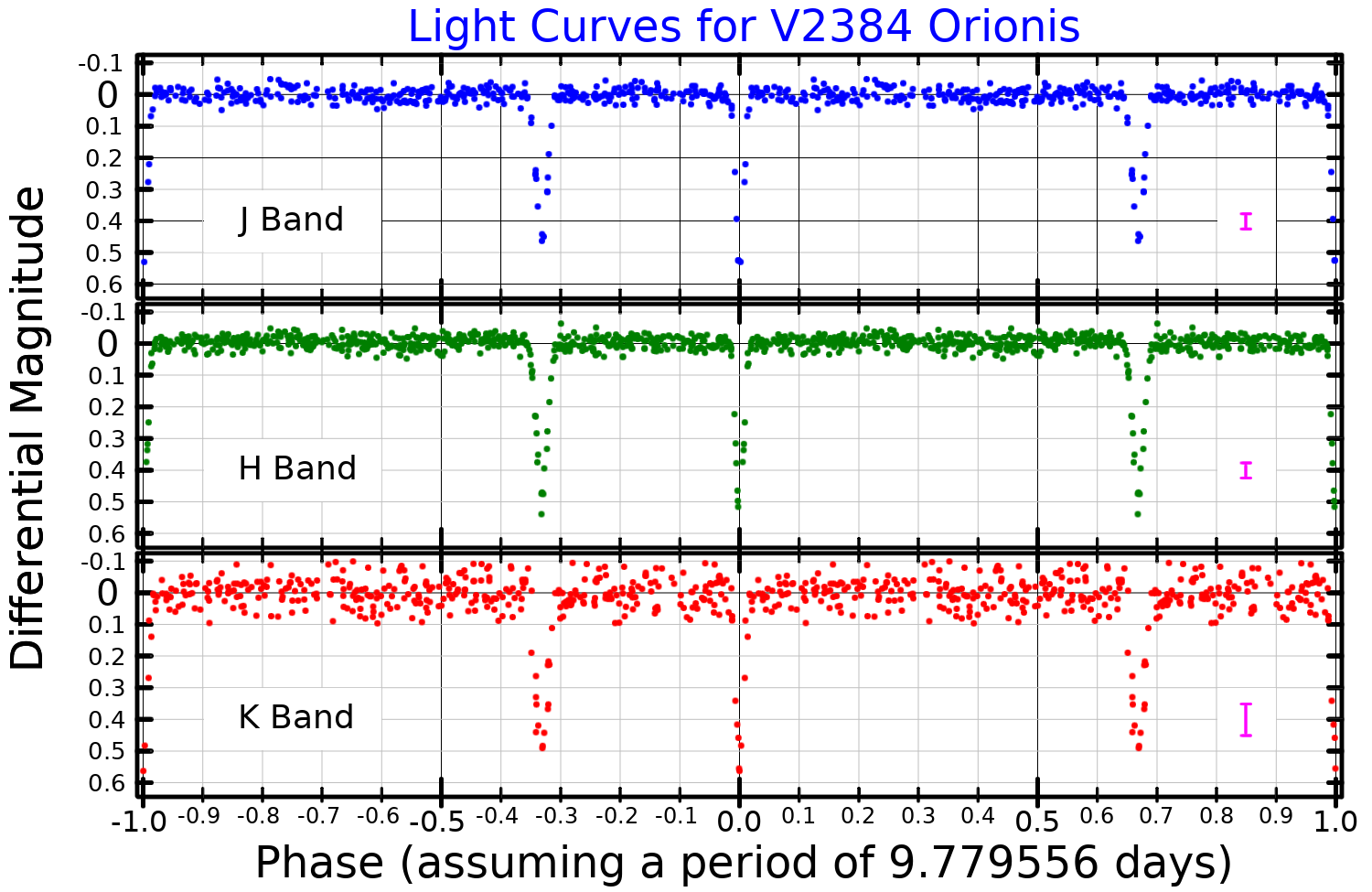
Light curves for V2384 Orionis in three infrared bands. Representative error bars are shown in violet. Plotted from data published by Gómez Maqueo Chew et al. (2009)

The pair orbit each other with a period of 9.8 days, and are about 60 and 38 times the mass of Jupiter, respectively. The system is very young, at an age of about 1 million years, so the brown dwarfs have yet to cool; they are M-type objects with temperatures comparable to red dwarf stars, and they are inflated in size to over half the radius of the Sun. The primary is observed to rotate with a period of 3.3 days and the secondary 14 days, indicating that they have not yet become tidally locked to each other.

Unexpectedly, the less massive (secondary) brown dwarf is the hotter of the pair. Possible explanations for this temperature reversal include the two brown dwarfs differing slightly in age; strong magnetic fields on the primary inhibiting convection, supported by the primary's observed fast rotation and strong hydrogen-alpha emission; large starspots on the primary, though this was found to be unsupported by evidence; and tidal heating, which is unlikely to be solely responsible for the temperature reversal.

No infrared excess that would indicate the presence of a circumstellar disk has been detected in this system. The system is a source of X-ray emission.

== See also ==
- 2M1510, another eclipsing binary brown dwarf
