= WASP-78 =

Star in the constellation Eridanus

Observation data Epoch J2000 Equinox ICRS
- Constellation: Eridanus
- Right ascension: 04^{h} 15^{m} 01.5043^{s}
- Declination: −22° 06′ 59.103″
- Apparent magnitude (V): 12.0

Characteristics
- Evolutionary stage: main sequence
- Spectral type: F8

Astrometry
Radial velocity (R_{v})	1.26 km/s
Proper motion (μ)	RA: −0.367(11) mas/yr Dec.: 6.395(13) mas/yr
Parallax (π)	1.3851±0.0136 mas
Distance	2,350 ± 20 ly (722 ± 7 pc)

Details
Mass	1.33±0.09 M_{☉}
Radius	2.20±0.12 R_{☉}
Luminosity	5.2±0.1 L_{☉}
Surface gravity (log g)	3.88±0.04 cgs
Temperature	6,100±150 K
Metallicity [Fe/H]	−0.35±0.14 dex
Rotation	0.4±0.4
Rotational velocity (v sin i)	6.63±0.16 km/s
Age	3.4^{+1.5}_{−0.8} Gyr

Other designations
- TYC 5889-271-1, GSC 05889-00271, 2MASS J04150149-2206591, Gaia DR3 5089851638095503616

Database references
SIMBAD	data

WASP-78, is a single F-type main-sequence star about 2350 light-years away. It is likely to be younger than the Sun at 3.4^{+1.5}_{−0.8} billion years. WASP-78 is depleted in heavy elements, having a 45% concentration of iron compared to the Sun.

== Planetary system ==
In 2012 a transiting hot Jupiter planet b was detected on a circular orbit. The planetary equilibrium temperature is 2350±80 K, while the nightside temperature measured in 2019 is 2200±41 K. The dayside planetary temperature measured in 2020 is 2,560±130 K.

A survey in 2016 measured a Rossiter-McLaughlin effect and found the planetary orbit is well aligned with the equatorial plane of the star, misalignment equal to −6.4±5.9° The planet cannot have formed in its current orbit and has likely undergone in the past a migration from the initial highly eccentric orbit.

The WASP-78 planetary system
Companion (in order from star)	Mass	Semimajor axis (AU)	Orbital period (days)	Eccentricity	Inclination (°)	Radius
b	0.89±0.08 M_{J}	0.0362±0.0008	2.17517632±0.0000047	0	83.2^{+2.3}_{−1.6}	1.70±0.11 R_{J}
