= List of exoplanet extremes =

The following are lists of extremes among the known exoplanets. The properties listed here are those for which values are known reliably. The study of exoplanets is one of the most dynamic emerging fields of science, thus these values may change as new discoveries are made.

== Extremes from Earth's viewpoint ==
Title	Planet(s)	Star	Data	Notes
Most distant discovered	SWEEPS-11 / SWEEPS-04	SWEEPS J175902.67−291153.5 / SWEEPS J175853.92−291120.6	27700 light-years	Assuming the largest distance from the microlensing light-curve, the planet OGLE-2017-BLG-0364Lb might be more distant, at around 32600 light-years (10000 pc). PSR J0738-4042 at 37000 light-years was shown to be affected by a disk of asteroids, but no planets have been detected yet. The most distant potentially habitable planet confirmed is Kepler-1606b, at 2870 light-years distant, although the unconfirmed planet KOI-5889.01 is over 5000 light-years distant. On 31 March 2022, K2-2016-BLG-0005Lb was reported to be the most distant exoplanet discovered by the Kepler telescope, at 16960 light-years away. Among rogue planets, the furthest are very likely extragalactic planets within the lensing system SDSS J1004+4112 at 6.3 billion light-years. Another extragalactic candidate planet M51-ULS-1 b was discovered in M51-ULS-1 system with strong evidence, located in Whirlpool Galaxy some 28 million light years away. Because M51-ULS-1 b is orbiting a potential black hole, it may be also classified as a blanet.
Least distant	Proxima Centauri b Proxima Centauri d	Proxima Centauri	4.25 light-years	Proxima Centauri b is the closest potentially habitable exoplanet known. As Proxima Centauri is the closest star to the Sun (and will stay so for the next 25000 years), this is an absolute record, unless a closer brown dwarf/compact object with a planet is discovered. In about 25 000 years, Alpha Centauri AB will be closer to the Sun than its companion Proxima Centauri. If Rigil Kentaurus b is confirmed around Rigil Kentaurus (Alpha Centauri A), that planet would replace Proxima planets as nearest planet to the Sun assuming no closer brown dwarf/compact object with a planet being discovered. If no closer brown dwarf/compact object with a planet is found and no planet is found around either Ross 248 or Gliese 445, the least distant record will change in a bit less than 80 000 years from now, making Ross 128 b, a "temperate exoplanet in the inner edge of the habitable zone" the least distant one.
Most distant directly visible	CT Chamaeleontis b	CT Chamaeleontis	622 light-years	The resolved likely close to equal mass binary brown dwarf NIRISS-NGC1333-10 AB, the mass of NIRISS-NGC1333-10 B is slightly higher than the deuterium burning limit, is more distant at 978 light-years. The disputed planet CVSO 30 c may be more distant, at 1165 light-years away. The candidate planet AT Pyxidis b may also be more distant, at ~1207 light-years away. Among rogue planets, o005 s41280 is the most distant at 17300 light-years; followed by A2744-BD-1 and o006 s00089, at 15520 and 6520 light-years away, respectively. As free-floating objects, all of them might not be considered as planets, although their masses might be below 13 M_{J}.
Closest directly visible	Epsilon Indi Ab	Epsilon Indi	12.05 light-years	COCONUTS-2b at 35.5 light-years is the next closest directly visible. WISE 0855-0714 is closer, at about 7.4 light-years away. As a free-floating object, it might not be considered as planet, although its mass is below 13 M_{J}. The candidate planet Alpha Centauri Ab is also closer (4.34 light-years) and might have been directly imaged.
Closest hot Jupiter type exoplanet to Earth	Saffar	Upsilon Andromedae A	44.0±0.1 ly	
Closest super-Jupiter type exoplanet to Earth	Epsilon Indi Ab	Epsilon Indi	11.867±0.004 ly	
Closest super-Earth type exoplanet to Earth	Proxima Centauri b	Proxima Centauri	4.2465±0.0003 ly	
Star with the brightest apparent magnitude (in visible) with a planet	Alpha Arietis b	Hamal (Note: Algieba is mentioned to have a slightly higher magnitude (1.99); however it is the combined magnitude of the system and not of the planet-hosting star, which is 2.37.)	Apparent magnitude is 2.005	Alpha Centauri A (apparent magnitude 0.01) has a directly imaged candidate planet. The evidence of planets around Vega with an apparent magnitude of 0.03 is strongly suggested by circumstellar disks surrounding it. As of 2021, a candidate planet around Vega has been detected. Aldebaran (apparent magnitude varies between 0.75 and 0.95) was thought to have a candidate planet, however later studies found the existence of the planet dubious. Similarly, Pollux (apparent magnitude = 1.14) and Mirfak (apparent magnitude = 1.806) were claimed to have orbiting planets, all of which have been either questioned or disproved. An Earth-mass planet claimed to orbit Alpha Centauri B (apparent magnitude = 1.33) was subsequently refuted. A 2023 study detected 10 luminous point sources around the primary star of Fomalhaut system (apparent magnitude = 1.16), of which the last source may or may not be a planetary-mass companion. This star was previously thought to harbour a directly imaged planet named Fomalhaut b, before the realization of object as an expanding debris cloud from a planetesimal collision.
Star with the faintest apparent magnitude (in visible) with a planet	MOA-bin-29Lb	MOA-bin-29L	Apparent magnitude is 44.61	
Closest planet to the celestial north pole (i.e. highest declination)	TOI-1691 b	TOI-1691	Declination of +86° 51′ 37.23″	
Closest planet to the celestial south pole (i.e. lowest declination)	HD 110082 b	HD 110082	Declination of −88° 07′ 16″	
Star with the highest apparent motion (i.e. proper motion) with a planet	Barnard planets	Barnard's Star	10.358 arcsec/yr	As Barnard's Star has the highest apparent motion in the sky, this is currently an absolute record.
Largest angular distance separation from its host star	COCONUTS-2b	COCONUTS-2	594 arcseconds	A candidate planet or brown dwarf around BD+29 5007 has an even larger angular separation of about 935 arcseconds.
Smallest resolved angular distance separation from its parent star	Beta Pictoris c	Beta Pictoris	0.138 arcseconds	Derived from its separation of ~2.68 AU and its distance of 63.4 light-years (19.4 parsecs).
Smallest angular distance separation from its parent star	NGC 6440 X-2 b	NGC 6440 X-2	0.31 microarcseconds	Derived from its separation of 0.00255 AU and its distance of ~27070 light-years (8300 parsecs).
Star with the largest apparent size (angular diameter)	Alpha Arietis b	Hamal	7.006±0.027 mas	Accounted for the limb darkening effect. The star Mirach (β Andromedae) has larger angular diameter at 13.749±0.137 mas and has either a brown dwarf or a gas giant companion. Several stars have a larger angular diameter and were claimed to have candidate planets: Aldebaran (20.58±0.03 mas), L2 Puppis (17.9±1.6 mas) and Alpha Centauri A (8.314±0.016 mas).

== Planetary characteristics ==
Title	Planet	Star	Data	Notes
Most massive	The most massive planet is difficult to define due to the blurry line between planets and brown dwarfs. If the borderline is defined as the deuterium fusion threshold (roughly 13 M_{J} at solar metallicity (Note: The deuterium burning limit also depends on the metallicity and abundance of helium. Metal-rich planets, for example, need a lower mass to fuse deuterium.)), the most massive planets are those with true mass closest to that cutoff; if planets and brown dwarfs are differentiated based on formation, their mass ranges overlap. A candidate for the most massive object that formed in a protoplanetary disk is CWW 89Ab, at about 36 M_{J}. This object is massive enough to have fused deuterium early in its life, but its atmosphere indicates it may have formed via the very high-mass end of the planet formation process.			
Most massive in proportion to the mass of the star(s) it revolves around	Delorme 1 b	Delorme 1	Mass ratio is ~0.034	2M1207 b has a larger ratio to 2M1207 of ~0.2, but the host is a brown dwarf. 2M1207 b also may be a sub-brown dwarf instead of a planetary-mass companion. The planet candidate NSV 1440 b has a higher mass ratio at 0.045 ± 0.002 to its host star, which is a white dwarf. However, with a mass near 30 M_{J}, it is likely a companion star that was stripped down to a substellar-mass object.
Most massive in proportion to the mass of the host object it revolves around	CFHTWIR-Oph 98 b	CFHTWIR-Oph 98 A	Mass ratio is ~0.51 (Note: 7.8 M_{Jup}/15.4 M_{Jup} = 0.51)	Both, this object and (DRS2009) 1996 with a mass ratio of ~0.35 (Note: 5.32 M_{Jup}/15.2 M_{Jup} = 0.35) may be sub-brown dwarfs instead of a planetary companion.
Least massive	Draugr	PSR B1257+12	0.020±0.002 M_{🜨}	The extrasolar planetesimal WD 1145+017 b is less massive, at 0.00067 M_{🜨}. As a reference, the mass of Earth's moon is about 0.012 M_{🜨}.
Largest radius	DH Tauri b	DH Tauri	2.51±0.16 R_{J}	DH Tauri b has the largest radius of 2.51±0.16 R_{J}. While its latest three mass estimates are consistent with a planet, the mass being below the deuterium burning limit still needs full confirmation. HAT-P-67 b is the largest transiting known planet and largest known planet with a precisely measured radius as of 2025, with 2.140±0.025 R_{J}. Proplyd 133-353 is larger at up to 7.4±0.3 – 8.0±1.1 R_{J}. (Note: Based on the estimated temperature and luminosity.) It might be considered as a sub-brown dwarf or a rogue planet, with a photoevaporating disk. If mass of GQ Lupi b is lower than 13 M_{J} (currently ~10 – 40 R_{J}), GQ Lupi b would surpass HAT-P-67 b as the largest planet at a radius of 3.7±0.7 R_{J}. A candidate planet FU Orionis Ab has larger radius of ~9.8 R_{J}.
Smallest radius	Kepler-37b	Kepler-37	0.296±0.037 R_{🜨}	The extrasolar planetesimal WD 1145+017 b is smaller.
Smallest radius with a confirmed atmosphere	TOI-561 b	TOI-561	1.39 R_{🜨}	The planets LHS 1478 b and L 98-59 b are smaller (at 1.17 R_{🜨} and 0.85 R_{🜨}, respectively) and might have atmospheres.
Most distorted terrestrial exoplanet	GJ 4256 b	GJ 4256	The long axis is 1.15 times the short axis	Assuming a Love number $h_2 = 1$ for the planet.
Most dense	GP Comae Berenices b	GP Comae Berenices	≥185 g/cm^{3}	According to the IAU working definition of exoplanets GP Comae Berenices b, being 10 times more massive than Jupiter, is a planet, despite that it might have formed as a white dwarf that was stripped down to a planetary-mass object. For reference, it is a lot denser than osmium at 293 K, the densest naturally occurring stable element on Earth. It is suspected that GP Comae Berenices b might be composed of strange matter based on its density. TOI-4603 b is the densest planet which orbits a normal star and is not a potential brown dwarf, with 14.1+1.7 −1.6 g/cm^{3}.
Least dense	TOI-791 b	TOI-791	0.038±0.008 g/cm^{3}	Could alternatively be Kepler-51d with 0.0381±0.0085 g/cm^{3} Next least dense are the super-puff planets TOI-791 c with 0.047±0.006 g/cm^{3} and WASP-193b with 0.059±0.014 g/cm^{3} A predicted highly evaporating planet was proposed to orbit the star FU Orionis with a density of about 0.0042 g/cm^{3}. (Note: Density calculated from the mass of ~3 M_{J} and the radius of ~9.8 R_{J})
Highest planetary rotation rate	Kappa Andromedae b	Kappa Andromedae	≥38.42±0.05 km/s	
Hottest (irradiated planet)	KELT-9b	KELT-9	4050±180 K (3777 °C)	The candidate planets OGLE-TR-1001b and KOI-2093.03 are hotter, at 4200 K and 6285 K, respectively. A candidate planet was suggested to orbit WD 2226-210, the central star of the Helix Nebula, with an equilibrium temperature of 4970 K. Kepler-70b and Kepler-70c are often described as the hottest known exoplanets, both at >6800 K (assuming an albedo of 0.1 for both), but their existences are highly doubtful.
Hottest (self-luminous)	GQ Lupi b	GQ Lupi	2650±100 K (2377 °C)	GQ Lupi b may be either a massive planet or a brown dwarf.
Coldest	OGLE-2005-BLG-390Lb	OGLE-2005-BLG-390L	50 K (−223.2 °C) (Note: This is the calculated equilibrium temperature, assuming an albedo of 0.3)	The disputed planet Proxima Centauri c may be cooler, at 39 K (−234.2 °C).
Fastest jetstream wind	WASP-127b	WASP-127	33000 km/h (9200 m/s)	
Strongest magnetic field	Beta Pictoris b	Beta Pictoris	≥1250 G	For comparison, the field strength of Jupiter is 4.17 G. The magnetic field of SIMP J013656.5+093347 is stronger at ~3200 G. As a free-floating object, it might not be considered a planet.
Highest albedo	LTT 9779 b	LTT 9779	0.79±0.15	This is value for the western dayside region, with the overall albedo of dayside being 0.50±0.07. Could alternatively be TOI-561 b with albedo 0.74+0.08 −0.10 For comparison, the Bond albedo values of Earth and Venus are 0.3 and 0.76, respectively.
Lowest albedo	TrES-2b	TrES-2A	Geometric albedo < 1%	Best-fit model for albedo gives 0.04% (0.0004).
Youngest	DH Tauri b	DH Tauri	0.7+0.3 −0.2 Myr	Could alternatively be the protoplanet Elias 2-24 b at less than or approximately equal to 1.0 Myr. The free-floating planet or sub-brown dwarf Proplyd 133-353 is younger, at 0.5 Myr. However, as a free-floating planet, it does not meet the IAU's working definition of a planet. 2MASS J04414489+2301513 b is listed as the youngest planet in the NASA Exoplanet Archive, at an age of 1 Myr, but fails the mass ratio criterion of the IAU working definition of an exoplanet; the mass ratio with the primary is larger than the L4/L5 limit of stability ≈ 1/25 and the companion is 'more likely to have been produced by cloud core fragmentation' (which is similar to a star). Two planetary candidates proposed to orbit IRS 63 might be younger at ≲0.5 Myr. IRAS 04125+2902 b is the youngest transiting planet at an age of ~3 Myr. HD 114082b is the youngest radial velocity planet at an age of 15±6 Myr. CI Tauri c would be the youngest radial velocity planet at an age of 2–3 Myr, if confirmed. (Note: Most sources like the NASA Exoplanet Archive and exoplanet.eu already accept it as confirmed.)
Oldest	TOI-157 b	TOI-157	12.82+0.73 −1.40 Gyr	The currently accepted age of the universe is around 13.8 billion years. Could alternatively be PSR B1620-26 b with 11.2–12.7 Gyr. Two disproven planets had been thought to orbit the star HIP 11952, whose age is 12.8±2.6 Gyr. The star HE 1523-0901 might be older at 13.2 Gyr and has a candidate planet or brown dwarf.

== Orbital characteristics ==
Title	Planet	Star	Data	Notes
Longest orbital period (Longest year)	Gliese 900 b (CW2335+0142)	Gliese 900	1.27 million years (Note: Assuming a circular orbit and using Kepler's third law)	COCONUTS-2b previously held this record at 1.1 million years.
Shortest orbital period (Shortest year)	GALEX 0718+3731 b	GALEX 0718+3731	0.187 h (11.2 minutes)	KOI 1843.03 has the shortest orbit around a main-sequence star (an M dwarf) at 4.25 hours.
Largest orbital separation	Gliese 900 b (CW2335+0142)	Gliese 900	12000 AU	UCAC4 328-061594 b has an even larger orbital separation (19000 AU), although its mass (21 M_{J}) is higher than the deuterium burning limit (13 M_{J}). Another candidate around BD+29 5007 has an even larger orbit of about 22100 AU. There is no consensus about its age and the resulting mass, and it could be a field brown dwarf. The companion of ASASSN-21js has an orbit of about 13000 AU, but it is unknown if it is a brown dwarf or a planet due to its unknown mass.
Smallest orbital separation (smallest semi-major axis)	GALEX 0718+3731 b	GALEX 0718+3731	0.000834 AU	TOI-6324 b has the smallest orbital separation from a main-sequence star (an M dwarf) at ~0.0043 AU.
Most eccentric orbit	HD 20782 b	HD 20782	0.950	Could alternatively be HD 28254 b with an eccentricity at 0.95+0.03 −0.04. The possible planets HD 205577 b, SGR 1935+2154 b and SGR 1806-20 b have even higher eccentricities at 0.972+0.08 −0.002, 0.992 and 0.994, respectively.
Highest orbital inclination	HD 204313 e	HD 204313	176.092°+0.963° −2.122°	
Lowest orbital inclination	HD 331093 b	HD 331093	>0.3704°	HD 43197 c has the lowest orbital inclination that is not a lower limit, of 11.42°+5.388° −3.07°.
Largest semi-amplitude	WASP-18b	WASP-18	1814+23 −24 m/s	The planetary-mass objects CoRoT-3b, GPX-1 b and KELT-1Ab have larger semi-amplitudes at 2173±25 m/s, 2310±180 m/s and 4239±52 m/s, respectively; however they are likely brown dwarfs rather than planets.
Smallest semi-amplitude	Barnard's Star e	Barnard's Star	0.221±0.038 m/s	
Largest orbit around a single star	COCONUTS-2b	L 34-26	7506 AU	Next largest are 2MASS J2126–8140 with 6900 AU and WD 0806-661 b with ~2500 AU. UCAC4 328-061594 b has a significantly larger orbital separation (about 19000 AU), although its mass (21 M_{J}) is higher than the deuterium burning limit (13 M_{J}).
Smallest orbit around binary star	Kepler-47b	Kepler-47	0.2877+0.0014 −0.0011 AU	Kepler-1521 b has a smaller orbit with semi-major axis at 0.2347±0.0011 AU. The planet might be circumbinary, as the binarity of host star is suggested but not confirmed.
Smallest ratio of semi-major axis of binary star orbit to a planet orbiting one of the stars (S-type planet)	Nu Octantis Ab	Nu Octantis	2.06	
Largest orbit around binary star	SR 12 c	SR 12	≈1100 AU	SR 12 c has a mass of 0.013±0.007 M_{☉}. DT Virginis c, also known as Ross 458 c, at a projected separation of ≈1200 AU, with several mass estimates below the deuterium burning limit, has a latest mass determination of 27±4 M_{J}. The binary 2MASS J0249-0557 AB has a planetary-mass companion less massive than 13 M_{J} at a larger separation of 1950±200 AU, although this companion might have formed as a brown dwarf based on the mass ratio to the host stars.
Largest orbit around a single star in a multiple star system	DH Tauri b	DH Tauri	≈330 AU	
Largest separation between binary stars with a circumbinary planet	SR 12 c	SR 12	≈26 AU	SR 12 c has a mass of 0.013±0.007 M_{☉} at a projected separation of ≈1100 AU. FW Tauri b orbits at a projected separation of 330±30 AU around a ≈11 AU separated binary. It was shown to be likely a 0.1 M_{☉} star surrounded by a protoplanetary disk rather than a planetary-mass companion.
Largest orbit around three stars	Gliese 900 b (CW2335+0142)	Gliese 900	12000 AU	
Closest orbit between stars with a planet orbiting one of the stars (S-type planet)	DMPP-3 Ab	HD 42936	1.139 AU	DMPP-3 Ab's semi-major axis is around 0.067 AU.
Closest orbit between stars with planets orbiting both the stars	Struve 2398 Ab and Struve 2398 Bc	Struve 2398 A and Struve 2398 B	63±1 AU	The only known planet of Struve 2398 A has a semi-major axis of 0.068 AU while the confirmed planet of Struve 2398 B has a semi-major axis of 0.139 AU. TOI-2267 A and B are separated by shorter distance at 8 AU. Either both stars host transiting planets, or one of them host all three planets.
Smallest semi-major axis ratio between consecutive planets	Kepler-36b and Kepler-36c	Kepler-36	1.11	Kepler-36b and c have semi-major axes of 0.1153 AU and 0.1283 AU, respectively; hence the planet c is 1.11 times further from star than b. 2MASS J1657-5343 b and 2MASS J1657-5343 c have semi-major axes of 165 AU and 180 AU, resulting in the planet c being ~1.09 times further from star than b. Despite being listed in Extrasolar Planets Encyclopaedia as planets, these companions are most likely brown dwarfs based on the mass. There have been unconfirmed detections of co-orbital pairs of exoplanet, each of which has a semi-major axis ratio of almost 1.
Largest semi-major axis ratio between consecutive planets	WASP-4b and WASP-4c	WASP-4	347.1	WASP-4b and c have semi-major axes of 0.0229 AU and ≈7.95 AU, respectively; hence the planet c is about 347.1 times further from star than b. The disputed planets CVSO 30 b and CVSO 30 c have semi-major axes of 0.0084 AU and 662±96 AU, respectively. This might result in a larger ratio at 67380:1 – 90240:1.

== Stellar characteristics ==
Title	Planet	Star	Data	Notes
Highest metallicity	TOI-4666 b	TOI-4666	+0.79±0.14 dex	
Lowest metallicity	K2-344b	K2-344	−0.95±0.02 dex	BD+20 2457 may be the lowest-metallicity planet host ([Fe/H]=-1.00); however, the proposed planetary system is dynamically unstable. (Note: A later study found lower masses for the proposed orbiting planets, which may increase the dynamical stability of the system) Planets were announced around even the extremely low-metallicity stars HIP 13044 and HIP 11952; however, these claims have since been disproven. A brown dwarf or planetary-mass companion was announced around the population II star HE 1523-0901, whose metallicity is −2.65±0.22 dex. While the inclination of the companion is not known, if its orbit is nearly face-on, it would be sufficiently massive to be a red dwarf instead. A disputed substellar companion, possibly a Jovian planet, was announced to orbit the B-type subdwarf star HD 149382 with a metallicity of -1.30 dex.
Lowest color index	b Centauri b	b Centauri	−0.157±0.002	The subgiant star Pipirima has a lower B-V color index at -0.219, however its planetary-mass companions Mu2 Scorpii b and (the candidate) Mu2 Scorpii c might be either brown dwarfs or planets.
Highest color index	GJ 3512 b and GJ 3512 c	GJ 3512	+1.904±0.046	For reference, the Sun with its eight confirmed planets has a B-V color index of +0.656. A candidate planet was reported around the carbon star V Hydrae, whose B-V color index is higher at +5.43.
Highest stellar mass	b Centauri b	b Centauri	5–6 M_{☉}	The subgiant star Pipirima has a higher mass of 9.1±0.3 M_{☉}, but its planetary-mass companions Mu2 Scorpii b and (the candidate) c might be either brown dwarfs or planets. The candidate planemo IGR J12580+0134 b might be a blanet, whose host has a mass of 300 000-18 000 000 M_{☉}. The candidate exoplanet M51-ULS-1 b orbits two objects, a B-type supergiant with a mass of 20 M_{☉}, and a neutron star or black hole with a mass of 1.4 to 10 M_{☉}. (Note: M51-ULS-1 B has two different masses based on what it is, it would be 1.4 M_{☉} if it is a neutron star, and it would be 10 M_{☉} if it is a black hole) The star Mirfak (at 7.3±0.3 M_{☉}) has disproved orbiting planets. The stars R126 (HD 37974), R66 (HD 268835) and HH 1177 in the Large Magellanic Cloud have masses of 70, 30 and 12 M_{☉} and have dust discs but no planets have been detected yet.
Lowest stellar mass (main- sequence)	KMT-2021-BLG-1554Lb	KMT-2021-BLG-1554L	0.08+0.013 −0.014 M_{☉}	The mass of this star is near the hydrogen burning limit. KMT-2016-BLG-2142L has a lower mass of 0.073+0.117 −0.04 M_{☉}, but the value is highly uncertain.
Largest stellar radius	HD 220074 b	HD 220074	59.60+5.85 −6.31 R_{☉}	Other stars, such as HD 18438, Mirach and Delta Virginis are larger, but their substellar companions are more massive than the deuterium burning limit at about 13 M_{J}, and thus might be brown dwarfs rather than exoplanets. Candidate planets were reported around the red giants V Camelopardalis (716±185 R_{☉}), R Fornacis (585 R_{☉} (Note: Determined using known angular diameter and distance. 0.008 milliarcseconds * 680 pc = diameter of 5.44 au.)), V Hydrae (430 R_{☉}), R Leonis (320−350 R_{☉}) and L2 Puppis (123±14 R_{☉}). The stars R126 and R66 in the Large Magellanic Cloud have radii of 78 R_{☉} and 131 R_{☉} and have dust discs but no planets have been detected yet.
Smallest stellar radius	PSR J1211-0633 b	PSR J1211-0633	0.0000143 R_{☉} (9.9 km)	A hypothetical planet was proposed to orbit SGR 1935+2154, whose radius is smaller at 4.35 km (6.25×10^{−6} R_{☉}).
Smallest stellar radius (brown dwarf)	TVLM 513-46546b	TVLM 513-46546	0.097–0.109 R_{☉}	Lower than that of any brown dwarf in the NASA Exoplanet Archive.
Smallest stellar radius (main-sequence star)	TRAPPIST-1 planets	TRAPPIST-1	0.1192±0.0013 R_{☉}	VB 10 (at 0.102 R_{☉}) has a disproven planet candidate.
Highest stellar luminosity	HD 158996 b	HD 158996	849.2 L_{☉} (Note: 10^2.929 = 849.2)	This is the most luminous star to host a confirmed planet that is not a potential brown dwarf. The star Mirfak, whose luminosity is 3780 L_{☉}, was claimed to have an orbiting planet with a minimum mass of 6.6±0.2 M_{J}. However, the existence of the planet is doubtful. Candidate planets were reported around the red giants V Hydrae (at 18000 L_{☉}), U Equulei (at ~6000 L_{☉}), R Fornacis (at 5800 L_{☉}), R Leonis (at 3537 L_{☉}), L2 Puppis (at 1490±150 L_{☉}) and BD+20 2457 (at 1479 L_{☉}). The host star system of the unconfirmed planet M51-ULS-1 b has a luminosity of ≈260 000 L_{☉}. (Note: 10^{39} erg/s = 260,000 L_{☉}) The stars R126, R66 and HH 1177 in the Large Magellanic Cloud have luminosities of 1400000 L_{☉}, 320000 L_{☉} and 19000 L_{☉} and have dust discs but no planets have been detected yet.
Lowest stellar luminosity (main-sequence star)	TRAPPIST-1 planets	TRAPPIST-1	0.0005495 L_{☉}	
Highest stellar rotational velocity	Kappa Andromedae b	Kappa Andromedae	~176 km/s	The star HIP 64892 rotates slightly faster at projective velocity 178 km/s; however its orbiting companion, which weighs at ~29–37 M_{J} and is listed as a planet by EPE, might be most likely a brown dwarf. The stars 51 Ophiuchi, HD 38056 and Phi Leonis rotate at 267±5 km/s, ~195 km/s and ~254 km/s (respectively) and have dust discs but no planets have been detected yet.
Hottest star with a planet	SWIFT J1756.9−2508 b	SWIFT J1756.9−2508	4640000 K	(Note: The cited black-body temperature at the poles of 0.4 keV = 400 eV corresponds to approximately 4640000 K (see Electronvolt#Temperature))
Hottest non-compact star with a planet	NSVS 14256825 planets	NSVS 14256825	40000 K (primary)	NN Serpentis is hotter, with a temperature of 57000 K for the primary star, but the existence of its planets is disputed. A candidate planet was found orbiting the O-type subdwarf TOI-709, whose effective temperature is higher at 50000 K.
Hottest main-sequence star with a planet	b Centauri b	b Centauri	18310±320 K	
Coolest star with a planet	TRAPPIST-1 planets	TRAPPIST-1	2511 K	Technically the primary components of Oph 162225-240515, CFBDSIR 1458+10, WISE J0336−0143 and WISE 1217+1626 are cooler, but are classified as brown dwarfs. The cooler stars R Fornacis at 2100 K and V Camelopardalis at 2414±86 K were both claimed to have a planet candidate. A gas giant planet was found orbiting TVLM 513-46546, which is an ultracool star (2242 K) located close to the brown dwarf/red dwarf mass boundary.

== System characteristics ==
Title	System(s)	Planet(s) (in order from star)	Star(s)	Notes
System with most planets	Kepler-90	8 (b, c, i, d, e, f, g, h)	1	Tau Ceti currently has no confirmed planetary companion, although it has been proposed that the number of orbiting planets may be 8, 9 or even 10. The three planets Tau Ceti f, g and h are considered as strong candidates. HD 10180 has six confirmed planets and potentially three more planets. As a reference, the Solar System has eight verified major planets, alongside multiple dwarf planets (the existence of Planet Nine and Planet Ten is yet unconfirmed). (Note: Hypothetical Planet Nine may be challenged by the discovery of 2017 OF_{201} which its orbit is anti-aligned to the calculated orbit of Planet Nine. The existence of 2017 OF_{201}, which also means that there are likely many other similar objects that are just obscured from earth observation, challenges one of the leading arguments for Planet Nine, that its gravity causes trans-Neptunian objects to cluster into a distinct region. It is suggested hypothetical Planet Nine would have ejected 2017 OF_{201} from its current orbit over times scales of less than 100 million years, though it could be in a temporary orbit.)
System with most planets in habitable zone	TRAPPIST-1	4 (b, c, d, e, f, g, h)	1	Four planets in this system (d, e, f and g) orbit within the circumstellar habitable zone.
System with most planets in exact orbital resonance	HD 110067	6 (b, c, d, e, f, g)	3	Each consecutive pair of the planets b, c, d, e, f and g is locked in the resonance of 3:2, 3:2, 3:2, 4:3 and 4:3, respectively.
System with most stars	Kepler-64	b	4	PH1b (Kepler-64b) has a circumbinary orbit. 30 Arietis Bb was believed to be either brown dwarf or a massive gas giant in a quadruple star system before later studies revealing a true mass well above the red dwarf-mass limit of 80 M_{J}. The planetary mass-companion HIP 81208 Cb will be potentially located in a quadruple star system, if the star Gaia DR3 6020420074469092608 is confirmed to be gravitationally bound to the system. The quintuple and quadruple star systems GG Tauri and HD 98800 both have several protoplanetary disks but no planets have been detected yet. Similarly, the star β^{3} Tucanae A, located in a sextuple star system, was suggested to have a debris disk with no planets having been found.
System with most stellar-like objects	Kepler-64	b	4	PH1b (Kepler-64b) has a circumbinary orbit. The polar circumbinary planet 2M1510 b is located in either a tertiary or a quadruple system of brown dwarfs. The planetary-mass object 2MASS J04414489+2301513 b is within a quadruple system with one star and two brown dwarfs.
Multiplanetary system with smallest mean semi-major axis (planets are nearest to their star)	Kepler-42	b, c, d	1	Kepler-42 b, c and d have a semi-major axis of 0.0116, 0.006 and 0.0154 AU, respectively. Kepler-70 b, c and d (all unconfirmed and disputed) have a semi-major axis of only 0.006, 0.0076 and ~0.0065 AU, respectively.
Multiplanetary system with largest mean semi-major axis (planets are farthest from their star)	YSES 1	b, c	1	YSES 1 b and c have a semi-major axis of ~162 and ~320 AU, respectively.
Multiplanetary system with smallest range of semi-major axis (smallest difference between the star's nearest planet and its farthest planet)	Kepler-42	b, c, d	1	Kepler-42 b, c and d have a semi-major axis of 0.0116, 0.006 and 0.0154 AU, respectively. The separation between closest and furthest is therefore 0.0094 AU. Kepler-70 b, c and d (all unconfirmed and disputed) have a semi-major axis of only 0.006, 0.0076 and ~0.0065 AU, respectively. The separation between closest and furthest is therefore shorter at 0.0016 AU (240,000 km).
Multiplanetary system with largest range of semi-major axis (largest difference between the star's nearest planet and its farthest planet)	AB Pictoris	c, b	1	AB Pictoris b and c have semi-major axes of ~190 and ~4 AU, respectively. The separation between closest and furthest is thus around 186 AU. Two planetary-mass objects with masses slightly above the deuterium limit Mu2 Scorpii b and c (the later is unconfirmed) have semi-major axes of ~19 and ~242 AU, respectively; hence the range of semi-major axis is about 223 AU.
System with smallest total planetary mass	Barnard's Star	d, b, c, e	1	The planets d, b, c and e have minimum masses of 0.263, 0.299, 0.335 and 0.193 Earth masses, respectively. For comparison, Mars has a mass of 0.105 Earth masses.
System with largest total planetary mass	HR 8799	e, d, c, b	1	Four planets each having masses within the range 6.0 – 9.6 M_{J}. The total mass might be larger as there might be an additional planet orbiting HR 8799 with a mass of about 1.65 M_{J}. Nu Ophiuchi b and c have masses of 24.2 and 26.8 Jupiter masses, respectively. They are likely brown dwarfs. HD 81817 b and c have masses of 24.1 and ≥22.6 Jupiter masses, respectively. These companions are also likely brown dwarfs.
Multiplanetary system with smallest mean planetary mass	Barnard's Star	d, b, c, e	1	The planets d, b, c and e have minimum masses of 0.263, 0.299, 0.335 and 0.193 Earth masses, respectively. For comparison, Mars has a mass of 0.105 Earth masses.
Multiplanetary system with largest mean planetary mass	Titawin	b, c, d	2	The three planets b, c and d have masses of 1.70+0.33 −0.24, 14.0+2.3 −5.3 and 10.2+0.7 −3.3 Jupiter masses, respectively. This results in a mean planetary mass of 5.7 – 9.7 M_{J}. Could alternatively be the system of HR 8799, in which four planets each have masses within the range 5.7 – 9.1 M_{J}. Nu Ophiuchi b and c have masses of 24.2 and 26.8 Jupiter masses, respectively. They are likely brown dwarfs. HD 81817 b and c have masses of 24.1 and ≥22.6 Jupiter masses, respectively. These companions are also likely brown dwarfs.
Exo-multiplanetary system with smallest range in planetary mass, log scale (smallest proportional difference between the most and least massive planets)	HD 37124	b, c, d	1	HD 37124 c and d are estimated to have masses of 0.652 and 0.69 Jupiter masses, respectively (hence a ratio of about 1.058 to 1).
Exo-multiplanetary system with largest range in planetary mass, log scale (largest proportional difference between the most and least massive planets)	Gliese 676A	d, e, b, c	2	Gliese 676A c and d have a mass ratio of about 975 to 1. (Note: 13.49*318/4.4 = 975. The true mass of planet c was measured in 2022. Assuming that the minimum mass of planet d is its true mass.) For comparison, Mercury and Jupiter have a mass ratio of 5780 to 1. The planet KMT-2020-BLG-0414Lc and the super-Earth KMT-2020-BLG-0414Lb have a mass ratio of about 4590 to 1, (Note: 27*318/1.87 = 4591.4) although at 27.0+4.0 −3.1 Jupiter masses KMT-2020-BLG-0414Lc might or might not be considered as a brown dwarf.

== See also ==
- Extremes on Earth
- Lists of exoplanets
- List of exoplanet firsts
- List of stars with proplyds
- Methods of detecting exoplanets
- List of potentially habitable exoplanets
