= BD+29 5007 =

Star in the constellation Pegasus

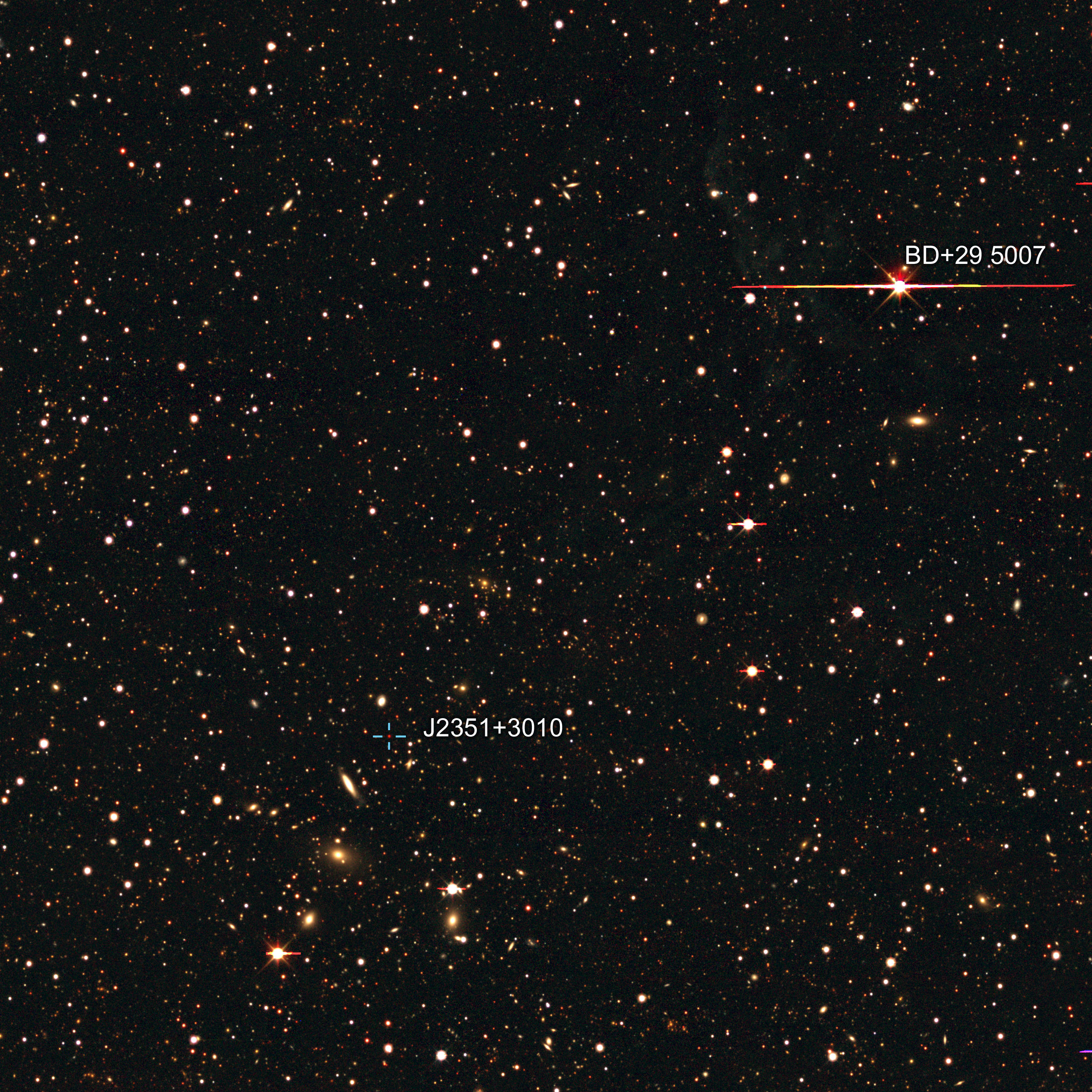
- BD+29 5007 and its companion

Observation data Epoch J2000 Equinox ICRS
- Constellation: Pegasus
- Right ascension: 23^{h} 50^{m} 27.862^{s}
- Declination: +30° 21′ 11.73″
- Apparent magnitude (V): 9.35

Characteristics
- Evolutionary stage: main sequence
- Spectral type: K5V
- B−V color index: 1.226±0.024

Astrometry
Radial velocity (R_{v})	−3.77±0.19 km/s
Proper motion (μ)	RA: 255.381 mas/yr Dec.: 10.628 mas/yr
Parallax (π)	42.2919±0.0166 mas
Distance	77.12 ± 0.03 ly (23.645 ± 0.009 pc)
Absolute magnitude (M_{V})	7.46

Details
Mass	0.671±0.021 M_{☉}
Radius	0.703±0.021 R_{☉}
Luminosity	0.160±0.004 L_{☉}
Surface gravity (log g)	4.51 cgs
Temperature	4,327±144 K
Metallicity [Fe/H]	−0.05 dex
Rotation	13.99 days
Rotational velocity (v sin i)	4.5 km/s
Age	5 Gyr

Other designations
- BD+29°5007, GJ 9841, HIP 117559, SAO 73544, PPM 89170

Database references
SIMBAD	data

BD+29 5007 is a K-type star, located 77 light-years away in the constellation Pegasus. It has a large-separation companion that was identified in 2016. The pair was identified as a possible member of the 45-million year old Argus association, though this is disputed.

== Properties ==
The star has a mass of 0.671±0.021 M_{☉}, a radius of 0.703±0.021 R_{☉} and a temperature of 4327±144 Kelvin. It has a spectral type of K5V.

== Companion ==
The companion is 2MASS J23512200+3010540 (short: 2MASS J2351+3010) that was discovered in 2010 and first identified as a possibly young low-mass object in 2014 by the BANYAN II survey. The authors find a L5.5 dwarf with red near-infrared colors. If it is a member of Argus, it should have a mass of 9−11 M_{J}, according to the authors. However, the BANYAN VII survey in 2015 revised the status of 2MASS J2351+3010 to a field object, i.e. not a member of any stellar cluster or association. This is also suggested by measured surface gravity of 2MASS J2351+3010, consistent with that of a field object. This would mean that the companion is too massive to have a planetary mass (i.e. its mass is larger than 13 M_{J}).

In 2016 it was identified as a possible companion to BD+29 5007. In 2024 it was again identified as an Argus member with a mass of 11.9+0.4
−0.2 M_{J}. The same authors calculate that this system has a probability of 1.71% to be a false-positive match. The companion is separated by 935 arcseconds, which translates into 22,100 astronomical units at this distance. This high separation is larger than the 12,000 AU projected separation of Gliese 900 b, currently the planetary-mass object with the longest known orbit, and is similar to brown dwarfs such as UCAC4 328-061594.

== See also ==
- List of exoplanet extremes
- COCONUTS-2b
- 2MASS J2126−8140
