= Carina-Near moving group =

Moving group in the Carina constellation

The Carina-Near moving group is a moving group of stars with about 20 stars located roughly 30 parsecs from Earth in the constellation of Carina. It also partially surrounds the Sun with many stars close enough to be included in the Gliese catalogue (GJ 150, GJ 358, GJ 900 and GJ 907). The nucleus of the Carina-Near moving group is coincidentally quite close to the nucleus of another moving group, the AB Doradus moving group. This does not mean that these two groups are related as they have different characteristics, including age and their motions in the galaxy.

== Population ==
The group consist of roughly 20 stars ranging from spectral class K to F (there seems to be a lack of stars in the M-type) that are around 200 million years old. There also seems to be an abundance of multiple star systems, with only 3 stars in the group (HIP 36414, HIP 37635 and HIP 47425) being single star systems. It consists of two parts, the nucleus and its surrounding stellar stream. In the nucleus, members (ex. HR 3070) are more secured than those found in the stream (ex. GJ 358). SIMP J013656.5+093347 is a planetary-mass object located in the Carina-Near moving group.

== Chemical abundances ==
Chemical abundances of stars within the Carina-Near moving group are similar to stars located in the disk of the Milky Way suggesting that these stars did not undergo peculiar chemical enrichment. It has a mean iron abundance of [Fe/H]= 0.08 ± 0.06 dex. Other elements show roughly solar abundance. None of the stars have extremely metal-rich abundances, which may present a problem for the discovery of exoplanets in the group as high metallicity seems to be related to the existence of them.
