= 2MASS J2126−8140 =

Exoplanet orbiting the red dwarf TYC 9486-927-1

2MASS J21265040−8140293
Discovery
- Discovered by: K. L. Cruz, J. D. Kirkpatrick, A. J. Burgasser
- Discovery date: 2009
- Detection method: Direct imaging

Orbital characteristics
- Semi-major axis: 6,900 AU (1.03×10^{12} km)
- Orbital period (sidereal): 328,725,000 days (~900,000 years)
- Star: TYC 9486-927-1

Physical characteristics
- Mean radius: 1.39±0.19 R_{J}
- Mass: 13.3±1.7 M_{J}
- Surface gravity: 4.4±0.42 cgs
- Temperature: 1663±135 K
- Spectral type: L3.0
- Apparent magnitude: 20.72 (G-band)

2MASS J21265040−8140293, also known as 2MASS J2126−8140, is an exoplanet orbiting the red dwarf TYC 9486-927-1, 111.4±0.3 light-years away from Earth. Its estimated mass, age (10-45 million years), spectral type (L3), and T_{eff} (1800 K) are similar to the well-studied planet β Pictoris b. With an estimated distance of around 1 trillion kilometers from the host star, it is located in one of the largest planetary systems ever discovered.

== See also ==
- COCONUTS-2b
- Gliese 900
