= Cool Companions on Ultrawide Orbits =

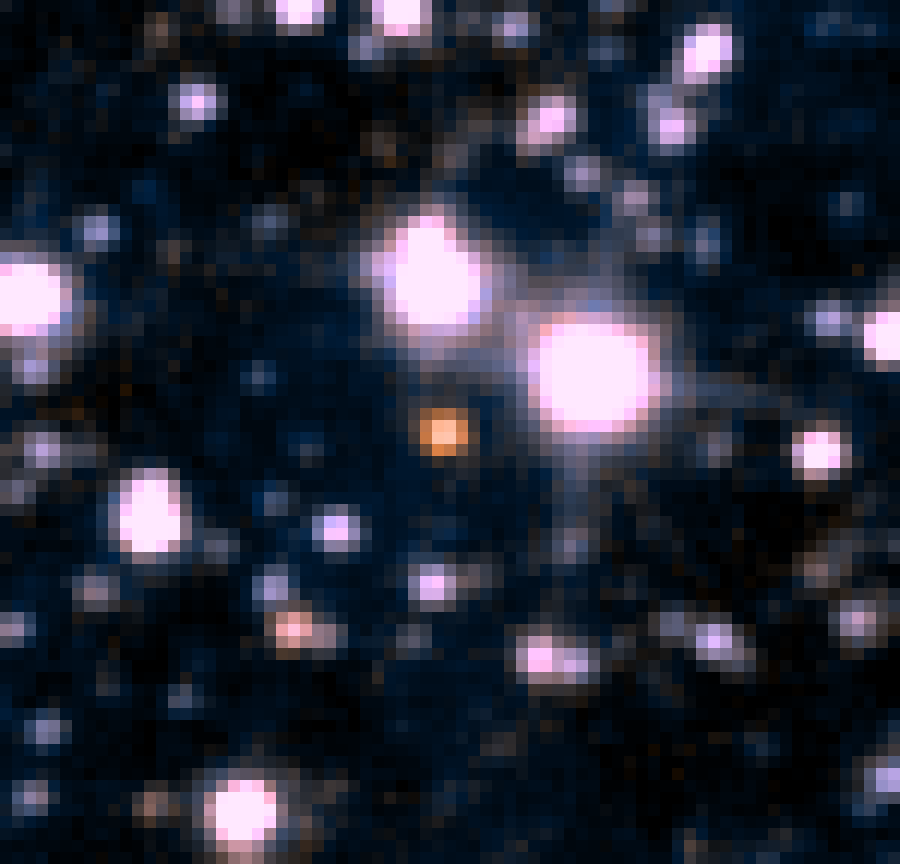
COCONUTS-2b

The COol Companions ON Ultrawide orbiTS (COCONUTS) program is a large-scale survey for wide-orbit planetary and substellar companions considered the first survey of this type of celestial bodies. In 2021, the team announced COCONUTS-2b, the closest exoplanet directly imaged ever. The program is a dedicated large-scale search for wide-orbit giant planets and brown dwarf companions, targeting a sample of 300,000 stars. By using multi-wavelength photometry and multi-epoch astrometry, astronomers are able to assess the candidates' companionship and ultracool nature.

== List of discoveries ==
| Name | Companion class | Mass (M_{J}) | Orbital separation (AU) | Host star | Star class | Host star mass (M_{☉}) | Discovery year | Reference |
|---|---|---|---|---|---|---|---|---|
| COCONUTS-1B | brown dwarf | 15.4 or 69.3 | 1280 | PSO J058.9855+45.4184 | old white dwarf | 0.548 | 2020 | |
| COCONUTS-2b | exoplanet | 6.3 | 6471 | L 34-26 | young M-dwarf | 0.37 | 2021 | |
| COCONUTS-3B | brown dwarf | 39 | 1891 | UCAC4 374-046899 | young M-dwarf | 0.123 | 2022 | |

== See also ==
- List of exoplanet search projects
