= TYC 9486-927-1 =

Primary star of a trinary star system in the constellation Octans

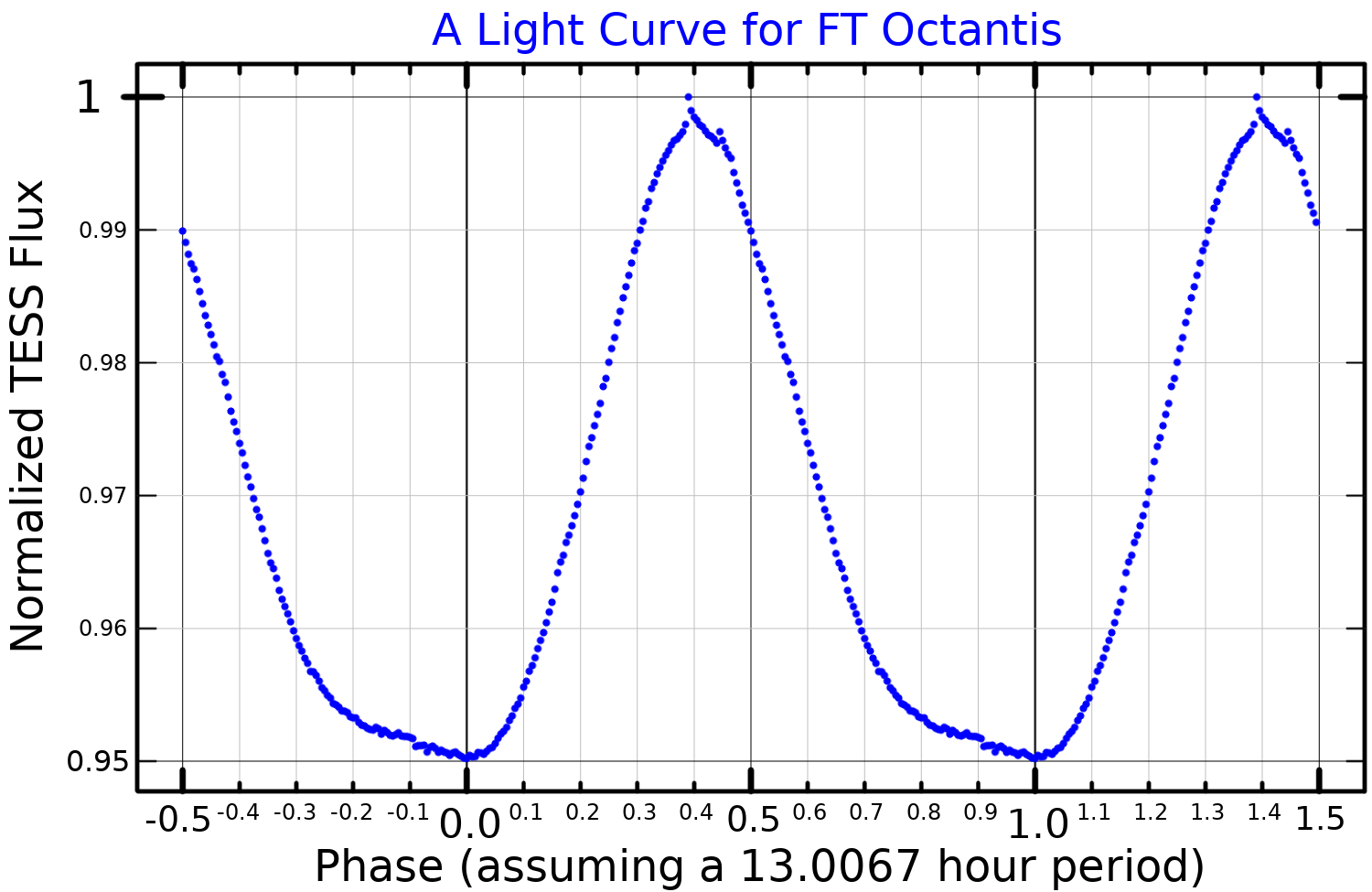
- A light curve for FT Octantis, plotted from TESS data

Observation data Epoch J2000 Equinox ICRS
- Constellation: Octans
- Right ascension: 21^{h} 25^{m} 27.4805^{s}
- Declination: −81° 38′ 27.692″
- Apparent magnitude (V): 11.5 - 12.0

Characteristics
- Spectral type: M1 V
- Variable type: BY Dra

Astrometry
Radial velocity (R_{v})	8.7±4.6 km/s
Proper motion (μ)	RA: 60.645(46) mas/yr Dec.: −107.740(48) mas/yr
Parallax (π)	29.0266±0.0401 mas
Distance	112.4 ± 0.2 ly (34.45 ± 0.05 pc)

Details
Mass	0.53 M_{☉}
Radius	0.46 R_{☉}
Luminosity	0.032 L_{☉}
Surface gravity (log g)	4.3 cgs
Temperature	3,490 K
Metallicity [Fe/H]	−1.3 dex
Rotation	0.541945 days
Rotational velocity (v sin i)	43.5±1.2 km/s
Age	10-45 Myr

Other designations
- 2MASS J21252752-8138278, FT Octantis

Database references
SIMBAD	data

TYC 9486-927-1 (also known as 2MASS J21252752-8138278) is the primary of a possible trinary star system located at a distance of 34.5 parsecs from Earth in the southern direction in the constellation of Octans. It is a BY Draconis variable, with large starspots causing it to change brightness as it rotates every 13 hours.

TYC 9486-927-1 has rapid rotation and coronal and chromospheric activity suggestive of a young age. Observations and multi-epoch radial velocity data suggest that TYC 9486-927-1 is a single, rapidly rotating star rather than a spectroscopic or tight visual binary. However, it is still possible that TYC 9486-927-1 is an equal mass binary with a face-on orbit and close separation.

The candidate secondary stellar companion is 2MASS J21121598–8128452. It is a red dwarf star of spectral class M5.5. Its projected separation from the primary would be 62,700 AU. The candidate tertiary companion is 2MASS J21192028–8145446 - of spectral class M6 or M7 and at a projected separation of 31,000 AU from the primary.

== Planetary system ==
The planet 2MASS J21265040-8140293 orbits TYC 9486-927-1 at a projected separation of 7400 AU. With a mass from 11.6 to 15 Jupiter masses, it is considered to be either a brown dwarf, or a giant planet.

The TYC 9486-927-1 planetary system
Companion (in order from star)	Mass	Semimajor axis (AU)	Orbital period (days)	Eccentricity	Inclination (°)	Radius
2MASS J2126–8140/b	13.3 (± 1.7) M_{J}	6,900	—	—	—	1.39 R_{J}
