= HD 149382 =

Star in the Ophiuchus constellation

Observation data Epoch J2000 Equinox ICRS
- Constellation: Ophiuchus
- Right ascension: 16^{h} 34^{m} 23.33337^{s}
- Declination: −04° 00′ 52.0301″
- Apparent magnitude (V): 8.943

Characteristics
- Evolutionary stage: horizontal branch
- Spectral type: B5 VI
- U−B color index: −1.143
- B−V color index: −0.282
- V−R color index: −0.127
- R−I color index: −0.135

Astrometry
Radial velocity (R_{v})	+3 km/s
Proper motion (μ)	RA: −6.234 mas/yr Dec.: −5.780 mas/yr
Parallax (π)	13.2407±0.0567 mas
Distance	246 ± 1 ly (75.5 ± 0.3 pc)

Details
Mass	0.29 – 0.53 M_{☉}
Radius	0.143 R_{☉}
Luminosity	25.2 L_{☉}
Surface gravity (log g)	5.80±0.05 cgs
Temperature	35,500±500 K
Metallicity [Fe/H]	−1.30 dex
Rotational velocity (v sin i)	4.9±1.4 km/s

Other designations
- BD−03°3967, HD 149382, HIP 81145, SAO 141250

Database references
SIMBAD	data

HD 149382 is a hot subdwarf star in the constellation of Ophiuchus with an apparent visual magnitude of 8.943. This is too faint to be seen with the naked eye even under ideal conditions, although it can be viewed with a small telescope. Based upon parallax measurements, this star is located at a distance of about 246 light-years (75.5 parsecs) from the Earth.

This is the brightest known B-type subdwarf star with a stellar classification of B5 VI. It is generating energy through the thermonuclear fusion of helium at its core (triple-alpha process). The effective temperature of the star's outer envelope is about 35,500 K, giving it the characteristic blue-white hue of a B-type star. Although only about one seventh the diameter of the Sun, it radiates about 25 times as much due to its high temperature. HD 149382 has a visual companion located at an angular separation of 1 arcsecond.

In 2009, a substellar companion, perhaps even a superjovian planet, was announced orbiting the star. This candidate object was estimated to have 8 to 23 times the mass of Jupiter. In 2011, this discovery was thrown into doubt when an independent team of astronomers were unable to confirm the detection. Their observations rule out a companion with a mass greater than Jupiter orbiting with a period of less than 28 days.

== See also ==
- List of brown dwarfs
