= WASP-127 =

Old G-type star with one exoplanet

Observation data Epoch J2000 Equinox ICRS
- Constellation: Sextans
- Right ascension: 10^{h} 42^{m} 14.0837^{s}
- Declination: −03° 50′ 06.260″
- Apparent magnitude (V): 10.165(46)

Characteristics
- Evolutionary stage: subgiant
- Spectral type: G5
- Apparent magnitude (J): 9.092±0.029
- Apparent magnitude (H): 8.738±0.055
- Apparent magnitude (K): 8.641±0.019
- Variable type: Planetary transit

Astrometry
Radial velocity (R_{v})	−8.92±0.06 km/s
Proper motion (μ)	RA: 19.133±0.020 mas/yr Dec.: 17.058±0.018 mas/yr
Parallax (π)	6.2241±0.0175 mas
Distance	524 ± 1 ly (160.7 ± 0.5 pc)

Details

A
Mass	0.949+0.022 −0.019 M_{☉}
Radius	1.335+0.025 −0.029 R_{☉}
Luminosity	1.8 L_{☉}
Surface gravity (log g)	4.23±0.02 cgs
Temperature	5,842±14 K
Metallicity [Fe/H]	−0.19±0.01 dex
Rotational velocity (v sin i)	0.53+0.07 −0.05 km/s
Age	9.7±1.0 Gyr

B
Mass	0.997 M_{☉}
Radius	0.929 R_{☉}
Temperature	5629 K

Other designations
- BD−03 2978, TOI-675, TYC 4916-912-1, GSC 04916-00912, 2MASS J10421407-0350062, Gaia DR3 3778075717162985600

Database references
SIMBAD	data
Exoplanet Archive	data

WASP-127 is an old G5-type star that is around 9.7 billion years old and located 524 light-years from Earth in the constellation of Sextans. It has a mass of 0.9 solar masses, a radius of 1.3 solar radii and a temperature of 5,842 Kelvin. There is so far one planet detected, a low-density sub-Saturn type.

== Stellar system ==
WASP-127 is a G5-type star, less massive but with a radius about 30% larger than the Sun's. It has reached the end of its main sequence phase at 9.7 billion years old and is transitioning into its subgiant phase. The star is photometrically stable and slowly rotating.

== Planetary system ==
The WASP-127 planetary system
Companion (in order from star)	Mass	Semimajor axis (AU)	Orbital period (days)	Eccentricity	Inclination (°)	Radius
b	0.1647+0.0214 −0.0172 M_{J}	0.04840+0.00136 −0.00095	4.17806473(25)	0.0 (fixed)	87.84+0.36 −0.33	1.311+0.025 −0.029 R_{J}

Currently, one planet is known to orbit WASP-127, which is described as either a super-Neptune or a sub-Saturn planet with a mass 16% that of Jupiter and a heavily inflated radius 1.3 times that of Jupiter. This results in it being one of the least dense planets known. It orbits its star in just over four days.

=== WASP-127b ===
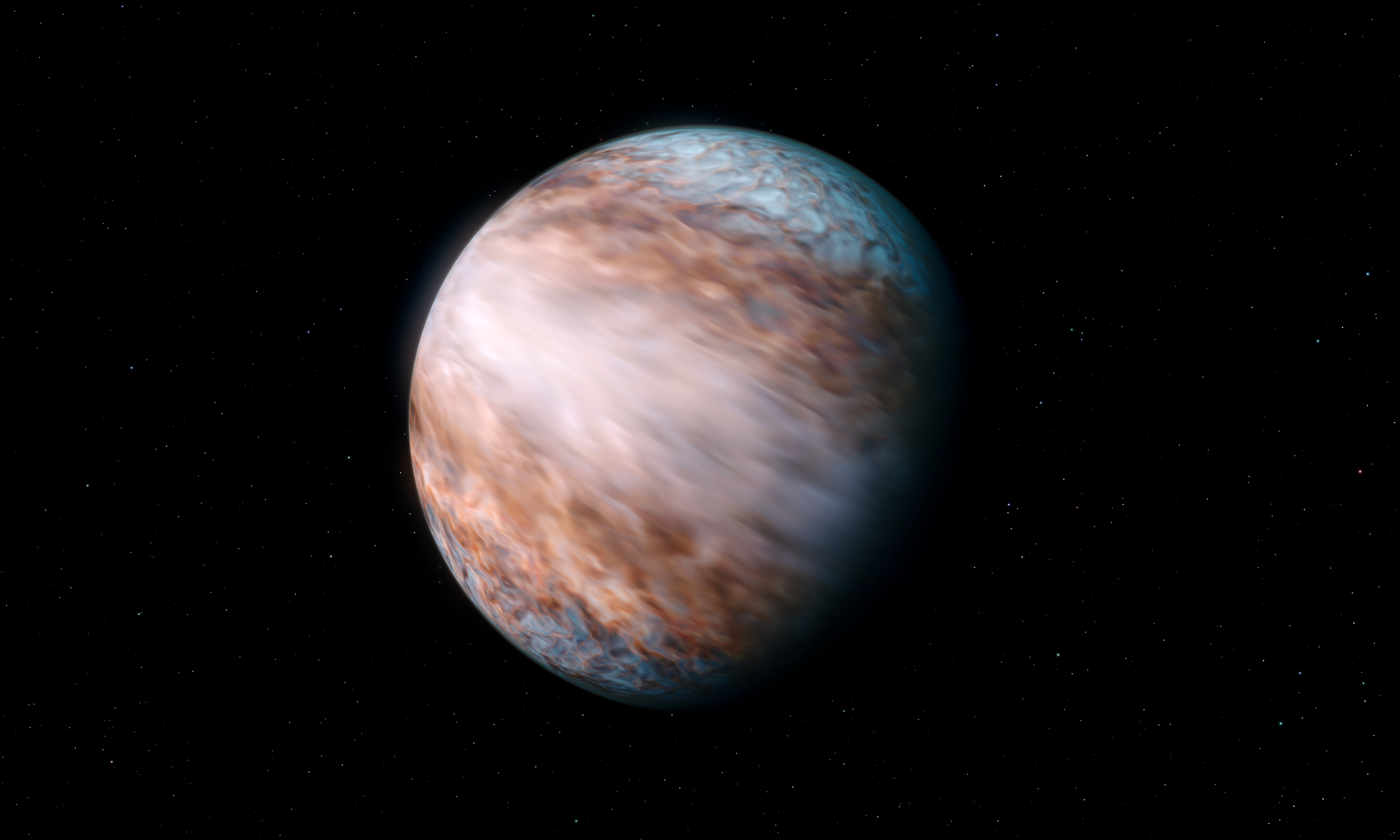
Artistic impression of WASP-127b with supersonic winds

==== Discovery ====
WASP-127b, along with WASP-136b and WASP-138b, was discovered by the Wide Angle Search for Planets. The host star, WASP-127, was monitored from 2006 to 2014, accumulating 87,349 photometric data points. Analysis of this data resulted in the discovery of the transits of WASP-127b across the face of its parent star. Follow-up photometry from various telescopes was utilized to refine the system parameters. Radial velocity measurements, conducted by the CORALIE spectrograph and the SOPHIE échelle spectrograph, served to confirm the planet's presence and ascertain its mass.

==== Orbit ====
The planet takes only four days to orbit its star and is aligned such that it transits in front of its host star once per orbit as seen from earth. A study of the secondary eclipse, when the planet passes behind its host star, by the Spitzer Space Telescope found that the best-fit eclipse phases for WASP-127b are consistent with the expectation for a circular orbit.

Observations of the Rossiter–McLaughlin effect during two transits using the ESPRESSO spectrograph at the European Southern Observatory's Very Large Telescope indicate that WASP-127b, unlike the planets in the Solar System, orbits in the opposite direction to its star and on a different plane than the equatorial one. A reanalysis of the same data by a different team came to the same conclusion. This is an unusual alignment for a hot Saturn within an ancient stellar system and may suggest the presence of an unseen companion.

==== Atmosphere ====
The first indication of a feature-rich transmission spectrum on this planet was obtained at low resolution with the Andalucia Faint Object Spectrograph and Camera (ALFOSC) mounted on the 2.5-meter Nordic Optical Telescope at Roque de los Muchachos Observatory. These findings were later confirmed with higher precision using the OSIRIS instrument at the 10.4-meter Gran Telescopio Canarias, also located at the Roque de los Muchachos Observatory, showing not only sodium and potassium absorption but also a tentative detection of lithium in the planets atmosphere. However, a follow-up study of the planet at high resolution in the optical wavelength range only measured a weak signal for sodium with ESPRESSO at the 8-meter Very Large Telescope, while another study with the High Accuracy Radial Velocity Planet Searcher (HARPS) was compatible with a non-detection. The atmosphere was further constrained by successful eclipse measurements with Spitzer, which determined the planet's dayside temperature as approximately 1,400 Kelvin.

Low-resolution space based spectroscopy obtained with the Wide Field Camera 3 on the Hubble Space Telescope led to a detection of water in the planet's transmission spectrum. An atmospheric retrieval study combining the Hubble and Spitzer transit data led to conflicting carbon-to-oxygen ratios depending on whether chemical equilibrium or free chemistry assumptions were adopted. This degeneracy was seemingly solved through recent high-resolution observations of this target over a large wavelength range in the near-infrared using the SPIRou spectrograph, which yielded a detection of water and OH but no carbon monoxide. The non-detection of carbon monoxide led to strong upper limits on the carbon monoxide abundance and favored a disequilibrium case with a low C/O ratio for this planet in the joint retrieval of SPIRou, Hubble Space telescope and Spitzer data. The water and OH signals found in this high-resolution study were detected to be strongly blue-shifted from the planet's rest frame and the authors discussed the possibly of this signal being only part of a broadened velocity signature, with other parts of the signal hidden within the noise. An additional study in 2024 used high-resolution spectroscopy from the Immersion GRating INfrared Spectrometer (IGRINS) instrument to confidently detect carbon monoxide in the atmosphere, corroborating evidence published near-simultaneously from the upgraded infrared spectrograph Cryogenic high-Resolution InfraRed Echelle Spectrograph+ (CRIRES+).

==== Wind ====
During the transit event of WASP-127b on the night of 24–25 March 2022, CRIRES+ on the 8m UT3 telescope at the Very Large Telescope Facility of the European Southern Observatory was utilized. The transmission spectrum obtained revealed strong water and carbon monoxide signals with two distinct cross-correlation peaks. This dual-peaked signal suggests a supersonic equatorial jet and weaker signals at the poles, with the peaks corresponding to the planet's morning and evening terminators. An equatorial jet velocity of 7.7 km/s was deduced from the overall equatorial velocity of 9.3 km/s and the planet's tidally locked rotation, leading to the identification of different atmospheric properties for both terminators and the polar regions. The evening terminator appears hotter than the morning by 175 K, and the subdued polar signals could be due to much lower temperatures or a high cloud cover. The analysis resulted in a solar C/O ratio and metallicity determination.
