= PSR J0738−4042 =

Pulsar in the constellation Puppis

Observation data Epoch J2000 Equinox ICRS
- Constellation: Puppis
- Right ascension: 07^{h} 38^{m} 32.329^{s}
- Declination: −40° 42′ 40.94″

Characteristics
- Spectral type: Pulsar

Astrometry
Distance	37,000 ly (11,300 pc)

Details
Rotation	0.374919985032 s
Age	4.32 Myr

Other designations
- PSR J0738−4042

Database references
SIMBAD	data

PSR J0738−4042 is the first pulsar observed to have been affected by asteroids.

It was originally discovered in 1968. In 2013 scientists at the University of Oxford, Hartebeesthoek Observatory and CSIRO announced that they had observed changes in the pulsar's spin rate and the shape of its radio pulse indicating that asteroids were encountering it, including one with a mass of about a billion tons.

We think the pulsar's radio beam zaps the asteroid, vaporising it. But the vaporised particles are electrically charged and they slightly alter the process that creates the pulsar's beam.

— Dr. Ryan Shannon,

The scientists suggested that the material blown out from the explosion which formed the pulsar could have fallen back towards it, developing a disk of debris including asteroids.
