= TOI-157 =

G-type subgiant star with a hot Jupiter orbiting it

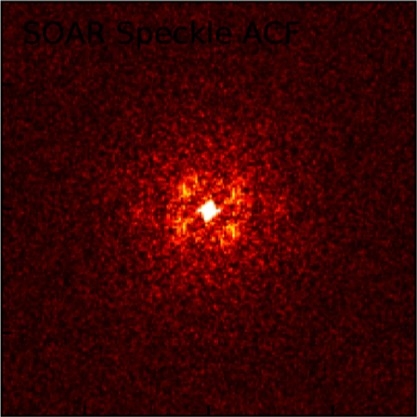
- TOI-157; Credit: L. D. Nielsen

Observation data Epoch J2000 Equinox ICRS
- Constellation: Mensa
- Right ascension: 04^{h} 54^{m} 48.292^{s}
- Declination: −76° 40′ 49.89″

Characteristics
- Evolutionary stage: subgiant
- Spectral type: G9IV

Astrometry
Proper motion (μ)	RA: 11.849±0.013 mas/yr Dec.: −18.732±0.013 mas/yr
Parallax (π)	2.8128±0.0105 mas
Distance	1,160 ± 4 ly (356 ± 1 pc)

Details
Mass	0.923 M_{☉}
Radius	1.0977 R_{☉}
Luminosity	1.106 L_{☉}
Surface gravity (log g)	4.3027 cgs
Temperature	5629 K
Age	12.82+0.73 −1.40 Gyr

Other designations
- 2MASS J04544830-7640498, TIC 140691463, Gaia DR3 4624979393181971328

Database references
SIMBAD	data

TOI-157 (also known as TIC 140691463) is a G-type subgiant star located about 1160 light years (356 pc) from Earth. It has a mass of about 0.92 solar masses, a radius of about 1.1 solar radii and a temperature of about 5600 K. It is approximately 12.0 to 12.8 billion years old.

== Planetary system ==
It has one discovered exoplanet orbiting it named TOI-157b. It is a gas giant classed as a hot Jupiter with a mass of 1.18 Jupiter masses and a radius of 1.286 Jupiter radii. It orbits very close to the star taking only 2 days to complete an orbit. This places the temperature of TOI-157b to be around 1588 Kelvin. Using TESS data discrepant transit parameters as well as empirical limb-darkening coefficients could be determined. Further analysis revealed that the radius ratio of planet to star is 7.8 ± 0.4 % higher than previously determined, caused by blending with the light from background stars, at a new value of 0.1229 ± 0.0005.

=== Age ===
It is a typical hot Jupiter. However, at an age of 12.82+0.73
−1.4 billion years the planet is currently the oldest discovered and only about 1 billion years younger than the age of the universe at about 13.8 billion years. Only PSR B1620-26 b with 11.2–12.7 Gyr remains as alternatively oldest exoplanet.
