= TVLM 513-46546 =

Brown dwarf star in the constellation Boötes

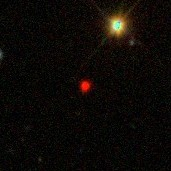
- TVLM 513-46546 (the red dot in the center), as seen by the Sloan Digital Sky Survey.

Observation data Epoch J2000 Equinox ICRS
- Constellation: Boötes
- Right ascension: 15^{h} 01^{m} 08.18646^{s}
- Declination: +22° 50′ 02.1379″
- Apparent magnitude (V): 15.09

Characteristics
- Evolutionary stage: Brown dwarf
- Spectral type: M9

Astrometry
| Proper motion (μ) | RA: −43.120±0.111 mas/yr Dec.: −65.138±0.140 mas/yr |
| Parallax (π) | 93.1655±0.1355 mas |
| Distance | 35.01 ± 0.05 ly (10.73 ± 0.02 pc) |

Details
| Mass | 0.06–0.08 M_{☉} |
| Radius | 0.097 – 0.109 R_{☉} |
| Luminosity | 0.00026 L_{☉} |
| Temperature | 2242±55 K |
| Rotation | 1.96 h |
| Rotational velocity (v sin i) | 60 km/s |
| Age | >400 Myr |

Other designations
- 2MASS J15010818+2250020, 2MASSI J1501081+225001, 2MUCD 20596

Database references
| SIMBAD | data |

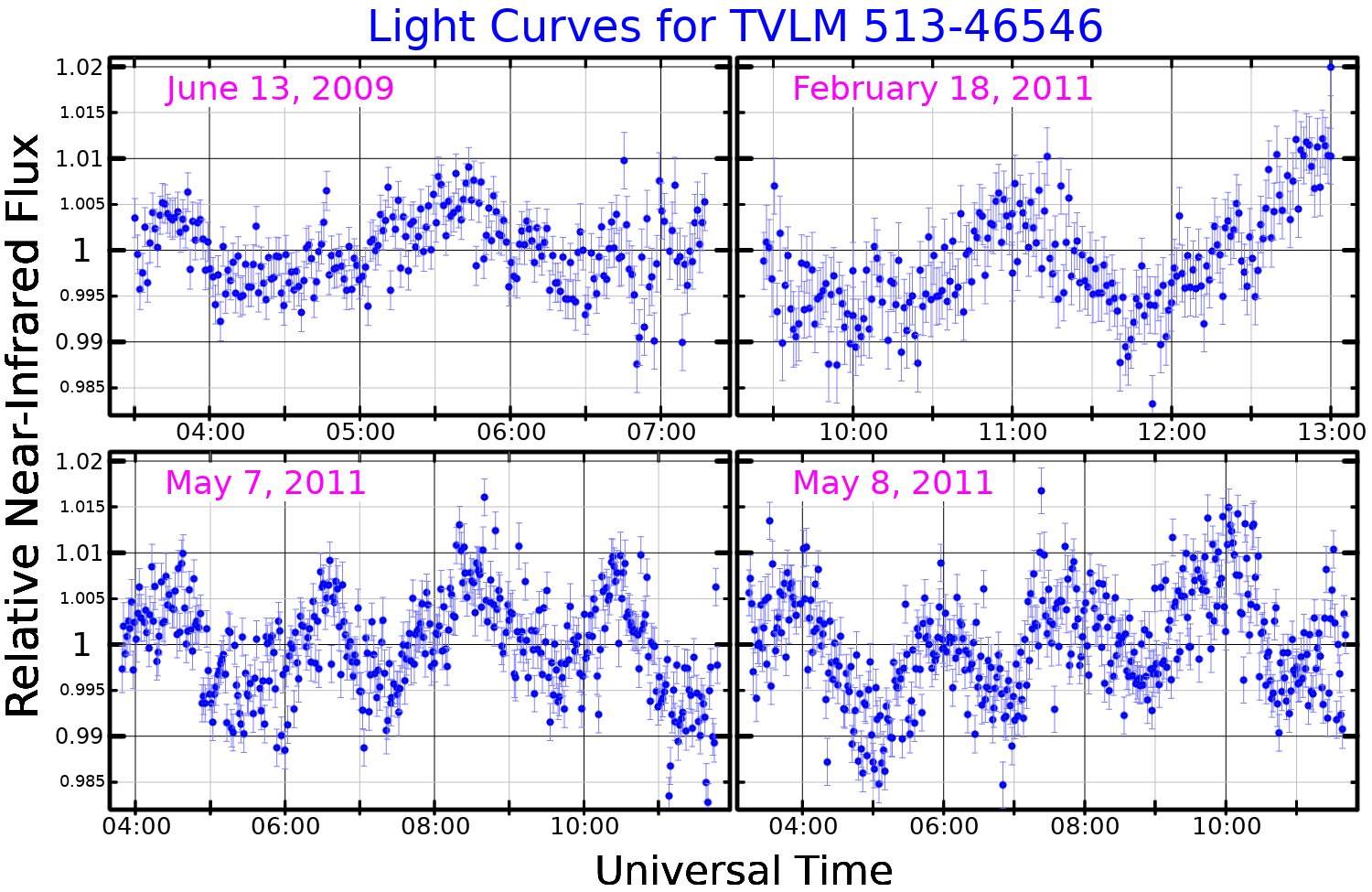
Near-infrared light curves for TVLM 513–46546, adapted from Harding et al. (2013)

TVLM 513-46546 is an M9 ultracool dwarf at the red dwarf/brown dwarf mass boundary in the constellation Boötes. It exhibits flare star activity, which is most pronounced at radio wavelengths. The star has a mass approximately 80 times the mass of Jupiter (or 8 percent of the Sun's mass). The radio emission is broadband and highly circularly polarized, similar to planetary auroral radio emissions. The radio emission is periodic, with bursts emitted every 7054 s, with nearly one hundredth of a second precision. Subtle variations in the radio pulses could suggest that the ultracool dwarf rotates faster at the equator than the poles (differential rotation) in a manner similar to the Sun.

== Planetary system ==
On 4 August 2020 astronomers announced the potential discovery of a Saturn-like planet TVLM 513b around this star with a period of 221±5 days, a mass of between 0.35 and 0.42 M_{J}, a circular orbit (e≃0), a semi-major axis of between 0.28 and 0.31 AU and an inclination angle of 71−88°. The companion would have been detected by the radio astrometry method. However, the discovery awaits independent confirmation.

The TVLM 513-46546 planetary system
| Companion (in order from star) | Mass | Semimajor axis (AU) | Orbital period (days) | Eccentricity | Inclination (°) | Radius |
|---|---|---|---|---|---|---|
| b | 0.35−0.42 M_{J} | 0.28−0.31 | 221±5 | 0 | 71−88 | — |
