= WASP-18b =

Extrasolar planet that has an orbital period of less than one day

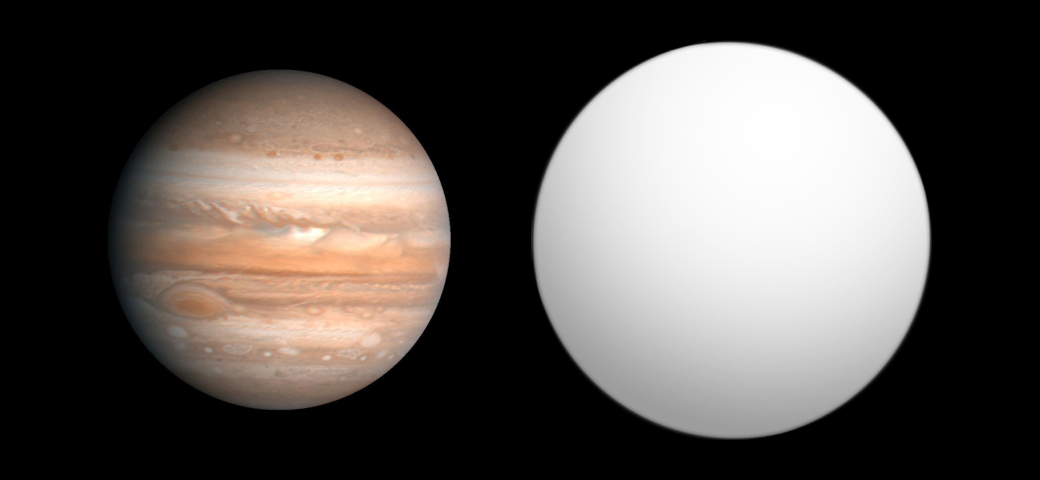
- Size comparison of WASP-18b with Jupiter.

Discovery
- Discovered by: Hellier et al. (SuperWASP)
- Discovery date: August 27, 2009
- Detection method: Transit (including secondary eclipses)

Orbital characteristics
- Semi-major axis: 0.02041+0.00015 −0.00014 au (3,053,000 km)
- Eccentricity: 0.0051+0.0070 −0.0037
- Orbital period (sidereal): 0.941452379(16) days (22.6 hours)
- Inclination: 84.08°±0.17°
- Argument of periastron: −85°+72° −96°
- Semi-amplitude: 1,814.73(70) m/s
- Star: WASP-18

Physical characteristics
- Mean radius: 1.1926±0.0077 R_{J}
- Mass: 10.20±0.35 M_{J}
- Mean density: 6.6+1.2 −1.1 g/cm^{3}
- Albedo: Geometric: 0.027±0.011
- Temperature: 3,061 ± 29 K (2,787.8 ± 29.0 °C; 5,050.1 ± 52.2 °F)

WASP-18b is an exoplanet that is notable for having an orbital period of less than one day. It has a mass equal to 10 Jupiter masses, just below the boundary line between planets and brown dwarfs (about 13 Jupiter masses). Due to tidal deceleration, it is expected to spiral toward and eventually merge with its host star, WASP-18, in less than a million years. The planet is approximately 3.1 million km (1.9 million mi; 0.021 AU) from its star, which is about 400 light-years (120 parsecs) from Earth. A team led by Coel Hellier, a professor of astrophysics at Keele University in England, discovered the exoplanet in 2009.

Scientists at Keele and at the University of Maryland are working to understand whether the discovery of this planet so shortly before its expected demise (with less than 0.1% of its lifetime remaining) was fortuitous, or whether tidal dissipation by WASP-18 is actually much less efficient than astrophysicists typically assume. Observations made over the next decade should yield a measurement of the rate at which WASP-18b's orbit is decaying. The closest example of a similar situation in the Solar System is Mars' moon Phobos. Phobos orbits Mars at a distance of only about 9,000 km (5,600 mi), 40 times closer than the Moon is to the Earth and is expected to be destroyed in about eleven million years.

A study in 2012, utilizing the Rossiter–McLaughlin effect, determined that the planetary orbit is well aligned with the equatorial plane of the star, with a misalignment equal to 13±7°.

== Temperature ==
The planet's dayside temperature, as measured in 2020, is 3,029 ± 50 K (2,755.8 ± 50.0 °C; 4,992.5 ± 90.0 °F). A 2023 study found an average dayside temperature of 2,781+25
−13 K (2,508 °C; 4,546 °F). It has been theorized that highly irradiated ultra-hot Jupiters like WASP-18b have large variations in atmospheric temperature and chemistry as a function of longitude, latitude and altitude. WASP-18b was observed with the Near Infrared Imager and Slitless Spectrograph instruments on JWST creating a resolved atmosphere in multiple dimensions. Mapping confirmed theoretical models revealing a weaker longitudinal temperature gradient. It also indicated the importance of hydrogen dissociation and/or nightside clouds role in shaping thermal emission on the global scale.

== Atmosphere ==
A 2017 study detected carbon monoxide in the planet's atmosphere, without signs of water vapor. However, in 2023, the James Webb Space Telescope detected water vapor in the planet's atmosphere.

There are two thermally distinct identified regions on the planets atmosphere. The first is the "hotspot" surrounding the substellar point. near the dayside limbs. The hotspot region shows a strongly inverted thermal structure due to the presence of optical absorbers and a water abundance marginally lower than average. The second region is a "ring" near the dayside limb. This region shows colder temperatures and poorly constrained chemical abundances.

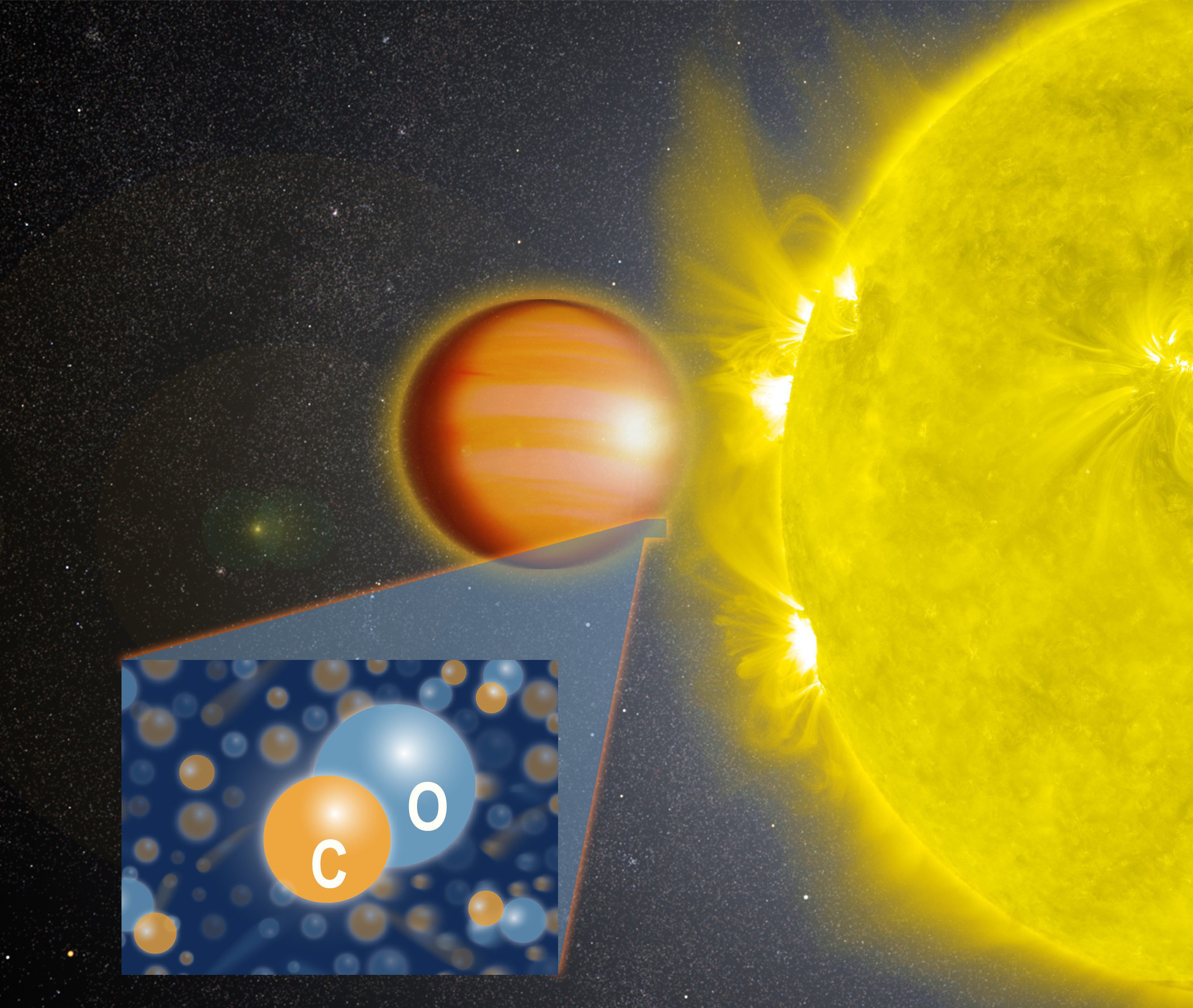
Exoplanet WASP-18b − high carbon monoxide levels detected in stratosphere (artist concept)

== See also ==
- SuperWASP
