= YSES 1 =

Star in the constellation Musca

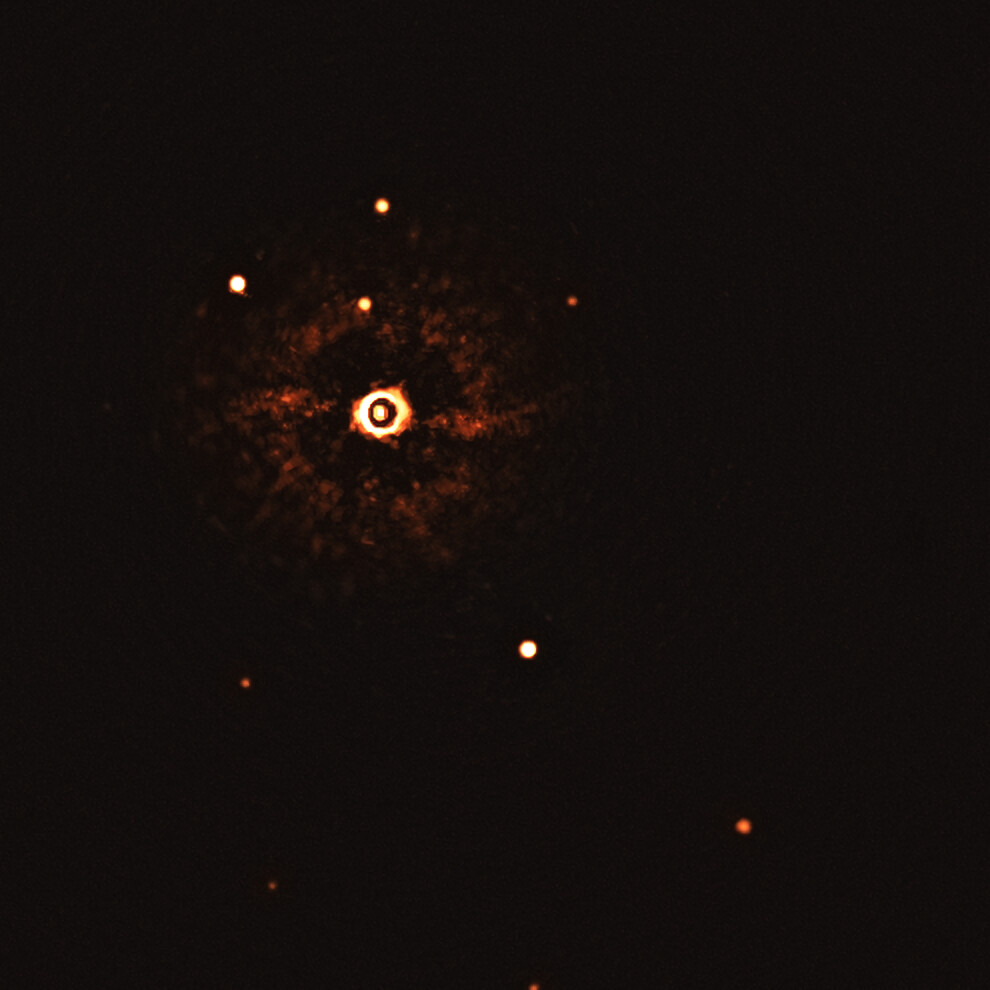
- YSES 1 (TYC 8998-760-1), accompanied by two giant exoplanets, YSES 1b and YSES 1c taken by ESO SPHERE (See annotated version)

Observation data Epoch J2000 Equinox J2000
- Constellation: Musca
- Right ascension: 13^{h} 25^{m} 12.1263^{s}
- Declination: −64° 56′ 20.689″
- Apparent magnitude (V): 11.19

Characteristics
- Evolutionary stage: Pre main sequence
- Spectral type: K3IV

Astrometry
Radial velocity (R_{v})	12.84 km/s
Proper motion (μ)	RA: −40.996 mas/yr Dec.: −17.734 mas/yr
Parallax (π)	10.6124±0.0116 mas
Distance	307.3 ± 0.3 ly (94.2 ± 0.1 pc)

Details
Mass	1.00 M_{☉}
Radius	1.02±0.01 R_{☉}
Luminosity	10^{−0.34±0.01} L_{☉}
Surface gravity (log g)	4.46+0.38 −0.46 cgs
Temperature	4,708+30 −33 K
Age	15±3 – 27±3 Myr

Other designations
- TIC 449888653, 2MASS J13251211-6456207, YSES 1

Database references
SIMBAD	data

YSES 1, also known as TYC 8998-760-1, is a pre-main-sequence star located 310 light years away from Earth in the constellation of Musca, with a mass 1.00±0.02 times the Sun.

== Planetary system ==
There are two giant substellar bodies orbiting the star. In 2020, the European Southern Observatory's Very Large Telescope photographed the two bodies using its SPHERE instrument, producing the first direct image of multiple bodies orbiting a Sun-like star.

The YSES 1 planetary system
Companion (in order from star)	Mass	Semimajor axis (AU)	Orbital period (years)	Eccentricity	Inclination (°)	Radius
b	25.7+4.1 −3.6 or 41.6+3.6 −3.4 M_{J}	146+16 −10	—	0.44+0.17 −0.18	90.6+1.1 −1.0	1.58+0.06 −0.07, 1.89+0.06 −0.05 or 2.08±0.06 R_{J}
c	7.2±0.7 M_{J}	320	—	—	—	1.48+0.04 −0.05 R_{J}

=== YSES 1 b ===
YSES 1 b is the inner companion, orbiting at 146 AU (2.18×10^{10} km; 1.36×10^{10} mi) from the host star, or slightly more than 5 times the Neptune-Sun distance. Its mass was initially estimated at 14 M_{J} based on an age of 15 Myr and later at 21.8 M_{J} based on an age of 27 Myr. The planetary parameters were revised in 2026, resulting in two mass values of 25.7+4.1
−3.6 and 41.6+3.6
−3.4 M_{J}, depending on the age. These revised values put YSES 1 b within the brown dwarf regime. In July 2021, astronomers reported the detection, for the first time, of an isotope in the atmosphere of an exoplanet; more specifically, the isotope Carbon-13 (C^{13}) was found in the atmosphere. This was later confirmed with VLT/CRIRES^{+}. This spectrum showed that the atmosphere is dominated by water vapor and carbon monoxide. The researchers also detect hydrogen fluoride in the atmosphere. The object is an L-dwarf with a spectral type of L0. Observations with the James Webb Space Telescope detected silicate emission from YSES 1b, indicating the presence of a circumplanetary disk. The emission was attributed to submicron olivine dust grains. These very small and hot grains might have formed from collisions of satellites forming inside the circumplanetary disk. Observations with VLT MUSE revealed emission by hydrogen (Hα, Hβ), calcium (H+K lines) and helium, coming from YSES 1b. These lines are attributed to accretion of material from the circumplanetary disk to the surface of the planet. It is the first object in this mass range with these full combination of lines. The planet accretes between 1.11 × 10^{−9±0.19} M_{J}/yr and 1.45 × 10^{−9±0.19} M_{J}/yr (or the mass equivalent of at least 21 Lutetia per year).

=== YSES 1 c ===
YSES 1 c is a substellar object with a mass of 7.2 M_{J}, and orbits at 320 AU (4.8×10^{10} km; 3.0×10^{10} mi), or slightly more than 11 times the Neptune-Sun distance. Atmospheric water vapor and carbon monoxide was detected with VLT/CRIRES^{+}. The object is of spectral class L7.5. Additionally, JWST spectra with NIRSpec and MIRI were published. The spectrum of YSES 1 c does show direct detection of silicate clouds.
