= SWIFT J1756.9−2508 =

Millisecond pulsar in the constellation Sagittarius

Observation data Epoch J2000.0 Equinox ICRS
- Constellation: Sagittarius
- Right ascension: 17^{h} 56^{m} 57.200^{s}
- Declination: −25° 06′ 26.28″

Astrometry
Distance	26,000 ly (8,000 pc)

Details
Mass	1.8±0.4 M_{☉}
Rotation	5.4945054945055 ms

Database references
SIMBAD	data

SWIFT J1756.9−2508 is a millisecond pulsar with a rotation frequency of 182 Hz (period of 5.4945 milliseconds). It was discovered in 2007 by the Swift Gamma-Ray Burst Explorer and found to have a companion with a mass between 0.0067 and 0.030 solar masses. It is thought that the companion is the remnant of a former companion star, now stripped down to a planetary-mass core. The pulsar is accreting mass from this companion, resulting in occasional violent outbursts from the accumulated material on the neutron star.

== Planetary system ==
SWIFT J1756.9-2508's only known planet is notable for its orbital period of less than an hour, about 54 minutes and 43 seconds.

The SWIFT J1756.9−2508 planetary system
Companion (in order from star)	Mass	Semimajor axis (AU)	Orbital period (days)	Eccentricity	Inclination (°)	Radius
b	7.8 (± 1.3) M_{J}	—	0.0379907 (± 5e-07) d	—	—	—
