= R Fornacis =

Variable star in the constellation Fornax

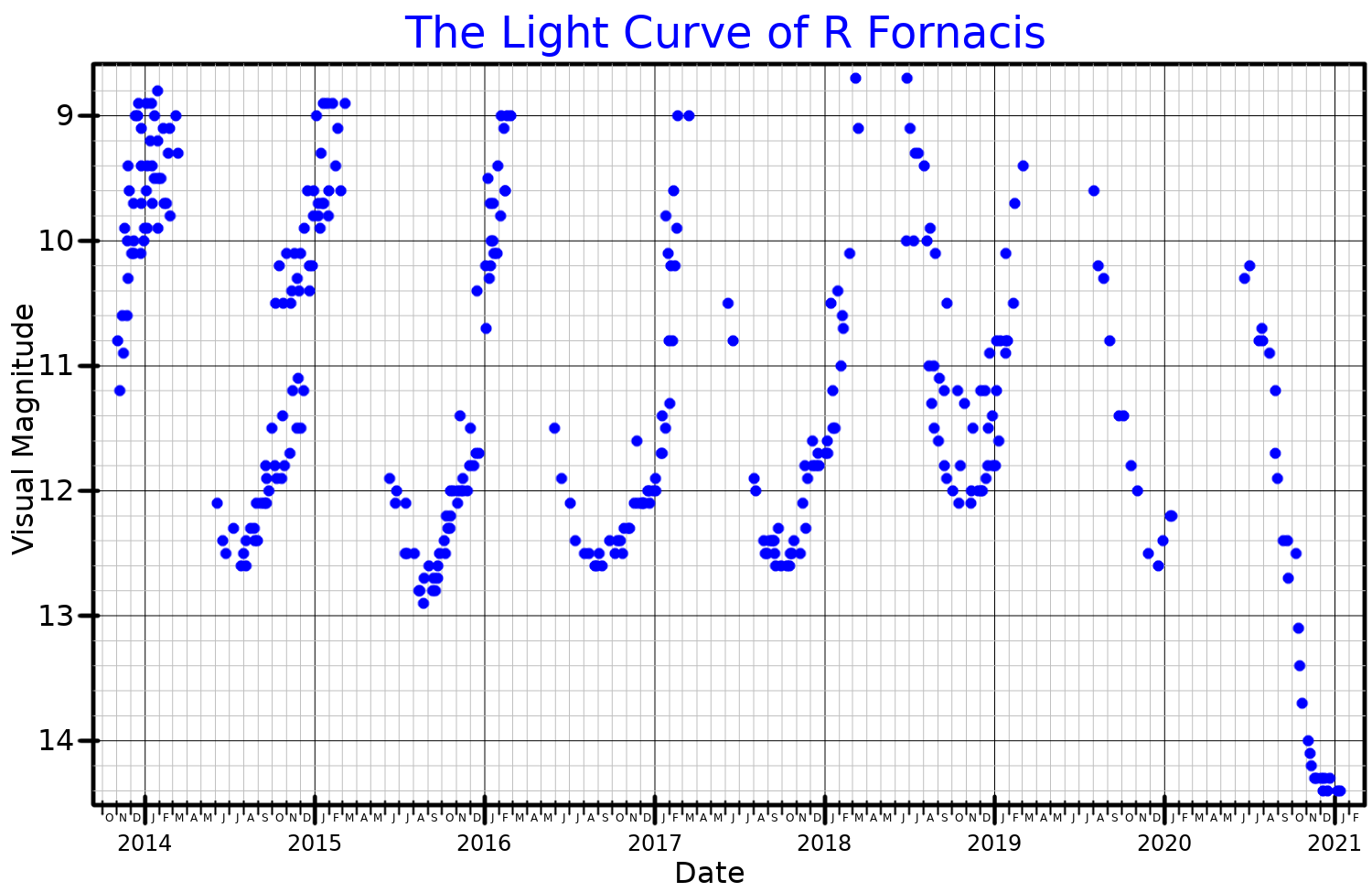
- The visual band light curve of R Fornacis, from AAVSO data

Observation data Epoch J2000.0 Equinox J2000.0
- Constellation: Fornax
- Right ascension: 02^{h} 29^{m} 15.308^{s}
- Declination: −26° 05′ 55.65″
- Apparent magnitude (V): 7.5 - 13.0

Characteristics
- Evolutionary stage: AGB
- Spectral type: C4,3e
- Apparent magnitude (J): 3.82
- Apparent magnitude (K): 1.06
- Variable type: Mira

Astrometry
Proper motion (μ)	RA: +8.551 mas/yr Dec.: −3.957 mas/yr
Parallax (π)	1.8069±0.0358 mas
Distance	1,810 ± 40 ly (550 ± 10 pc)

Details
Mass	1.05 M_{☉}
Radius	575 (Note: Applying the Stefan–Boltzmann law with a nominal solar effective temperature of 5,772 K: $$\sqrt{\biggl(\frac{5,772}{2,100}\biggr)^4 \cdot 5,800} = 575.35\ R_\odot$$.) R_{☉}
Luminosity	5,800 L_{☉}
Surface gravity (log g)	0.12 cgs
Temperature	2,100 K
Metallicity [Fe/H]	0.21 dex

Other designations
- R For, CD−26°892, IRAS 02270−2619, 2MASS J02291531−2605559

Database references
SIMBAD	data

R Fornacis is a Mira variable and carbon star located in the constellation Fornax. It is around 1,800 light years away based on parallax measurements.

R Fornacis is a carbon star, a star on the asymptotic giant branch with an excess of carbon over oxygen in its atmosphere due to fusion products being dredged up to the surface from deep inside the star. It is also a Mira variable, a type of pulsating giant star which varies by several apparent magnitudes with a period of a few hundred days. R Fornacis has a period of 389 days and varies between extremes of magnitude 7.5 and 13.0, although average maximum and minimum magnitudes are 8.9 and 12.2 respectively.

R Fornacis was discovered to be variable in 1896 after it had been observed with a different brightness to that shown in the Cordoba Durchmusterung. In 1983, an unusually deep minimum was observed, and later correlated with an asymmetric shell of material ejected from the surface of the star. Unconfirmed visual estimates of the unusual minimum give a magnitude of 14.0, while infrared observations confirm the unusual variation.

== Possible planetary system ==
A study led by C. Paladini, using near-infrared interferometry at the Very Large Telescope, detected a photocenter shift between R Fornacis and an object on its circumstellar envelope. This might be caused by a dust blob that moves around the circumstellar dust, or by a Jovian-mass companion (~1 M_{J}), with an orbital period around R Fornacis of 185 years.
