= GALEX J071816.4+373139 =

White dwarf star in the constellation Auriga

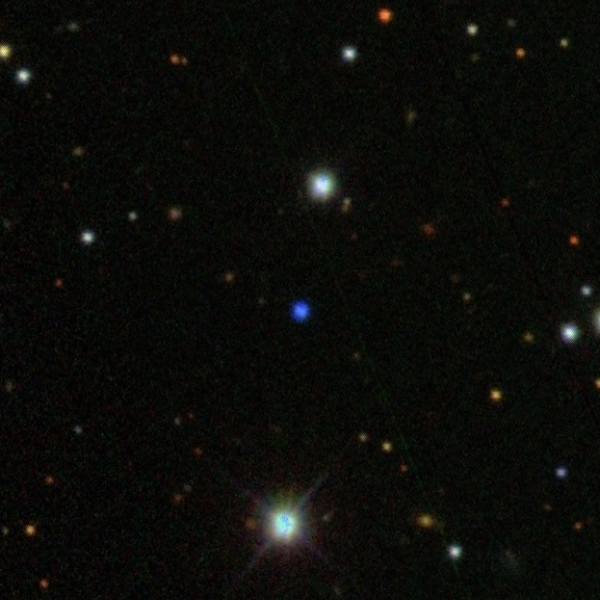
- SDSS image of GALEX J0718+3731 (blue dot in the center)

Observation data Epoch J2000 Equinox ICRS
- Constellation: Auriga
- Right ascension: 07^{h} 18^{m} 16.42350^{s}
- Declination: +37° 31′ 39.2363″

Characteristics
- Evolutionary stage: white dwarf
- Spectral type: DC

Astrometry
Proper motion (μ)	RA: −34.878±0.085 mas/yr Dec.: −35.816±0.080 mas/yr
Parallax (π)	11.8194±0.095 mas
Distance	276 ± 2 ly (84.6 ± 0.7 pc)

Details
Mass	1.27–1.29 M_{☉}
Radius	0.01 R_{☉}
Temperature	42,065 K
Rotation	11.3 min
Age	cooling age: 0.2 Gyr

Other designations
- GALEX J0718+3731, SDSS J071816.40+373139.0, SDSS J071816.41+373139.1, Gaia DR2 898348313253395968, Gaia DR3 898348313253395968

Database references
SIMBAD	data

GALEX J071816.4+373139 (originally WD 0718+3731) is a massive young white dwarf located in the constellation Auriga, approximately 276 light-years away from the Sun. This star was first discovered by the GALEX space telescope during its ultraviolet sky survey while the mission was operational (2003–2013).

== Star characteristics ==
The white dwarf has a spectral type of DC, a mass ranging from 1.27 to 1.29 solar masses, and a radius of 6,955 km, or 0.01 solar radius. The star has a rotation period of 11.3 minutes and a magnetic field strength of approximately 8 MG. Its age is 0.2 billion years, or 200 million years. It is presumed to have formed from the merger of two less massive white dwarfs, which explains its high mass, strong magnetic field, and rapid rotation.

== Planetary-mass object ==
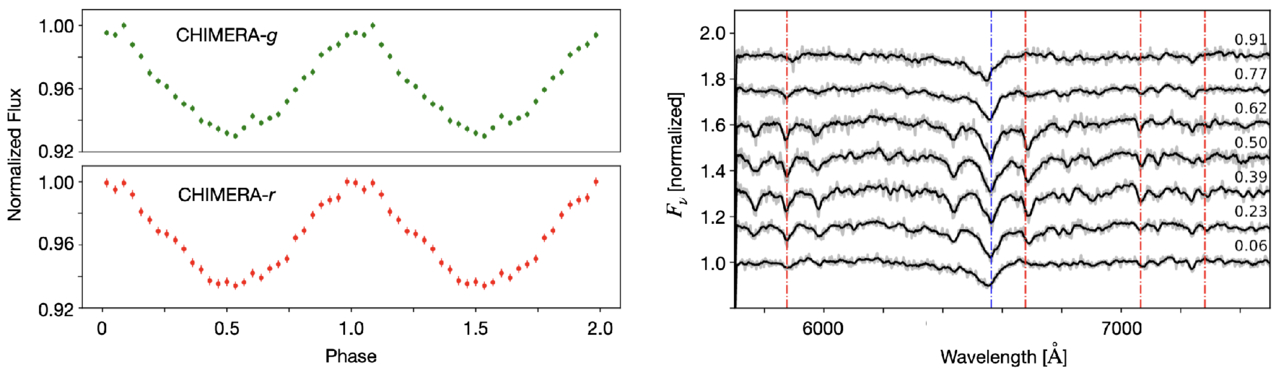
Time-resolved photometric and spectroscopic observations of GALEX J071816.4+373139

In 2024, a group of astronomers led by Sihao Cheng, while analyzing archival data from the Spitzer Space Infrared Telescope, discovered a planetary-mass object around the young white dwarfs GALEX J071816.4+373139. The researchers were initially looking for infrared excesses in young, massive white dwarfs whose parameters had been previously refined by the Gaia mission. However, during the analysis of the star's spectrum, an "infrared excess" was noticed. The system was emitting more heat than a single white dwarf should.

Initially, it was considered that a possible dusty disk with a temperature of around 650 K, which could have created the flux excess at [4.5]. However, such a dusty disk would have produced significant flux excesses at [5.8] and [8.0]. Detailed analysis revealed that the source of this heat was a compact object, which they identified as a giant planet, designated GALEX J071816.4+373139 b.

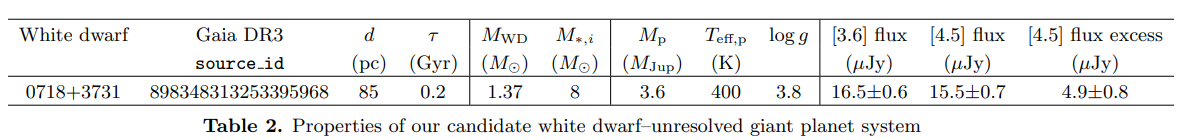
Properties of Our Candidate White Dwarf–Unresolved Giant Planet System

The exoplanet candidate has a mass of approximately 3.6 Jupiter masses and a temperature of around 400 K. Its surface gravity is 3.8 cgs.

This is an example of how giant planets form and survive in orbits around massive B-type stars, which then evolve into white dwarfs.

The object is a priority target for the James Webb Space Telescope mission. The spectroscopic studies will allow for the precise determination of the atmosphere's chemical composition and possibly confirm its existence.
