= WASP-18 =

Star in the constellation Phoenix

Observation data Epoch J2000.0 Equinox ICRS
- Constellation: Phoenix
- Right ascension: 01^{h} 37^{m} 25.03328^{s}
- Declination: −45° 40′ 40.3747″
- Apparent magnitude (V): 9.273

Characteristics
- Evolutionary stage: main sequence
- Spectral type: F6IV/V + M6.5V

Astrometry
Radial velocity (R_{v})	3.47±0.34 km/s
Proper motion (μ)	RA: 25.404(10) mas/yr Dec.: 20.479(11) mas/yr
Parallax (π)	8.1443±0.0116 mas
Distance	400.5 ± 0.6 ly (122.8 ± 0.2 pc)

Details
Mass	1.294+0.063 −0.061 M_{☉}
Radius	1.319+0.061 −0.062 R_{☉}
Luminosity	2.68+0.28 −0.26 L_{☉}
Surface gravity (log g)	4.310+0.036 −0.033 cgs
Temperature	6432±48 K
Metallicity [Fe/H]	0.107±0.080 dex
Rotational velocity (v sin i)	11.9±1.2 km/s
Age	1.57+1.4 −0.94 Gyr

Other designations
- CD−46 449, CPD−46 168, HD 10069, HIP 7562, SAO 215585, PPM 306061, TOI-185, TIC 100100827, WASP-18, TYC 8040-72-1, 2MASS J01372503-4540404

Database references
SIMBAD	A
- B
Exoplanet Archive	data

WASP-18 is a magnitude 9 star located 400 light-years (120 parsecs) away in the constellation Phoenix of the Southern Hemisphere. It has a mass of 1.29 solar masses.

The star, although similar to the Sun in terms of overall contents of heavy elements, is depleted in carbon. The carbon to oxygen molar ratio of 0.23±0.05 for WASP-18 is well below the solar ratio of 0.55.

There is a red dwarf companion star at a separation of 3,519 AU.

== Planetary system ==
In 2009, the SuperWASP project announced the discovery of a large, hot Jupiter type exoplanet, WASP-18b, orbiting very close to this star. It has an orbital period of less than a day and a mass 10 times that of Jupiter.

Observations from the Chandra X-ray Observatory failed to find any X-rays coming from WASP-18, and it is thought that this is caused by WASP-18b disrupting the star's magnetic field by causing a reduction in convection in the star's atmosphere. Tidal forces from the planet may also explain the higher amounts of lithium measured in earlier optical studies of WASP-18.

A 2019 study proposed a second candidate planet with a 2-day orbital period based on transit-timing variations, but a 2020 study using data from both TESS and ground-based surveys ruled out the existence of a planet with the proposed properties, setting an upper limit of 10 Earth masses on any planet with this period.

The WASP-18 planetary system
Companion (in order from star)	Mass	Semimajor axis (AU)	Orbital period (days)	Eccentricity	Inclination (°)	Radius
b	10.20±0.35 M_{J}	0.02024+0.00029 −0.00031	0.94145223(24)	0.0051+0.0070 −0.0037	83.5+2.0 −1.6	1.240±0.079 R_{J}
