= HIP 11952 =

Star in the constellation Cetus

Observation data Epoch J2000 Equinox ICRS
- Constellation: Cetus
- Right ascension: 02^{h} 34^{m} 11.04689^{s}
- Declination: −12° 23′ 3.4570″
- Apparent magnitude (V): 9.85

Characteristics
- Spectral type: F2V-IV (Note: The stellar classification for this star is uncertain; please read the cited paper for more information.)
- Apparent magnitude (B): 10.18
- Apparent magnitude (V): 9.85
- Apparent magnitude (J): 8.790
- Apparent magnitude (H): 8.516
- Apparent magnitude (K): 8.457

Astrometry
Radial velocity (R_{v})	23.62 km/s
Proper motion (μ)	RA: +57.27 mas/yr Dec.: −187.74 mas/yr
Parallax (π)	8.93 mas
Distance	376.1 ly (115.3 pc)

Details
Mass	0.83±0.05 M_{☉}
Radius	1.6±0.1 R_{☉}
Temperature	6,040±210 K
Metallicity [Fe/H]	−1.95±0.09 (Note: This measurement indicates the log_{10} of the relative abundance of iron in the measured star to that of the Sun.) dex
Age	12.8±2.6 Gyr

Other designations
- LP 710-89, BD−13°482, HD 16031, HIP 11952, NLTT 8361, PPM 211702, SAO 148474, TYC 5288-192-1

Database references
SIMBAD	data

HIP 11952 is a star in the Milky Way galaxy, located 375 light-years away from the Sun. While the spectral lines strongly indicate that the star is of spectral type F2V-IV, previous analyses have stated that the star is a G8III giant star and an F0V main-sequence star. Located in the constellation Cetus, the star has a metallicity only 1% that of the Sun. It has reached the end of its lifetime on the main sequence, and is likely to be a subgiant.

== Claims of planet detection ==
In 2012 it was announced that HIP 11952 had two giant planets, this would have made it the oldest and most metal-poor planet host star known. This would have posed a challenge to planetary formation, as the chances of a planet forming so early in the Universe's history, with such a small amount of heavy elements with which to form planets, are believed to be remote.

Further measurements of HIP 11952 were made on 35 nights over about 150 days, from August 7, 2012, to January 6, 2013, using the newly installed high resolution spectrograph HARPS-N at the 3.58m Telescopio Nazionale Galileo telescope on La Palma Island (Canary Islands) and HARPS at the European Southern Observatory's 3.6m telescope on La Silla (Chile). Following their analysis, they were able to confidently exclude, through non-detection, the presence of the two giant planets with periods of 6.95 ± 0.01 days and 290.0 ± 16. 2 days. They also reasoned that the previously mistaken detections were probably due to instrument measurement errors. Re-analysis of the FEROS data revealed a problem with the barycentric correction used to derive the radial velocities; this error had led to the erroneous detection claim.

== See also ==
- Population II star
