= Lower limit =

Lower limit may refer to:

- Limit inferior
- Confidence interval
- One-sided limit
- Minimum
