= HH 1177 =

Herbig-Haro object in Large Magellanic Cloud

Molecular cloud
- Herbig-Haro object
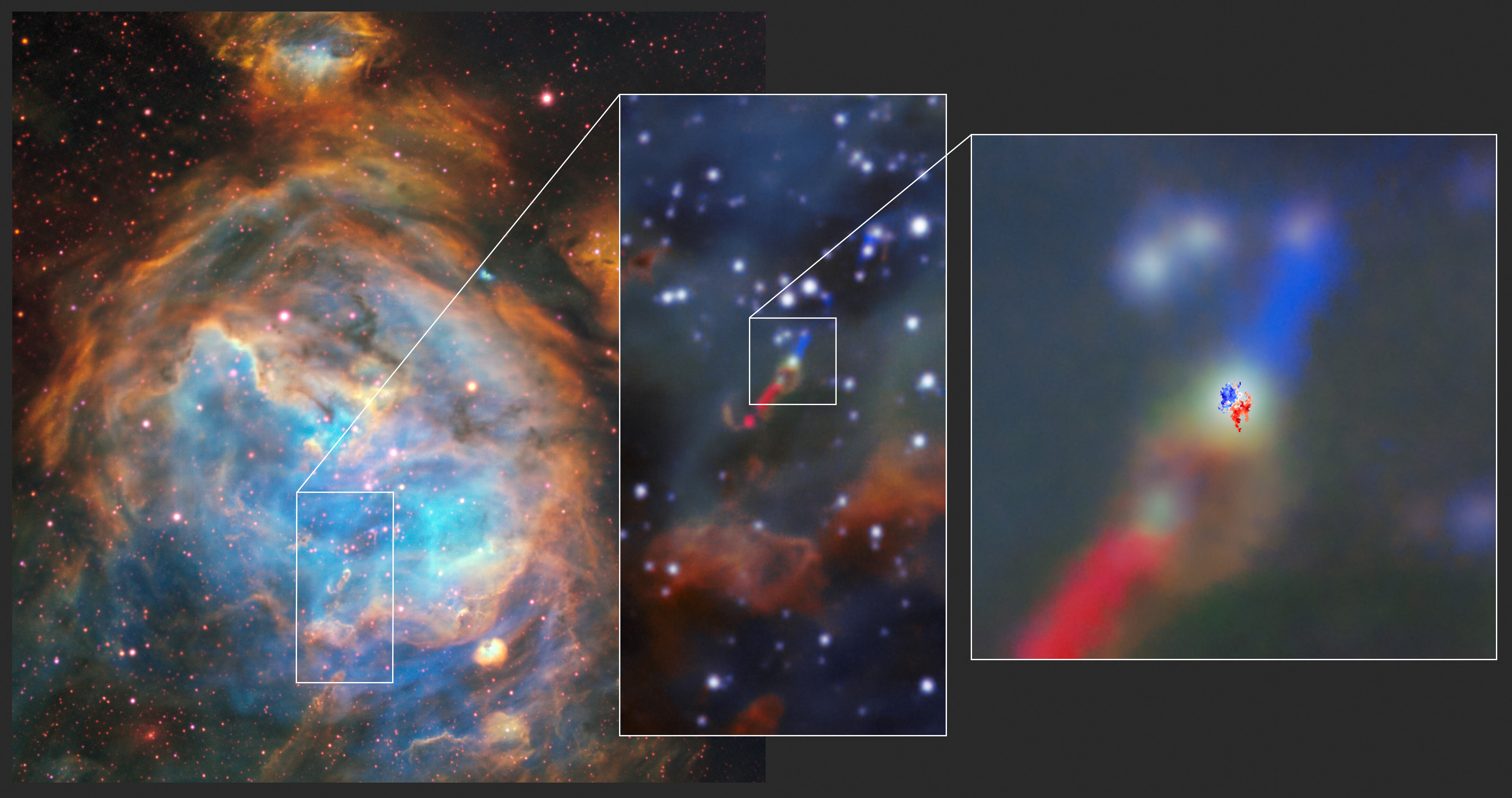
- The disc and jet in the HH 1177 system as seen with MUSE and ALMA

Observation data: J2000.0 epoch
- Right ascension: 05^{h} 49^{m} 2.30^{s}
- Declination: −70° 05′ 25.0″
- Distance: 163,000 ly
- Constellation: Mensa

HH 1177 is a Herbig–Haro object located within emission nebula NGC 2122 in the Large Magellanic Cloud. It is a jet from a massive young B-type star. It has a mass of around 15 M_{☉}. It is the first star outside the Milky Way observed to be surrounded by an accretion disk, whose radius is ~6000 AU. The presence of the disk is inferred from the behaviour of massive jets originating from the star, which were detected for first time in 2018.

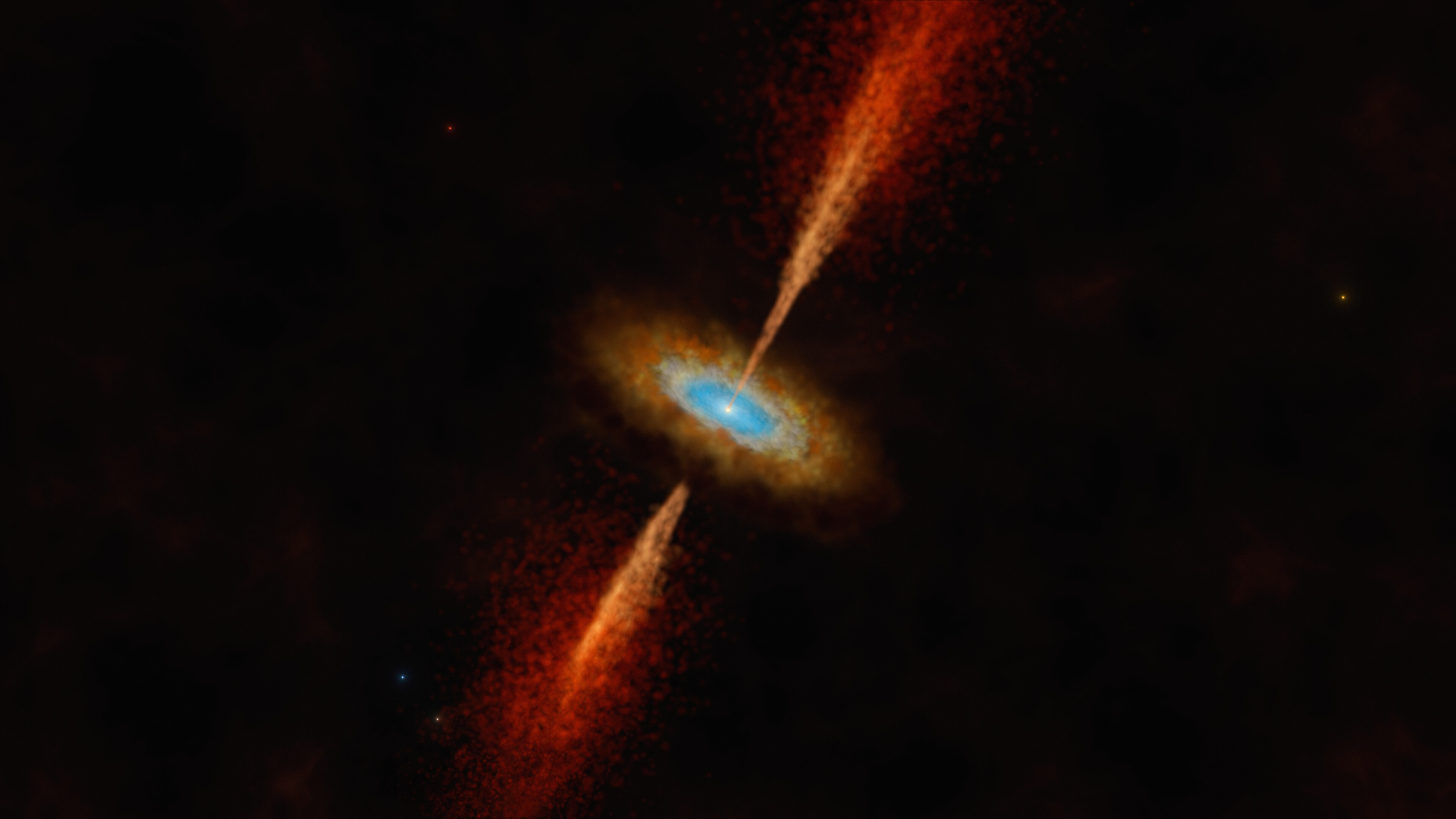
Artistic representation of HH 1177

== See also ==
- HD 37974, also circled by a dust disk
