= Gliese 900 =

Hierarchical triple star system in the constellation Pisces

- Location on Gliese 900 (circled in red)

Observation data Epoch J2000 Equinox J2000
- Constellation: Pisces
- Right ascension: 23^{h} 35^{m} 00.27674^{s}
- Declination: +01° 36′ 19.4347″
- Apparent magnitude (V): 9.546

Characteristics

A
- Evolutionary stage: Main sequence
- Spectral type: K5-7
- B−V color index: 1.35

B
- Evolutionary stage: Main sequence
- Spectral type: M3-4

C
- Evolutionary stage: Main sequence
- Spectral type: M5-6

Astrometry
Radial velocity (R_{v})	−10.44±0.44 km/s
Proper motion (μ)	RA: 340.029 mas/yr Dec.: 28.456 mas/yr
Parallax (π)	47.9641±0.0236 mas
Distance	68.00 ± 0.03 ly (20.85 ± 0.01 pc)
Absolute magnitude (M_{V})	7.95 (Note: Using the apparent magnitude and distance from Earth, Gliese 900's absolute magnitude can be calculated. 9.546+5−5*log(20.85) = 7.95.)

Orbit
Primary	A
Name	BC
Period (P)	≈80 yr

Orbit
Primary	B
Name	C
Period (P)	36.0+1.5 −1.4 yr
Semi-major axis (a)	444+12 −10 mas (9.217 AU) (Note: Using the angular separation and the parallax (both in milliarcseconds), the physical separation (in AU) can be obtained. 444/48.17 = 9.217 AU.)
Eccentricity (e)	0.136+0.026 −0.025
Inclination (i)	82.21±0.23°
Longitude of the node (Ω)	8.01±0.33°
Periastron epoch (T)	54,494.00+222.00 −237.00 MJD
Argument of periastron (ω) (secondary)	109.8+7.7 −8.5°

Position (relative to A)
Epoch of observation	December 2006
Angular distance	751 (A–B); 708 (A–C); 51 (B–C) mas
Position angle	342.5 (A–B); 344.7 (A–C); 130.3 (B–C)°

Details

A
Mass	0.64 – 0.67 M_{☉}
Radius	0.716±0.021 R_{☉}
Luminosity	0.12±0.005 L_{☉}
Temperature	4,079±180 K
Metallicity [Fe/H]	+0.03 dex
Rotation	11.9 days
Age	200±50 Myr

B
Mass	0.28 – 0.34 M_{☉}
Metallicity [Fe/H]	+0.03 dex
Age	200±50 Myr

C
Mass	0.16 – 0.24 M_{☉}
Metallicity [Fe/H]	+0.03 dex
Age	200±50 Myr

Other designations
- BD+00 5017, GJ 900, HIP 116384, WDS J23350+0136A,BC, G 29-47 / 157-46, LSPM J2235+0136, TIC 422618003, TYC 585-236-1, GSC 00585-00236, 2MASS J23350028+0136193, WISE J233500.50+013619.7

Database references
SIMBAD	data
Exoplanet Archive	data

Gliese 900 (GJ 900, BD+00 5017) is a triple star system, located 68 light-years from Earth in the constellation Pisces. It is made up of three main sequence stars: one is a K-type star, the two others are M-dwarf stars. The two M-dwarfs form a binary system with a period of 36 years, and this system has a period of 80 years around the primary component. With an apparent magnitude of 9.546, Gliese 900 is not visible to the naked eye. A widely separated planet has been detected around the system.

== Stellar system ==
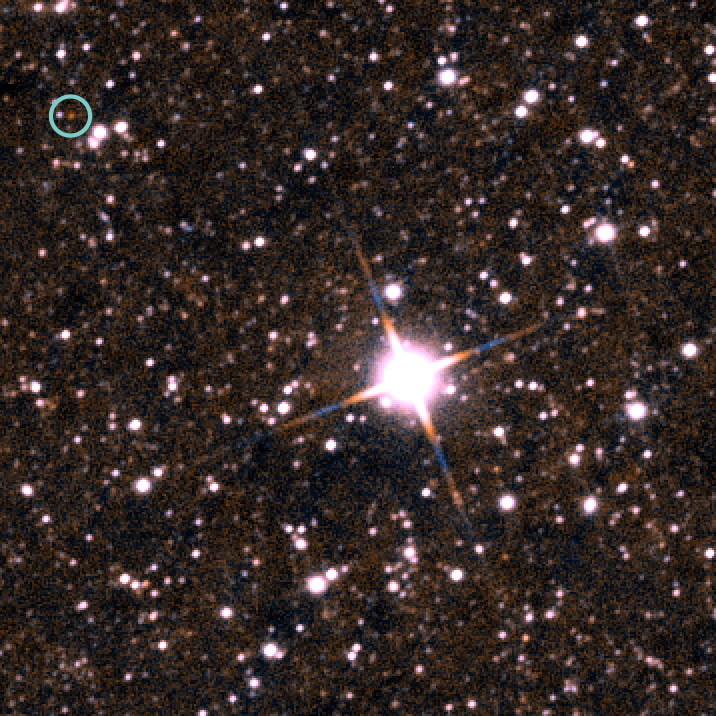
Gliese 900 imaged by WISE, with the planetary-mass companion circled

Gliese 900 is a hierarchical star system, made up of three main sequence stars: The primary component (Gliese 900 A) is a K5-K7 type star, that has 0.64–0.67 times the mass of the Sun, 0.72 times its radius, and 12% its luminosity. A light curve from the Transiting Exoplanet Survey Satellite (TESS) shows that its rotational period is 12 days. Gliese 900 A has a high level of chromospheric and coronal activity, although its apparent brightness presents little variation. The other components are red dwarf stars. Gliese 900 B has a spectral type of M3–M4 and a mass between 0.24 and 0.34 solar masses. Gliese 900 C has a spectral type of M5–M6 and a mass between 0.16 and 0.24 solar masses.

The system is young, about 200 million years old, and is a likely member (99.7% probability) of the nearby moving group Carina-Near. It is a source of X-ray emission, with an observed flux of 9.13×10^{2} mW M^{-2}, and is also a source of ultraviolet emission. The emission of X-rays is typical of young stars, and classifies it as one. The TESS light curve identifies stellar flares on this star.

=== Orbit ===
Gliese 900 B and C form an inner pair (named Gliese 900 BC) with an orbital period of around 36 years. Gliese 900 BC and Gliese 900 A orbit the system's center of mass with a period of 80 years. As of November 2004, B was separated from A by 751 milliarcseconds and C was separated from A by 708 mas. This separation changes over time. It was identified as a multiple star system in 2002 by Eduardo L. Martín, using adaptive optics-corrected images at the 8.2 m Subaru Telescope. When first observed, the A–B and A–C separations were of 0.51 and 0.76 arcsecs respectively. A further study by Malogolovets et al. (2007) identified this system as a hierarchical triple.

=== Other stars in the system ===
Malogolovets et al. (2007) reported two other objects in 2MASS images (potentially late red dwarfs) that would be the components D and E and make the system quintuple, being "very likely" to be bound to the system. However, these faint stars have not been confirmed as members of the GJ 900 system, and are likely not associated.

== Motion ==
Gliese 900 is located 68 light-years from Earth, based on parallax measurements by the Gaia spacecraft. The BP-RP spectra suggest a distance of 67.7 ly. The space velocity components of this system are U = −28.7, V = −15 and W = 0.2. Gliese 900 is part of the thin disk population of the Milky Way. It was once classified as part of the IC 2602 supercluster. A newer analysis using kinematics from the Gaia spacecraft suggest that Gliese 900 has a 99.7% chance of being a member of the Carina-Near moving group and a 0.3% chance of being a field star, i.e. not associated to any star cluster or stellar association.

== Planetary system ==
A 2024 study led by Austin Rothermich identified CWISE J233531.55+014219.6 (abbreviated to CW2335+0142) as a proper motion companion to Gliese 900, with 99.5% probability. This object, also called Gliese 900 b or Gliese 900 (ABC)b, is a planetary-mass object that has 10.5 times the mass of Jupiter (0.01 times the mass of the Sun), a spectral type T9 and a temperature of 500 K. It was found to be at an angular separation of 587" from Gliese 900. At the estimated distance to this system, it translates to a projected separation of 12,000 AU.

As of 2024, Gliese 900 b has the largest observed separation of any known planet, and assuming a circular orbit, the longest orbital period. (Note: Out of objects with a planetary mass (<13 M_{J}). Exoplanet databases list a few brown dwarfs at larger separations.) The orbital period is estimated at 1.27 million years based on the projected separation. Due to the similar spectral type, orbital separation and age, Gliese 900 b has been compared to COCONUTS-2b by the discovery team.

Also in 2024, a study using data from Wide-field Infrared Survey Explorer found a red W2-W3 color for Gliese 900 b, which the researchers interpret as a sign of low gravity for T-dwarfs. Low gravity is often seen as an indicator of a young age and a low mass.

Gliese 900 planetary system
Companion (in order from star)	Mass	Projected separation (AU)	Orbital period (million years)	Eccentricity	Inclination	Radius
b	10.5 M_{J}	12,000	1.27	–	–	

== See also ==
- Circumtriple planet, a category of planets to which Gliese 900 b belongs
- List of exoplanets discovered in 2024 - including Gliese 900 b
