= COCONUTS-2b =

Gas giant exoplanet orbiting L 34-26

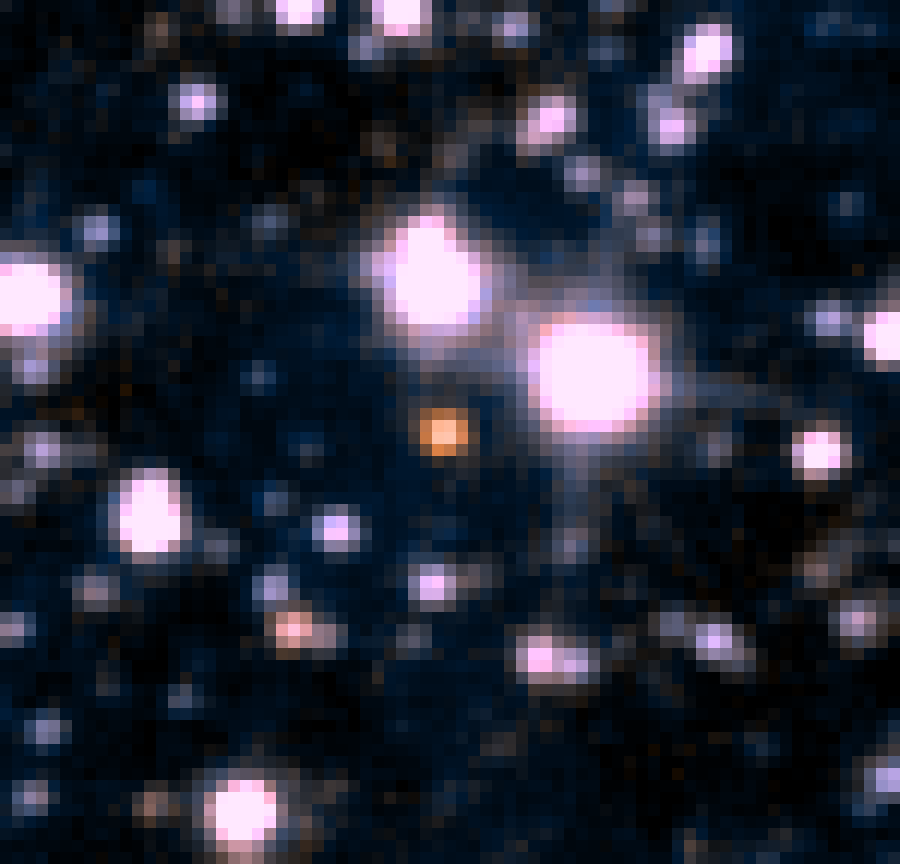
- COCONUTS-2b with unWISE. The planet in the center of the image stands out due to its red color. The host star is not pictured here.

Discovery
- Discovered by: Zhoujian Zhang; Michael Liu; Zach Claytor; William Best; Trent Dupuy; Robert Siverd
- Discovery date: August 2011 (as a free-floating brown dwarf) July 2021 (as a planet)
- Detection method: Direct imaging

Designations
- Alternative names: WISEPA J075108.79-763449.6

Orbital characteristics
- Semi-major axis: 7,500+5,200 −2,100 AU (1.1×10^{12} km)
- Orbital period (sidereal): 1.1+1.3 −0.4×10^{6} years
- Star: L 34-26

Physical characteristics
- Mean radius: 1.03+0.01 −0.02 R_{J} 1.133+0.005 −0.006 R_{J} 1.160+0.002 −0.003 R_{J}
- Mass: 7.3±0.3 M_{J}
- Surface gravity: log(g) = 4.30+0.04 −0.02 cgs
- Temperature: 468.1±1.1 K 471.3+1.6 −1.4 K 496+5 −3 K
- Spectral type: T9.5±0.5

COCONUTS-2 b is a gas giant exoplanet that orbits the M-type star L 34-26. With a mass of 7.3 Jupiters, it takes over one million years to complete one orbit around the star orbiting 7,500 AU away from it.

The planet was discovered in 2011 and was initially identified as a T9 free-floating brown dwarf WISEPA J075108.79−763449.6. During the COol Companions ON Ultrawide orbiTS (COCONUTS) survey, its association with L 34-26 was announced in 2021. At a distance of 35.5 light-years (10.9 parsecs), COCONUTS-2b was the closest directly imaged exoplanet to Earth until Epsilon Indi Ab was imaged in 2024.

== Proposed formation scenarios ==
The researchers found that it is unlikely that COCONUTS-2b was formed inside the protoplanetary disk of the host star and may instead have formed separately.

The peculiar properties of COCONUTS-2b could be explained with different scenarios as proposed by Marocco et al. in 2024. The properties could be explained by a non-solar carbon-to-oxygen ratio, meaning that it formed inside a disk around L 34–26. In this scenario the most likely way COCONUTS-2b got in a higher orbit is by a stellar fly-by of two binaries or two planetary systems. In the second scenario L 34-26 is not actually young, but mimics youth due to tidal and/or magnetic interactions with an unseen companion. In this scenario COCONUTS-2b would be an old brown dwarf. In a third scenario COCONUTS-2b could be a captured old brown dwarf. This is however seen as unlikely due to the stellar fly-by requiring a low velocity.

Another study in 2024 found that the metallicity of the planet is lower than that of the host star, which is inconsistent with it forming on its current location, like a binary system. Only their third-preferred model is consistent with a binary-like formation, because in this model the metallicity of host star and planet agreed.

== Atmosphere ==
The planet's spectral type suggests high amounts of methane, water vapor and low amounts of carbon monoxide in the atmosphere of COCONUTS-2b. It might also have both clouds and a non-equilibrium process in its atmosphere.

Due to its large orbital separation, COCONUTS-2b is a great laboratory to study the atmosphere and composition of young gas-giant exoplanets. The planet's temperature is estimated at 496 K (223 °C; 433 °F).

Observations with Gemini/Flamingos-2 showed a spectral type of T9.5±0.5, near the T/Y transition. The spectrum is also more consistent with disequilibrium chemistry and the presence of clouds. Additionally the atmosphere shows a diabatic thermal structure, meaning the pressure-temperature profile is non-adiabatic. Adiabatic means here an increase of the temperature with pressure. The observation also indicate a sub- or near-solar metallicity.

== Host star ==
L 34-26
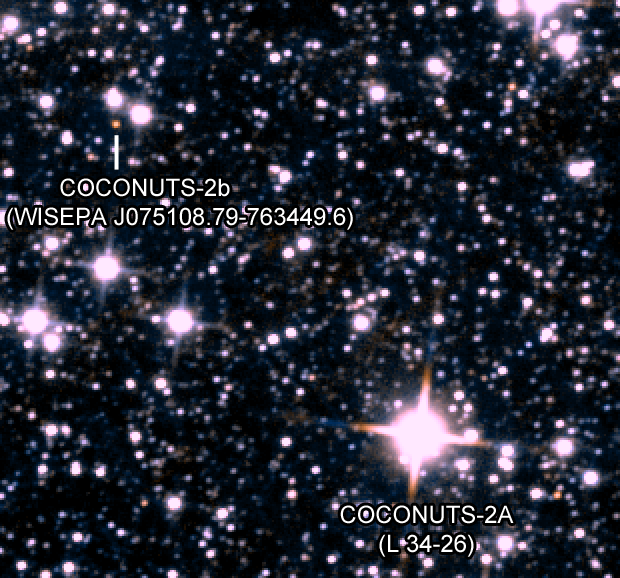
- L 34-26 (COCONUTS-2A) and its planetary companion in unWISE

Observation data Epoch J2000.0 Equinox ICRS
- Constellation: Chamaeleon
- Right ascension: 07^{h} 49^{m} 12.678^{s}
- Declination: −76° 42′ 06.72″
- Apparent magnitude (V): 11.3

Characteristics
- Evolutionary stage: Red dwarf
- Spectral type: M3V

Astrometry
Radial velocity (R_{v})	1.19±0.61 km/s
Proper motion (μ)	RA: −102.154 mas/yr Dec.: −192.918 mas/yr
Parallax (π)	91.8263±0.0185 mas
Distance	35.519 ± 0.007 ly (10.890 ± 0.002 pc)

Details
Mass	0.40+0.01 −0.02 M_{☉}
Radius	0.366+0.015 −0.014 R_{☉}
Surface gravity (log g)	4.91+0.02 −0.01 cgs
Temperature	3,552+65 −32 K
Age	414±23 Myr

Other designations
- L 34-26, COCONUTS-2A, WISEPA J075108.79-763449.6, 1RXS J074912.9-764202, 2MASS J07491271-7642065, NLTT 18592, TIC 272232401, TYC 9381-1809-1, UCAC4 067-006518

Database references
SIMBAD	data

L 34–26, also known as COCONUTS-2A and TYC 9381–1809–1, is a M3-type dwarf star located 35 light-years from Earth, in the constellation of Chamaeleon. The star is about one-third the mass of the Sun, with an age between 150 and 800 million years old.

Researchers using TESS found that L 34-26 showed stellar flares about every 0.48 days. It was the most active planet hosting star in their sample. The team studying the host star also found that L 34-26 is fast rotating with a rotation period of 2.83 days. The planet should not be influenced by the flares, because of the large orbital separation. The star is seen almost equator-on with i = 81.8°±5.8° and is considered to be a member of the Ursa Major corona with a probability of 99%. Being a member of the corona, the age of the star and its planet would be 414±23 million years.

== Gallery ==
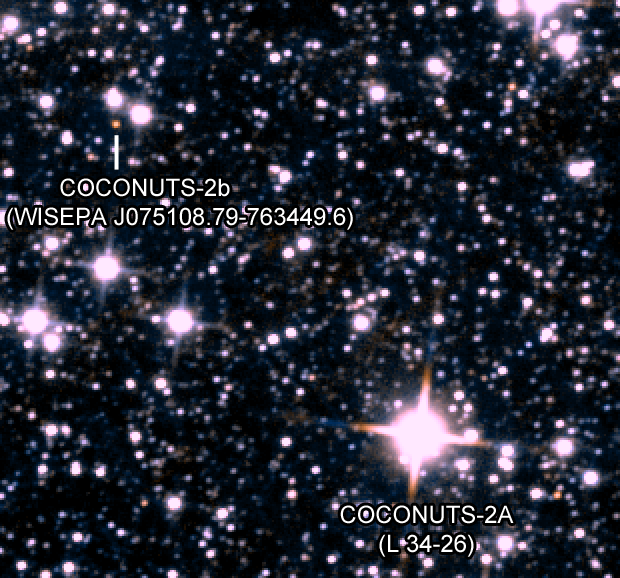
The COCONUTS-2 system with unWISE

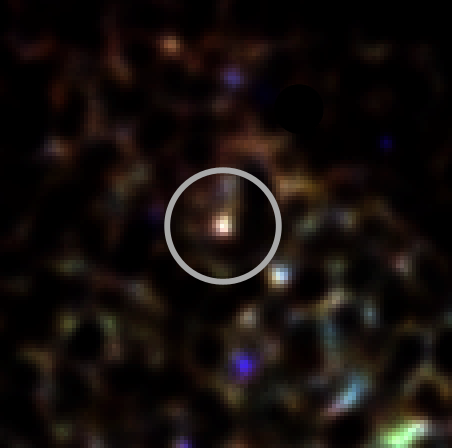
The planet COCONUTS-2b with Gemini-South

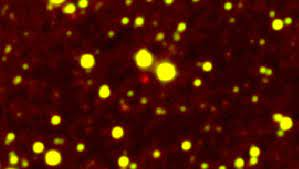
Allwise image by the discoverers, showing planet COCONUTS-2b
