= List of nearby stellar associations and moving groups =

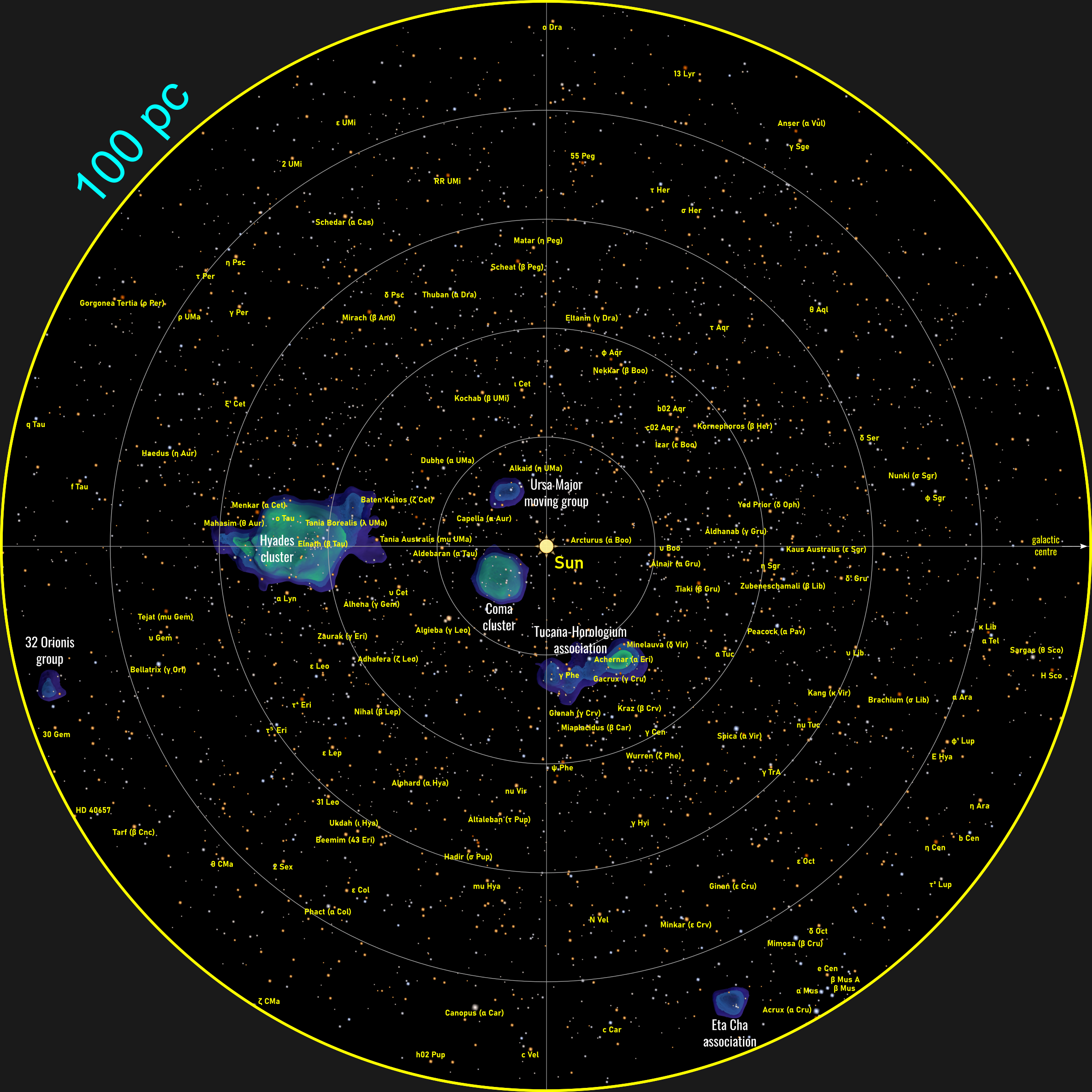
Star density maps of the Gaia Catalogue of Nearby Stars.The Sun is located at the centre of both maps. The regions with higher density of stars are shown; these correspond with known star clusters (Hyades and Coma Berenices) and moving groups.

This is a list of nearby stellar associations and moving groups. A stellar association is a very loose star cluster, looser than an open cluster. A moving group is the remnant of such a stellar association. Members of stellar associations and moving groups share similar kinematic properties, as well as similar ages and chemical composition.

The list (below) is sorted by the distance to the Solar System.

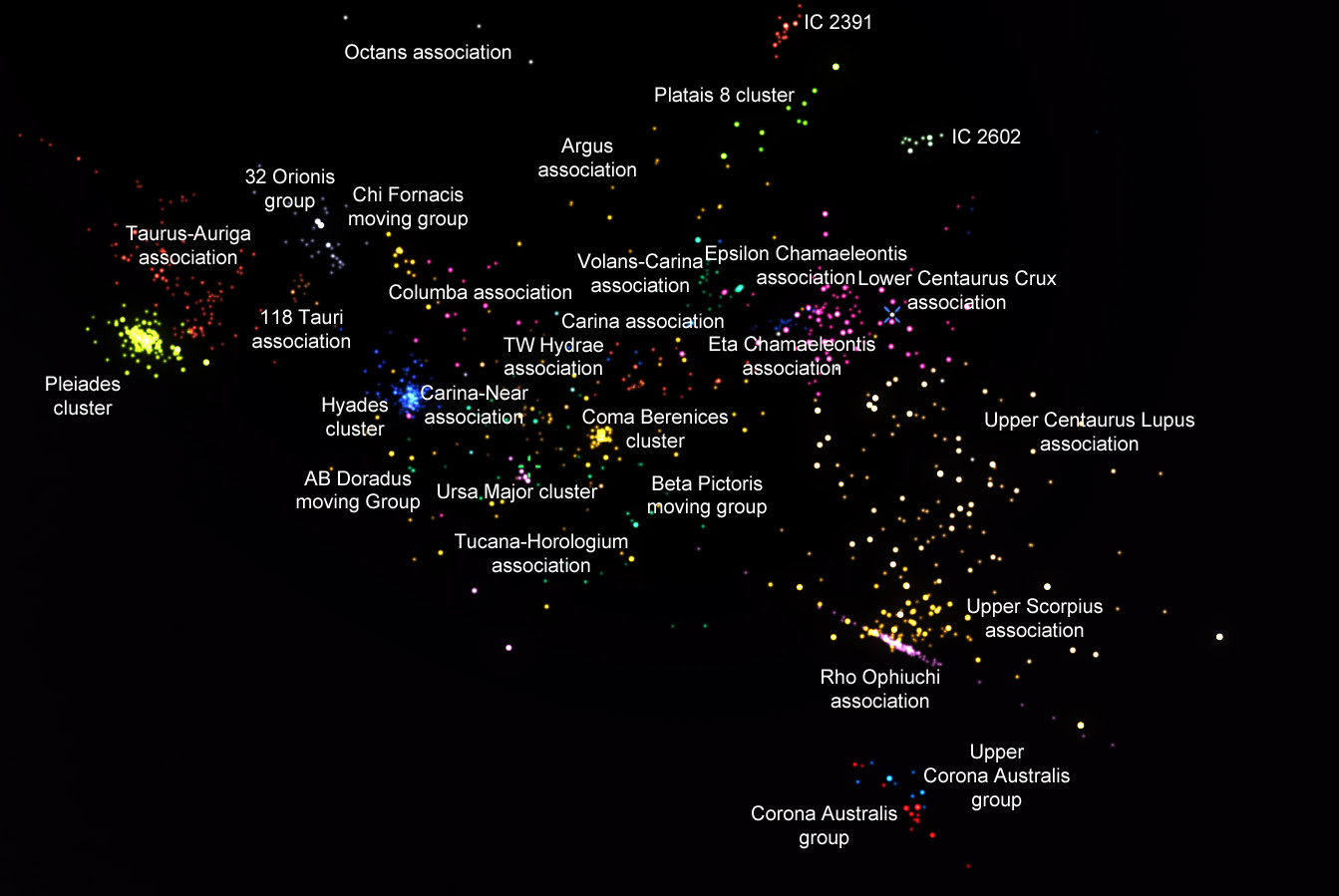
Nearby associations. Most of these are listed below.

Nearby (≤500 light-years) associations and groups
Name	Associated star or cluster	Constellation	Average distance (light-years)	Age (million years)	Note	Reference
Oceanus	Luhman 16		6-160	510	Closest moving group.	
Castor Moving Group	Castor, DX Cancri, Vega, Fomalhaut, etc.		<80		Disputed existence.	
Ursa Major association	Alioth, Mizar, Merak, etc.	Ursa Major	80	414		
AB Doradus moving group	AB Doradus	Dorado	100	150		
β Pictoris moving group	β Pictoris	Pictor	100	24		
Carina-Near moving group		Carina	100	200		
Hercules-Lyra association		Hercules + Lyra	100	260	might be a stellar stream	
Tucana-Horologium association		Tucana + Horologium	150	45	Formerly part of the GAYA (Great Austral Young Association)	
Hyades	Hyades	Taurus	153	750	Closest open cluster. Reported for reference.	
Columba association		Columba	160	42	Formerly part of the GAYA (Great Austral Young Association)	
TW Hydrae association	TW Hydrae	Hydra	160	10		
Carina Association		Carina	200	45	Formerly part of the GAYA (Great Austral Young Association)	
Argus association	IC 2391	Vela + Carina	240	45	May or may not be related to IC 2391	
Coma Star Cluster	Coma Star Cluster	Coma Berenices	280	562	Second closest open cluster. Reported for reference.	
Volans-Carina association		Volans + Carina	280	90	formerly Group 30	
32 Orionis group	32 Orionis	Orion	310	22		
η Chamaeleontis moving group	η Chamaeleontis	Chamaeleon	310	11		
χ^{1} Fornacis moving group	χ1 Fornacis	Fornax	320	40	other name: cluster Alessi 13	
118 Tau association	118 Tauri	Taurus	330	10		
ε Chamaeleontis association	ε Chamaeleontis	Chamaeleon	330	3.7		
Group X		Ursa Major	330	300	proposed moving group; former name is Group 10	
Lower Centaurus–Crux association		Centaurus + Crux	360	15	Subgroup of the Scorpius–Centaurus association	
93 Tau group (formerly Group 29)	93 Tauri	Taurus	380	40	proposed moving group, overlaps with Taurus-Auriga, but is older	
Taurus-Auriga association		Taurus + Auriga	390	1.5	See also: Taurus Molecular Cloud; part of the Radcliffe wave	
Group 26		Cassiopeia	401	<1000	proposed moving group	
Octans association		Octans	420	35		
Upper Centaurus–Lupus association		Centaurus + Lupus	420	16	Subgroup of the Scorpius–Centaurus association	
Upper Scorpius association		Scorpius	420	10	Subgroup of the Scorpius–Centaurus association	
ρ Ophiuchi association	ρ Ophiuchi	Ophiuchus	430	2	See also: Rho Ophiuchi cloud complex	
Pleiades	Pleiades	Taurus	444	112	Third closest open cluster. Reported for reference.	
Corona Australis group		Corona Australis	450	4.5		
Upper Corona Australis group		Corona Australis	480	10		
Platais 8 cluster		Carina	489	60	Open cluster. Reported for reference.	
μ Tau association	μ Eridani, μ Tauri	Taurus	489	60		

== See also ==
- List of stellar streams
- List of open clusters
- List of nearest stars
