= WASP-193b =

Puffy exoplanet in constellation Hydra

Discovery
- Discovered by: Khalid Barkaoui et al.
- Discovery date: July 2023 (announced)
- Detection method: Transit method

Designations
- Alternative names: TYC 6647-516-1 b; TIC 49043968 b; UCAC4 301-065411 b; 2MASS J10572385-2959497 b; TOI-6275 b

Orbital characteristics
- Semi-major axis: 0.0676±0.0015 AU
- Eccentricity: 0.0560+0.0680 −0.0400
- Orbital period (sidereal): 6.2463345(3) d
- Inclination: 88.49°+0.78° −0.49°
- Semi-amplitude: 14.8±3.0 m/s
- Star: WASP-193

Physical characteristics
- Mean radius: 1.319+0.056 −0.048 R_{J}
- Mass: 0.112+0.029 −0.034 M_{J}
- Mean density: 0.060±0.019 g/cm^{3}
- Temperature: 1250+22 −21 K (981 °C; 1,798 °F, equilibrium)

WASP-193b is a hot, transiting gas giant planet located approximately 1,232 light-years (378 pc) away in the constellation of Hydra, orbiting the F-type star WASP-193. Its discovery was made by the WASP-South transit survey and announced in 2023. The planet is extremely bloated, with a radius nearly 50% larger than Jupiter, despite having only 14% of its mass. This places its density at 0.059 g/cm^{3}, the second lowest of any known exoplanet as of May 2024 after Kepler-51d, and comparable to that of cotton candy (about 0.05 g/cm^{3}).

== Discovery ==
The planet was discovered in July 2023 by a team of astronomers led by Khalid Barkaoui, a researcher at the University of Liège, from observational data taken by WASP (Wide Angle Search for Planets) in 2006–2008 and 2011–2012. It is one of hundreds discovered in the WASP mission, which uses transit photometry to find exoplanets, observing the dimming of a star caused by the astronomical transit of planets passing in front of them.

The discovery was subsequently confirmed photometrically by TRAPPIST-South, SPECULOOS-South, and the TESS mission, as well as through spectroscopic observations by HARPS and the CORALIE spectrograph of the Swiss 1.2-metre Leonhard Euler Telescope.

Due to WASP-193b's unusually low mass (and hence a weak gravitational pull) for a planet its size, initial observations failed to detect radial velocity signals in the spectra of WASP-193. Because of this, it took four years to gather sufficient data to determine the existence of a mass signal from the planet.

== Host star ==
The planet orbits a yellow-white main-sequence star named WASP-193. The star has a mass of 1.059+0.067
−0.068 M_{☉}, a radius of 1.239±0.028 R_{☉}, and a luminosity of 1.87+0.18
−0.16 L_{☉}. It has a surface temperature of 6,078 K (5,805 °C; 10,481 °F) and is 4.4±1.9 billion years old. In comparison, the Sun is 4.6 billion years old, has a temperature of 5,772 K (5,499 °C; 9,930 °F) and a spectral type of G2V. The apparent magnitude of the star is 12.134, making it too faint to be seen from Earth by the naked eye, but visible using a 60 mm aperture telescope.

== Physical characteristics ==
=== Orbit ===
The planet revolves around the star at a distance of just 0.0676 AU (10,110,000 km), over five times closer than Mercury is to the Sun (0.3871 AU). As a result, WASP-193b receives approximately 410 times more irradiance than the solar constant (i.e., the amount of energy received from the sun per given area at a distance of 1 AU), placing its equilibrium temperature at a smoldering 1,254 K (981 °C; 1,798 °F), hot enough to melt silver. (Note: Elemental silver melts at 961.78 °C (1,234.93 K; 1,763.20 °F).) Due to its exposure to intense stellar radiation, the upper layers of the planet's atmosphere are being stripped away at a rate of 1.8×10^{10} – 4.3×10^{11} g per second, depending on the level of extreme ultraviolet flux.

=== Size and density ===
WASP-193b has a radius of 1.464 R_{J} (104664 km; 16.41 R_{🜨}), meaning the planet is approximately 3.1 times more voluminous than Jupiter. (Note: Calculated from radius assuming a perfect non-oblate sphere, that is the cube of the planetary radius measured in Jupiter radii (1.464^{3}≈3.138).) Despite its enormous size, the planet only has a mass of 0.139 M_{J} (44.2 M_{🜨}; 2.58 times that of Neptune), making it a super-Neptune, which normally has less than half the radius (5-7 R_{🜨}). Thus, the density of the planet is estimated to be a mere 0.059 g/cm^{3}—well below the typical value seen in gas giants (0.2–2 g/cm^{3}), and less than a tenth that of Saturn (0.687 g/cm^{3}), the least dense planet in the Solar System. As of May 2024, only one other planet, the super-puff planet Kepler-51d (0.046±0.009 g/cm^{3}), is known to have a lower density. Because of this, both planets are often likened to cotton candy (around 0.05 g/cm^{3}) in media coverage.

=== Composition ===
Most of the planet's radius is thought to be taken up by a bloated atmosphere consisting of predominantly hydrogen and helium, but it remains unknown as to how such a large, light planet could exist, which classical models for gas giant evolution fail to explain. Assuming the planet's age to be 4.4 Gyr, a theoretical model published in 2007 regarding the radii of planets aged between 1.0 and 4.5 Gyr with a core mass of 0–10 M_{🜨} calculates its radius to be 0.9–1.1 R_{J}. Another model, published in 2013 and derived from the analysis of 35 exoplanets weighing less than 150 R_{🜨}, gives a value of 0.82±0.14 R_{J}. Calculations using a 2018 model based on data from 286 hot Jupiters with known masses and radii predicts the radius to be 1.1±0.1 R_{J}. All of these models fall well behind the measured value of 1.464 R_{J}, which, according to model calculations, can only be sustained for a few tens of millions of years, far shorter than the age of the host star, hinting at the presence of other previously unaccounted mechanisms at play.

Research into the anomalously light WASP-193b is said to become crucial for understanding the evolution of inflated planets that cannot be explained by ordinary theories for planetary evolution. Due to the large transit depth, extremely low density, and high equilibrium temperature of the planet, it is considered a prime target for transmission photometry observations by the James Webb Space Telescope.

== See also ==
- Other giant planets with similarly low densities:
  - Kepler-51 b, c, d: three Jupiter-sized super-puff planets.
  - WASP-17b, HAT-P-67b: puffy planets that are among the largest exoplanets despite having Saturn-like masses.
