= V1298 Tauri =

Star in the constellation Taurus

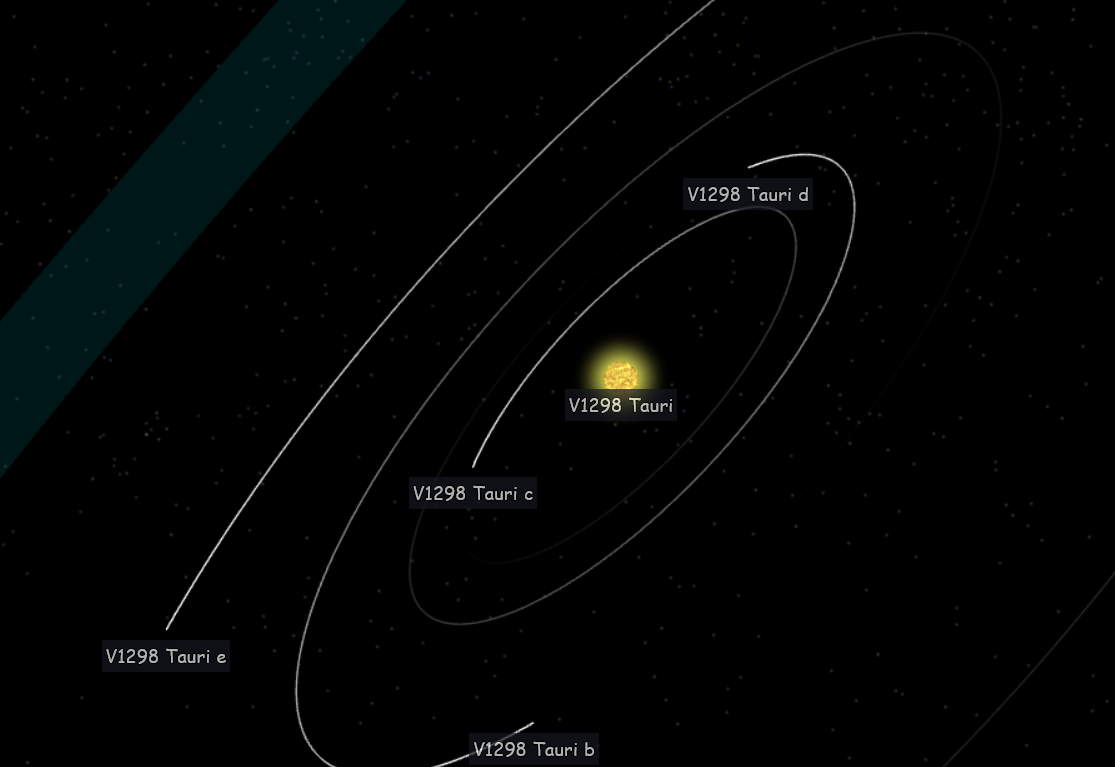
- The planetary system V1298 Tauri; Credit: Exoplanet Exploration Program and the Jet Propulsion Laboratory for NASA’s Astrophysics Division

Observation data Epoch J2000.0 Equinox ICRS
- Constellation: Taurus
- Right ascension: 04^{h} 05^{m} 19.59121^{s}
- Declination: +20° 09′ 25.5635″
- Apparent magnitude (V): 10.31 - 10.43

Characteristics
- Evolutionary stage: pre-main sequence
- Spectral type: K0-K1.5
- Variable type: Irregular

Astrometry
Proper motion (μ)	RA: +5.228±0.131 mas/yr Dec.: −16.077±0.048 mas/yr
Parallax (π)	9.2139±0.0593 mas
Distance	354 ± 2 ly (108.5 ± 0.7 pc)

Details
Mass	1.095+0.049 −0.047 M_{☉}
Radius	1.33+0.04 −0.03 R_{☉}
Luminosity	0.934±0.044 L_{☉}
Surface gravity (log g)	4.43 cgs
Temperature	4,970±120 K
Rotation	2.97+0.03 −0.04 d
Rotational velocity (v sin i)	26.6 km/s
Age	23±4 Myr

Other designations
- K2-309, 2MASS J04051959+2009256, BD+19 656, EPIC 210818897, RX J0405.3+2009, 1SWASP J040519.59+200925.5

Database references
SIMBAD	data
Exoplanet Archive	data

V1298 Tauri is a young (23±4 Myr) weakly-lined T Tauri star that is part of the Taurus-Auriga association in the Taurus Molecular Cloud. Alternatively it is part of a proposed moving group, called Group 29 (or 93 Tau group) that is slightly older. The system has four transiting exoplanets, discovered with the Kepler space telescope in the K2 mission. One of the planets was discovered in August 2019 and the other three were discovered in November 2019 by the same team.

== Stellar characteristics ==
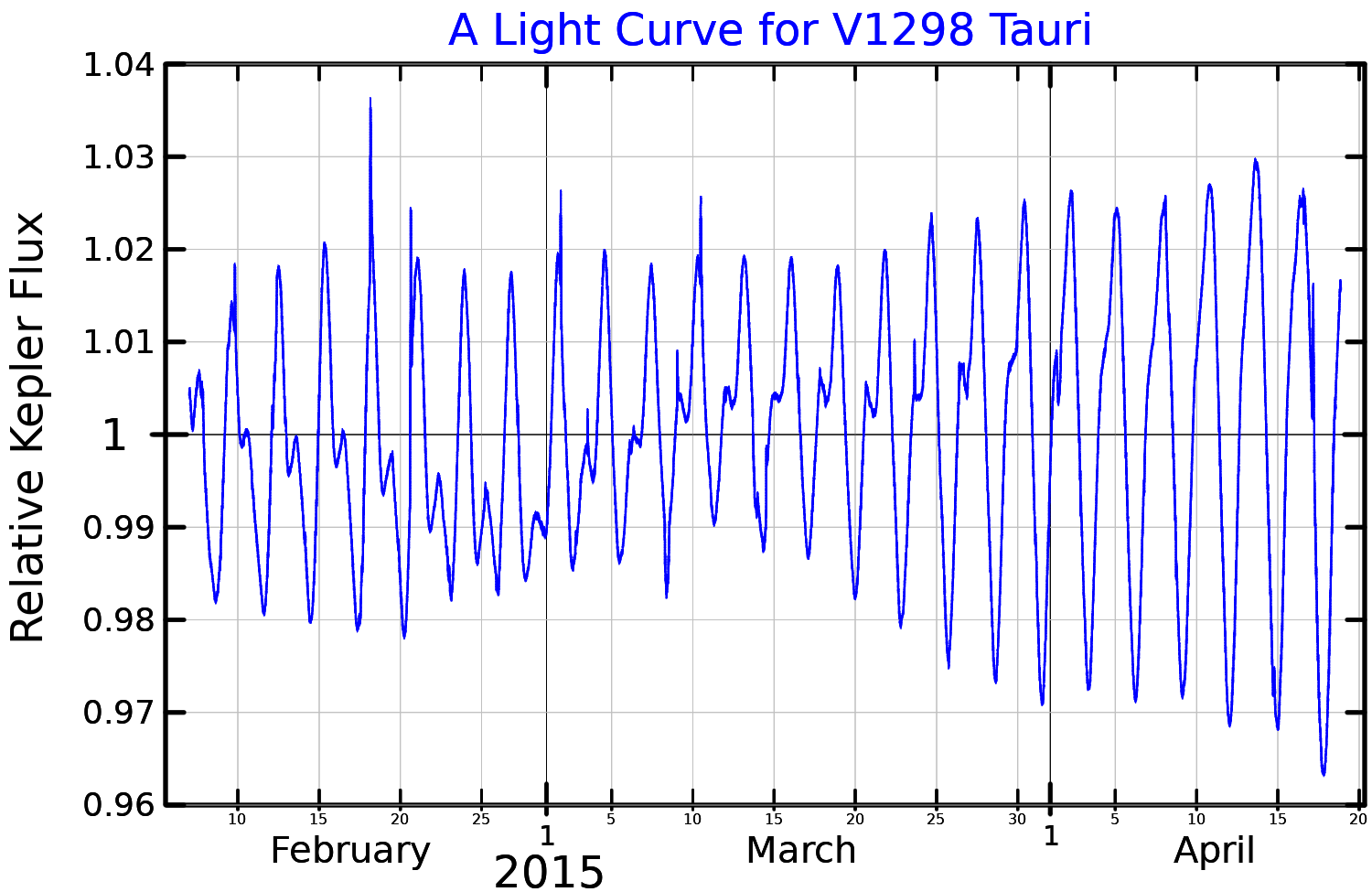
A light curve for V1298 Tauri, adapted from David et al. (2019)

V1298 Tauri has a spectral type of K0 - K1.5 and it has a mass of about 1.1 M_{☉}. The star appears in x-rays from ROSAT data and it does show strong lithium absorption lines, both signatures of youth and therefore it was a proposed member of Taurus-Auriga. On the other hand it does not show signs of accretion and it lacks infrared excess. Instead it shows H-alpha in absorption.

In 2007, Konstantin Nikolaevich Grankin et al. announced their discovery that V1298 Tauri is a variable star. It was given its variable star designation in 2011. The brightness of V1298 Tauri varies in an unpredictable way between a maximum visual magnitude of 10.31 and a minimum of 10.54. The light curve of the star shows quasi-periodic variability that was interpreted as stellar rotation and starspots. The light curve also showed several flares.

Based on Gaia DR2 data this star is part of a co-moving pair, together with HD 284154. The star is included in an analysis of the 93 Tau group, which finds an age of 35±5 Myr.

== Planetary system ==
The planets around V1298 Tauri are super-puffs with some of the lowest densities ever recorded, which is attributed to their young age. Over time the planets will shrink and become super-Earths and sub-Neptunes. Additionally planet c is suspected to have a ‘boil-off’ phase when the disk around the star disperses.

V1298 Tauri has four confirmed planets of which planets c, d and b are near a 2:3:6:12 resonance (with periods of 8.25, 12.40 24.14, and 48.68 days). The system is very young and might be a precursor of a compact multiplanet system. The 2:3 resonance suggests that some close-in planets may either form in resonances or evolve into them on timescales of less than 10 Myr. The planets c, d in the system have a size between Neptune and Saturn. Planets b, e have sizes similar to Jupiter. Planet e was recovered and detected with K2, LCO, TESS and possibly CHEOPS. It has an orbital period of 48.7 days and it has a 2:1 commensurability with planet b, which shows large TTVs due to the interaction. Orbits of the planets b and c are nearly coplanar and planet c is not inclined to the equatorial plane of the star, misalignment equals to 2^{+12}_{−4} degrees.

Models predict that the planets have a minimum core mass of 5 M_{🜨} and are surrounded by a thick envelope that make up 20% of their mass. The total mass of planet c and d was predicted to be 2 - 28 M_{🜨} and the total mass of planet d and b was predicted to be 9 - 120 M_{🜨}. In a follow-up paper the mass of V1298 Tauri b was constrained to <2.2 M_{J}. The masses were measured with transit timing variations (TTVs) and are in the range of super-Earths to sub-Neptunes.

The planet c was suspected to be shedding mass due to intense irradiation by the host star, but hydrogen tail existence was refuted by 2021. Additionally planet c has a non-detection of helium, which provided limits for mass-loss rates. A Hubble WFC3 transmission spectrum was obtained for planet c and hazes could not be ruled out for planet c. Planet e could be a planet with a water-rich core and a substantial hydrogen envelope.

Carbon disulfide is detected in planet e's atmosphere by JWST spectroscopy, consistent with a model with low metallicity, carbon-to-oxygen ratio higher than the Sun, and a relatively cool internal temperature of 303 ± 72 K. This constrasts it with neighbouring planet b, which shows sulfur dioxide instead but has otherwise similar characteristics.

=== Planet b ===
Planet b was observed with Hubble WFC3 and a transmission spectrum was produced. This observation found a clear primordial atmosphere and water vapor absorption. The mass was constrained from this observation to less than 23 earth-masses, making this planet one of the lowest density planet observed. The team retrieved a low metallicity for the atmosphere, challenging formation mechanisms. The planet will likely evolve into a sub-Neptune in the future. An additional study found that planet b has a large, haze-free envelope. A research team studied planet b with JWST NIRSpec and Hubble WFC3 transmission spectroscopy. The team found a haze-free, H/He-dominated atmosphere with a large scale height of around 1500 km. The team detected carbon dioxide, water vapor, methane, sulfur dioxide and carbonyl sulfide in the atmosphere of the planet. The mass was inferred to be 12 ± 1 M_{🜨} (free retrieval) and 15 ± 1.7 M_{🜨} (grid modelling) using the scale height. The metallicity was found to be low compared to a mature sub-Neptune. Especially methane was found to be lower than equilibrium chemistry. The model requires the planet to have a hot internal temperature of 500 K (227 °C; 440 °F) and vertical mixing, which helps to explain the low methane. This hot internal temperature is higher than expected. The planet might have a deep atmospheric metallicity gradient and mass loss from the atmosphere might enhance the metallicity over time.

The V1298 Tauri planetary system
Companion (in order from star)	Mass	Semimajor axis (AU)	Orbital period (days)	Eccentricity	Inclination (°)	Radius
c	4.7±0.6 M_{🜨}	0.0824±0.0012	8.249164(3)	<0.0094	88.49+0.92 −0.72	4.85±0.17 R_{🜨}
d	6.0±0.7 M_{🜨}	0.1081±0.0016	12.401394(9)	<0.0087	89.04+0.65 −0.73	7.25±0.18 R_{🜨}
b	13.1±5.3 M_{🜨}	0.1685±0.0025	24.140006(17)	0.0079±0.0041	89.00+0.46 −0.24	9.96±0.22 R_{🜨}
e	15.3±4.2 M_{🜨}	0.2689±0.0040	48.677714(53)	<0.0124	89.40+0.26 −0.18	10.17±0.75 R_{🜨}

== See also ==
- List of nearby stellar associations and moving groups
- List of exoplanets discovered in 2019
- Kepler-223 - the first confirmed system with four exoplanets in resonance
- K2-138 - a system with five exoplanets in a 3:2 resonance chain
- HD 110067 - a system with seven planets in orbital resonance
- Kepler-51 - another young system with at least three super-puff planets
