= HAT-P-67 =

Binary star system

Observation data Epoch J2000 Equinox J2000
| Constellation | Hercules |
- HAT-P-67A
| Right ascension | 17^{h} 06^{m} 26.5608^{s} |
| Declination | +44° 46′ 37.068″ |
- Apparent magnitude (V): 10.069(16)
- HAT-P-67B
| Right ascension | 17^{h} 06^{m} 26.2261^{s} |
| Declination | +44° 46′ 45.446″ |

Characteristics
- Spectral type: F5IV
- Apparent magnitude (J): 9.145(21)
- Apparent magnitude (H): 8.961(19)
- Apparent magnitude (K): 8.900(19)
- Variable type: Planetary transit

Astrometry

HAT-P-67A
| Radial velocity (R_{v}) | −2.234(27) km/s |
| Proper motion (μ) | RA: 9.541(11) mas/yr Dec.: −18.251(13) mas/yr |
| Parallax (π) | 2.6869±0.0101 mas |
| Distance | 1,214 ± 5 ly (372 ± 1 pc) |
| Absolute magnitude (M_{V}) | 2.50+0.13 −0.23 |

HAT-P-67B
| Proper motion (μ) | RA: 9.977(56) mas/yr Dec.: −18.370(58) mas/yr |
| Parallax (π) | 2.5831±0.0485 mas |
| Distance | 1,260 ± 20 ly (387 ± 7 pc) |

Details

A
| Mass | 1.73±0.10 M_{☉} |
| Radius | 2.65±0.12 R_{☉} |
| Luminosity | 11.96+0.84 −0.73 L_{☉} |
| Surface gravity (log g) | 3.84±0.03 cgs |
| Temperature | 6640+140 −130 K |
| Metallicity [Fe/H] | 0.14+0.14 −0.12 dex |
| Rotation | 5.40±0.09 days |
| Rotational velocity (v sin i) | 35.8±1.1 km/s |
| Age | 1.46+0.29 −0.26 Gyr |

B
| Mass | 0.576 M_{☉} |
| Radius | 0.678 R_{☉} |
| Luminosity | 0.065 L_{☉} |
| Surface gravity (log g) | 4.48 cgs |
| Temperature | 3600 K |

Position (relative to HAT-P-67A)
| Component | HAT-P-67B |
| Angular distance | 9.09945(6)″ |
| Position angle | 336.98893(40)° |
| Projected separation | 3400 AU |

Other designations
- BD+44 2654, Gaia DR3 1358614983131339392, TOI-2014, TYC 3084-533-1, GSC 03084-00533, 2MASS J17062656+4446371
- HAT-P-67B: Gaia DR3 1358614983131339392

Database references
| SIMBAD | data |

HAT-P-67 is a binary star system, made up of a F-type subgiant and a red dwarf star, which is located about 1,200 light-years away in the constellation Hercules. There is a hot Saturn planet orbiting the primary star, which is named HAT-P-67b.

== Stellar system ==
The stellar system consists of the F class primary star with a red dwarf companion separated by 9 arc-seconds or about 3400 astronomical units. According to measurements taken by the Gaia spacecraft the two stars have nearly identical parallax and proper motions confirming that they are a binary system.

The primary star is a rapidly rotating subgiant star with a radius 2.65 times that of the Sun and a mass 1.64 times that of the Sun.

The secondary star is a red dwarf with a radius 0.68 times that of the Sun and a mass 0.58 times that of the Sun.

== Planetary system ==
There is one known planet orbiting HAT-P-67A. HAT-P-67b is a gas giant planet transiting its parent star every 4.8 days, at an orbital distance of 0.065 astronomical units (9,700,000 km). It is one of the largest and lowest density planets known as of 2024.

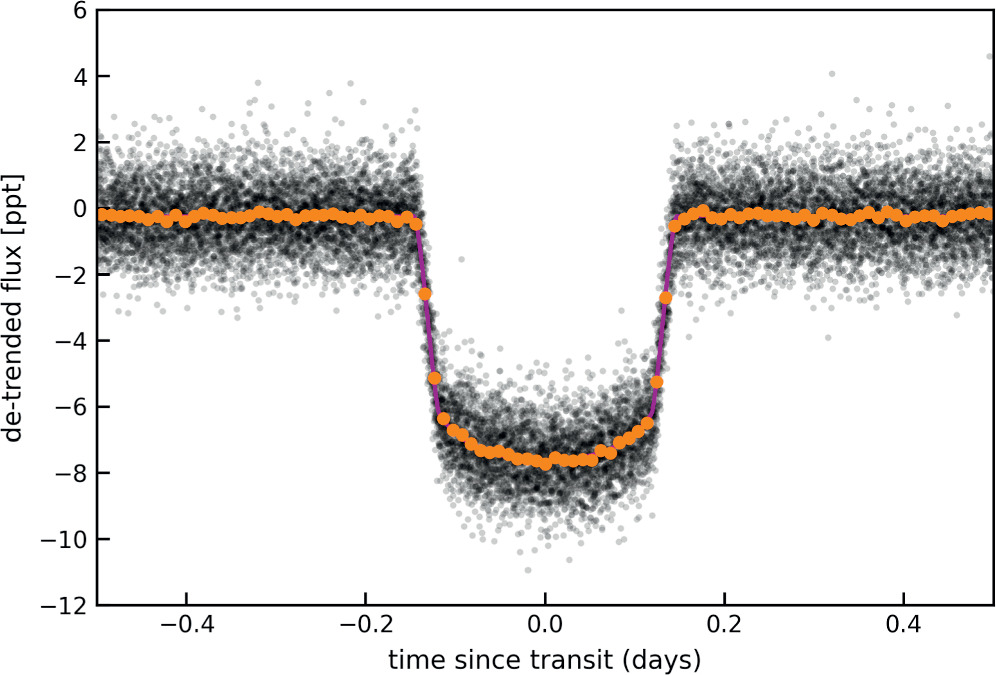
Transit light curve of HAT-P-67b

The HAT-P-67 planetary system
| Companion (in order from star) | Mass | Semimajor axis (AU) | Orbital period (days) | Eccentricity | Inclination | Radius |
|---|---|---|---|---|---|---|
| b | 0.45±0.15 M_{J} | 0.06303 | 4.81010827(58) | 0 (assumed) | 85.01+0.35 −0.32° | 2.140±0.025 R_{J} |
