= Taurus-Auriga association =

One of the nearest large star formation complexes

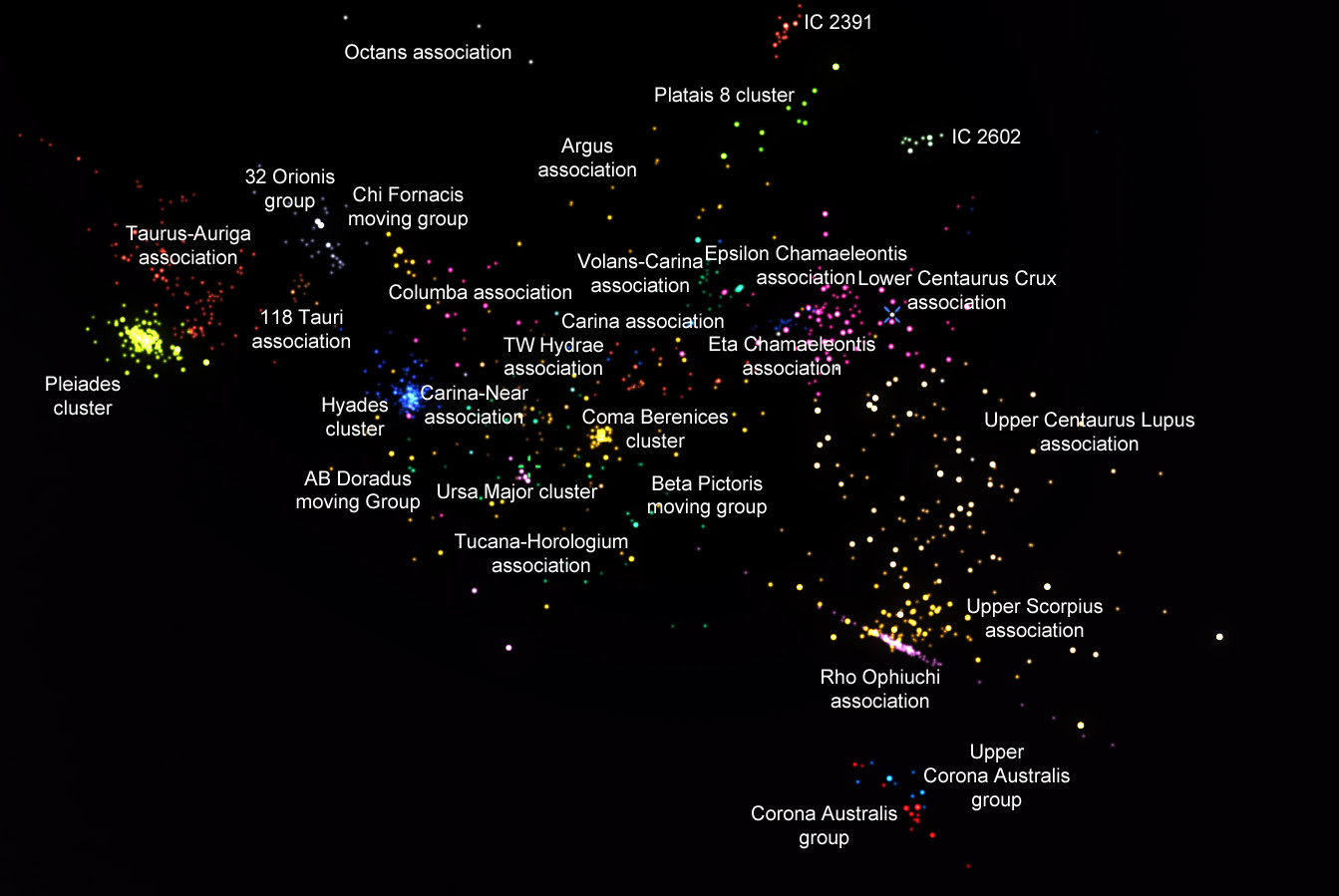
- Image showing the Taurus-Auriga association which is located to the far left of the image in red and next to the Pleiades cluster

Observation data
- Constellation: Taurus
- Mean distance: 420 ly (140 pc)

Physical characteristics
- Other designations: Taurus-Auriga molecular complex (TAMC)

The Taurus-Auriga association, also known as the Taurus-Auriga molecular clouds (TAMC), is a stellar association located at a distance of around 140 parsecs (420 ly) from Earth in the constellation of Taurus. It is the nearest large star formation region (SFR) to Earth. Despite the low and relatively diffused star formation rates of the association, the rate of star formation has been accelerating over the past few million years.

It is adjacent to the Perseus Molecular cloud.

== Stars ==
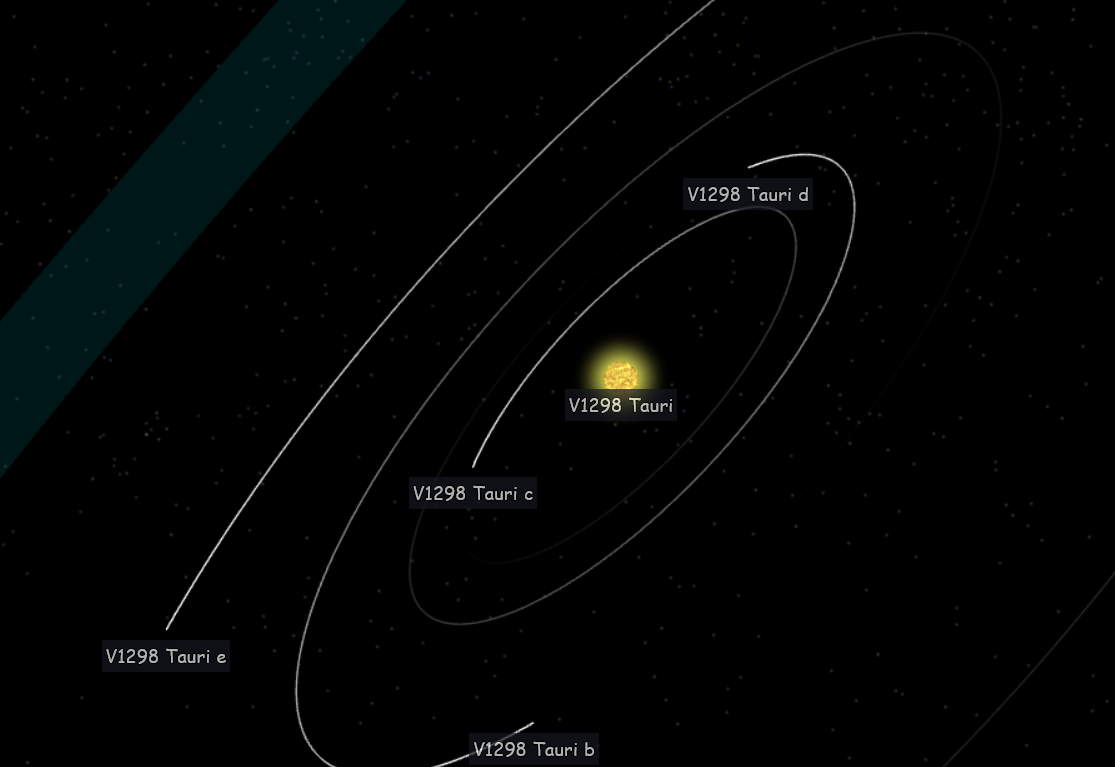
V1298 Tauri is a young K-type T Tauri star located in this association that has four exoplanets orbiting it.

There has been 94 pre-main sequence stars which have been identified to be part of or probable members of the group. The average star in the Taurus-Auriga association are around a million years old and include protostars to T Tauri stars.

Some notable stars include HD 30171, V600 Auriga, 2MASS J04590305+3003004, V1298 Tauri and HD 281691. There are also two M-type stars that are accelerating from the association, 2MASS J04510713+1708468 and 2MASS J05240794+2542438.

The association has no metal-rich stars, reinforcing the idea that old planet host stars form in the inner part of the galactic disk and migrate outward. It also notably lacks stars of intermediate and high mass, but there might have been three B-type stars and two A-type stars detected. The B-type stars are HD 28929, HD 29763, and HD 28149, and the two A-type stars are HD 31305 and HD 26212.

== See also ==
- Taurus molecular cloud
- Orion molecular cloud complex
- Rho Ophiuchi cloud complex
- Perseus molecular cloud
- Cygnus X
- List of nearby stellar associations and moving groups
