= Psi Velorum =

Binary star in the constellation Vela

- Location of ψ Velorum

Observation data Epoch J2000.0 Equinox J2000.0 (ICRS)
- Constellation: Vela
- Right ascension: 09^{h} 30^{m} 41.99958^{s}
- Declination: −40° 28′ 00.2616″
- Apparent magnitude (V): +3.58 (3.91 + 5.12)

Characteristics
- Evolutionary stage: Main sequence
- Spectral type: F0 IV + F3 IV
- U−B color index: +0.00
- B−V color index: +0.36

Astrometry
Radial velocity (R_{v})	+8.8±1.8 km/s
Proper motion (μ)	RA: −147.98 mas/yr Dec.: +61.35 mas/yr
Parallax (π)	53.15±0.37 mas
Distance	61.4 ± 0.4 ly (18.8 ± 0.1 pc)
Absolute magnitude (M_{V})	2.56

Orbit
Period (P)	34.11±0.12 yr
Semi-major axis (a)	0.8110±0.0017″
Eccentricity (e)	0.4375±0.0030
Inclination (i)	58.45±0.15°
Longitude of the node (Ω)	288.24±0.13°
Periastron epoch (T)	2004.062±0.035
Argument of periastron (ω) (secondary)	47.76±0.53°

Details

ψ Vel A
Mass	1.46 M_{☉}
Radius	1.46 (Note: Calculated, using the Stefan-Boltzmann law and the stars' effective temperature and luminosity, with respect to the solar nominal effective temperature of 5,772 K: $$\sqrt{\biggl(\frac{5,772}{6,837}\biggr)^4 \cdot 4.21} = 1.46\ R_\odot.$$ $$\sqrt{\biggl(\frac{5,772}{6,148}\biggr)^4 \cdot 3.05} = 1.54\ R_\odot.$$) R_{☉}
Luminosity	4.21 L_{☉}
Temperature	6,837 K
Metallicity [Fe/H]	0.0±0.2 dex

ψ Vel B
Mass	1.34 M_{☉}
Radius	1.54 R_{☉}
Luminosity	3.05 L_{☉}
Temperature	6,148 K
Metallicity [Fe/H]	0.0±0.2 dex

Other designations
- ψ Vel, CD−39°5580, GJ 351, HD 82434, HIP 46651, HR 3786, SAO 221234, WDS J09307-4028AB

Database references
SIMBAD	ψ Vel
- ψ Vel A
- ψ Vel B
ARICNS	ψ Vel A
- ψ Vel B

Psi Velorum, Latinized from ψ Velorum, is a binary star system in the southern constellation of Vela. Based upon an annual parallax shift of 53.15 mas as seen from Earth, it is located 61.4 light years from the Sun. It is visible to the naked eye with a combined apparent visual magnitude of +3.58. The motion of this system through space makes it a candidate member of the Castor stellar kinematic group.

The two components of this system orbit their common barycenter with a period of 34.11 years and an eccentricity of 0.4375. The semimajor axis of their orbit has an angular size of 0.8110 arc seconds. Psi Velorum A and Psi Velorum B have apparent magnitudes of +3.91 and +5.12 and spectral types F0 IV and F3 IV, suggesting they are F-type subgiants. Analysis of the stars' properties suggest that they are main sequence stars rather than subgiants, and spectral types of F3V + F have also been published. The secondary has been reported to be variable between magnitude 4.5 and 5.1.
