= HD 119124 =

Binary star in the constellation Ursa Major

Observation data Epoch J2000 Equinox ICRS
- Constellation: Ursa Major
- A
- Right ascension: 13^{h} 40^{m} 23.2321^{s}
- Declination: +50° 31′ 09.894″
- Apparent magnitude (V): 6.32
- B
- Right ascension: 13^{h} 40^{m} 24.5187^{s}
- Declination: +50° 30′ 57.569″
- Apparent magnitude (V): 10.51

Characteristics
- Spectral type: F8 V + K7
- U−B color index: −0.01
- B−V color index: +0.52

Astrometry

A
| Radial velocity (R_{v}) | −12.2±0.3 km/s |
| Proper motion (μ) | RA: −125.559 mas/yr Dec.: +58.708 mas/yr |
| Parallax (π) | 39.1793±0.0254 mas |
| Distance | 83.25 ± 0.05 ly (25.52 ± 0.02 pc) |
| Absolute magnitude (M_{V}) | 4.30 |

B
| Proper motion (μ) | RA: −130.953 mas/yr Dec.: +59.421 mas/yr |
| Parallax (π) | 39.2733±0.0165 mas |
| Distance | 83.05 ± 0.03 ly (25.46 ± 0.01 pc) |
| Absolute magnitude (M_{V}) | 8.59 |

Details

A
| Mass | 1.15 M_{☉} |
| Radius | 1.1 R_{☉} |
| Luminosity | 1.5 L_{☉} |
| Surface gravity (log g) | 4.24 cgs |
| Temperature | 6,149 K |
| Metallicity [Fe/H] | −0.18 dex |
| Rotation | 4.42 days |
| Rotational velocity (v sin i) | 10.2 km/s |
| Age | 2.06±22 Gyr |

B
| Mass | 0.63 M_{☉} |
| Radius | 0.6 R_{☉} |
| Luminosity | 0.087 L_{☉} |
| Surface gravity (log g) | 4.52 cgs |
| Temperature | 4,130 K |
| Metallicity [Fe/H] | 0.21 dex |

Other designations
- STF 1774, BD+51°1859, GJ 521.2, GJ 9457, HD 119124, HIP 66704, HR 5148, ADS 8992, CCDM J13404+5031, WDS J13404+5031
- A: SAO 28836
- B: TYC 3469-1423-1, 2MASS J13402450+5030576

Database references
| SIMBAD | data |
- B

HD 119124 is a wide binary star system in the circumpolar constellation of Ursa Major. With an apparent visual magnitude of 6.3, it lies below the normal brightness limit of stars that are visible with the naked eye under most viewing conditions. An annual parallax shift of 39.18 masfor the A component provides a distance estimate of 83 light years. The pair are candidate members of the Castor Moving Group, which implies a relatively youthful age of around 200 million years. HD 119124 is moving closer to the Sun with a radial velocity of −12 km/s.

This system was first identified as a double star by Friedrich von Struve (1793−1864) and catalogued as the 1774th entry in his list. As of 2015, the magnitude 10.5 K-type companion star was located at an angular separation of 18.10 arc seconds along a position angle of 135° from the brighter primary. They appear to be gravitationally bound with an estimated orbital period of around 7,000 years and a linear projected separation of 444.6 AU.

The primary, component A, is a Sun-like star with a stellar classification of F8 V, indicating it is an F-type main-sequence star that is generating energy via hydrogen fusion at its core. It is slightly larger and more massive than the Sun and appears mildly variable. The star is radiating 1.5 times the Sun's luminosity from its photosphere at an effective temperature of 6,149 K.

HD 119124 A displays a strong infrared excess at a wavelength of 70 μm, indicating an orbiting circumstellar disk of cold dust. The emission fits a model with a grain temperature of 40 K, indicating a minimum orbital radius of 60 AU from the host star. The estimated grain lifetimes are 84,000 years – much shorter than the star's lifespan. This suggests the grains are being replenished via collisions between some number of larger bodies totalling around 1−6 times the mass of the Moon.

This system is a likely (80.4% chance) source of the strong X-ray emission coming from these coordinates.
