= Kepler-51 =

Sun-like star in the constellation Cygnus

Observation data Epoch J2000.0 Equinox ICRS
- Constellation: Cygnus
- Right ascension: 19^{h} 45^{m} 55.14^{s}
- Declination: +49° 56′ 15.65″
- Apparent magnitude (V): 15.0

Characteristics
- Evolutionary stage: main sequence
- Spectral type: G4

Astrometry
Radial velocity (R_{v})	−4.3 km/s
Proper motion (μ)	RA: 0.075±0.020 mas/yr Dec.: −7.451±0.019 mas/yr
Parallax (π)	1.2457±0.0165 mas
Distance	2,620 ± 30 ly (800 ± 10 pc)

Details
Mass	0.96±0.02 M_{☉}
Radius	0.87±0.02 R_{☉}
Luminosity	0.69 L_{☉}
Surface gravity (log g)	4.7±0.1 cgs
Temperature	5,670±60 K
Metallicity [Fe/H]	+0.05±0.04 dex
Rotational velocity (v sin i)	5.5±1.0 km/s
Age	500±250 Myr

Other designations
- KOI-620 , KIC 11773022, TIC 27846348, 2MASS J19455514+4956156, WISE J194555.14+495615.6

Database references
SIMBAD	data
Exoplanet Archive	data

Kepler-51 is a Sun-like star that is about 500 million years old. It is orbited by four planets—Kepler-51b, c, d and e—first three of which are super-puffs and have the lowest known densities of any known exoplanet. The transiting planets in the system (b, c and d) are similar in radius to gas giants like Jupiter, but have unusually small masses for their size, only a few times greater than Earth's.

== Properties ==
Kepler-51 is a small G-type star, with a slightly lower radius, mass and effective temperature than the Sun. It is a young star, less than one billion years old, and hence is highly active compared to the Sun. Around 4 to 6% of the star's surface is covered by starspots. Its EUV and X-ray fluxes are likely influencing the chemistry, dynamics and atmospheric mass loss of its planets.

== Planetary system ==
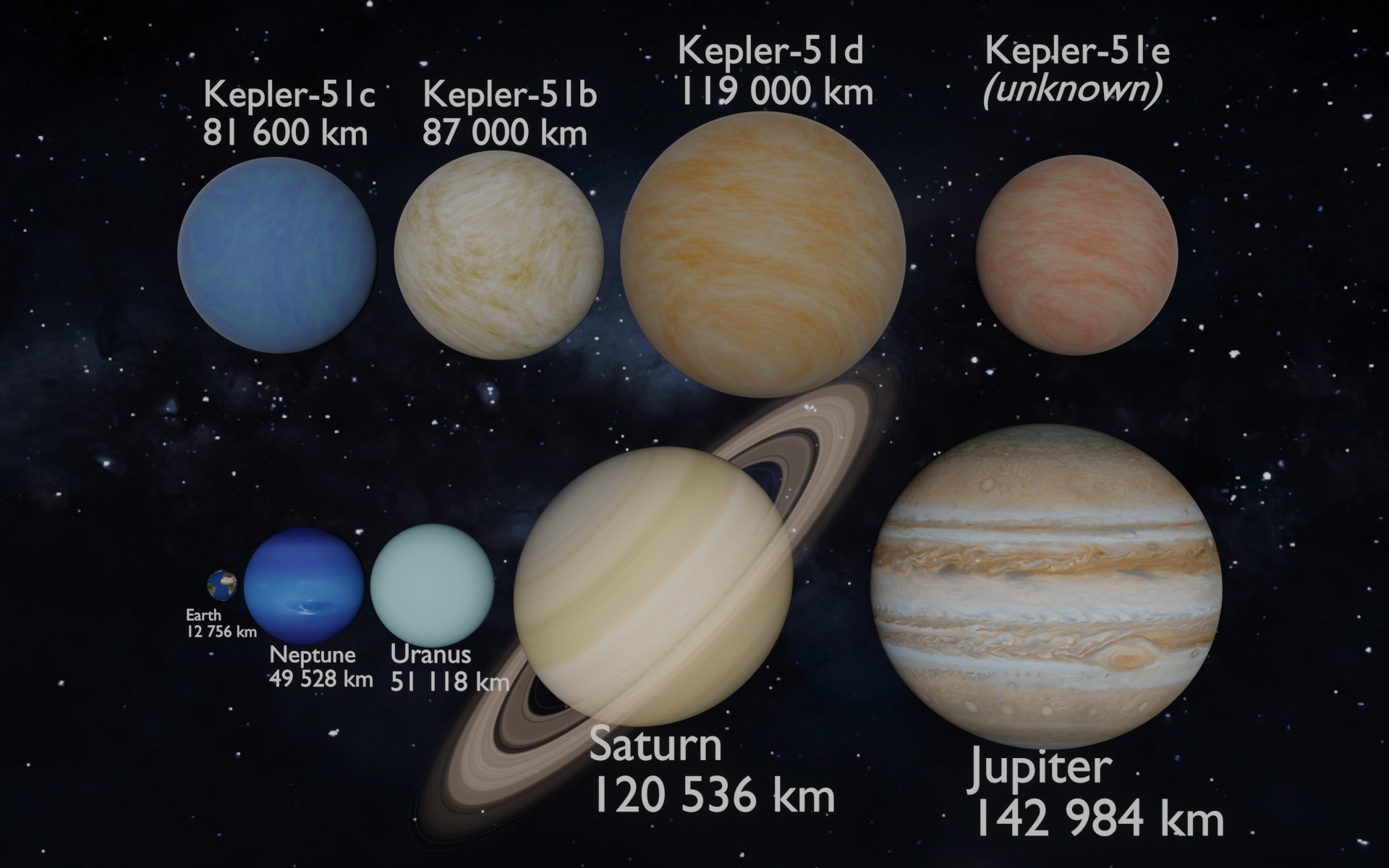
Kepler-51 planets compared to the planets of the Solar System.

Kepler-51 has four planets, discovered between 2013 and 2024. The first planets discovered in the system were Kepler-51 b, c and d, detected by the transit method. The radius of these planets were initially measured using transit data, yielding values of 7.1, 9.0 and 9.7 R_{🜨} respectively, while masses were measured using transit-timing variations, giving masses of 2.1, 4.0 and 7.6 M_{🜨} respectively. These estimates imply very low densities, less than 0.05 g/cm^{3}, one of the lowest of any exoplanets, or 14 times less than Saturn. The low masses were later confirmed in 2020 and 2024, and the densities have been improved to less than 0.14 g/cm^{3}.

Kepler-51 b, c and d are called super-puffs, planets with masses a bit larger than that of Earth, but radii larger than Neptune. The reason for the low density of these planets remains elusive, and many hypotheses have been proposed to explain the nature of these planets, all of which have flaws. In 2024, the Kepler-51 system was revealed to have a new planet, detected using transit timing variations by the James Webb Space Telescope and named Kepler-51e.

The Kepler-51 planetary system
Companion (in order from star)	Mass	Semimajor axis (AU)	Orbital period (days)	Eccentricity	Inclination (°)	Radius
b	3.69+1.86 −1.59 M_{🜨}	0.2514±0.0097	45.15405±0.00039	0.026±0.010	89.78+0.15 −0.17	6.83±0.13 R_{🜨}
c	5.65±0.81 M_{🜨}	0.384±0.015	85.3139±0.0020	0.063±0.020	—	6.4±1.4 R_{🜨}
d	5.6±1.2 M_{🜨}	0.509±0.020	130.182±0.0024	0.01±0.01	89.91+0.06 −0.08	9.32±0.18 R_{🜨}
e	1.6 to 6.1 M_{🜨} or <1 M_{J}	—	256.860±0.631 or <3650	0.08±0.032	—	—

=== Kepler-51b ===
The innermost planet, Kepler-51b, has an orbital period of 45 days. It is 6.8 times larger than Earth and 319 times more voluminous, but its mass is only 3.5 times that of Earth. This translates to a very low density of 0.06 g/cm^{3}, much lower than that of any planet in the Solar System. Given the planet's proximity to its host star, its equilibrium temperature is of 543 K.

Transmission spectroscopy with the Hubble Space Telescope revealed that Kepler-51b has a featureless spectrum, implying that its extended atmosphere has a high photochemical haze layer. Over time, the planet will contract, lose part of its atmosphere and become a sub-Neptune.

=== Kepler-51c ===
Kepler-51c takes 85 days to complete an orbit around its host star, about the same as the planet Mercury. It has 6.4 times Earth's radius (40,770 km) and is 262 times more voluminous, while its mass is only around 5.65 Earth masses. This implies a low density of 0.14 g/cm^{3}.

=== Kepler-51d ===
Kepler-51d is the puffiest planet in the system, with an density of just 0.0381 g/cm^{3}. It is also the largest planet orbiting Kepler-51, with 9.32 times Earth's radius (59,400 km), almost the same size as Saturn. Its mass, however, is only 3.8 times that of Earth.

Transmission spectroscopy with the Hubble Space Telescope revealed that Kepler-51d has a featureless spectrum, implying that its extended atmosphere has a high photochemical haze layer. Over time, the planet will contract and lose part of its atmosphere, but will still have a low density.

The rotation of the planet has been measured to be larger or equal than 40 hours.

=== Kepler-51e ===
Kepler-51e is the outermost planet in the system. It was discovered via transit-timing variations of Kepler-51d: The planet's transit time, measured with the James Webb Space Telescope, was found to be discrepant with the predictions made by a three-planet model, implying the presence of an yet unseen fourth planet. The best-fit planet model, which implies a 2:1 orbital resonance with Kepler-51d, give a mass between 1.6 and 6.1 Earth masses and an orbital period of 260 days. However, it is possible that it is a more massive planet with a longer and more eccentric orbit. Since it was not observed with the transit method like the inner planets, its radius and hence density cannot be measured.

== See also ==
- V1298 Tauri - a young system with four super-puff planets
