= Super-puff =

Planet with a mass slightly above Earth but with a radius larger than Neptune

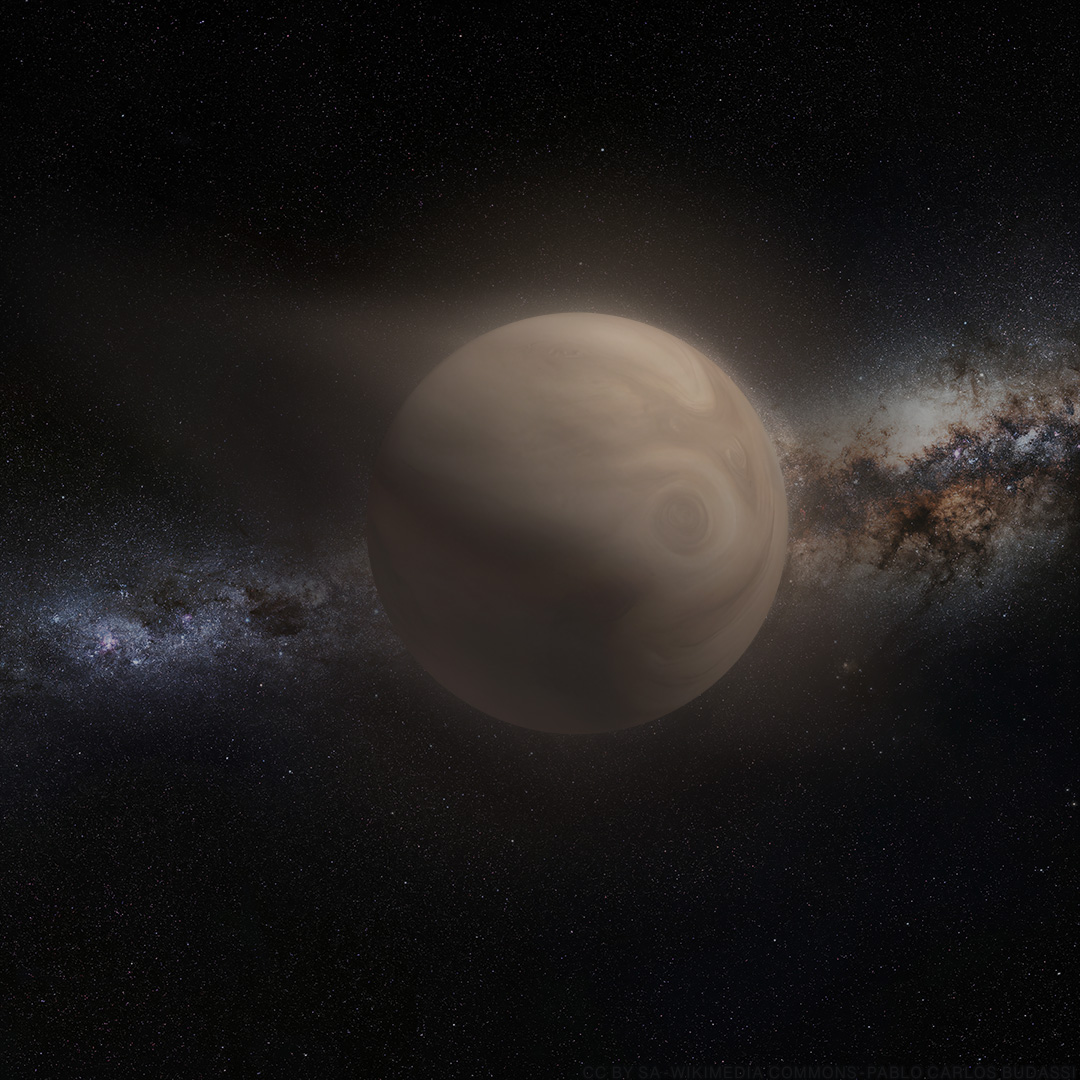
Artistic representation of a super-puff planet

A super-puff is a type of exoplanet with a mass only a few times larger than Earth's but with a radius larger than that of Neptune, giving it a very low mean density. They are cooler and less massive than the inflated low-density hot-Jupiters.

The most extreme examples known are the three planets around Kepler-51 which are all Jupiter-sized but with densities below 0.1 g/cm^{3}. These planets were discovered in 2012 but their low densities were not discovered until 2014. Another example is Kepler-87c.

One hypothesis is that a super-puff has continuous outflows of dust to the top of its atmosphere (for example, Gliese 3470 b), so the apparent surface is really dust at the top of the atmosphere. Another possibility is that some of the super-puff planets are smaller planets with large ring systems, like HIP 41378 f.

A 2026 study theorized that super-Earths and sub-Neptunes are puffy when they are young but shrink in size over time, with systems V1298 Tauri and Kepler-51 given as examples.

== Formation hypotheses ==
The anomalous mass-to-radius ratio of super-puff planets was first interpreted as evidence for the presence of substantial hydrogen-helium envelopes formed billions of years ago within the protoplanetary disk. In this long-term formation scenario, such envelopes would be prone to erosion through atmospheric escape processes, suggesting that maintaining extremely low densities over gigayear timescales would be difficult. The persistence of known super-puffs has therefore motivated alternative models of envelope formation and retention.
