= Oceanus moving group =

Stellar moving group in the Vela constellation

The Oceanus Moving Group is a stellar association located around 2-50 parsecs from the Sun in the constellation of Vela. It is roughly 510 million years old and contains 50 members, including Luhman 16, a binary system of brown dwarfs notable for being nearest to Earth. It is also one of the nearest young moving groups currently identified, making it valuable for the study of exoplanets and substellar members.
