= Platais 8 =

Faint open cluster in the constellation Carina

Observation data (J2000.0 epoch)
- Right ascension: 09^{h} 06^{m} 52.3^{s}
- Declination: −58° 41′ 06″
- Distance: 440±1 ly (134.9±0.6 pc)
- Apparent dimensions (V): 3.45° × 3.45°

Physical characteristics
- Mass: 546^{+265}_{−178} M_{☉}
- Radius: 37.2 ± 4.9 ly (11.4 ± 1.5 pc)
- Estimated age: 60±15 Ma
- Other designations: Platais 8, HIP 45080 Cluster, MWSC 1629

Associations
- Constellation: Carina

Platais 8, also known as the a Carinae cluster or HIP 45080 Cluster, is a small and faint open cluster located in the southern constellation Carina. It is estimated to be 440 light years distant based on parallax measurements.

The cluster was first noticed by astronomer Imants Platais in 1998. A 2005 paper suggests that Platais 8 might have formed near the area where the Scorpius-Centaurus association is located. The SIMBAD database lists the cluster having 28,185 members but the majority of the stars are field stars. In fact, there are only 32 members physically associated with the cluster. The cluster has a combined mass of 546 M_{☉} and a radius of 37.2 light years. Platais 8 is rather young, with an age of only 60 million years.

== Members ==
These are the members of the cluster as identified by Canat-Gaudin et al. (2018)

Members of Cl Platais 8
Name	m^{v}	MK Type	Dist. (ly)	Notes
HD 76230	6.57	A0 V	410	Binary
HD 78802	7.33	A2 IV	467	
HD 76413	7.48	A3 V	417	
HD 80628	7.57	A0/1 V	442	
HD 78761	7.68	A2 V	454	
HD 78027	7.88	A1 V	444	

The cluster also has one potential stream star located in Volans and was considered to be a background object prior to 2020.

Name	m^{v}	MK Type	Dist. (ly)	Notes
HD 71863	5.94	G8/K0 III	421	HR 3346
