= Castor Moving Group =

Moving group of stars sharing similar velocities and directions

The Castor Moving Group (CMG), or Castor stream, is a moving group of stars in the solar vicinity sharing similar velocities and directions. The stars that have been identified as part of the group include Castor, Fomalhaut, Vega, α Cephei and α Librae. While the reported group members are young (typically with ages of hundreds of millions of years), recent results suggest that the velocity differences amongst the moving group stars are too large for them to have possibly shared a common origin.

== Discovery and constituents ==
The moving group was first proposed by J. P. Anosova, and V. V. Orlov in 1990. Anosova and Orlov originally proposed 15 members. In 1999, Barrado y Navascues presented a membership list of 16 stars, and estimated a group age of 200 million years. The membership of the group has not been well-established and varies quite a bit amongst studies.

=== Physicality ===
There is controversy over whether the Castor Moving Group constitutes a physical group of stars of shared origin (e.g. an "association") or a group of stars of heterogeneous age and chemical composition that happen to have somewhat similar velocities (e.g. a "dynamical stream"). In their 2013 paper describing the discovery of Fomalhaut C, Mamajek et al. point out that the 3D velocities of the famous Castor Moving Group members Fomalhaut, Vega, Castor, and LP 944-20 are now very well-determined. They find that the star-to-star velocity differences are so large (typically ~5–10 km/s) that the stars were not within 100 pc of each other as recently as 10 Myr ago, let alone at the purported group age of ~200 million years. The local density of purported Castor Moving Group members is very low (roughly 0.4% of the mass density of the local Galactic disk), hence the systems are not bound to one another, and the high velocity dispersion can not be attributed to the dynamical interactions amongst the moving group members themselves. They conclude that at least those famous "members" of the Castor Moving Group (Fomalhaut, Vega, Castor, LP 944-20) are extremely unlikely to have shared a common origin.

=== Proposed member stars ===
- ζ Leporis (Darlugal)
- α Cephei (Alderamin)
- α^{1} Librae
- α^{2} Librae (Zubenelgenubi)
- Castor
- DX Cancri
- Fomalhaut
- HD 51825
- ψ Velorum (Gliese 351A)
- Gliese 426 AB
- GJ 408
- GJ 4247
- HD 117934
- HD 119124
- HD 162283
- HD 181321
- Gliese 842.2
- Gliese 896 AB
- TW Piscis Austrini (Fomalhaut B)
- κ Phoenicis
- Vega

== See also ==
- Ursa Major Moving Group
