= HAT-P-67b =

Gas giant exoplanet orbiting HAT-P-67

Discovery
- Discovered by: Zhou et al. (2017)
- Discovery site: HATNet
- Discovery date: April 2017
- Detection method: Transit

Orbital characteristics
- Semi-major axis: 0.0615±0.0022 AU
- Eccentricity: 0
- Orbital period (sidereal): 4.81010827^{+(59)}_{−(58)} days
- Inclination: 85.01+0.35 −0.32
- Semi-amplitude: 43±8 m/s
- Star: HAT-P-67

Physical characteristics
- Mean radius: 2.140±0.025 R_{J}
- Mass: 0.45±0.15 M_{J}
- Mean density: 0.061+0.020 −0.031 g/cm^{3}
- Temperature: 1,987±22 K

HAT-P-67b is an exoplanet orbiting around the star HAT-P-67. A gas giant on a close orbit, it is a hot Jupiter with one of the largest sizes and lowest densities of any known exoplanet.

== Characteristics ==
With a radius of over double that of Jupiter's HAT-P-67 b is one of the largest exoplanets known to date. It also one of the least dense at approximately 0.061+0.020
−0.021 grams per cubic centimeter, a density lower than that of marshmallows. It has a very close separation from its host star, taking four days and 19 hours to complete an orbit. Its host star is expanding in size as it is becoming a red giant, and in 150 to 500 million years it is expected that HAT-P-67b will be engulfed due to this expansion.

An analysis of a radial velocity time series obtained at the Galileo National Telescope detected the Rossiter–McLaughlin effect and determined the projected spin-orbit angle to be 2.2 ± 0.4°. The calculated value suggests an aligned planetary orbit, indicating that the planet likely migrated to its present orbit through tidal interactions with a protoplanetary gas disk.

== Discovery ==
Transits of HAT-P-67b were discovered by the Hungarian Automated Telescope Network (HATNet), using small, wide field telescopes, located at the Fred Lawrence Whipple Observatory in Arizona and at the Mauna Kea Observatory in Hawaii. Observations were made in 2005 and 2008, analysis of the obtained data revealed the periodic transits of HAT-P-67b. Follow-up photometry of the transits were obtained using the 1.2 m telescope at the Fred Lawrence Whipple Observatory. A full transit was observed on 2012 May 28, and five partial transits were observed in 2011, 2012 and 2013.

The high rotational velocity of the star made initial attempts to confirm the planet using radial velocity measurements difficult, with data from 2009 showing that the transiting object was less massive than a brown dwarf. Using measurements taken from 2009 to 2012 the Keck telescope was able to determine that the mass of the planet was less than 0.59 that of Jupiter. In 2016 Doppler tomography was used to confirm the planet.

== Atmosphere ==
Gas giants with masses less than Jupiter's, and temperatures greater than 1,800 K, like HAT-P-67 b, which has an equilibrium temperature of approximately 1,900 K, are so inflated and puffed out that they are all on unstable evolutionary paths which eventually lead to roche lobe overflow and the evaporation and loss of the planet's atmosphere.

A team of astronomers led by Aaron Bello-Arufe used the CARMENES spectrograph at the Calar Alto Observatory to study the atmosphere of HAT-P-67b. Based on this data, the planet's atmosphere seems to be highly ionized and may be escaping at a rate of 10 million tons per second. The team detected sodium and ionized calcium in the atmosphere of HAT-P-67b. Ionized calcium is typically found in hotter planets; however, it was detected quite prominently in the spectrum of HAT-P-67b.

The data also revealed absorption in the hydrogen and helium lines, typically a sign that part of the atmosphere is escaping into space. In the case of HAT-P-67b, these signals were detected before and after the planet's transit, suggesting the possibility of a vast cloud of gas escaping far beyond the planet. A different team led by Michael Gully-Santiago performed a multiyear spectroscopic survey of HAT-P-67 b, using the Habitable Zone Planet Finder on the Hobby–Eberly Telescope. They observed a prominent leading tail and a significantly fainter trailing tail, which they interpreted as direct evidence of preferential mass loss on the dayside. A third team using an average of many spectra acquired after transits found a clear absorption signal. They estimated an effective planetary radius 6 times that of Jupiter, indicating that the planet's atmosphere is evaporating.

== Host star ==
HAT-P-67 is a subgiant star located in the constellation Hercules. It is located 1,200 light-years from Earth. The star is 1.73 times more massive than the Sun, 2.65 times larger and 12 times more luminous. Its effective temperature is hotter than the Sun's, at 6,640 K. It makes a binary star with the red dwarf HAT-P-67 B.
