= Luhman 16 =

Binary brown dwarf system in the constellation Vela

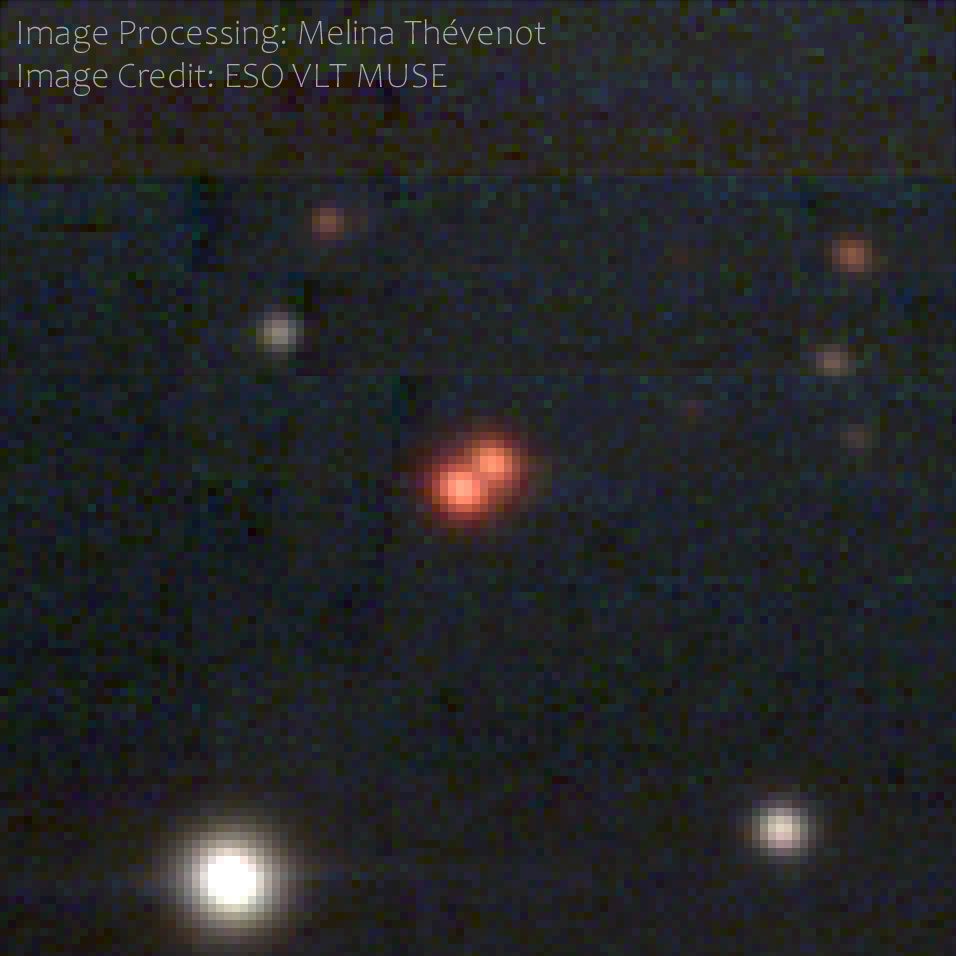
- Luhman 16 with VLT's MUSE instrument in visible light

Observation data Epoch J2016.0 Equinox ICRS
- Constellation: Vela
- Right ascension: 10^{h} 49^{m} 18.771^{s}
- Declination: −53° 19′ 09.88″
- Apparent magnitude (V): 16.20

Characteristics
- Spectral type: A: L7.5; B: T0.5±1
- Apparent magnitude (i (DENIS filter system)): 14.94±0.03
- Apparent magnitude (J (2MASS filter system)): 10.73±0.03
- Apparent magnitude (J (DENIS filter system)): 10.68±0.05
- Apparent magnitude (H (2MASS filter system)): 9.56±0.03
- Apparent magnitude (K_{S} (2MASS filter system)): 8.84±0.02
- Apparent magnitude (K_{S} (DENIS filter system)): 8.87±0.08

Astrometry
Proper motion (μ)	RA: −2,768.511 mas/yr Dec.: +358.472 mas/yr
Parallax (π)	500.993±0.050 mas
Distance	6.5102 ± 0.0006 ly (1.9960 ± 0.0002 pc)

Orbit
Period (P)	26.55±0.08 yr
Semi-major axis (a)	1.764±0.003" (3.52 AU)
Eccentricity (e)	0.344±0.001
Inclination (i)	79.92±0.008°
Longitude of the node (Ω)	130.02±0.01°
Periastron epoch (T)	2018.060±0.003
Argument of periastron (ω) (secondary)	136.67±0.09°

Details

Luhman 16A
Mass	35.4±0.2 M_{Jup}
Radius	0.102±0.005 R_{☉}
Luminosity	(2.2±0.4)×10^{−5} L_{☉}
Temperature	1305+180 −135 K
Rotation	6.94 hours
Age	400–800 or 510±95 Myr

Luhman 16B
Mass	29.4±0.2 M_{Jup}
Radius	0.102±0.005 R_{☉}
Luminosity	2.1+0.7 −0.5×10^{−5} L_{☉}
Temperature	1320+185 −135 K
Rotation	5.28 hours
Age	400–800 or 510±95 Myr

Other designations
- LUH 16, Luhman–WISE 1, WISE J104915.57−531906.1, DENIS-P J104919.0−531910, 2MASS J10491891−5319100, IRAS Z10473-5303, AKARI J1049166−531907, GSC2.2 S11132026703, GSC2.3 S4BM006703, TIC 119862115, GJ 11551

Database references
SIMBAD	The system
- A
- B
Exoplanet Archive	data

Luhman 16 (also designated WISE 1049−5319 or WISE J104915.57−531906.1) is a binary system of two brown dwarfs, located in the southern constellation Vela at a distance of 6.51 light-years (2.00 parsecs) from the Sun. These are the closest-known brown dwarfs and the closest system found since the measurement of the proper motion of Barnard's Star in 1916, and the third-closest-known system to the Sun (after the Alpha Centauri system and Barnard's Star). The primary is of spectral type L7.5 and the secondary of type T0.5±1 (and is hence near the L–T transition). The masses of Luhman 16 A and B are 35.4 and 29.4 Jupiter masses, respectively, and their ages are estimated to be 400–800 million years. Luhman 16 A and B orbit each other at a distance of about 3.5 astronomical units with an orbital period of approximately 26.6 years.

== Discovery ==
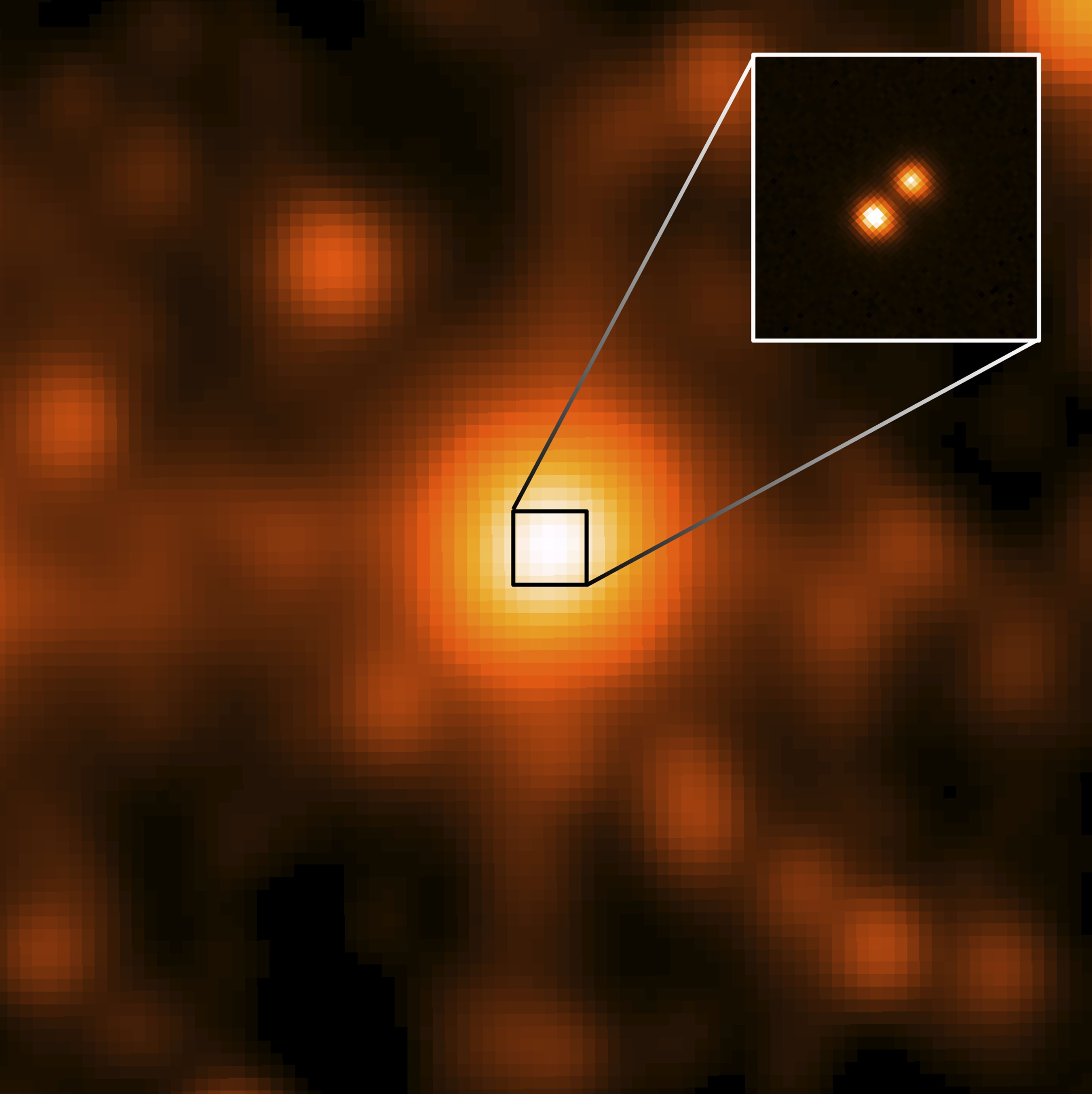
WISE image of Luhman 16. In the GMOS image in the inset, it is resolved into a pair.

This system was discovered by Kevin Luhman, astronomer from Pennsylvania State University and a researcher at Penn State's Center for Exoplanets and Habitable Worlds, from images made by the Wide-field Infrared Survey Explorer (WISE) Earth-orbiting satellite—NASA infrared-wavelength 40 cm (16 in) space telescope, a mission that lasted from December 2009 to February 2011; the discovery images were taken from January 2010 to January 2011, and the discovery was announced in 2013 (the pair are the only two objects announced in the discovery paper). The system was found by comparing WISE images at different epochs to reveal objects that have high proper motions.

Luhman 16 appears in the sky close to the galactic plane, which is densely populated by stars; the abundance of light sources makes it difficult to spot faint objects. This explains why an object so near to the Sun was not discovered in earlier searches.

=== Discovery of companion ===
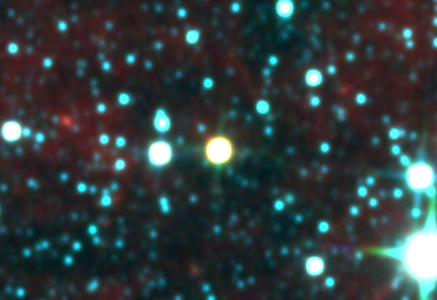
Luhman 16 is the yellow disc at the center of this WISE image. The individual brown dwarfs are not resolved.

The second component of the system was also discovered by Luhman in 2013, and was announced in the same article as the primary. Its discovery image in the i-band was taken on the night of 23 February 2013 with the Gemini Multi-Object Spectrograph (GMOS) at the Gemini South telescope, Chile. The components of the system were resolved with an angular distance of 1.5 arcseconds, corresponding to a projected separation of 3 AU, and a magnitude difference of 0.45 mag.

=== Precovery ===
Although the system was first found on images taken by WISE in 2010–2011, afterwards it was precovered from the Digitized Sky Survey (DSS, 1978 (IR) & 1992 (red)), Infrared Astronomical Satellite (IRAS, 1983), ESO Schmidt telescope (1984 (red)), Guide Star Catalog (GSC, 1995), Deep Near Infrared Survey of the Southern Sky (DENIS, 1999), Two Micron All-Sky Survey (2MASS, 1999), and the AKARI satellite (2007).

On the ESO Schmidt telescope image, taken in 1984, the source looks elongated with a position angle of 138°. The similarity of this position angle with that of the resolved pair in the GMOS image (epoch 2013) in Fig. 1 of Luhman (2013) suggests that the time period between 1984 and 2013 may be close to the orbital period of the system (not far from original orbital period estimate by Luhman (2013)).

== Name ==
Eric E. Mamajek proposed the name Luhman 16 for the system, with the components called Luhman 16A and Luhman 16B. The name originates from the frequently updated Washington Double Star Catalog (WDS). Kevin Luhman had already published several new discoveries of binary stars that have been compiled in the WDS with discovery identifier "LUH". The WDS catalog now lists this system with the identifier 10493−5319 and discoverer designation LUH 16.

The rationale given by Mamajek is that Luhman 16 is easier to remember than WISE J104915.57−531906.1 and "it seems silly to call this object by a 24-character name (space included)". (Note: In the first e-print version of the article the designation WISE J104915.57−531906 was used, which is an incorrect format for WISE identifiers because the last two characters ".1" were omitted, so it was mentioned that it is a "22-character name". In the second (and last) version of the e-print the correct 24-character designation was used.) The "phone number names" also include WISE J1049−5319 and WISE 1049−5319. Luhman–WISE 1 was proposed as another alternative.

As a binary object it is also called Luhman 16AB.

== Astrometry ==
=== Position in the sky ===
Location of Luhman 16 in the constellation Vela

Luhman 16 is located in the southern celestial hemisphere in the constellation Vela. As of July 2015, its components are the nearest-known celestial objects in this constellation outside the Solar System. Its celestial coordinates: RA = 10^{h} 49^{m} 18.723^{s}, Dec = −53° 19′ 09.86″.

=== Distance ===
The trigonometric parallax of Luhman 16 as published by Sahlmann & Lazorenko (2015) is 0.50051±0.00011 arcsec, corresponding to a distance of 6.5166 ± 0.0013 light-years (1.998 ± 0.0004 parsecs). Subsequent observations with Hubble and Gaia improved the parallax to 500.993+0.059
−0.048 mas, corresponding to a distance of 1.996036+0.00019
−0.00024 pc, which is accurate to about 50 astronomical units.

=== Proximity to the Solar System ===
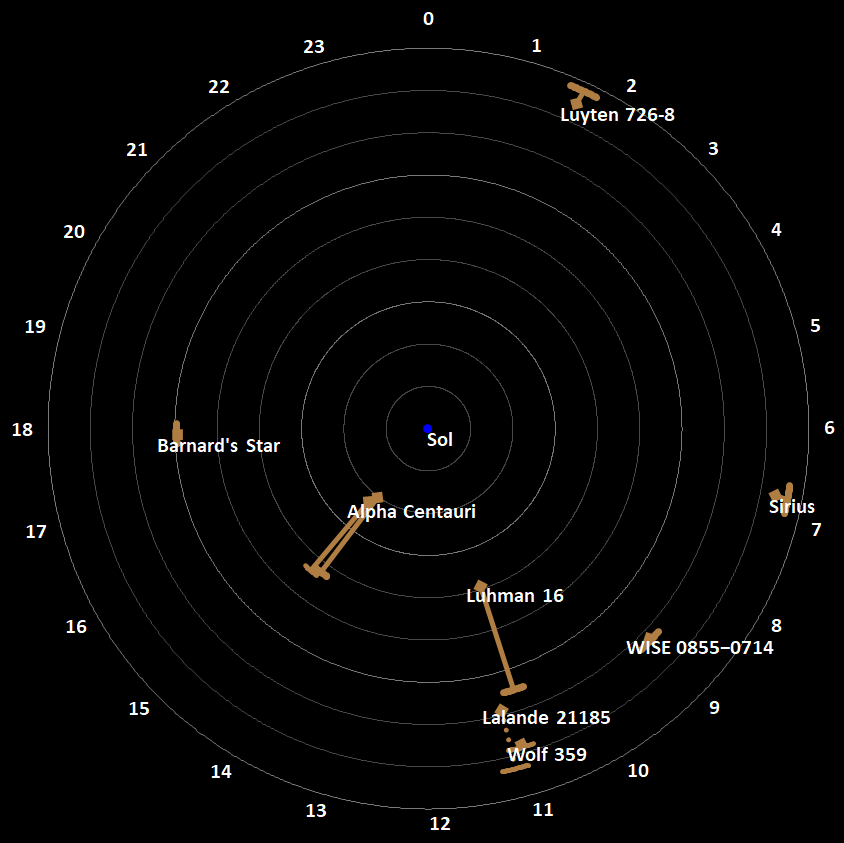
The position of Luhman 16 on a radar map of all known stellar and substellar objects within 9 light years (ly), arranged clockwise in hours of right ascension, and marked by distance (▬) and position (◆). Distances are marked outward from the Sun (Sol), with concentric circles indicating the distance in one ly steps. Positions are marked inward from their distance markings, connected by lines according to their declinations (doted when positive), representing the arcs of the declinations viewed edge-on.

Currently Luhman 16 is the third-closest-known star/brown-dwarf system to the Sun after the triple Alpha Centauri system (4.344 ly) and Barnard's Star (5.98 ly), pushing Wolf 359 (7.78 ly) to the fifth place, along with the discovery of WISE 0855−0714. It also holds several records: the nearest brown dwarf, the nearest L-type dwarf, and possibly the nearest T-type dwarf (if component B is of T-type).

=== Proper motion ===
The proper motion of Luhman 16 as published by Garcia et al. (2017), is about 2.79″/year, which is relatively large due to the proximity of Luhman 16.

=== Radial velocity ===
The radial velocity of component A was measured in March 2013 to be 23.1 ± 1.1 km/s (14.35 ± 0.68 mi/s), and that of component B to be 19.5 ± 1.2 km/s (12.12 ± 0.75 mi/s). Since values of the radial velocity are positive, the system currently is moving away from the Solar System.

Assuming these values for the components, and a mass ratio of Luhman 16 from Sahlmann & Lazorenko (2015) of 0.78, the system's barycentre radial velocity is about 21.5 km/s (13.4 mi/s). This implies that Luhman 16 passed by the Solar System around 36,000 years ago at a minimal distance of about 5.05 ly (1.55 pc).

== Orbit and masses ==
Luhman 16A and B orbit each other at a distance of only 3.5 AU.

In Luhman 16's original discovery paper, Luhman et al. (2013) estimated the orbital period of its components to be about 25 years.

Garcia et al. (2017), using archival observations extending over 31 years, found an orbital period of 27.4 years with a semi-major axis of 3.54 AU. This orbit has an eccentricity of 0.35 and an inclination of 79.5°. The masses of the components were found to be 34.2+1.3
−1.2 M_{Jup} and 27.9+1.1
−1.0 M_{Jup}, respectively, with their mass ratio being about 0.82.

With the data from Gaia DR2 in 2018, their orbit was refined to a period of 27.5±0.4 years, with a semi-major axis of 3.56±0.025 AU, an eccentricity of 0.343±0.005, and an inclination of 100.26°±0.05° (facing the opposite direction as the 2017 study found). Their masses were additionally refined to 33.51+0.31
−0.29 M_{Jup} and 28.55+0.26
−0.25 M_{Jup}. In 2024 the distance and orbit was further refined, resulting in a semi-major axis of 3.52 AU (assuming a parallax of 500.993 mas), an eccentricity of 0.344±0.001 and an inclination of 79.92°±0.001°, bringing the inclination in line with previous measurements. The secondary has a mass which is 83.05%±0.06% that of the primary. The individual masses were measured to be 35.2±0.2 and 29.4±0.2 Jupiter masses.

These results are consistent with all previous estimates of the orbit and component masses.

By comparing the rotation periods of the brown dwarfs with the projected rotational velocities, it appears that both brown dwarfs are viewed roughly equator-on, and they are aligned well to their orbits.

== Age ==
A 2013 paper, published shortly after Luhman 16 was discovered, concluded that the brown dwarf belongs to the thin disk of the Milky Way with 96% probability, and therefore does not belong to a young moving group. Based on lithium absorption lines the system has a maximum age of about 3–4.5 Gyr. Observations with the VLT showed that the system is older than 120 Myr and likely around 1 Gyr old.

However, in 2022, Luhman 16 was found to be a member of the Oceanus moving group, which has an age of 510±95 Myr. Age estimates of 400–800 Myr in 2024 is in line with the membership with this group. The age estimates are mismatched for both components, which could be due to different cloud coverage resulting in different cooling efficiency. Alternatively this could be due to inaccurate luminosities or errors in the evolutionary models.

== Search for planets ==
In December 2013, perturbations of the orbital motions in the system were reported, suggesting a third body in the system. The period of this possible companion was a few months, suggesting an orbit around one of the brown dwarfs. Any companion would necessarily be below the brown-dwarf mass limit, as otherwise it would have been detected through direct imaging. Researchers estimated the odds of a false positive as 0.002%, assuming the measurements had not been made in error. If confirmed, this would have been the first exoplanet discovered astrometrically. They estimate the planet to likely have a mass between "a few" and 30 M_{Jup}, although they mention that a more massive planet would be brighter and therefore would affect the "photocenter" or measured position of the star. This would make it difficult to measure the astrometric movement of an exoplanet around it.

Subsequent astrometric monitoring of Luhman 16 with the Very Large Telescope has excluded the presence of any third object with a mass greater than 2 M_{Jup} orbiting around either brown dwarf with a period between 20 and 300 days. Luhman 16 does not contain any close-in giant planets.

Observations with the Hubble Space Telescope in 2014–2016 confirmed the nonexistence of any additional brown dwarfs in the system. It additionally ruled out any Neptune mass (17 M_{🜨}) objects with an orbital period of one to two years. This makes the existence of the previously found exoplanet candidate highly unlikely.

Additional observations with Hubble rules out the existence of a planet with >1.5 Neptune masses at an orbit of 400 to 5000 days. However, this study did not rule out planets with a mass of less than 3 Neptune masses and a shorter period of 2 to 400 days.

A 70-day radial velocity campaign with Gemini South did not detect any planets for either brown dwarf. For Luhman 16A, the researchers exclude planets with orbital periods smaller than 1 day and a mass of M sin i > 0.2 M_{J}, as well as planets in orbits smaller than 10 days and a mass of >0.4 M_{J}. For Luhman 16B, the researchers exclude M sin i > 0.3 M_{J} in orbital periods <1 day, as well as >0.7 M_{J} in periods <10 days.

A total of 8 hours of observations with JWST/MIRI were used to search for sub-Io-sized satellites via the transit method. The search was sensitive to satellites as small as the Moon, but the researchers did not detect any satellites.

== Atmosphere ==
A study by Gillon et al. (2013) found that Luhman 16B exhibited uneven surface illumination during its rotation. On 5 May 2013, Crossfield et al. (2014) used the European Southern Observatory's Very Large Telescope (VLT) to directly observe the Luhman 16 system for five hours, the equivalent of a full rotation of Luhman 16B. Their research confirmed the observation of Gillon et al., finding a large, dark region at the middle latitudes, a bright area near its upper pole, and mottled illumination elsewhere. They suggest this variant illumination indicates "patchy global clouds", where darker areas represent thick clouds and brighter areas are holes in the cloud layer permitting light from the interior. Luhman 16B's illumination patterns change rapidly, on a day-to-day basis. Luhman 16B is one of the most photometrically variable brown dwarfs known, sometimes varying with an amplitude of over 20%. Only 2MASS J21392676+0220226 is known to be more variable.

Heinze et al. (2021) observed variability in spectral lines of alkali metals such as potassium and sodium; they suggested that the variations were caused by changes in cloud cover, which changed the local chemical equilibrium with chlorides. Lightning or aurorae were deemed possible, but less likely.

Luhman 16B's lightcurve shows evidence of differential rotation. There is evidence of equatorial regions and mid-latitude regions with different rotation periods. The main period is 5.28 hours, corresponding to the rotation period of the equatorial region. Meanwhile, the rotation period of Luhman 16A is likely 6.94 hours.

Biller et al. 2024 observed both components with JWST for 8 hours with MIRI LRS and directly followed by an 7 hour observation with NIRSpec. The observations found water vapor, carbon monoxide and methane absorption in both brown dwarfs, which is typical for L/T dwarfs. Luhman 16A shows a flat plateau beyond 8.5 μm, which is indicative of small grain silicates. The lightcurves produced from the observations show that both components are variable, with Luhman 16B being considerable more variable than Luhman 16A. The variability has a complex wavelength dependent trend. The researchers identified changes in behaviour at 2.3 μm and 4.2 μm coincident with the CO band and changes in behaviour at 8.3–8.5 μm coincident with silicate absorption. These changes in behaviour were interpreted as changes of average pressure at three different depths of the atmosphere. The observations also tested if patchy clouds could produce the variability. While small silicate grains corresponding to high-altitude silicate clouds were found in Luhman 16A, it is unlikely to be a patchy cloud layer. Luhman 16B does not have this small grained silicate feature, but larger grained silicate clouds deeper in the atmosphere are possible. The researchers also tested general circulation models (GCM) and hotspots, but the lightcurves are more complex than these models predict. A second epoch of JWST observations showed continued variability. The study found that patchy clouds likely shape the variability of deepest layer detected between 1-2.5 μm. CO and CH_{4} hot spots are located at high-altitude levels and detected between 2.5-3.6 μm and 4.3-8.5 μm. These hot spots are caused by vertical mixing and indicate temperature and/or chemical variation. Additionally WISE 1049A shows potential contribution by small-grained silicates detected at 8.5-11 μm and located at an intermediate layer.

Ishikawa et al. 2025 used 70 days of Gemini South H- and K-band spectroscopic observations to determine the composition of the brown dwarfs. The researchers detected ammonia (NH_{3}) in both brown dwarfs, making Luhman 16A the warmest brown dwarf with this detection. Both brown dwarfs also show water vapor (H_{2}O), carbon monoxide (CO), hydrogen (H_{2}), hydrogen sulfide (H_{2}S) and hydrogen fluoride (HF). The molecule methane (CH_{4}) shows a small contribution. Iron hydride (FeH) is not detected, meaning iron rain-out is more efficient than the models predict.

Using data collected by TESS, the research team, Dániel Apai, Domenico Nardiello and Luigi R. Bedin, found that the brown dwarf, between star and gas giant, is more similar to Jupiter in that its high-speed winds form stripes parallel to the equators of Luhman 16 AB.

Surface map of Luhman 16B recreated from VLT observations

Artist's impression of Luhman 16B based on the VLT observations

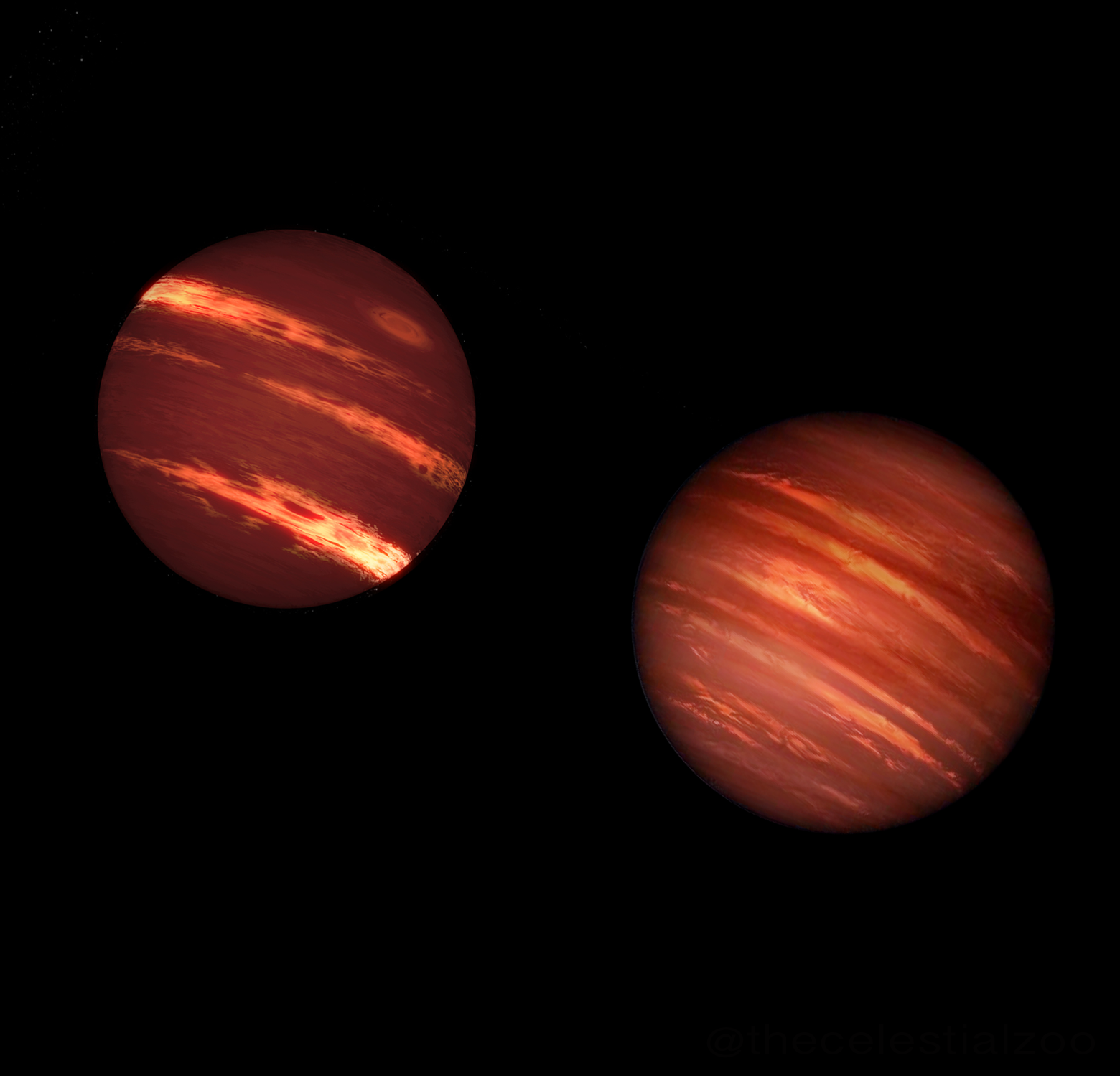
High-speed winds form bands parallel to the equators of Luhman 16 AB.

== Radio and X-ray activity ==
In a study by Osten et al. (2015), Luhman 16 was observed with the Australia Telescope Compact Array in radio waves and with the Chandra X-ray Observatory in X-rays. No radio or X-ray activity was found at Luhman 16 AB, and constraints on radio and X-ray activity were presented, which are "the strongest constraints obtained so far for the radio and X-ray luminosity of any ultracool dwarf".

== See also ==
- Substellar object
