= Mu Tauri =

Star in the constellation Taurus

- Location of μ Tauri (circled)

Observation data Epoch J2000 Equinox ICRS
- Constellation: Taurus
- Right ascension: 04^{h} 15^{m} 32.05806^{s}
- Declination: +08° 53′ 32.4783″
- Apparent magnitude (V): 4.27

Characteristics
- Evolutionary stage: main sequence
- Spectral type: B3IV
- U−B color index: −0.51
- B−V color index: −0.05

Astrometry
| Radial velocity (R_{v}) | +16.3±0.6 km/s |
| Proper motion (μ) | RA: +19.770 mas/yr Dec.: −21.918 mas/yr |
| Parallax (π) | 6.4463±0.2095 mas |
| Distance | 510 ± 20 ly (155 ± 5 pc) |
| Absolute magnitude (M_{V}) | −1.45 |

Details
| Mass | 6.7 M_{☉} |
| Radius | 6.9 R_{☉} |
| Luminosity | 325 L_{☉} |
| Surface gravity (log g) | 3.75 cgs |
| Temperature | 16,980 K |
| Metallicity [Fe/H] | −0.16 dex |
| Rotational velocity (v sin i) | 89 km/s |
| Age | 252 Myr |

Other designations
- μ Tau, 49 Tauri, BD+08°657, FK5 1118, GC 5134, HD 26912, HIP 116820, HR 1320, SAO 111696, GSC 00667-00839

Database references
| SIMBAD | data |

μ Tauri, Latinized as Mu Tauri, is a single star in the equatorial constellation of Taurus. It has a blue-white hue and is faintly visible to the naked eye with an apparent visual magnitude of 4.27. The star is located approximately 510 light years distant from the Sun based on parallax, and is drifting further away with a radial velocity of +16 km/s.

This object has a stellar classification of B3IV, matching a B-type subgiant star. In the past this star was thought to have a variable radial velocity, but is now considered constant. It is 252 million years old and is spinning with a projected rotational velocity of 89 km/s. The star has 6.7 times the mass of the Sun and is radiating 325 times the Sun's luminosity from its photosphere at an effective temperature of 16,980 K. It is emitting an infrared excess at a wavelength of 18 μm, making it a candidate host of a faint warm debris disk.
