= DX Cancri =

Red dwarf star in the constellation Cancer

- Location of DX Cancri in the constellation Cancer

Observation data Epoch J2000 Equinox ICRS
- Constellation: Cancer
- Right ascension: 08^{h} 29^{m} 49.35279^{s}
- Declination: +26° 46′ 33.6241″
- Apparent magnitude (V): 14.81

Characteristics
- Spectral type: M6.5V
- Apparent magnitude (J): 8.2
- U−B color index: +2.11
- B−V color index: +2.08
- Variable type: Flare star

Astrometry
Radial velocity (R_{v})	+9.0 km/s
Proper motion (μ)	RA: −1,113.694 mas/yr Dec.: −612.191 mas/yr
Parallax (π)	279.2496±0.0637 mas
Distance	11.680 ± 0.003 ly (3.5810 ± 0.0008 pc)
Absolute magnitude (M_{V})	16.98

Details
Mass	0.106±0.009 M_{☉}
Radius	0.1235±0.0006 R_{☉}
Luminosity	0.00073±0.000007 L_{☉}
Surface gravity (log g)	~5 cgs
Temperature	2,840 K
Rotation	0.46 days
Rotational velocity (v sin i)	11.0 km/s
Age	200 Myr

Other designations
- G 051-015, GCTP 2016.01, GJ 1111, LHS 248

Database references
SIMBAD	data
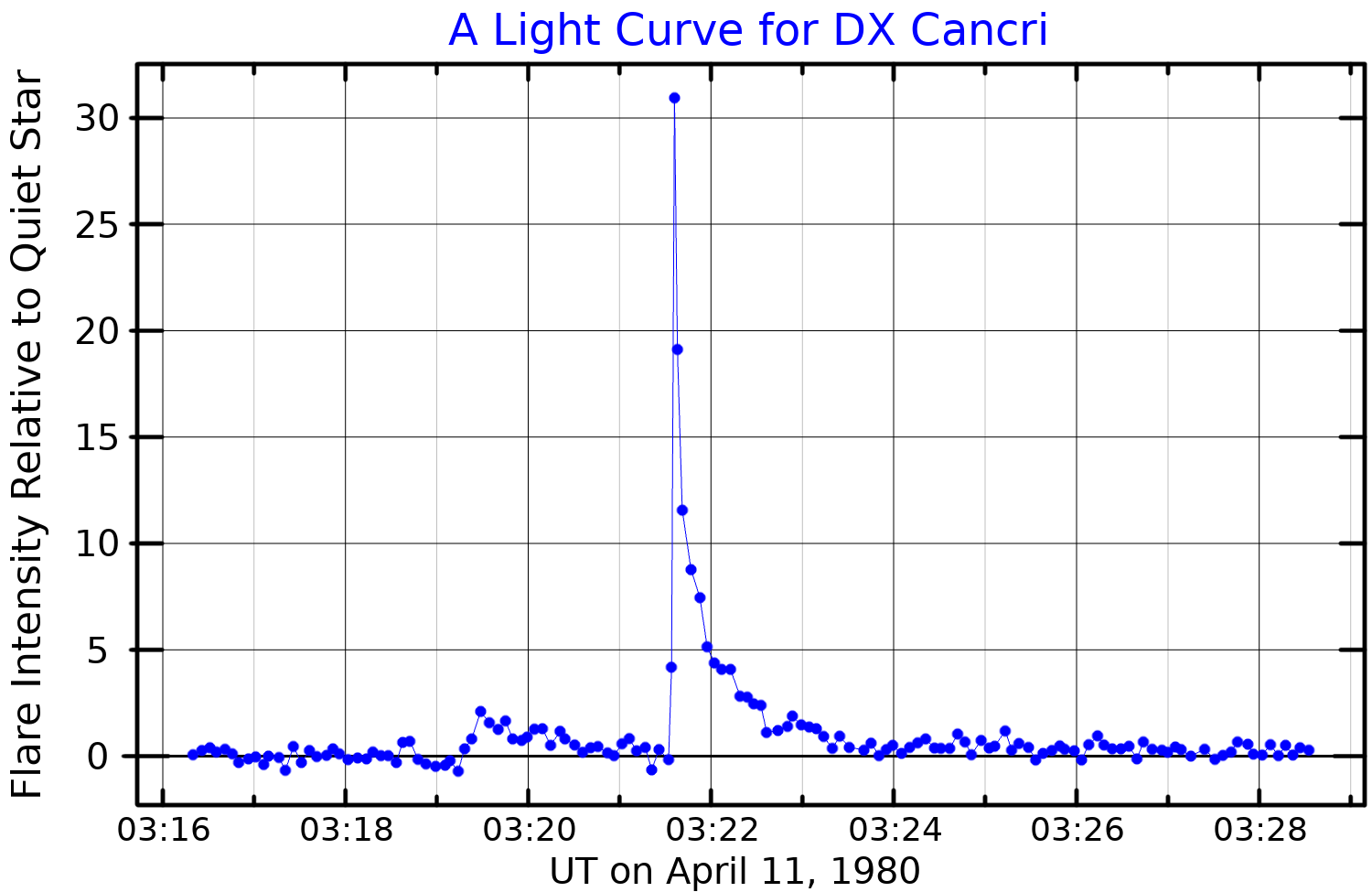
- An ultraviolet band light curve for a flare on DX Cancri, adapted from Pettersen (1981)

DX Cancri is a red dwarf star in the northern zodiac constellation of Cancer. It is the 18th closest star (or star system) to the Sun, at a distance of 11.680 light-years (3.581 parsecs) as determined by its parallax. It is also the nearest star in Cancer. Despite this, the star has less than 1% of the Sun's luminosity and, with an apparent visual magnitude of 14.81, is far too faint to be seen with the naked eye. Visually viewing this star requires a telescope with a minimum aperture of 16 in (41 cm).

In 1981, Bjørn Ragnvald Pettersen discovered that the star, then called G 51-15, is a variable star. It was given its variable star designation, DX Cancri, in 1985. It is a flare star that has unpredictable, intermittent increases in brightness by up to a factor of five.

The star has a stellar classification of M6.5V, identifying it as a type of main sequence star known as a red dwarf. Such stars are characterized by their high abundance in the universe, low mass, radius, faint brightness and reddish color. It has about 10% of the mass of the Sun, and 12% of the Sun's radius. The outer envelope of the star has an effective temperature of 2,840 K.

It is a proposed member of the Castor Moving Group of stars that share a common trajectory through space. This group has an estimated age of 200 million years.
