= List of exoplanets discovered in 2021 =

This list of exoplanets discovered in 2021 is a list of confirmed exoplanets that were first observed in 2021. For exoplanets detected only by radial velocity, the listed value for mass is a lower limit. See Minimum mass for more information.

Name	Mass (M_{J})	Radius (R_{J})	Period (days)	Semi-major axis (AU)	Temp. (K)	Discovery method	Distance (ly)	Host star mass (M_{☉})	Host star temp. (K)	Remarks
2M0437 b	4±1	1.16	1,136,000	115	1,450±50	imaging	417.9±1.5	0.165±0.015	3,100	Gas giant also known as 2MASS J0437+2171 b
b Centauri b	10.9±1.6		200000±100000	556±17		imaging	325±10	8±2		Circumbinary planet in unusually massive host star system
BD+45 0564 b	1.36±0.12		307.88±1.47	0.83±0.04		radial vel.	174±2	0.81±0.07	5,004±50	
BD+55 0362 b	0.72±0.08		265.59±1.04	0.78±0.05		radial vel.	168±2	0.909±0.099	5,012±78	Additional giant planet is suspected
BD+60 1417b	15±5	1.31±0.06		1662	1303±74	imaging	146.65±0.09	1.0	4993±124	Young (≈100 million years) host star
BD+63 1405 b	3.96±0.31		1,198.48±60.79	2.06±0.14		radial vel.	124.4±1.2	0.82±0.08	5,000±53	Extremely eccentric orbit
COCONUTS-2b	6.3^{+1.5}_{−1.9}		400000000	7506^{+5205}_{−2060}	434±9	imaging	35.6	0.37±0.02	3406±69	Planet also catalogued as WISEPA J075108.79−763449.6. First identified as a brown dwarf, but revealed to be an exoplanet in 2021.
EPIC 201427007 b	0.0090	0.134±0.018	0.72091±0.000067			transit	2304±55	0.930	5633±111	
EPIC 201595106 b	0.00705	0.116±0.009	0.877214±0.000087			transit	762±9		5820±20	Candidate since 2018; also known as K2-360b
EPIC 211314705.01		0.139±0.007	3.793306^{+0.000324}_{−0.000343}		543^{+8}_{−9}	transit	300.0±1.7	0.43±0.01	3,669^{+88}_{−82}	Two more planets in system are suspected.
EPIC 211401787.01		0.247^{+0.013}_{−0.008}	13.774798^{+0.000028}_{−0.000028}		969±9	transit	525±5	1.23±0.02	6,232^{+33}_{−39}	Host star also known as BD+12 1842.
EPIC 211502222.01		0.243^{+0.013}_{−0.009}	22.996591^{+0.001848}_{−0.001859}		673^{+12}_{−11}	transit	694±6	1.10^{+0.03}_{−0.04}	5,994^{+93}_{−91}	
EPIC 211502222.02		0.160^{+0.013}_{−0.009}	9.398977^{+0.001506}_{−0.001348}		909±14	transit	694±6	1.10^{+0.03}_{−0.04}	5,994^{+93}_{−91}	
EPIC 211525753.01		0.201^{+0.020}_{−0.014}	5.7385647^{+0.0013939}_{−0.0011048}	0.0632^{+0.0096}_{−0.0176}	1,066^{+190}_{−77}	transit		0.96^{+0.05}_{−0.06}	5,790^{+177}_{−147}	
EPIC 211537087.01		0.204^{+0.013}_{−0.011}	21.0267366^{+0.0036912}_{−0.0038993}	0.1599^{+0.0178}_{−0.0306}	624^{+0}_{−37}	transit		0.90^{+0.05}_{−0.06}	5,568^{+178}_{−150}	
EPIC 211579112.01		0.196^{+0.017}_{−0.014}	17.706320±0.000063		266^{+5}_{−8}	transit	403±5	0.27^{+0.01}_{−0.02}	3,315^{+137}_{−152}	
EPIC 211647930.01		0.552^{+0.025}_{−0.022}	14.759287^{+0.000243}_{−0.000240}		826^{+14}_{−17}	transit	1,133±17	1.06±0.04	5,880^{+85}_{−82}	
EPIC 211730024.01		0.504^{+0.032}_{−0.025}	5.113981^{+0.000061}_{−0.000062}		1,380^{+34}_{−30}	transit	1,226±21	1.36±0.05	6,502^{+132}_{−130}	
EPIC 211730267.01		0.332^{+0.021}_{−0.019}	16.3488637^{+0.0013811}_{−0.0014022}	0.1450^{+0.0136}_{−0.0235}	735^{+8}_{−39}	transit		0.98±0.07	5,794^{+210}_{−169}	
EPIC 211743874.01		0.197^{+0.016}_{−0.013}	12.283211±0.000051		949^{+21}_{−26}	transit	1,850±60	1.23±0.04	6,222^{+96}_{−91}	
EPIC 211763214.01		0.109^{+0.008}_{−0.005}	21.194733^{+0.000108}_{−0.000107}		569^{+15}_{−22}	transit	786±9	0.86^{+0.03}_{−0.05}	5,424^{+192}_{−144}	
EPIC 211770696.01		0.234^{+0.017}_{−0.013}	16.273563^{+0.000054}_{−0.000053}		850^{+19}_{−18}	transit	1,390±30	0.94^{+0.04}_{−0.03}	5,869^{+88}_{−81}	
EPIC 211779390.01		0.092^{+0.010}_{−0.005}	3.850614±0.000012		783^{+12}_{−14}	transit	514±2	0.66±0.02	4,558^{+91}_{−81}	
EPIC 211897691.02		0.171^{+0.017}_{−0.011}	19.507428^{+0.000116}_{−0.000113}		508±12	transit	1,187±17	0.74^{+0.04}_{−0.03}	4,857^{+86}_{−84}	
EPIC 211914998.01		0.239^{+0.015}_{−0.013}	11.2510285^{+0.0018188}_{−0.0017892}	0.0863^{+0.0079}_{−0.0159}	888^{+0}_{−47}	transit		0.93±0.06	5,650^{+193}_{−152}	
EPIC 211923431.01		0.300^{+0.039}_{−0.029}	29.740451^{+0.000169}_{−0.000161}		606^{+31}_{−36}	transit	2,460±70	0.93±0.04	5,532±90	
EPIC 211978988.01		0.287^{+0.022}_{−0.017}	36.552551^{+0.000127}_{−0.000122}		598^{+16}_{−15}	transit	1,390±20	0.98±0.07	5,817^{+45}_{−48}	
EPIC 212058012.01		0.181^{+0.012}_{−0.008}	11.561052^{+0.000690}_{−0.000668}		861^{+14}_{−15}	transit	684±6	1.01±0.05	5,920±104	
EPIC 212072539.01		0.180^{+0.009}_{−0.006}	7.676972^{+0.000012}_{−0.000012}		465±7	transit	545±3	0.49±0.01	3,804^{+93}_{−74}	
EPIC 212072539.02		0.147^{+0.015}_{−0.007}	2.787174±0.000004		653^{+10}_{−12}	transit	545±3	0.49±0.01	3,804^{+93}_{−74}	
EPIC 212081533.01		0.142^{+0.009}_{−0.004}	3.355850^{+0.000091}_{−0.000093}		722^{+7}_{−10}	transit	245.8	0.51±0.01	4,374^{+38}_{−34}	
EPIC 212088059.01		0.188^{+0.018}_{−0.008}	10.367437^{+0.000020}_{−0.000019}		437^{+4}_{−5}	transit	532±3	0.56±0.01	3,779^{+30}_{−26}	
EPIC 212132195.01		0.202^{+0.017}_{−0.009}	26.201446^{+0.003331}_{−0.003124}		450±5	transit	345.5±1.6	0.71±0.02	4,801±49	
EPIC 212161956.01		0.215^{+0.010}_{−0.009}	7.187257^{+0.000020}_{−0.000021}		640^{+20}_{−21}	transit	1055±13	0.66±0.03	4,599^{+178}_{−152}	
EPIC 212204403.01		0.291^{+0.020}_{−0.010}	4.688418^{+0.000119}_{−0.000117}		908^{+12}_{−11}	transit	662±5	0.83^{+0.02}_{−0.01}	5,077^{+40}_{−39}	
EPIC 212204403.02		0.238^{+0.021}_{−0.010}	12.550171^{+0.001018}_{−0.001057}		655^{+7}_{−9}	transit	662±5	0.83^{+0.02}_{−0.01}	5,077^{+40}_{−39}	
EPIC 212420823.01		0.123^{+0.009}_{−0.006}	9.032178±0.000874		518^{+5}_{−4}	transit	1,450±20	0.54±0.01	4,385^{+29}_{−31}	
EPIC 212440430.02		0.138^{+0.013}_{−0.010}	4.163873^{+0.000022}_{−0.000023}		1,158^{+29}_{−34}	transit	1,620±20	0.98±0.02	5,789^{+46}_{−50}	
EPIC 212543933.01		0.227^{+0.023}_{−0.017}	7.806164^{+0.000673}_{−0.000623}		934^{+28}_{−32}	transit	1,310±50	1.02±0.02	5,769^{+39}_{−37}	
EPIC 212624936 b	0.00589	0.517^{+0.098}_{−0.027}	0.578657±0.000066			transit			5765±170	Host star TYC 5557-667-1
EPIC 212624936 c	0.019	0.214^{+0.098}_{−0.057}	11.811437±0.00016			transit			5765±170	Host star TYC 5557-667-1
EPIC 220492298 b	0.00295	0.085±0.018	0.762406±0.00014			transit			5620±31	
EPIC 228836835 b	0.00431	0.089±0.027	0.728113±0.00004			transit	491±6		3782±152	
EPIC 251319382.01		0.171^{+0.012}_{−0.006}	8.234885^{+0.000508}_{−0.000475}		885^{+12}_{−14}	transit	577±6	0.95±0.02	5,791±81	
EPIC 251319382.02		0.199^{+0.012}_{−0.008}	14.871387^{+0.000916}_{−0.000936}		727±10	transit	577±6	0.95±0.02	5,791±81	
EPIC 251319382.03		0.122^{+0.009}_{−0.006}	3.665912^{+0.000273}_{−0.000295}		1,160^{+16}_{−15}	transit	577±6	0.95±0.02	5,791±81	
EPIC 251554286.01		0.496^{+0.020}_{−0.018}	15.466805^{+0.000572}_{−0.000565}		735^{+13}_{−14}	transit	883±12	0.87±0.02	5,698±55	
G 264-12 b	0.0079±0.0009		2.30538±0.00031	0.02279±0.00061	587±16	radial vel.	52.14±0.03	0.297±0.024	3,326±54	
G 264-12 c	0.0118±0.0015		8.0518±0.0034	0.0525±0.0014	387±11	radial vel.	52.14±0.03	0.297±0.024	3,326±54	
Gamma Piscium b	1.34^{+0.02}_{−0.31}		555.1^{+6.0}_{−2.5}	1.32^{+0.05}_{−0.08}		radial vel.	138	0.99^{+0.17}_{−0.13}	4742	
Gliese 146 b	0.0175^{+0.0023}_{−0.0021}		5.09071 ± 0.00026	0.0510^{+0.0024}_{−0.0026}	573^{+63}_{−69}	radial vel.	44.37±0.01	0.684±0.013	4,385±21	Host star also known as HD 22496.
Gliese 367 b	0.0017±0.0002	0.064±0.005	0.321962^{+0.000010}_{−0.000012}	0.0071±0.0002	1745±43	transit	30.695±0.016	0.45±0.011	3522±70	
Gliese 393 b	0.0054±0.0008		7.02679^{+0.00082}_{−0.00085}	0.05402±0.00072	485±11	radial vel.	22.956±0.008	0.426±0.017	3,579±51	
Gliese 486 b	0.0089±0.0004	0.117±0.006	1.467119^{+0.000031}_{−0.000030}	0.01734^{+0.00026}_{−0.00027}	701±13	transit	26.344±0.013	0.323±0.015	3,340±54	Planet may have a measurable atmosphere
Gliese 740 b	0.0093±0.0016		2.37756^{+0.00013}_{−0.00011}	0.029±0.001	829^{+40}_{−50}	radial vel.	36.21±0.02	0.58±0.06	3,913±21	
Gliese 9689 b	0.0304±0.0046		18.27±0.01	0.1139±0.0039	453±39	radial vel.	100.10±0.04	0.59±0.06	3,836±69	
HAT-P-58b	0.372±0.03	1.332±0.043	4.0138379±0.0000024	0.04994±0.00044	1622±18	transit	1690±40	1.031±0.028	6078±48	
HAT-P-59b	1.540±0.067	1.123±0.013	4.1419771±0.0000012	0.05064±0.00037	1278±7	transit	871±4	1.008±0.022	5678±16	
HAT-P-60b	0.574±0.038	1.631±0.024	4.7947813±0.0000024	0.06277±0.00017	1772±12	transit	767±7	1.435±0.012	6212±26	
HAT-P-61b	1.057±0.07	0.899±0.027	1.90231289±0.00000077	0.03010±0.00034	1505±16	transit	1120±20	1.004±0.012	5587±45	
HAT-P-62b	0.761±0.088	1.073±0.029	2.6453235±0.0000039	0.03772±0.00024	1512±13	transit	1150±20	1.023±0.020	5629±48	
HAT-P-63b	0.614±0.024	1.119±0.033	3.377728±0.000013	0.04294±0.00035	1237±11	transit	1330±20	0.925±0.023	5400^{+55}_{−39}	
HAT-P-64b	0.58^{+0.18}_{−0.13}	1.703±0.07	4.0072320±0.0000017	0.05387±0.00030	1766^{+22}_{−16}	transit	2135±20	1.298±0.021	6457^{+55}_{−36}	
HATS-74Ab	1.46±0.14	1.032±0.021	1.73185606±0.00000055	0.02384±0.00011	895.1±5.7	transit	952±12	0.601±0.008	3775±54	Host star also known as TOI-737
HATS-75b	0.491±0.039	0.884±0.013	2.7886556±0.0000011	0.032742^{+0.000134}_{−0.000099}	772.3±2.3	transit	640±4	0.6017^{+0.0074}_{−0.0055}	3812±79	Host star also known as TOI-552
HATS-76b	2.629±0.089	1.079±0.031	1.9416423±0.0000014	0.02658^{+0.00021}_{−0.00029}	939.8±6.7	transit	1272±19	0.662^{+0.016}_{−0.021}	3990±120	Host star also known as TOI-555
HATS-77b	1.374^{+0.100}_{−0.074}	1.165±0.021	3.0876262±0.0000016	0.03607±0.00025	828.3±5.9	transit	1440±40	0.655±0.014	4082±69	Host star also known as TOI-730
HD 360 b	0.75^{+0.12}_{−0.15}		273.1^{+1.6}_{−0.8}	0.98^{+0.11}_{−0.03}		radial vel.	362	1.69^{+0.15}_{−0.53}	4770	
HD 3765 b	0.173^{+0.014}_{−0.013}		1,211^{+15}_{−16}	2.108^{+0.032}_{−0.033}		radial vel.	78.5±0.1			
HD 5278 b	0.0245^{+0.0047}_{−0.0044}	0.219±0.004	14.339156^{+0.000049}_{−0.000047}	0.1202±0.0013	943±13	transit	183.1±2.7	1.126^{+0.036}_{−0.035}	6,203±64	Host star also known as TOI-130.
HD 5278 c	0.0579^{+0.0057}_{−0.0060}		0.2416±0.0027	0.1202±0.0013	943±13	radial vel.	183.1±2.7	1.126^{+0.036}_{−0.035}	6,203±64	Host star also known as TOI-130.
HD 10975 b	0.45^{+0.06}_{−0.15}		283.8^{+12.7}_{−0.1}	0.95^{+0.06}_{−0.08}		radial vel.	379	1.41^{+0.34}_{−0.35}	4840	
HD 13808 b	0.0346		14.2	0.11		radial vel.	92.2	0.771±0.022	5,035±50	Candidate since 2011, confirmed in 2021
HD 13808 c	0.0315		53.8	0.26		radial vel.	92.2	0.771±0.022	5,035±50	Candidate since 2011, confirmed in 2021
HD 19615 b	8.5±0.7		402±2	1.1±0.1		radial vel.	872±7	1.1±0.1	3987±125	Red giant host star
HD 24040 c	0.201±0.027		515.4^{+2.2}_{−2.5}	1.3±0.021		radial vel.	152.3±0.4	1.14±0.02	5,917±52	
HD 26161 b	13.5^{+8.5}_{−3.7}		32,000^{+21,000}_{−10,000}	20.4^{+7.9}_{−4.9}		radial vel.	133.6±0.3			Very eccentric orbit, and also red dwarf in the system
HD 27969 b	4.80^{+0.24}_{−0.23}		654.5^{+5.7}_{−5.8}	1.552^{+0.032}_{−0.033}	261±11	radial vel.		1.16±0.07	5,966±21	
HD 39474 b	0.42^{+0.05}_{−0.03}	1.008^{+0.012}_{−0.015}	52.97818^{+0.00004}_{−0.00004}	0.30^{+0.02}_{−0.03}	759^{+37}_{−26}	transit	372.5±1.1	1.316±0.027	6,394±75	Host star also known as TOI-201
HD 63935 b	0.0340±0.0057	0.267±0.013	9.058811^{+0.000017}_{−0.000016}		911±27	transit	159.36±0.15	0.933±0.054	5,534±100	
HD 63935 c	0.0349±0.0076	0.259±0.012	21.4023^{+0.00189}_{−0.00194}		684±21	transit	159.36±0.15	0.933±0.054	5,534±100	
HD 66428 c	27^{+22}_{−17}		39,000^{+56,000}_{−18,000}	23.0^{+19.0}_{−7.6}		radial vel.	174.1±0.7	1.09±0.02	5,773±55	
HD 68988 c	15.0^{+2.8}_{−1.5}		16,100^{+11,000}_{−3,500}	13.2^{+5.3}_{−2.0}		radial vel.	198.8±0.6	1.16±0.01	5,919±11	Suspected since 2006
HD 73583 b	0.0315±0.0098	0.253±0.009	6.3980418^{+0.0000065}_{−0.0000063}	0.0601±0.0026	721±21	transit	103.08±0.10	0.71±0.02	4511±110	Host star also known as TOI-560, planetary helium emission detected.
HD 73583 c	0.0302±0.0055	0.212±0.009	18.8797^{+0.00088}_{−0.00073}	0.1236^{+0.0053}_{−0.0053}	503±15	transit	103.08±0.10	0.71±0.02	4511±110	Host star also known as TOI-560
HD 79181 b	0.64^{+0.06}_{−0.16}		273.1^{+1.3}_{−0.4}	0.90^{+0.07}_{−0.08}		radial vel.	337	1.28^{+0.32}_{−0.28}	4862	
HD 80869 b	4.86^{+0.65}_{−0.29}		1711.7^{+9.3}_{−9.6}	2.878^{+0.045}_{−0.046}	203.2^{+6.8}_{−5.5}	radial vel.		1.08±0.05	5,837±15	Very eccentric orbit
HD 95544 b	6.84±0.31		2172^{+23}_{−21}	3.386^{+0.075}_{−0.077}	156.5^{+5.4}_{−5.5}	radial vel.		1.09±0.07	5,722±15	
HD 99183 b	0.97^{+0.06}_{−0.25}		310.4^{+5.2}_{−1.7}	1.08^{+0.05}_{−0.07}		radial vel.	355	1.76^{+0.31}_{−0.30}	4886	
HD 107148 c	0.0626^{+0.0097}_{−0.0098}		18.3267^{+0.0022}_{−0.0024}	0.1406±0.0018		radial vel.	161.4±0.4	1.1±0.1	5,789±36	
HD 108236 f		0.17406^{+0.00482}_{−0.00437}	29.54255±0.00069	0.1759±0.0037		transit	211	0.853±0.047	5,720.0±50.0	
HD 109286 b	2.99±0.15		520.1±2.3	1.259±0.021	259.4±5.5	radial vel.		0.98±0.05	5,694±23	
HD 103891 b	1.44^{+0.06}_{−0.05}		1919^{+14}_{−15}	3.27^{+0.02}_{−0.01}		radial vel.	179.0±0.4	1.28±0.01	6072±20	
HD 105779 b	0.64±0.06		2412^{+55}_{−52}	3.38±0.05		radial vel.	179.7±0.3	0.89±0.01	5792±16	
HD 110082 b		0.2857±0.0089	10.18271±0.00004	0.113^{+0.009}_{−0.013}		transit	342.8±0.9	1.21±0.06	6,200±100	Orbiting a primary of wide binary system Host star also known as TOI-1098.
HD 110113 b	0.0143±0.0020	0.183±0.011	2.541^{+0.0005}_{−0.001}	0.035±0.001	1,371±14	transit	346.5±2.3	0.99±0.08	5,730	Radius gap planet, host star also known as TOI-755
HD 110113 c	0.0330±0.0038		6.744^{+0.008}_{−0.009}	0.068^{+0.001}_{−0.002}	990±10	radial vel.	346.5±2.3	0.99±0.08	5,730	Host star also known as TOI-755.
HD 115954 b	8.29^{+0.75}_{−0.58}		3700^{+1500}_{−390}	5.00^{+1.3}_{−0.36}	144.9^{+8.1}_{−13}	radial vel.		1.18±0.06	5957±26	
HD 124330 b	0.75±0.06		270.66±1.21	0.86±0.04		radial vel.	198±3	1.15±0.079	5,873±19	Additional giant planet is suspected
HD 136925 b	0.84^{+0.078}_{−0.074}		4,540^{+160}_{−140}	5.13^{+0.12}_{−0.11}		radial vel.	156.2		5715	Additional planet suspected
HD 137496 b	0.0127±0.0017	0.117±0.005	1.62116±0.00008	0.02732±0.00019	2130^{+30}_{−29}	transit	509±6	1.035±0.022	5799±61	
HD 137496 c	7.66±0.11		479.9^{+1.1}_{−1.0}	1.2163^{+0.0087}_{−0.0088}	370±5	radial vel.	509±6	1.035±0.022	5799±61	
HD 150010 b	2.4±0.4		562±8	1.1±0.1		radial vel.	473.4±2.1	1.3±0.1	4256±125	Red giant host star
HD 152843 b	0.0364^{+0.0207}_{−0.0193}	0.304±0.012	11.6264^{+0.0022}_{−0.0025}	0.1053^{+0.003}_{−0.0031}		transit	352.0±1.0	1.15±0.04	6,310±100	
HD 152843 c	0.0865	0.521±0.013	24.38^{+6.23}_{−3.4}			transit	352.0±1.0	1.15±0.04	6,310±100	
HD 155193 b	0.75±0.06		352.65±2.58	1.04±0.04		radial vel.	186±6	1.221±0.083	6,239±20	
HD 156668 c	0.0991^{+0.0079}_{−0.0077}		811.3^{+5.2}_{−5.3}	1.570±0.017		radial vel.	79.34±0.03	0.772±0.020	4,850±88	Additional body in system is suspected
HD 161178 b	0.57^{+0.02}_{−0.16}		279.3^{+1.0}_{−0.8}	0.85^{+0.05}_{−0.07}		radial vel.	351	1.06^{+0.25}_{−0.17}	4786	
HD 164922 e	0.0331±0.0031		41.763±0.012	0.2293^{+0.0026}_{−0.0027}		radial vel.	71.69±0.03	0.874±0.012	5,293±32	
HD 168009 b	0.0300^{+0.0038}_{−0.0037}		15.1479^{+0.0035}_{−0.0037}	0.1192^{+0.0017}_{−0.0018}		radial vel.	75.97±0.03	0.99	5,792±80	
HD 174205 b	4.2±0.5		582±17	1.7±0.1		radial vel.	769±5	1.8±0.1	4393±125	Red giant host star
HD 183579 b	0.0620^{+0.0126}_{−0.0123}	0.317^{+0.013}_{−0.011}	17.471278^{+0.000058}_{−0.000060}	0.1334^{+0.0062}_{−0.0061}	769^{+17}_{−13}	transit	186.1±0.8	1.031^{+0.025}_{−0.026}	5,788±44	Host star also known as TOI-1055
HD 191939 e	>0.3531±0.0126		101.12±0.13	0.4007±0.012	390±8	radial vel.	175.1±0.2	0.92	5400	Also suspected brown dwarf on wider orbit
HD 207897 b	0.0453±0.0050	0.223±0.007	16.202159^{+0.000085}_{−0.000083}	0.1163^{+0.0017}_{−0.001}	632.2^{+8.1}_{−7.0}	transit	92.15±0.10	0.80^{+0.036}_{−0.030}	5,070^{+60}_{−57}	
HD 211403 b	5.54^{+0.39}_{−0.38}		223.8±0.41	0.768±0.013	380±13	radial vel.		1.20±0.06	6,273±44	
HD 213472 b	3.48^{+1.10}_{−0.59}		16,700^{+12,000}_{−4,800}	13.0^{+5.7}_{−2.6}		radial vel.	210.6			
HD 219139 b	0.78^{+0.05}_{−0.20}		275.5^{+2.3}_{−1.0}	0.94^{+0.06}_{−0.07}		radial vel.	345	1.46^{+0.31}_{−0.29}	4831	
HD 331093 b	1.50±0.11		621.62±16.11	1.44±0.07		radial vel.	164.07±0.14	1.030±0.079	5,544±33	
HIP 5763b	0.51		30.014^{+0.1528}_{−0.2842}	0.170		radial vel.	104.17±0.14	0.72		
HIP 34222b	0.83		160.0^{+2.7}_{−2.9}	0.492		radial vel.	74.55±0.09	0.62		
HIP 56640 b	7.1±1.6		2574.9±86.1	3.73±0.08		radial vel.	400.4±1.9	1.04^{+0.07}_{−0.06}	4769±55	Red giant host star also known as HD100939b
HIP 86221b	0.71		2.224^{+0.0004}_{−0.0005}	0.031		radial vel.	96±11	0.79		
HIP 90988 b	2.102^{+0.079}_{−0.085}		455.73816^{+2.11413}_{−1.88939}	1.26±0.01		radial vel.	307.6±1.2	1.30±0.08	4884±58	Gas giant orbiting a red giant host star also known as HD 170707
HIP 97166b	0.0629±0.047	0.245±0.012	10.28891±0.00004	0.089±0.001	757±25	transit	215.54±0.33	0.898±0.054	5,198±100	
HIP 97166c	9.9±1.8		16.84±0.22	0.124±0.002	642±22	radial vel.	215.54±0.33	0.898±0.054	5,198±100	
K2-99c	8.4±0.2		522.2±1.4	1.43±0.01	390±6	radial vel.	1980	1.6	5990	
K2-268d		0.133^{+0.013}_{−0.006}	4.528598^{+0.000016}_{−0.000015}		888^{+16}_{−15}	transit	1,079±10	0.84±0.02	5,106^{+70}_{−61}	Two more planets were previously known; host star also known as EPIC 211413752.
K2-268e		0.119^{+0.010}_{−0.007}	6.131243^{+0.000032}_{−0.000033}		801±13	transit	1,079±10	0.84±0.02	5,106^{+70}_{−61}	Two more planets were previously known; host star also known as EPIC 211413752.
K2-268f		0.199^{+0.013}_{−0.008}	26.270570^{+0.000105}_{−0.000109}		492^{+8}_{−10}	transit	1,079±10	0.84±0.02	5,106^{+70}_{−61}	Two more planets were previously known; host star also known as EPIC 211413752.
K2-185c		0.213±0.008	52.713494^{+0.000155}_{−0.000164}		477^{+14}_{−17}	transit	882±11	0.96^{+0.05}_{−0.07}	5,788^{+190}_{−157}	Host star also known as EPIC 211611158.
K2-304c		0.203^{+0.017}_{−0.011}	5.213965±0.000442		866^{+27}_{−37}	transit	1,380±20	0.83^{+0.05}_{−0.04}	5,171^{+172}_{−130}	Host star also known as EPIC 212297394.
K2-307c		0.207^{+0.017}_{−0.011}	23.228555^{+0.000068}_{−0.000071}		658^{+13}_{−14}	transit	1,050±20	0.99^{+0.03}_{−0.04}	6,004^{+77}_{−78}	Host star also known as EPIC 212587672.
Kepler-129d	8.3^{+1.1}_{−0.7}		2646^{+140}_{−94}	4.0±0.1		radial vel.	1,349±14	1.18	5,770	
Kepler-1704b	4.15±0.29	1.065^{+0.043}_{−0.041}	988.88113^{+0.00091}_{−0.00092}	2.026^{+0.024}_{−0.031}	253.8^{+3.7}_{−4.1}	transit	2,690±40	1.131^{+0.040}_{−0.051}	5,745^{+88}_{−89}	Very eccentric orbit (e=0.921),
KIC 5479689 b	0.5^{+0.4}_{−0.1}		1.701531^{+0.000008}_{−0.000419}			orbital brightness modulation	1,504	0.966^{+0.03}_{−0.04}	5459.1^{+90.0}_{−85.2}	
KIC 8121913 b	2.1±0.4		3.294601^{+0.000013}_{−0.00022}			orbital brightness modulation	2350	1.456^{+0.069}_{−0.15}	5075.3^{+110.2}_{−109.4}	
KIC 10068024 b	2.0±0.4		2.073549^{+0.000008}_{−0.000177}			orbital brightness modulation	3,600	1.22^{+0.175}_{−0.139}	6,118.4^{+127.2}_{−121.2}	
KMT-2016-BLG-2605b	0.8^{+1.2}_{−0.4}			0.68±0.11		microlensing	21,000±3,000	0.065^{+0.10}_{−0.035}		
KMT-2017-BLG-2509b	2.09^{+1.68}_{−1.26}			2.14^{+0.27}_{−0.39}		microlensing	23,000±3,000	0.46^{+0.37}_{−0.27}		
KMT-2018-BLG-1025Lb	0.0191^{+0.0258}_{−0.0104}			1.305^{+0.194}_{−0.227}		microlensing	22,000±3,000	0.219^{+0.297}_{−0.120}		Multiple solutions for orbital parameters
KMT-2018-BLG-1743	0.245^{+0.339}_{−0.135}			1.449^{+0.209}_{−0.229}		microlensing	21,000±3,000	0.193^{+0.268}_{−0.107}		Multiple orbital solutions, binary host star
KMT-2018-BLG-1976Lb	1.96^{+1.23}_{−1.12}			2.04^{+0.72}_{−0.83}		microlensing	19,000±2,000	0.65^{+0.41}_{−0.37}		
KMT-2018-BLG-1996Lb	1.22^{+0.72}_{−0.63}			1.97^{+0.51}_{−0.25}		microlensing	19,000±2,000	0.69^{+0.40}_{−0.38}		
KMT-2018-BLG-1988Lb	0.021^{+0.015}_{−0.011}			2.83^{+1.23}_{−0.97}		microlensing	14000^{+6000}_{−5000}	0.48^{+0.33}_{−0.25}		Multiple solutions for orbital parameters
KMT-2019-BLG-0371b	7.70^{+11.34}_{−3.90}			0.79^{+0.14}_{−0.16}		microlensing	2,3000^{+3,000}_{−4,000}	0.09^{+0.14}_{−0.05}		Multiple solutions for orbital separation
KMT-2019-BLG-0253b	0.029^{+0.016}_{−0.013}			3.1^{+0.8}_{−0.9}		microlensing	16,000^{+6,000}_{−5,000}	0.70^{+0.34}_{−0.31}		
KMT-2019-BLG-1715	2.56^{+1.13}_{−1.16}			3.32^{+0.82}_{−0.92}		microlensing	13,000±3,000	0.61^{+0.27}_{−0.28}		Multiple solutions for orbital separation, also 0.15M_{☉} red dwarf in the system.
KMT-2020-BLG-0414Lb	0.0032			0.15		microlensing	3,300±300	0.3		Also a brown dwarf with mass 17 M_{J} in the system at 15 AU separation
KMT-2021-BLG-0912Lb	0.022^{+0.007}_{−0.008}			3.03^{+3.46}_{−2.46}		microlensing	22000±3000	0.75^{+0.23}_{−0.28}		Multiple solutions for orbital parameters
KOI-5Ab	0.179	0.63	5			transit	1,870±70	1.13	5861	Also called TOI-1241b.
KOI-984b	0.0544±0.0094	0.384±0.004	4.2881785±0.0000035	0.0504±0.0006	1022^{+31}_{−30}	transit	749±4	0.928±0.031	5295±150	Another planet in system on poorly constrained orbit
KOI-4777b		0.046±0.003	0.412000±0.000001	0.0080±0.0003	1180±20	transit	565±4	0.41±0.02	3515±69	
Lalande 21185 c	0.0568^{+0.0091}_{−0.0083}		3190^{+200}_{−170}	3.1^{+0.13}_{−0.11}		radial vel.	8.31±0.01	0.390±0.011	3,601±51	
Lambda Serpentis b	0.0428^{+0.0047}_{−0.0045}		15.5083^{+0.0016}_{−0.0018}	0.1238±0.002		radial vel.	38.87±0.07	1.14	5,884±4	
LHS 1478 b	0.0073±0.0006	0.111±0.004	1.9495378^{+0.0000040}_{−0.0000041}	0.01848^{+0.00061}_{−0.0006}	595^{+10}_{−9}	transit	59.40±0.03	0.236±0.012	3,381±54	Host star also known as TOI-1640 or G 245-61.
LHS 1678 b	0.0002±0.0003	0.062±0.004	0.8602322^{+0.0000068}_{−0.0000048}	0.01251^{+0.00059}_{−0.00056}		transit	64.88±0.03	0.345±0.014	3490±50	
LHS 1678 c	0.0012^{+0.0013}_{−0.0008}	0.088±0.006	3.694247^{+0.0000024}_{−0.0000021}	0.0331^{+0.0016}_{−0.0015}		transit	64.88±0.03	0.345±0.014	3490±50	
LTT 1445 Ac	0.0048±0.0006	0.103	3.12390	0.02661^{+0.00047}_{−0.00049}		transit	22.41±0.01	0.256±0.014	3337±150	
L 98-59 e	0.0094		12.8	0.071	342^{+20}_{−18}	radial vel.	34.6	0.32±0.03	3500±150	
L 98-59 f	0.0078		23.2	0.103	285^{+18}_{−17}	radial vel.	34.6	0.32±0.03	3500±150	Unconfirmed, potentially habitable exoplanet
NGTS-13b	4.84±0.44	1.142±0.046	4.12	0.0549^{+0.0015}_{−0.0025}	1,605±30	transit	2150	1.30^{+0.11}_{−0.18}	5,819±73	
NGTS-14Ab	0.092±0.012	0.444±0.030	3.5357173±0.0000069	0.0403±0.0071	1,143±139	transit	1,060	0.898±0.035	5,187±11	
NGTS-15b	0.751^{+0.102}_{−0.088}	1.10±0.10	3.27623±0.00001	0.0441±0.0046	1,146±47	transit	2,580±60	0.995±0.015	5,600±150	
NGTS-16b	0.667^{+0.157}_{−0.129}	1.30^{+0.13}_{−0.12}	4.84532±0.00002	0.0523±0.0064	1,177±59	transit	2,910^{+95}_{−75}	1.002±0.011	5,550±150	
NGTS-17b	0.764^{+0.195}_{−0.164}	1.24±0.11	3.24253±0.00001	0.0391±0.0043	1,457±50	transit	3,420±90	1.025^{+0.015}_{−0.014}	5,650±100	
NGTS-18b	0.409^{+0.081}_{−0.063}	1.21±0.18	3.05125±0.00001	0.0448±0.0068	1,381^{+55}_{−53}	transit	3,610±140	1.003^{+0.020}_{−0.012}	5,610±150	
OGLE-2014-BLG-0319Lb	0.57^{+0.36}_{−0.31}			3.49^{+1.17}_{−1.12}		microlensing	25000^{+4000}_{−9000}	0.52^{+0.33}_{−0.29}		
OGLE-2014-BLG-0676Lb	3.68^{+0.69}_{−1.44}			4.53^{+1.49}_{−2.50}		microlensing	8700^{+2500}_{−4600}	0.73^{+0.14}_{−0.29}		
OGLE-2017-BLG-1099b	3.02^{+2.43}_{−1.81}			2.73^{+0.40}_{−0.53}		microlensing	24,000±3,000	0.45^{+0.36}_{−0.27}		
OGLE-2018-BLG-0383L b	0.0201^{+0.0173}_{−0.0088}			1.8±0.2		microlensing	25000±2000	0.10^{+0.13}_{−0.05}		
OGLE-2018-BLG-0506	0.051^{+0.038}_{−0.027}			3.0^{+0.7}_{−0.8}		microlensing	18,000±5,000	0.63^{+0.37}_{−0.32}		
OGLE-2018-BLG-0516	0.063^{+0.052}_{−0.034}			2.2^{+0.8}_{−0.7}		microlensing	7,000^{+3,000}_{−2,000}	0.47^{+0.38}_{−0.25}		
OGLE-2018-BLG-0567Lb	0.32^{+0.34}_{−0.16}			2.72^{+0.49}_{−0.55}		microlensing	23,000±3,000	0.24^{+0.16}_{−0.13}		
OGLE-2018-BLG-0962Lb	1.37^{+0.80}_{−0.72}			3.57^{+0.68}_{−1.02}		microlensing	21,000^{+3,000}_{−5,000}	0.55^{+0.32}_{−0.29}		
OGLE-2018-BLG-0977	0.020^{+0.016}_{−0.012}			2.0^{+0.6}_{−0.5}		microlensing	7,000±2,000	0.47^{+0.38}_{−0.27}		
OGLE-2018-BLG-1428Lb	0.77^{+0.77}_{−0.53}			3.30^{+0.59}_{−0.83}		microlensing	20,000^{+3,000}_{−5,000}	0.43^{+0.33}_{−0.22}		
OGLE-2019-BLG-0299b	6.22^{+3.80}_{−3.67}			2.80^{+0.58}_{−0.89}		microlensing	19,000±4,000	0.59^{+0.36}_{−0.35}		
OGLE-2019-BLG-0468Lb	3.43^{+1.83}_{−1.17}			3.29^{+4.15}_{−2.52}		microlensing	14000±3000	0.92^{+0.49}_{−0.32}		Multiple solutions for orbital parameters
OGLE-2019-BLG-0468Lc	10.22^{+5.46}_{−3.50}			2.77^{+3.49}_{−2.12}		microlensing	14000±3000	0.92^{+0.49}_{−0.32}		Multiple solutions for orbital parameters
OGLE-2019-BLG-0954Lb	14.2^{+9.9}_{−7.5}			2.65^{+0.89}_{−1.20}		microlensing	12,000^{+1,000}_{−2,000}	0.80^{+0.55}_{−0.42}		
OGLE-2019-BLG-0960Lb	0.0071±0.0027			1.75±0.55		microlensing	2,900±1000	0.45±0.15		Smallest planet discovered by microlensing
OGLE-2019-BLG-1053Lb	0.0078^{+0.0037}_{−0.0031}			3.4±0.5		microlensing	22,000^{+3,000}_{−2,000}	0.61^{+0.29}_{−0.24}		
OGLE-2019-BLG-1058	6.836±6.027					microlensing	8,000±5,000			Multiple solutions, rogue planet
OGLE-2018-BLG-1185b	0.026^{+0.025}_{−0.015}			1.54^{+0.18}_{−0.22}		microlensing	24,000^{+2,000}_{−3,000}	0.37^{+0.35}_{−0.21}		Multiple solutions for planet and star masses.
OGLE-2019-BLG-1492	0.117^{+0.079}_{−0.061}			2.7±0.9		microlensing	18,000^{+6,000}_{−7,000}	0.68±0.34		
RR Caeli c	2.7±0.7		14,200±300	9.7±0.9		timing	69.10±0.03	0.18+0.44	3,100+7,540	Circumbinary planet around red and white dwarfs
TIC 172900988 b	2.84±0.25	1.009±0.043	196.5±7.7			transit	799±9	1.24 and 1.20	6050 and 5983	Circumbinary planet
TIC 257060897b	0.67±0.03	1.49±0.04	3.660028±0.000006	0.051±0.002	1,762±21	transit	1,655±8	1.32±0.04	6,128±57	
TOI-178b	0.0047^{+0.0012}_{−0.0013}	0.102±0.006	1.914558±0.000018	0.02607±0.00078	1,040^{+22}_{−21}	transit	205.16±0.03	0.650^{+0.027}_{−0.029}	4,316±70	
TOI-178c	0.015^{+0.0017}_{−0.0021}	0.149^{+0.01}_{−0.008}	3.238450^{+0.000020}_{−0.000019}	0.0370±0.0011	873±18	transit	205.16±0.03	0.650^{+0.027}_{−0.029}	4,316±70	
TOI-178d	0.0094^{+0.0025}_{−0.0032}	0.229±0.006	6.557700±0.000016	0.0592±0.0018	690±14	transit	205.16±0.03	0.650^{+0.027}_{−0.029}	4,316±70	
TOI-178e	0.0121^{+0.0039}_{−0.0029}	0.197^{+0.007}_{−0.008}	9.961881±0.000042	0.0783^{+0.0023}_{−0.0024}	600±12	transit	205.16±0.03	0.650^{+0.027}_{−0.029}	4,316±70	
TOI-178f	0.0242^{+0.0052}_{−0.0047}	0.204±0.009	15.231915^{+0.000115}_{−0.000095}	0.1039±0.0031	521±11	transit	205.16±0.03	0.650^{+0.027}_{−0.029}	4,316±70	
TOI-178g	0.0123^{+0.0041}_{−0.0050}	0.256^{+0.012}_{−0.011}	20.70950^{+0.00014}_{−0.00011}	0.1275^{+0.0038}_{−0.0039}	470±10	transit	205.16±0.03	0.650^{+0.027}_{−0.029}	4,316±70	
TOI-220 b	0.0434±0.0031	0.271±0.013	10.695264	0.08911±0.0010	805±21	transit	290±13	0.825±0.028	5,298±65	Additional long-period planet suspected
TOI-269 b	0.0277±0.0044	0.247±0.011	3.697723^{+0.000018}_{−0.000017}	0.0345±0.0015	531±25	transit	186.01±0.25	0.3917±0.0095	3,514±70	
TOI-431 b	0.0097±0.0011	0.0014±0.004	0.490047^{+0.000010}_{−0.000007}	0.0113^{+0.0002}_{−0.0003}	1,862±42	transit	106.37±0.03	0.78±0.07	4,850±75	Host star lso known as CD-26 2288 or HIP 26013.
TOI-431 c	0.0089^{+0.0013}_{−0.0011}		4.8494^{+0.0003}_{−0.0002}	0.0052±0.001	867±20	radial vel.	106.37±0.03	0.78±0.07	4,850±75	Host star also known as CD-26 2288 or HIP 26013.
TOI-431 d	0.0312±0.0047	0.294±0.008	12.46103±0.00002	0.098±0.002	633±14	transit	106.37±0.03	0.78±0.07	4,850±75	Host star lso known as CD-26 2288 or HIP 26013.
TOI 451 b		0.1732^{+0.0134}_{−0.0116}	1.858701^{+0.000027}_{−0.000033}	0.0271^{+0.0023}_{−0.0038}	1,524^{+100}_{−60}	transit	405.1±1.3	0.94±0.025	5,550±56	Planets orbiting primary of wide binary system. Host star also known as CD-38 1467.
TOI 451 c		0.2741±0.0125	9.192523^{+0.000064}_{−0.000084}	0.0771^{+0.0066}_{−0.0093}	903^{+53}_{−36}	transit	405.1±1.3	0.94±0.025	5,550±56	Planets orbiting primary of wide binary system. Host star also known as CD-38 1467.
TOI 451 d		0.3598±0.0134	16.364981^{+0.000047}_{−0.000049}	0.1255^{+0.0057}_{−0.0065}	708^{+15}_{−12}	transit	405.1±1.3	0.94±0.025	5,550±56	Planets orbiting primary of wide binary system Host star also known as CD-38 1467.
TOI-530b	0.40^{+0.09}_{−0.10}	0.83±0.06	6.387597^{+0.000019}_{−0.000018}	0.052^{+0.005}_{−0.004}	565^{+28}_{−31}	transit	482±2	0.53±0.02	3,659±120	
TOI-532b	0.1935^{+0.0305}_{−0.0293}	0.520±0.017	2.3266508±0.0000030	0.0296±0.00035	867±18	transit	439.1±1.2	0.639±0.023	3927±37	Neptunian desert planet
TOI-558b	3.61±0.15	1.086^{+0.041}_{−0.038}	14.574071±0.000026	0.1291^{+0.0020}_{−0.0021}	1,061^{+13}_{−12}	transit	1,312±17	1.349^{+0.064}_{−0.065}	6,466^{+95}_{−93}	
TOI-559b	6.01^{+0.24}_{−0.23}	1.091^{+0.028}_{−0.025}	6.9839095±0.0000051	0.0723±0.0013	1,180^{+18}_{−16}	transit	761±7	1.026±0.057	5,925^{+85}_{−76}	
TOI-628 b	6.33^{+0.29}_{−0.31}	1.060^{+0.041}_{−0.034}	3.4095675^{+0.0000070}_{−0.0000069}	0.04860^{+0.00080}_{−0.00094}	1,586^{+52}_{−40}	transit	582	1.311^{+0.066}_{−0.075}	6,250^{+220}_{−190}	Host star also known as HD 288842
TOI-640 b	0.88±0.16	1.771^{+0.060}_{−0.056}	5.0037775±0.0000048	0.06608^{+0.00098}_{−0.0011}	1,749^{+26}_{−30}	transit	1,115	1.536^{+0.069}_{−0.076}	6,460^{+130}_{−150}	
TOI-674b	0.0739±0.0104	0.470±0.016	1.977143±0.000003	0.0231±0.0007	661±14	transit	150.86±0.11	0.442±0.007	3,505^{+28}_{−32}	Possibly steam atmosphere
TOI-712 b	0.0176	0.183^{+0.011}_{−0.007}	9.531361^{+0.000018}_{−0.000017}	0.07928^{+0.00096}_{−0.00091}	650.0^{+6.0}_{−5.9}	transit	191.2±0.4	0.732^{+0.027}_{−0.025}	4622^{+61}_{−59}	
TOI-712 c	0.0274	0.241^{+0.008}_{−0.007}	51.69906±0.00017	0.2447^{+0.0030}_{−0.0028}	369.9^{+3.4}_{−3.3}	transit	191.2±0.4	0.732^{+0.027}_{−0.025}	4622^{+61}_{−59}	
TOI-712 d	0.0236	0.221^{+0.008}_{−0.007}	84.83960^{+0.00043}_{−0.00040}	0.3405^{+0.0041}_{−0.0039}	313.6^{+2.9}_{−2.8}	transit	191.2±0.4	0.732^{+0.027}_{−0.025}	4622^{+61}_{−59}	
TOI-942 b		0.347^{+0.022}_{−0.020}	4.32421±0.000019	0.04866^{+0.00016}_{−0.00013}		transit	493.9±1.0	0.8220^{+0.0079}_{−0.0064}		
TOI-942 c		0.417^{+0.030}_{−0.027}	10.156272^{+0.000037}_{−0.000034}	0.08598^{+0.00027}_{−0.00022}		transit	493.9±1.0	0.8220^{+0.0079}_{−0.0064}		
TOI 1062 b	0.0320±0.0026	0.202±0.008	4.11412^{+0.0014}_{−0.0015}	0.052	1,077^{+10}_{−9}	transit	268.7±0.2	0.94±0.02	5,328±56	
TOI 1062 c	0.0294±0.0039		7.978^{+0.021}_{−0.023}	0.080^{+0.013}_{−0.012}	859^{+9}_{−8}	radial vel.	268.7±0.2	0.94±0.02	5,328±56	
TOI-1201 b	0.0198±0.0027	0.216±0.008	2.4919863^{+0.0000030}_{−0.0000031}	0.0287±0.0012	703^{+15}_{−14}	transit	122.77±0.10	0.512±0.020	3,476±51	Belongs to the Hyades, also red dwarf in the system.
TOI 1227 b		0.854^{+0.067}_{−0.052}	27.36397±0.00011	0.0886^{+0.0054}_{−0.0057}		transit	329.3±0.8	0.170±0.015	3,072±74	
TOI-1231 b	0.0485±0.0104	0.326±0.014	24.245586^{+0.000064}_{−0.000066}	0.1288^{+0.0021}_{−0.0022}	330	transit	89.68±0.04	0.485±0.024	3,553±31	
TOI-1238b	0.0183±0.0035	0.108±0.010	0.764596^{+0.000016}_{−0.000013}	0.0139±0.0008	1133±167	transit	2030.44±0.20	0.59±0.02	4089±54	
TOI-1238c	0.0262±0.0059	0.188±0.013	3.294733^{+0.000040}_{−0.000047}	0.037±0.002	695±105	transit	2030.44±0.20	0.59±0.02	4089±54	
TOI-1259Ab	0.441^{+0.049}_{−0.047}	1.022^{+0.030}_{−0.037}	3.4779780^{+0.0000019}_{−0.0000017}	0.04070^{+0.00114}_{−0.00110}	936	transit	385±1	0.68^{+0.1}_{−0.01}	4,775±100	Also white dwarf on a wide orbit
TOI-1260 b	0.0271^{+0.0043}_{−0.0037}	0.208^{+0.009}_{−0.008}	3.12748^{+0.000047}_{−0.000038}	0.0366^{+0.0022}_{−0.0036}	860^{+47}_{−31}	transit	239.5±0.3	0.66±0.01	4,227±85	
TOI-1260 c	0.0373^{+0.0106}_{−0.0102}	0.252±0.013	7.49325^{+0.00015}_{−0.00013}	0.0656^{+0.0039}_{−0.0065}	643^{+35}_{−23}	transit	239.5±0.3	0.66±0.01	4,227±85	
TOI-1296b	0.298±0.039	1.231±0.031	3.9443715±0.0000058	0.0497^{+0.0023}_{−0.0028}	1,562^{+43}_{−31}	transit	1,023±4	1.17±0.14	5,603±47	
TOI-1298b	0.356±0.032	0.841±0.021	4.537164±0.000012	0.0590±0.0023	1,388±24	transit	1,041±7	1.44±0.10	5,889±43	
TOI-1333 b	2.37±0.24	1.396^{+0.056}_{−0.054}	4.720219±0.000011	0.0626^{+0.0011}_{−0.0012}	1,679^{+35}_{−34}	transit	653	1.464^{+0.076}_{−0.079}	6,274±97	Host star also known as BD+47 3521A.
TOI-1431 b	3.14^{+0.19}_{−0.18}	1.51±0.06	2.65022±0.00001	0.047±0.002	2,370±100	transit	488±3	1.90^{+0.10}_{−0.08}	7,690^{+400}_{−250}	Also known as MASCARA-5b
TOI-1444 b	0.0122±0.0022	0.125±0.006	0.4702694±0.0000044	0.1288^{+0.0021}_{−0.0022}	330	transit	408.9±0.5	0.934±0.038	5,430±90	
TOI-1478 b	0.847^{+0.052}_{−0.048}	1.061^{+0.040}_{−0.038}	10.180249±0.000015	0.0903^{+0.0018}_{−0.0013}	918±11	transit	498	0.946^{+0.059}_{−0.041}	5,595^{+83}_{−81}	
TOI-1518 b	2.3	1.875±0.053	1.902603±0.000011	0.0389±0.0011	3,237±59	transit	742±6	1.79±0.26	7,300±100	
TOI-1601 b	0.99±0.11	1.239^{+0.046}_{−0.039}	5.331751±0.000011	0.06864^{+0.00079}_{−0.00075}	1,619^{+24}_{−23}	transit	1,096	1.517^{+0.053}_{−0.049}	5,948^{+87}_{−89}	
TOI-1634 b	0.0313±0.0030	0.158±0.007	0.9893457±0.0000034	0.01491±0.00015	921±21	transit	114.40±0.08	0.452±0.014	3,472±48	
TOI-1685 b	0.0121±0.030	0.131±0.006	0.6691425±0.0000037	0.01156±0.00009	1,052±21	transit	122.68±0.09	0.495±0.019	3,434±51	Host star also known as UCAC4 666-026266
TOI-1685 c	0.0290±0.0065		9.025^{+0.104}_{−0.119}		449.1±6.9	radial vel.	122.68±0.09	0.495±0.019	3,434±51	Unconfirmed
TOI-1749 b	0.060^{+0.07}_{−0.04}	0.124±0.018	2.388821^{+0.000057}_{−0.000073}	0.0291±0.0005	831±18	transit	324.8±0.4	0.58±0.03	3,985±55	
TOI-1749 c	0.007^{+0.018}_{−0.005}	0.189±0.011	4.489010^{+0.000040}_{−0.000061}	0.0443±0.0008	673±15	transit	324.8±0.4	0.58±0.03	3,985±55	
TOI-1749 d	0.014^{+0.020}_{−0.011}	0.225±0.013	9.04455±0.00012	0.0707±0.0012	533±12	transit	324.8±0.4	0.58±0.03	3,985±55	
TOI-1789 b	0.70±0.16	1.40^{+0.22}_{−0.13}	3.208666±0.000016	0.04873^{+0.00065}_{−0.0016}	1,929^{+28}_{−18}	transit	729±3	1.499^{+0.061}_{−0.15}	5,984^{+55}_{−57}	
TOI-1807 b	0.0071^{+0.0015}_{−0.0018}	0.165±0.004	0.549372±0.000007	0.0135^{+0.0013}_{−0.0022}	1499^{+82}_{−129}	transit	133.88±0.25	0.750^{+0.025}_{−0.024}	4757^{+51}_{−50}	Star is co-moving with TOI-2076
TOI-1842b	0.214^{+0.040}_{−0.038}	1.04^{+0.06}_{−0.05}	9.5739^{+0.0002}_{−0.0001}	0.01001±0.0007		transit	729±7	1.46±0.03	6230±50	
TOI-2076 b		0.293±0.038	10.35566±0.00006	0.0631±0.0027	870±13	transit	136.70±0.23	0.850^{+0.025}_{−0.026}	5187^{+54}_{−53}	Star is co-moving with TOI-1807
TOI-2076 c		0.396±0.004	21.01538^{+0.00084}_{−0.00074}	0.0885±0.0038	734±11	transit	136.70±0.23	0.850^{+0.025}_{−0.026}	5187^{+54}_{−53}	Star is co-moving with TOI-1807
TOI-2076 d		0.370±0.006	25.0893±0.01	0.1138^{+0.0048}_{−0.0049}	648±10	transit	136.70±0.23	0.850^{+0.025}_{−0.026}	5187^{+54}_{−53}	Star is co-moving with TOI-1807
TOI-2109b	5.02±0.75	1.347±0.047	0.67247414±0.00000028	0.01791±0.00065	3631±69	transit	846±9	1.447^{+0.075}_{−0.078}	6530^{+160}_{−150}	
TOI-2184 b	0.65±0.16	1.017±0.051	6.90683±0.00009			transit	2,515±22	1.53±0.12	5,966±136	
TOI-2202 b	0.927^{+0.047}_{−0.048}	1.01^{+0.522}_{−0.080}	11.9108^{+0.0009}_{−0.0009}	0.0956^{+0.0015}_{−0.0016}		transit	770±3	0.823^{+0.027}_{−0.023}	5,144±50	
TOI-2202 c	0.191^{+0.033}_{−0.030}		24.7545^{+0.0073}_{−0.0078}	0.1558^{+0.0025}_{−0.0026}		timing	770±3	0.823^{+0.027}_{−0.023}	5,144±50	
TOI-2257 b		0.196±0.010	35.189346	0.145±0.003	256^{+61}_{−17}	transit	188.5±0.3	0.33±0.02	3430±130	Habitable zone planet
TOI-2285b		0.155±0.007	27.26955^{+0.00013}_{−0.00010}	0.1363±0.0010	284±6	transit	138.34±0.14	0.454±0.010	3,491±58	
TOI-2406b	0.0286^{+0.0223}_{−0.0126}	0.263^{+0.015}_{−0.014}	3.0766896±0.0000065	0.0228±0.0016	447±15	transit	181.4±0.4	0.162±0.008	3,100±75	
TOI-3362b	5.029^{+0.668}_{−0.646}	1.142^{+0.043}_{−0.041}	18.09547±0.00003	0.153^{+0.002}_{−0.003}		transit	1,198±18	1.445^{+0.069}_{−0.073}	6,532^{+88}_{−86}	High eccentricity orbit
Upsilon Leonis b	0.51^{+0.06}_{−0.26}		385.2^{+2.8}_{−1.3}	1.18^{+0.11}_{−0.32}		radial vel.	177.8	1.48^{+0.90}_{−0.38}	4836	

== Former candidate ==
YSES 2 b had been thought to be a planet after the discovery by direct imaging. Later analysis in 2025 showed that it is a background M-dwarf star instead.

== Specific exoplanet lists ==
Lists of exoplanets

- List of directly imaged exoplanets
- List of exoplanet extremes
- List of exoplanet firsts
- List of exoplanets discovered by the Kepler space telescope
- List of exoplanets observed during Kepler's K2 mission
- List of exoplanets discovered by the TESS mission
- List of extrasolar candidates for liquid water
- List of terrestrial exoplanet candidates for atmosphere detection
- List of hottest exoplanets
- List of coldest exoplanets
- List of multiplanetary systems
- List of circumbinary planets
- List of nearest exoplanets
- List of nearest terrestrial exoplanet candidates
- List of potentially habitable exoplanets
- List of proper names of exoplanets
- List of largest exoplanets
- List of smallest exoplanets
- List of transiting exoplanets
- List of exoplanets and planetary debris around giant stars
- List of exoplanets and planetary debris around white dwarfs
- List of extrasolar planetary collisions

=== Lists of exoplanets by year of discovery ===
- List of exoplanets discovered before 2000 (31)
- List of exoplanets discovered between 2000–2009 (375)
- List of exoplanets discovered in 2010 (109)
- List of exoplanets discovered in 2011 (179)
- List of exoplanets discovered in 2012 (149)
- List of exoplanets discovered in 2013 (149)
- List of exoplanets discovered in 2014 (869)
- List of exoplanets discovered in 2015 (144)
- List of exoplanets discovered in 2016 (1498)
- List of exoplanets discovered in 2017 (152)
- List of exoplanets discovered in 2018 (300)
- List of exoplanets discovered in 2019 (169)
- List of exoplanets discovered in 2020 (256)
- List of exoplanets discovered in 2021 (253)
- List of exoplanets discovered in 2022 (312)
- List of exoplanets discovered in 2023 (304)
- List of exoplanets discovered in 2024 (284)
- List of exoplanets discovered in 2025 (138)
- List of exoplanets discovered in 2026 (158)
