= List of transiting exoplanets =

This is a list of notable transiting extrasolar planets sorted by orbital periods. As of 2026, 6,160 confirmed exoplanets have been discovered. This list consist of all transiting exoplanets through 2012, and notable discoveries since. All the transiting planets have true masses, radii and most have known inclinations. Radius is determined by how much the star dims during the transit and inclination is determined from Rossiter–McLaughlin effect. True mass is determined by the minimum mass determined from radial velocity observations divided by the sine of inclination.

== List ==
Red rows denote formerly transiting planets.

Yellow rows denote members of a multi-planet system.

Planet	Mass (M_{J})	Radius (R_{J})	Density (g/cm^{3})	Temperature (K)	Period (d)	Semi-major axis (AU)	Eccentricity	Inclination (°)	Year of discovery	Notes
TOI-2535 b	0.472	0.844			8.236	0.0993	0.19	90.76	2026	Formerly transiting planet; first transiting planet discovered that moved to a non-transiting configuration
TOI-6883 b	4.34	1.087		805.5	16.25	0.129			2024
SPECULOOS-3 b		0.07273		553	0.719	0.00733			2024
IRAS 04125+2902 b	0.3	0.958			8.83				2024
HD 63433 d		0.09573		1040	4.21	0.0503			2024
WASP-193b	0.139	1.464		1254	6.2463345	0.0676			2023
TOI-5678 b	0.063	0.438		513	47.73022	0.249			2023
TOI-4603 b	12.89	1.042		1677	7.24599	0.0888			2023
TOI-4127 b	2.30	1.096		605.1	56.39879	0.3081			2023
TOI-3235 b	0.665	1.017		604	2.59261842	0.02709			2023
TOI-715 b		0.1383		234	19.288004	0.0830			2023
TOI-700 e	0.0025730809	0.08502		350	27.80978	0.134			2023
TOI-672 b	0.0760	0.470		676.15	3.633575				2023
LHS 475 b	0.002876	0.0883		586	2.029088	0.0206			2023
K2-415b	0.0094	0.091		412	4.0179694	0.0270			2023
TOI-2180 b	2.755	1.010		348	260.79	0.828			2022
TOI-1452 b	0.0152	0.149		326	11.06201	0.061			2022
Kepler-1708b	<4.6	0.8886			737.11310	1.64			2022
TOI-2257 b		0.196		256	35.189346	0.145			2021
TOI-1601 b	0.99	1.239		1619	5.331751	0.06864			2021
TOI-1478 b	0.847	1.061		918	10.180249	0.0903			2021
TOI-1431 b	3.14	1.51		2370	2.65022	0.047			2021
TOI-1227 b		0.854			27.36397	0.0886			2021
TOI-640 b	0.88	1.771		1749	5.0037775	0.06608			2021
TOI-628 b	6.33	1.060		1586	3.4095675	0.04860			2021
TOI-178c	0.015	0.149		873	3.238450	0.0370			2021
TOI-4138 b	0.67	1.49		1762	3.660028	0.051			2021
NGTS-14Ab	0.092	0.444		1143	3.5357173	0.0403			2021
NGTS-13b	4.84	1.142		1605	4.12	0.0549			2021
Kepler-1704b	4.15	1.065		253.8	988.88113	2.026			2021
Gliese 367 b	0.0017	0.064		1745	0.321962	0.0071			2021
TOI-849 b	0.128	0.308		1800	0.7655240	0.01598			2020
TOI-813 b		0.599		610	83.8911	0.423			2020
TOI-700 d	0.00711	0.1062		295	37.426	0.163			2020
TOI-561 b	0.0050	0.127			0.446578	0.01055			2020
K2-315b		0.085		460	3.1443189	0.0234			2020
K2-137b	<0.5	0.057		1471	0.179719	0.0058	0	93.10	2017	Shortest period of a transiting exoplanet
Kepler-42c	<0.006	0.065		720	0.45328509	0.006	0		2012
55 Cancri e	0.027	0.194	4.905		0.7365449	0.0156	0.057	81	2004
Kepler-32f		0.073			0.74296	0.01652	0.0126		2012
WASP-19b	1.152	1.310	0.593	2009	0.788840	0.0164	0.0234	99.206	2009
WASP-43b	1.782	0.930	2.938		0.813475	0.0142	0.0076	82.657	2011
Kepler-10b	0.014	0.127	8.849	1833	0.837495	0.0168	0.0003	95.567	2011
CoRoT-7b	0.0151	0.15	5.275	1656	0.853585	0.0172	0	80.1	2009
WASP-18b	10.425	1.165	7.724		0.941452	0.0204	0.0088	85.962	2009
WTS-1b	0.504	0.916	0.759		1.083904	0.0185	0.0082	81.251	2012
WASP-12b	1.389	1.834	0.260	2525	1.091423	0.0229	0.0490	96.927	2008
OGLE-TR-56b	1.316	1.300	0.700	1973	1.211909	0.0235	0.0012	101.205	2003	First planet discovered by the transit method.
HAT-P-23b	2.087	1.368	0.952		1.212884	0.0232	0.1059	85.059	2010
Kepler-42b	<0.009	0.07		519	1.2137672	0.0116	0		2012
Kelt-1b	27.23	1.11			1.217514	0.02466			2012	Most massive transiting exoplanet, possibly a brown star
WASP-33b	3.841	1.497	1.325		1.219867	0.0255	0.0374	87.670	2010
TrES-3b	1.924	1.295	1.036		1.306190	0.0226	0.0166	98.275	2007
HAT-P-36b	1.832	1.264			1.327347	0.0238	0.063	86	2012
Qatar-2b	2.487	1.144			1.3371182	0.02149	0	88.3	2011
WASP-4b	1.122	1.363	0.587	1653	1.338228	0.0231	0.0025	88.751	2007
WASP-77Ab	1.667	1.23		1715	1.36002854	0.02335	00.0074		2012
Qatar-1b	1.090	1.164	0.803		1.420033	0.0234	0.0028	96.535	2010
WASP-46b	2.101	1.310	1.238		1.430370	0.0245	0.0007	82.629	2011
OGLE-TR-113b	1.317	1.090	1.205		1.432476	0.0229	0.0064	90.574	2004
TrES-5b	1.778	1.209			1.4822446	0.02446	0	84.529	2011
Kepler-17b	2.45	1.31	1.35	1570	1.4857108	0.02591	<0.011	87.2	2011
CoRoT-1b	1.03	1.49	0.413	1898	1.5089557	0.0254	0	85.1	2007
CoRoT-14b	7.6	1.09	6.886		1.51214	0.027	0	79.6	2010
WASP-36b	2.447	1.373	1.160		1.547288	0.0277	0.0384	88.785	2010
WASP-64b	1.271	1.271		1689	1.5732918	0.02648	0		2012
GJ 1214 b	0.021	0.245	1.745	516	1.580393	0.0142	0.0982	88.619	2009
Kepler-9d	0.022	0.147	9.460		1.592851	0.0267	0.0109	87.666	2010
WASP-64b	1.2	0.7			1.6				2011
WASP-5b	1.637	1.171	1.206	1732	1.628425	0.0273	0.0032	85.779	2007
OGLE-TR-132b	1.144	1.175	0.834		1.689868	0.0300	0.0032	95.209	2004
WASP-52b	0.5	1.3			1.7				2011
CoRoT-2b	3.673	1.545	1.321	1537	1.742996	0.0294	0.0083	92.157	2007
KOI-13b	8.3	1.83			1.7637				2011
SWEEPS-11b	9.665	1.135	8.047		1.795546	0.0289	0.0124	86.045	2006
WASP-3b	2.060	1.454	0.797	1983	1.846837	0.0317	0.0020	85.064	2007
Kepler-41b	0.49	0.841	1.02	1930	1.855558	0.029	0	88.3	2011
Kepler-42d	<0.003	0.051		450	1.856169	0.0154	0		2012	Least massive and smallest transiting exoplanet
CoRoT-18b	3.47	1.31	2.05		1.9000693	0.0295	<0.08	86.5	2011
WASP-50b	1.468	1.153			1.9550959	0.02945	0.009	44	2011
WASP-48b	0.977	1.671	0.277		2.143634	0.0344	0.0177	80.088	2011
HAT-P-32b	0.941	2.037			2.150009	0.0344	0.163	52	2011	Largest transiting exoplanet
WASP-2b	0.847	1.079	0.801	1300	2.152225	0.0308	0.0089	95.197	2006
HAT-P-7b	1.802	1.421	0.755	2729	2.204730	0.0377	0.0524	95.891	2008
HD 189733 b	1.127	1.138	0.901	1117	2.218573	0.0309	0.0059	85.756	2005
WASP-14b	7.725	1.259	4.759	2779	2.243770	0.0368	0.0903	95.205	2008
WASP-65b	1.6	1.3			2.3				2011
WASP-24b	1.032	1.104	0.897		2.341208	0.0359	0.0378	83.644	2010
WASP-44b	0.889	1.144	0.787		2.423804	0.0347	0.0009	86.022	2011
KOI-254b	0.505	0.96	0.8	1000	2.455239	0.030	0.11	87.0	2012
TrES-2b	1.199	1.272	0.687		2.470627	0.0356	0.0277	96.375	2006
OGLE2-TR-L9b	4.336	1.614	1.253		2.485534	0.0413	0.0178	97.526	2008
WASP-1b	0.859	1.484	0.310	1833	2.519945	0.0389	0.0067	96.077	2006
XO-2b	0.573	0.973	0.742		2.615838	0.0369	0.0325	91.208	2007
Gliese 436 b	0.0737	0.365	2.01		2.6438986	0.02887	0.12	85.8	2004
WASP-32b	3.601	1.183	2.653		2.718650	0.0394	0.0179	94.663	2010
CoRoT-21b	2.26	1.3	1.36		2.72474	0.0417	0	86.8	2011
WASP-26b	1.027	1.316	0.536		2.756601	0.0399	0.0019	82.513	2010
HAT-P-16b	4.193	1.289	2.316		2.775962	0.0413	0.0358	93.411	2010
Kepler-21b	<0.033	0.1459	<12.9	1956	2.785755	0.0425	0	82.58	2011
HAT-P-5b	1.06	1.274	0.390		2.788491	0.0407	0.0141	86.753	2007
HAT-P-37b	1.169	1.169			2.797436	0.0379	0.058	86.9	2012
WASP-49b	0.4	1.3			2.8				2011
WASP-57b	0.8	1.1			2.8				2011
HAT-P-31b/WASP-51b	0.711	1.34			2.810595	0.0419	0.0089	83.6	2011
CoRoT-12b	0.917	1.44	0.407		2.828042	0.04016	0.07	85.48	2010
HAT-P-20b	7.246	0.867	13.809		2.875317	0.0361	0.0272	86.467	2010
HD 149026 b	0.360	0.813	0.811	2359	2.875889	0.0437	0.0073	83.345	2005
HAT-P-3b	0.591	0.827	1.386		2.899703	0.0387	0.0021	87.074	2007
HAT-P-13b	0.851	1.284	0.484		2.916293	0.0427	0.0142	96.726	2009
WASP-23b	0.875	0.963	1.146		2.937160	0.0379	0.0003	84.436	2010
CoRoT-11b	2.33	1.43	1.057		2.99433	0.0436	0	83.17	2010
KOI-135b	3.23	1.2	2.33	1637	3.024095	0.0449	< 0.025		2011
TrES-1b	0.613	1.081	0.573	1063	3.030065	0.0392	0.0570	88.410	2004
HAT-P-27b/WASP-40b	0.617	1.055	0.797		3.039572	0.0399	0.0007	84.983	2011
WASP-41b	0.923	1.211	0.611		3.052394	0.0405	0.0002	92.664	2010
HAT-P-4b	0.599	0.890	1.027		3.056536	0.0445	0.0165	89.923	2007
HAT-P-8b	1.341	1.497	0.530		3.076337	0.0449	0.0201	92.227	2008
WASP-10b	3.058	1.078	2.962		3.092762	0.0371	0.0568	86.838	2008
OGLE-TR-10b	0.626	1.263	0.369		3.101286	0.0439	0.0026	95.495	2002
WASP-16b	0.855	1.008	1.013		3.118601	0.0421	0.0023	94.782	2009
WASP-45b	1.007	1.157	0.863		3.126088	0.0405	0.0008	84.470	2011
WASP-35b	0.722	1.324	0.412		3.161575	0.0432	0.0027	87.960	2011
XO-3b	11.791	1.217	8.600		3.191524	0.0452	0.2576	84.215	2007
HAT-P-22b	2.147	1.081	2.078		3.212220	0.0415	0.0274	91.267	2010
HAT-P-12b	0.211	0.959	0.281		3.213060	0.0385	0.0516	88.946	2009
Kepler-4b	0.077	0.357	2.050	1647	3.213457	0.0456	0.0038	89.757	2010
Kepler-6b	0.669	1.323	0.354	1661	3.234230	0.0456	0.0186	86.813	2010
HAT-P-24b	0.685	1.242	0.422		3.355240	0.0465	0.0671	88.628	2010
WASP-6b	0.504	1.224	0.327	1293	3.361006	0.0418	0.0540	88.466	2008
WASP-31b	0.478	1.537	0.155		3.405909	0.0465	0.0013	84.542	2010
WASP-28b	0.910	1.117	0.785		3.408821	0.0455	0.0463	89.100	2010
HAT-P-33b	0.763	1.827			3.474474	0.0503	0.148	86.7	2011
Kepler-18b	0.0217	0.179	4.9	1179	3.504725	0.0447	0	84.92	2011
Kepler-8b	0.603	1.419	0.259	1764	3.522540	0.0483	0.0892	95.932	2010
HD 209458 b	0.685	1.325	0.369	1129	3.524749	0.0454	0.0709	86.677	1999	First exoplanet observed to transit its parent star
WASP-22b	0.565	1.122	0.471		3.532687	0.0467	0.0229	89.245	2010
Kepler-5b	2.114	1.431	0.882	1928	3.548465	0.0506	0.0071	86.282	2010
TrES-4b	0.919	1.799	0.193	1782	3.553945	0.0487	0.0136	82.857	2006
WASP-37b	1.696	1.136	1.369		3.577471	0.0434	0.0043	88.779	2010
CoRoT-23b	2.8	1.05	3.21		3.6314	0.0477	0.16	85.7	2011
HAT-P-35b	1.054	1.332			3.646706	0.0498	0.025	87.3	2012
HAT-P-25b	0.567	1.190	0.397		3.652836	0.0466	0.0322	87.561	2010
OGLE-TR-211b	0.918	1.329	0.481		3.677240	0.0509	0.0689	92.831	2007
Kepler-20b	0.027	0.170	6.5	1024	3.6961219	0.04537	<0.32	86.50	2011
WASP-54b	0.6	1.4			3.7				2011
WASP-70b	0.6	0.8			3.7				2011
WASP-11b/HAT-P-10b	0.462	1.035	0.500	1030	3.722469	0.0440	0.1710	88.509	2008
WASP-17b	0.491	1.736	0.114		3.735442	0.0500	0.1286	92.246	2009
WASP-15b	0.542	1.428	0.229	1496	3.752066	0.0500	0.0236	94.526	2008
WASP-25b	0.578	1.258	0.343		3.764831	0.0473	0.0216	87.704	2010
CoRoT-17b	2.449	1.023	3.037		3.768125	0.0475	0.0004	91.660	2010
WASP-61b	1.7	1.4			3.8				2011
HAT-P-6b	1.055	1.264	0.650		3.852985	0.0523	0.0024	85.505	2007
CoRoT-19b	1.11	1.45	0.48		3.89713	0.0518	0.047	87.61	2011
WASP-69b	0.3	1			3.9				2011
Lupus-TR-3b	0.712	0.932	1.090		3.914049	0.0463	0.2178	91.736	2007
WASP-29b	0.244	0.792	0.584		3.922727	0.0456	0.0273	91.237	2010
HAT-P-9b	0.671	1.398	0.555		3.922814	0.0528	0.0012	86.467	2008
XO-1b	0.937	1.184	0.678		3.941534	0.0489	0.0110	90.690	2006
OGLE-TR-182b	1.008	1.132	0.844		3.979100	0.0519	0.0114	94.280	2007
WASP-20b	0.3	0.9			4				2011
HAT-P-19b	0.292	1.133	0.232		4.008778	0.0466	0.0674	88.235	2010
OGLE-TR-111b	0.529	1.022	0.603		4.014448	0.0463	0.0049	91.900	2004
CoRoT-13b	1.308	0.885	2.503		4.03519	0.051	0	88.02	2010
CoRoT-5b	0.856	1.211	0.577		4.037896	0.0496	0.0935	85.833	2008
WASP-39b	0.277	1.267	0.181	1116	4.05526	0.0486	0.0057	87.833	2011
WASP-47b	1.1	1.2			4.1				2011
WASP-66b	1.9	1.5			4.1				2011
HAT-P-21b	4.063	1.024	4.588		4.124461	0.0495	0.0477	87.484	2010
XO-4b	1.721	1.338	0.893		4.125020	0.0552	0.0025	88.680	2008
XO-5b	1.151	1.154	0.937		4.187754	0.0487	0.0029	93.164	2008
SWEEPS-04b	3.653	0.814	8.672		4.201572	0.0547	0.0219	92.090	2006
HAT-P-26b	0.059	0.565	0.431		4.234516	0.0479	0.1244	88.582	2010
CoRoT-3b	21.66	1.01	26.4		4.2568	0.057	0	85.9	2008	Most dense transiting exoplanet
WASP-60b	0.5	0.9			4.3				2011
WASP-34b	0.591	1.218	0.378		4.317678	0.0521	0.0382	85.201	2010
WASP-21b	0.301	1.067	0.296		4.322482	0.0520	0.0029	91.250	2010
WASP-13b	0.457	1.209	0.313	1403	4.352977	0.0546	0.0147	93.073	2008
WASP-62b	0.5	1.5			4.4				2011
WASP-63b	0.3	1			4.4				2011
Kepler-12b	0.431	1.695	0.111	1361	4.4379637	0.0556	<0.01	88.76	2011	Least dense transiting exoplanet
HAT-P-1b	0.590	1.355	0.292		4.465293	0.0552	0.0904	85.896	2006
WASP-55b	0.6	1.4			4.5				2011
WASP-56b	0.6	1.2			4.5				2011
WASP-67b	0.4	1.7			4.5				2011
HAT-P-14b	2.232	1.199	1.647		4.627657	0.0606	0.0948	97.152	2010
HAT-P-38b	0.267	0.825			4.640382	0.0523	0.067	88.3	2012
Kepler-93b	0.013	0.132	6.88	1037	4.726740	0.05343	0	89.18	2014
Kepler-7b	0.433	1.478	0.160	1541	4.885525	0.0622	0.3764	86.529	2010
HAT-P-11b	0.081	0.452	1.076	878	4.887816	0.0525	0.1980	91.496	2009
Kepler-15b	0.66	0.96	0.93	1111	4.942782	0.05714	0.06	87.44	2011
WASP-7b	0.960	0.915	1.515	1997	4.954658	0.0617	0.0323	90.370	2008
WASP-42b	0.6	1			5				2011
WASP-58b	1.1	1.3			5				2011
HAT-P-31b	2.171	1.07			5.005425	0.055	0.245	87.1	2011
WASP-68b	0.8	0.9			5.1				2011
CoRoT-16b	0.497	0.813	1.118		5.353421	0.0578	0.0292	94.178	2010
HAT-P-34b	3.328	1.107			5.452654	0.0677	0.441	87.1	2012
HAT-P-18b	0.197	0.995	0.232		5.508023	0.0560	0.0842	91.201	2010
HAT-P-2b	9.090	1.157	7.522	1187	5.633473	0.0676	0.5171	86.722	2007
Kepler-33b		0.16			5.66793	0.0677		86.39	2012
HAT-P-29b	0.778	1.107			5.72318	0.0667	0.095	87.1	2011
Kepler-32b	4.1	0.37		542	5.90124	0.05			2012
Kepler-28b	<1.51	0.32			5.9123	0.062			2012
Kepler-20e	<0.005	0.077		1040	6.098493	0.0507	<0.28	87.50	2011
COROT-8b	0.222	0.572	1.436		6.212295	0.0634	0.0043	88.435	2010
Kepler-25b	<12.7	0.23			6.2385	0.068			2012
Kepler-14b	8.40	1.136	7.1		6.7901230		0.035	90.0	2011
WASP-38b	2.712	1.079	2.746	1292	6.871815	0.0755	0.0321	88.692	2010
Kepler-40b	2.217	1.175	1.824	1618	6.873495	0.0807	0.0039	89.716	2010
Kepler-23b	<0.8	0.17			7.1073	0.075			2012
Kepler-223e		0.18			7.3831	0.076			2011
Kepler-18c	0.054	0.489	0.59	909	7.64159	0.0752	0	87.68	2011
WASP-59b	0.7	0.9			7.9				2011
Kepler-24b	<1.6	0.21			8.1453				2012
WASP-8b	2.233	1.172	1.749		8.158716	0.0742	0.3082	88.516	2008
Kepler-32c	0.5	0.33		475	8.7522	0.09			2012
CoRoT-6b	2.959	1.166	2.319		8.886903	0.0855	0.0278	94.581	2009
Kepler-28c	<1.36	0.3			8.9858	0.081			2012
CoRoT-20b	4.24	0.84	9.49		9.20	0.0902	0.562	88.21	2011
CoRoT-4b	0.728	1.168	0.561	1074	9.202047	0.0887	0.0019	89.779	2008
Kepler-19b	<0.06	0.2	<7.76	714	9.2869944	0.0853	0	89.94	2011
HD 97658 b	0.02	0.262			9.4957	0.0797	0.13		2010
KOI-730c		0.23			9.8499		0.092		2011
KIC 10905746 b		0.237			9.8844		88.42		2011
Kepler-11b	0.014	0.176	3.280		10.303751	0.0912	0.0025	88.505	2011
Kepler-29b	0.4	0.32		815	10.3376	0.09			2012
HAT-P-17b	0.526	1.011	0.636	814	10.338520	0.0882	0.3455	89.182	2010
Kepler-23c	<2.7	0.29			10.7421	0.099			2012
Kepler-20c	0.051	0.273	2.91	713	10.854092	0.0930	<0.40	88.39	2011
HAT-P-15b	1.946	1.072	1.936		10.863502	0.0964	0.1898	89.054	2010
Kepler-26b	<0.38	0.32			12.2829	0.085			2012
Kepler-24c	<1.6	0.25			12.3335	0.106			2012
Kepler-25c	<4.16	0.4			12.7204	0.11			2012
Kepler-11c	0.043	0.282	2.519		13.025021	0.1064	0.0076	88.986	2011
Kepler-33c		0.29			13.17562	0.1189		89.46	2012
CoRoT-10b	2.75	0.97	3.997		13.2406	0.1055	0.53	88.55	2010
Kepler-29c	0.3	0.26		749	13.2907	0.11			2012
KOI-730b		0.31			14.7903	0.12			2011
Kepler-18d	0.051	0.62	0.27	728	14.85888	0.1172	0	88.07	2011
Kepler-27b	<9.11	0.36			15.3348	0.118			2012
Kepler-9b	0.252	0.842	0.536		19.243158	0.1405	0.0297	88.553	2010
Kepler-20f	<0.010	0.092		705	19.57706	0.1104	<0.32	88.68	2011
Kepler-223d		0.25			19.7216	0.145			2011
Kepler-31b	<6.8	0.38		776	20.8613				2012
Mulchatna	3.125	1.095	3.065		21.214398	0.1626	0.6696	86.486	2007
Kepler-33d		0.48			21.77596	0.1662		88.71	2012
Kepler-11d	0.019	0.307	0.882		22.687189	0.1586	0.0044	90.713	2011
Kepler-30b	0.2	0.33		548	29.329	0.18			2012
Kepler-27c	<13.8	0.44			31.3309	0.191			2012
Kepler-33e		0.36			31.7844	0.2138		89.576	2012
Kepler-11e	0.026	0.404	0.531		31.995899	0.1935	0.0065	88.788	2011
Kepler-9c	0.171	0.823	0.393		38.908610	0.2246	0.0337	88.124	2010
Kepler-33f		0.4			41.02902	0.2535		89.772	2012
Kepler-31c	4.7	0.38		612	42.6318	0.26			2012
Kepler-10c	<0.063	0.199	<10	485	45.29485	0.2407		89.65	2011
Kepler-11f	0.007	0.234	0.754		46.688756	0.2501	0.0018	90.614	2011
Kepler-943b		0.72			49.76971	0.2672		89.2	2011
Kepler-30c	9.1	1.29		431	60.3251	0.30			2012
Kepler-20d	<0.063	0.245	<4.07	369	77.61184	0.3453	<0.60	89.570	2011
Kepler-991b		0.227			82.5342519				2016
CoRoT-9b	0.838	1.045	0.945	377	95.273774	0.4070	0.1127	37.383	2010
HD 80606 b	3.945	1.029	4.741	347	111.436366	0.4309	0.9337	89.285	2001
Kepler-11g	0.019	0.327	0.725		118.377738	0.4617	0.0097	89.754	2011
Kepler-35b	0.127	0.728	0.410		131.458	0.60347	0.042	90.76	2012
PH1b	0.531	.551		481	138.317	0.652	0.0702	90.050	2012
Kepler-30d	17	0.96		323	143.213	0.5			2012
Kepler-16b	0.333	0.7538	0.964	170-200	228.776	0.7048	0.0069	90.0322	2011
Kepler-34b	0.22	0.764	0.410		288.822	1.0896	0.182	90.355	2012
Kepler-22b	<0.11	0.212	<14.7	262	289.8623	0.849	0	89.764	2011
Kepler-1647b	1.06	1.52			1107	2.7205	0.0581	90.1	2016
EPIC 248847494 b	<13	1.11		183	3650	4.5	0	89.87	2018	Longest period of a transiting exoplanet
Kepler-560b		0.153							2016
Kepler-1649b									2017
Kepler-1649c									2020
Kepler-1662b									2020
Kepler-1652b									2017
Kepler-1514b									2016
Kepler-1514c									2020
Kepler-1544b		0.159							2016

== See also ==
- Lists of exoplanets
- List of exoplanets discovered by the Kepler space telescope, a list of exoplanets found by the Kepler space telescope which detects transiting exoplanets.

== External links and references ==
- "Transiting planets". Extrasolar Planets Encyclopaedia. 1995.
- "Exoplanets Data Explorer".
