= YSES =

YSES (pronounced "wai-ses" by the scientists involved) is an acronym meaning "Young Suns Exoplanet Survey", a research project to find and characterize exoplanets around young stars.

Wikipedia articles related to this subject include:

- YSES 1, a star in the constellation Musca, which produced the first-ever direct image of multiple bodies orbiting a Sun-like star
- YSES 2, a star in the constellation Musca
- YSES 2b, a star in the constellation Musca
