= Polar orbit =

Satellite orbit with high inclination

Polar orbit on the Earth

A polar orbit is one in which a satellite passes above or nearly above both poles of the body being orbited (usually a planet such as the Earth, but possibly another body such as the Moon or Sun) on each revolution. It has an inclination of about 80–90 degrees to the body's equator.

Launching satellites into polar orbit requires a larger launch vehicle to launch a given payload to a given altitude than for a near-equatorial orbit at the same altitude, because it cannot take advantage of the Earth's rotational velocity. Depending on the location of the launch site and the inclination of the polar orbit, the launch vehicle may lose up to 460 m/s of Delta-v, approximately 5% of the Delta-v required to attain Low Earth orbit.

== Usage ==
Polar orbits are used for Earth-mapping, reconnaissance satellites, as well as for some weather satellites. The Iridium satellite constellation uses a polar orbit to provide telecommunications services.

Near-polar orbiting satellites commonly choose a sun-synchronous orbit, where each successive orbital pass occurs at the same local time of day. For some applications, such as remote sensing, it is important that changes over time are not aliased by changes in local time. Keeping the same local time on a given pass requires that the time period of the orbit be kept as short, which requires a low orbit. However, very low orbits rapidly decay due to drag from the atmosphere. Commonly used altitudes are between 700 and 800 km, producing an orbital period of about 100 minutes. The half-orbit on the Sun side then takes only 50 minutes, during which local time of day does not vary greatly.

To retain a Sun-synchronous orbit as the Earth revolves around the Sun during the year, the orbit must precess about the Earth at the same rate (which is not possible if the satellite passes directly over the pole). Because of Earth's equatorial bulge, an orbit inclined at a slight angle is subject to a torque, which causes precession. An angle of about 8° from the pole produces the desired precession in a 100-minute orbit.

== Exoplanets ==
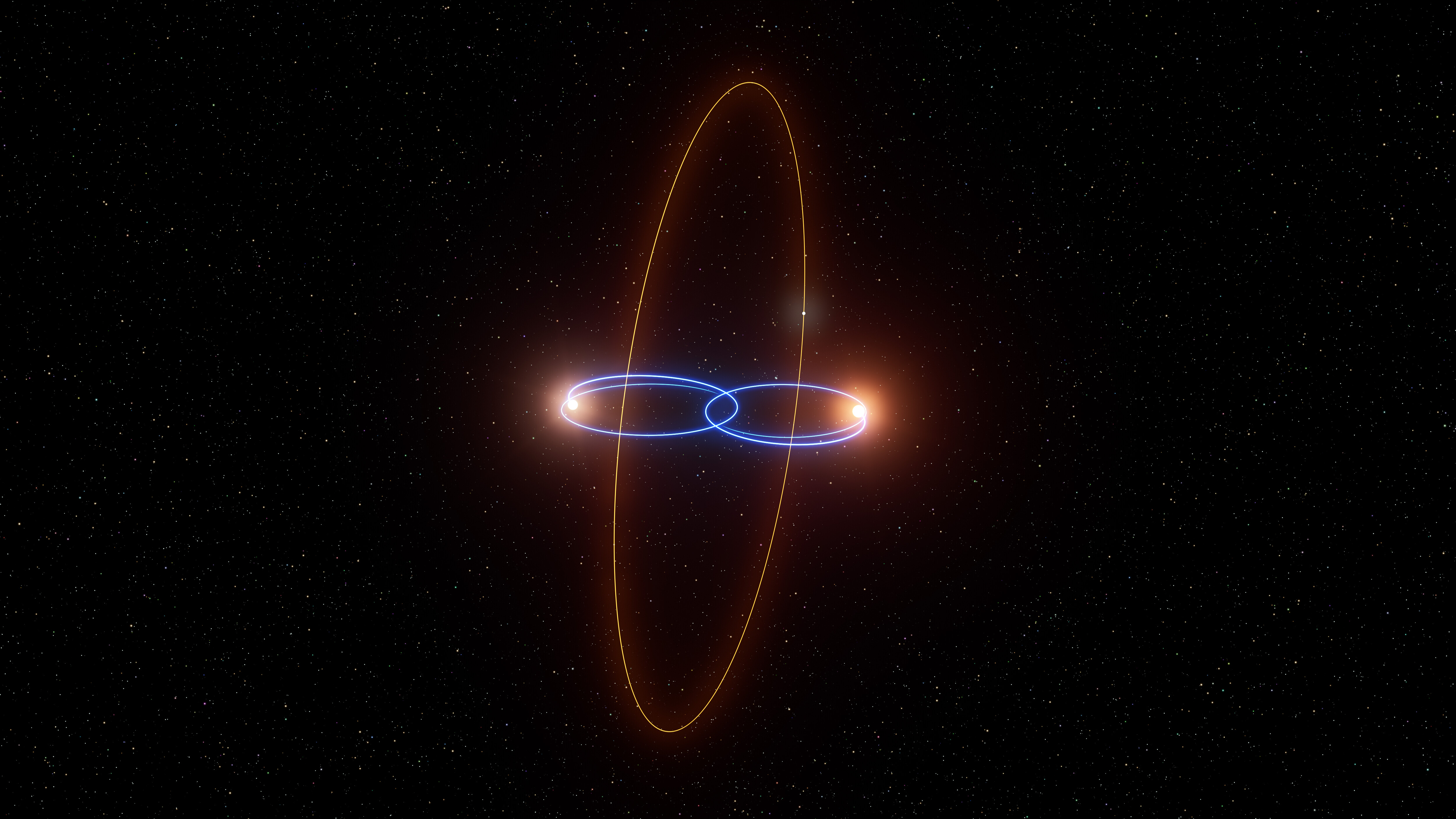
Orbit of the planet (orange orbit) around the brown dwarf binary 2M1510AB (blue orbits).

A misalignment between host star rotation plane and orbital plane of the planet is called obliquity and is usually measured with the Rossiter-McLaughlin effect. Around 10% of exoplanets have a misalignment between 80 and 125°. About half of these are warm Neptune sized or super-Neptune sized planets. Examples of exoplanets with nearly polar orbits are GJ 3470b, TOI-858Bb, WASP-178b, HD 3167c+d, TOI-640b, MASCARA-1 b, and GJ 436b.

One explanation describes the misalignment of a circumbinary disk that forms the planets. When the central binary merges into a single star, the disk and any planets that have formed remain in a polar orbit. A study has shown that circumbinary disks are aligned with binaries that have a short orbital period of less than 20 days. Circumbinary disks around binaries with an orbital period of more than 30 days showed a wide range of alignments, including polar disks. The other explanation describes how a Neptune-sized planet might get into a polar orbit at the end of the planet formation. This happens due to a resonance with a protoplanetary disk in a system with an additional outer planet.

In April 2025 astronomers using ESO's UVES instrument on the Very Large Telescope announced strong evidence for a circumbinary planet orbiting the brown dwarf pair 2M1510AB. The planet is called 2M1510(AB)b, or just 2M1510b. The orbit of the planet is unusual as it is a polar orbit around a binary system, the first such case that was discovered. The discovery was made with the help of radial velocity measurements that showed retrograde apsidal precession of the brown dwarf pair, which could not be explained by the outer companion.

== See also ==
- List of orbits
- Molniya orbit
- Tundra orbit
- Vandenberg Air Force Base, a major United States launch location for polar orbits
