= WASP-23 =

K-type star in the Puppis constellation

Observation data Epoch J2000.0 Equinox ICRS
- Constellation: Puppis
- Right ascension: 06^{h} 44^{m} 30.61336^{s}
- Declination: −42° 45′ 42.6668″
- Apparent magnitude (V): 12.52

Characteristics
- Evolutionary stage: main sequence
- Spectral type: K1V

Astrometry
Radial velocity (R_{v})	+5.29±0.52 km/s
Proper motion (μ)	RA: −8.917 mas/yr Dec.: −87.711 mas/yr
Parallax (π)	4.8598±0.0086 mas
Distance	671 ± 1 ly (205.8 ± 0.4 pc)

Details
Mass	0.78+0.13 −0.12 M_{☉}
Radius	0.765+0.033 −0.049 R_{☉}
Surface gravity (log g)	4.4±0.2 cgs
Temperature	5,150±100 K
Metallicity [Fe/H]	−0.05±0.13 dex
Rotational velocity (v sin i)	2.2±0.3 km/s
Age	6.2+5.6 −2.5 Gyr

Other designations
- TOI-477, TIC 170102285, WASP-23, GSC 07635-01376

Database references
SIMBAD	data
Exoplanet Archive	data

WASP-23 is a K1V-type main sequence star located 671 light-years from Earth in the constellation of Puppis. It has a mass of 0.84 solar masses and a radius of 0.88 solar radii. It is around 6.2 billion years old and has an effective temperature of 5046 Kelvin.

== Planetary system ==
There is only one known exoplanet orbiting this star named WASP-23b that was discovered by the transit method in the year 2010 by Triaud et al. It is a hot Jupiter with similar mass and radius to Jupiter.

The WASP-23 planetary system
Companion (in order from star)	Mass	Semimajor axis (AU)	Orbital period (days)	Eccentricity	Inclination (°)	Radius
b	0.879+0.095 −0.10 M_{J}	0.0370+0.0019 −0.0022	2.9444300(11)	<0.065	88.39+0.79 −0.45	0.962+0.047 −0.056 R_{J}
