= WASP-10 =

Star in the constellation Pegasus

Observation data Epoch J2000 Equinox ICRS
- Constellation: Pegasus
- Right ascension: 23^{h} 15^{m} 58.3006^{s}
- Declination: +31° 27′ 46.296″
- Apparent magnitude (V): 12.7

Characteristics
- Evolutionary stage: main sequence
- Spectral type: K5V
- Apparent magnitude (B): ~12.4
- Apparent magnitude (R): ~12.03
- Apparent magnitude (J): 10.603 ±0.026
- Apparent magnitude (H): 10.117 ±0.029
- Apparent magnitude (K): 9.983 ±0.018
- Variable type: planetary transit

Astrometry
Radial velocity (R_{v})	−12.08±0.65 km/s
Proper motion (μ)	RA: 25.050(12) mas/yr Dec.: −25.366(11) mas/yr
Parallax (π)	7.0717±0.0135 mas
Distance	461.2 ± 0.9 ly (141.4 ± 0.3 pc)

Details
Mass	0.752±0.081 M_{☉}
Radius	0.703±0.036 R_{☉}
Temperature	4680±100 K
Metallicity	0.03±0.20
Rotation	11.91±0.05 d
Rotational velocity (v sin i)	3.0±3.0 km/s
Age	7.0+6.0 −3.0 Gyr

Other designations
- TOI-5970, TIC 431701493, WASP-10, GSC 02752-00114, 2MASS J23155829+3127462, UCAC2 42862442, GSC2 N0013312406, 1SWASP J231558.30+312746.4, USNO-B1.0 1214-00586164

Database references
SIMBAD	data
Exoplanet Archive	data

WASP-10 is a star 461 light-years away in the constellation Pegasus. It hosts a transiting planet discovered by the SuperWASP project.

The star is likely older than the Sun, has a fraction of heavy elements close to the solar abundance, and is rotating rapidly, being spun up by the tides raised by the giant planet on a close orbit.

== Planetary system ==
WASP-10 hosts one confirmed exoplanet, WASP-10b. It is a hot Jupiter discovered in 2008.

A candidate second planet with a 5-day period, WASP-10c, was inferred from transit-timing variations of WASP-10b in 2010, but this was refuted in 2013. Instead, there may be a super-Jupiter planet or brown dwarf on a wide (at least 5 AU) orbit, based on radial velocity observations.

The WASP-10 planetary system
Companion (in order from star)	Mass	Semimajor axis (AU)	Orbital period (days)	Eccentricity	Inclination (°)	Radius
b	3.21+0.23 −0.24 M_{J}	0.0378+0.0013 −0.0014	3.09272932(32)	0.0601+0.0064 −0.0046	88.81±0.40	1.067±0.064 R_{J}
c (unconfirmed)	4–90 M_{J}	5–30	—	—	—	—
