= HD 63935 =

High proper-motion star in the constellation Canis Minor

Observation data Epoch J2000.0 Equinox ICRS
- Constellation: Canis Minor
- Right ascension: 07^{h} 51^{m} 41.996^{s}
- Declination: +09° 23′ 9.79″
- Apparent magnitude (V): 8.58

Characteristics
- Evolutionary stage: main sequence
- Spectral type: G5
- Apparent magnitude (G): 8.40

Astrometry
Radial velocity (R_{v})	−20.33±0.12 km/s
Proper motion (μ)	RA: −78.696±0.022 mas/yr Dec.: −188.512±0.013 mas/yr
Parallax (π)	20.47±0.019 mas
Distance	159.3 ± 0.1 ly (48.85 ± 0.05 pc)
Absolute magnitude (M_{V})	+5.15

Details
Mass	0.9406+0.0342 −0.0318 M_{☉}
Radius	0.9598+0.0168 −0.0167 R_{☉}
Luminosity	0.76 L_{☉}
Surface gravity (log g)	4.46 cgs
Temperature	5,513+71 −73 K
Rotational velocity (v sin i)	1.8 km/s
Age	6.6+2.5 −2.4 Myr

Other designations
- BD+09°1791, HD 63935, HIP 38374, SAO 116039, PPM 153456, LSPM J0751+0923, LTT 12075, TOI-509, TIC 453211454, TYC 783-536-1, Gaia DR3 3145754895088191744

Database references
SIMBAD	data

HD 63935 is a G-type main-sequence star located in the constellation of Canis Minor. It is approximately 160 light-years (49 parsecs) from the Solar System and has an apparent visual magnitude of 8.58, making it faintly visible to the naked eye under optimal conditions. The star hosts two confirmed sub-Neptune-sized planets. These planets were discovered by the Transiting Exoplanet Survey Satellite (TESS) and confirmed with precision radial-velocity observations as part of the TESS–Keck Survey. Exoplanet atmospheric studies also took place on this system.

== Discovery and observation ==
The HD 63935 system was given the designation TOI-509 (TESS Object of Interest) during Sector 4 observations in 2018–2019. Transit signals for both planets were detected in the full-frame images and confirmed via ground-based photometry. Radial velocity follow-up by the TESS-Keck Survey, led by researchers including Scarsdale et al. (2021), provided mass constraints, revealing the planets' sub-Neptune nature.

Subsequent analyses, such as those by MacDougall et al. (2023) and Polanski et al. (2024), refined orbital parameters and stellar properties using data from Gaia DR3 and other surveys.

== Planetary system ==
The HD 63935 system features two transiting sub-Neptune exoplanets in short-period orbits, often referred to as "twin" planets due to their comparable sizes, masses, and densities. Both planets were identified as candidates by TESS and confirmed through high-precision radial velocity measurements using the HIRES spectrograph on the Keck Observatory. The inner planet, HD 63935 b (also known as TOI-509.01), orbits every 9.06 days, while the outer planet, HD 63935 c, has an orbital period of 21.40 days. Their near-circular orbits (eccentricity e ≈ 0) and low masses (around 10–11 Earth masses) suggest they are gas-enveloped worlds with rocky cores, typical of sub-Neptunes.

During the identification of the two exoplanets the possibility of a third exoplanet was noted and it was suggested further observations would rule it out.

The HD 63935 planetary system
Companion (in order from star)	Mass	Semimajor axis (AU)	Orbital period (days)	Eccentricity	Inclination (°)	Radius
b	10.8±1.8 M_{🜨}	0.083±0.002	9.058807±0.000015	—	88.4900±0.0018	2.99±0.14 R_{🜨}
c	11.1±2.4 M_{🜨}	0.148±0.003	21.4027±0.0018	—	88.2410+0.0011 −0.0013	2.90±0.13 R_{🜨}

== See also ==
- The TESS-Keck Survey
- Transiting Exoplanet Survey Satellite
- List of exoplanets discovered in 2021
