= 2M0437 b =

Gas giant

2M0437b
Discovery
- Discovered by: Gaidos et al.
- Discovery site: Subaru Telescope, Hawaii, USA
- Discovery date: October 2021
- Detection method: Imaged

Designations
- Alternative names: 2MASS J04372171+2651014 b

Orbital characteristics
- Semi-major axis: 118 ± 1.3 AU (1.765×10^{10} ± 190,000,000 km)

Physical characteristics
- Mass: 3-5 M_{J}
- Surface gravity: 3.6
- Temperature: ~1200 K

2M0437 b, or 2MASS J04372171+2651014 b, is an extrasolar planet that orbits the pre-main sequence red dwarf 2MASS J04372171+2651014, 418 light-years away in the constellation of Taurus. It is a gas giant, with a mass 4 times that of Jupiter. It is one of the few exoplanets directly imaged. The planet is of importance to astronomers as it challenges models of planet formation by nucleus accretion and disk instability.

== Star ==
The host star is a low mass red dwarf star (a mass of 0.15-0.18 solar masses) that belongs to the pre-main sequence with a temperature of 3100 K. Although K2 detected a quasiperiodic dimming of nearby circumstellar dust, the star it lacks an excess infrared emission detectable from a circumstellar disk and its Hα emission is not proportional to accretion. There is also evidence of a second extremely faint object 75 arc-seconds apart that is possibly linked to the star.

== Discovery ==
2M0437 b was first observed in March 2018 in images from the Subaru Telescope. The observations required three years to confirm that the observed object was not a background star since the star has a very slow apparent movement across the sky.

== Characteristics ==
It is a super-Jupiter-type planet with a mass of 4 or 5 times that of Jupiter, at a distance of 118 AU from its star and an age between 2 and 5 million years. It is one of the youngest planets discovered. Together with their star they belong to a 1 to 5 million year old Taurus star formation region. Its effective temperature of ~ 1450 K gives it a spectrum of the L8-9 spectral type. Follow-up near-infrared (1-2.4 μm) spectroscopy with Subaru and Keck-1 detected carbon monoxide and possibly water vapor and methane in the atmosphere of 2M0437b. The absence or attenuation of spectral features at shorter wavelengths suggests the presence of micron-size dust.

== See also ==
- List of exoplanets discovered in 2021
