= HD 3765 =

K-type main-sequence star in the constellation Andromeda

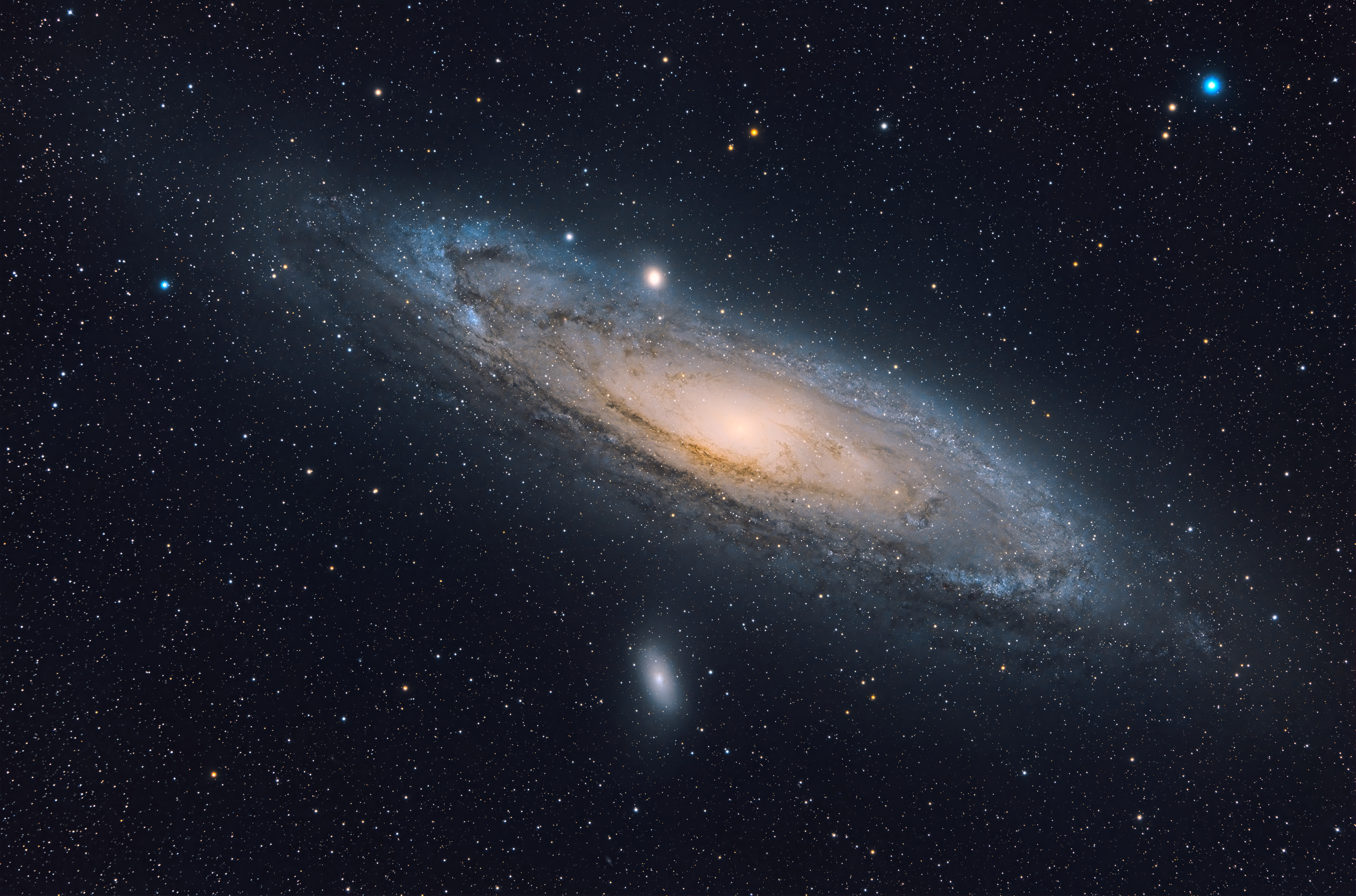
- View of the Andromeda Galaxy, with HD 3765 circled in red. The star is much closer than Andromeda, within the Milky Way galaxy.

Observation data Epoch J2000 Equinox ICRS
- Constellation: Andromeda
- Right ascension: 00^{h} 40^{m} 49.270^{s}
- Declination: +40° 11′ 13.82″
- Apparent magnitude (V): 7.34

Characteristics
- Evolutionary stage: Main sequence
- Spectral type: K2V

Astrometry
Radial velocity (R_{v})	−63.33±0.12 km/s
Proper motion (μ)	RA: 356.318 mas/yr Dec.: −669.205 mas/yr
Parallax (π)	55.8412±0.0235 mas
Distance	58.41 ± 0.02 ly (17.908 ± 0.008 pc)
Absolute magnitude (M_{V})	6.16

Details
Mass	0.852+0.020 −0.044 M_{☉}
Radius	0.79±0.02 R_{☉}
Luminosity	0.383±0.011 L_{☉}
Surface gravity (log g)	4.58±0.03 cgs
Temperature	5076+115 −160 K
Metallicity [Fe/H]	0.25 dex
Rotation	44.7+1.7 −1.0 d
Rotational velocity (v sin i)	2 km/s

Other designations
- BD+39 154, GJ 28, HD 3765, HIP 3206, SAO 54074, LHS 1125, Wolf 12

Database references
SIMBAD	data
Exoplanet Archive	data

HD 3765 is a single K-type main-sequence star in the constellation of Andromeda, near the Andromeda Galaxy in the sky. Its surface temperature is about 5076 K. HD 3765 has an orange hue and is too faint to be seen with the naked eye, but can be seen with a small telescope. It has an apparent visual magnitude of 7.34. Based upon parallax measurements, it is located 58.4 light-years from the Sun. The object is drifting towards the Sun with a radial velocity of −63.3 km/s.

== Planetary system ==
HD 3765 has one known exoplanet, discovered in 2021 by the radial velocity method. Prior to this discovery, it had been used as a radial velocity standard star. The planet, HD 3765 b, orbits with a period of 3.3 years at a distance of 2.1 AU, and is not in the habitable zone. It is a gas giant with a minimum mass of 0.173 Jupiter masses, and a predicted radius 0.764 times that of Jupiter.

A candidate second planet was identified in a 2026 study using HARPS-N. This would be a Neptune-mass planet orbiting closer to the star, with a period of 133 days.

During observations of the variable star EG Andromedae in 1971, a possible eclipse of HD 3765 (which was used as a comparison star) was observed. It was proposed that this might be due to a transiting planet the size of Jupiter. The presence of eclipses has not been confirmed, and the observation could have been due to intrinsic variability, or in error.

The HD 3765 planetary system
Companion (in order from star)	Mass	Semimajor axis (AU)	Orbital period (days)	Eccentricity	Inclination (°)	Radius
.01 (unconfirmed)	≥15.1±2.2 M_{🜨}	—	132.70±0.19	0.124+0.150 −0.087	—	—
b	≥0.173+0.014 −0.013 M_{J}	2.108+0.032 −0.033	1211+15 −16	0.298+0.078 −0.071	—	—

== See also ==
- List of exoplanets discovered in 2021
