= TOI-1685 b =

Super-Earth-type exoplanet

Discovery
- Discovery date: 2021

Orbital characteristics
- Semi-major axis: 0.01164 AU
- Eccentricity: ?
- Orbital period (sidereal): 0.69 d
- Inclination: ?
- Star: TOI-1685

Physical characteristics
- Mean radius: 1.468 ±0.050 R_{🜨}
- Mass: 3.03 ±033 M_{🜨}
- Mean density: 5.51 g/cm -3
- Temperature: 1062 ±27 K

Atmosphere
- Composition by volume: Secondary: likely CO2, SO2, H2O, CH4, CO

TOI-1685 b is a terrestrial super-Earth that orbits around the red dwarf star TOI-1685 which is located around 122.6 light years (37.6 parsecs) from Earth. It is a hot and barren planet with a mass of about 3 Earths and a radius of 1.4 Earths. The planet orbits at a distance of 0.01164 AU with unknown orbital eccentricity and inclination. The extreme closeness to its host star results in an orbital period lasting only 0.69 days. This makes TOI-1685 b an ultra-short period (USP) planet.

== Discovery ==
The planet was discovered in 2021 using the transit method and reported by two discovery papers: Bluhm et al. 2021 and Hirano et al. 2021. While both papers included photometric data from the Transiting Exoplanet Survey Satellite (TESS), they included a variety of additional data and methods of analysis. This led to significant disagreements between the characteristics of the host star and planet, including their mass and radius. Bluhm et al. 2021 reported this planet to have a mass of about 3.78 Earths and a radius of 1.70 Earths while Hirano et al. 2021 reported this planet having a mass of about 3.43 Earths and a radius of 2.0 Earths. The paper Burt et al. 2024 updates the characteristics of both the host star and the planet using updated transiting data and RV analysis.

== Physical characteristics ==
The planet was initially interpreted to have a mass between 3.43 and 3.78 Earths and a radius between 1.70 and 2.0 Earths. However it appears that TOI-1685 b is smaller, with lower mass and higher densities than initially reported. The planet has a mass of 3.03 ±0.33 Earths and a radius of 1.468 ±0.050 Earths. It has a density of 5.3 ±0.8 g/cm^{−3} which is similar to the rough density of Earth which is 5.51 g/cm^{−3}. The Earth-like density of this planet suggests that TOI-1685 b is likely a terrestrial planet. The equilibrium temperature is high at 1062 ±27 Kelvin.

TOI-1685 b was initially thought to be either a hot and barren terrestrial planet or a water world composed of 50% water and 50% enstatite (MgSiO_{3}). However its density and observations from the James Webb Space Telescope (JWST) during its second cycle reveals that TOI-1685 b is likely not a water world but more likely a hot barren world with negligible amounts of volatile materials.

=== Atmosphere ===
Hydrogen-dominated atmospheres have been confidently ruled out and any hydrogen or helium gasses that would have formed with the planet appear to no longer be part of its atmosphere. TOI-1685 b could have a secondary atmosphere that is made of purely heavier gasses such as carbon dioxide (CO_{2}), sulfur dioxide (SO_{2}), water (H_{2}O) or methane (CH_{4}). Another scenario that could fit the data would be a mixed secondary atmosphere made up of carbon monoxide (CO), CO_{2} and SO_{2}. A pure methane-dominated atmosphere appears to be unlikely and atmospheres composed purely of CO_{2} and water would require high-altitude clouds or a thin cloud-free atmosphere.

== Formation ==
The formation of ultra-short period planets in their current position has been deemed unlikely, as the dust particles inside the protoplanetary disk do not sublimate at distances this close to the star. This suggests that TOI-1685 did not form in situ and instead migrated to its current position, however the process on how it got to its current position is not definitively known. One possible scenario involves dynamical interactions with other planets in the system driving the orbit of TOI-1685 b from longer periods to shorter. However, there is a lack of evidence for additional planets in the system. Another scenario is that ultra-short period planets like TOI-1685 b are the remnant cores of hot Jupiters or hot Saturns. However evidence for this seems to be lacking as there are no abnormalities in the stars metallicity.

== See also ==
1. List of exoplanets discovered in 2021
2. Janssen- an super-Earth with a thick atmosphere
3. Kepler-78b- an Earth-sized lava world
4. GJ 4256 b- an egg-shaped Earth-sized world that nearly reached its host stars roche limit
