= WASP-16 =

Star in constellation of Virgo

Observation data Epoch J2000.0 Equinox ICRS
- Constellation: Virgo
- Right ascension: 14^{h} 18^{m} 43.9225^{s}
- Declination: −20° 16′ 31.844″
- Apparent magnitude (V): 11.309

Characteristics
- Spectral type: G3V
- Apparent magnitude (B): 12.51±0.32
- Apparent magnitude (R): ~11.00
- Apparent magnitude (I): 10.49±0.02
- Apparent magnitude (J): 9.984±0.024
- Apparent magnitude (H): 9.659±0.022
- Apparent magnitude (K): 9.589±0.023

Astrometry
Radial velocity (R_{v})	−1.34±0.61 km/s
Proper motion (μ)	RA: 0.088(27) mas/yr Dec.: 17.350(21) mas/yr
Parallax (π)	5.1912±0.0262 mas
Distance	628 ± 3 ly (192.6 ± 1.0 pc)

Details
Mass	1.022±0.101 M_{☉}
Radius	0.946±0.054 R_{☉}
Surface gravity (log g)	4.5±0.2 cgs
Temperature	5700±150 K
Metallicity [Fe/H]	0.01±0.10 dex
Rotational velocity (v sin i)	3.0±1.0 km/s
Age	5^{+3.1}_{−0} Gyr

Other designations
- TOI-818, TIC 46096489, WASP-16, TYC 6147-229-1, GSC 06147-00229, 2MASS J14184392-2016317, SDSS J141843.92-201631.8

Database references
SIMBAD	data
Exoplanet Archive	data

WASP-16 is a magnitude 11 yellow dwarf main sequence star, with characteristics similar to the Sun, located 628 light-years away in the constellation Virgo.

== Planetary system ==
In 2009, a planet of the star was announced by the SuperWASP project. It is another hot Jupiter type exoplanet.

In 2024, a candidate mini-neptune was detected, also using the transit method. Further observations are needed to confirm its existence. The planet takes ten days to fully orbit WASP-16 and has an equilibrium temperature of 810 K (537 °C).

The WASP-16 planetary system
Companion (in order from star)	Mass	Semimajor axis (AU)	Orbital period (days)	Eccentricity	Inclination (°)	Radius
b	0.908+0.045 −0.071 M_{J}	0.0422+0.0010 −0.0017	3.1186068(12)	<0.018	85.22+0.27 −0.43	1.008+0.083 −0.060 R_{J}
c (unconfirmed)	—	—	10.457+0.018 −0.028	—	—	2.2±0.23 R_{🜨}
