= TOI-1260 =

K-type main-sequence star in the constellation Ursa Major

Observation data Epoch RA2000 Equinox ICRS
- Constellation: Ursa Major
- Right ascension: 10^{h} 28^{m} 35.025^{s}
- Declination: +65° 51′ 16.38″
- Apparent magnitude (V): 11.875

Characteristics
- Evolutionary stage: Main sequence
- Spectral type: K6 V

Astrometry
Radial velocity (R_{v})	−16.70±0.40 km/s
Proper motion (μ)	RA: −177.340 mas/yr Dec.: −81.693 mas/yr
Parallax (π)	13.6226±0.0147 mas
Distance	239.4 ± 0.3 ly (73.41 ± 0.08 pc)

Details
Mass	0.679+0.095 −0.057 M_{☉}
Radius	0.672±0.010 R_{☉}
Luminosity	0.129±0.004 L_{☉}
Surface gravity (log g)	4.57±0.05 cgs
Temperature	4227±85 K
Metallicity [Fe/H]	−0.10±0.07 dex
Rotation	30.63±3.81 d
Rotational velocity (v sin i)	1.5±0.7 km/s
Age	6.7+5.1 −5.2 Gyr

Other designations
- LP 62-217, NLTT 24401, TOI-1260, TIC 355867695, 2MASS J10283500+6551163

Database references
SIMBAD	data
Exoplanet Archive	data

TOI-1260 is a single high-proper-motion K-type main-sequence star in the constellation of Ursa Major. Its surface temperature is 4227±85 K. TOI-1260 has an orange hue and is too faint to be seen with the naked eye, or a small telescope. It has an apparent visual magnitude of 11.922±0.034. Based upon parallax measurements, it is located 239 light-years from the Sun. The object is drifting towards the Sun with a radial velocity of -16.7 km/s.

== Planetary system ==
TOI-1260 has three known planets, two discovered in 2021 and one in 2022 by the transit method.

None of these three planets orbit in the habitable zone. All are sub-Neptunes, with masses and radii indicating that they are partly composed of gas.

The TOI-1260 planetary system
Companion (in order from star)	Mass	Semimajor axis (AU)	Orbital period (days)	Eccentricity	Inclination (°)	Radius
b	8.56±1.54 M_{🜨}	0.0367±0.0011	3.127463±0.000005	0	89.03±0.61	2.41±0.05 R_{🜨}
c	13.20±4.23 M_{🜨}	0.0657±0.0020	7.493134±0.000020	0	87.97±0.11	2.76±0.07 R_{🜨}
d	11.84±7.79 M_{🜨}	0.1116±0.0033	16.608164±0.000083	0	89.14±0.10	3.12±0.08 R_{🜨}

== See also ==
- List of exoplanets discovered in 2022
