= WASP-16b =

Extrasolar planet

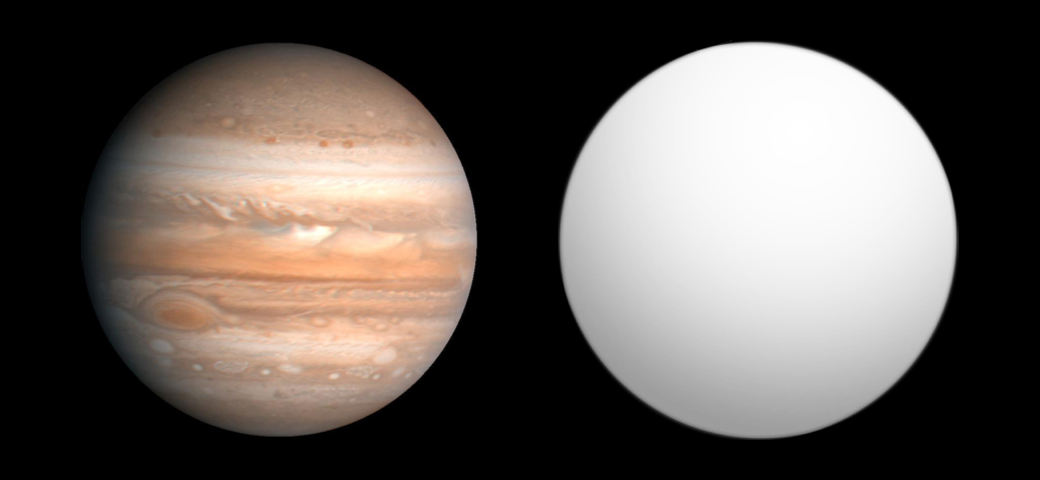
- Size comparison of WASP-16b with Jupiter.

Discovery
- Discovered by: Lister et al.
- Discovery date: August 3, 2009
- Detection method: Transit and Radial velocity

Orbital characteristics
- Semi-major axis: 0.0421^{+0.001}_{−0.0018} AU
- Eccentricity: 0
- Orbital period (sidereal): 3.1186009^{+1.46e-5}_{−1.31e-5} d
- Inclination: 85.22^{+0.27}_{−0.43}
- Star: WASP-16

Physical characteristics
- Mass: 0.855 ± 0.059 M_{J}

WASP-16b is an extrasolar planet that travels around its star, WASP-16, every 3.12 days. Likely a hot Jupiter. Its mass is near .855 of Jupiter, the radius is 1.008 of Jupiter. It was discovered in 2009 by a team led by T.A. Lister as part of the Wide Angle Search for Planets project.

== Characteriscics ==
In 2012, it was found from the Rossiter–McLaughlin effect that WASP-16b orbits its slow-rotating and likely old parent star WASP-16 in a prograde direction, with the star's rotational axis inclined to the planetary orbit by −4.2°+11.0°
−13.9°.
