= WASP-10b =

Large short-orbit exoplanet

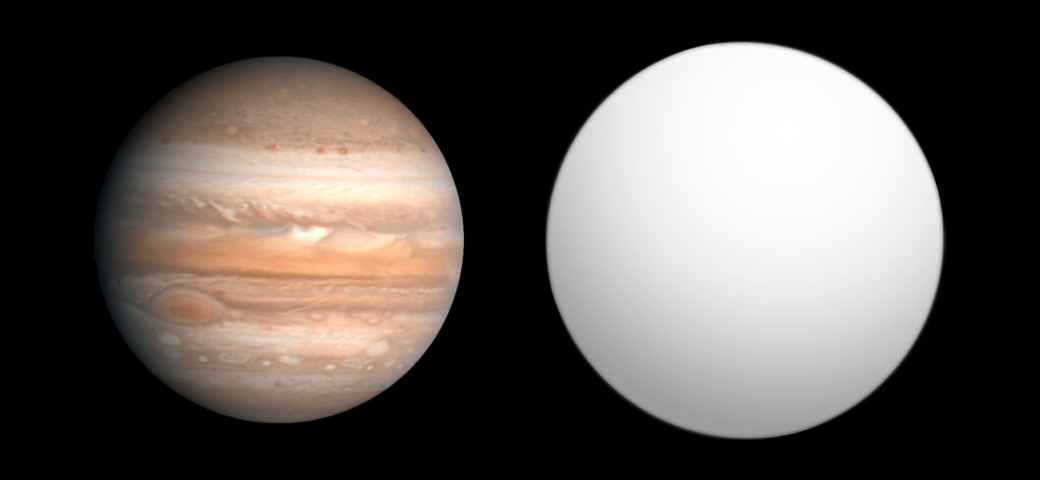
- Size comparison of WASP-10b with Jupiter

Discovery
- Discovered by: Cameron et al. (SuperWASP)
- Discovery site: SAAO
- Discovery date: April 1, 2008
- Detection method: Transit

Orbital characteristics
- Semi-major axis: 0.0371^{+0.0014}_{−0.0013} AU
- Eccentricity: 0.057^{+0.011}_{−0.005}
- Orbital period (sidereal): 3.0927616^{+1.12E-5}_{−1.82E-5} d
- Inclination: 86.8^{+0.6}_{−0.5}
- Argument of periastron: 2.737^{+0.194}_{−0.166}
- Star: WASP-10

Physical characteristics
- Mean radius: 1.08 ± 0.02 R_{J}
- Mass: 3.06^{+0.23}_{−0.21} M_{J}
- Mean density: 3.22 g/cm^{3}
- Surface gravity: 6.93 g
- Temperature: 1,300 K

WASP-10b is an extrasolar planet discovered in 2008 by SuperWASP using the transit method. It takes about three days to orbit around WASP-10. Follow-up radial velocity observations showed that it is three times more massive than Jupiter, while the transit observations showed that its radius is only 8% larger than Jupiter's, giving the planet a density more similar to the Moon than a normal gas giant. It is currently the only confirmed planet around WASP-10, as WASP-10c is still unconfirmed.

== See also ==
- Wide Angle Search for Planets
