= HD 110113 =

Star

Observation data Epoch J2000.0 Equinox ICRS
- Constellation: Centaurus
- Right ascension: 12^{h} 40^{m} 08.781^{s}
- Declination: −44° 18′ 43.27″
- Apparent magnitude (V): 10.063

Characteristics
- Evolutionary stage: main sequence
- Spectral type: G8V
- B−V color index: 0.697±0.041

Astrometry
Radial velocity (R_{v})	17.46 km/s
Proper motion (μ)	RA: −3.723 mas/yr Dec.: −13.766 mas/yr
Parallax (π)	9.4499±0.0158 mas
Distance	345.1 ± 0.6 ly (105.8 ± 0.2 pc)

Details
Mass	0.997±0.08 M_{☉}
Radius	0.968 R_{☉}
Luminosity	0.91 L_{☉}
Surface gravity (log g)	4.46±0.05 cgs
Temperature	5,732±16 K
Metallicity [Fe/H]	−0.004 dex
Rotation	20.8±1.2 d
Rotational velocity (v sin i)	1.74 km/s
Age	4.0 Gyr

Other designations
- CD−43°7805, HD 110113, HIP 61820, PPM 317672, TOI-755

Database references
SIMBAD	data

HD 110113, also known as TOI-755, is a star with a pair of orbiting exoplanets in the constellation Centaurus. With an apparent visual magnitude of 10.063, it is much too faint to be viewed with the naked eye. The system is located at a distance from the Solar System of about 346.5 light-years (106.2 parsecs). It is drifting further away with a heliocentric radial velocity of 17 km/s. A planetary system was discovered orbiting this star in 2021.

The spectrum of HD 110113 presents as a G-type main-sequence star, or yellow dwarf, with a stellar classification of G8V. It has an estimated age of four billion years and is spinning slowly with a rotation period of 20.8 days. The star is considered a solar analog, having nearly the same mass and size as the Sun. It radiating 91% of the Sun's luminosity from its photosphere at an effective temperature of 5,732 K. The star displays rotationally-modulated variability that is indicative of star spots.

== Planetary system ==
The two candidate planets orbiting TOI-755 – TOI-755b and TOI-755c – were announced in 2021. TOI-755b's temperature is over 1,570 K (1,300 °C) and TOI-755c's temperature is cooler at around 1,260 K (990 °C), which means they are Hot Neptunes.

The HD 110113 planetary system
Companion (in order from star)	Mass	Semimajor axis (AU)	Orbital period (days)	Eccentricity	Inclination (°)	Radius
b	4.54 ± 0.64 M_{🜨}	0.035	2.541^{+0.0005}_{−0.001}	—	—	2.05 ± 0.12 R_{🜨}
c	10.49 ± 1.2 M_{🜨}	0.068^{+0.001}_{−0.002}	6.744^{+0.008}_{−0.009}	—	—	—
