= WASP-23b =

Hot jupiter

Discovery
- Discovered by: Triaud et al. 2011
- Discovery date: 2010
- Detection method: Transit

Orbital characteristics
- Semi-major axis: 0.0376
- Eccentricity: 0.062
- Orbital period (sidereal): 2.9444256 d
- Inclination: 88.39°
- Star: WASP-23

Physical characteristics
- Mean diameter: 0.962 R_{J}
- Mass: 0.88 M_{J}
- Mean density: 1.17 g/cm3

WASP-23b is a hot Jupiter class exoplanet that orbits around the star WASP-23, a K-type main sequence star that is located 676 light years from Earth in the constellation of Puppis. It is similar to Jupiter in its physical parameters with a mass of 0.88 Jupiter masses and a radius of 0.96 Jupiter radii. It orbits at a distance of 0.0376 AU taking 2.94 days to complete an orbit. The orbit has an eccentricity of 0.062 and an inclination of 88.36°.

== Discovery ==
WASP-23b was discovered by the WASP-south transit survey (WASP) via the transit method in the year 2010 by Triaud et al. 2011. The detection was confirmed photometrically and spectroscopically by the Swiss Euler telescope. Spectra were obtained during the transit of WASP-23b with the HARPS spectrograph and the Rossiter-McLaughlin effect was detected despite its small amplitude.
