= YSES 2b =

Star in the constelation Musca

Observation data Epoch J2000 Equinox ICRS
- Constellation: Musca
- Right ascension: 11^{h} 27^{m} 55.3^{s}
- Declination: −66° 26′ 04″

Characteristics
- Evolutionary stage: main sequence
- Spectral type: late M

Astrometry
Proper motion (μ)	RA: −25.42+0.25 −0.18 mas/yr Dec.: 3.30+0.28 −0.30 mas/yr
Parallax (π)	0.41+0.37 −0.28 mas
Distance	2,500 pc

Details
Radius	0.5 R_{☉}
Surface gravity (log g)	4.4 cgs
Temperature	3065 K

Other designations
- TYC 8984-2245-1 b, 2MASS J11275535-6626046 b

Database references
SIMBAD	data
Exoplanet Archive	data

YSES 2b is a red dwarf star located in the constellation of Musca. It was discovered through direct imaging by Bohn et al. in 2021. It was initially suspected to be a long-period planet, but in 2025 it was found to be a background star unrelated to YSES 2, a young, Sun-like star which is approximately 360 ly from Earth in Scorpius-Centaurus Association whose age is 14 million years.
