= HD 168009 =

High proper motion star

Observation data Epoch J2000 Equinox ICRS
- Constellation: Lyra
- Right ascension: 18^{h} 15^{m} 32.463^{s}
- Declination: +45° 12′ 33.54″
- Apparent magnitude (V): 6.307

Characteristics
- Spectral type: G1 V
- U−B color index: 0.115
- B−V color index: 0.635

Astrometry
Radial velocity (R_{v})	−64.9±0.1 km/s
Proper motion (μ)	RA: −77.290±0.018 mas/yr Dec.: −114.748±0.019 mas/yr
Parallax (π)	42.9348±0.0158 mas
Distance	75.97 ± 0.03 ly (23.291 ± 0.009 pc)
Absolute magnitude (M_{V})	4.52
Absolute bolometric magnitude (M_{bol})	4.39±0.06

Details
Mass	0.99 M_{☉}
Radius	1.14±0.04 R_{☉}
Luminosity	1.43 L_{☉}
Surface gravity (log g)	4.31 cgs
Temperature	5,792±80 K
Metallicity [Fe/H]	−0.02 dex
Rotation	30.1+1.1 −0.9 d
Rotational velocity (v sin i)	3 km/s
Age	8.1 Gyr

Other designations
- BD+45°2684, GJ 708.4, GJ 9622, HD 168009, HIP 89474, HR 6847, SAO 47343, 2MASS J18153245+4512333

Database references
SIMBAD	data

HD 168009 is a star in the northern constellation of Lyra. It has an apparent visual magnitude of 6.3, placing it just above to below the normal limit of stars visible to the naked eye under good viewing conditions of 6-6.5. An annual parallax shift of 42.93 mas provides a distance estimate of 76 light years. It is moving closer to the Sun with a heliocentric radial velocity of −65 km/s. In about 328,000 years from now, the star will make its closest approach at a distance of around 17 ly (5.1 pc).

This is a solar analog, which means its measured properties are similar to those of the Sun. However, it is much older than the Sun with an estimated age of around 8.1 billion years. The spectrum matches a stellar classification of G1 V, indicating this is an ordinary G-type main-sequence star that is generating energy through hydrogen fusion at its core. The level of chromospheric activity is low, making it a candidate for a Maunder minimum event.

HD 168009 has about the same mass as the Sun, but is 14% larger in radius. It has a similar metallicity to the Sun – what astronomers term the abundance of elements other than hydrogen and helium – and is spinning with a rotation period of 30 days. The star is radiating 1.43 times the Sun's luminosity from its photosphere at an effective temperature of 5,792 K. It has been examined for an infrared excess that may indicate the presence of a circumstellar disk of dust, but no statistically significant excess was detected.

== Planetary system ==
In 2020, a candidate exoplanet was detected orbiting this star. With a minimum mass of 0.03 M_{J} (9.5 M_{🜨}) and an orbital period of 15 days, this would most likely be a hot mini-Neptune. The planet existence was confirmed in 2021.

Evidence for a second planet, HD 168009 c, in radial velocity data, was presented in 2026. However, it is still not possible to conclude if the radial velocity signal is truly caused by an orbiting planet, or simply an artifact of stellar activity. If confirmed, the planet would orbit at a period of 27.8 days and have a minimum mass of 7 M_{🜨}.

The HD 168009 planetary system
Companion (in order from star)	Mass	Semimajor axis (AU)	Orbital period (days)	Eccentricity	Inclination (°)	Radius
b	≥8.61+0.85 −0.86 M_{🜨}	0.1218+0.0011 −0.0012	15.1437+0.0027 −0.0026	0.08+0.08 −0.05	—	—
c (unconfirmed)	≥6.83+1.46 −1.50 M_{🜨}	0.1823±0.0017	27.7579+0.0130 −0.0249	0.11+0.12 −0.08	—	—
