= TOI-1227 b =

Young exoplanet orbiting the red dwarf TOI-1227

Discovery
- Discovered by: Mann et al. (THYME)
- Discovery date: 2022
- Detection method: Transit method

Orbital characteristics
- Semi-major axis: 0.0886+0.0054 −0.0057 AU
- Orbital period (sidereal): 27.4 days
- Inclination: 88.571+0.062 −0.093 °
- Star: TOI-1227 (Gaia DR2 5842480953772012928)

Physical characteristics
- Mean radius: 0.854+0.067 −0.052 R_{J}

TOI-1227 b is one of the youngest transiting exoplanets discovered (as of September 2022), alongside K2-33b and HIP 67522 b. The exoplanet TOI-1227 b is 5–12 million years old (Note: For comparison, the Solar System is about 4.6 billion years old.) and currently 9.6 R_{🜨} large. It will become a 3-5 R_{🜨} planet in about 1 billion years, because the planet is still contracting. TOI-1227 b orbits its host star every 27.36 days.

== Characteristics ==
TOI-1227 b has a size that is 85% that of Jupiter, or 9.6 times that of Earth. No other Jupiter-sized planet was detected around mid- to late M-dwarfs, despite the deep transits such a planet would create. The researchers find that the planet is still hot from its formation and this heat, combined with a hydrogen-dominated primary atmosphere makes the atmosphere of TOI-1227 b inflated. Evolutionary models suggest that TOI-1227 b will eventually evolve into a sub-Neptune within the next billion years.

=== Future research ===
Radial velocity follow-up to determine the mass of TOI-1227 b is not possible in the optical, but might be possible in the near-infrared. A less challenging follow-up would be the measurement of the Spin-Orbit-Alignment via the Rossiter–McLaughlin effect.

== Host star ==
TOI-1227
Observation data Epoch J2000 Equinox J2000
- Constellation: Musca (Note: Obtained with a right ascension of 12^{h} 27^{m} 4.31^{s} and a declination of −72° 27′ 6.5″ on this website.)
- Right ascension: 12^{h} 27^{m} 4.31^{s}
- Declination: −72° 27′ 6.5″
- Apparent magnitude (V): 17±1.133

Characteristics
- Evolutionary stage: Pre-main sequence star
- Spectral type: M4.5V-M5V

Astrometry
Radial velocity (R_{v})	13.3±0.3 km/s
Proper motion (μ)	RA: −40.2658±0.0972 mas/yr Dec.: −10.6417±0.0807 mas/yr
Parallax (π)	9.9079±0.0558 mas
Distance	328.089+1.87 −1.845 ly (100.641+0.573 −0.566 pc)
Absolute magnitude (M_{V})	11.986 (Note: Calculated using an apparent magnitude of 17 and a distance of 100.641 parsecs in the equation M_{app} = M_{abs} - 5 + 5 * log(distance (parsecs)))

Details
Mass	0.17±0.015 M_{☉}
Radius	0.56±0.03 R_{☉}
Luminosity	0.0251 L_{☉}
Surface gravity (log g)	4.7893±0.0058 cgs
Temperature	3072±74 K
Rotation	1.65±0.04 d
Rotational velocity (v sin i)	16.65±0.24 km/s
Age	11±2 Myr

Other designations
- 2MASS J12270432-7227064, Gaia DR2 5842480953772012928, Gaia DR3 5842480953772012928, TIC 360156606, TOI-1227, UCAC4 088-032065, WISE J122704.24-722706.5, WISEA J122704.22-722706.5

Database references
SIMBAD	data

TOI-1227 was first identified as a pre-main-sequence star (PMS star) with the Gaia satellite. Without this prior identification as a PMS star the exoplanet signal of TOI-1227 b would have been disregarded as an eclipsing binary due to the V-shape of the transit signal.

The star is located north of the globular cluster NGC 4372, but it is much closer to earth than this cluster of stars, at a distance of about 101 parsecs (330 light-years). NGC 4372 is 5,800 parsecs (19,000 ly) away.

The host star TOI-1227 is part of a subgroup of the Lower Centaurus Crux OB association, sometimes called B, A0 and called Musca group by the scientists that discovered TOI-1227 b. This group was called Musca after the constellation Musca in which most of its members are located.

TOI-1227 has a spectral type of M4.5V to M5V, a mass 17% of the Sun and a radius 56% of the Sun. The host star is relative faint for a TOI with a visual magnitude of about 17. The right ascension of 12^{h} 27^{m} 4.31^{s} and the declination −72° 27′ 6.5″ implies that it is located in the Musca constellation. (Note: The constellation can be obtained by the right ascension and declination in this website.) The host star shows Lithium in its atmosphere, which should be depleted within 10-200 million years for M-dwarfs.
