= Kepler-1704b =

Eccentric super-Jupiter orbiting Kepler-1704

Discovery
- Discovered by: Paul A. Dalba et al.
- Discovery date: 2021

Designations
- Alternative names: KOI-375.01

Orbital characteristics
- Periastron: 0.16
- Apoastron: 3.9
- Semi-major axis: 2.026+0.024 −0.031 AU
- Eccentricity: 0.921+0.010 −0.015
- Orbital period (sidereal): 988.8811177±0.0009114
- Inclination: 89.01+0.59 −0.27°

Physical characteristics
- Mean radius: 10.81 R_{🜨}
- Mass: 4.15 ± 0.29 M_{J}
- Temperature: 253.8+3.7 −4.1 K

Kepler-1704b is a super-Jupiter on a highly eccentric orbit around the star Kepler-1704. It has a mass of 4.51 M_{J}. The planet's distance from its star varies from 0.16 to 3.9 AU. It is a failed hot Jupiter, having been scattered from its birth orbit to orbit with a periastron just above the tidal circularization distance.

== Characteristics ==
Kepler-1704b is much more massive than Jupiter, at 4.51 M_{J}. The high planetary mass makes Kepler-1704b a super-Jupiter. Kepler-1704b goes on a highly eccentric 2.7 year-long (988.88 days) orbit around its star as well as transiting. The extreme eccentricity yields a temperature difference of up to 700 K.

== Star ==
The star, Kepler-1704, is a G2, 5745-kelvin star 825 parsecs (2,690 ly) from Earth and the sun. It has a mass of 1.131 M_{☉}, a radius of 1.697 R_{☉}, and a luminosity of 2.83 L_{☉}. The high radius for the star's mass hints that Kepler-1704 is not a main-sequence star.

== See also ==
- List of planet types
- Gas giant
- Kepler-419b
- HD 80606 b
- HR 5183 b
- HD 20782 b
