= TOI-4138 b =

Jupiter-sized exoplanet

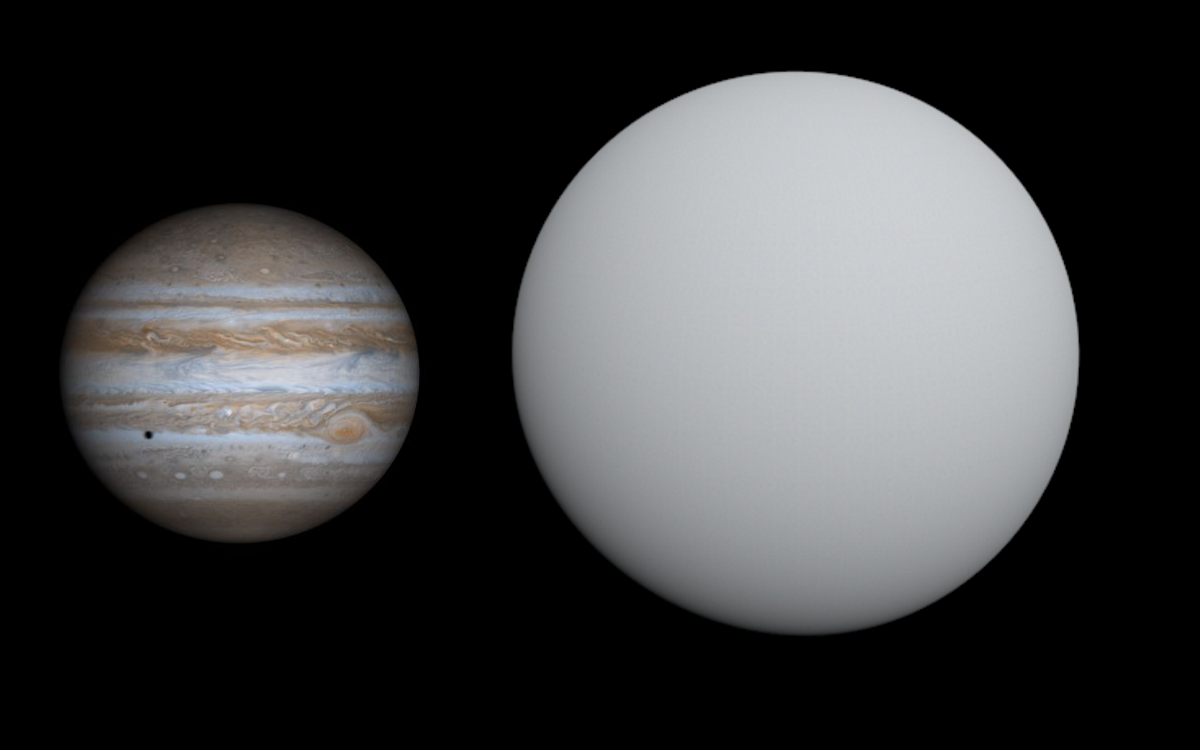
- TOI-4138 b compared to Jupiter

Discovery
- Discovered by: Montalto et al.
- Discovery site: TESS
- Discovery date: 13 October 2021
- Detection method: Transit

Orbital characteristics
- Periastron: 0.049 AU (7,300,000 km)
- Apoastron: 0.052 AU (7,800,000 km)
- Semi-major axis: 0.051 ± 0.002 AU (7,630,000 ± 300,000 km)
- Eccentricity: 0.03 ± 0.02
- Orbital period (sidereal): 3.660028 ± 0.000006 d
- Inclination: 86.0°±0.7°
- Time of periastron: 2,458,708.9983 ± 0.0003 JD
- Semi-amplitude: 74±3 m/s
- Star: TOI-4138

Physical characteristics
- Mean radius: 1.49 ± 0.04 R_{J}
- Mass: 0.67 ± 0.03 M_{J}
- Mean density: 0.250 ± 0.020 g/cm^{3}
- Temperature: 1,762 ± 21 K (2,711.9 ± 37.8 °F; 1,488.8 ± 21.0 °C)

TOI-4138 b is a transiting exoplanet orbiting the G-type subgiant TOI-4138 1,674 light years away in the northern circumpolar constellation Ursa Minor.

== Discovery ==
The planet was discovered by TESS using the transit method, which involves measuring light curves during a planet’s eclipse. The paper states that it’s inflated due to heating from its host star, which has a high luminosity. Its discovery was announced in October 2021.

== Properties ==
=== Orbit and mass ===
TOI-4138 b has an orbital period of 3.6 days, typical for a hot Jupiter. This corresponds to a separation from its host close to one eighth of the distance of Mercury from the Sun. Since the inclination is known, doppler spectroscopy measurements give the planet a mass only 67% that of Jupiter. Its separation is comparable with HD 209458 b, but is much larger due to the evolved state of the host star.

=== Radius and density ===
TOI-4138 b’s transit gives it a radius 1.49 times that of Jupiter; this combined with its low mass of 0.67 M_{J} gives it a density only 25% that of water.

=== Host star ===
TOI-4138 b orbits TOI-4138, a subgiant star located in the constellation Ursa Minor. The star has an enlarged radius of 1.82 R_{☉}, a luminosity of 4.37 L_{☉} and an effective temperature of 6,128 K (5,855 °C). It has 1.32 times the Sun's mass, and it has an intermediate age of around 3.5 billion years. The apparent magnitude of the star is 11.8, making it not visible to the naked eye.
