= TOI-178 =

Star in the constellation Sculptor

Observation data Epoch J2000 Equinox ICRS
- Constellation: Sculptor
- Right ascension: 00^{h} 29^{m} 12.303^{s}
- Declination: −30° 27′ 13.47″
- Apparent magnitude (V): 11.95

Characteristics
- Evolutionary stage: Main sequence
- Spectral type: K7V

Astrometry
Radial velocity (R_{v})	57.4±0.5 km/s
Proper motion (μ)	RA: 150.03±0.03 mas/yr Dec.: −87.13±0.03 mas/yr
Parallax (π)	15.9000±0.0308 mas
Distance	205.1 ± 0.4 ly (62.9 ± 0.1 pc)

Details
Mass	0.650+0.027 −0.029 M_{☉}
Radius	0.651±0.011 R_{☉}
Luminosity (bolometric)	0.132±0.010 L_{☉}
Surface gravity (log g)	4.45±0.15 cgs
Temperature	4316±70 K
Metallicity [Fe/H]	−0.23±0.05 dex
Rotational velocity (v sin i)	1.5±0.3 km/s

Other designations
- 2MASS J00291228-3027133, TIC 251848941, TYC 6991-00475-1

Database references
SIMBAD	data
Exoplanet Archive	data

TOI-178 is a K-type main-sequence star with six known exoplanets. It is in the constellation Sculptor. Which six planets have been observed, at least five of which orbit in a chain of Laplace resonances, which constitute one of the longest chains yet discovered in a system of planets. The system also has unusual variations in the densities among the planets.

The system is 205 light-years away, which is relatively close, implying that such systems may be relatively common. The brightness of the star, TOI-178, facilitates followup observations, which make it an ideal system in which to expand our understanding of planet formation and evolution.

The planetary system was confirmed by data provided by five different planet search projects. After TESS provided first hints at a system with an interesting resonant chain, additional observations to refine the measurement and confirm the finding were provided by CHEOPS, ESPRESSO, NGTS and SPECULOOS. Over the coming years, observations of transit-timing variations in the transits of the various planets, which are expected to range from minutes to tens of minutes, should help pin down the planetary masses and uncover the eccentricities of the various orbits.

== Planetary system ==
Of the six planets, named TOI-178b through TOI-178g as per IAU convention, the outer five are locked in a chain of Laplace resonances. The periods of the planets, in days, revolving around the star are b = 1.91, c = 3.24, d = 6.56, e = 9.96, f = 15.23, and g = 20.71. While this is not a perfect integer ratio, there exists a frame of reference that rotates by roughly 1.37° day^{−1}, in which successive conjunctions of the planets form a repeating pattern. For an observer rotating within this frame of reference, the planets c through g form a chain of resonance that can be expressed as 2:4:6:9:12 in ratios of periods, or as 18:9:6:4:3 in ratios of orbits, which means that for every eighteen revolutions of the planet c, the planet d completes nine, the planet e six, the planet f four, and the planet g three.

In addition, the planet b orbits close to where it would also be a part of the same resonant chain. In a slightly larger orbit of period of ~1.95 days, it would form a 3:5 resonance with the planet c in the same corotating frame of reference as the other five. It is possible that the entire system originally formed in one long resonant chain, but later the innermost planet was pulled out of it, perhaps by tidal interactions.

In 2026, a massive companion orbiting TOI-178, likely a brown dwarf, was detected with high confidence via joint analysis of astrometric and radial-velocity data. The system of six previously-known planets appears stable against the presence of this brown dwarf.

The TOI-178 planetary system
Companion (in order from star)	Mass	Semimajor axis (AU)	Orbital period (days)	Eccentricity	Inclination (°)	Radius
b	1.50+0.39 −0.44 M_{🜨}	0.02607±0.00078	1.914558±0.000018	—	88.8+0.8 −1.3	1.152+0.073 −0.070 R_{🜨}
c	4.77+0.55 −0.68 M_{🜨}	0.0370±0.0011	3.238450+0.000020 −0.000019	—	88.4+1.1 −1.6	1.669+0.114 −0.099 R_{🜨}
d	3.01+0.80 −1.03 M_{🜨}	0.0592±0.0018	6.557700±0.000016	—	88.58+0.20 −0.18	2.572+0.075 −0.078 R_{🜨}
e	3.86+1.25 −0.94 M_{🜨}	0.0783+0.0023 −0.0024	9.961881±0.000042	—	88.71+0.16 −0.13	2.207+0.088 −0.090 R_{🜨}
f	7.72+1.67 −1.52 M_{🜨}	0.1039±0.0031	15.231915+0.000115 −0.000095	—	88.723+0.071 −0.069	2.287+0.108 −0.110 R_{🜨}
g	3.94+1.31 −1.62 M_{🜨}	0.1275+0.0038 −0.0039	20.70950+0.00014 −0.00011	—	88.823+0.045 −0.047	2.87+0.14 −0.13 R_{🜨}
h	21+47 −11 M_{J}	6.9+12.3 −3.3	—	0.76+0.18 −0.35	—	—

== See also ==
- Kepler-80 – another system with five planets in an orbital resonance
- Kepler-223
