= YSES 2 =

Star in the constellation Musca

Observation data Epoch J2000 Equinox ICRS
- Constellation: Musca
- Right ascension: 11^{h} 27^{m} 55.35^{s}
- Declination: −66° 26′ 04.5″
- Apparent magnitude (V): 10.88±0.07

Characteristics
- Evolutionary stage: pre-main sequence
- Spectral type: K1Ve

Astrometry
Proper motion (μ)	RA: −34.025 mas/yr Dec.: +2.319 mas/yr
Parallax (π)	9.1537±0.0118 mas
Distance	356.3 ± 0.5 ly (109.2 ± 0.1 pc)

Details
Mass	1.10±0.03 M_{☉}
Radius	1.193±0.022 R_{☉}
Luminosity	0.65 L_{☉}
Surface gravity (log g)	3.9 cgs
Temperature	4,749±40 K
Rotation	2.7325 days
Rotational velocity (v sin i)	19.3±0.5 km/s
Age	13.9±2.3 Myr

Other designations
- TIC 295777692, TYC 8984-2245-1

Database references
SIMBAD	data

YSES 2 is a young, Sun-like (K-type) star in the constellation of Musca. It is approximately 360 ly from Earth in the Scorpius-Centaurus Association. Its age is 14 million years.

The star was believed to be orbited by the exoplanet YSES 2b, a supposed super-jovian gas giant with 6.3+1.6
−0.9 times the mass of Jupiter that had an estimated separation of 114 AU. It was discovered through direct imaging by Bohn et al. in 2021, but in 2025 was determined to be a background red dwarf star and not a planet.
