= TOI-628 b =

Hot Jupiter orbiting TOI-628

Discovery
- Discovered by: Transiting Exoplanet Survey Satellite
- Discovery date: January 2021
- Detection method: Transit

Designations
- Alternative names: HD 288842 b

Orbital characteristics
- Semi-major axis: 0.0486+0.0008 −0.0009 AU
- Eccentricity: 0.07±0.02
- Orbital period (sidereal): 3.41 days
- Inclination: 88.41+1.00 −0.93
- Star: TOI-628 (HD 288842)

Physical characteristics
- Mean radius: 1.06+0.06 −0.03 R_{J}
- Mass: 6.3±0.3 M_{J}
- Mean density: 6.58+0.70 −0.75 g/cm^{3}
- Temperature: 1586+52 −40 K

TOI-628 b is an exoplanet whose mass is 6.33 times that of Jupiter. It has an orbital period of 3.4 days and was discovered by TESS in January 2021. The planet is classified as hot Jupiter, having an equilibrium temperature of 1,586 K (1,313 °C), and a radius 6% larger than that of Jupiter. It is located 583 light years away from Earth.

The host star of TOI-628 b is TOI-628, also known as HD 288842, a G-type star located in the constellation Monoceros. (Note: Constellation found using a right acension of 06^{h} 37^{m} 3.14^{s} and a declination of 01° 46′ 3.2″ on this website.) It is 1.35 times larger than the Sun, 1.31 times more massive, and has an effective temperature of 6,250 K (5,980 °C). The star has a visual apparent magnitude of 10.112, being not visible to the naked eye. It is moving away from the Sun, with a radial velocity of 20.07 km/s.
