= TOI-640 b =

Gas-giant exoplanet

Discovery
- Discovery site: Transiting Exoplanet Survey Satellite
- Discovery date: 2021
- Detection method: Transit

Orbital characteristics
- Semi-major axis: 0.06608^{+0.00098}_{−0.0011} AU
- Eccentricity: <0.016
- Orbital period (sidereal): 5.003777±0.000003 d
- Inclination: 81.78^{+0.18}_{−0.14} °

Physical characteristics
- Mean radius: 1.829±0.046 R_{J}
- Mass: 0.57±0.02 M_{J}
- Mean density: 0.138±0.013 g/cm³
- Temperature: 1,816 ± 39 K (1,542.8 ± 39.0 °C)

TOI-640 b is an exoplanet that was suspected since 2019. Its discovery has been confirmed by the TESS team in January 2021. It is located 1115 light years away from Earth, orbiting a primary F-class star in a binary star system with red dwarf and has an orbital period of 5 days.

The planet orbits its host star nearly over poles, with misalignment between the orbital plane and equatorial plane of the star been equal to 104°±2°.
