= List of exoplanets discovered in 2023 =

This list of exoplanets discovered in 2023 is a list of confirmed exoplanets that were first reported in 2023. For exoplanets detected only by radial velocity, the listed value for mass is a lower limit. See Minimum mass for more information.

Name	Mass (M_{J})	Radius (R_{J})	Period (days)	Semi-major axis (AU)	Temp. (K)	Discovery method	Distance (ly)	Host star mass (M_{☉})	Host star temp. (K)	Remarks
75 Ceti c	0.9120^{+0.0880}_{−0.1430}		2051.62^{+45.98}_{−40.47}	3.929^{+0.058}_{−0.052}		radial vel.	270.58326 ±2.36023	1.92^{+0.07}_{−0.08}	4809	
AF Leporis b	3.2^{+0.7}_{−0.6}		8030 ±1800	8.4^{+1.1}_{−1.3}	1400 ±300	imaging	87.562 ±0.046	1.20 ±0.06	6130 ±60	Host star also known as HD 35850
AU Microscopii d	0.00331 ±0.00161		12.73596 ±0.00793	0.1108 ±0.0020		timing	32	0.510^{+0.028}_{−0.027}	3678^{+90}_{−88}	Potentially rocky super-Earth. The orbital solution is yet uncertain.
BD-21 397 b	0.7 ±0.1		1891^{+56}_{−48}	2.63^{+0.06}_{−0.05}		radial vel.	77.4046^{+0.0744}_{−0.0740}	0.679 ±0.017	4051 ±239	
BD-21 397 c	2.4^{+1.5}_{−0.7}		6360^{+6260}_{−711}	5.9^{+3.4}_{−0.5}		radial vel.	77.4046^{+0.0744}_{−0.0740}	0.679 ±0.017	4051 ±239	
DMPP-4 b	0.0384^{+0.0057}_{−0.0060}		3.4982^{+0.0022}_{−0.2327}			radial vel.	82.6101^{+0.1246}_{−0.1239}	1.25 ±0.02	6400 ±50	
EPIC 229004835 b	0.0327^{+0.0050}_{−0.0047}	0.2080^{+0.0071}_{−0.0084}	16.141132 ±0.000019	0.1237 ±0.0017	804 ±10	transit	398.255^{+2.867}_{−2.825}	0.970 ±0.040	5868 ±60	
Gliese 328 c	0.0673^{+0.0107}_{−0.0101}		241.8^{+1.3}_{−1.7}	0.657^{+0.026}_{−0.028}		radial vel.	66.96874 ±0.54957	0.65 ±0.08	3897 ±71	
Gliese 367 c	0.0130 ±0.0011		11.5301 ±0.0078			radial vel.	30.69986 ±0.00925	0.455 ±0.011	3522 ±70	
Gliese 367 d	0.0190 ±0.0015		34.369 ±0.073			radial vel.	30.69986 ±0.00925	0.455 ±0.011	3522 ±70	
Gliese 806 b	0.006 ±0.00053	0.11874 ±0.00205	0.9263237 ±0.0000009	0.1406 ±0.0003	940.0 ±10.0	transit	39.348	0.413 ±0.011	3600 ±16	Host star also known as TOI-4481
Gliese 806 c	0.0182 ±0.0009		6.65064 ±0.00025	0.0523 ±0.001	480.0 ±5.0	radial vel.	39.348	0.413 ±0.011	3600 ±16	Host star also known as TOI-4481
GJ 1151 c	0.03341^{+0.00412}_{−0.00463}	0.29	389.7^{+5.4}_{−6.5}	0.5714^{+0.0053}_{−0.0064}		radial vel.	26.23 ±0.01	0.1639 ±0.0093	3143 ±26	Planet on 2-day orbit was suspected but refuted in 2021
GJ 3988 b	0.0116 ±0.0013		6.9442 ±0.0010	0.0405^{+0.0011}_{−0.0012}		radial vel.	32.32369 ±0.01357	0.1842 ±0.0153	3273 ±101	
GJ 9404 b	0.0374 ±0.0060		13.4586^{+0.0044}_{−0.0067}	0.0943 ±0.0036		radial vel.	77.8988^{+0.0828}_{−0.0825}	0.62 ±0.07		
HAT-P-2 c	10.7^{+5.2}_{−2.2}		8500^{+2600}_{−1500}			radial vel.	416.744^{+1.386}_{−1.380}	1.33 ±0.03	6412.830^{+102.682}_{−110.120}	Also known as HD 147506 c
Beta Andromedae b	28.26^{+2.05}_{−2.17}		663.87^{+4.61}_{−4.31}	2.03 ±0.01		radial vel.	199.36184 ±9.26130	2.49	3802	Host star also known as Mirach
HD 6061 b	0.0340±0.0085	0.219±0.008	5.254467±0.000009	0.059±0.001	1194±28	transit	220.548^{+0.670}_{−0.665}	1.00±0.06	5920±110	Also known as TOI-1473 b
HD 15906 b		0.200 ±0.007	10.924709 ±0.000032	0.200 ±0.007	668 ±13	transit	148.6035^{+0.2880}_{−0.2870}	0.790^{+0.020}_{−0.036}	4757 ±89	
HD 15906 c		0.261^{+0.006}_{−0.005}	21.583298^{+0.000052}_{−0.000055}	0.141^{+0.002}_{−0.001}	532 ±10	transit	148.6035^{+0.2880}_{−0.2870}	0.790^{+0.020}_{−0.036}	4757 ±89	
HD 18438 b	21 ±1		803 ±5	2.1 ±0.1		radial vel.	731.066^{+29.409}_{−27.254}	1.84 ±0.09	3860 ±100	
HD 22946 d	<0.08360	0.2326 ±0.0054	47.42489^{+0.00010}_{−0.00011}	0.2958^{+0.0044}_{−0.0042}	546 ±6	transit	204.7581^{+0.3787}_{−0.3370}	1.098^{+0.040}_{−0.039}	6169 ±64	
HD 25463 b	0.0267±0.0098	0.234±0.014	7.049144±0.000009	0.076±0.002	1290±41	transit	148.786^{+0.409}_{−0.407}	1.19±0.07	6220±110	Also known as TOI-554 b.
HD 25463 c	<0.013	0.134±0.011	3.044050±0.000008	0.0435±0.0009	1707±54	transit	148.786^{+0.409}_{−0.407}	1.19±0.07	6220±110	Also known as TOI-554 c.
HD 36384 b	6.6 ±0.5		490 ±3	1.3 ±0.1		radial vel.	682.674^{+11.588}_{−11.210}	1.14 ±0.15	3940 ±40	
HD 73256 c	16 ±1		2690^{+60}_{−102}	3.8 ±0.1		radial vel.	119.7253^{+0.1833}_{−0.1823}	1.00 ±0.05		
HD 74698 b	0.07 ±0.01		15.017 ±0.002	0.121 ±0.001		radial vel.	169.8125^{+0.2479}_{−0.2472}	1.039 ±0.025	5873 ±19	
HD 74698 c	0.40 ±0.06		3449^{+189}_{−210}	4.5 ±0.2		radial vel.	169.8125^{+0.2479}_{−0.2472}	1.039 ±0.025	5873 ±19	
HD 75302 b	5.4^{+0.5}_{−0.4}		4356^{+173}_{−112}	5.3^{+0.2}_{−0.1}		radial vel.	98.9192^{+0.1973}_{−0.1970}	1.06 ±0.05		
HD 89839 b	5.01^{+0.79}_{−0.76}		3441^{+18}_{−17}	4.761 ±0.042		radial vel.	186.9079^{+0.3584}_{−0.3568}	1.21 ±0.03	6314 ±65	
HD 94771 b	0.53 ±0.03		2164^{+21}_{−20}	3.48 ±0.03		radial vel.	188.4552^{+0.3930}_{−0.3911}	1.200 ±0.024	5631 ±21	
HD 99492 c	17.9 ±1.3		95.233^{+0.098}_{−0.096}			radial vel.	59.3728^{+0.1895}_{−0.1882}	0.85 ±0.02	4929 ±44	Host star also known as 83 Leonis
HD 108202 b	3.0^{+0.7}_{−0.5}		2990^{+54}_{−51}	3.7 ±0.1		radial vel.	126.1689^{+0.2202}_{−0.2195}	0.74 ±0.04		
Delta Virginis b	15.83^{+2.33}_{−2.74}		466.63^{+2.33}_{−2.74}	1.33^{+0.08}_{−0.11}		radial vel.	202.45560 ±11.05904	1.4 ±0.3	3657	Host star also known as Minelauva or Auva
HD 135625 b	2.3^{+0.8}_{−0.3}		4055^{+45}_{−44}	5.4 ±0.1		radial vel.	184.3368^{+0.3803}_{−0.3734}	1.28 ±0.06		
HD 135694 b	0.018±0.007	0.224±0.012	15.92346±0.00002	0.120±0.003	815±27	transit	240.936^{+0.469}_{−0.468}	0.90±0.06	5710±110	Also known as TOI-1247 b.
HD 163296 b	0.267			46		disk kinematics	330.15±3.85	2.041±0.395	8291±510	
HD 163296 c	0.189			54		disk kinematics	330.15±3.85	2.041±0.395	8291±510	
HD 163296 d	0.40			84.5		disk kinematics	330.15±3.85	2.041±0.395	8291±510	
HD 163296 e	1			137		disk kinematics	330.15±3.85	2.041±0.395	8291±510	
HD 165131 b	19^{+2}_{−1}		2343 ±2	3.59^{+0.06}_{−0.07}		radial vel.	187.2993^{+0.0689}_{−0.0684}	1.10 ±0.06		
HD 167677 b	3.7^{+1.6}_{−1.1}		1804 ±73	2.9 ±0.1		radial vel.	177.1869^{+0.9031}_{−0.8940}	1.00 ±0.05		
HD 169142 b	3 ±2			37.2 ±1.5		imaging	435.744^{+2.717}_{−2.674}	1.85		
HD 185283 b	1.3^{+0.3}_{−0.1}		4060^{+148}_{−112}	4.6^{+0.2}_{−0.1}		radial vel.	102.3967^{+0.1778}_{−0.1768}	0.80 ±0.04		
HD 207496 b	0.0192 ±0.0050	0.201 ±0.010	6.441008 ±0.000011	0.0629 ±0.0011	743 ±26	transit	77.11 ±0.04	0.80 ±0.04	4819 ±94	
HD 235088 b		0.1824 ±0.0067	7.4341393 ±0.0000062	0.0720 ±0.0026	805^{+13}_{−12}	transit	134.2804 ±0.4612	0.789^{+0.022}_{−0.021}	5037 ±14	Host star also known as TOI-1430
HIP 8152 b	0.025±0.006	0.228±0.017	10.75101±0.00006	0.092±0.002	855±28	transit	331.681^{+1.373}_{−1.360}	0.91±0.06	5530±110	Also known as TOI-266 b.
HIP 8152 c	0.0296±0.0069	0.221±0.017	19.6053±0.0003	0.138±0.003	699±23	transit	331.681^{+1.373}_{−1.360}	0.91±0.06	5530±110	Also known as TOI-266 c.
HIP 9618 b	0.0315 ±0.0098	0.348	20.772907 ±0.000023	0.1438^{+0.0025}_{−0.0037}	663.4^{+9.1}_{−6.3}	transit	220.3112^{+0.5108}_{−0.5085}	1.022^{+0.043}_{−0.076}	5609.0 ±33.0	
HIP 9618 c	<0.0576 ±0.0053	0.298	52.563491 ±0.000072	0.2669^{+0.0046}_{−0.0069}	486.9^{+6.6}_{−4.6}	transit	220.3112^{+0.5108}_{−0.5085}	1.022^{+0.043}_{−0.076}	5609.0 ±33.0	
HIP 29442 c	0.014 ±0.001	1.58^{+0.10}_{−0.11}	3.53796 ±0.00003	0.0436^{+0.0006}_{−0.0007}	1217 ±29	radial vel.	222.4123^{+0.5779}_{−0.5750}	0.89 ±0.04	5289 ±69	Host star also known as TOI-469
HIP 29442 d	0.016 ±0.001	1.37 ±0.11	6.42975^{+0.00009}_{−0.00010}	0.0649^{+0.0009}_{−0.0010}	998.0 ±24.0	radial vel.	222.4123^{+0.5779}_{−0.5750}	0.89 ±0.04	5289 ±69	
HIP 54597 b	2.4^{+0.4}_{−0.2}		3274^{+47}_{−46}	4.0 ±0.1		radial vel.	129.6239^{+0.2166}_{−0.2162}	0.80 ±0.04		
HIP 81208 C b	14.8 ±0.4		104100^{+107260}_{−40934}	23.04^{+13.88}_{−6.55}	2050^{+35}_{−20}	imaging	481.188^{+4.837}_{−4.472}	0.135^{+0.010}_{−0.013}		
HIP 113103 b		0.163	7.610303 ±0.000018	0.06899^{+0.00029}_{−0.00023}	721 ±10	transit	150.7239^{+0.2818}_{−0.2805}	0.761 ±0.038	4930 ±100	
HIP 113103 c		0.2141	14.245648 ±0.000019	0.10479^{+0.00045}_{−0.00035}	585 ±10	transit	150.7239^{+0.2818}_{−0.2805}	0.761 ±0.038	4930 ±100	
HN Librae b	0.0172 ±0.0024		36.116^{+0.027}_{−0.029}	0.1417 ±0.0023	234.4^{+5.5}_{−5.3}	radial vel.	20.36655 ±0.01453	0.291 ±0.013	3347 ±50	Habitable zone planet. Host star also known as Gliese 555
K2-312 c	5.41+^{+0.52}_{−0.44}		921.2 ±10.8	1.961 ±0.027		radial vel.	358.315^{+2.645}_{−2.609}	1.18 ±0.04	5959 ±61	
K2-415b	0.0094 ±0.0085	0.091 ±0.005	4.0179694 ±0.0000027	0.0270 ±0.0002	412 ±9	transit	71.126 ±0.030	0.1635 ±0.0041	3173 ±53	
K2-416 b	<5.2	0.241^{+0.027}_{−0.0152}	13.1020^{+0.0026}_{−0.0024}	0.0880^{+0.0100}_{−0.0210}	447 ±49	transit	392.402^{+1.973}_{−1.954}	0.548 ±0.012	3746 ±72	
K2-417 b	<2.2	0.295^{+0.012}_{−0.011}	6.5350 ±0.0014	0.063^{+0.006}_{−0.014}	558 ±55	transit	306.7249^{+0.9860}_{−0.9794}	0.569 ±0.012	3861 ±77	
K2-2016-BLG-0005L b	1.16 ±0.09	1.23	4700 ^{+3000}_{−700}	4.11 ±0.32		microlensing	16960	0.574 ±0.037		Gas giant.
Kepler-10 d	0.03990 ±0.00705		151.04 ±0.45	0.5379 ±0.0044		radial vel.	605.039^{+2.645}_{−2.626}	0.910 ±0.021	5708 ±28	
Kepler-68 e	0.272 ±0.032		3455 ^{+348}_{−169}	4.60 ^{+0.32}_{−0.16}		radial vel.	470.2	1.057 ^{+0.022}_{−0.020}	5847 ±75	
Kepler-58 d		0.1509503920	4.458169937			transit		1.017 ^{+0.167}_{−0.125}	6100^{+193}_{−214}	
Kepler-164 e		0.3570351276	94.8864975			transit		0.966 ^{+0.075}_{−0.068}	5888 ^{+106}_{−117}	
Kepler-290 d		0.0794273806	0.764007986			transit		0.84 ^{+0.065}_{−0.09}	5142 ±153	
Kepler-297 d		0.6351157298	150.0209961			transit		0.846 ^{+0.059}_{−0.049}	5618 ±112	
Kepler-311 d		0.1849409870	232.0469971			transit		0.974 ^{+0.082}_{−0.062}	5903 ^{+106}_{−117}	
Kepler-347 d		0.2346332985	85.51660156			transit		1 ±0.072	5592 ±75	
Kepler-416 d		0.1543405297	3.076410055			transit		0.949 ^{+0.067}_{−0.055}	5670 ±114	
Kepler-549 d		0.4055676538	24.6147995			transit		0.859 ^{+0.06}_{−0.033}	5312 ±79	
Kepler-618 d		0.3911149410	11.67889977			transit		1.041 ±0.139	6122 ^{+169}_{−190}	
Kepler-656 c		0.1360516194	5.254559994			transit		1.05^{+0.075}_{−0.113}	5550 ^{+166}_{−183}	
Kepler-763 c		0.1464004690	4.096680164			transit		0.8 ^{+0.048}_{−0.028}	4999 ±79	
Kepler-763 d		0.1754842890	6.503270149			transit		0.8 ^{+0.048}_{−0.028}	4999 ±79	
Kepler-784 c		0.1583551639	17.15699959			transit		1.016 ^{+0.093}_{−0.084}	5676 ^{+115}_{−104}	
Kepler-864 c		0.157641449	2.421489954			transit		1.27 ^{+0.142}_{−0.156}	6213 ^{+173}_{−259}	
Kepler-865 c		0.09474546031	6.209179878			transit		0.782 ^{+0.116}_{−0.062}	5440 ±162	
Kepler-880 c		0.2816491659	11.80609989			transit		1.714 ^{+0.17}_{−0.316}	6900 ^{+184}_{−204}	
Kepler-896 c		0.2770100246	29.54210091			transit		0.877 ^{+0.083}_{−0.092}	5510 ^{+166}_{−149}	
Kepler-949 c		0.4607912263	20.99720001			transit		0.813 ^{+0.104}_{−0.064}	5211 ^{+181}_{−163}	
Kepler-975 c		0.5035248257	5.05821991			transit		0.951 ^{+0.198}_{−0.144}	4883 ^{+146}_{−132}	
Kepler-1052 c		0.2112591764	180.9259949			transit		0.937 ^{+0.09}_{−0.121}	5818 ^{+139}_{−157}	
Kepler-1126 c		0.1500582511	199.6679993			transit		0.794 ^{+0.071}_{−0.03}	5678 ^{+113}_{−102}	
Kepler-1162 c		0.1675442283	59.28409958			transit		0.861 ^{+0.05}_{−0.041}	5225 ^{+83}_{−73}	
Kepler-1181 c		0.1555895228	8.934909821			transit		1.336 ±0.2	6688 ^{+187}_{−281}	
Kepler-1471 c		0.2001966118	11.60449982			transit		0.934 ^{+0.063}_{−0.045}	5533 ^{+83}_{−74}	
Kepler-1487 c		0.7992697886	35.79949951			transit		1.801 ^{+0.193}_{−0.359}	5745 ^{+86}_{−77}	
Kepler-1491 c		0.2788835142	61.5685997			transit		0.991 ^{+0.079}_{−0.065}	5626 ±77	
Kepler-1513 c	0.266 ^{+0.098}_{−0.063}		841.4^{+8.1}_{−5.3}			transit		0.943 ±0.037	5491 ±100	
Kepler-1518 c		0.212775814	9.630929947			transit		1.06 ^{+0.177}_{−0.133}	6432^{+155}_{−214}	
Kepler-1610 c		0.196806485	44.98529816			transit		0.825 ^{+0.096}_{−0.078}	5295 ±185	
Kepler-1669 d		0.1427426870	4.729469776			transit		0.609 ±0.033	4224 ±84	
Kepler-1801 c		0.3621203501	116.5849991			transit		0.936 ^{+0.114}_{−0.093}	5738 ^{+156}_{−173}	
Kepler-1814 c		0.1476494621	0.626281977			transit		0.79 ^{+0.073}_{−0.064}	4922 ±169	
Kepler-1834 c		0.129895841	0.766691983			transit		0.765 ^{+0.051}_{−0.028}	4821 ±76	
Kepler-1859 c		0.1531807444	3.596430063			transit		1.09 ^{+0.07}_{−0.078}	5887 ^{+70}_{−79}	
Kepler-1894 c		0.1417613278	5.053750038			transit		0.999 ^{+0.114}_{−0.125}	5772 ^{+156}_{−173}	
Kepler-1921 c		0.1505043216	3.157219887			transit		1.251 ^{+0.19}_{−0.233}	6120 ^{+195}_{−217}	
Kepler-1976 b		1.043	4.96			transit		1.097 ^{+0.21}_{−0.135}	6117 ^{+156}_{−210}	
Kepler-1977 b		0.1625482348	4.537000179			transit		0.769 ^{+0.053}_{−0.079}	4805 ±144	
Kepler-1978 b		0.2683562384	10.849699997			transit		0.869 ^{+0.06}_{−0.095}	5251 ±158	
Kepler-1980 b		0.2538143392	33.0257988			transit		1.049 ^{+0.059}_{−0.073}	5819 ^{+69}_{−87}	
Kepler-1981 b		0.8396838173	453.5429993			transit		1.519 ^{+0.15}_{−0.376}	5874 ^{+87}_{−79}	
Kepler-1982 b		0.773130047	3.823159933			transit		1.213 ^{+0.076}_{−0.093}	6202 ^{+99}_{−149}	
Kepler-1983 b		0.1465788952	7.328519821			transit		0.812 ^{+0.058}_{−0.029}	5135 ^{+84}_{−75}	
Kepler-1984 b		0.718709408	1.99285996			transit		0.42 ^{+0.046}_{−0.056}	3638 ^{+72}_{−87}	
Kepler-1985 b		0.1981446855	3.420650005			transit		0.877 ^{+0.064}_{−0.037}	3638 ^{+72}_{−87}	
Kepler-1986 b		0.2631818295	19.54929924			transit		0.776 ^{+0.089}_{−0.065}	5549 ±163	
Kepler-1987 b		0.134713408	2.345860004			transit		0.799 ^{+0.041}_{−0.081}	4769 ±172	
Kepler-1987 c		0.151307244	3.648269892			transit		0.799 ^{+0.041}_{−0.081}	4769 ±172	
Kepler-1987 d		0.2912843007	5.644889832			transit		0.799 ^{+0.041}_{−0.081}	4769 ±172	
Kepler-1987 e		0.2188423849	8.742970467			transit		0.799 ^{+0.041}_{−0.081}	4769 ±172	
Kepler-1988 b		0.1382819717	1.549999952			transit		1.127 ^{+0.189}_{−0.172}	6033 ±183	
Kepler-1989 b		0.4247487156	10.16100025			transit		0.999 ^{+0.153}_{−0.126}	6032 ^{+189}_{−232}	
Kepler-1990 b		0.3491842959	1.735129952			transit		1.028 ^{+0.074}_{−0.067}	5751 ^{+103}_{−114}	
Kepler-1990 c		0.1058972326	1.187000036			transit		1.028 ^{+0.074}_{−0.067}	5751 ^{+103}_{−114}	
Kepler-1991 b		0.1646893688	13.26080036			transit		0.914 ^{+0.061}_{−0.042}	5478 ^{+82}_{−74}	
Kepler-1991 c		0.2594348291	22.79019928			transit		0.914 ^{+0.061}_{−0.042}	5478 ^{+82}_{−74}	
Kepler-1992 b		0.0916229564	15.61120033			transit		0.874 ^{+0.048}_{−0.054}	5383 ±107	
Kepler-1993 b		0.3949511704	26.65660095			transit		1.373 ^{+0.205}_{−0.512}	5159 ^{+171}_{−155}	
Kepler-1994 b		0.0555001398	4.612319946			transit		0.932 ^{+0.052}_{−0.047}	5495 ^{+74}_{−82}	
Kepler-1995 b		0.4119018693	73.75779724			transit		0.847 ^{+0.068}_{−0.049}	5029 ^{+192}_{−174}	
Kepler-1996 b		0.204657316	32.37609863			transit		0.748 ^{+0.027}_{−0.043}	4580 ±92	
Kepler-1996 c		0.2509594797	92.72949982			transit		0.748 ^{+0.027}_{−0.043}	4580 ±92	
Kepler-1997 b		0.2179502440	26.75749969			transit		1.111 ±0.153	6215 ^{+194}_{−259}	
Kepler-1998 b		0.0619324805	3.03263998			transit		0.962 ^{+0.054}_{−0.068}	5640 ^{+101}_{−113}	
Kepler-1999 b		0.3169779722	8.739450455			transit		0.632 ^{+0.063}_{−0.057}	4406 ^{+154}_{−170}	
Kepler-2000 b		0.2961910652	6.383150101			transit		0.581 ±0.029	3757 ^{+74}_{−82}	
Kepler-2000 c		0.1963604037	20.6182003			transit		0.581 ±0.029	3757 ^{+74}_{−82}	
Kepler-2001 b		0.1062540847	1.190999985			transit		0.864 ^{+0.049}_{−0.085}	5081 ^{+166}_{−136}	
Kepler-2001 c		0.3639938397	14.09449959			transit		0.864 ^{+0.049}_{−0.085}	5081 ^{+166}_{−136}	
KMT-2016-BLG-0625L b	0.05 ±0.04			1.40 ±0.17		microlensing	21000 ±2000	0.25 ±0.14		
KMT-2016-BLG-1105L b	0.00415 ±0.00176			2.26^{+0.51}_{−0.69}		microlensing	10665^{+4175}_{−3751}	0.43 ±0.18		
KMT-2016-BLG-1751L b	1.20 ±1.21			1.39 ±0.50		microlensing	23000 ±4000	0.18 ±0.18		
KMT-2017-BLG-0428L b	0.0175^{+0.0111}_{−0.0088}			1.85^{+0.55}_{−0.60}		microlensing	17612^{+5936}_{−8480}	0.34^{+0.22}_{−0.17}		
KMT-2017-BLG-1003L b	0.0117^{+0.0117}_{−0.0057}			1.25^{+0.27}_{−0.25}		microlensing	23353^{+1990}_{−2120}	0.27^{+0.26}_{−0.13}		
KMT-2017-BLG-1194L b	0.0111^{+0.0061}_{−0.0051}			1.78^{+0.45}_{−0.46}		microlensing	13829^{+7045}_{−5577}	0.41^{+0.23}_{−0.19}		
KMT-2019-BLG-0298L b	1.81 ±0.96			5.67 ±2.70		microlensing	22000 ±5000	0.70 ±0.37		
KMT-2019-BLG-1216L b	0.094 ±0.050			2.44 ±1.12		microlensing	9000 ±3000	0.39 ±0.21		
KMT-2019-BLG-1367L b	0.0128^{+0.0081}_{−0.0065}			1.70^{+0.50}_{−0.56}		microlensing	15231^{+7990}_{−6849}	0.25^{+0.16}_{−0.13}		
KMT-2019-BLG-1806L b	0.0147 ±0.0048			2.87^{+0.64}_{−0.66}		microlensing	21592^{+2348}_{−6295}	0.75^{+0.24}_{−0.25}		
KMT-2019-BLG-2783L b	1.16 ±0.77			1.85 ±0.93		microlensing	19000 ±5000	0.34 ±0.25		
KMT-2021-BLG-0712L b	0.1255^{+0.0648}_{−0.0374}			2.29^{+0.64}_{−0.42}		microlensing	10437^{+2968}_{−2188}	0.23^{+0.12}_{−0.07}		
KMT-2021-BLG-0909L b	1.26^{+1.01}_{−0.66}			1.75 ±0.42		microlensing	21134^{+3262}_{−4501}	0.38^{+0.30}_{−0.20}		
KMT-2021-BLG-1105L b	1.30 ±0.68			3.54 ±1.06		microlensing	14807 ±5447	0.63 ±0.33		
KMT-2021-BLG-2010 b	1.07^{+1.15}_{−0.68}			1.79^{+0.30}_{−0.38}		microlensing	23000^{+4000}_{−5000}	0.37^{+0.4}_{−0.23}		Multiple orbital solutions
KMT-2021-BLG-2478L b	0.900^{+0.420}_{−0.240}			1.85 ±0.31		microlensing	9687 ±2348	0.20^{+0.10}_{−0.05}		
KMT-2022-BLG-0371 b	0.26^{+0.13}_{−0.11}			3.02^{+0.45}_{−0.56}		microlensing	23000^{+3000}_{−4000}	0.63^{+0.32}_{−0.28}		Multiple orbital solutions
KMT-2022-BLG-0440L b	0.0485^{+0.0302}_{−0.0233}			1.9 ±0.7		microlensing	11000 ±5000	0.53^{+0.31}_{−0.26}		
KMT-2022-BLG-1013 b	0.31^{+0.46}_{−0.16}			1.38^{+0.18}_{−0.20}		microlensing	25000 ±3000	0.18^{+0.28}_{−0.10}		
L 363-38 b	0.0147 ±0.0014		8.781 ±0.006	0.048 ±0.006	330	radial vel.	33.372 ±0.014	0.210 ±77	3129 ±6	
LHS 3154 b	0.0414 ±0.0026		3.71778^{+0.00080}_{−0.00081}	0.02262 ±0.00018		radial vel.	51.43 ±0.03	0.1118 ±0.0027	2861 ±77	
LHS 475 b	0.002876 ±0.000588	0.0883 ±0.0045	2.029088 ±0.000006	0.0206	586.0	transit	40.704	0.262	3312.0	Host star also known as TOI-910 Also the first exoplanet confirmed by the James Webb Space Telescope.
LP 791-18 d	0.0028 ^{+0.0016}_{−0.0013}	0.09207^{+0.00393}_{−0.00384}	2.753436 ±0.000013	0.01992 ±0.00024	395.5^{+2.6}_{−2.3}	transit	86.4077^{+0.20874}_{−0.20809}	0.139 ±0.005	2960 ±55	
MOA-2016-BLG-0532L b	0.39 ±0.31			1.09 ±0.17		microlensing	24000 ±2000	0.09 ±0.07		
MOA-2020-BLG-208L b	0.14^{+0.13}_{−0.08}			2.74^{+0.43}_{−0.47}		microlensing	24400 ^{+3200}_{−3700}	0.43 ^{+0.39}_{−0.23}		
MOA-2022-BLG-249Lb	0.015 ±0.005			1.63 ±0.35		microlensing	6500 ±1400	0.18 ±0.05		
MWC 758 c				100	500 ±100	imaging	159.537 ^{+1.742}_{−1.706}	1.5		
OGLE-2016-BLG-1635L b	11.49 ±7.96			1.34 ±0.47		microlensing	22000 ±5000	0.43 ±0.29		
OGLE-2016-BLG-1850L b	0.03 ±0.01			1.46 ±0.16		microlensing	7000 ±2000	0.26 ±0.11		
OGLE-2017-BLG-1806L b	0.0166 ^{+0.0148}_{−0.0086}			1.75^{+0.46}_{−0.47}		microlensing	20870^{+2510}_{−4920}	0.38^{+0.34}_{−0.20}		
OGLE-2019-BLG-0249L b	7.12 ±1.47			1.84 ±0.44		microlensing	21000 ±3000	0.91 ±0.19		
OGLE-2019-BLG-0679L b	3.34 ±1.90			6.99 ±3.21		microlensing	18000 ±6000	0.66 ±0.38		
Rho Coronae Borealis e	0.0119^{+0.0017}_{−0.0017}		12.949 ±0.014	0.1061 ±0.0011		radial vel.	56.7901^{+0.0786}_{−0.0783}	0.95 ±0.01	5817 ±24	
TIC 279401253 b	6.14^{+0.39}_{−0.42}	1.00 ±0.04	76.80 ±0.06	0.369 ±0.003		transit	937 ±6	1.13^{+0.02}_{−0.03}	5951 ±80	
TIC 279401253 c	8.02 ±0.18		155.3 ±0.7	0.591^{+0.005}_{−0.006}		radial vel.	937 ±6	1.13^{+0.02}_{−0.03}	5951 ±80	
TIC 365102760 b	0.06	0.55	4.21285	0.0622 ±0.0049		transit	1810 ±20	1.21^{+0.06}_{−0.05}	4694^{+27}_{−20}	Still have an atmosphere despite high temperatures and low mass
TOI-139 b	0.0208	0.219^{+0.019}_{−0.011}	11.070850^{+0.000024}_{−0.000030}		561.17	transit	138.4	0.6900 ±0.0852	4570 ±50	
TOI-181 b	0.1452^{+0.0085}_{−0.0240}	0.6339^{+0.0079}_{−0.0092}	4.532000 ±0.000002	0.0539^{+0.0043}_{−0.0036}	895.10^{+32.14}_{−33.86}	transit	313.873^{+1.886}_{−1.864}	0.822 ±0.040	4994 ±50	
TOI-198 b		0.128 ±0.007	10.21520 ±0.00006	0.100 ±0.006	368 ±26	transit	77.38461 ±0.08659	0.467 ±0.023	3650 ±75	
TOI-199 b	0.17 ±0.02	0.810 ±0.005	104.854^{+0.001}_{−0.002}	0.4254 ±0.0020		transit	333.561^{+0.623}_{−0.620}	0.936^{+0.003}_{−0.005}	5255^{+12}_{−10}	
TOI-199 c	0.28^{+0.02}_{−0.01}		273.69^{+0.26}_{−0.22}	0.807 ±0.003		transit	333.561^{+0.623}_{−0.620}	0.936^{+0.003}_{−0.005}	5255^{+12}_{−10}	
TOI-238 b	0.0107^{+0.00145}_{−0.00142}	0.1278^{+0.00765}_{−0.00784}	1.2730988 ±0.0000029	0.02118 ±0.00038	1311 ±28	transit	261.328 ±0.312	0.79 ±0.022	5059 ±89	
TOI-244 b	0.00843 ±0.00094	0.136 ±0.011	7.397225^{+0.000026}_{−0.000023}	0.0559 ±0.0013	458 ±20	transit	71.8644^{+0.0334}_{−0.0333}	0.428 ±0.029	3433 ±100	
TOI-262 b		0.185 ±0.013	11.14529 ±0.00003	0.163 ±0.002	584 ±45	transit	143.287^{+0.383}_{−0.381}	0.913 ±0.029	5310 ±124	
TOI-277 b	0.0308	0.276^{+0.026}_{−0.013}	3.994086^{+0.000008}_{−0.000009}		739.9	transit	211.7	0.5204 ±0.0203	3748 ±64	
TOI-332 b	0.180 ±0.005	0.285^{+0.014}_{−0.010}	0.777038 ±0.000001	0.0159 ±0.0001	1871^{+30}_{−25}	transit	726.847^{+12.231}_{−11.836}	0.88 ±0.02	5251 ±71	
TOI-444 b		0.247 ±0.018	17.96360 ±0.00004	0.133 ±0.006	609 ±61	transit	187.205^{+0.270}_{−0.269}	0.960 ±0.130	5225 ±70	
TOI-470 b		0.387 ±0.026	12.19148 ±0.00003	0.119 ±0.008	660 ±70	transit	425.50^{+1.31}_{−1.30}	0.87 ±0.09	5190 ±90	
TOI-615 b	0.435^{+0.086}_{−0.082}	1.693^{+0.052}_{−0.057}	4.6615983^{+0.0000025}_{−0.0000016}	0.0678^{+0.0031}_{−0.0026}	1666 ±24	transit	1155 ±6	1.449 ±0.087	6850 ±100	
TOI-622 b	0.303^{+0.069}_{−0.072}	0.824^{+0.028}_{−0.029}	6.402513^{+0.000031}_{−0.000054}	0.0708^{+0.0052}_{−0.0059}	1388 ±22	transit	400.2 ±0.6	1.313 ±0.079	6400 ±100	
TOI-669 b	0.0308±0.0047	0.232±0.015	3.94515±0.00002	0.047±0.001	1235±37	transit	465.970^{+2.789}_{−2.759}	0.90±0.06	5600±110	
TOI-672 b	0.0760	0.470^{+0.008}_{−0.009}	3.633575 ±0.000001		676.15	transit		0.5399 ±0.0204	3765 ±65	
TOI-700 e	0.0025730809	0.08502^{+0.00794}_{−0.00669}	27.80978^{+0.00046}_{−0.0004}	0.134 ±0.0022	350	transit	101.52	0.416 ±0.01	3480 ±135	Habitable zone planet
TOI-715 b		0.1383 ±0.0057	19.288004^{+0.000027}_{−0.000024}	0.0830 ±0.0027	234 ±12	transit	138.306^{+0.280}_{−0.279}	0.240 ±0.012	3075 ±75	
TOI-733 b	0.0180 ±0.0022	0.178 ±0.008	4.884765^{+0.000019}_{−0.000024}	0.0618^{+0.0036}_{−0.0039}	1055.8^{+36.2}_{−31.3}	transit	245.5 ±0.2	0.956^{+0.050}_{−0.026}	5585 ±60	
TOI-771 b	0.00881^{+0.00629}_{−0.00283}	0.127^{+0.00964}_{−0.00767}	2.326021 ±0.000001	0.0207 ±0.0008	527.19 ±22.08	transit	82.452 ±0.130	0.220^{+0.024}_{−0.023}	3201^{+100}_{−95}	
TOI-778 b	2.8 ±0.2	1.37 ±0.04	4.633611 ±0.000001	0.060 ±0.003	1561^{+33}_{−32}	transit	527.536^{+3.663}_{−3.614}	1.40 ±0.05	6643 ±150	
TOI-784 b	0.03043^{+0.00261}_{−0.00258}	0.172^{+0.010}_{−0.008}	2.7970365^{+0.0000031}_{−0.0000030}	0.038 ±0.001		transit	210.696^{+0.360}_{−0.359}	0.910 ±0.100	5558 ±100	Also known as HD 307842.
TOI-836 b	0.0143^{+0.0029}_{−0.0027}	0.1520 ±0.0060	3.81673 ±0.00001	0.04220 ±0.00093	871 ±36	transit	89.7009^{+0.0959}_{−0.0956}	0.665 ±0.010	4552 ±154	
TOI-858B b	1.10^{+0.08}_{−0.07}	1.255 ±0.039	3.2797178 ±0.0000014	0.04435^{+0.00100}_{−0.00098}	1529^{+23}_{−22}	transit	816.987^{+4.951}_{−4.892}	1.081^{+0.076}_{−0.070}	5842^{+84}_{−79}	
TOI-871 b	0.0120^{+0.00849}_{−0.00440}	0.148^{+0.0102}_{−0.0101}	14.362565 ±0.00009	0.1054 ±0.0021	621 ±16.05	transit	221.917 ±0.489	0.758^{+0.046}_{−0.044}	4929^{+80}_{−75}	
TOI-908 b	0.050773^{+0.012938}_{−0.012708}	0.2842 ±0.0138	3.183792 ±0.000007	0.041657 ±0.000002	1317 ±38	transit	573.214^{+0.638}_{−0.634}	0.950 ±0.010	5626 ±61	
TOI-913 b	0.0208	0.219^{+0.011}_{−0.009}	11.098644^{+0.000587}_{−0.000581}		712.01	transit	212.1	0.8200 ±0.0973	4969 ±129	
TOI-1052 b	0.0532 ±0.0053	0.256^{+0.026}_{−0.021}	9.139703^{+0.00062}_{−0.00063}	0.09103^{+0.00062}_{−0.00063}	1135	transit	423.365^{+1.826}_{−1.810}	1.204 ±0.025	6146 ±62	
TOI-1052 c	0.108^{+0.013}_{−0.012}		35.806^{+0.453}_{−0.381}	0.2263^{+0.0024}_{−0.0023}	719	radial vel.	423.365^{+1.826}_{−1.810}	1.204 ±0.025	6146 ±62	
TOI-1194 b	0.456^{+0.055}_{−0.051}	0.767^{+0.045}_{−0.041}	2.310644 ±0.000001	0.03428 ±0.00055	1391^{+38}_{−37}	transit	488.149^{+2.136}_{−2.117}	1.007^{+0.050}_{−0.048}	5446^{+51}_{−48}	
TOI-1221 b	<3.5	0.260^{+0.012}_{−0.011}	91.68278^{+0.00032}_{−0.00041}	0.387^{+0.026}_{−0.023}	440 ±60	transit	451.437^{+1.262}_{−1.259}	0.930 ±0.220	5592 ±50	
TOI-1338 c	0.205 ±0.037		215.5 ±3.3	0.794 ±0.016		radial vel.	1318 ±5	1.13+0.31	6160	Circumbinary planet
TOI-1408 b	1.69 ±0.20	1.5	4.4247110 ±0.0000016	0.05804 ±0.00020		transit	454.937^{+1.363}_{−1.360}	1.331 ±0.014	6306 ±32	
TOI-1410 b	0.0334	0.290^{+0.014}_{−0.010}	1.216901 ±0.000038		1181.44	transit	236.8	0.7960 ±0.0370	4668 ±50	
TOI-1416 b	0.0109 ±0.0015	0.145 ±0.007	1.0697568 ±0.0000028	0.0190 ±0.0003	1517 ±39	transit	179.430^{+0.253}_{−0.252}	0.798^{+0.035}_{−0.044}	4884 ±70	
TOI-1420 b	0.0790 ±0.0120	1.061 ±0.029	6.9561063 ±0.0000017	0.0710 ±0.0012	957 ±17	transit	658.569^{+0.918}_{−0.911}	0.9870 ±0.0480	5510 ±110	
TOI-1467 b	0.0138^{+0.0101}_{−0.00535}	0.164^{+0.0142}_{−0.0139}	5.971143 ±0.000006	0.0510 ±0.0009	558.89 ±16.37	transit	122.113 ±0.196	0.498^{+0.026}_{−0.025}	3810^{+73}_{−78}	
TOI-1470 b	0.0230^{+0.0038}_{−0.0039}	0.194 ±0.004	2.527093^{+0.000004}_{−0.000003}	0.0285 ±0.0004	734	transit	169.439 ±0.243	0.471 ±0.011	3709 ±11	
TOI-1470 c	0.02278^{+0.00903}_{−0.00872}	0.220 ±0.002	18.08816^{+0.00006}_{−0.00008}	0.106 ±0.001	373	transit	169.439 ±0.243	0.471 ±0.011	3709 ±11	
TOI-1669 b	0.573 ±0.074		502 ±16			radial vel.	362.934^{+1.210}_{−1.200}	1.00 ±0.05	5542.3 ±100.0	
TOI-1680 b	0.0100 ^{+0.0035}_{−0.0022}	0.131 ^{+0.00562}_{−0.00437}	4.8026345^{+0.0000040}_{−0.0000039}	0.03144^{+0.00025}_{−0.00026}	404 ±14	transit	121.1	1.1798 ±0.0044	3225^{+99}_{−100}	super-Earth planet
TOI-1694 b	0.0809	0.487^{+0.042}_{−0.071}	3.770179^{+0.000058}_{−0.000060}		1136.57	transit	405.7	0.8450 ±0.1089	5135 ±50	
TOI-1694 c	1.05 ±0.05		389.2 ±3.9			radial vel.	405.7	0.8450 ±0.1089	5135 ±50	
TOI-1736 b	0.040 ±0.016	0.223 ±0.016	7.073088 ±0.000007	0.0740 ±0.0009	1076 ±39	transit	290.111^{+1.050}_{−1.043}	1.08 ±0.04	5807 ±46	
TOI-1736 c	8.70^{+1.50}_{−0.60}		570.1 ±0.7	1.381 ±0.017	249 ±9	radial vel.	290.111^{+1.050}_{−1.043}	1.08 ±0.04	5807 ±46	
TOI-1739 b	0.0126^{+0.00849}_{−0.00472}	0.151^{+0.00874}_{−0.00758}	8.303342^{+0.000011}_{−0.000013}	0.0742 ±0.0014	755.55 ±20.19	transit	231.506 ±0.522	0.790^{+0.046}_{−0.045}	4922^{+94}_{−91}	
TOI-1801 b	0.0158	0.187^{+0.005}_{−0.006}	10.643976^{+0.000014}_{−0.000014}		490.47	transit	100.8	0.5413 ±0.0204	3815 ±157	
TOI-1811 b	0.9720^{+0.0760}_{−0.0780}	0.9940^{+0.0250}_{−0.0230}	3.7130765 ±0.0000017	0.04389^{+0.00058}_{−0.00055}	962.2^{+8.0}_{−7.9}	transit	418.231^{+2.319}_{−2.296}	0.817^{+0.033}_{−0.030}	4766^{+52}_{−54}	
TOI-1853 b	0.0406	0.325^{+0.020}_{−0.016}	1.243702^{+0.000121}_{−0.000114}		1510.96	transit	539 ±3	0.8200 ±0.0992	5175 ±50	
TOI-1859 b		0.87 ±0.07	63.48347 ±0.00010	0.337^{+0.044}_{−0.036}		transit	731.847^{+3.826}_{−3.787}	1.287 ±0.061	6341^{+68}_{−70}	
TOI-1937A b	2.01^{+0.17}_{−0.16}	1.247^{+0.059}_{−0.062}	0.946679944 ±0.00000047	0.01932^{+0.00035}_{−0.00039}	2097^{+35}_{−36}	transit	1353.99^{+9.55}_{−9.42}	1.072^{+0.059}_{−0.064}	5814^{+91}_{−93}	
TOI-2000 b	0.0347^{+0.0077}_{−0.0075}	0.241 ±0.014	3.098330^{+0.000021}_{−0.000019}	0.04271^{+0.00076}_{−0.00067}	1488^{+122}_{−160}	transit	30.3424 ±0.0685	1.082^{+0.059}_{−0.050}	5611^{+85}_{−82}	
TOI-2000 c	0.0257^{+0.015}_{−0.014}	0.727^{+0.028}_{−0.027}	9.1270550^{+0.0000073}_{−0.0000072}	0.0878^{+0.0016}_{−0.0014}	1038^{+84}_{−111}	transit	30.3424 ±0.0685	1.082^{+0.059}_{−0.050}	5611^{+85}_{−82}	
TOI-2010 b	1.286^{+0.055}_{−0.057}	1.054 ±0.027	141.834025^{+0.000065}_{−0.000066}	0.5516^{+0.0078}_{−0.0093}	400.2^{+5.6}_{−5.7}	transit	356.131^{+1.050}_{−1.044}	1.112^{+0.048}_{−0.055}	5929 ±74	
TOI-2015 b	0.0516±0.0129	0.302±0.012	3.348968±0.000004	0.0301^{+0.0013}_{−0.0012}	512±11	transit	154.34^{+0.13}_{−0.10}	0.342^{+0.021}_{−0.025}	3194±56	
TOI-2018 b	0.0185	0.204^{+0.009}_{−0.007}	7.435588 ±0.000009		652.44	transit		0.6600 ±0.0868	4348 ±100	
TOI-2068 b	0.0138^{+0.0101}_{−0.00503}	0.162^{+0.0145}_{−0.0133}	7.768915^{+0.000025}_{−0.000037}	0.0632 ±0.0011	520.62 ±14.18	transit	172.635^{+0.294}_{−0.261}	0.559^{+0.027}_{−0.029}	3710^{+57}_{−58}	
TOI-2084 b		0.220 ±0.012	6.0784247 ±0.0000096	0.05006 ±0.00103	527 ±8	transit	373.609^{+1.115}_{−1.106}	0.453^{+0.029}_{−0.027}	3551^{+49}_{−52}	
TOI-2095 b		0.116 ±0.009	17.664872^{+0.000045}_{−0.000051}	0.1010^{+0.0088}_{−0.0084}	347 ±9	transit	136.73 ±0.08	0.465 ±0.012	3662 ±130	
TOI-2095 c		0.124^{+0.010}_{−0.009}	28.17221^{+0.00011}_{−0.00014}	0.138^{+0.012}_{−0.011}	297 ±8	transit	136.73 ±0.08	0.465 ±0.012	3662 ±130	
TOI-2096 b	0.0060^{+0.0044}_{−0.0019}	0.110 ±0.006	3.1190633^{+0.000010}_{−0.0000093}	0.025 ±0.001	445 ±13	transit	158.08 ±0.13	0.231 ±0.012	3300 ±50	
TOI-2096 c	0.0145^{+0.0110}_{−0.0057}	0.171 ±0.008	6.387840 ±0.000012	0.040 ±0.002	349^{+10}_{−9}	transit	158.08 ±0.13	0.231 ±0.012	3300 ±50	
TOI-2134 b	0.0287^{+0.0025}_{−0.0024}	0.240 ±0.014	9.2292005 ±0.0000063	0.0780 ±0.0009	666 ±8	transit	73.7773^{+0.0522}_{−0.0519}	0.744 ±0.027	4580 ±50	
TOI-2134 c	0.1318^{+0.0242}_{−0.0246}	0.649 ±0.037	95.50^{+0.36}_{−0.25}	0.371 ±0.004	306 ±4	transit	73.7773^{+0.0522}_{−0.0519}	0.744 ±0.027	4580 ±50	
TOI-2141 b	0.075 ±0.012	0.278 ±0.021	18.26157 ±0.00006	0.1330 ±0.0009	722 ±23	transit	253.365^{+0.736}_{−0.732}	0.94 ±0.02	5659 ±48	
TOI-2152A b	2.83^{+0.38}_{−0.37}	1.281^{+0.050}_{−0.046}	3.3773512^{+0.0000060}_{−0.0000061}	0.05064^{+0.00093}_{−0.00110}	1802^{+60}_{−54}	transit	988.275^{+10.143}_{−9.945}	1.516^{+0.085}_{−0.100}	6630^{+300}_{−200}	
TOI-2154 b	0.920^{+0.190}_{−0.180}	1.453^{+0.053}_{−0.048}	3.8240801 ±0.0000025	0.0513^{+0.0011}_{−0.0013}	1580 ±27	transit	966.924^{+2.174}_{−2.143}	1.233^{+0.077}_{−0.090}	6280 ±160	
TOI-2194 b	0.0145	0.178^{+0.012}_{−0.006}	15.337597^{+0.001585}_{−0.001616}		590.88	transit	63.84 ±0.12	0.7400 ±0.0854	4756 ±50	
TOI-2338 b	5.98^{+0.21}_{−0.20}	1.00 ±0.02	22.65398 ±0.00002	0.158 ±0.03	799^{+10}_{−11}	transit	1032 ±7	0.99^{+0.03}_{−0.02}	5581 ±60	
TOI-2364 b	0.225^{+0.043}_{−0.049}	0.768^{+0.023}_{−0.018}	4.0197517 ±0.0000043	0.04871^{+0.00069}_{−0.00079}	1091^{+17}_{−14}	transit	716.286^{+5.594}_{−5.509}	0.954^{+0.041}_{−0.046}	5306^{+76}_{−68}	
TOI-2443 b	0.0256	0.248 ±0.004	15.669494^{+0.000926}_{−0.001004}		600.83	transit		0.6600 ±0.0789	4357 ±100	
TOI-2459 b	0.0285	0.264^{+0.008}_{−0.006}	19.104718^{+0.000023}_{−0.000024}		445.01	transit		0.6600 ±0.0763	4195 ±124	
TOI-2497 b	4.82 ±0.41	0.9940^{+0.0550}_{−0.0490}	10.655669 ±0.000038	0.1166 ±0.0018	1595^{+45}_{−42}	transit	930.489^{+11.624}_{−11.347}	1.859^{+0.087}_{−0.083}	7360^{+320}_{−300}	
TOI-2498 b	0.1089^{+0.0129}_{−0.0129}	0.541^{+0.026}_{−0.024}	3.738252 ±0.000004	0.0491 ±0.0030	1443^{+15}_{−28}	transit	897.796^{+13.712}_{−13.314}	1.12 ±0.02	5905 ±12	
TOI-2525 b	0.088^{+0.005}_{−0.004}	0.774 ±0.010	23.288^{+0.001}_{−0.002}	0.1511 ±0.0025	500	transit	1305 ±8	0.849^{+0.024}_{−0.033}	5096 ±80	
TOI-2525 c	0.709 ±0.034	0.904 ±0.010	49.260 ±0.001	0.2491^{+0.0041}_{−0.0042}	390	transit	1305 ±8	0.849^{+0.024}_{−0.033}	5096 ±80	
TOI-2583A b	0.250^{+0.058}_{−0.056}	1.290^{+0.040}_{−0.033}	4.5207265 ±0.0000049	0.0571^{+0.0010}_{−0.0013}	1456^{+19}_{−16}	transit	1846.66^{+21.10}_{−20.64}	1.215^{+0.063}_{−0.082}	5936^{+65}_{−68}	
TOI-2587A b	0.218^{+0.054}_{−0.046}	1.077^{+0.042}_{−0.040}	5.456640 ±0.000011	0.0635^{+0.0025}_{−0.0013}	1445^{+23}_{−26}	transit	1218.77^{+5.953}_{−5.772}	1.15^{+0.14}_{−0.07}	5760^{+80}_{−79}	
TOI-2589 b	3.5 ±0.1	1.08 ±0.03	61.6277 ±0.0002	0.300^{+0.006}_{−0.005}	592^{+7}_{−8}	transit	658 ±3	0.93^{+0.03}_{−0.02}	5579 ±70	
TOI-2641 b	0.367^{+0.049}_{−0.040}	1.615^{+0.462}_{−0.640}	4.880974^{+0.000023}_{−0.000037}	0.0607^{+0.0042}_{−0.0043}	1387^{+22}_{−23}	transit	1131 ±7	1.16 ±0.07	6100 ±100	Extremely grazing transit
TOI-2796 b	0.44^{+0.10}_{−0.11}	>1.54	4.8084983^{+0.0000057}_{−0.0000056}	0.0569^{+0.0010}_{−0.0011}	1205^{+18}_{−17}	transit	1142.67^{+19.63}_{−18.99}	1.063^{+0.057}_{−0.062}	5764^{+81}_{−78}	
TOI-2803A b	0.9750^{+0.0830}_{−0.0700}	1.616^{+0.034}_{−0.032}	1.96229325 ±0.00000082	0.03185 ±0.00052	1893^{+29}_{−28}	transit	1613.88^{+21.68}_{−21.13}	1.118^{+0.056}_{−0.054}	6280^{+99}_{−96}	
TOI-2818 b	0.71 ±0.26	1.363^{+0.046}_{−0.045}	4.0397090^{+0.0000024}_{−0.0000023}	0.0493^{+0.0010}_{−0.0008}	1376^{+26}_{−24}	transit	1019.81^{+7.39}_{−7.28}	0.9770^{+0.0630}_{−0.0490}	5721^{+88}_{−83}	
TOI-2842 b	0.370^{+0.052}_{−0.047}	1.146^{+0.051}_{−0.048}	3.5514058^{+0.0000077}_{−0.0000078}	0.0475^{+0.0010}_{−0.0011}	1471^{+29}_{−27}	transit	1503.57^{+25.18}_{−24.37}	1.135^{+0.077}_{−0.079}	5910 ±100	
TOI-2977 b	1.68^{+0.26}_{−0.25}	1.174^{+0.031}_{−0.027}	2.3505614 ±0.0000025	0.03386^{+0.00067}_{−0.00050}	1544 ±26	transit		0.936^{+0.057}_{−0.041}	5691^{+94}_{−93}	
TOI-3023 b	0.62^{+0.10}_{−0.09}	1.466^{+0.043}_{−0.032}	3.9014971 ±0.0000031	0.0505^{+0.0015}_{−0.0009}	1596^{+24}_{−25}	transit	1271.74^{+10.42}_{−10.26}	1.12^{+0.11}_{−0.06}	5760^{+85}_{−88}	
TOI-3082 b	0.0411	0.327 ±0.013	1.926907^{+0.000128}_{−0.000134}		1032.78	transit	368.8 ±1.5	0.6640 ±0.0798	4263 ±100	
TOI-3235 b	0.665 ±0.025	1.017 ±0.044	2.59261842 ±0.00000041	0.02709 ±0.00046	604 ±19	transit	236.7 ±0.5	0.394 ±0.003	3389 ±6	
TOI-3364 b	1.67^{+0.12}_{−0.13}	1.091^{+0.038}_{−0.032}	5.8768918 ±0.0000069	0.0675^{+0.0011}_{−0.0016}	1264^{+22}_{−21}	transit	906.386^{+8.170}_{−8.027}	1.186^{+0.059}_{−0.083}	5706^{+95}_{−91}	
TOI-3688A b	0.980^{+0.100}_{−0.110}	1.167^{+0.048}_{−0.044}	3.246075 ±0.000012	0.04560^{+0.00089}_{−0.00098}	1534^{+29}_{−28}	transit	1292.81^{+19.67}_{−19.10}	1.199^{+0.072}_{−0.076}	5950 ±100	
TOI-3785 b	0.0470 ±0.0126	0.459 ±0.014	4.6747373 ±0.0000038	0.043 ±0.001	582 ±16	transit	259.0 ±0.3	0.52 ±0.02	3576 ±88	
TOI-3807 b	1.04^{+0.15}_{−0.14}	>1.65	2.8989727^{+0.0000038}_{−0.0000039}	0.0421^{+0.0007}_{−0.0011}	1646^{+25}_{−24}	transit	1375.55^{+15.20}_{−14.88}	1.181^{+0.0064}_{−0.0092}	5772^{+84}_{−80}	
TOI-3819 b	1.11^{+0.18}_{−0.20}	1.172^{+0.036}_{−0.035}	3.2443141 ±0.0000055	0.04611^{+0.00069}_{−0.00096}	1633^{+21}_{−19}	transit	1820.41^{+42.55}_{−40.68}	1.242^{+0.057}_{−0.076}	5859^{+72}_{−71}	
TOI-3912 b	0.406^{+0.071}_{−0.068}	1.274^{+0.041}_{−0.040}	3.4936264 ±0.0000038	0.0463^{+0.0012}_{−0.0010}	1512 ±20	transit	1519.86^{+21.48}_{−20.90}	1.088^{+0.086}_{−0.070}	5725^{+69}_{−68}	
TOI-3976A b	0.175^{+0.037}_{−0.036}	1.095^{+0.036}_{−0.035}	6.607662^{+0.000016}_{−0.000015}	0.0743^{+0.0013}_{−0.0014}	1295^{+16}_{−14}	transit	1683.25^{+19.30}_{−18.88}	1.254^{+0.067}_{−0.072}	5975^{+70}_{−69}	
TOI-3984A b	0.14 ±0.03	0.71 ±0.02	4.35326 ±0.000005	0.041^{+0.002}_{−0.001}	563 ±15	transit	353.6^{+1.0}_{−0.7}	0.49 ±0.02	3476 ±88	
TOI-4010 b	0.03461^{+0.00406}_{−0.00400}	0.269 ±0.007	1.348335^{+0.000003}_{−0.000002}	0.0229 ±0.0002	1441^{+14}_{−13}	transit	578.941^{+3.242}_{−3.203}	0.88 ±0.03	4960 ±36	
TOI-4010 c	0.06390^{+0.00670}_{−0.00664}	0.529^{+0.010}_{−0.011}	5.414654 ±0.000007	0.058 ±0.001	907^{+9}_{−8}	transit	578.941^{+3.242}_{−3.203}	0.88 ±0.03	4960 ±36	
TOI-4010 d	0.1200^{+0.0103}_{−0.0101}	0.551^{+0.012}_{−0.013}	14.70886 ±0.00003	0.113 ±0.001	650 ±6	transit	578.941^{+3.242}_{−3.203}	0.88 ±0.03	4960 ±36	
TOI-4010 e	2.18^{+0.21}_{−0.20}		>762 ±90	1.57^{+0.12}_{−0.13}	174^{+8}_{−6}	radial vel.	578.941^{+3.242}_{−3.203}	0.88 ±0.03	4960 ±36	
TOI-4087 b	0.73 ±0.14	1.164^{+0.025}_{−0.024}	3.17748350 ±0.00000094	0.04469^{+0.00048}_{−0.00054}	1458^{+20}_{−17}	transit	983.937^{+7.257}_{−7.153}	1.178^{+0.039}_{−0.042}	6060^{+74}_{−67}	
TOI-4127 b	2.30 ±0.11	1.096^{+0.039}_{−0.032}	56.39879 ±0.00010	0.3081^{+0.0055}_{−0.0058}	605.1^{+9.6}_{−8.2}	transit	1060 ±20	1.23 ±0.07	6096 ±115	Highly eccentric orbit
TOI-4145A b	0.43 ±0.13	1.187^{+0.032}_{−0.031}	4.0664428 ±0.0000058	0.04823^{+0.00075}_{−0.00079}	1074^{+19}_{−16}	transit	669.884^{+3.904}_{−3.862}	0.905^{+0.043}_{−0.044}	5281^{+86}_{−76}	
TOI-4184 b		0.217 ±0.019	4.9019804 ±0.0000052	0.0336 ±0.0015	412 ±8	transit	226.238^{+1.058}_{−1.049}	0.2109^{+0.0290}_{−0.0260}	3238^{+48}_{−49}	
TOI-4201 b	2.589 ±0.066	1.133 ±0.024	3.5819111 ±1.7e-06	0.03939 ±0.0004	745 ±14	transit	611.54^{+1.96}_{−2.28}	0.63 ±0.02	3920 ±50	
TOI-4308 b	0.0203	0.216 ±0.023	9.151201^{+0.000036}_{−0.000037}		763.05	transit		0.9000 ±0.1133	5243 ±126	
TOI-4342 b	0.16 ±0.16	0.202 ±0.003	5.5382498^{+0.0000057}_{−0.0000058}	0.05251 ±0.00011	633.6^{+6.2}_{−6.3}	transit	200.73	0.6296 ±0.0086	3901 ±69	
TOI-4342 c	0.145 ±0.145	0.215 ±0.004	10.688716 ±0.000015	0.08140 ±0.00017	508.9 ±5.0	transit	200.73	0.6296 ±0.0086	3901 ±69	
TOI-4377 b	0.9570^{+0.0890}_{−0.0870}	1.348 ±0.081	4.378081 ±0.000019	0.0579^{+0.0010}_{−0.0011}	1395^{+25}_{−22}	transit	1486.69^{+16.01}_{−15.68}	1.36^{+0.08}_{−0.07}	4974 ±57	
TOI-4406 b	0.30 ±0.03	1.00 ±0.02	30.08364 ±0.00005	0.201 ±0.005	904^{+16}_{−17}	transit	861 ±7	1.19 ±0.03	6219 ±70	
TOI-4463A b	0.794^{+0.039}_{−0.040}	1.183^{+0.064}_{−0.045}	2.8807198^{+0.0000028}_{−0.0000027}	0.04036^{+0.00074}_{−0.00082}	1395^{+25}_{−22}	transit	564.633^{+4.250}_{−4.191}	1.062^{+0.059}_{−0.063}	5640^{+89}_{−82}	
TOI-4515 b	2.005 ±0.052	1.086 ±0.039	15.266	0.118 ±0.001	705 ±10	transit		0.949 ±0.020	5433 ±70	Highly eccentric orbit (e = 0.46)
TOI-4551 b	1.49 ±0.13	1.058^{+0.110}_{−0.062}	9.955810^{+0.000076}_{−0.000078}	0.09940^{+0.00300}_{−0.00320}		transit	704.453^{+8.033}_{−7.857}	1.31^{+0.07}_{−0.18}	4896 ±110	
TOI-4559 b	0.00849^{+0.00629}_{−0.00315}	0.126^{+0.0112}_{−0.00999}	3.965991^{+0.000314}_{−0.000332}	0.0359 ±0.0008	554.16 ±19.14	transit	90.704 ±0.0978	0.392^{+0.027}_{−0.026}	3558^{+73}_{−83}	
TOI-4562 b	2.30^{+0.48}_{−0.47}	1.118^{+0.014}_{−0.013}	225.11781^{+0.00025}_{−0.00022}	0.768 ±0.005	318 ±4	transit	1107.64^{+8.25}_{−8.12}	1.192 ±0.057	6096 ±32	
TOI-4582 b	0.53 ±0.05	0.940^{+0.090}_{−0.120}	31.034 ±0.001			transit	1251.94^{+11.83}_{−11.62}	1.34 ±0.06	5190 ±100	
TOI-4600 b	~0.0976	0.607^{+0.026}_{−0.028}	82.6869 ±0.0003	0.349 ±0.021	347^{+12}_{−11}	transit	705.97 ±1.68	0.89 ±0.05	5170 ±120	
TOI-4600 c	~0.1510	0.841 ±0.037	482.8191^{+0.0018}_{−0.0017}	1.152 ±0.068	191 ±6	transit	705.97 ±1.68	0.89 ±0.05	5170 ±120	As of August 2023, longest-period confirmed planet discovered by TESS
TOI-4603 b	12.89^{+0.58}_{−0.57}	1.042^{+0.038}_{−0.035}	7.24599^{+0.00022}_{−0.00021}	0.0888 ±0.0010	1677 ±24	transit	731 ±3	1.765 ±0.061	6264^{+95}_{−94}	Metal enriched gas giant
TOI-4791 b	2.31^{+0.32}_{−0.33}	1.110 ±0.050	4.280880^{+0.000022}_{−0.000023}	0.0555^{+0.0011}_{−0.0012}	1472^{+26}_{−24}	transit	1072.41^{+12.05}_{−11.79}	1.242^{+0.072}_{−0.077}	6058^{+99}_{−94}	
TOI-4860 b	0.67 ±0.14	0.756 ±0.024	1.52275959^{+0.00000032}_{−0.00000035}	0.01845 ±0.00059	624 ±30	transit	261.390^{+2.114}_{−2.081}	0.3357 ±0.0081	3390 ±120	
TOI-5126 b		0.423^{+0.014}_{−0.012}	5.4588385^{+0.0000070}_{−0.0000072}	0.06519^{+0.00087}_{−0.00082}	1442^{+46}_{−40}	transit	523.201^{+5.264}_{−5.160}	1.240^{+0.050}_{−0.046}	6150^{+110}_{−130}	
TOI-5126 c		0.344^{+0.015}_{−0.014}	17.8999^{+0.0018}_{−0.0013}	0.1439^{+0.0019}_{−0.0018}	971.0^{+31.0}_{−27.0}	transit	523.201^{+5.264}_{−5.160}	1.240^{+0.050}_{−0.046}	6150^{+110}_{−130}	
TOI-5205 b	1.08 ±0.06	1.03 ±0.03	1.630757 ±0.000001	0.0199 ±0.0002		transit	281.960^{+1.363}_{−1.350}	0.394 ±0.011	3430 ±54	
TOI-5293A b	0.54 ±0.07	1.06 ±0.04	2.930289 ±0.000004	0.034^{+0.004}_{−0.003}	675^{+42}_{−30}	transit	525 ±2	0.54 ±0.02	3586 ±88	
TOI-5344 b	0.412 ±0.040	0.946 ±0.021	3.7926220 ±0.0000062	0.04041 ±0.00075	689 ±12	transit	451.293^{+4.357}_{−4.276}	0.612 ±0.034	3747 ±64	
TOI-5398 c	0.0371^{+0.0151}_{−0.0148}	0.314 ±0.017	4.77271^{+0.00016}_{−0.00014}	0.057 ±0.003	1242 ±37	transit	426.792^{+2.237}_{−2.211}	1.146 ±0.013	6000 ±75	
TOI-5678 b	0.063 ±0.013	0.438 ±0.007	47.73022^{+0.00014}_{−0.00013}	0.249 ±0.005	513^{+8}_{−7}	transit	539.441^{+2.293}_{−2.277}	0.905^{+0.039}_{−0.041}	5485 ±63	
TOI-5704 b		0.288	3.7711160^{+0.0000115}_{−0.0000107}		949.07	transit	292.357^{+0.881}_{−0.876}	0.7575 ±0.0593	4590 ±126	
TOI-5799 b	0.0116^{+0.00849}_{−0.00440}	0.145^{+0.0171}_{−0.0114}	4.164753^{+0.00038}_{−0.000427}	0.0352 ±0.0011	518.01 ±20.15	transit	90.704 ±0.0978	0.337^{+0.027}_{−0.032}	3514^{+95}_{−94}	
TOI-5803 b	0.0339	0.292 ±0.011	5.383050^{+0.000207}_{−0.000200}		678.87	transit		0.8700 ±0.1032	5134 ±121	
WASP-84 c	0.048^{+0.014}_{−0.013}	0.174 ±0.011	1.4468849^{+0.0000022}_{−0.0000016}	0.02359 ±0.00100	1329^{+31}_{−30}	transit	328.075^{+1.595}_{−1.579}	0.853 ±0.038		
WASP-193 b	0.139 ±0.029	1.464^{+0.059}_{−0.057}	6.2463345 ±0.0000003	0.0676 ±0.0015	1254 ±31	transit	1180.97^{+17.56}_{−17.06}	1.059^{+0.067}_{−0.068}	6078 ±120	
WISE J033605.05-014350.4 b	8.25 ±4.25		2560 ±730	0.970 ±0.050	325^{+15}_{−10}	imaging	32.7 ± 0.7 (Note: Distance calculated from the given parallax of 99.8 milliarcseconds.)	0.01310 ±0.00597	415 ±20	
Wolf 1069 b	0.003963425 ±0.0006605		15.564 ±0.015	0.0672 ±0.0014	250.0 ±6.6	radial vel.	31.228	0.167 ±0.011	3158 ±54	Habitable zone planet

== Specific exoplanet lists ==
Lists of exoplanets

- List of directly imaged exoplanets
- List of exoplanet extremes
- List of exoplanet firsts
- List of exoplanets discovered by the Kepler space telescope
- List of exoplanets observed during Kepler's K2 mission
- List of exoplanets discovered by the TESS mission
- List of terrestrial exoplanet candidates for atmosphere detection
- List of hottest exoplanets
- List of coldest exoplanets
- List of multiplanetary systems
- List of circumbinary planets
- List of nearest exoplanets
- List of nearest terrestrial exoplanet candidates
- List of potentially habitable exoplanets
- List of proper names of exoplanets
- List of largest exoplanets
- List of smallest exoplanets
- List of transiting exoplanets
- List of exoplanets and planetary debris around giant stars
- List of exoplanets and planetary debris around white dwarfs
- List of extrasolar planetary collisions

=== Lists of exoplanets by year of discovery ===
- List of exoplanets discovered before 2000 (31)
- List of exoplanets discovered between 2000–2009 (376)
- List of exoplanets discovered in 2010 (109)
- List of exoplanets discovered in 2011 (178)
- List of exoplanets discovered in 2012 (147)
- List of exoplanets discovered in 2013 (149)
- List of exoplanets discovered in 2014 (869)
- List of exoplanets discovered in 2015 (144)
- List of exoplanets discovered in 2016 (1497)
- List of exoplanets discovered in 2017 (152)
- List of exoplanets discovered in 2018 (300)
- List of exoplanets discovered in 2019 (169)
- List of exoplanets discovered in 2020 (256)
- List of exoplanets discovered in 2021 (253)
- List of exoplanets discovered in 2022 (312)
- List of exoplanets discovered in 2023 (304)
- List of exoplanets discovered in 2024 (284)
- List of exoplanets discovered in 2025 (239)
- List of exoplanets discovered in 2026 (351)
