= HD 18438 =

M-type giant star in constellation Cepheus

- Location of HD 18438 (circled)

Observation data Epoch J2000.0 Equinox ICRS
- Constellation: Cepheus
- HD 18438
- Right ascension: 03^{h} 06^{m} 07.84053^{s}
- Declination: +79° 25′ 06.7270″
- Apparent magnitude (V): +5.49
- TYC 4516-2148-1
- Right ascension: 03^{h} 06^{m} 06.49835^{s}
- Declination: +79° 25′ 03.7722″
- Apparent magnitude (V): +9.08

Characteristics

HD 18438
- Evolutionary stage: AGB
- Spectral type: M2.5 III
- B−V color index: +1.569
- Variable type: suspected

TYC 4516-2148-1
- Evolutionary stage: subgiant
- Spectral type: F7 IV
- B−V color index: +0.61

Astrometry

HD 18438
Radial velocity (R_{v})	−37.6 km/s
Proper motion (μ)	RA: −35.523 mas/yr Dec.: +10.383 mas/yr
Parallax (π)	4.2470±0.0776 mas
Distance	770 ± 10 ly (235 ± 4 pc)
Absolute magnitude (M_{V})	-1.0

TYC 4516-2148-1
Proper motion (μ)	RA: −35.639 mas/yr Dec.: +10.069 mas/yr
Parallax (π)	4.3427±0.0176 mas
Distance	751 ± 3 ly (230.3 ± 0.9 pc)
Absolute magnitude (M_{V})	2.5

Orbit
Primary	HD 18438
Name	TYC 4516-2148-1
Semi-major axis (a)	4.7" (1100 AU)

Details

HD 18438
Mass	1.84±0.09 M_{☉}
Radius	88.475±4.424 R_{☉}
Luminosity	929±41 L_{☉}
Surface gravity (log g)	0.9±0.1 cgs
Temperature	3860±100 K
Metallicity [Fe/H]	−0.4±0.1 dex
Rotation	637 d
Rotational velocity (v sin i)	5.5±0.2 km/s
Age	5.5±2.4 Gyr

TYC 4516-2148-1
Mass	1.174±0.184 M_{☉}
Radius	2.554±0.182 R_{☉}
Luminosity	7.558±0.095 L_{☉}
Surface gravity (log g)	3.7±0.1 cgs
Temperature	6164±211 K

Other designations
- ADS 2294, CCDM J03061+7925, WDS J03061+7925
- HD 18438: AG+79°95, BD+78°103, FK5 105, GC 3638, HD 18438, HIP 14417, HR 881, SAO 4810, PPM 5183, TIC 297820335, TYC 4516-2147-1, 2MASS J03060788+7925066
- TYC 4516-2148-1: TYC 4516-2148-1

Database references
SIMBAD	HD 18438
- TYC 4516-2148-1

HD 18438 is a red giant star in the deep northern constellation of Cepheus, located about 730 light-years (220 parsecs) from Earth. With an apparent magnitude of 5.49, it is visible by the naked eye under dark skies as a red-hued dot of light about 10 degrees away from the celestial north pole. It is part of a wide binary system with an F-type subgiant star. In 2023, HD 18438 was discovered to be orbited by a 21 M_{J} substellar object, potentially making it the largest host star to an exoplanet ever found as of September 2024.

== Stellar characteristics ==
HD 18438 is a red giant on the asymptotic giant branch (AGB) that has already gone through the helium shell flash, with a spectral type of M2.5 III. Thus, it has evolved past the main sequence after using up its core hydrogen. It has 1.84 times the mass of the Sun but 88.48 times its girth and, at an effective temperature of 3,860 K (3,590 °C; 6,490 °F) it radiates 929 times Sun's luminosity from its photosphere. The star is aged 5.5±2.4 billion years, making it likely older than the Solar System. It has a low metallicity of −0.4±0.1 dex, which translates to an iron abundance 32–50% that of the Sun.

It is the largest host star to a confirmed exoplanet included in the NASA Exoplanet Archive as of September 2024. However, some definitions may classify the planet as a brown dwarf instead due to its high mass.

Much like many AGB stars, HD 18438 is suspected to be a variable star, its apparent magnitude fluctuating between 5.43 and 5.49.

== Binary system ==
The star has been noted to be part of a double star since at least 1932, receiving the designation ADS 2294 in the Aitken Double Star Catalogue, with a 9th-magnitude F7IV star later designated TYC 4516-2148-1. Due to its similarities to HD 18438 in distance and proper motion, this star is thought to be a physical binary companion to HD 18438. Located at a wide separation of 1,100 AU from the primary star, TYC 4516-2148-1 is slightly more massive than the Sun, but is 2.5 times larger and 7.5 times as luminous. The star is similar to HD 18438 in that it is somewhat more massive than the Sun and is past the main-sequence stage, but its relationship with HD 18438 is poorly understood.

== Substellar companion ==
In 2023, a team of South Korean astronomers reported the discovery of a substellar object, named HD 18438 b, which could either be described as a massive gas giant exoplanet or a low-mass brown dwarf. It is about 8% larger than the planet Jupiter and at least 21 times as massive, which places it above the deuterium burning limit (~13 M_{J}). It revolves around the star in a roughly circular (eccentricity 0.1) orbit with a semi-major axis of 2.1 AU (310,000,000 km) once every 803 days (2.20 years).

The HD 18438 planetary system
Companion (in order from star)	Mass	Semimajor axis (AU)	Orbital period (days)	Eccentricity	Inclination (°)	Radius
b	≥21±1 M_{J}	2.1±0.1	803±5	0.1±0.1	—	~1.08 R_{J}

== See also ==
- HD 208527: Another M-type giant with a gas giant exoplanet.
- HD 220074: Same as above.
