= HD 72659 b =

Extrasolar planet

Discovery
- Discovered by: Butler, Marcy, Vogt, and Fischer
- Discovery site: Keck Observatory, Hawaii, United States
- Discovery date: 13 June 2002
- Detection method: Doppler spectroscopy

Orbital characteristics
- Semi-major axis: 4.691+0.185 −0.202 AU
- Eccentricity: 0.257+0.014 −0.016
- Orbital period (sidereal): 9.718+0.052 −0.043 yr
- Inclination: 77.583°+39.898° −39.755°
- Longitude of ascending node: 204.866°+69.102° −68.721°
- Time of periastron: 2448147.062+43.195 −47.937
- Argument of periastron: 259.451°+3.318° −3.560°
- Semi-amplitude: 37.908+0.613 −0.551 m/s
- Star: HD 72659

Physical characteristics
- Mass: 2.988+2.586 −0.098 M_{J}

HD 72659 b is a superjovian exoplanet massing at least 3.3 M_{J} orbiting at 4.77 AU from the star, taking 3630 days to complete one orbit. The orbital distance range from 3.49 AU to 6.05 AU with orbital eccentricity of 0.269. In 2022, the inclination and true mass of HD 72659 b were measured via astrometry.

== See also ==
- HD 73256
