= TOI-4127 b =

Gas giant exoplanet orbiting TOI-4127

Discovery
- Discovered by: TESS
- Discovery date: 2023
- Detection method: Transit

Orbital characteristics
- Eccentricity: 0.75
- Inclination: 89.3

Physical characteristics
- Mean radius: 1.096 R_{J}
- Mass: 2.3 M_{J}

TOI-4127 b is a confirmed gas giant type exoplanet orbiting the faint F-type main-sequence star TOI-4127, about 1,042 light years away from earth. The planet is known as a warm Jupiter, a type of gas giant exoplanet that is not a hot Jupiter but is also not a cold Jupiter.

== Physical characteristics ==
This planet has a mass of 2.3 M_{J} and a radius of 1.096 R_{J}.

== Orbital characteristics ==
TOI-4127 b orbits TOI-4127 at a distance of 0.3081 astronomical units (AU) and an orbital eccentricity of 0.75. The planet takes 56.4 days to orbit its parent star. Its orbit lies at an orbital inclination of 89.3°. The exoplanet orbits its parent star at a high eccentricity making it also a eccentric Jupiter.
