= TOI-672 b =

Neptune-like exoplanet

Discovery
- Discovery date: 2023
- Detection method: Transit

Orbital characteristics
- Eccentricity: 0.0
- Orbital period (sidereal): 3.6 days
- Inclination: 88.43±0.82 Degree (angle)
- Star: TOI-672

Physical characteristics
- Mean radius: 0.470+0.008 −0.009 R_{J}
- Mass: 0.0760 M_{J}
- Temperature: 676.15 K

TOI-672 b is a Neptune-like exoplanet, located 218 light-years away. The exoplanet was discovered in the year 2023.

== Characteristics ==
=== Mass and radius ===
TOI-672 b was discovered by the transit method. Its mass is 0.0760 M_{J} or 24.1 M_{🜨}. The exoplanet currently has a radius of 0.470+0.008
−0.009 R_{J} or 5.26+0.08
−0.10 R_{🜨}.

=== Orbit ===
TOI-672 b has a smaller orbital period than Mercury. The exoplanet has an orbital period of 3.6 days, just like Kepler-444 b and has an inclination of 8.43±0.82 Degree (angle).

== Host star ==
The host star of the exoplanet is TOI-672.

The host star is a M-type star and is not visible to the naked eye from Earth. The star has a mass of 0.54±0.02 M_{☉}, a radius of 0.544±0.0163 R_{☉} and a temperature of 3765±65 Kelvin.

== See also ==
- List of exoplanets
- List of exoplanets discovered in 2023
- Astronomical transit
