= K2-415b =

Earth-sized exoplanet

Discovery
- Discovered by: TESS, Kepler Space Telescope
- Discovery date: 2023
- Detection method: Transit

Orbital characteristics
- Semi-major axis: 0.027 AU
- Eccentricity: 0
- Orbital period (sidereal): 4 d
- Star: K2-415

Physical characteristics
- Mean radius: 1.015 R_{🜨}
- Mass: < 7.5 M_{🜨}

K2-415b is an Earth-sized exoplanet located 72 light-years from Earth orbiting the red dwarf star K2-415.

== Background ==
The planet was found using data from the NASA Kepler Space Telescope, K2, and the Transiting Exoplanet Survey Satellite. K2-415b was discovered in February 2023.

K2-415b is approximately 1.015 times the radius of Earth and is less than 7.5 times the mass of Earth. It does not orbit its star within its proposed habitable zone and orbits at a distance of around 0.027 AU and completes one orbit around its star every 4.018 days; because of this, the average surface temperature of K2-415b is estimated to be 400 K (260 °F; 127 °C).

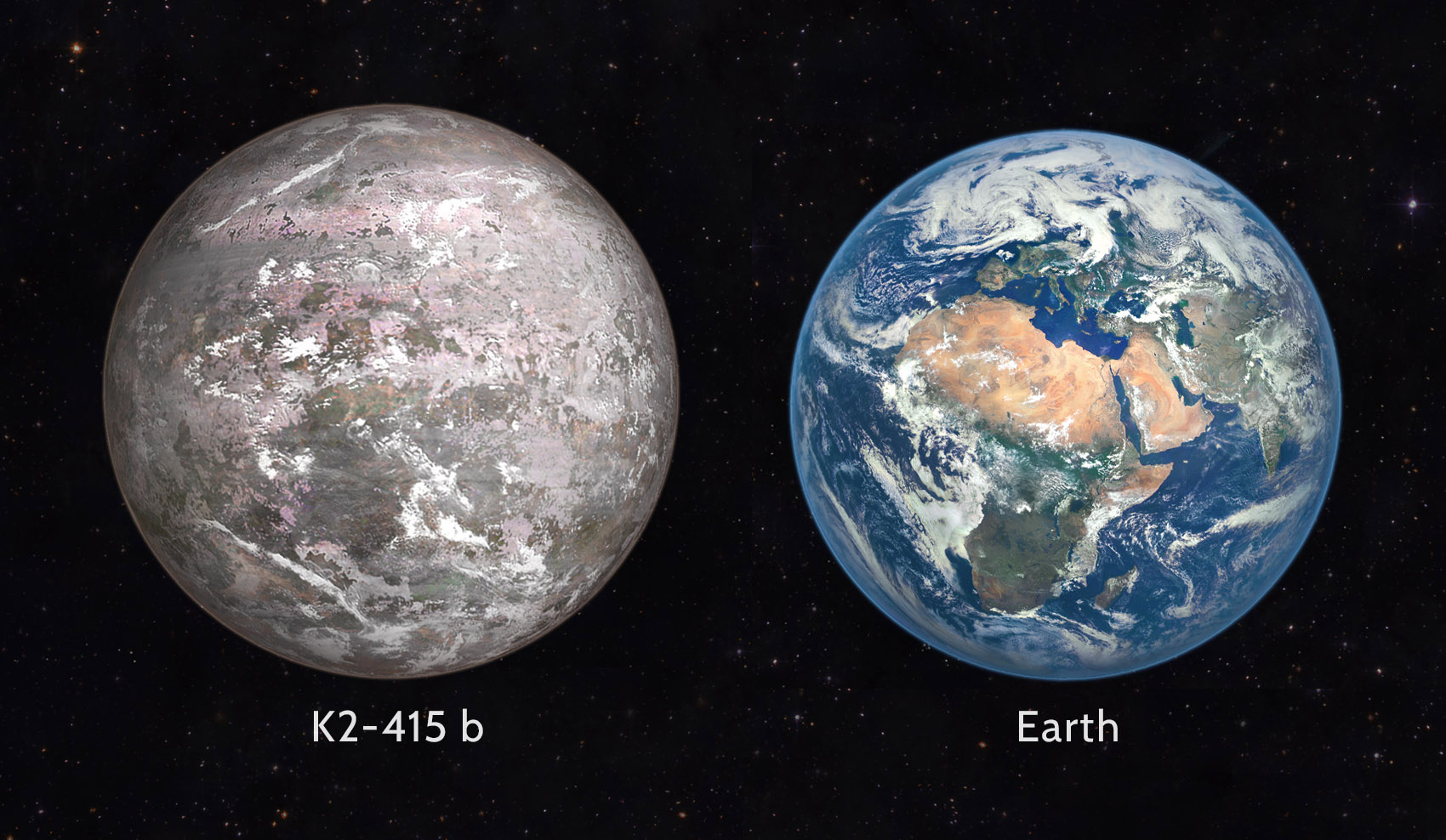
Size comparison of the planet K2-415b (artistic concept) with Earth

== See also ==
- List of exoplanets
- List of exoplanets discovered in 2023
