= Gliese 521 =

Double star in constellation Canes Venatici

Observation data Epoch J2000 Equinox ICRS
- Constellation: Canes Venatici
- Right ascension: 13^{h} 39^{m} 24.10228^{s}
- Declination: +46° 11′ 11.3631″
- Apparent magnitude (V): +10.26

Characteristics
- Evolutionary stage: main sequence
- Spectral type: M1V
- Apparent magnitude (J): 7.05
- Apparent magnitude (H): 6.51
- Apparent magnitude (K): 6.26

Astrometry
Radial velocity (R_{v})	−65.72±0.15 km/s
Proper motion (μ)	RA: −42.332±0.012 mas/yr Dec.: 389.167±0.014 mas/yr
Parallax (π)	74.7985±0.0153 mas
Distance	43.605 ± 0.009 ly (13.369 ± 0.003 pc)
Absolute magnitude (M_{V})	10.243

Details
Mass	0.506±0.021 M_{☉} 0.47±0.05 M_{☉}
Radius	0.619±0.030 R_{☉} 0.47±0.05 R_{☉}
Luminosity	0.033+0.008 −0.007 L_{☉}
Surface gravity (log g)	4.79±0.04 cgs
Temperature	3,493±50 K
Metallicity [Fe/H]	−0.34 dex −0.09±0.09 dex
Rotation	49.5±3.5 d
Rotational velocity (v sin i)	0.85 km/s

Other designations
- BD+46 1889, GJ 521, HIP 66625, SAO 44697, WDS 13394+4611, LTT 13979, TYC 3463-00063-1, 2MASS J13392410+4611114

Database references
SIMBAD	data

Gliese 521 is a double star in the northern constellation of Canes Venatici. The system is located at a distance of 43.6 light-years from the Sun based on parallax measurements, but is drawing closer with a radial velocity of −65.6 km/s. It is predicted to come as close as 15.70 light-years from the Sun in 176,900 years. This star is too faint to be visible to the naked eye, having an apparent visual magnitude of +10.26 and an absolute magnitude of 10.24.

The primary is an M-type main-sequence star with a stellar classification of M1V. It is only about half the size and mass of the Sun. The star is rotating slowly with a projected rotational velocity of 0.85 km/s and a rotation period of roughly 49.5 days. The star has a lower metal-content compared to the Sun. It is radiating just 3% of the luminosity of the Sun from its photosphere at an effective temperature of 3,493 K.

A faint stellar companion was announced by E. Jódar and associates in 2013. The companion has an angular separation of 521 mas along a position angle of 352.1°±1.4° from the primary. This is equivalent to a projected separation of 7.24±0.14 AU.

== Search for planets ==
According to Marcy & Benitz (1989) detected a possible periodicity of 510 days, inferring the possible presence of a massive planetary object with minimum mass of 12 times that of Jupiter in highly eccentric orbit (e=0.6). So far the planet has not been confirmed. A radial velocity study of the star during the period 2013–2017 initially found a promising signal, but this disappeared when additional data was collected and was instead attributed to magnetic activity.

== See also ==
- Gliese 806
