= HD 72659 =

Star in the constellation of Hydra

Observation data Epoch J2000.0 Equinox ICRS
- Constellation: Hydra
- Right ascension: 08^{h} 34^{m} 03.18984^{s}
- Declination: −01° 34′ 05.5822″
- Apparent magnitude (V): 7.46

Characteristics
- Evolutionary stage: subgiant
- Spectral type: G2V
- B−V color index: +0.612±0.015

Astrometry
Radial velocity (R_{v})	−18.203+0.024 −0.029 km/s
Proper motion (μ)	RA: −112.313(26) mas/yr Dec.: −96.386(18) mas/yr
Parallax (π)	19.2582±0.0271 mas
Distance	169.4 ± 0.2 ly (51.93 ± 0.07 pc)
Absolute magnitude (M_{V})	3.98

Details
Mass	1.033±0.025 M_{☉}
Radius	1.36±0.06 R_{☉}
Luminosity	2.16±0.01 L_{☉}
Surface gravity (log g)	4.19±0.02 cgs
Temperature	5,929±61 K
Metallicity [Fe/H]	−0.02±0.06 dex
Rotational velocity (v sin i)	1.6±0.9 km/s
Age	8±1 Gyr

Other designations
- BD−01°2075, HD 72659, HIP 42030, SAO 136045, 2MASS J08340320-0134056, Gaia DR2 3073443760538892032

Database references
SIMBAD	data
Exoplanet Archive	data

HD 72659 is a star in the equatorial constellation of Hydra. With an apparent visual magnitude of 7.46, its yellow-hued star is too faint to be viewed with the naked eye. Parallax measurements provide a distance estimate of 169.4 light years from the Sun, and it has an absolute magnitude of 3.98. The star is drifting closer with a radial velocity of −18.2 km/s.

This is a Sun-like main sequence star with a stellar classification of G2V, indicating that it is generating energy through core hydrogen fusion. It is older than the Sun with an age of about seven billion years, and is spinning with a projected rotational velocity of 5.1 km/s. The star has 7% greater mass than the Sun and a 38% larger radius. It is radiating more than double the Sun's luminosity from its photosphere at an effective temperature of 5,956 K. The metallicity of the stellar atmosphere is similar to the Sun.

== Planetary system ==
An extrasolar planet was discovered orbiting this star in 2003 via the Doppler method. This is a superjovian planet with an eccentric orbit, completing a lap around its host star every 9.9 years. In 2022, the inclination and true mass of HD 72659 b were measured via astrometry, along with the detection of a second substellar companion, likely a brown dwarf. The orbit of the brown dwarf lies in the so-called brown dwarf desert, regions with a deficit of brown dwarfs. The host star is very old and thus HD 72659 b and c can not be directly imaged, even with the most modern equipment such as the James Webb Space Telescope. The moderate eccentricity of planet b may be the result of Kozai-Lidov oscillations.

The HD 72659 planetary system
Companion (in order from star)	Mass	Semimajor axis (AU)	Orbital period (years)	Eccentricity	Inclination (°)	Radius
b	3.0+2.6 −0.1 M_{J}	4.607±0.039	9.72±0.03	0.239±0.001	78±40	—
c	19.4+0.8 −0.5 M_{J}	21.5+0.5 −0.4	97.1+3.4 −2.5	0.114+0.002 −0.003	40±2	—

== See also ==
- HD 73256
- List of extrasolar planets
