= Jupiter analogue =

Exoplanets similar to Jupiter

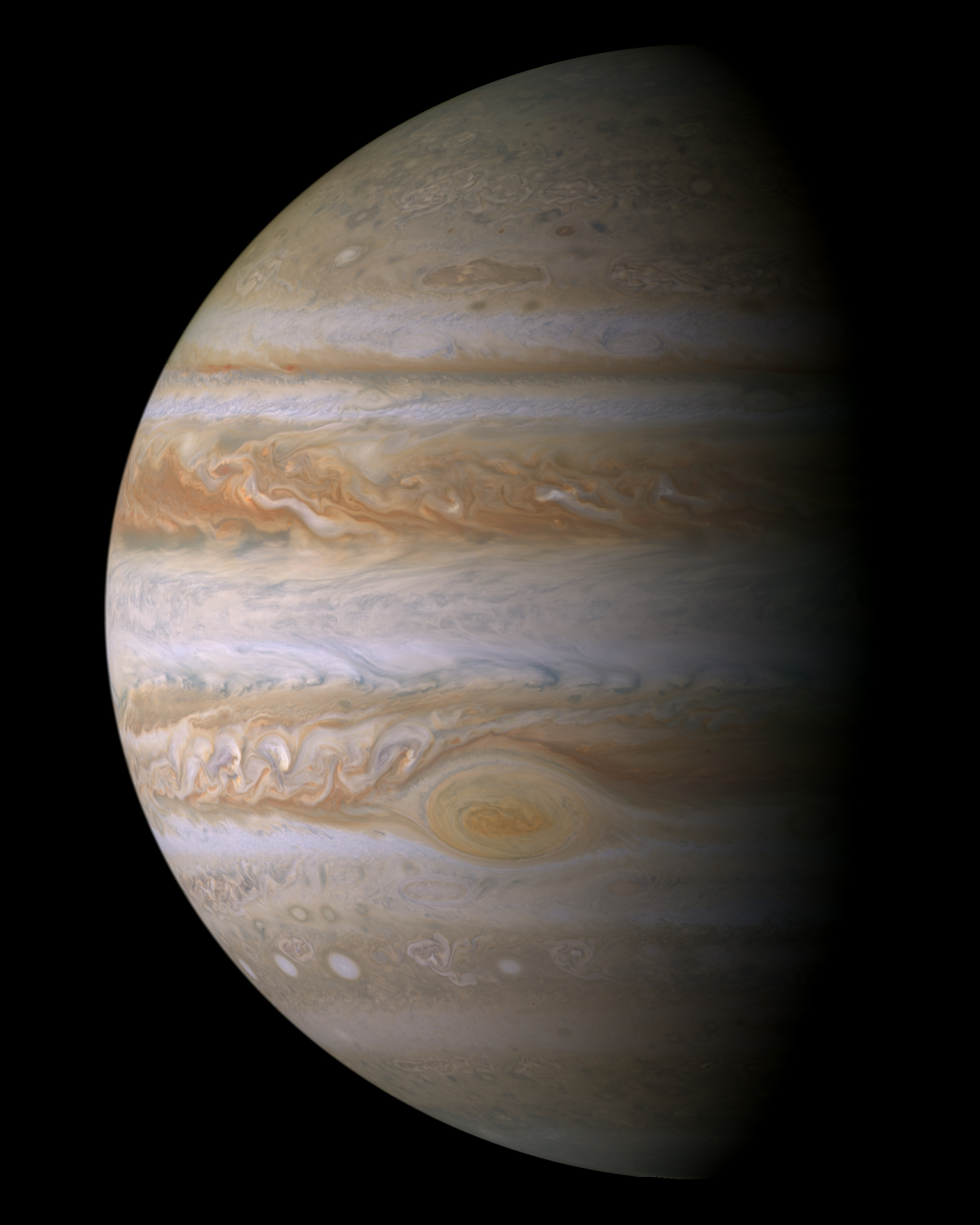
Jupiter is a gas giant. It is the fifth and largest planet in the Solar System.

Jupiter analogues, also known as Jupiter-like planets, are exoplanets that are similar to Jupiter, the largest planet in the Solar System. They are also known as cold jupiters, to distinguish them from hot jupiters or warm jupiters.

A Jupiter-like exoplanet can be defined as having >1 Jupiter mass and orbits its host star at a distance 3 to 12 astronomical units (AU), roughly one to a few times that of the system's snow line. Other definitions use a lower mass limit of >0.3 Jupiter masses, to include planets like Saturn.

== Formation and evolution ==
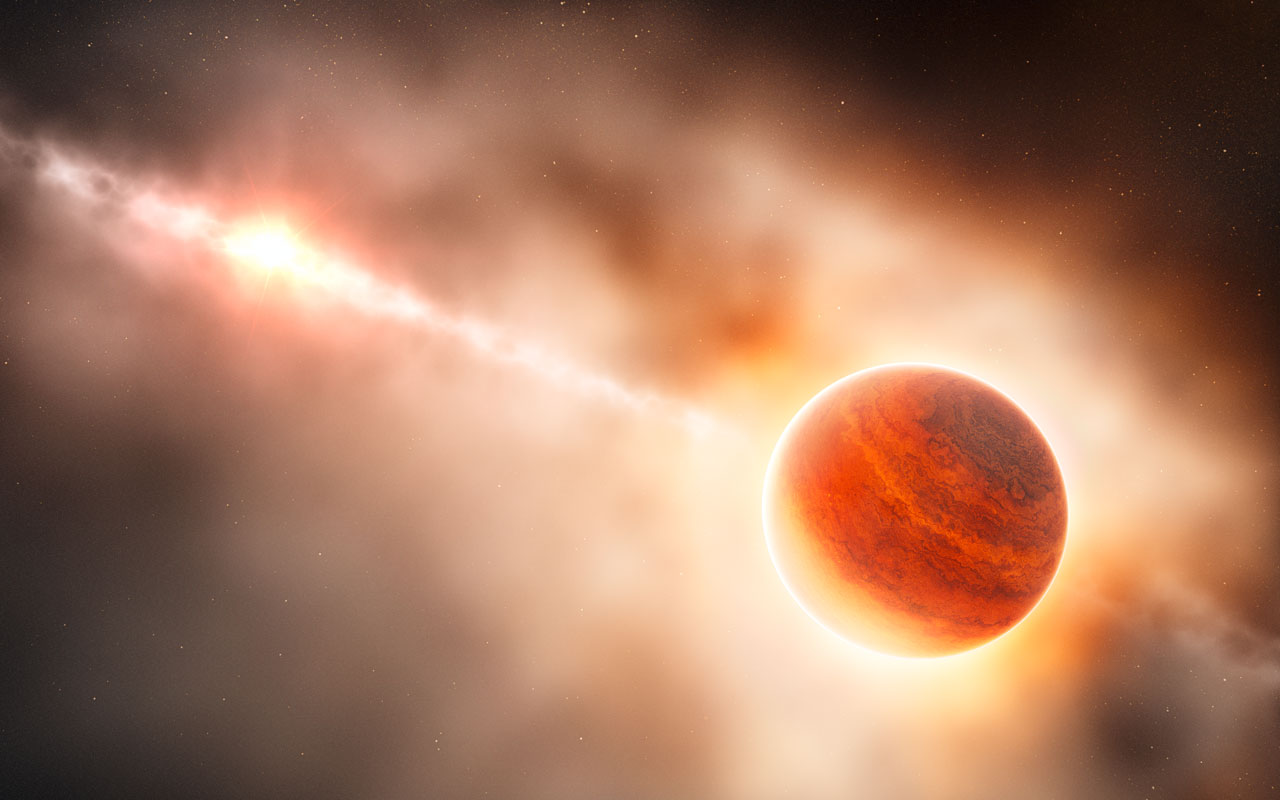
Artistic rendering of a young gas giant planet HD 100546.

While the exact formation of Jupiter-like exoplanets are not known, models of gas giant planet formation predict that Jupiter-like planets should easily form around stars similar to the Sun through core-accretion mechanisms. This therefore should make planets similar to Jupiter a common occurrence in the universe with roughly 6–20% of Sun-like stars having Jupiter-like planets. But this number varies from low rates like 6.9% to higher rates like 25%. It has been found that Jupiter analogues are very rare in mid to late type M-dwarf stars with 0.1–0.3 solar masses. There has been some detections of Jupiter-like planets around red dwarf stars such as TOI-4860b with 0.67 Jupiter masses. The time it takes for form Jupiter-like planets is typically 3–5 million years but some estimates place the formation of Jupiter-like exoplanets to around 1–2 million years.

=== Effect on their systems ===
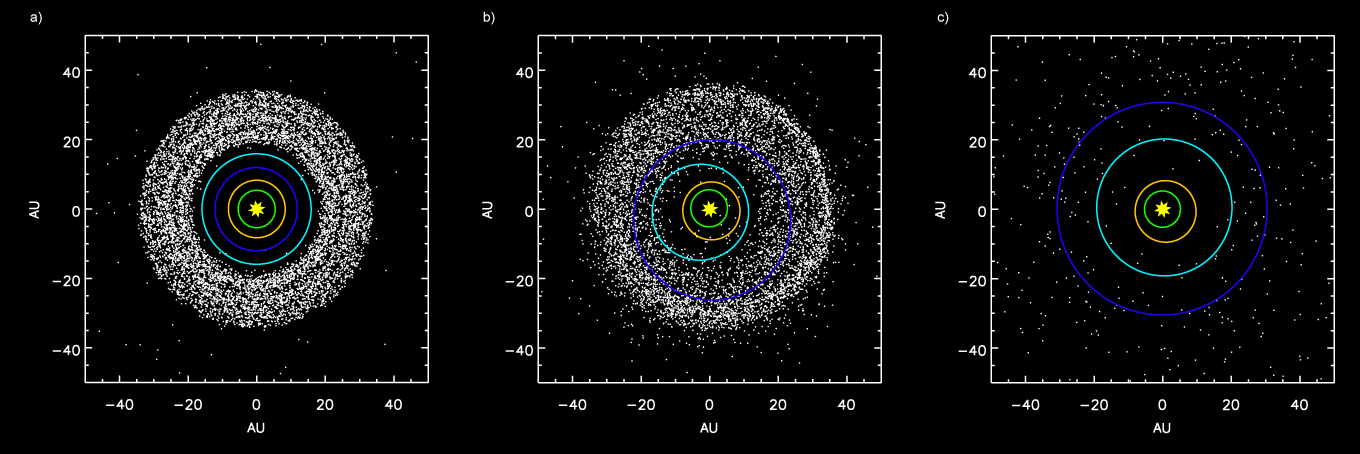
A simulation model of the Nice model of Solar System evolution. It involves the rapid migration of the gas giants and the ice giant planets. This had profound effect on the structure of the modern Solar System.

Jupiter has played a major role in the evolution of the Solar System, determining much of its structure and the configuration of Solar System bodies. It is likely that Jupiter-like exoplanets play a similar role in their systems.

== Examples ==
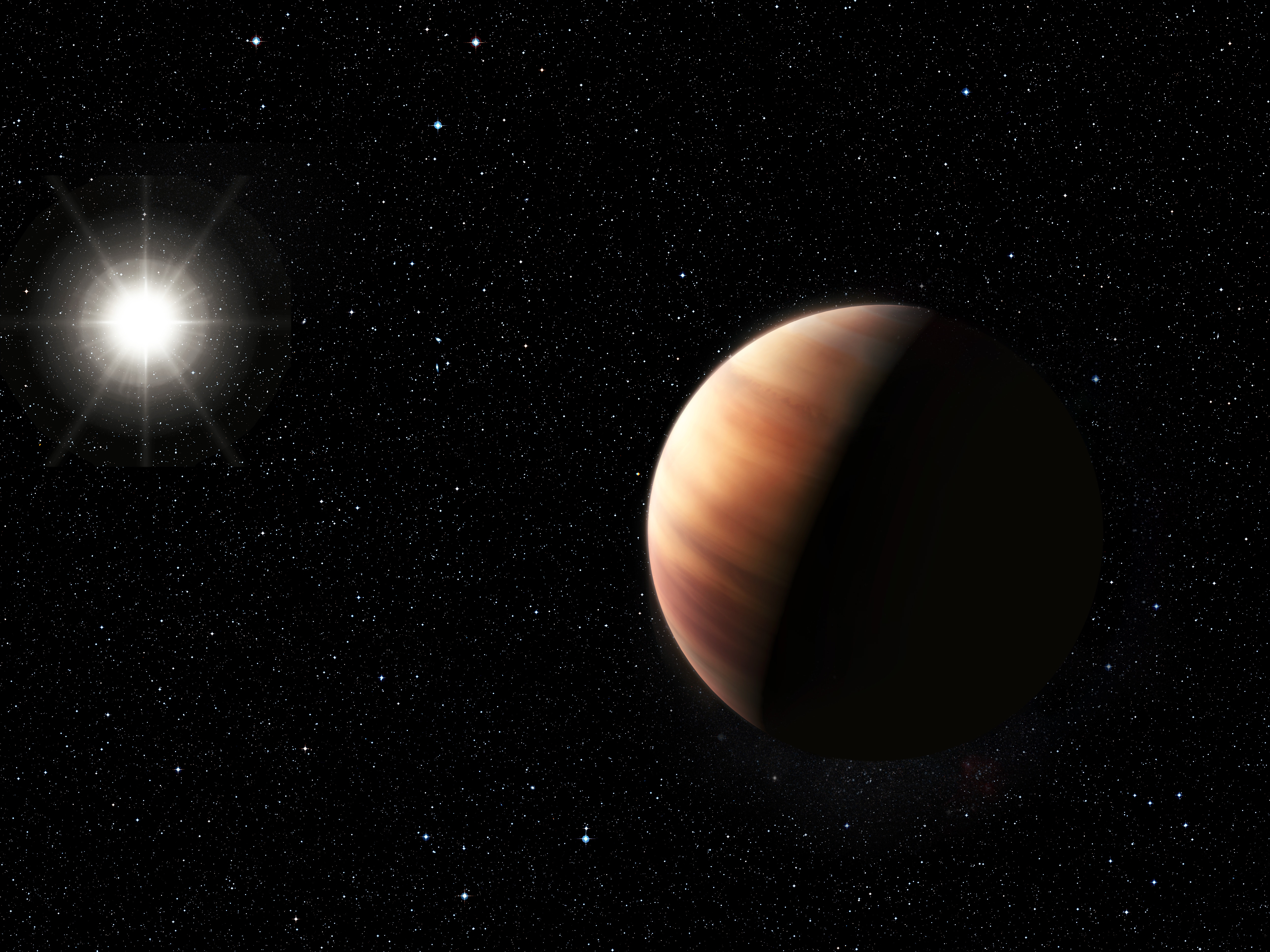
An artistic rendering of HIP 11915, a Jupiter analogue.

With their common occurrence and their increased chance of detection, there are many exoplanets discovered that have been classed as Jupiter analogues.

The nearby exoplanet Epsilon Eridani b, 10.5 light-years away, has been described as "a remarkably close analog to our own planet Jupiter" and "one of the closest analogs to a Solar System planet yet detected around a nearby star". Kepler-167e is an exoplanet orbiting the K-type main sequence star Kepler-167. Its mass and radius is very similar to Jupiter with about 1 Jupiter mass and 0.9 Jupiter radii. Around the young F-type main sequence star 51 Eridani, there is a Jupiter-like planet named 51 Eridani b. This exoplanet has been directly imaged.
