= KMT-2022-BLG-0440L b =

Neptune-like exoplanet

KMT-2022 BLG-0440L b
Discovery
- Discovery date: 2023
- Detection method: Microlensing

Orbital characteristics
- Semi-major axis: 1.9±0.7 AU
- Orbital period (sidereal): 3.6 yrs
- Star: KMT-2022-BLG-0440L

Physical characteristics
- Mass: 0.0485+0.0302 −0.0223 M_{J}

KMT-2022-BLG-0440L b is a Neptune-like exoplanet, located 11,415 light years away in the constellation of Sagittarius. It was discovered in 2023.

== Characteristics ==
=== Mass and radius ===
KMT-2002-BLG-0440L b was discovered by the gravitational microlensing method. This exoplanet's mass is 0.0485+0.302
−0.0223 M_{J} or 15.4 Earth mass. The exoplanet has a planet radius of 0.361 times that of Jupiter and its orbital radius is 1.9 AU.

=== Orbit ===
KMT-2022-BLG-0440L b has a longer orbital period than Earth. The exoplanet has an orbital period of 3.6 years, just like KIC 5951458 b. KMT-2022-BLG-0440L b has a semi-major axis of 1.9±0.7 AU.

== Host star ==
The host star of KMT-2022-BLG-0440L b is KMT-2022-BLG-0440L.

The star type is currently unknown and is not visible with the unaided eye from Earth. The star has a stellar mass of 0.5300 and has 0.53+31
−26 M_{☉}.

== See also ==
- List of exoplanets
- List of exoplanets discovered in 2023
- Gravitational microlensing
