= TOI-3235 b =

Neptune-like planet

Discovery
- Discovered by: Hobson et al.
- Discovery date: 2023
- Detection method: Transit

Orbital characteristics
- Semi-major axis: 0.02709±0.00046 AU
- Eccentricity: 0.029+0.0 −0.29
- Orbital period (sidereal): 2.6 days
- Inclination: 88.14±0.046°
- Star: TOI-3235

Physical characteristics
- Mean radius: 1.017±0.04 R_{J}
- Mass: 0.665±0.025 M_{J}
- Temperature: 604±19 K

TOI-3235 b is a gas giant exoplanet found 237 light-years away from Earth. It was discovered in 2023 by the transit method. It orbits close to its star, which is a red dwarf and located in the constellation of Centaurus. It is also a potential target for future atmospheric observations.

== Characteristics ==
=== Mass and radius ===
TOI-3235 b was discovered by the transit method. The exoplanet's mass is 0.665±0.025 M_{J} and has a radius of 1.017±0.04 M_{J}. Its semi-major axis is 0.02709±0.00046 AU and has a temperature of 604±19 Kelvin.

=== Orbit ===
TOI-3235 b has a smaller orbit than Mercury. The exoplanet's orbit is 2.6 days, which is similar to the orbital period of Gliese 436 b and has an inclination of 88.14±0.046 degrees.

== Host star ==
The host star of the exoplanet is TOI-3235, a M-type main sequence star (red dwarf) that is not visible to the naked eye from Earth with an apparent magnitude of 14.5. The star has a mass of 0.394±0.003 M_{☉}, a radius of 0.3697±0.0018 R_{☉} and a temperature of 3388±68 Kelvin. It is located 237 light-years away in the constellation Centaurus.

== See also ==
- List of exoplanets
- List of exoplanets discovered in 2023
- Astronomical transit
