= K2-415 =

Red Dwarf Star

Observation data Epoch J2000 Equinox ICRS
- Constellation: Cancer
- Right ascension: 09^{h} 08^{m} 48.85461^{s}
- Declination: +11° 51′ 41.1161″
- Apparent magnitude (V): 15.330

Characteristics
- Evolutionary stage: Main sequence
- Spectral type: M5V
- Apparent magnitude (V): 15.330±0.027
- Apparent magnitude (G): 13.7957±0.0004
- Apparent magnitude (J): 10.739±0.026
- Apparent magnitude (H): 10.170±0.023
- Apparent magnitude (K): 9.899±0.023

Astrometry
Proper motion (μ)	RA: -458.503 mas/yr Dec.: 192.574 mas/yr
Parallax (π)	45.8625±0.0196 mas
Distance	71.12 ± 0.03 ly (21.804 ± 0.009 pc)

Details
Mass	0.1635±0.0041 M_{☉}
Radius	0.1965±0.0058 R_{☉}
Luminosity (bolometric)	0.00351+0.00033 −0.00030 L_{☉}
Surface gravity (log g)	5.066±0.027 cgs
Temperature	3173±53 K
Metallicity [Fe/H]	−0.13±0.18 dex
Rotation	4.26±0.12 d
Rotational velocity (v sin i)	~2.3 km/s

Other designations
- K2-415, GJ 11330, G 41-26, LHS 5144, LSPM J0908+1151, NLTT 21051, EPIC 211414619, TOI-5557, TIC 323687123, 2MASS J09084885+1151411

Database references
SIMBAD	data

K2-415 is an M5 red dwarf star located 72 light-years from Earth. K2-415 has a mass that is 16% of the mass of the Sun.

== Planetary system ==
The star has one known planet orbiting it: K2-415b.

The K2-415 planetary system
Companion (in order from star)	Mass	Semimajor axis (AU)	Orbital period (days)	Eccentricity	Inclination (°)	Radius
b	3.0±2.7 M_{🜨}	0.0270±0.00023	4.0179694±0.0000027	—	89.32±0.41	1.015±0.051 R_{🜨}
