= TOI-4342 =

Red dwarf star with planets in the constellation Octans

Observation data Epoch J2000.0 Equinox ICRS
- Constellation: Octans
- Right ascension: 21^{h} 37^{m} 32.864^{s}
- Declination: −77° 58′ 43.51″
- Apparent magnitude (V): 12.669±0.057

Characteristics
- Evolutionary stage: main sequence
- Spectral type: M0V
- Apparent magnitude (B): 14.055±0.011
- Apparent magnitude (J): 9.832±0.024
- Apparent magnitude (H): 9.179±0.024
- Apparent magnitude (K): 9.018±0.021
- Variable type: planetary transit

Astrometry
Radial velocity (R_{v})	−4.43±0.36 km/s
Proper motion (μ)	RA: 120.333±0.019 mas/yr Dec.: −91.503±0.018 mas/yr
Parallax (π)	16.2487±0.0184 mas
Distance	200.7 ± 0.2 ly (61.54 ± 0.07 pc)

Details
Mass	0.6296±0.0086 M_{☉}
Radius	0.599±0.013 R_{☉}
Luminosity	0.0746±0.0053 L_{☉}
Surface gravity (log g)	4.6878+0.0086 −0.0096 cgs
Temperature	3901±69 K
Metallicity [Fe/H]	0.187 dex
Rotation	~14 d

Other designations
- TOI-4342, TIC 354944123, 2MASS J21373286−7758435, Gaia DR2 6355915466180482944, Gaia DR3 6355915466181029376, GALAH 171003003101372

Database references
SIMBAD	data
Exoplanet Archive	data

TOI-4342 is a red dwarf star in the constellation Octans located 201 light-years from Earth. It hosts two transiting exoplanets. Both planets are considered to be good targets for transmission spectroscopy measurements for determination of atmospheric composition.

== Stellar characteristics ==
TOI-4342 is an early red dwarf with an effective temperature of 3901±69 K, corresponding to the spectral class M0V. It is a single star with stellar companions ruled out by sky surveys, speckle imaging and the radial velocity method.

== Planetary system ==
The star hosts two planets discovered by the transit method. They were initially observed in TESS data from Sector 13 (June and July 2019) and Sector 27 (July 2020) and were validated with ground based observations with LCO telescope network during 2021, with a study published in 2023. Spectroscopic measurements of the star for the purposes of radial velocity measurements to determine the planets' masses were performed by ESPRESSO between April 2022 and March 2023, as well as NIRPS at the ESO 3.6 m Telescope between August and October 2023. The planets are orbiting close to a 2:1 mean-motion resonance.

The TOI-4342 planetary system
Companion (in order from star)	Mass	Semimajor axis (AU)	Orbital period (days)	Eccentricity	Inclination (°)	Radius
b	7.3±1.3 M_{🜨}	0.0519+0.00020 −0.00021	5.5382592±0.0000034	~0	88.83±0.22	2.329+0.086 −0.085 R_{🜨}
c	4.8±1.4 M_{🜨}	0.0804+0.00032 −0.00031	10.688662±0.000015	~0	89.61±0.26	2.349+0.094 −0.092 R_{🜨}
d (candidate)	>17.8+2.9 −3.0 M_{🜨}	0.2154+0.0040 −0.0043	47.5±1.3	~0	—	—

Both planets are sub-Neptunes, similar in size, expected to have atmospheres with a significant fraction of hydrogen and helium. Based on the calculated insolation, the planets are expected to have equilibrium temperatures of 633.6+6.2
−6.3 K and 508.9+5.0
−5.0 K respectively.

While the planets have very similar radii, their masses are measured to be significantly different. The densities calculated from the measured values for radius and mass are 3.18+0.70
−0.63 g⋅cm^{−3} for the planet b and 2.01+0.65
−0.60 g⋅cm^{−3} for the planet c. There are different possible interpretations for their compositions based on those density values. TOI-4342 b could be an ocean world with an Earth-like core surrounded by a ~50% mass fraction steam atmosphere, or it could have a much less massive hydrogen-rich atmosphere instead. The lower inferred density together with a lower equilibrium temperature of TOI-4342 c is not compatible with the water-dominated envelope models, instead pointing at a higher abundance of hydrogen and helium.

Radial velocity measurements also point at existence of an additional planet candidate orbiting on a ~48-day orbit with a minimum mass of 17.8±3.0 M_{🜨}, which however hasn't been detected in TESS transits. This is likely due to a larger orbital inclination, in which case transits are not visible from Earth, but it is possible transits were missed due to the limited time span of available observations as of January 2026. TESS is scheduled to observe the star again for three months during 2026, during which time transits, if occurring, should be detected.

Due to orbiting within 5% of the 2:1 mean-motion resonance, the system is expected to show transit-timing variations due to mutual perturbations. Observation of the amplitudes of this perturbation could additionally help constrain planet masses. However, the limited observations available by the time of the discovery paper were only adequate to rule out deviations by more than 5 min from linear ephemerides. The observed low value of perturbation also confirms a low orbital eccentricity for the planets. The follow-up study published in 2026 also failed to observe any transit-timing variations, noting that the signal-to-noise ratio of TESS and ground-based transit data is too small for clear detection of the predicted amplitudes based on the masses determined from radial velocity measurements.

== See also ==
- TOI-270 – another M-type main sequence star with two sub-Neptunes
