= HD 220074 =

Star in the constellation Cassiopeia

Observation data Epoch J2000.0 Equinox ICRS
- Constellation: Cassiopeia
- Right ascension: 23^{h} 20^{m} 14.37955^{s}
- Declination: +61° 58′ 12.4607″
- Apparent magnitude (V): +6.39

Characteristics
- Evolutionary stage: Red-giant branch
- Spectral type: M2III
- Apparent magnitude (G): 5.64
- B−V color index: 1.678±0.010

Astrometry
Radial velocity (R_{v})	−36.89±0.21 km/s
Proper motion (μ)	RA: +7.423±0.022 mas/yr Dec.: −5.081±0.023 mas/yr
Parallax (π)	3.0137±0.0210 mas
Distance	1,082 ± 8 ly (332 ± 2 pc)
Absolute magnitude (M_{V})	−1.52

Details
Mass	1.2±0.3 M_{☉}
Radius	60±6 R_{☉}
Luminosity	783±20 L_{☉}
Surface gravity (log g)	1.3±0.5 cgs
Temperature	3,935±110 K
Metallicity [Fe/H]	−0.25±0.25 dex
Rotational velocity (v sin i)	3.0 km/s
Age	4.5±2.8 Gyr

Other designations
- BD+61°2427, GC 32499, HD 220074, HIP 115218, HR 8881, SAO 20567

Database references
SIMBAD	data
Exoplanet Archive	data

HD 220074 is a star located in the northern constellation of Cassiopeia, near the western border with Cepheus. It has a reddish hue and is dimly visible to the naked eye, having an apparent visual magnitude of +6.39. The star is located at a distance of approximately 1,082 light years from the Sun based on parallax, but is drifting closer with a radial velocity of −37 km/s. It is currently the largest star known to have an exoplanet.

This star was assigned a stellar classification of K1V in the Bright Star Catalogue but is now known to be a red giant with a class of M2III, based on its radius and surface gravity. With the supply of hydrogen at its core exhausted, the star has expanded and cooled off the main sequence. It is around 4.5 billion years old with an estimated mass equal to ~1.2 times the mass of the Sun but 60 times the Sun's radius. The star is radiating 783 times the luminosity of the Sun from its enlarged photosphere at an effective temperature of 3,935 K.

== Planetary system ==
From September 2008 to June 2012, the team B.-C. Lee, I. Han, and M.-G. Park observed HD 220074 with "the high-resolution spectroscopy of the fiber-fed Bohyunsan Observatory Echelle Spectrograph (BOES) at Bohyunsan Optical Astronomy Observatory (BOAO)".

In 2012, a long-period, wide-orbiting eccentric planet was deduced by radial velocity changes. This finding was published in November, gaining the designation HD 220074 b. Along with HD 208527 b this is one of the first two candidate planets found orbiting red giants.

The HD 220074 planetary system
Companion (in order from star)	Mass	Semimajor axis (AU)	Orbital period (days)	Eccentricity	Inclination (°)	Radius
b	≥11.1±1.8 M_{J}	1.6±0.1	672.1±3.7	0.14±0.05	—	—
