= Gliese 806 =

Red dwarf star in the northern constellation of Cygnus

Observation data Epoch J2000 Equinox ICRS
- Constellation: Cygnus
- Right ascension: 20^{h} 45^{m} 04.09925^{s}
- Declination: +44° 29′ 56.6451″
- Apparent magnitude (V): +10.79

Characteristics
- Spectral type: dM1.5
- B−V color index: 1.491±0.005

Astrometry
Radial velocity (R_{v})	−24.99±0.15 km/s
Proper motion (μ)	RA: 434.028 mas/yr Dec.: 271.022 mas/yr
Parallax (π)	82.8903±0.0167 mas
Distance	39.348 ± 0.008 ly (12.064 ± 0.002 pc)
Absolute magnitude (M_{V})	+10.31

Details
Mass	0.423±0.010 M_{☉}
Radius	0.4144±0.0038 R_{☉}
Luminosity	0.0026±0.0003 L_{☉}
Surface gravity (log g)	4.89±0.07 cgs
Temperature	3,586±51 K
Metallicity [Fe/H]	−0.28±0.07 dex
Rotation	34.6–48.1 d
Rotational velocity (v sin i)	0.46 km/s
Age	~3 Gyr

Other designations
- NSV 13280, BD+44 3567, GJ 806, HIP 102401, LTT 16068, TOI-4481, TIC 239332587, TYC 3178-00633-1, 2MASS J20450403+4429562

Database references
SIMBAD	data
Exoplanet Archive	data
ARICNS	data

Gliese 806 is a star in the northern constellation of Cygnus, located about a degree to the southeast of the bright star Deneb. It is invisible to the naked eye with an apparent visual magnitude of +10.79. The star is located at a distance of 39.3 light years from the Sun based on stellar parallax. It is drifting closer with a radial velocity of −24.6 km/s, and is predicted to come to within 30.1 light-years in ~198,600 years. The star hosts two known planetary companions.

The stellar classification of Gliese 806 is dM1.5, which indicates this is a small red dwarf star – an M-type main-sequence star that is generating energy through core hydrogen fusion. It is roughly three billion years old and is spinning with a projected rotational velocity of 0.46 km/s. The star has 42% of the mass and radius of the Sun. It is radiating 0.3% of the luminosity of the Sun from its photosphere at an effective temperature of 3,586 K.

== Planetary system ==
In 1989, Marcy and Benitz detected a periodicity of 416 days in radial velocity variation, inferring the possible presence of a companion with a mass of about 0.011 M_{☉}. However, this candidate object was never confirmed.

More recently, observations by TESS have found a candidate transiting planet with a period of less than a day. In January 2023, this planet was confirmed and a second, non-transiting planet found via radial velocity observations. A third radial velocity signal was also found, but the study was unable to confirm it as having a planetary origin. All known planets are super-Earths, and the inner transiting planet Gliese 806 b is likely to be rocky.

The Gliese 806 planetary system
Companion (in order from star)	Mass	Semimajor axis (AU)	Orbital period (days)	Eccentricity	Inclination (°)	Radius
b	1.90±0.17 M_{🜨}	0.01406±0.00030	0.9263237±0.0000009	—	87.7+0.6 −0.5	1.331±0.023 R_{🜨}
c	≥5.80±0.30 M_{🜨}	0.0523±0.0011	6.64064±0.00025	—	—	—
(unconfirmed)	≥8.50±0.45 M_{🜨}	0.0844±0.0017	13.60588±0.00065	—	—	—

== See also ==
- Gliese 521
