= HD 36384 =

Red giant star in the constellation Camelopardlis

Observation data Epoch J2000.0 Equinox ICRS
- Constellation: Camelopardalis
- Right ascension: 05^{h} 39^{m} 43.707^{s}
- Declination: +75° 02′ 37.95″
- Apparent magnitude (V): 6.19

Characteristics
- Evolutionary stage: Red giant
- Spectral type: M0 III
- B−V color index: 1.606±0.006
- Variable type: Suspected

Astrometry
Radial velocity (R_{v})	−4.97±0.11 km/s
Proper motion (μ)	RA: −6.701 mas/yr Dec.: 26.589 mas/yr
Parallax (π)	4.7084±0.0277 mas
Distance	693 ± 4 ly (212 ± 1 pc)
Absolute magnitude (M_{V})	−0.46

Details
Mass	1.14±0.15 M_{☉}
Radius	38.4±3.4 R_{☉}
Luminosity	388.28±0.15 L_{☉}
Surface gravity (log g)	1.1±0.2 cgs
Temperature	3,940±40 K
Metallicity [Fe/H]	−0.16±0.14 dex
Rotational velocity (v sin i)	4.5±0.1 km/s
Age	6.8±2.7 Gyr

Other designations
- NSV 2337, BD+74 252, HD 36384, HIP 26638, HR 1844, SAO 5593, PPM 6030

Database references
SIMBAD	data
Exoplanet Archive	data

HD 36384 is a star with an orbiting exoplanet companion in the northern constellation Camelopardalis. It is dimly visible to the naked eye with an apparent visual magnitude of 6.19. The distance to this system is approximately 693 light-years based on parallax measurements, but is drifting closer with a heliocentric radial velocity of −5 km/s.

This is an evolved red giant star with a stellar classification of M0 III. It is a suspected variable star with a pulsation period of around 586 days. The star has 1.1 times the mass of the Sun and has expanded to 38.4 times the Sun's radius. It is radiating 388 times the luminosity of the Sun from its enlarged photosphere at an effective temperature of 3,940 K.

In 2017, radial velocity variations were detected in this star, which were considered to most likely be caused by stellar pulsations. A follow-up study by the same team in 2023 instead interpreted the radial velocity variations as being caused by a planetary companion, in addition to stellar activity. This is a super-jovian exoplanet with at least 6.6 times the mass of Jupiter; the exact mass is unknown since the orbital inclination has not been determined. It was among the six exoplanet discoveries that marked the 5,500 discovery milestone.

The HD 36384 planetary system
Companion (in order from star)	Mass	Semimajor axis (AU)	Orbital period (days)	Eccentricity	Inclination (°)	Radius
b	≥ 6.6±0.5 M_{J}	1.3±0.1	490±3	0.2±0.1	—	—
