= HD 208527 =

M-type star located in the constellation Pegasus

Observation data Epoch J2000.0 Equinox ICRS
- Constellation: Pegasus
- Right ascension: 21^{h} 56^{m} 23.984^{s}
- Declination: +21° 14′ 23.49″
- Apparent magnitude (V): +6.39

Characteristics
- Spectral type: M1III
- B−V color index: 1.698±0.002

Astrometry
Radial velocity (R_{v})	+4.79±0.06 km/s
Proper motion (μ)	RA: +1.433 mas/yr Dec.: +14.675 mas/yr
Parallax (π)	3.0302±0.049 mas
Distance	1,080 ± 20 ly (330 ± 5 pc)
Absolute magnitude (M_{V})	−1.24

Details
Mass	1.6±0.4 M_{☉}
Radius	57.6±6.5 R_{☉}
Luminosity	729±30 L_{☉}
Surface gravity (log g)	1.6±0.3 cgs
Temperature	4,035±65 K
Metallicity [Fe/H]	−0.09±0.16 dex
Rotational velocity (v sin i)	3.6 km/s
Age	2±1.3 Gyr

Other designations
- BD+20°5046, GJ 841.1, HD 208527, HIP 108296, HR 8372, SAO 90112

Database references
SIMBAD	data
Exoplanet Archive	data

HD 208527 is a star with an orbiting exoplanet located in the northern constellation of Pegasus. It has a reddish hue and is dimly visible to the naked eye with an apparent visual magnitude of +6.39. The star is located at a distance of approximately 1,080 light years from the Sun based on parallax, and is drifting further away with a radial velocity of +4.8 km/s.

This was once catalogued as a K-type main-sequence star with a stellar classification of K5V, but is now known as an aging red giant with a class of M1III, based on its dimensions and low surface gravity. This indicates that the two-billion year old star has exhausted the supply of hydrogen at its core then cooled and expanded off the main sequence. It has an estimated 1.6 times the mass of the Sun but has swollen to 58 times the Sun's radius. The star is radiating 729 times the luminosity of the Sun from its enlarged photosphere at an effective temperature of 4,035 K.

== Planetary system ==
From September 2008 to June 2012, the team B.-C. Lee, I. Han and M.-G. Park observed HD 208527 with "the high-resolution spectroscopy of the fiber-fed Bohyunsan Observatory Echelle Spectrograph (BOES) at Bohyunsan Optical Astronomy Observatory (BOAO)".

In 2012, a long-period, wide-orbiting exoplanet was deduced by radial velocity variations. This was published in November, gaining the designation HD 208527 b. Along with HD 220074 b this is one of the first two planets proposed around an M-type red giant.

The HD 208527 planetary system
Companion (in order from star)	Mass	Semimajor axis (AU)	Orbital period (days)	Eccentricity	Inclination (°)	Radius
b	≥9.9±1.7 M_{J}	2.1±0.2	875.5±5.8	0.08±0.04	—	—
