= HD 18438 b =

Exoplanet in constellation Cepheus

Discovery
- Discovered by: Lee Byeong-Cheol et al.
- Discovery date: 15 March 2023 (accepted)
- Detection method: Radial-velocity method

Designations
- Alternative names: BD+78° 103 b; HIP 14417 b; HR 881 b; TIC 297820335 b; TYC 4516-2147-1 b; 2MASS J03060788+7925066 b

Orbital characteristics
- Semi-major axis: 2.1±0.1 AU
- Eccentricity: 0.1±0.1
- Orbital period (sidereal): 803±5 d
- Inclination: 88.49°+0.78° −0.49°
- Semi-amplitude: 305±18 m/s
- Star: HD 18438

Physical characteristics
- Mass: >21±1 M_{J}

HD 18438 b is a substellar object, either a massive gas giant exoplanet or a brown dwarf, orbiting the star HD 18438, a red giant star located about 731 light-years (224 pc) away from Earth.

== Observational history ==
Radial velocity variations of HD 18438 were first analyzed and reported in 2018, which found regular fluctuations with a period of 719.0 days (1.969 years), longer than the stellar rotation period of 562 days (1.54 years). This was then attributed to oscillations of the star itself, as they were similar to that of long secondary period (LSP) giant stars, though a definite conclusion could not be established.

In 2023, however, with four more years of observations, a follow-up study ruled out the association of LSP with the radial velocity variations, and instead determined that the signals, with a revised period of 803 days (2.20 years), were caused by an orbiting planetary (or brown dwarf) companion with a minimum mass of 21 M_{J}. This also agrees with a previous study that provided mass estimates for a companion to HD 18438. In this re-analysis process, the rotation period of the host star was also revised to 637 days (1.74 years) to better match the accumulated data.

== Physical characteristics ==
HD 18438 b is a massive planet with a mass of 21 M_{J} and an estimated radius of 1.08 R_{J}. This is above the deuterium burning limit (~13 M_{J}), and thus according to some definitions, including the IAU standard, it may be classified as a brown dwarf. However, other organizations deem the object a planet, such as the NASA Exoplanet Science Institute, which includes bodies as massive as 30 M_{J} in the NASA Exoplanet Catalog.

== Orbit ==
The planet orbits its host star at a distance of 2.1 AU (310,000,000 km; 200,000,000 mi), taking 803 days (2.20 years) to complete one orbit around the star. It has an orbital eccentricity of 0.1.

== Host star ==
HD 18438 is a red giant with a spectral type of M2.5 III, inflated to a diameter of 88 R_{☉}. If HD 18438 b is to be considered a planet at all, this would make it the largest host to an exoplanet known to date as of September 2024. Its sheer size means that despite having an effective temperature significantly cooler than the Sun at 3,860 K (3,590 °C; 6,490 °F), it shines 929 times as bright. With a mass of 1.84 M_{☉} and an age of 5.5±2.4 Gyr, it is nearing the end of its lifespan, having long since left the main-sequence stage. The star has a low metallicity of −0.4±0.1 dex, meaning it only has an iron content between 32% and 50% that of the Sun.
