= HD 73256 =

Star in the constellation Pyxis

Observation data Epoch J2000.0 Equinox ICRS
- Constellation: Pyxis
- Right ascension: 08^{h} 36^{m} 23.01654^{s}
- Declination: −30° 02′ 15.4462″
- Apparent magnitude (V): 8.08

Characteristics
- Evolutionary stage: main sequence
- Spectral type: G8 IV-V Fe+0.5
- B−V color index: 0.782±0.002
- Variable type: BY Dra

Astrometry
Radial velocity (R_{v})	29.66±0.14 km/s
Proper motion (μ)	RA: −182.193(17) mas/yr Dec.: 67.373(21) mas/yr
Parallax (π)	27.2441±0.0217 mas
Distance	119.72 ± 0.10 ly (36.71 ± 0.03 pc)
Absolute magnitude (M_{V})	5.20

Details
Mass	1.01±0.03 M_{☉}
Radius	0.94±0.02 R_{☉}
Luminosity	0.74±0.01 L_{☉}
Surface gravity (log g)	4.49±0.03 cgs
Temperature	5,532±36 K
Metallicity [Fe/H]	0.29±0.05 dex
Rotational velocity (v sin i)	3.22±0.32 km/s
Age	2.5±2.3 Gyr

Other designations
- CS Pyx, CD−29°6456, HD 73256, HIP 42214, SAO 176159

Database references
SIMBAD	data
Exoplanet Archive	data

HD 73256 is a variable star in the southern constellation of Pyxis. It has the variable star designation CS Pyxidis. With a baseline apparent visual magnitude of 8.08, it requires binoculars or a small telescope to view. The star is located at a distance of 120 light-years from the Sun based on parallax, and is drifting further away with a radial velocity of +30 km/s.

The stellar classification of this star is G8IV-VFe+0.5, which suggests a slightly evolved G-type main-sequence star with a mild overabundance of iron in the spectrum. It is a BY Draconis variable with a period of 13.97 days, showing a variation of 0.03 in magnitude due to chromospheric activity. The star appears overluminous for its class, which may be the result of a high metallicity. The star has roughly the same mass and a slightly smaller radius as the Sun, but is radiating 74% of the Sun's luminosity. It is around 2–3 billion years old and is spinning with a projected rotational velocity of 3.2 km/s.

== Planetary system ==
In 2003, S. Udry and colleagues reported the discovery of a planet in orbit around HD 73256 using data from the CORALIE spectrograph. This object is a hot Jupiter with at least 1.87 times the mass of Jupiter in an orbit with a period of 2.55 days. Assuming the planet is perfectly grey with no greenhouse or tidal effects, and a Bond albedo of 0.1, the temperature would be about 1,300 K. This is close to 51 Pegasi b, and between the predicted temperatures of HD 189733 b and HD 209458 b (1,180–1,392 K), before they were measured. It is a candidate for "near-infrared characterisation with the VLTI Spectro-Imager".

In 2018, K. Ment and colleagues reported an attempt to confirm the existence of this planet using Keck/HIRES data, but were unable to detect it despite a likelihood of success. Thus the existence of this object is disputed.

In 2023, a different substellar companion on a wide orbit, likely a brown dwarf, was discovered using both radial velocity and astrometry. This study also reported a detection of HD 73256 b, but did not update its parameters or address the dispute.

The HD 73256 planetary system
Companion (in order from star)	Mass	Semimajor axis (AU)	Orbital period (days)	Eccentricity	Inclination (°)	Radius
b (disputed)	>1.87 ± 0.49 M_{J}	0.037	2.54858 ± 0.00016	0.029 ± 0.02	—	—
c	16±1 M_{J}	3.8±0.1	2,690+60 −102	0.16±0.07	29+5 −3 or 152+8 −7	—

== See also ==
- HD 72659
- Lists of planets
