= Warm Jupiter =

Type of exoplanet

A warm Jupiter is a gas giant exoplanet whose orbit lies between those of the hot Jupiters and the cold giant planets found beyond about 1 astronomical unit (AU) from their stars. Definitions vary: Huang, Wu and Triaud define warm Jupiters as giant planets with an orbital period between 10 and 200 days, while Petrovich and Tremaine define them as gas giants with a projected mass M sin i greater than 0.1 Jupiter masses and a semi-major axis between 0.1 and 1 AU.

The origin of warm Jupiters is unexplained. Most have pericenter distances too large for their orbits to have shrunk significantly through tidal friction, and most have relatively high eccentricities, which migration through the protoplanetary disk would tend to damp rather than excite. Data from the Kepler space telescope show that about half of warm Jupiters have close, small planetary companions, whereas hot Jupiters, with the single exception of WASP-47b, have none; Huang, Wu and Triaud take this as evidence that these warm Jupiters formed in place.
