= List of exoplanets discovered in 2011 =

This is a List of exoplanets discovered in 2011.

For exoplanets detected only by radial velocity, the mass value is actually a lower limit. (See Minimum mass for more information)

Name	Mass (M_{J})	Radius (R_{J})	Period (days)	Semi-major axis (AU)	Temp. (K)	Discovery method	Distance (ly)	Host star mass (M_{☉})	Host star temp. (K)	Remarks
7 Canis Majoris b	1.85		735.1	1.758		radial vel.	64.65	1.34	4826	
82 G. Eridani b	0.0085		18.315	0.1207	660	radial vel.	19.57	0.7	5401	
82 G. Eridani c	0.015		90.309	0.3499	388	radial vel.	19.57	0.7	5401	
BD+48 738 b	0.91		392.6	1.0		radial vel.	2910	0.74	4414	
CFBDSIR J145829+101343 b	10.5		10037.5	2.6	370	imaging	75.34	0.02	580	Likely brown dwarf
CoRoT-16b	0.535	1.17	5.35227	0.0618	1086	transit	2740	1.1	5650	
CoRoT-17b	2.43	1.02	3.7681	0.0461	1626	transit	3001	1.04	5740	
CoRoT-18b	3.47	1.31	1.9000693	0.0295	1550	transit	2838	0.95	5440	
CoRoT-19b	1.11	1.29	3.89713	0.0518	2000	transit	2511	1.21	6090	
CoRoT-20b	4.3	0.84	9.24285	0.09	1024	transit	2819	1.14	4947	
COROT-21b	2.26±0.31	1.30±0.14	2.72474±0.00014	0.0417±0.0011		transit	4560±930	1.29±0.09	6200±100	
CoRoT-23b	2.8	1.05	3.6313	0.048	1660	transit	1957	1.14	5900	
Gliese 433 b	0.01901		7.3705	0.062		radial vel.	29.58	0.48	3461	
Gliese 667 Cc	0.012		28.14	0.125		radial vel.	22.18	0.33	3350	Potentially habitable exoplanet
Gliese 785 b	0.0532		74.72	0.32	355	radial vel.	28.7	0.8	5166	
Gliese 785 c	0.076		525.8	1.18	185	radial vel.	28.7	0.8	5166	
HAT-P-27b	0.62	1.02	3.039577	0.04		transit	665.38	0.94	5300	
HAT-P-28b	0.626	1.212	3.257215	0.0434	1384	transit	1288	1.02	5680	
HAT-P-29b	0.88	1.17	5.72319	0.0667	1271	transit	1032	1.45	6087	Proper name Surt
HAT-P-30b	0.83	1.44	2.8106	0.0419	1630	transit	702.2	1.55	6304	Independent discoveries
HAT-P-31b	2.27	1.09	5.00542	0.061	1450	transit	1133	1.31	6065	Additional planet in system suspected.
HAT-P-32b	0.68	1.98	2.1500082	0.03397	1836	transit	950.81	1.13	6001	
HAT-P-33b	0.92	1.85	3.47447	0.04995	1782	transit	1306	1.82	6446	
HD 1461 c	0.01759		13.5052	0.1117		radial vel.	76.5	1.02	5765	Planet confirmed in 2015
HD 1502 b	2.75		428.5	1.262		radial vel.	626.11	1.46	4947	Proper name Indépendance
HD 5891 b	7.63		177.11	0.64		radial vel.	932.02	1.93	4673	
HD 7199 b	0.27		615	1.36		radial vel.	118.04	0.77	5371	Proper name Hairu
HD 7449 A b	0.508		1255.5	2.38		radial vel.	126.26	1.05	6024	
HD 14651 b	47±3.4		79.4179±0.0021	0.361±0.013		radial vel.	127	0.96±0.03	5491±26	Brown dwarf or star
HD 18742 b	3.4		766	1.82		radial vel.	532.86	1.36	4940	Proper name Bagan
HD 20003 b	0.0378±0.0031		11.849±0.003	0.0974±0.0016		radial vel.	136.6±0.2	0.942±0.046	5510^{+48}_{−137}	
HD 20003 c	0.0422±0.0040		33.823±0.065	0.1961±0.0032		radial vel.	136.6±0.2	0.942±0.046	5510^{+48}_{−137}	
HD 20781 b	0.0334^{+0.0038}_{−0.0037}		29.158^{+0.0102}_{−0.01}	0.1647^{+0.0076}_{−0.0083}		radial vel.	115.36±4.4	0.7	5256±29	
HD 20781 c	0.0442±0.0049		85.5073^{+0.0983}_{−0.0947}	0.3374^{+0.0155}_{−0.017}		radial vel.	115.36±4.4	0.7	5256±29	
HD 21693 b	0.0259^{+0.0034}_{−0.0033}	0.1976	22.6786^{+0.0085}_{−0.0087}	0.1455^{+0.0058}_{−0.0063}		radial vel.	105.61±1.66	0.8	5430±26	Confirmed in 2017.
HD 21693 c	0.0547±0.0056		53.7357^{+0.0312}_{−0.0309}	0.2586^{+0.0103}_{−0.0113}		radial vel.	105.61±1.66	0.8	5430±26	Confirmed in 2017.
HD 22781 b	13.65		528.07	1.167		radial vel.	106.43	0.75	5027	
HD 28678 b	1.542		380.2	1.18		radial vel.	622.72	1.53	4972	Proper name Tassili
HD 30246 b	55.1^{+20.3}_{−8.2}		990.7±5.6	2.012±0.069		radial vel.	160	1.05±0.04	5833±44	Brown dwarf or star
HD 30856 b	1.547		847	1.85		radial vel.	429.56	1.17	4895	Proper name Nakanbé
HD 31527 b	0.0329±0.0028		16.5535^{+0.0034}_{−0.0035}	0.1254^{+0.0041}_{−0.0045}		radial vel.	125.8±2.9	0.96	5898±13	Planet confirmed in 2017
HD 31527 c	0.0445±0.0040.0039		51.2053^{+0.0373}_{−0.0368}	0.2663^{+0.0088}_{−0.0095}		radial vel.	125.8±2.9	0.96	5898±13	Planet confirmed in 2017
HD 31527 d	0.0372^{+0.0053}_{−0.0052}		271.6737^{+2.1135}_{−2.2471}	0.8098^{+0.0273}_{−0.0293}		radial vel.	125.8±2.9	0.96	5898±13	Planet confirmed in 2017
HD 33142 b	1.385		326	1.07		radial vel.	397.27	1.41	4978	
HD 38283 b	0.34		363.2	1.02		radial vel.	123	1.085	5945	Proper name Yanyan
HD 39194 b	0.0126		5.63	0.056±0.001		radial vel.	71.43	0.67±0.04	5205±23	Confirmed in 2017 and 2021.
HD 39194 c	0.0198		14.03	0.103±0.002		radial vel.	71.43	0.67±0.04	5205±23	Confirmed in 2017 and 2021.
HD 39194 d	0.0126		33.91	0.185±0.033		radial vel.	71.43	0.67±0.04	5205±23	Confirmed in 2017 and 2021.
HD 45184 b	0.0384^{+0.0033}_{−0.0032}		5.8854±0.0003	0.0644^{+0.002}_{−0.0021}		radial vel.	71.36±0.62	1.03	5869±14	Confirmed in 2017
HD 51608 b	0.0402^{+0.0038}_{−0.0037}		14.0726±0.0016	0.1059^{+0.0043}_{−0.0046}		radial vel.	113.6±2.02	0.8	5358±22	Confirmed in 2017.
HD 51608 c	0.045^{+0.0051}_{−0.0048}		95.9446^{+0.1555}_{−0.1366}	0.3809^{+0.0153}_{−0.0164}		radial vel.	113.6±2.02	0.8	5358±22	Confirmed in 2017.
HD 82886 b	2.33		705	1.58		radial vel.	415.93	2.53	4953	Proper name Arber
HD 85512 b	0.01		58.43	0.26	298	radial vel.	36.79	0.43	4300	
HD 93385 Ac	0.0223		13.18	0.112±0.002		radial vel.	141.6±0.2	1.04±0.01	5823±35	Originally planet HD 93385 b, confirmed in 2017, renamed in 2021
HD 93385 Ad	0.0274		45.84	0.2565±0.0043		radial vel.	141.6±0.2	1.04±0.01	5823±35	Originally planet HD 93385 c, confirmed in 2017, renamed in 2021.
HD 96063 b	1.27		362.5	1.11		radial vel.	458.66	1.37	5020	Proper name Ramajay
HD 96127 b	20.96		647.3	1.42		radial vel.	1949	10.94	3943	Likely not a planet, but a star
HD 96700 b	0.0280		8.12	0.0777±0.0013		radial vel.	84±1	0.89±0.01	5845±13	Also unconfirmed planet between orbits b and c
HD 96700 c	0.0400		103.5	0.424±0.007		radial vel.	84±1	0.89±0.01	5845±13	Also unconfirmed planet between orbits b and c
HD 98219 b	1.964		433.8	1.26		radial vel.	372.06	1.41	4925	Proper name Ixbalanqué
HD 99706 b	1.23		841	1.98		radial vel.	480.15	1.46	4862	
HD 100655 b	1.61		157.57001	0.68		radial vel.	449.2	2.28	4891	Proper name Sazum
HD 102329 b	8.16		778.1	1.81		radial vel.	712.41	3.21	4745	
HD 106270 b	10.13		1888	3.34		radial vel.	306.79	1.39	5509	
HD 108863 b	2.414		437.7	1.32		radial vel.	539.87	1.59	4878	
HD 116029 b	1.4		670	1.65		radial vel.	403.4	0.83	4819	One more planet in the system (unconfirmed)
HD 126525 b	0.237±0.002		960.41^{+6.19}_{−6.33}	1.837±0.010		radial vel.	124.1^{+4.3}_{−4.6}	0.90±0.01	5638±13	
HD 131496 b	1.8		896	2.01		radial vel.	431.65	1.34	4846	Proper name Madriu
HD 132563 Bb	1.49		1544	2.62		radial vel.	344.01	1.08	6073	
HD 134060 b	0.0318^{+0.0025}_{−0.0024}		3.2696±0.0001	0.0444±0.0007		radial vel.	78.38±0.07	1.095	5966±14	Eccentric orbit, confirmed in 2017.
HD 134060 c	0.0922^{+0.0139}_{−0.0133}		1292^{+48}_{−44}	2.226±0.051		radial vel.	78.38±0.07	1.095	5966±14	Confirmed in 2017.
HD 134606 b	0.0292±0.0030		12.083±0.010	0.1023±0.0017		radial vel.	87.45±0.07	0.998±0.024	5616±34	
HD 134606 c	0.0382±0.0053		59.52±0.17	0.2962±0.0049		radial vel.	87.45±0.07	0.998±0.024	5616±34	
HD 134606 d	0.1212±0.0130		459.3±8.3	1.157±0.024		radial vel.	87.45±0.07	0.998±0.024	5616±34	
HD 137388 b	0.2		330	0.89		radial vel.	132.2	0.68	5181	Proper name Kererū
HD 142245 b	3.07		1299	2.78		radial vel.	318.01	3.5	4922	
HD 152581 b	1.869		686.5	1.66		radial vel.	543.2	1.3	5027	Proper name Ganja
HD 156279 b	9.88		131.05	0.49		radial vel.	118.17	0.95	5453	
HD 158038 b	1.53		521	1.5		radial vel.	310.25	1.3	4860	
HD 150433 b	0.168±0.020		1096±27	1.930±0.045		radial vel.	99.36±0.10			
HD 154088 b	0.0208		18.56±0.01	0.134±0.002		radial vel.	58.2±0.5	0.91±0.02	5374±43	Confirmed in 2021
HD 157172 b	0.12		104.84±0.13	0.416±0.007		radial vel.	107.75±0.22			
HD 163607 b	0.7836		75.2203	0.362		radial vel.	221.53	1.12	5522	
HD 163607 c	2.201		1272	2.39		radial vel.	221.53	1.12	5522	
HD 164509 b	0.443		280.17	0.87		radial vel.	173.49	1.12	5922	
HD 189567 b	0.0267		14.3	0.111±0.002		radial vel.	58.43±0.04	0.83±0.01	5726±15	Confirmed in 2021, also unconfirmed planet HD 189567 c in the system
HD 192310 c	0.076		525.8	1.18		radial vel.	28.7	0.78	5069	
HD 204313 c	0.0553		34.905	0.2099		radial vel.	154	1.02	5776	Confirmed in 2015.
HD 215152 c	0.0054^{+0.0019}_{−0.0023}		7.2824^{+0.0045}_{−0.0083}	0.06739^{+0.00086}_{−0.00089}		radial vel.	70.48±0.16	0.770±0.015	4935±76	Confirmed in 2018.
HD 215152 d	0.0088^{+0.0025}_{−0.0029}		10.8650^{+0.0056}_{−0.0061}	0.0880^{+0.0011}_{−0.0012}		radial vel.	70.48±0.16	0.770±0.015	4935±76	Confirmed in 2018.
HD 204941 b	0.266		1733	2.55		radial vel.	93.74	0.58	5026	
HD 215456 b	0.101		191.99±0.73	0.652±0.011		radial vel.	129.3±0.2			
HD 215456 c	0.246		2277±67	3.394±0.088		radial vel.	129.3±0.2			
HD 240237 b	15.89		745.7	1.92		radial vel.	3125	8.76	3926	
HIP 5158 c	15.04		9017.76	7.7		radial vel.	168.56	0.78	4962	
HIP 57274 b	0.02		8.1352	0.07		radial vel.	84.41	0.29	4510	
HIP 57274 c	0.40902		32.03	0.178		radial vel.	84.41	0.29	4510	
HIP 57274 d	0.5267		431.7	1.01		radial vel.	84.41	0.29	4510	
HU Aquarii b	5.9		2390	3.6		timing	626.89	0.88	5952	Controversial
HU Aquarii c	4.5		4368	5.4		timing	626.89	0.88	5952	Controversial
Kepler-10b	0.0145	0.132	0.837491	0.0172	2130	transit	608.3	0.91	5708	
Kepler-10c	0.02319	0.207	45.2946	0.241	584	transit	608.3	0.91	5708	
Kepler-11b	0.006	0.161	10.3039	0.091		transit	2148	0.96	5663	
Kepler-11c	0.009	0.256	13.0241	0.107		transit	2148	0.96	5663	
Kepler-11d	0.023	0.278	22.6845	0.155		transit	2148	0.96	5663	
Kepler-11e	0.025	0.374	31.9996	0.195		transit	2148	0.96	5663	
Kepler-11f	0.006	0.222	46.6888	0.25		transit	2148	0.96	5663	
Kepler-11g	0.079	0.297	118.3807	0.466		transit	2148	0.96	5663	
Kepler-12b	0.432	1.754	4.4379629	0.0553	1480	transit	2950	1.17	5947	
Kepler-13b	9.28	1.512	1.763588	0.03641	2550	transit	1354	1.72	7650	
Kepler-14b	8.4	1.136	6.790123	0.0771	1605	transit	3196	1.51	6395	
Kepler-15b	0.66	0.96	4.942782	0.05714	1251	transit	2464	1.02	5515	
Kepler-16b	0.333	0.754	228.776	0.7048		transit	245.44	0.69	4450	
Kepler-17b	2.45	1.31	1.4857108	0.02591	1570	transit	2609	1.16	5781	
Kepler-18b	0.022	0.178	3.504725	0.0447		transit	1430	0.97	5345	
Kepler-18c	0.054	0.49	7.64159	0.0752		transit	1430	0.97	5345	
Kepler-18d	0.052	0.623	14.85888	0.1172		transit	1430	0.97	5345	
Kepler-19b	0.02643	0.197	9.28716	0.085		transit	717.4	0.94	5544	
Kepler-19c	0.04122		28.731			timing	717.4	0.94	5544	
Kepler-20b	0.03052	0.167	3.69611525	0.0463	1105	transit	929.18	0.95	5495	
Kepler-20c	0.04012	0.272	10.85409089	0.0949	772	transit	929.18	0.95	5495	
Kepler-20d	0.03168	0.245	77.61130017	0.3506	401	transit	929.18	0.95	5495	
Kepler-20e	0.01	0.077	6.09852281	0.0639	1040	transit	929.18	0.95	5495	
Kepler-20f	0.045	0.089	19.57758478	0.1396	705	transit	929.18	0.95	5495	
Kepler-21b	0.01598	0.146	2.78578	0.042717	2025	transit	370	1.41	6305	
Kepler-22b	0.113	0.212	289.8623	0.849	262	transit	619.72	0.97	5518	Potentially habitable exoplanet
Kepler-23b	0.8	0.17	7.1073	0.075		transit	2793	1.1	5828	
Kepler-23c	2.7	0.285	10.7421	0.099		transit	2793	1.1	5828	
Kepler-24b	1.6	0.214	8.1453	0.08		transit	3901	0.98	5897	
Kepler-24c	1.6	0.25	12.3335	0.106		transit	3901	0.98	5897	
Kepler-25b	0.0275	0.245	6.238297	0.068		transit	798.98	1.19	6270	
Kepler-25c	0.0479	0.465	12.7207	0.11		transit	798.98	1.19	6270	
Kepler-26b	0.01611	0.248	12.28	0.08551	427	transit	1104	0.54	3914	
Kepler-26c	0.01951	0.243	17.2559	0.10725	381	transit	1104	0.54	3914	
Kepler-27b	9.11	0.357	15.3348	0.118		transit	3507	0.65	5400	
Kepler-27c	13.8	0.437	31.3309	0.191		transit	3507	0.65	5400	
Kepler-28b	1.51	0.321	5.9123	0.062	583	transit	1448	0.75	4590	
Kepler-28c	1.36	0.303	8.9858	0.081	507	transit	1448	0.75	4590	
Kepler-29b	0.01419	0.299	10.3384	0.09		transit	2779	0.98	5701	
Kepler-29c	0.01259	0.28	13.2884	0.11		transit	2779	0.98	5701	
Kepler-31b		0.491	20.8613	0.16		transit	5700	1.21	6340	
Kepler-31c	4.7	0.473	42.6318	0.26		transit	5700	1.21	6340	
Kepler-32b	4.1	0.196	5.90124	0.05	530	transit	1066	0.58	3900	
Kepler-32c	0.5	0.178	8.7522	0.09	470	transit	1066	0.58	3900	
Kepler-33b		0.155	5.66793	0.0677		transit	4086	1.29	5904	
Kepler-33c	0.00123	0.285	13.17562	0.1189		transit	4086	1.29	5904	
Kepler-33d	0.0123	0.477	21.77596	0.1662		transit	4086	1.29	5904	
Kepler-33e	0.01753	0.359	31.7844	0.2138		transit	4086	1.29	5904	
Kepler-39b	20.1	1.24	21.08721	0.164	897	transit	3557	1.29	6350	Brown dwarf
Kepler-41b	0.56	1.29	1.8555582	0.03101	1790	transit	3680	1.15	5750	
Kepler-42b		0.07	1.2137672	0.0116	519	transit	126.23	0.13	3068	
Kepler-42c		0.065	0.45328509	0.006	720	transit	126.23	0.13	3068	
Kepler-42d		0.051	1.865169	0.0154	450	transit	126.23	0.13	3068	
Kepler-43 b	3.23	1.219	3.0240949	0.046	1620	transit	3379	1.32	6041	
Kepler-44b	1.0	1.09	3.2467293	0.0446	1544	transit	4009	1.12	5800	
Kepler-45b	0.505	0.96	2.455239	0.03	1000	transit	1086	0.59	3820	
Kepler-70b	0.0014	0.068	0.240104	0.006		orbital brightness modulation	3849	0.5	27730	Controversial
Kepler-70c	0.0021	0.077	0.342887	0.0076		orbital brightness modulation	3849	0.5	27730	Controversial
MOA-2009-BLG-266Lb	0.033		2774	3.2		microlensing	9900	0.56		
Nu^{2} Lupi b	0.0145	0.132	11.57779^{+0.00091}_{−0.0011}	0.0969^{+0.0019}_{−0.0017}		radial vel.	47.85±0.07	0.87±0.04	5664±61	
Nu^{2} Lupi c	0.0355	0.233	27.5909^{+0.0028}_{−0.0031}	0.1729^{+0.0034}_{−0.0030}		radial vel.	47.85±0.07	0.87±0.04	5664±61	
Nu^{2} Lupi d	0.0278	0.229	107.245±0.050	0.425±0.012		radial vel.	47.85±0.07	0.87±0.04	5664±61	
NY Vir (AB) b	2.16		3140	3.3		timing	1800	0.6	33000	Circumbinary planet Disputed planet.
NY Vir (AB) c	3.94		8310	7.54		timing	1800	0.6	33000	Circumbinary planet Disputed planet.
PSR J1719-1438 b	1.2		0.09070629	0.0044		timing	3914	1.4	4500	Shortest orbital period of any known exoplanet
Qatar-2 b	2.494	1.254	1.33711647	0.02153	1344	transit	594.67	0.74	4645	
TrES-5	1.79	1.194	1.48224686	0.02459	1480	transit	1188	0.9	5171	
UZ Fornacis b	6.3		5840	5.9		timing	781.5	0.7	5286	false positive
UZ Fornacis c	7.7		1916.25	2.8		timing	781.5	0.7	5286	unconfirmed as of 2020
WASP-35b	0.72±0.06	1.32±0.03	3.16158	0.04317		transit	663.39	1.05	5990	
WASP-39b	0.28	1.27	4.055259	0.0486	1166	transit	750.18	0.93	5400	Proper name Bocaprins
WASP-43b	1.78	0.93	0.813475	0.0142	1427	transit	260.93	0.58	4400	
WASP-44b	0.87	1.1	2.423804	0.03453	1337	transit	1201	0.94	5420	
WASP-45b	0.964	0.946	3.126089	0.03963	1153	transit	693.04	0.85	5150	
WASP-46b	1.91	1.174	1.43036763	0.02335	1636	transit	1237	0.83	5600	
WASP-48b	0.8	1.5	2.14363	0.03444	2035	transit	1501	0.88	5920	
WASP-50 b	1.4688	1.166	1.9551	0.0293	1395	transit	606.08	0.89	5400	Proper name Maeping
WD 0806-661 b	7.5			2500	323	imaging	62.62	0.62	9552	Y-type sub-brown dwarf

== Specific exoplanet lists ==
Lists of exoplanets

- List of directly imaged exoplanets
- List of exoplanet extremes
- List of exoplanet firsts
- List of exoplanets discovered by the Kepler space telescope
- List of exoplanets observed during Kepler's K2 mission
- List of exoplanets discovered by the TESS mission
- List of terrestrial exoplanet candidates for atmosphere detection
- List of hottest exoplanets
- List of coldest exoplanets
- List of multiplanetary systems
- List of circumbinary planets
- List of nearest exoplanets
- List of nearest terrestrial exoplanet candidates
- List of potentially habitable exoplanets
- List of proper names of exoplanets
- List of largest exoplanets
- List of smallest exoplanets
- List of transiting exoplanets
- List of exoplanets and planetary debris around giant stars
- List of exoplanets and planetary debris around white dwarfs
- List of extrasolar planetary collisions

=== Lists of exoplanets by year of discovery ===
- List of exoplanets discovered before 2000 (31)
- List of exoplanets discovered between 2000–2009 (376)
- List of exoplanets discovered in 2010 (109)
- List of exoplanets discovered in 2011 (178)
- List of exoplanets discovered in 2012 (147)
- List of exoplanets discovered in 2013 (149)
- List of exoplanets discovered in 2014 (869)
- List of exoplanets discovered in 2015 (144)
- List of exoplanets discovered in 2016 (1497)
- List of exoplanets discovered in 2017 (152)
- List of exoplanets discovered in 2018 (300)
- List of exoplanets discovered in 2019 (169)
- List of exoplanets discovered in 2020 (256)
- List of exoplanets discovered in 2021 (253)
- List of exoplanets discovered in 2022 (312)
- List of exoplanets discovered in 2023 (304)
- List of exoplanets discovered in 2024 (284)
- List of exoplanets discovered in 2025 (239)
- List of exoplanets discovered in 2026 (355)
