= WASP-44 =

Star in the constellation Cetus

Observation data Epoch J2000 Equinox ICRS
- Constellation: Cetus
- Right ascension: 00^{h} 15^{m} 36.76947^{s}
- Declination: −11° 56′ 17.2848″
- Apparent magnitude (V): 13.05

Characteristics
- Evolutionary stage: main sequence
- Spectral type: G8V

Astrometry
Radial velocity (R_{v})	−3.10±1.32 km/s
Proper motion (μ)	RA: 15.272(22) mas/yr Dec.: −30.159(14) mas/yr
Parallax (π)	2.7644±0.0199 mas
Distance	1,180 ± 8 ly (362 ± 3 pc)

Details
Mass	0.929+0.053 −0.050 M_{☉}
Radius	0.923+0.021 −0.020 R_{☉}
Luminosity	0.680+0.031 −0.029 L_{☉}
Surface gravity (log g)	4.476±0.030 cgs
Temperature	5457±46 K
Metallicity [Fe/H]	0.099+0.092 −0.089 dex
Rotational velocity (v sin i)	3.20±0.90 km/s
Age	6.0+4.3 −3.8 Gyr

Other designations
- TOI-259, TIC 12862099, WASP-44, GSC 05264-00740, 2MASS J00153675-1156172

Database references
SIMBAD	data
Exoplanet Archive	data

WASP-44 is a G-type star about 1,180 light-years (360 parsecs) away in the constellation Cetus that is orbited by the Jupiter-size planet WASP-44b. The star is slightly less massive and slightly smaller than the Sun; it is also slightly cooler, but is more metal-rich. The star was observed by SuperWASP, an organization searching for exoplanets, starting in 2009; manual follow-up observations using WASP-44's spectrum and measurements of its radial velocity led to the discovery of the transiting planet WASP-44b. The planet and its star were presented along with WASP-45b and WASP-46b on May 17, 2011 by a team of scientists testing the idea that hot Jupiters tend to have circular orbits, an assumption that is made when the orbital eccentricity of such planets are not well-constrained.

== Observational history ==
WASP-44 was observed between July and November 2009 by WASP-South, a station of the SuperWASP planet-searching program based at the South African Astronomical Observatory. Observations of the star revealed a periodic decrease in its brightness. WASP-South, along with the SuperWASP-North station at the Roque de los Muchachos Observatory on the Canary Islands, collected 15,755 photometric observations, allowing scientists to produce a more accurate light curve. Another set of observations yielded a 6,000 point photometric data set, but the light curve was prepared late and was not considered in the discovery paper.

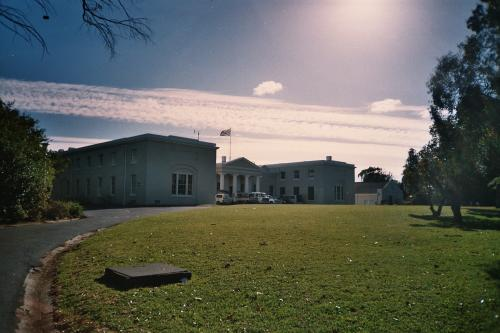
The South African Astronomical Observatory, base of the WASP-South station, where WASP-44 was first observed

In 2010, a European science team investigated the star using the CORALIE spectrograph and collected seventeen spectra of WASP-44. From the spectra, radial velocity measurements were extrapolated. Analysis of collected CORALIE data ruled out the possibility that the detected radial velocity was caused by the blended spectrum of a spectroscopic binary star, supporting the possibility that the body orbiting WASP-44 was indeed a planet, designated WASP-44b.

The Leonhard Euler Telescope at La Silla Observatory in Chile was used to follow up on the planet circling WASP-44, searching for a point at which the planet transited, or crossed in front of, its host star. One transit was detected.

WASP-44, its recently discovered planet, the planets orbiting WASP-45 and WASP-46, and a discussion exploring the validity of the common assumption amongst scientists that closely orbiting hot Jupiter planets have highly circular orbits unless proven otherwise, were reported in a single discovery paper that was published on May 17, 2011 by the Royal Astronomical Society. The paper was submitted to the Monthly Notices of the Royal Astronomical Society on May 16, 2011.

== Characteristics ==
WASP-44 is a G-type star (the same class of star as the Sun) that is located in the Cetus constellation. WASP-44 has a mass that is 0.951 times that of the Sun. In terms of size, WASP-44 has a radius that is 0.927 times that of the Sun. WASP-44 has an effective temperature of 5410 K (cooler than the Sun). However, the star is metal-rich with relation to the Sun. Its measured metallicity is [Fe/H] = 0.06, or 1.148 times that the amount of iron found in the Sun. WASP-44's chromosphere (outermost layer) is not active. The star also does not rotate at a high velocity.

The star has an apparent magnitude of 12.9. It cannot be seen from Earth with the naked eye.

== Planetary system ==
There is one known planet in the orbit of WASP-44: WASP-44b. The planet is a hot Jupiter with a mass of 0.889 times that of Jupiter. Its radius is 1.14 times that of Jupiter. WASP-44b orbits its host star every 2.4238039 days at a distance of 0.03473 AU, approximately 3.47% the mean distance between the Earth and Sun. With an orbital inclination of 86.02º, WASP-44b has an orbit that exists almost edge-on to its host star with respect to Earth. WASP-44b's orbital eccentricity is fit to 0.036, indicating a mostly circular orbit. An analysis of transit timing variations to search for additional planets was negative.

The WASP-44 planetary system
Companion (in order from star)	Mass	Semimajor axis (AU)	Orbital period (days)	Eccentricity	Inclination (°)	Radius
b	0.860+0.072 −0.068 M_{J}	0.03474+0.00040 −0.00043	2.4238133(23)	0.039+0.047 −0.028	85.98+0.39 −0.35	1.127+0.035 −0.034 R_{J}
