= Nu Lupi =

The Bayer designation Nu Lupi (ν Lup / ν Lupi) is shared by two stars, in the constellation Lupus:

- ν^{1} Lupi
- ν^{2} Lupi
