= WASP-44b =

Exoplanet in the constellation Cetus

Discovery
- Discovered by: Anderson et al.
- Discovery site: La Silla Observatory
- Discovery date: Published 16 May 2011
- Detection method: Doppler spectroscopy

Orbital characteristics
- Epoch J2000
- Semi-major axis: 0.03473 (± 0.00041) AU
- Orbital period (sidereal): 2.423807±0.000003 d
- Inclination: 86.02 ^{+1.11}_{−0.86}
- Star: WASP-44

Physical characteristics
- Mean radius: 1.002 (± 0.11) R_{J}
- Mass: 0.889 (± 0.062) M_{J}
- Mean density: 0.61 ^{+0.23}_{−0.15} g cm^{−3}
- Temperature: 1343 (± 64)

WASP-44b is a closely orbiting Jupiter-sized planet found in the orbit of the sunlike star WASP-44 by the SuperWASP program, which searches for transiting planets that cross in front of their host stars as seen from Earth. After follow-up observations using radial velocity, the planet was confirmed. Use of another telescope at the same observatory detected WASP-44 transiting its star. The planet completes an orbit around its star every two and a half days, and orbits at roughly 0.03 AU from its host star. WASP-44b's discovery was reported by the Royal Astronomical Society in May 2011.

== Discovery ==
Using the WASP-South station at the South African Astronomical Observatory, the SuperWASP project searched the night sky for potential planets that transited, or crossed in front of, their host stars at a roughly periodic rate. WASP-44 was among the candidates identified as a possible host to a transit event. WASP-44's reclassification as a potential planetary host came about after WASP-South scanned the constellation Cetus between July and November 2009. In combination with later observations using both WASP-South and the SuperWASP-North in the Canary Islands, over 15,755 photometric measurements were collected. A later set of observations between August and November 2010 produced a 6,000 point photometric data set, but the light curve was prepared late and was not considered in the discovery paper. The star was observed at the same time as stars WASP-45 and WASP-46.

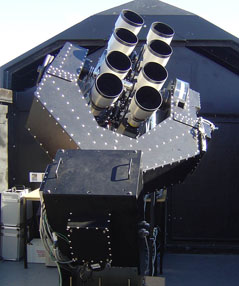
The WASP-South cameras in South Africa

In 2010, the European team of astronomers used the CORALIE spectrograph on the 1.2m Leonhard Euler Telescope at Chile's La Silla Observatory. The same radial velocity measurements detected by SuperWASP were detected. The planet WASP-44b was confirmed after analysis of the results ruled out spectroscopic binary stars, leaving a transiting planet as the most likely cause of the radial velocity variations.

The Euler telescope was used to observe WASP-44b as it transited its host star. For 4.2 hours on September 14, 2010, Euler observed WASP-44 in search of a slight dimming in brightness until a more precise light curve could be found. Accounting for all data yet collected, analysis yielded the planet's characteristics.

The discovery of WASP-44b, along with those of WASP-45b and WASP-46b, were reported on May 16, 2011 by the Royal Astronomical Society. The scientists who worked on the paper discussed the role of orbital eccentricity, or how elliptical an orbit is, and how poorly constrained it tends to be amongst Hot Jupiters, where a circular orbit is assumed. They used the three newly discovered planets as studies into the creation of a non-eccentric, circular model for a planet's orbit (the most likely solution) or an eccentric, elliptical solution for a planet's orbit (the solution that, according to the discovery team, required less of an assumption).

== Host star ==
WASP-44 is a sunlike G-type star in the constellation Cetus. WASP-44 has a mass of 0.951 solar masses and a radius of 0.927 solar radii, which means that WASP-44 is 95% the mass of and 92% the size of the Sun. With an effective temperature of 5410 K, WASP-44 is cooler than the Sun, although it is richer in iron, with a measured metallicity of [Fe/H] = 0.06 (1.15 times the amount of iron found in the Sun). The star is an estimated 900 million years old, although this age is uncertain, as error bars are large. Based on its spectrum, WASP-44 is not active in its chromosphere (outer layer). The star was also not found to demonstrate a high rate of rotation.

With an apparent magnitude of 12.9, WASP-44 cannot be seen with the unaided eye from Earth.

== Characteristics ==
WASP-44b is a Hot Jupiter with a mass of 0.889 times Jupiter's mass and a radius of 1.002 times that of Jupiter. Although less massive than Jupiter, the planet is bloated to a greater size because its proximity to its host star heats it, a common effect in such closely orbiting gas giants. WASP-44b orbits at a mean distance of 0.03473 AU, which is about 3% of the distance between the Earth and Sun. An orbit is completed every 2.4238039 days (58.171 hours).

WASP-44b has an orbital inclination of 86.02º, which is almost edge-on as seen from Earth.
