= Kepler-32 =

Star in the constellation Cygnus

Observation data Epoch J2000 Equinox ICRS
- Constellation: Cygnus
- Right ascension: 19^{h} 51^{m} 22.1744^{s}
- Declination: +46° 34′ 27.391″
- Apparent magnitude (V): 16.0

Characteristics
- Evolutionary stage: Main sequence
- Spectral type: M1V

Astrometry
Proper motion (μ)	RA: −13.762(31) mas/yr Dec.: 19.586(32) mas/yr
Parallax (π)	3.0960±0.0276 mas
Distance	1,053 ± 9 ly (323 ± 3 pc)

Details
Mass	0.58±0.05 M_{☉}
Radius	0.53±0.04 R_{☉}
Surface gravity (log g)	4.64 cgs
Temperature	3900±200 K
Metallicity [Fe/H]	0.00 dex
Rotation	36.220±0.256 days

Other designations
- KIC 9787239, KOI-952, 2MASS J19512217+4634273, Gaia DR2 2080287892525359872

Database references
SIMBAD	data
Exoplanet Archive	data
KIC	data

Kepler-32 is a red dwarf star located about 1053 light-years from Earth, in the constellation of Cygnus. Five-planet system discovered in January 2012 by the Kepler spacecraft, it shows a 0.58 ± 0.05 solar mass (M_{☉}), a 0.53 ± 0.04 solar radius (R_{☉}), and temperature of 3900.0 K, making it half the mass and radius of the Sun, two-thirds its temperature and 5% its luminosity.

== Planetary system ==
In 2011, two planets around star and two more suspected. Kepler-32b with an orbital period of 5.91 days, and Kepler-32c with an orbital period of 8.76 days. In 2012, transit-timing variation analysis confirmed three other planets to be in the system. However, only very loose constraints of the maximum mass of the planets could be determined. In 2014, the dynamical simulation shown what the Kepler-32 planetary system have likely undergone a substantial inward migration in the past, producing an observed pattern of lower-mass planets on tightest orbits. Additional yet unobserved gas giant planets on wider orbit are likely necessary for migration of smaller planets to proceed that far inward, although current planetary systems would be unstable if additional planets are located closer than 8.7 AU from the parent star.

The Kepler-32 planetary system
Companion (in order from star)	Mass	Semimajor axis (AU)	Orbital period (days)	Eccentricity	Inclination (°)	Radius
f	—	0.013	0.742956	—	—	0.81±0.05 R_{🜨}
e	—	0.033	2.896009	—	—	1.5±0.1 R_{🜨}
b	0.011 M_{J}	0.05	5.90124	—	—	2.2±0.2 R_{🜨}
c	0.012 M_{J}	0.09	8.7522	—	—	2.0±0.2 R_{🜨}
d	—	0.129	22.780806	—	—	2.7±0.1 R_{🜨}
