= CoRoT-16 =

Faint star in the constellation Scutum

Observation data Epoch J2000 Equinox ICRS
- Constellation: Scutum
- Right ascension: 18^{h} 34^{m} 05.919^{s}
- Declination: −06° 00′ 09.24″
- Apparent magnitude (V): 16.03±0.43

Characteristics
- Evolutionary stage: main sequence
- Spectral type: G5 V
- B−V color index: +1.82

Astrometry
Proper motion (μ)	RA: +1.036 mas/yr Dec.: −8.080 mas/yr
Parallax (π)	1.3007±0.0442 mas
Distance	2,510 ± 90 ly (770 ± 30 pc)

Details
Mass	1.098+0.082 −0.078 M_{☉}
Radius	1.19+0.14 −0.13 R_{☉}
Luminosity	0.77 L_{☉}
Surface gravity (log g)	4.36±0.10 cgs
Temperature	5,650±100 K
Metallicity [Fe/H]	0.19±0.06 dex
Rotational velocity (v sin i)	0.50±0.50 km/s
Age	6.7±2.8 Gyr

Other designations
- Gaia DR3 4256135160951556480

Database references
SIMBAD	data
Exoplanet Archive	data

CoRoT-16 is a solitary star located in the equatorial constellation Scutum. With an apparent magnitude of 16, it requires a powerful telescope to be seen, and is located 2,400 light years away based on parallax.

== Properties ==
This is an ordinary G-type main sequence star with a similar mass to the Sun, but is 19% larger than the latter. It radiates at 77% the Sun's luminosity from its photosphere at an effective temperature of 5,650 K, which gives it the yellow-hue of a G-type star. CoRoT-16 has a rotation rate of 1/2 km/s, which correlates with an age of 6.7 billion years. As expected with planetary hosts, CoRoT-16 has a high metallicity.

== Planetary system ==
In 2011, the CoRoT mission discovered an unusually eccentric "hot Jupiter".

The planetary system
Companion (in order from star)	Mass	Semimajor axis (AU)	Orbital period (days)	Eccentricity	Inclination (°)	Radius
b	0.529+0.098 −0.096 M_{J}	0.0618 ± 0.0015	5.35227±0.00020	0.37+0.11 −0.12	85.01+0.94 −1.20	1.17+0.14 −0.16 R_{J}
