= CoRoT-23 =

Star in Serpens

Observation data Epoch J2000.0 Equinox ICRS
- Constellation: Serpens
- Right ascension: 18^{h} 39^{m} 07.8405^{s}
- Declination: +04° 21′ 28.034″
- Apparent magnitude (V): 15.63

Characteristics
- Evolutionary stage: main sequence star
- Spectral type: G0V
- Variable type: planetary transit

Astrometry
Proper motion (μ)	RA: -2.390 mas/yr Dec.: -8.306 mas/yr
Parallax (π)	0.9569±0.0329 mas
Distance	3,400 ± 100 ly (1,050 ± 40 pc)

Details
Mass	1.14 ± 0.08 M_{☉}
Radius	1.61 ± 0.18 R_{☉}
Surface gravity (log g)	4.3 ± 0.2 cgs
Temperature	5900 ± 100 K
Metallicity [Fe/H]	0.05 ± 0.1 dex
Rotation	9.2 ± 1.5 d
Rotational velocity (v sin i)	9.0 ± 1 km/s
Age	7.2+1 −1.5 Gyr

Other designations
- 2MASS J18390782+0421281

Database references
SIMBAD	data

CoRoT-23 is a main-sequence star located in the constellation Serpens at a distance of about 1956 light-years from the Earth. At least one planet revolves around the star.

== Characteristics ==
CoRoT-23 is a yellow dwarf main sequence star similar to the Sun. Its solar mass is 1.098 and its solar radius is 0.86. The surface temperature is about 5900 kelvin.

== Planetary system ==
One planet has been discovered orbiting CoRoT-23, CoRoT-23b.

The planet may be in an unstable orbit and subject to merger with the host star in the future.

The CoRoT-23 planetary system
Companion (in order from star)	Mass	Semimajor axis (AU)	Orbital period (days)	Eccentricity	Inclination (°)	Radius
b	2.8 M_{J}	0.0477	3.6314	0.16	—	—
