= Kepler-23c =

Hot Neptune

Discovery
- Discovered by: Eric B. Ford et al.
- Discovery date: 25 January 2012
- Detection method: Transit method

Orbital characteristics
- Semi-major axis: 0.099 AU (14,800,000 km)
- Eccentricity: 0.02+0.39 −0.02
- Orbital period (sidereal): 10.742434(39) d
- Star: Kepler-23

Physical characteristics
- Mean radius: 3.12 ± 0.10 R_{🜨}
- Mass: 0.189+0.033 −0.036 M_{J}

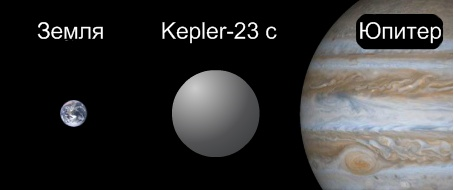
Comparative sizes of Earth, Kepler-23 c and Jupiter.

Kepler-23c is a Neptune-sized exoplanet orbiting the star Kepler-23, located in the constellation Cygnus. The planet is 3.12 times wider than the Earth and is 0.189 Jupiter masses. The planet was discovered using data taken from the Kepler space telescope. It is likely a gas giant. The planets Kepler-23b and d both reside in the same planetary system.
