= Kepler-33b =

Short-orbit exoplanet

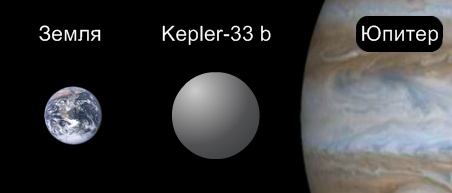
- The size of Kepler-33b as compared to Earth and Jupiter

Discovery
- Discovered by: Jack Lissauer
- Discovery site: Moffett Field, California
- Discovery date: January 26, 2012
- Detection method: Transit

Designations
- Alternative names: KOI-707.05

Orbital characteristics
- Semi-major axis: 0.0677±0.0014 AU
- Eccentricity: 0
- Orbital period (sidereal): 5.66793±0.00012 d
- Inclination: 86.39±1.17°
- Longitude of periastron: 90°
- Time of periastron: 2454964.8981±0.0075 jd

Physical characteristics
- Mean radius: 0.16±0.02 R_{J}
- Surface gravity: 3.6g

Kepler-33b is an extrasolar planet orbiting Kepler-33 in the constellation Cygnus. It is one of five planets orbiting Kepler-33.

== Discovery ==
Kepler-33b was, along with twenty-six other planets in eleven different planetary systems, confirmed to be a planet on January 26, 2012.

== The Kepler-33 system ==
Kepler-33b orbits its host star with 4 other planets. All five planets orbit its star closer than Mercury does to the Sun. Of those five, Kepler-33b is closest. All Kepler-33 planets are too close to be in the habitable zone.

== See also ==
- List of planets discovered by the Kepler spacecraft
