= Kepler-17 =

Star in the constellation Cygnus

Observation data Epoch J2000 Equinox ICRS
- Constellation: Cygnus
- Right ascension: 19^{h} 53^{m} 34.8643^{s}
- Declination: +47° 48′ 54.050″
- Apparent magnitude (V): 14.0

Characteristics
- Evolutionary stage: main sequence
- Spectral type: G2V

Astrometry
Radial velocity (R_{v})	−25.82±4.64 km/s
Proper motion (μ)	RA: −3.811(17) mas/yr Dec.: −6.339(19) mas/yr
Parallax (π)	1.4115±0.0151 mas
Distance	2,310 ± 20 ly (708 ± 8 pc)

Details
Mass	1.16±0.06 M_{☉}
Radius	1.05±0.03 R_{☉}
Surface gravity (log g)	4.53±0.12 cgs
Temperature	5781±85 K
Metallicity [Fe/H]	0.26±0.10 dex
Rotation	12.159±0.029 days or 11.6±0.1 days
Rotational velocity (v sin i)	4.277±0.04 km/s
Age	3.0±1.6 Gyr

Other designations
- Kepler-17, KOI-203, KIC 10619192, TOI-5794, TIC 273874849, 2MASS J19533486+4748540

Database references
SIMBAD	data
Exoplanet Archive	data
KIC	data

Kepler-17 is a main-sequence yellow dwarf star about 2,310 light-years (710 parsecs) away in the constellation Cygnus. It is much more active than the Sun, with starspots covering roughly 6% of its surface. Starspots are long-lived, with at least one persisting for 1400 days.

== Planetary system ==
Kepler-17 is known to host one hot Jupiter exoplanet, Kepler-17b, in orbit around it. It was discovered by the Kepler mission using the transit method in 2011. Its orbit is aligned with the host star's equator.

The Kepler-17 planetary system
Companion (in order from star)	Mass	Semimajor axis (AU)	Orbital period (days)	Eccentricity	Inclination (°)	Radius
b	2.47+0.12 −0.11 M_{J}	0.02680+0.00046 −0.00048	1.48571091(21)	<0.020	87.22±0.15	1.33±0.04 R_{J}
