= Kepler-23 =

Star in the constellation Cygnus

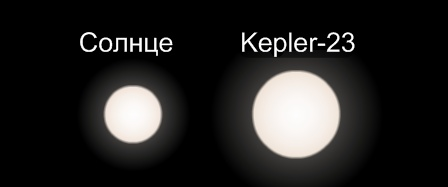
- Kepler-23 compared to the Sun

Observation data Epoch J2000 Equinox ICRS
- Constellation: Cygnus
- Right ascension: 19^{h} 36^{m} 52.5355^{s}
- Declination: +49° 28′ 45.253″
- Apparent magnitude (V): 13.547

Characteristics
- Evolutionary stage: subgiant
- Spectral type: G2V

Astrometry
Radial velocity (R_{v})	−26.97±2.38 km/s
Proper motion (μ)	RA: 2.275(12) mas/yr Dec.: 3.879(14) mas/yr
Parallax (π)	1.1395±0.0101 mas
Distance	2,860 ± 30 ly (878 ± 8 pc)

Details
Mass	1.078±0.077 M_{☉}
Radius	1.548±0.048 R_{☉}
Luminosity	~2.3 L_{☉}
Surface gravity (log g)	4.00±0.14 cgs
Temperature	5828±100 K
Metallicity [Fe/H]	−0.09±0.14 dex
Age	4-8 Gyr

Other designations
- KOI-168, KIC 11512246, GSC 03564-01806, 2MASS J19365254+4928452, Gaia DR2 2135019107451751168

Database references
SIMBAD	data
Exoplanet Archive	data
KIC	data

Kepler-23 is a G-type main-sequence star about 2,860 light-years (880 parsecs) away in the northern constellation of Cygnus, the swan. With an apparent visual magnitude of 13.5, it is too faint to be seen with the naked eye. This star is similar in mass and temperature to the Sun, but is larger and more luminous. Kepler-23 is orbited by three known exoplanets.

== Planetary system ==
Three transiting exoplanets orbit this star, discovered using the Kepler space telescope. Two planets, Kepler-23b and Kepler-23c, were discovered in 2011 and were confirmed in 2012. A third planet, Kepler-23d, was confirmed in 2014 as part of a study validating hundreds of Kepler candidates. All three planets are between Earth and Neptune in size (sub-Neptunes), and their masses have been measured via transit-timing variations, showing that they have lower densities than Earth.

The Kepler-23 planetary system
Companion (in order from star)	Mass	Semimajor axis (AU)	Orbital period (days)	Eccentricity	Inclination (°)	Radius
b	2.56+0.43 −0.40 M_{🜨}	0.075	7.106995(73)	0.017+0.019 −0.014	—	1.638±0.047 R_{🜨}
c	7.81+1.32 −1.20 M_{🜨}	0.099	10.742434(39)	0.021+0.009 −0.014	—	3.005±0.074 R_{🜨}
d	4.44+1.30 −1.21 M_{🜨}	0.124	15.27429(17)	0.010+0.014 −0.008	—	2.206±0.057 R_{🜨}
