= Kepler-12 =

Star in the constellation Draco

Observation data Epoch J2000 Equinox J2000
- Constellation: Draco
- Right ascension: 19^{h} 04^{m} 58.4221^{s}
- Declination: +50° 02′ 25.272″
- Apparent magnitude (V): 13.4

Characteristics
- Evolutionary stage: main sequence
- Spectral type: G0

Astrometry
| Proper motion (μ) | RA: 3.070(11) mas/yr Dec.: 3.211(11) mas/yr |
| Parallax (π) | 1.1351±0.0093 mas |
| Distance | 2,870 ± 20 ly (881 ± 7 pc) |

Details
| Mass | 1.166±0.054 M_{☉} |
| Radius | 1.483±0.029 R_{☉} |
| Temperature | 5947±100 K |
| Metallicity [Fe/H] | 0.07 (± 0.04) dex |
| Rotational velocity (v sin i) | 2.7±0.5 km/s |
| Age | 4.0±0.4 Gyr |

Other designations
- KOI-20, KIC 11804465, GSC 03549-00844, 2MASS J19045842+5002253

Database references
| SIMBAD | data |
| KIC | data |

Kepler-12 is an early G-type to late F-type star with a transiting planet Kepler-12b in a 4-day orbit. The star lies within the constellation Draco and is located approximately 881 parsecs (2,870 light-years) away from Earth.

== Characteristics ==
Kepler-12, known also as KIC 11804465 in the Kepler Input Catalog, is an early G-type to late F-type star, about 4 billion years old. This corresponds strongly with a sunlike dwarf star nearing the end of the main sequence, which is about to become a red giant. Kepler-12 is located approximately 881 parsecs (2,870 light-years) away from Earth. The star also has an apparent magnitude of 13.438, which means that it cannot be seen from Earth with the unaided eye.

The star is slightly more massive, slightly more iron-rich and slightly hotter than the Sun. However, Kepler-12 is larger, with a radius of 1.483 times the Sun's radius.

== Planetary system ==
The only currently known planet, b, is a hot Jupiter with a radius 1.7 times that of Jupiter but less than half the mass. It exhibits a pronounced radius anomaly, being significantly larger than predicted by standard models of planetary evolution for its level of stellar irradiation and mass. This suggests additional mechanisms contribute to its inflated radius, such as lower heavy-element content or internal heat sources.

The Kepler-12 planetary system
| Companion (in order from star) | Mass | Semimajor axis (AU) | Orbital period (days) | Eccentricity | Inclination | Radius |
|---|---|---|---|---|---|---|
| b | 0.432+0.053 −0.051 M_{J} | 0.0553+0.0010 −0.0012 | 4.4379637±0.0000002 | 0 | 88.796+0.088 −0.074° | 1.754+0.031 −0.036 R_{J} |
