= WASP-48 =

G-type main-sequence star

Observation data Epoch J2000 Equinox ICRS
- Constellation: Cygnus
- Right ascension: 19^{h} 24^{m} 38.9614^{s}
- Declination: +55° 28′ 23.332″
- Apparent magnitude (V): 11.65±0.14

Characteristics
- Evolutionary stage: main sequence
- Spectral type: G0V

Astrometry
Radial velocity (R_{v})	−19.47±0.65 km/s
Proper motion (μ)	RA: +6.210 mas/yr Dec.: −28.007 mas/yr
Parallax (π)	2.1639±0.0104 mas
Distance	1,507 ± 7 ly (462 ± 2 pc)

Details
Mass	1.09±0.08 M_{☉}
Radius	1.09±0.14 R_{☉}
Luminosity	3.8 L_{☉}
Surface gravity (log g)	4.03±0.03 cgs
Temperature	6,000±150 K
Metallicity	−0.12±0.12
Rotation	7.2±0.5 d
Rotational velocity (v sin i)	12.2±0.7 km/s
Age	7.9^{+2.0}_{−1.6} Gyr

Other designations
- TOI-1628, TIC 284475976, WASP-48, TYC 3925-739-1, GSC 03925-00739, 2MASS J19243895+5528233

Database references
SIMBAD	data
Exoplanet Archive	data

WASP-48 is a G-type main-sequence star about 1,500 light-years away in the constellation Cygnus. The star is likely older than the Sun and slightly depleted in heavy elements. It shows an infrared excess noise of unknown origin, yet has no detectable ultraviolet emissions associated with starspot activity. The discrepancy may be due to large interstellar absorption of light in interstellar medium for WASP-48. The measurements are compounded by the emission from eclipsing contact binary NSVS-3071474 projected on sky plane nearby, although no true stellar companions were detected by survey in 2015.

The star is rotating rapidly, being spun up by the tides raised by the giant planet on close orbit.

== Planetary system ==
In 2011 a transiting hot Jupiter planet, WASP-48b, was detected.

The WASP-48 planetary system
Companion (in order from star)	Mass	Semimajor axis (AU)	Orbital period (days)	Eccentricity	Inclination (°)	Radius
b	0.98±0.09 M_{J}	0.03444±0.00043	2.143634±0.000003	0	80.09^{+0.69}_{−0.55}	1.67±0.08 R_{J}
