= Mouhoun =

Mouhoun may refer to:

- Mouhoun Province, a province of Burkina Faso
- Mouhoun River or Black Volta, a river flowing through Burkina Faso
- The proper name of the star HD 30856
