= CoRoT-16b =

Extrasolar planet in the constellation Scutum

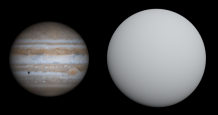
- CoRoT-16 compared to Jupiter

Discovery
- Discovered by: Ollivier et al.
- Discovery site: CoRoT space telescope
- Discovery date: 10 June 2011
- Detection method: Transit

Orbital characteristics
- Apastron: 0.0847 AU (12,670,000 km)
- Periastron: 0.0389 AU (5,820,000 km)
- Semi-major axis: 0.0618 ± 0.0015 AU (9,250,000 ± 220,000 km)
- Eccentricity: 0.37+0.11 −0.12
- Orbital period (sidereal): 5.35227±0.00020 d
- Inclination: 85.01°+0.94° −1.20°
- Time of periastron: 2,454,923.9145±0.0022 JD
- Argument of periastron: 161°+33° −29°
- Semi-amplitude: 62.6+11.0 −9.9 km/s
- Star: CoRoT-16

Physical characteristics
- Mean radius: 1.17+0.14 −0.16 R_{J}
- Mass: 0.529+0.098 −0.096 M_{J}
- Mean density: 0.41+0.22 −0.14 g/cm^{3}
- Temperature: 1,086 K (813 °C; 1,495 °F)

CoRoT-16b is a transiting exoplanet orbiting the G or K type main sequence star CoRoT-16 2,433 light years away in the southern constellation Scutum. The planet was discovered in June 2011 by the French-led CoRoT mission. CoRoT-16b was detected using the transit method, which measures the brightness changes during an eclipse. However, this planet has an eccentric orbit, which is unusual due to CoRoT-16b's proximity to its parent star and the age.

Due to its orbit, CoRoT-16b is classified as a "hot Jupiter". It only takes about 5 days to orbit CoRoT-16, but has an unusually eccentric orbit. CoRoT-16b has 52.9% the mass of Jupiter, but is 17% larger than the latter. Due to the low mass and high radius, CoRoT-16b has 41% the density of water; the orbit gives it an equilibrium temperature of 1,086 K. However, this is only an estimate due to the eccentricity of CoRoT-16b.
