= Kepler-12b =

Exoplanet in the constellation Draco

Discovery
- Discovered by: Fortney et al.
- Discovery site: Kepler spacecraft
- Discovery date: Published September 5, 2011
- Detection method: radial velocity/transit

Orbital characteristics
- Semi-major axis: 0.0556 (± 0.0007) AU
- Eccentricity: 0.01
- Orbital period (sidereal): 4.4379637 (± 0.0007) d
- Inclination: 88.76 (±0.08)
- Star: Kepler-12

Physical characteristics
- Mean radius: 1.695 ^{+0.028}_{−0.032} R_{J}
- Mass: 0.431 (± 0.041) M_{J}
- Mean density: 0.111 ^{+0.011}_{−0.009} g cm^{−3}
- Temperature: 1711±223 K.

Kepler-12b is a hot Jupiter that orbits G-type star Kepler-12 some 900 parsecs (2,900 ly) away. The planet has an anomalously large radius that could not be explained by standard models at the time of its discovery, almost 1.7 times Jupiter's size while being 0.4 times Jupiter's mass. The planet was detected by the Kepler spacecraft, a NASA project searching for planets that transit (cross in front of) their host stars. The discovery paper was published on September 5, 2011.

== Discovery ==
NASA's Kepler spacecraft continuously observes a region of the night sky, searching for signs of transiting planets. While orbiting their host stars, such transiting planets cross in front of host stars as seen from Earth. The slight and periodic dimming in the star's brightness is used to determine whether or not the dimming was caused by a planet and not by a false positive. Analysis of Kepler's early data yielded evidence of a transit signal around a star designated as KIC 11804465, later known as Kepler-12. The transit signal was designated KOI-20.

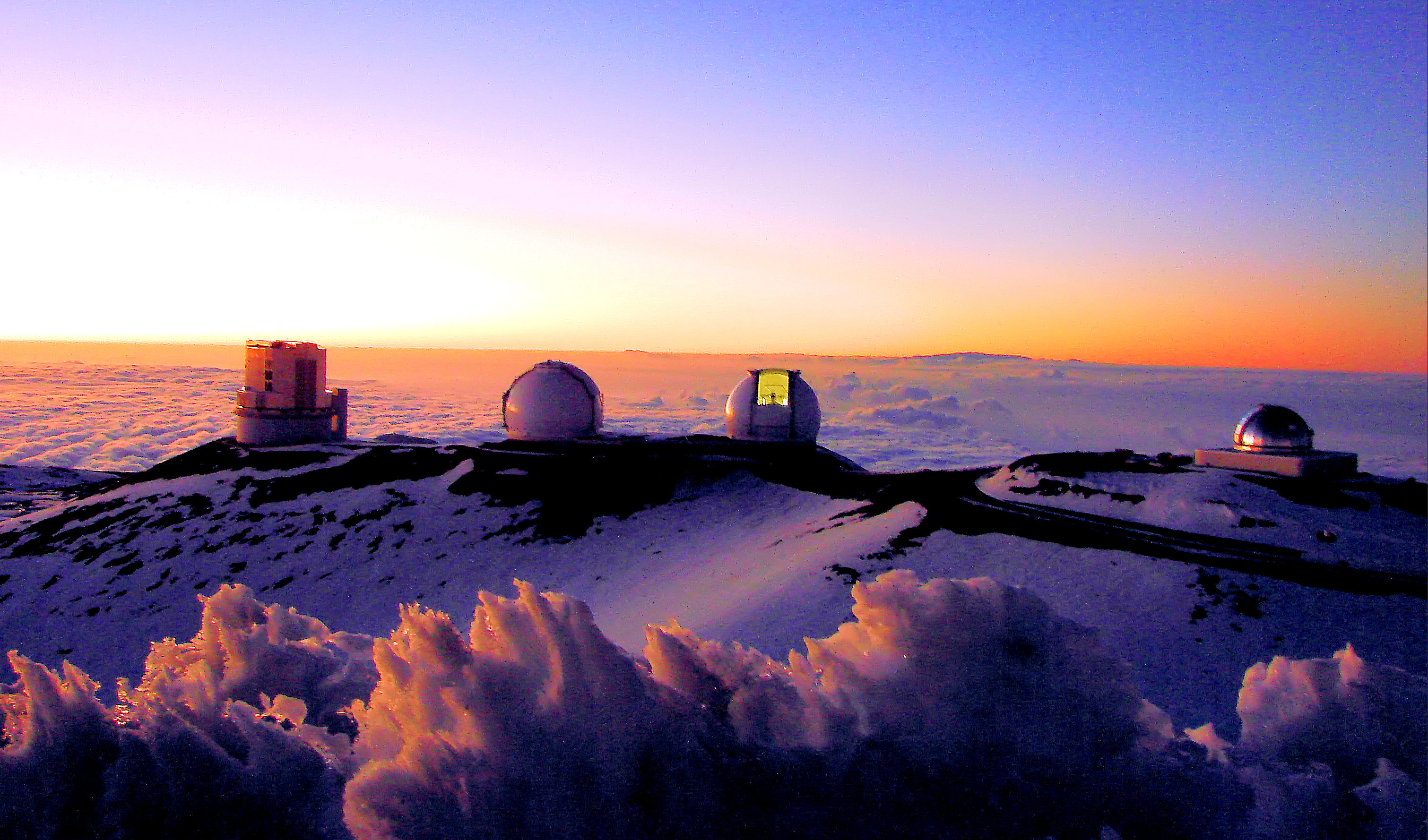
The Keck Observatory collected observations to prove that Kepler-12b's signal was not actually caused by an eclipsing binary.

The Kepler Follow-up Program (KFOP) worked to verify the existence of the planet. KFOP used the W.M. Keck Observatory's Keck I telescope to prove that Kepler-12 was not an eclipsing binary star (a possible false positive that mimics the transit signal). The WIYN Observatory, which was used for speckle imaging, supported Keck's findings and verified that the signal caused by KOI-20 was not caused by a nearby background star's interference. Adaptive optics imaging in the near-infrared was obtained on September 9, 2009 with the Palomar Observatory's PHARO camera on the Hale Telescope confirmed both the WIYN and Keck findings.

Keck's HIRES instrument measured Kepler-12's radial velocity, which was used to find more of Kepler-12's characteristics (and, by extension, deduce the characteristics of KOI-20 itself). The radial velocity measurements eventually led to the confirmation of Kepler-12b as a planet. Kepler's data in its first 1.5 years of operation was processed and analyzed, yielding Kepler-12b's radius, mass and density.

The Spitzer Space Telescope's IRAC infrared adaptive optics camera was used to carry out program #60028, which observed the occultations by several giant planets detected by Kepler behind their host stars. The Kepler team, using the observations, tentatively concluded that Kepler-12b most likely did not experience a temperature inversion, in which the day-side temperature of the planet is lower than the night-side. Kepler-12b's discovery paper was published in the Astrophysical Journal on September 5, 2011.

== Host star ==
Kepler-12, known also as KIC 11804465 in the Kepler Input Catalog, is an early G-type to late F-type star. This corresponds strongly with a sunlike dwarf star nearing the end of the main sequence, and is about to become a red giant. Kepler-12 is located approximately 900 parsecs (2,950 light years) away from Earth. The star also has an apparent magnitude of 13.438, which means that it cannot be seen from Earth with the unaided eye.

The star is slightly more massive, slightly more iron-rich and slightly hotter than the Sun. However, Kepler-12 is larger, with a radius of 1.483 times the Sun's radius.

== Characteristics ==
Kepler-12b is a Hot Jupiter, and (at the time of its discovery) was the least-irradiated of four Hot Jupiters experiencing a radius anomaly of approximately 1.7 times or more the mass of Jupiter. This radius anomaly entails Hot Jupiters experiencing massive radius increases for a reason not explained by scientific models. Although Kepler-12 is the least-irradiated of the four Hot Jupiters, its radius is just as large, suggesting that multiple mechanisms influencing the planet's inflation are at work. Kepler-12b was compared to HD 209458 b in its discovery paper because both planets appear to release similar amounts of energy (flux); it was also compared to TrES-4b because of the similar radius of the planet.

Kepler-12b has a mass of 0.431 Jupiters. Its radius of 1.695 Jupiter radii, however, indicates that the planet is almost 70% more than the size of Jupiter. With an orbit of 0.0556 AU, Kepler-12b's average orbit is approximately 5% the average distance between the Earth and Sun. The orbit lasts 4.4379637 days. Kepler-12b has an orbital inclination of 88.86º, indicating that the planet is seen as nearly edge-on with respect to the Earth and to its host star. According to Kepler's official website, the mass and radius of the planet can be compared to 137 Earths (in mass) and 19 Earths (for its radius). The planet's density is 0.111 grams/cm^{3}, about a tenth of the density of water, and its equilibrium temperature is 1481 K (some 5.8 times greater than Jupiter's equilibrium temperature). Additionally, Kepler-12b has an almost totally circular orbit, with an orbital eccentricity of less than 0.01.

The planet is likely to be tidally locked to the parent star. In 2015, the planetary nightside temperature was estimated to be equal to 1711±223 K. The brightest spot in the planetary atmosphere is shifted westward from the substellar point, indicating a strong winds.
