= Kepler-32b =

Extrasolar planet orbiting the star Kepler 32 in the constellation Cygnus

Discovery
- Discovery date: 2013
- Detection method: Transit (Kepler Mission)

Orbital characteristics
- Semi-major axis: 0.0519 AU (7,760,000 km)
- Orbital period (sidereal): 5.9012 d
- Inclination: 87.660
- Star: Kepler-32

Physical characteristics
- Mean radius: 2.2 R_{🜨}
- Temperature: 569

Kepler-32b (alt. name KOI 952.01) is an extrasolar planet in orbit around its M-dwarf-type star in the Kepler-32 system, constellation of Cygnus. Discovered by planetary transit methods with the Kepler space telescope in January 2012, it presents a semi-major axis of 0.0519 AU and temperature of 559.9 K. 2.2 Earth-radius, a mass of 4.1 M_{J}, and an orbital period of 5.9012 days.

== See also ==
- List of planets discovered by the Kepler spacecraft
