= WASP-48b =

Hot Jupiter

Orbital characteristics
- Semi-major axis: 0.03444 AU (5,152,000 km)
- Orbital period (sidereal): 2.14363592±0.0000046 d
- Inclination: 80.09 ^{+0.55}_{−0.55}
- Star: WASP-48

Physical characteristics
- Mean radius: 1.485 ± 0.052R_{J}
- Mass: 0.984±0.085 M_{J}
- Temperature: 2300

WASP-48b is an extrasolar planet orbiting the star WASP-48 in the constellation Cygnus. The planet was detected using the transit method by the SuperWASP team, which published its discovery in 2011. It orbits its host star in just 2.14 days with a semi-major axis of 0.034 AU and has an equilibrium temperature of 1956±54 K. The dayside temperature was measured to be around 2300 K in 2018.

The planetary atmosphere transmission spectrum is gray and featureless, having no noticeable Rayleigh scattering.
