= Nu1 Lupi =

Star in the constellation Lupus

Nu^{1} Lupi
- Location of ν^{1} Lupi (circled in red)

Observation data Epoch J2000.0 Equinox J2000.0 (ICRS)
- Constellation: Lupus
- Right ascension: 15^{h} 22^{m} 08.27124^{s}
- Declination: −47° 55′ 40.0543″
- Apparent magnitude (V): 5.01

Characteristics
- Spectral type: F6 III-IV
- U−B color index: +0.04
- B−V color index: +0.50

Astrometry
Proper motion (μ)	RA: −141.19 mas/yr Dec.: −132.92 mas/yr
Parallax (π)	27.89±0.33 mas
Distance	117 ± 1 ly (35.9 ± 0.4 pc)
Absolute magnitude (M_{V})	+2.32

Details
Mass	1.67 M_{☉}
Surface gravity (log g)	3.87±0.10 cgs
Temperature	6,447±80 K
Metallicity [Fe/H]	0.17±0.05 dex
Rotational velocity (v sin i)	2.8±0.2 km/s
Age	2.0 Gyr

Other designations
- ν^{1} Lup, CD−47°9922, FK5 3211, HD 136351, HIP 75206, HR 5698, SAO 225703

Database references
SIMBAD	data

Nu^{1} Lupi (ν^{1} Lup) is a solitary star in the southern constellation of Lupus. It is visible to the naked eye with an apparent visual magnitude of 5.01. It is a high proper motion star with an annual parallax shift of 27.89 mas as seen from Earth, yielding a distance estimate of 117 light years from the Sun.

This is a two billion year old evolved star with a stellar classification of F6 III-IV, indicating that the spectrum has characteristics intermediate between a subgiant and giant star. It is most likely the source of X-ray emission detected at these coordinates with a luminosity of 1.09×10^{29} erg s^{−1}. The star has an estimated 1.67 times the mass of the Sun and is spinning slowly with a projected rotational velocity of 2.8 km/s.

== See also ==
- Nu^{2} Lupi
