= Kepler-32c =

Extrasolar planet orbiting the star Kepler 32 in the constellation Cygnus

Discovery
- Discovery date: 2013
- Detection method: Transit (Kepler Mission)

Orbital characteristics
- Semi-major axis: 0.09 AU (13,000,000 km)
- Orbital period (sidereal): 8.7522 d
- Star: Kepler-32

Physical characteristics
- Mean radius: 3.7 R_{🜨}
- Temperature: 417.3K

Kepler-32c (alt. name KOI 952.02) is an extrasolar planet in orbit around its M-dwarf-type star in the Kepler-32 system, in the constellation of Cygnus. Discovered by planetary transit methods with the Kepler space telescope in January 2012, it presents a semi-major axis of 0.033 AU and temperature of 417.3 K. It has a radius of 2.2 Earth-radius and an orbital period of 8.7522 days.

== See also ==
- List of planets discovered by the Kepler spacecraft
