= HIP 57274 =

K-type main-sequence star

Observation data Epoch J2000 Equinox ICRS
- Constellation: Ursa Major
- Right ascension: 11^{h} 44^{m} 40.9643^{s}
- Declination: +30° 57′ 33.451″
- Apparent magnitude (V): 8.96

Characteristics
- Spectral type: K5 V
- U−B color index: +1.06
- B−V color index: +1.111±0.016

Astrometry
Radial velocity (R_{v})	+29.76±0.35 km/s
Proper motion (μ)	RA: −27.069±0.081 mas/yr Dec.: −381.708±0.079 mas/yr
Parallax (π)	38.6381±0.0499 mas
Distance	84.4 ± 0.1 ly (25.88 ± 0.03 pc)
Absolute magnitude (M_{V})	6.89

Details
Mass	0.73±0.05 M_{☉}
Radius	0.68±0.03 R_{☉}
Luminosity	0.19±0.01 L_{☉}
Surface gravity (log g)	4.71±0.1 cgs
Temperature	4,640±100 K
Metallicity [Fe/H]	+0.09±0.05 dex
Rotation	45 d
Rotational velocity (v sin i)	0.5±0.5 km/s
Age	7.87±5 Gyr

Other designations
- BD+31°2290, GJ 439, HIP 57274, SAO 62684, LTT 13227, 2MASS J11444095+3057339, Gaia DR2 4021079911593673600

Database references
SIMBAD	data
Exoplanet Archive	data
ARICNS	data

HIP 57274 is a star in the northern circumpolar constellation of Ursa Major with a system of three planets. It is invisible to the naked eye, having an apparent visual magnitude of 8.96. The distance to this system is 84.4 light years based on stellar parallax, and it is drifting further away with a radial velocity of +30 km/s. The star has a relatively high rate of proper motion, traversing the celestial sphere at the rate of 0.382 arcsecond/year.

This is an ordinary K-type main-sequence star with a stellar classification of K5V. It appears to be older than the Sun with an age of roughly eight billion years and is spinning slowly with a projected rotational velocity of under 1 km/s. The star has 73% of the mass of the Sun and 68% of the Sun's radius. The abundance of elements heavier than helium is about the same or slightly higher than in the Sun. The star is radiating just 19% of the luminosity of the Sun from its photosphere at an effective temperature of 4,640 K.

== Planetary system ==
The three exoplanets orbiting HIP 57274 were discovered by the radial velocity method in 2011, all of them having mass significantly greater than the Earth. A 2014 search for planetary transits was unsuccessful. The planetary orbits are possibly highly variable, being strongly affected by mean motion resonances. The most stable region for a hypothetical super-earth within the star's habitable zone would be an orbit inside 0.37–0.56 AU from the host star.

The HIP 57274 planetary system
Companion (in order from star)	Mass	Semimajor axis (AU)	Orbital period (days)	Eccentricity	Inclination (°)	Radius
b	≥11.6±1.3 M_{🜨}	0.0713±0.00163	8.1352±0.004	0.187±0.10	—	—
c	≥0.41±0.01 M_{J}	0.1778±0.0041	32.03±0.02	0.05±0.02	—	—
d	≥0.53±0.03 M_{J}	1.007±0.027	431.7±8.5	0.27±0.05	—	—
