= Kepler-28 =

Star in the constellation Cygnus

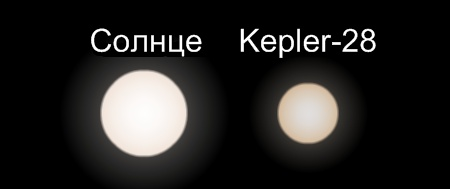
- Kepler-28 compared to the Sun

Observation data Epoch J2000 Equinox ICRS
- Constellation: Cygnus
- Right ascension: 19^{h} 28^{m} 32.8905^{s}
- Declination: +42° 25′ 45.959″
- Apparent magnitude (V): 15.036

Characteristics
- Evolutionary stage: main sequence
- Spectral type: M0V

Astrometry
Radial velocity (R_{v})	−26.99±6.00 km/s
Proper motion (μ)	RA: −0.463(21) mas/yr Dec.: 11.691(21) mas/yr
Parallax (π)	2.2537±0.0185 mas
Distance	1,450 ± 10 ly (444 ± 4 pc)

Details
Mass	0.684±0.026 M_{☉}
Radius	0.664±0.013 R_{☉}
Luminosity	0.16 L_{☉}
Temperature	4499±75 K
Metallicity [Fe/H]	−0.17±0.11 dex
Rotation	17.951±0.016 days
Rotational velocity (v sin i)	0.6 km/s
Age	2.0 Gyr

Other designations
- KOI-870, KIC 6949607, 2MASS J19283288+4225459

Database references
SIMBAD	data
KIC	data

Kepler-28 is an M-type main-sequence star about 1,450 light-years (440 parsecs) away in the northern constellation of Cygnus. With an apparent visual magnitude of 15.036, this star is too faint to be seen with the naked eye. It is orbited by two exoplanets.

== Planetary system ==
The two transiting planets of Kepler-28 were discovered in 2011 using the Kepler space telescope, and were confirmed in early 2012. They are both warm sub-Neptune gas planets. The planetary parameters were updated in 2023, with lower values for all of mass, radius, and density compared to previous estimates.

The Kepler-28 planetary system
Companion (in order from star)	Mass	Semimajor axis (AU)	Orbital period (days)	Eccentricity	Inclination (°)	Radius
b	1.63+0.51 −0.40 M_{🜨}	0.062	5.91213(17)	<0.08	—	1.959+0.043 −0.042 R_{🜨}
c	2.06+0.70 −0.52 M_{🜨}	0.081	8.98597(27)	0.017+0.023 −0.014	—	1.857±0.042 R_{🜨}
