= Kepler-27 =

G-type star in the constellation Cygnus

Observation data Epoch J2000 Equinox J2000
- Constellation: Cygnus
- Right ascension: 19^{h} 28^{m} 56.81962^{s}
- Declination: +41° 05′ 09.1405″
- Apparent magnitude (V): 15.855

Characteristics
- Evolutionary stage: subgiant
- Spectral type: K2 III-IV

Astrometry
Proper motion (μ)	RA: 2.171±0.033 mas/yr Dec.: −0.324±0.031 mas/yr
Parallax (π)	0.9298±0.0281 mas
Distance	3,500 ± 100 ly (1,080 ± 30 pc)

Details
Mass	0.9^{+0.03}_{−0.10} M_{☉}
Radius	0.850^{+0.017}_{−0.016} R_{☉}
Luminosity	0.45 L_{☉}
Surface gravity (log g)	4.58 cgs
Temperature	5,249^{+68}_{−56} K
Metallicity [Fe/H]	0.250^{+0.064}_{−0.061} dex
Rotation	14.7 days
Rotational velocity (v sin i)	0.6±5.0 km/s
Age	1.620^{+0.978}_{−0.466} Gyr

Other designations
- KOI-841, KIC 5792202, 2MASS J19285682+4105091, Gaia DR2 2053586321364864640

Database references
SIMBAD	data
Exoplanet Archive	data
KIC	data

Kepler-27 is a star in the northern constellation of Cygnus, the swan. It is located at the celestial coordinates: Right Ascension 19^{h} 28^{m} 56.81962^{s}, Declination +41° 05′ 09.1405″. With an apparent visual magnitude of 15.855, this star is too faint to be seen with the naked eye. In 2024, Kepler-27 was discovered to be a binary star with a red dwarf companion 1.975 arcseconds away.

== Planetary system ==
The planetary system of Kepler-27 comprising two small gas giants was discovered in late 2011. The planets Kepler-27b and Kepler-27c have equilibrium temperatures of 610 K and 481 K, respectively. In 2021, a third, sub-Neptune-sized planet was confirmed, orbiting closer in than the other two planets.

The Kepler-27 planetary system
Companion (in order from star)	Mass	Semimajor axis (AU)	Orbital period (days)	Eccentricity	Inclination (°)	Radius
d	—	0.070 (Note: Derived from known mass of star and orbital period of planet.)	6.54629	—	—	0.2414 R_{J}
b	0.1320±0.018 M_{J}	0.118	15.3348	—	—	0.522±0.024 R_{J}
c	0.0670±0.011 M_{J}	0.191	31.3309	—	—	0.640±0.029 R_{J}
