= HD 156279 =

Star in the constellation Draco

Observation data Epoch J2000 Equinox J2000
- Constellation: Draco
- Right ascension: 17^{h} 12^{m} 23.204816^{s}
- Declination: +63° 21′ 07.531205″
- Apparent magnitude (V): 8.167±0.013

Characteristics
- Evolutionary stage: main-sequence
- Spectral type: K0 or G6
- Apparent magnitude (R): 7.60
- Apparent magnitude (G): 7.8657
- Apparent magnitude (J): 6.677±0.018
- B−V color index: 0.801±0.014

Astrometry
Radial velocity (R_{v})	−20.144±0.161 km/s
Proper motion (μ)	RA: −1.879±0.024 mas/yr Dec.: 160.429±0.027 mas/yr
Parallax (π)	27.6756±0.0200 mas
Distance	117.85 ± 0.09 ly (36.13 ± 0.03 pc)
Absolute magnitude (M_{V})	5.25

Details
Mass	0.999+0.046 −0.045 M_{☉}
Radius	0.94±0.02 R_{☉}
Luminosity	0.70±0.01 L_{☉}
Surface gravity (log g)	4.45±0.03 cgs
Temperature	5,449±31 K
Metallicity [Fe/H]	0.14±0.01 dex
Rotational velocity (v sin i)	2.51±1 km/s
Age	7.4±2.2 Gyr

Other designations
- BD+63 1335, Gaia DR2 1631084478574318976, HD 156279, HIP 84171, SAO 17390, PPM 20265, NLTT 44404, TYC 4202-656-1, 2MASS J17122319+6321074

Database references
SIMBAD	data

HD 156279 is a star with a pair of orbiting exoplanets located in the northern constellation of Draco. It has various alternate designations, including HIP 84171 and BD+63 1335. Parallax measurements yield a distance of 118 light years from the Sun, but it is drifting closer with a radial velocity of −20 km/s. Despite an absolute magnitude of 5.25, at that distance the star is too faint to be visible to the naked eye with an apparent visual magnitude of 8.17. It is presumed to be a single star, as in 2019 all imaging surveys have failed to find any stellar companions.

The spectrum of HD 156279 has a stellar classification of G6 or K0, depending on the study. Hence it presents as an ordinary main sequence star of the late G-type or early K-type. The star has 93% of the mass of the Sun and 94% of the Sun's radius. HD 156279 is roughly seven billion years old and is spinning with a projected rotational velocity of 2.5 km/s. Based on the abundance of iron, this star is slightly enriched in heavy elements, having 140% of the solar abundance. It is radiating 70% of the luminosity of the Sun from its photosphere at an effective temperature of 5,449 K.

== Planetary system ==
Orbiting HD 156279 are two superjovian planets, the inner HD 156279 b (discovered in 2011) and outer HD 156279 c (discovered in 2016). In 2022, the inclination and true mass of HD 156279 c were measured for the first time, using the astrometry technique.

The HD 156279 planetary system
Companion (in order from star)	Mass	Semimajor axis (AU)	Orbital period (years)	Eccentricity	Inclination	Radius
b	≥ 9.82±0.29 M_{J}	0.5126+0.0077 −0.0078	0.365235(10)	0.6479+0.00070 −0.00077	—	—
c	10.53+0.65 −0.59 M_{J}	5.570+0.086 −0.084	13.093±0.081	0.2602+0.0047 −0.0048	110.9+6.9 −9.4°	—
