= Kepler-17b =

Super Jupiter orbiting Kepler-17

Discovery
- Discovered by: Aldo S. Bonomo et al.
- Discovery date: 25 October 2011
- Detection method: Transit method

Orbital characteristics
- Semi-major axis: 0.0268 ± 0.0005 AU (4,009,000 ± 75,000 km)
- Orbital period (sidereal): 1.4857108 ± 0.0000002 d
- Inclination: 87.22 ± 0.15
- Star: Kepler-17

Physical characteristics
- Mean radius: 1.33 ± 0.04 R_{J}
- Mass: 2.47 ± 0.10 M_{J}
- Mean density: 1.30 ± 0.14 g/cm^{3} (0.0470 ± 0.0051 lb/cu in)
- Surface gravity: 3.54 ± 0.03 m/s^{2} (11.614 ± 0.098 ft/s^{2})
- Temperature: 2229^{+50}_{−58} K.

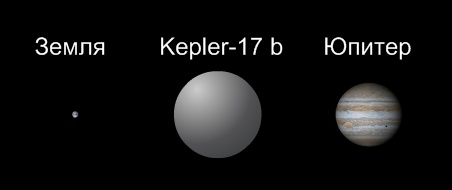
Kepler-17b's size relative to Earth (left) and Jupiter (right)

Kepler-17b is a planet in the orbit of star Kepler-17, first observed by the Kepler spacecraft observatory in 2011. Kepler-17b is a gas giant nearly 2.45 times the mass of Jupiter, and is sometimes described as a "super-Jupiter". The planet is likely to be tidally locked to the parent star. In 2015, the planetary nightside temperature was estimated to be equal to 2229^{+50}_{−58} K.

The study in 2012, utilizing a Rossiter–McLaughlin effect, have determined the planetary orbit is probably aligned with the equatorial plane of the star, misalignment equal to 0±15°.
