= UZ Fornacis =

Binary star system in the constellation Fornax

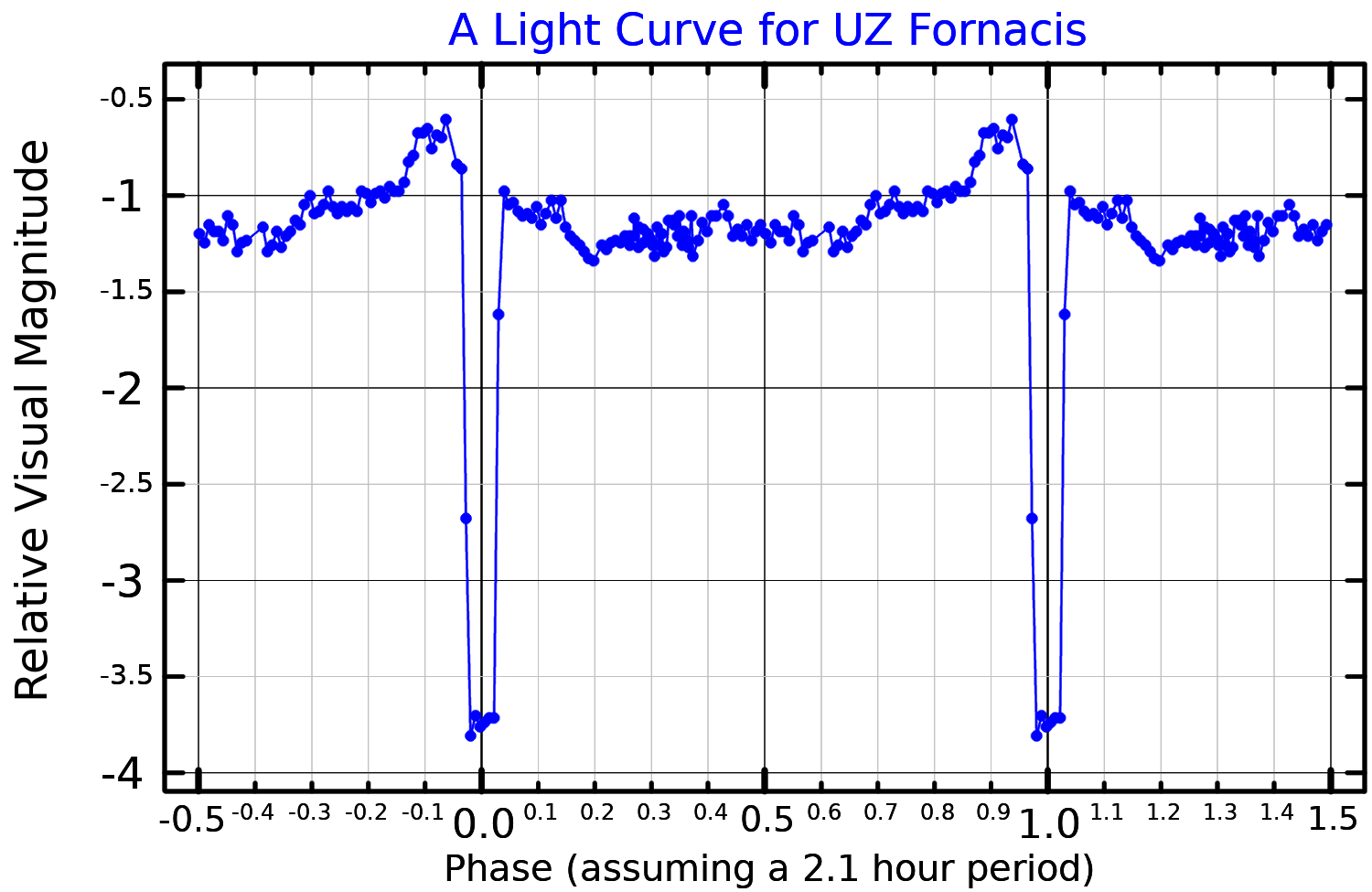
- A visual band light curve for UZ Fornacis, adapted from Dai et al. (2010)

Observation data Epoch J2000 Equinox ICRS
- Constellation: Fornax
- Right ascension: 03^{h} 35^{m} 28.65156^{s}
- Declination: −25° 44′ 21.7656″
- Apparent magnitude (V): 17.0 - 20.5

Characteristics
- Spectral type: D + M4.5V
- Variable type: AM Her + eclipses

Astrometry
Radial velocity (R_{v})	150 km/s
Proper motion (μ)	RA: 18.137 mas/yr Dec.: −1.470 mas/yr
Parallax (π)	4.1736±0.0742 mas
Distance	780 ± 10 ly (240 ± 4 pc)

Orbit
Period (P)	0.087865437 d (126.526229 min)
Semi-major axis (a)	3.67×10^{−3} AU (5.49×10^{5} km)
Inclination (i)	81°

Details

White dwarf
Mass	0.71 M_{☉}
Radius	0.011 R_{☉}

M dwarf
Mass	0.14 M_{☉}
Radius	0.20 R_{☉}

Other designations
- EXO 033319-2554.2

Database references
SIMBAD	data

UZ Fornacis (abbreviated as UZ For) is a binary star in the constellation of Fornax. It appears exceedingly faint with a maximum apparent magnitude 17.0. Its distance, as measured by Gaia using the parallax method, is about 780 light-years (240 parsecs).

The system consists of two stars, a white dwarf and a red dwarf, in close orbit around each other. It is hypothesized that there are also two planets orbiting the central stars.

== Nomenclature ==
The system is most commonly referred to as UZ Fornacis, which is its variable star designation. The General Catalogue of Variable Stars describes it as "E+XM", meaning it is an eclipsing binary system consisting of a low-mass star with an X-ray-emitting companion. In the past the system has also been referred to using the designation EXO 033319–2554.2, which refers to its coordinates on the celestial sphere, as well as the EXOSAT satellite that detected it.

== Overview ==
UZ Fornacis is a cataclysmic variable. The two stars, a white dwarf and red dwarf, orbit each other every 127 minutes. The stars' orbit is inclined about 81 degrees away from the plane-of-sky, so the system eclipses. The eclipsing nature of this system was first discovered in 1987. At the time, it was the 14th AM Herculis star known and only the third system known to eclipse.

In systems like UZ Fornacis, matter is siphoned off the red dwarf and towards the white dwarf. However, unlike typical cataclysmic variable where this matter forms an accretion disk, the white dwarf is highly magnetic and has a strong magnetic field. This magnetic field channels the matter into loops that eventually accrete onto the white dwarf. When this happens, the matter emits cyclotron radiation and soft X-rays. Due to the activity of the red dwarf, sometimes more mass gets transferred and X-ray flare-ups occur.

Matter flows onto a spot on the white dwarf, at a rate of 1×10^{−4} to 1 grams per square centimeter per second. The white dwarf's magnetism also locks its rotation so it matches the orbit.

== Variability ==
The brightness of UZ Fornacis varies rapidly and somewhat unpredictably. The two stars in the system eclipse each other regularly. The eclipses last for about 380 s, with the initial drop in brightness and return to maximum brightness each taking about 3 s. The eclipse light curves do not all have the same shape, some being more or less flat-bottomed while others show a smooth variation in brightness, and some are asymmetrical. The times of the eclipses vary, possibly due to substellar companions. Outside of the eclipses, the brightness varies during the orbit depending on the visibility of an accretion spot on the white dwarf.

The brightness also varies over a period of years due to differences in the rate of accretion onto the white dwarf from the red dwarf. This can generally be seen as a bright state and a faint state, although the magnitudes of each state vary. For example, UZ Fornacis has been observed between magnitudes 15.9 and 16.75 at different times in the bright state. The system also shows rapid "flickering" on a timescale of minutes, common in cataclysmic variable systems.

== Possible planetary system ==
Investigations in 2010 and 2011 found that the orbital period of the two stars in UZ Fornacis varied cyclically. Researchers attributed this to two possible gas giant sized planets around the two stars, perturbing their orbits and causing the orbital period to vary.

As of 2019, there is not enough information to explain all of the period variations, since the planets would have to be in eccentric orbits to fit the data, and that would cause the orbits to be dynamically unstable. It is possible that there are even more planets causing additional perturbation, or some physical effect such as the Applegate mechanism is responsible for the eclipse timing variations.

The UZ Fornacis planetary system
Companion (in order from star)	Mass	Semimajor axis (AU)	Orbital period (days)	Eccentricity	Inclination (°)	Radius
c	10.00 M_{J}	5.7	5355	0.69	—	—
d (unconfirmed)	3.22 M_{J}	3.0	2124	0.45	—	—
