= Kepler-21 =

Star in the constellation Lyra

Observation data Epoch J2000 Equinox ICRS
- Constellation: Lyra
- Right ascension: 19^{h} 09^{m} 26.8350^{s}
- Declination: +38° 42′ 50.456″
- Apparent magnitude (V): 8.25

Characteristics
- Evolutionary stage: subgiant
- Spectral type: F6 IV
- Apparent magnitude (J): 7.229±0.032
- Apparent magnitude (H): 7.031±0.023
- Apparent magnitude (K): 6.945±0.018
- Variable type: Planetary transit variable

Astrometry
Radial velocity (R_{v})	−18.174±0.005 km/s
Proper motion (μ)	RA: 28.093(18) mas/yr Dec.: 28.546(20) mas/yr
Parallax (π)	9.2181±0.0173 mas
Distance	353.8 ± 0.7 ly (108.5 ± 0.2 pc)
Absolute magnitude (M_{V})	2.99

Position (relative to Kepler-21A)
Component	Kepler-21B
Epoch of observation	2014
Angular distance	0.7671(62)″
Position angle	129.74(46)°
Projected separation	87 AU

Details
Mass	1.408+0.021 −0.030 M_{☉}
Radius	1.902+0.018 −0.012 R_{☉}
Luminosity	5.188+0.142 −0.128 L_{☉}
Surface gravity (log g)	4.026±0.004 cgs
Temperature	6,305±50 K
Metallicity [Fe/H]	−0.03±0.10 dex
Rotation	12.62±0.03 d
Rotational velocity (v sin i)	8.4±0.5 km/s
Age	2.60±0.16 Gyr

Other designations
- HD 179070, HIP 94112, KOI-975, KIC 3632418, TYC 3120-963-1, 2MASS J19092683+3842505

Database references
SIMBAD	data

Kepler-21, also known as HD 179070, is a star with a closely orbiting exoplanet in the northern constellation of Lyra. At an apparent visual magnitude of 8.25 this was the brightest star observed by the Kepler spacecraft to host a validated planet until the discovery of an exoplanet orbiting HD 212657 in 2018. This system is located at a distance of 354 light-years (109 parsecs) from the Sun based on parallax measurements, but is drifting closer with a radial velocity of −18.2 km/s.

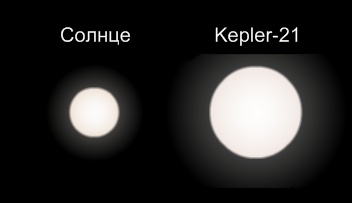
The size of HD 179070 (right) compared to the Sun (left)

The spectrum of HD 179070 presents as an evolving F-type subgiant star with a stellar classification of F6 IV. This suggests the star has exhausted the supply of hydrogen at its core and is evolving into a giant star. It is an estimated 2.6 billion years old and is spinning with a rotation period of 12.6 days. With 1.4 times the mass of the Sun it currently has 1.9 times the Sun's radius. The star is radiating five times the luminosity of the Sun from its photosphere at an effective temperature of 6,305 K.

A faint nearby source was detected in 2011 and determined to be a co-moving stellar companion in 2016. Designated HD 179070 B, it lies at an angular separation of 0.75″ along a position angle of 129° relative to the primary. At the distance of this star, this corresponds to a projected separation of 87 AU. It is possible that this companion star had a significant influence on the exoplanet formation and subsequent orbital evolution.

== Planetary system ==
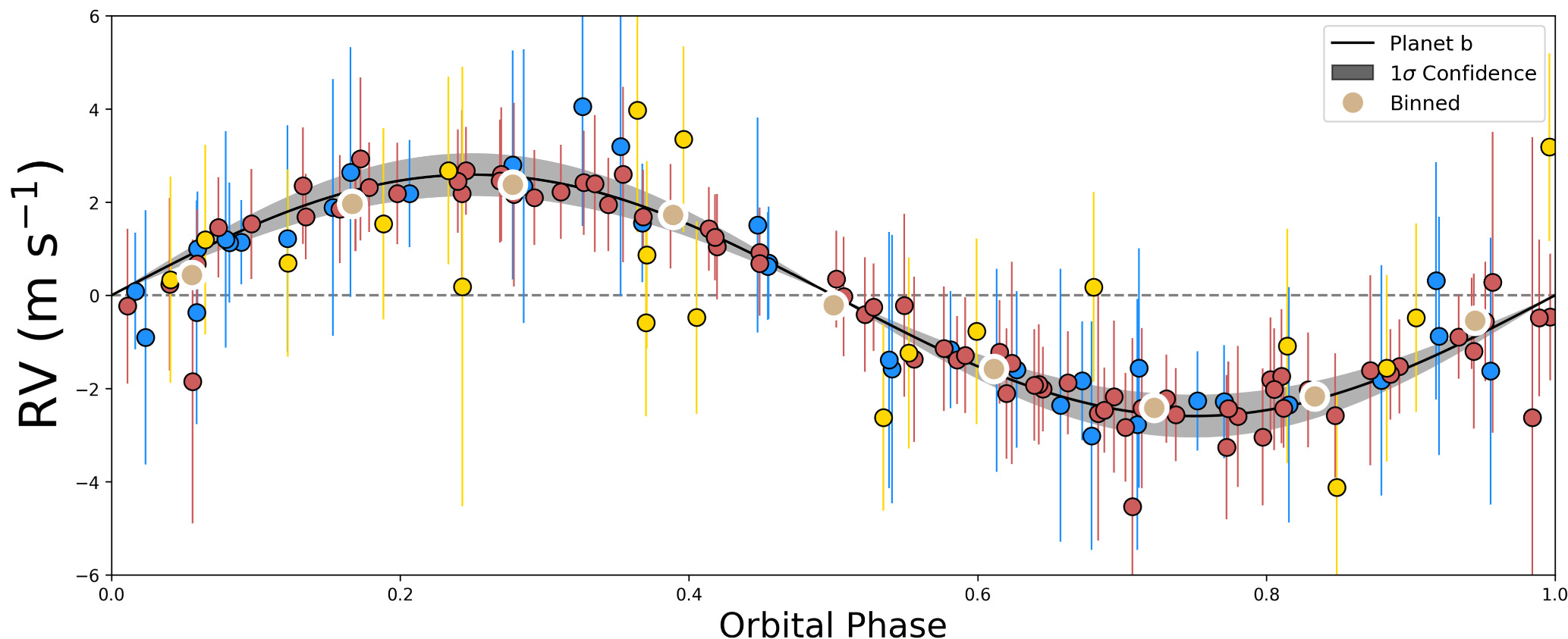
Radial velocity curve of Kepler-21b.

A candidate transiting exoplanet was discovered based on data from the first four months of photometry from the Kepler spacecraft. Confirmation was obtained in 2012 after extensive follow-up observations and analysis of the Kepler light curves.

The calculated density of the planet is approximately 6.4 g·cm^{−3}, similar to Earth's 5.5 g·cm^{−3}, which suggests a rocky composition. With an equilibrium temperature of 2,025 Kelvin, the top few-hundred kilometers of the planet is probably molten.

Calculations of the rate of orbital decay from tidal effects results in a decrease in the orbital period of 3.88 milliseconds per year, since this would be a change of only 4 seconds every thousand years it would be undetectable in any reasonable length of time.

Kepler-21 might have another exoplanet, a gas giant with at least 3.7 times the mass of Jupiter, named Kepler-21c.

The Kepler-21 planetary system
Companion (in order from star)	Mass	Semimajor axis (AU)	Orbital period	Eccentricity	Inclination	Radius
b	7.5±1.3 M_{🜨}	0.0427172(3)	2.7858212(32) d	0.02(10)	83.20°+0.28° −0.26°	1.639+0.019 −0.015 R_{🜨}
c (unconfirmed)	3.7+2.5 −1.3 or 4+2.4 −1.3 M_{J}	–	70.0+52.7 −26.4 or 62.7+49.6 −21.8 yr	–	–	–
