= CoRoT-23b =

Exoplanet

Discovery
- Discovered by: CoRoT space telescope
- Detection method: Transit

Orbital characteristics
- Semi-major axis: 0.0477 AU (7,140,000 km)
- Eccentricity: 0.16
- Orbital period (sidereal): 3.6314 d
- Inclination: 85.7
- Star: CoRoT-23

Physical characteristics
- Mean radius: 1.08 R_{J}
- Mass: 2.8M_{J}
- Temperature: 1509 K

CoRoT-23b is a transiting Hot Jupiter exoplanet found by the CoRoT space telescope in 2011.

== Host star ==
CoRoT-23b orbits CoRoT-23 in the constellation of Serpens. It is a G0V star with an effective temperature of 5,900 K (5,630 °C; 10,160 °F), a mass of 1.14 M_{☉}, a radius of 1.61 R_{☉}, and a near-solar metallicity of 0.05±0.1. (Note: This means that CoRoT-23 is 1.12+0.30 −0.23 times richer in iron than the Sun.) Its age is 6.2 - 8.2 Gyr.

== Orbit ==
The planet may be in an unstable orbit and subject to a merger with the host star in the future.
