= HIP 57274 d =

Exoplanet in the constellation Cetus

Discovery
- Discovered by: Fischer et al.
- Discovery date: 28 December 2011
- Detection method: radial velocity

Orbital characteristics
- Semi-major axis: 1.01 AU (151,000,000 km)
- Eccentricity: 0.27 (± 0.05)
- Orbital period (sidereal): 413.7 (± 8.5) d
- Star: HIP 57274

Physical characteristics
- Mean radius: ~9 R_{🜨}
- Mass: 0.527 (± 0.025) M_{J} (167.5 M_{🜨})
- Temperature: 167 K (−106 °C; −159 °F)

HIP 57274 d is an exoplanet orbiting the K-type main sequence star HIP 57274 about 84.5 light-years (26 parsecs, or nearly 8.022×10^{16} km) from Earth in the constellation Cetus. It orbits within the outer part of its star's habitable zone, at a distance of 1.01 AU. The exoplanet was found by using the radial velocity method, from radial-velocity measurements via observation of Doppler shifts in the spectrum of the planet's parent star.

== Characteristics ==
=== Mass, radius and temperature ===
HIP 57274 d is a gas giant, a planet that has a radius and mass close to that of the gas giants Jupiter and Saturn. It has a temperature of 167 K (−106 °C; −159 °F). It has an estimated mass of around 0.527 M_{J} (167 M_{🜨}), and a potential radius of around 9 R_{🜨} based on its mass, since it is slightly more massive than Saturn.

=== Host star ===
The planet orbits a (K-type) star named HIP 57274, orbited by a total of three planets. The star has a mass of 0.73 M_{☉} and a radius of 0.68 R_{☉}. It has a surface temperature of 4640 K and is 7 billion years old. In comparison, the Sun is about 4.6 billion years old and has a surface temperature of 5778 K.

The star's apparent magnitude, or how bright it appears from Earth's perspective, is 8.96. Therefore, HIP 57274 is too dim to be seen with the naked eye, but can be seen with good binoculars.

=== Orbit ===
HIP 57274 d orbits its star every 432 days at a distance of 1.01 AU. This is very similar to that of Earth's orbital period and distance.

== Habitability ==
HIP 57274 d resides in the outer part of circumstellar habitable zone of the parent star. The exoplanet, with a mass of 0.527 M_{J}, is too massive to be rocky, and because of this the planet itself may not be habitable. Hypothetically, large enough moons, with a sufficient atmosphere and pressure, may be able to support liquid water and potentially life.

For a stable orbit the ratio between the moon's orbital period P_{s} around its primary and that of the primary around its star P_{p} must be < 1/9, e.g. if a planet takes 90 days to orbit its star, the maximum stable orbit for a moon of that planet is less than 10 days. Simulations suggest that a moon with an orbital period less than about 45 to 60 days will remain safely bound to a massive giant planet or brown dwarf that orbits 1 AU from a Sun-like star. In the case of HIP 57274 d, the moon's orbit would have to be roughly 40 days to support a stable orbit.

Tidal effects could also allow the moon to sustain plate tectonics, which would cause volcanic activity to regulate the moon's temperature and create a geodynamo effect which would give the satellite a strong magnetic field.

To support an Earth-like atmosphere for about 4.6 billion years (the age of the Earth), the moon would have to have a Mars-like density and at least a mass of 0.07 M_{🜨}. One way to decrease loss from sputtering is for the moon to have a strong magnetic field that can deflect stellar wind and radiation belts. NASA's Galileo's measurements hints large moons can have magnetic fields; it found that Jupiter's moon Ganymede has its own magnetosphere, even though its mass is only 0.025 M_{🜨}.

== See also ==
- Kepler-90h
- HD 69830 d
- Kepler-47c
