= Nu2 Lupi =

Star in the constellation of Lupus

ν^{2} Lupi
- A star chart of the constellation of Lupus showing the position of ν^{2}

Observation data Epoch J2000 Equinox ICRS
- Constellation: Lupus
- Right ascension: 15^{h} 21^{m} 48.14991^{s}
- Declination: −48° 19′ 03.4699″
- Apparent magnitude (V): 5.65

Characteristics
- Evolutionary stage: Main sequence
- Spectral type: G4V
- U−B color index: 0.05
- B−V color index: 0.639±0.003

Astrometry
Radial velocity (R_{v})	−68.78±0.12 km/s
Proper motion (μ)	RA: −1623.275±0.061 mas/yr Dec.: −275.548±0.072 mas/yr
Parallax (π)	67.8467±0.0601 mas
Distance	48.07 ± 0.04 ly (14.74 ± 0.01 pc)
Absolute magnitude (M_{V})	4.80

Details
Mass	0.83±0.08 M_{☉}
Radius	1.00+0.01 −0.02 R_{☉}
Luminosity	1.00±0.04 L_{☉}
Surface gravity (log g)	4.39±0.11 cgs
Temperature	5664±61 K
Metallicity [Fe/H]	−0.34±0.04 dex
Rotation	23.8±3.1 days
Rotational velocity (v sin i)	2.0±0.5 km/s
Age	11.9+3.1 −2.9 Gyr

Other designations
- ν^{2} Lup, CD−47°9919, GJ 582, HD 136352, HIP 75181, HR 5699, SAO 225697, TOI-2011, TIC 136916387

Database references
SIMBAD	data
Exoplanet Archive	data
ARICNS	data

Nu^{2} Lupi (ν^{2} Lupi) is a 6th magnitude G-type main-sequence star located approximately 48 light-years away in the constellation of Lupus. The physical properties of the star are similar to those of the Sun, though Nu^{2} Lupi is significantly older.

== Properties ==
Nu^{2} Lupi is barely observable with the naked eye in good observing conditions. It lies towards the bottom of Lupus near to the border with Norma and close to the galactic plane.

At over 1.6 arcseconds per year, Nu^{2} Lupi has a particularly large proper motion. This indicates that the star is nearby, which was confirmed by Earth-based parallax measurements during the last century such as that of the Gliese Catalogue of Nearby Stars, measuring 63.1 ± 7.8 milli-arcseconds. The much more accurate space-based Hipparcos parallax of 67.51 ± 0.39 milli-arcseconds gives a distance of 48.3 ± 0.3 light-years, making Nu^{2} Lupi one of the closest G-type main-sequence stars to the Sun. As of 2023, the most precise parallax is 67.8467±0.0601 milli-arcseconds from Gaia DR3, corresponding to a distance of 48.07±0.04 light-years.

Somewhat surprisingly, Nu^{2} Lupi also has a large radial velocity of -68.7 km/s. When combined with its large proper motion, it becomes apparent that the star is moving much faster through the galaxy than the Sun. This indicates that the star is a member of an older, higher-motion stellar population, which is confirmed by the star's position on the Toomre diagram with Nu^{2} Lupi showing kinematics of a thick disk star. This means that Nu^{2} Lupi must be considerably older than the Sun. An asteroseismic analysis of the star derives an age of around 12 billion years, almost 3 times the age of the sun. Nu^{2} Lupi is therefore probably one of the oldest stars in the solar neighbourhood.

== Planetary system ==
The Nu2 Lupi planetary system
Companion (in order from star)	Mass	Semimajor axis (AU)	Orbital period (days)	Eccentricity	Inclination (°)	Radius
b	4.56±0.64 M_{🜨}	0.0963±0.0021	11.577794+0.000023 −0.000025	0.079^{+0.068}_{−0.053}	88.53±0.11	1.57±0.09 R_{🜨}
c	10.89±1.33 M_{🜨}	0.1717±0.0037	27.592076+0.000047 −0.000049	0.037^{+0.039}_{−0.026}	88.580+0.032 −0.033	2.75±0.16 R_{🜨}
d	8.52±1.28 M_{🜨}	0.4243±0.0092	107.1363+0.0019 −0.0024	~0	89.766+0.036 −0.033	2.42±0.15 R_{🜨}
e (unconfirmed)	2.6+8.7 −1.1 M_{J}	8.4+30.3 −6.2	—	—	—	—

On September 12, 2011, three low-mass planets were announced in a preprint, using data from the HARPS spectrograph. These three planets are among about seven dozen planets discovered in September 2011, the most of any month up to that point during the exoplanet era that began in the early 1990s. The confirmation of these planets was published in Astronomy & Astrophysics in 2019. The two inner planets were also detected using the transit method in 2020, allowing a precise determination of their masses and radii. In 2021, planet d was similarly found to transit using observations from CHEOPS, also allowing the determination of mass and radius. Further transit observations with CHEOPS were used to refine the planetary parameters and to search for signs of an exomoon around planet d, although no evidence of a moon was found.

With a mass of about 5 Earth masses, the innermost planet falls into the regime of super-Earths, and was confirmed to be mostly rocky with a density of 7.8 g/cm^{3} in 2020. The outer two planets straddle the boundary between super-Earths and ice giant planets, so they are less likely to have predominantly rocky compositions. The middle planet Nu2 Lupi c with a density of 3.5 g/cm^{3} is expected to have a large gaseous envelope. All three planets orbit within 0.5 AU and are likely too hot to maintain liquid water.

The most recent published observation of this system for debris disks was in 2006 by the Spitzer telescope, searching for an excess of infra-red light that would indicate scattering of starlight by dust or planetesimals; no infra-red excess was detected.

Evidence for an outer giant planet was presented in 2026 with astrometry.

== See also ==
- Nu^{1} Lupi
- List of extrasolar planets detected by radial velocity
- 82 G. Eridani
- Mu Arae
