= Kepler-23b =

Exoplanet

Discovery
- Discovered by: Kepler team
- Discovery date: 30 January 2012
- Detection method: Transit (Kepler Mission)

Orbital characteristics
- Semi-major axis: 0.075 AU (11,200,000 km)
- Orbital period (sidereal): 7.106995 d
- Star: Kepler-23

Physical characteristics
- Mean radius: 1.9 R_{🜨}

Kepler-23b is an exoplanet orbiting Kepler-23, located in the constellation Cygnus. The exoplanet was discovered with the Kepler space telescope in January 2012.

The planet is bigger than Earth, and its orbit is very close to its parent star. Orbital periods are 7.1 days and it presents a semi-major axis 0.099 AU.

== See also ==
- List of planets discovered by the Kepler spacecraft
