= WASP-46 =

Star in the constellation Indus

Observation data Epoch J2000 Equinox ICRS
- Constellation: Indus
- Right ascension: 21^{h} 14^{m} 56.85987^{s}
- Declination: −55° 52′ 18.4581″
- Apparent magnitude (V): 12.9

Characteristics
- Evolutionary stage: main sequence
- Spectral type: G6V

Astrometry
Radial velocity (R_{v})	−3.28±1.62 km/s
Proper motion (μ)	RA: +12.521 mas/yr Dec.: −16.150 mas/yr
Parallax (π)	2.6878±0.0131 mas
Distance	1,213 ± 6 ly (372 ± 2 pc)

Details
Mass	0.828±0.067 M_{☉}
Radius	0.858±0.024 R_{☉}
Surface gravity (log g)	4.489±0.013 cgs
Temperature	5600±150 K
Metallicity [Fe/H]	−0.37±0.13 dex
Rotation	16.0±1.0 d
Rotational velocity (v sin i)	1.9±1.2 km/s
Age	9.6+3.4 −4.2 Gyr

Other designations
- TOI-101, TIC 231663901, WASP-46, GSC 08797-00758, 2MASS J21145687-5552184, DENIS J211456.8-555218

Database references
SIMBAD	data
Exoplanet Archive	data

WASP-46 is a G-type main-sequence star about 1,210 light-years (370 parsecs) away. The star is older than the Sun and is strongly depleted in heavy elements compared to the Sun, having just 45% of the solar abundance. Despite its advanced age, the star is rotating rapidly, being spun up by the tides raised by a giant planet in a close orbit.

The star displays excess ultraviolet emission associated with starspot activity, and is suspected to be surrounded by a dust and debris disk.

== Planetary system ==
In 2011 a transiting hot superjovian planet, WASP-46b, was detected. The planet's equilibrium temperature is 1,636±44 K. The dayside temperature measured in 2014 is much higher at 2,386 K, indicating a very poor heat redistribution across the planet. A re-measurement of the dayside planetary temperature in 2020 resulted in a lower value of 1,870+130
−120 K.

In 2017, a search for transit-timing variations of WASP-46b yielded zero results, thus ruling out existence of additional gas giants in the system. The orbital decay of WASP-46b was also not detected.

The WASP-46 planetary system
Companion (in order from star)	Mass	Semimajor axis (AU)	Orbital period (days)	Eccentricity	Inclination (°)	Radius
b	1.91±0.11 M_{J}	0.02335±0.00063	1.43036763(93)	<0.022	82.80±0.17	1.174±0.033 R_{J}
