= WASP-45 =

K-type main sequence star in the constellation of Sculptor

Observation data Epoch J2000 Equinox ICRS
- Constellation: Sculptor
- Right ascension: 00^{h} 20^{m} 56.99413^{s}
- Declination: −35° 59′ 53.7466″
- Apparent magnitude (V): 11.8

Characteristics
- Evolutionary stage: main sequence
- Spectral type: K2V

Astrometry
Radial velocity (R_{v})	4.71±0.33 km/s
Proper motion (μ)	RA: 52.831 mas/yr Dec.: −46.940 mas/yr
Parallax (π)	4.6520±0.0226 mas
Distance	701 ± 3 ly (215 ± 1 pc)

Details
Mass	0.932+0.045 −0.046 M_{☉}
Radius	0.891±0.013 R_{☉}
Luminosity	0.510±0.013 L_{☉}
Surface gravity (log g)	4.508+0.023 −0.025 cgs
Temperature	5167±29 K
Metallicity [Fe/H]	0.388+0.090 −0.10 dex
Rotational velocity (v sin i)	2.3±0.7 km/s
Age	5.4+4.7 −3.5 Gyr

Other designations
- TOI-229, TIC 120610833, WASP-45, TYC 6996-583-1, GSC 06996-00583, 2MASS J00205699-3559537

Database references
SIMBAD	data
Exoplanet Archive	data

WASP-45 is a K-type main-sequence star about 701 light-years (215 parsecs) away. The star's age cannot be well constrained, but it is probably older than the Sun. Yet WASP-45 is enriched in heavy elements compared to the Sun, having 240% of the solar abundance. WASP-45 has low ultraviolet emission, therefore it is suspected to have a low starspot activity, although chromospheric activity was reported elsewhere.

There is a companion star at a separation of 4.4 arcseconds, corresponding to 929 AU. The companion is estimated to have a mass of 0.157 M_{☉} and a temperature of 3,154 K. Although it shares a similar distance and common proper motion with the primary star, its relative space velocity appears to be high enough that the pair are not gravitationally bound.

== Planetary system ==
In 2011 a transiting hot Jupiter planet, WASP-45b, was detected. The planet equilibrium temperature is 1,170±24 K. No Rayleigh scattering was detected in the planetary atmosphere, implying the existence of hazes or a high cloud deck. Along with WASP-12b and six other hot Jupiters, the planet is one of the most promising targets to search for the phenomenon of orbital decay (i.e, a negative value for $\Delta P / P$ where "P" is orbital period).

The WASP-45 planetary system
Companion (in order from star)	Mass	Semimajor axis (AU)	Orbital period (days)	Eccentricity	Inclination (°)	Radius
b	1.018+0.046 −0.045 M_{J}	0.04089+0.00065 −0.00069	3.1260876(35)	<0.043	84.686±0.098	0.978+0.026 −0.024 R_{J}
