= TOI-700 e =

Earth-size exoplanet in Dorado

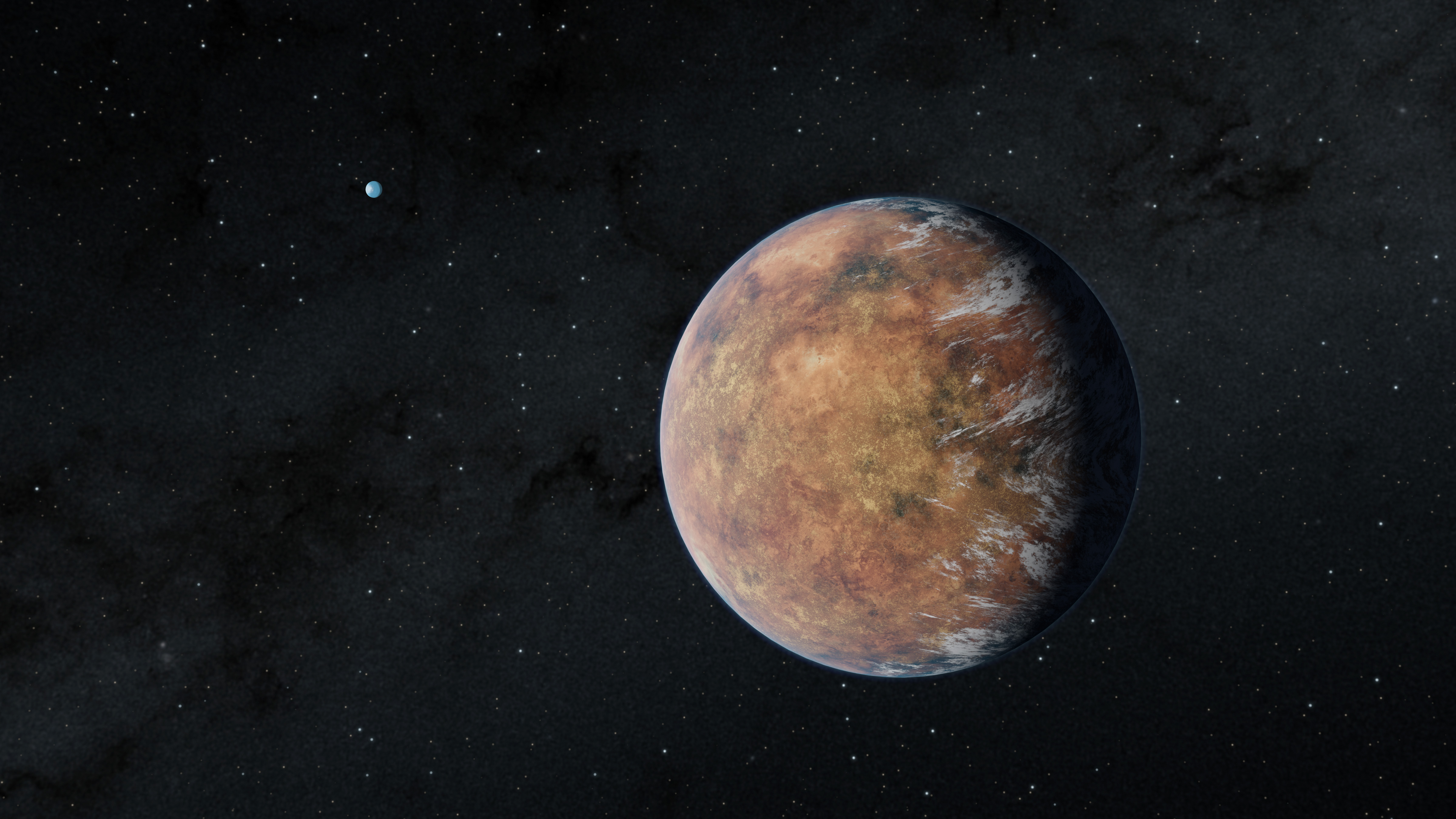
- Artist's view of TOI-700 e. The large blue dot on the top left is TOI-700 d.

Discovery
- Discovered by: Emily Gilbert et al.; TESS
- Discovery date: January 2023
- Detection method: Transit

Orbital characteristics
- Semi-major axis: 0.1340±0.0022 AU
- Eccentricity: 0.059+0.057 −0.042
- Orbital period (sidereal): 27.80978+0.00046 −0.00040 d
- Inclination: 89.60°+0.21° −0.16°
- Star: TOI-700

Physical characteristics
- Mean radius: 0.953+0.089 −0.075 R_{🜨}
- Mass: 0.845+0.67 −0.34 M_{🜨}

TOI-700 e is the second outermost known exoplanet orbiting TOI-700, a red dwarf star in the constellation of Dorado.

== Host star ==
TOI-700 is a red dwarf of spectral class M that is about 40% the mass and radius, and very roughly 50% of the temperature of the Sun. The star is bright with low levels of stellar activity. Over the 11 sectors observed with TESS, the star does not show a single white-light flare. The low rotation rate is also an indicator of low stellar activity.

== Orbit ==
TOI-700 e orbits its host star with an orbital period of 27.8 days, comparable with the Moon's orbital period of 27.5 Earth days. It has an orbital radius of about 0.134 AU (20.0 million km; 12.5 million mi), less than half of that of Mercury to the Sun in the Solar System. It receives about 127% of Earth's sunlight from its host star.

TOI-700 e is in a near 4:3 orbital resonance with TOI-700 d.

== Discovery ==
Size comparison
Earth	TOI-700 e
	Exoplanet

In November 2021, in addition to the three planets already discovered around TOI-700, a fourth possible planet, Earth-sized and receiving approximately 30% more flux from its star than Earth does from the Sun, was found. In January 2023 the existence of this planet, now designated TOI-700 e, was confirmed.

Discovered in 2023, TOI-700 e is terrestrial exoplanet that NASA claims to be an "earth-like" planet, with 95 percent of the Earth’s radius, 81.8% of Earth's mass, and roughly similar temperature. Discovered by NASA's TESS (Transiting Exoplanet Survey Satellite), TOI-700 e takes 27.8 days to orbit once around its star. The planet is at a temperate distance from its star, leading NASA scientists to believe that there is potential for liquid water on its surface. Ten percent smaller than its neighboring planet TOI-700 d, both are at a distance from their sun consistent with habitability, however, TESS requires an additional year to acquire more data about the exoplanets. Being one in only about a dozen habitable zone planets known, further research and data collection of the TOI-700 solar system are important for understanding Earth-like planets.
