= LP 261-75 =

Star system in the constellation Leo Minor

Observation data Epoch J2000.0 Equinox ICRS
- Constellation: Leo Minor
- AC
- Right ascension: 09^{h} 51^{m} 04.5756^{s}
- Declination: +35° 58′ 09.462″
- Apparent magnitude (V): 15.23
- B
- Right ascension: 09^{h} 51^{m} 05.493^{s}
- Declination: +35° 58′ 02.13″

Characteristics

AC
- Evolutionary stage: main sequence + brown dwarf
- Spectral type: M4.5Ve
- Apparent magnitude (J): 10.577±0.021
- Apparent magnitude (H): 9.960±0.019
- Apparent magnitude (K): 9.690±0.019
- Variable type: eclipsing binary

B
- Evolutionary stage: brown dwarf
- Spectral type: L6V FLD-G
- Apparent magnitude (J): 17.225±0.210
- Apparent magnitude (H): 15.895±0.138
- Apparent magnitude (K): 15.138±0.134

Astrometry

AC
Radial velocity (R_{v})	10.2±0.2 km/s
Proper motion (μ)	RA: −100.901±0.022 mas/yr Dec.: −171.575±0.018 mas/yr
Parallax (π)	29.4158±0.0243 mas
Distance	110.88 ± 0.09 ly (34.00 ± 0.03 pc)

B
Proper motion (μ)	RA: −94.0±2.4 mas/yr Dec.: −164.3±2.7 mas/yr
Parallax (π)	29.6±2.8 mas
Distance	110 ± 10 ly (34 ± 3 pc)

Orbit
Primary	A
Name	C
Period (P)	1.88172235+0.00000009 −0.00000010 d
Semi-major axis (a)	14.89±0.10 R_{A}
Eccentricity (e)	<0.007
Inclination (i)	89.83+0.15 −0.19°
Semi-amplitude (K_{1}) (primary)	21.75±0.02 km/s

Position (relative to AC)
Component	B
Epoch of observation	12 January 2006
Angular distance	13.42±0.25″
Position angle	127.5±3.0°
Projected separation	450±120 AU

Details

A
Mass	0.300±0.015 M_{☉}
Radius	0.308±0.005 R_{☉}
Temperature	3138±157 K
Rotation	2.214±0.040 d
Rotational velocity (v sin i)	7.0±0.1 km/s
Age	133+15 −20 Myr

C
Mass	67.4±2.1 M_{Jup}
Radius	0.903+0.015 −0.014 R_{Jup}

B
Mass	15–30 M_{Jup}
Luminosity (bolometric)	10^{−4.43±0.09} L_{☉}
Temperature	1500±150 K
Rotation	4.78±0.95 h

Other designations
- WDS J09511+3558, NLTT 22741
- A: LSPM J0951+3558, TOI-1779, TIC 67646988, 2MASS J09510459+3558098, WISEA J095104.49+355807.6, Gaia DR2 796443724462555904, Gaia DR3 796443724462555904, UCAC2 44308174, USNO‑B1.0 1259‑00179520
- B: TIC 67646986, 2MASS J09510549+3558021, SDSS J095105.44+355801.3
- C: TOI-1779.01

Database references
SIMBAD	A
- B
- C
Exoplanet Archive	data

LP 261‑75 (also known as TOI‑1779) is a triple star system in the constellation Leo Minor. It is composed of the primary red dwarf star, an eclipsing close companion brown dwarf and another brown dwarf in a wide orbit. The inner pair is one of the first red dwarf–brown dwarf systems to have its obliquity measured by the Rossiter–McLaughlin effect, the other being TOI-2119. The system is thought to be a member of the AB Doradus Moving Group.

== Observational history ==
The brown dwarf LP 261‑75 B was discovered during the 2MASS survey on 15 December 1998 and announced in a 2000 discovery paper. Its association with the nearby primary star was first noted five years later after proper motion measurements confirmed that the two objects are co-moving, though confirmation with parallax was not yet available. The wide binary nature of the two objects was confirmed by 2006 by the spectroscopic method, confirming the common distance and young age of 100–200 Ma of the system.

Observations of the brown dwarf LP 261‑75 B obtained by the Hawaii Infrared Parallax Program at the Canada–France–Hawaii Telescope allowed for confirmation of common parallax with the primary. The obtained infrared spectrum was noted to show relatively strong FeH and alkali features, indicating higher gravity otherwise typical of old field brown dwarfs.

The inner transiting companion LP 261‑75 C was discovered by the MEarth transit survey based on observations in June 2017, followed up by confirmation by the spectroscopic method, which also revealed that the companion's mass is consistent with identification as a brown dwarf.

Observations performed at the Gemini North with the MAROON-X instrument during a transit on 17 April 2024 were used to characterize the Rossiter–McLaughlin effect for determination of the obliquity of the primary star with respect to the orbital plane of the inner transiting companion.

== Physical characteristics ==
=== LP 261-75 A ===
LP 261‑75 A is a young red dwarf star. Due to its mass of around 0.3 M_{☉} it is thought to be fully convective.

The spectrum of LP 261‑75 A shows a strong Hα emission feature, indicating strong chromospheric activity typical of young mid-M spectral type stars of ages around 100 Ma. It is also a suspected X-ray source, which can be explained by the expected coronal activity.

The star is rotating rapidly with a ~2.2 day period, which is also a sign of the star's young age based on gyrochronology.

=== LP 261-75 B ===
LP 261‑75 B is a wide orbit brown dwarf companion to the primary star, at a projected separation of 450±120 AU. This separation is larger than the typical maximum separation for such low mass systems, but common for brown dwarf companions to higher mass stars. The young age offers an explanation for the survival of the weakly bound system.

While the mass of the brown dwarf cannot be directly measured without determination of the orbit, an estimation based on the evolutionary tracks is possible based on the assumed age of the primary in the range of 100–200 Ma. The effective temperature of 1500±150 K matching the observed L6 spectral type corresponds to a low-mass brown dwarf in the range of 15–30 M_{J}.

Lightcurve measurements of LP 261‑75 B revealed a most likely rotation period of 4.78±0.95 h with variability of at least ~2.4% across the entire observed infrared wavelength range with a minimal slope and no measurable decrease in the water absorption band, which would be expected to be visible at pressures above bar. This implies that the variations in the lightcurve are likely caused by presence of heterogeneous clouds or hazes present above that altitude. In addition, a strong secondary period of 1.19±0.06 h, close to one third of the main period, was also found in the periodogram, which could be caused by a persistent symmetric pattern of cloud features on each hemisphere.

=== LP 261-75 C ===
The orbital period of LP 261‑75 C is ~1.88 days, which is shorter than the primary's rotational period. Tidal interactions are expected to lead to tidal locking meaning spin–orbit synchronization, however as the system is still young, it is likely that the final state has not been reached yet. The current orbit places it within the brown dwarf desert.

The obliquity of the orbit of the brown dwarf with respect to the axis of rotation of the star has been measured by characterizing the Rossiter–McLaughlin effect. The measured value of projected obliquity is λ = 5°+11°
−10°, which, combined with inclinations of the orbit and the star's axis of rotation results in true obliquity of ψ = 14°+8°
−7°, meaning the system is aligned. As the system is younger than the timescale thought to be necessary for tidal interactions to align the orbit, this alignment is likely primordial.

The mass and radius of LP 261‑75 C are well-known from the radial velocity and transit photometry measurements. The obtained values of 67 M_{J} and 0.90 R_{J} can be compared to the theoretical isochrones, which predict how brown dwarfs cool, contract and dim through their lifetimes. The radius is smaller than expected for a brown dwarf with an age of approximately 100 Ma, corresponding more closely to the value expected for 1 Gyr for a given mass. As the young age of the system is otherwise well-established, this implies a gap in the current evolutionary models for the brown dwarfs.
