= Planet Patrol =

Planet Patrol may refer to:

- Planet Patrol (band), an American electro group founded in 1982.
- Planet Patrol (astronomy), A NASA citizen science project aimed at discovering exoplanets
- Planet Patrol (video game), a 1982 Atari 2600 video game by Spectravision
- Space Patrol (1962 TV Series), a British television series known as Planet Patrol in the United States
