= TOI-2119 =

Star system in the constellation Hercules

Observation data Epoch J2000 Equinox ICRS
- Constellation: Hercules
- Right ascension: 16^{h} 17^{m} 43.2055^{s}
- Declination: +26° 18′ 15.053″
- Apparent magnitude (V): 12.36

Characteristics
- Spectral type: M6?
- Variable type: eclipsing binary, flare star

Astrometry
| Radial velocity (R_{v}) | −17.015499±0.008277 km/s |
| Proper motion (μ) | RA: −29.265±0.021 mas/yr Dec.: 6.860±0.028 mas/yr |
| Parallax (π) | 31.7652±0.0259 mas |
| Distance | 102.68 ± 0.08 ly (31.48 ± 0.03 pc) |

Orbit
| Name | TOI-2119 b |
| Period (P) | 7.2008569±0.0000003 d |
| Semi-major axis (a) | 26.7±0.1 R_{★} |
| Eccentricity (e) | 0.3355±0.0002 |
| Inclination (i) | 88.47±0.02° |
| Argument of periastron (ω) (secondary) | −0.94±0.09° |
| Semi-amplitude (K_{1}) (primary) | 10.5841+7.7 −8.3 km/s |

Details

TOI-2119
| Mass | 0.525+0.020 −0.021 M_{☉} |
| Radius | 0.500±0.015 R_{☉} |
| Luminosity | 0.0397+0.0013 −0.0012 L_{☉} |
| Surface gravity (log g) | 4.763±0.018 cgs |
| Temperature | 3621+48 −46 K |
| Metallicity [Fe/H] | +0.055+0.084 −0.077 dex |
| Rotation | 13.11±1.41 d |
| Rotational velocity (v sin i) | 1.61±0.1 km/s |
| Age | 1.17±1.15 Gyr |

TOI-2119 b
| Mass | 64.4+2.3 −2.2 M_{Jup} |
| Radius | 1.08±0.03 R_{Jup} |
| Surface gravity (log g) | 5.132+0.028 −0.020 cgs |
| Temperature | 2030±84 K |

Other designations
- TOI-2119, TIC 236387002, GSC 02050-00184, 2MASS J16174320+2618151, Gaia DR2 1303675097215915264, Gaia DR3 1303675097215915264, StM 274, AP J16174320+2618151, 1RXS J161742.1+261820, UCAC-2 41034926, UCAC-4 582-052494
- b: TOI-2119.01

Database references
| SIMBAD | data |

TOI-2119 is a binary star system composed of a M-type main sequence star and a brown dwarf, discovered by the Transiting Exoplanet Survey Satellite (TESS) in 2020 and announced in 2022. It became the first example of a brown dwarf orbiting an M-dwarf to have the obliquity of the system measured using the Rossiter–McLaughlin effect.

The system is thought to be a field star, not belonging to any identified stellar association or moving group.

== Observational history ==
The eclipsing binary nature of the system was discovered in the TESS mission data of data sectors 24 and 25, recorded from April through June 2020. In addition to a transit signal with ~7.2-day period of transit depth δ = 0.04966±0.00030, the observed light curve also exhibited stellar flares and a ~13.1-day period brightness modulation which was identified with the rotation period of the star. In addition to the primary eclipse, where the brown dwarf passes in front of the primary star, a secondary eclipse with the brown dwarf passing behind is also visible with transit depth δ = 1053±88 ppm, which allowed for precise measurement of the orbital eccentricity as well as characterization of the brown dwarf's temperature by determination of its brightness relative to the primary.

To establish the alignment between the spin of the primary star and the brown dwarf's orbit, subsequent spectroscopic observations were performed using the NEID spectrograph at the WIYN Observatory during two transits on 10 May and 15 June 2023. The obtained spectroscopic data allowed for the characterization of Rossiter–McLaughlin effect. In addition, further observations by TESS in years 2022 and 2024 as well as ground observations were used to further refine the orbital solution.

== Physical properties ==
The system is composed of a primary red dwarf and with a companion brown dwarf in a close, eccentric orbit. This configuration makes the system interesting for investigation of tidal interaction models. The expected tidal circularization and inspiral time for the system, depending on the choice of the values for the tidal quality factor, are expected to be on the order of ~100 Gyr, much longer than the age of the system, implying that the system's primordial orbital configuration is largely preserved. By contrast, brown dwarfs in similar close-in orbits around larger, hotter stars are known to circularize soon after formation, making them unsuitable for studying the formation conditions.

Spectroscopic measurements of the Rossiter–McLaughlin effect during the transit have allowed also for the measurement of the system's spin-orbit obliquity, resulting in a value of projected obliquity λ = −0.8°±1.1°, which together with measurements of the inclination of the star's spin axis i_{★} = 72.9°+5.7°
−5.4° allowed for determination of three-dimensional obliquity of ψ = 15.7°+5.4°
−5.6°.

The primary star is a young, early M dwarf of roughly half solar mass. It exhibits flaring, with roughly two dozen flares of >0.5% over the baseline brightness detected over the initial 60-day observation window by TESS, implying moderate magnetic activity which explains UV excess detected in the spectrum.

The secondary companion is a brown dwarf with a mass of 64.4 M_{J} and a radius of 1.08 R_{J}. The effective temperature of the brown dwarf can be determined from the secondary transit depth to be 2030±84 K. The temperature is consistent with spectral type L, however as of 2024 the actual spectrum of the brown dwarf has not been resolved yet. This also means that it is not yet possible to determine whether the brown dwarf is metal-rich with no clouds, or cloudy with close to solar metallicity, same as the primary star.

== See also ==
- LP 261-75
