= TOI-700 =

Star in the constellation Dorado

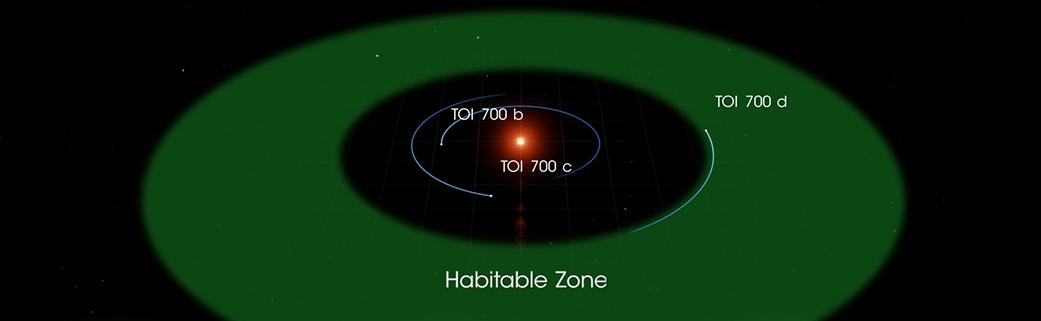
- TOI-700 planetary system (2020); Credit: NASA's Goddard Space Flight Center

Observation data Epoch J2000 Equinox ICRS
- Constellation: Dorado
- Right ascension: 06^{h} 28^{m} 22.97^{s}
- Declination: −65° 34′ 43.0″
- Apparent magnitude (V): 13.10±0.01

Characteristics
- Evolutionary stage: Main sequence
- Spectral type: M2V

Astrometry
Radial velocity (R_{v})	−4.4±0.1 km/s
Proper motion (μ)	RA: −102.750±0.051 mas/yr Dec.: 161.805±0.060 mas/yr
Parallax (π)	32.0980±0.0211 mas
Distance	101.61 ± 0.07 ly (31.15 ± 0.02 pc)

Details
Mass	0.416 ± 0.010 M_{☉}
Radius	0.420 ± 0.031 R_{☉}
Luminosity	0.0233 ± 0.0011 L_{☉}
Surface gravity (log g)	4.81 ± 0.06 cgs
Temperature	3480 ± 135 K
Metallicity [Fe/H]	−0.07 ± 0.11 dex
Rotation	54.0 ± 0.8 d
Age	>1.5 Gyr

Other designations
- TIC 150428135, UCAC3 49-21611, 2MASS J06282325-6534456, WISE J062823.05-653443.7, APASS 31812705, Gaia DR2 5284517766615492736

Database references
SIMBAD	data
Exoplanet Archive	data

TOI-700 is a red dwarf star in the constellation of Dorado, located 101.4 light-years (31.1 parsecs) away from Earth. The single planet TOI-700 d is the first Earth-sized exoplanet in the habitable zone of a star discovered by the Transiting Exoplanet Survey Satellite (TESS).

== Nomenclature and history ==
The acronym "TOI" refers to stars and exoplanets studied by TESS, and is short for: "Transiting Exoplanet Survey Satellite Object of Interest".

== Stellar characteristics ==
TOI-700 is a red dwarf of spectral class M (much redder, cooler, and dimmer than the sun) that is 40% the mass, 40% the radius and 55% of the temperature of the Sun. The star is bright with low levels of stellar activity. Over the 11 sectors observed with TESS, the star does not show a single white-light flare. The low rotation rate is also an indicator of low stellar activity.

== Planetary system ==
The TOI-700 planetary system
Companion (in order from star)	Mass	Semimajor axis (AU)	Orbital period (days)	Eccentricity	Inclination (°)	Radius
b	<0.74 M_{🜨}	0.0677±0.0011	9.977203^{+0.000019}_{−0.000016}	0.040+0.44 −0.025	89.61+0.27 −0.31	0.944+0.050 −0.049 R_{🜨}
c	2.50±0.34 M_{🜨}	0.0916+0.0055 −0.0057	16.0510951^{+0.0000075}_{−0.0000082}	0.041+0.041 −0.026	88.873+0.062 −0.083	2.65+0.14 −0.15 R_{🜨}
e	<1.16 M_{🜨}	0.1321+0.0079 −0.0082	27.80977^{+0.00018}_{−0.00017}	0.051+0.055 −0.033	89.60+0.15 −0.11	0.931±0.066 R_{🜨}
d	2.40+0.49 −0.52 M_{🜨}	0.1610+0.0097 −0.0099	37.42343^{+0.00021}_{−0.00013}	0.047+0.054 −0.030	89.82+0.12 −0.13	1.156+0.064 −0.063 R_{🜨}

Four exoplanets have been detected by TESS to be orbiting the host star TOI-700. All four exoplanets may be tidally locked to TOI-700.

Three papers describe the validation of the planetary system, the follow-up observations of TOI-700 d with the Spitzer Space Telescope and the characterization of TOI-700 d.

The composition of planets b and d is more likely rocky and the composition of planet c is more likely similar to that of Neptune.

The two inner planets might have grown faster and accreted significant gaseous envelopes, but the outer planet formed more slowly and accreted less gas. The innermost planet may later have lost its envelope due to photoevaporation. Another scenario that could explain the arrangement of densities in this system is long-term planetary migration. Planet c might have migrated inwards, but this scenario is more plausible if future studies show that planet c is significantly more massive than planet b or d.

=== Potentially habitable planets ===
==== TOI-700 d ====
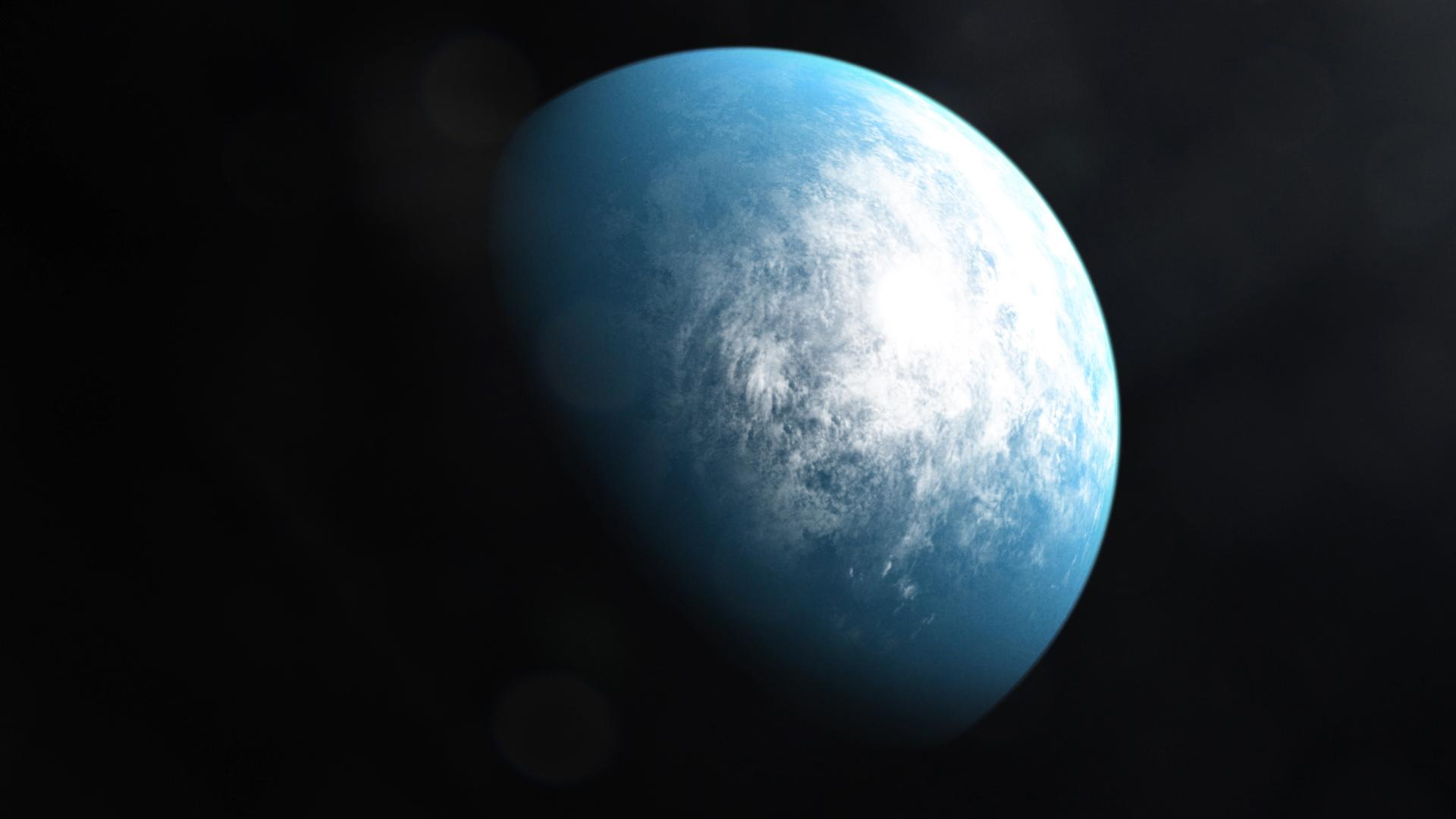
Artwork of exoplanet TOI-700 d

TOI-700 d lies in the habitable zone. It receives 35 times more EUV photons than Earth, but also 50 times less than TRAPPIST-1 e. The host star has low stellar activity. The atmosphere of a planet with an Earth-like pressure would survive for longer than 1 Gyr. Simulations of the planet have shown that TOI-700 d is a robust candidate for a habitable world. The simulated spectral feature depths from transmission spectra and the peak flux and variations from synthesized phase curves do not exceed 10 ppm. This will likely prohibit JWST from characterizing the atmosphere of TOI-700 d.

==== TOI-700 e ====
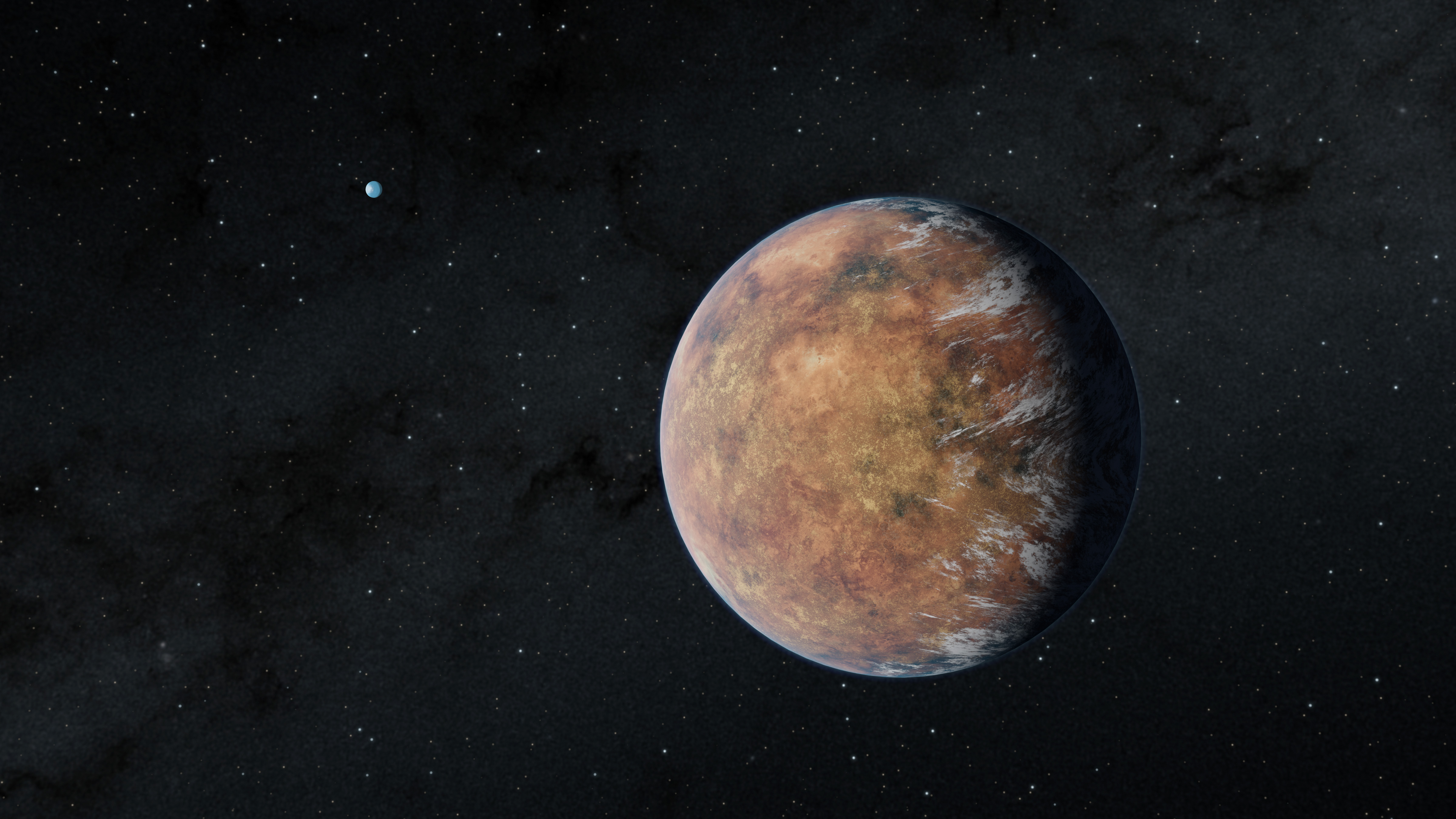
TOI-700 e concept art

In November 2021, a fourth possible planet, Earth-sized and receiving approximately 30% more flux from TOI-700 than Earth does from the Sun, was found at the inner edge of the habitable zone of TOI-700. In January 2023 the existence of this planet, designated 700 e, was confirmed.

Discovered in 2023, TOI-700 e is a terrestrial exoplanet that NASA claims to be an "earth-like" planet, with 95 percent of the Earth’s radius. Discovered by NASA's TESS (Transitioning Exoplanet Survey Satellite), TOI-700 e has a mass of about 0.818 Earths and takes 27.8 days to orbit once around its star. The planet is in a habitable zone distance from the M-type star TOI-700 it orbits, leading NASA scientists to believe that there is potential for liquid water on its surface. Ten percent smaller than its neighboring planet TOI-700 d, both are at a distance from their sun to be considered habitable, however, TESS requires an additional year to acquire more data about the exoplanets.

Being one in only about a dozen habitable zone planets known, further research and data collection of the TOI-700 solar system is important for understanding Earth-like planets.

=== Near orbital resonance ===
The system is near (but not in) orbital resonance: from planets b to d, period ratios are approximately 5:8, 4:7, 3:4.

TOI-700 multiplanetary system (video; 3:16)

== See also ==
- Kepler-62f
- Kepler-186f
- Kepler-442b
- LHS 1140 b
- List of potentially habitable exoplanets
- Proxima Centauri b
- TRAPPIST-1e
