= HD 202772 Ab =

Inflated hot Jupiter

Discovery
- Discovered by: TESS
- Discovery date: 2019
- Detection method: Transit

Orbital characteristics
- Semi-major axis: 0.05208 AU
- Eccentricity: 0.04
- Orbital period (sidereal): 3.3 d
- Star: HD 202772 A

Physical characteristics
- Mean radius: 1.545 R_{J}
- Mass: 1.017 M_{J}
- Temperature: 2,100 K (1,830 °C; 3,320 °F)

HD 202772 Ab is a hot Jupiter orbiting the brighter component of the visual binary star HD 202772, located in the constellation Capricornus at a distance of about 480 light-years from Earth. The discovery was announced on 5 October 2018. HD 202772 Ab orbits its host star once every 3.3 days. It is an inflated hot Jupiter, and a rare example of hot Jupiters around evolved stars. It is also one of the most strongly irradiated planets known, with an equilibrium temperature of 2,100 K (1,830 °C; 3,320 °F).
