= Exoplanet Explorers =

Citizen science project

Planetary transit

Exoplanet Explorers was a Zooniverse citizen science project aimed at discovering new exoplanets with Kepler data from the K2 mission. The project was launched in April 2017 and reached 26,281 registered volunteers. Two campaigns took place, the first one containing 148,061 images and the second one 56,794 images.

A total of 9 exoplanets were found through the project: K2-138 b, c, d, e, f and g (initially referred to as EE-1b, EE-1c, EE-1d, and EE-1e), K2-233 b, c, and d, and K2-288Bb. K2-288Bb is considered to be potentially habitable with a radius of 1.91 Earth radii and a temperature of 206 K.

Several other candidates in size groups were also found: Jupiters: 44, Neptunes: 72, super-Earths: 53, Earths: 15.

== See also ==
- Planet Hunters
- Planet Patrol
