= TOI-700 d =

Goldilocks terrestrial planet orbiting TOI-700

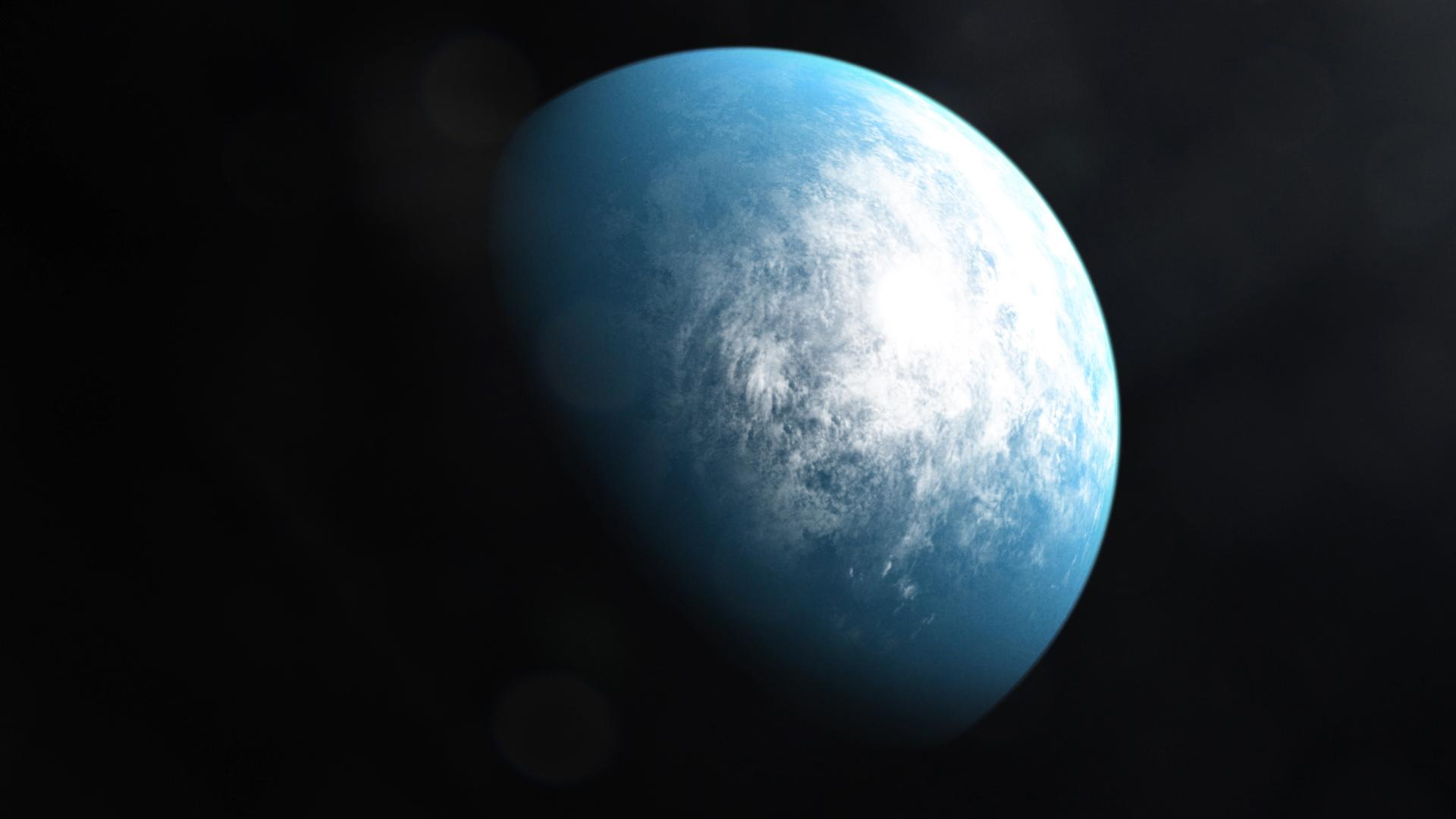
- Artistic simulation of TOI-700 d, depicted here as a possible ocean planet. The actual appearance of the planet is not currently known.

Discovery
- Discovered by: Emily Gilbert et al.
- Discovery date: 3 January 2020
- Detection method: Transit

Orbital characteristics
- Semi-major axis: 0.1610±0.0097 AU
- Eccentricity: 0.047+0.054 −0.030
- Orbital period (sidereal): 37.42343+0.00021 −0.00013 d
- Inclination: 89.82°+0.12° −0.13°
- Argument of perihelion: 10°+120° −140°
- Semi-amplitude: 0.83+0.16 −0.18 m/s
- Star: TOI-700

Physical characteristics
- Mean radius: 1.156+0.064 −0.063 R_{🜨}
- Mass: 2.40+0.49 −0.52 M_{🜨}
- Mean density: 8.47+2.45 −2.12 g/cm^{3}
- Surface gravity: 17.6+6.1 −5.2 m/s^{2}
- Escape velocity: 16.1+2.1 −2.2 km/s
- Temperature: 268.8+7.7 −7.6 K 268.8 K (−4.3 °C; 24.2 °F) (equilibrium)

TOI-700 d is a dense, rocky, near-Earth-sized exoplanet orbiting within the habitable zone of the red dwarf TOI-700. It is located roughly 101.4 light-years (31.1 pc) away from Earth in the constellation of Dorado and is the outermost of four confirmed exoplanets around its star. The exoplanet is the first Earth-sized exoplanet in the habitable zone discovered by the Transiting Exoplanet Survey Satellite (TESS).

TOI-700 d orbits its star at a distance of 0.161 AU (24,100,000 km; 15,000,000 mi) from its host star with an orbital period of roughly 37.4 days and has a radius of around 1.19 times that of Earth. It has been estimated that the planet receives about 88% the energy that the Earth receives from the Sun.

It was discovered on 3 January 2020 by the Transiting Exoplanet Survey Satellite (TESS).

== Physical characteristics ==
=== Mass, radius and temperature ===
TOI-700 d is slightly larger than Earth with a radius of about 1.16 R_{🜨}. However, it is significantly more massive at about 2.40 M_{🜨} with a density around 8.5 g/cm^{3}. The planet's high density indicates a rocky composition with a higher fraction of iron than Earth and may be explained by high-energy giant impact events during its formation.

The planet's equilibrium temperature would be about 268.8 K (−4.3 °C; 24.2 °F), and it receives 88% as much sunlight as Earth does from the Sun. The surface temperature of TOI-700d is likely higher if it has an atmosphere. A small chance of a runaway greenhouse effect exists.

=== Host star ===
TOI-700 is a red dwarf of spectral class M that is about 40% the mass and radius, and very roughly 50% of the temperature of the Sun. The star is bright with low levels of stellar activity. Over the 11 sectors observed with TESS, the star does not show a single white-light flare. The low rotation rate is also an indicator of low stellar activity.

=== Orbit ===
TOI-700 d orbits its host star with an orbital period of 37.42 days. It has an orbital radius of about 0.161 AU (24.1 million km; 15.0 million mi), less than half of that of Mercury to the Sun in the Solar System. It receives about 88% of Earth's sunlight from its host star.

== Habitability ==
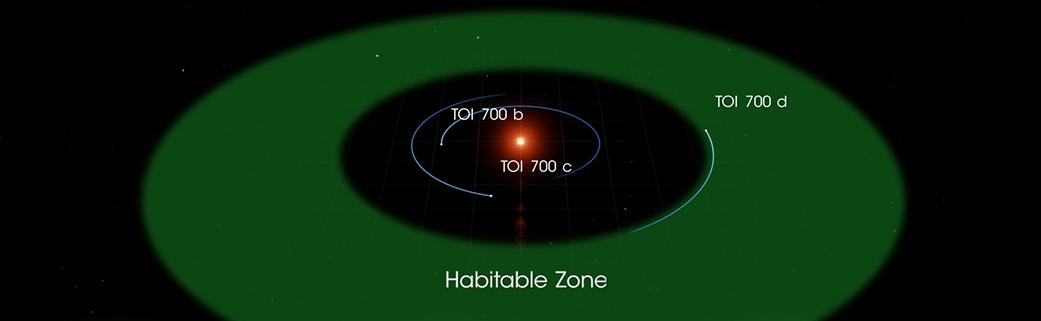
Simulation of the planetary system of TOI-700 (center) and its habitable zone, with planet d orbiting within the inner edge.

TOI-700 d orbits in the habitable zone of its host star. The solar wind ram pressure and intensity of the interplanetary magnetic field are expected to be similar to the Earth's, therefore retention of the planetary atmosphere is likely. The presence of an extended hydrogen/helium envelope on TOI-700c indicates the star's high energy emission was insufficient to strip its atmosphere. Therefore, TOI-700d, which receives less than half the insolation as c, may have been able to maintain a secondary high mean molecular weight atmosphere even less susceptible to photoevaporation.

== History and discovery ==
TOI-700 d was discovered by a team of astronomers led by Emily Gilbert using the Transiting Exoplanet Survey Satellite (TESS) in early January 2020. This was the first Earth-sized exoplanet in the habitable zone discovered by TESS.

TOI-700 multiplanetary system (video; 3:16)

== See also ==
- Kepler-62f
- Kepler-186f
- Kepler-442b
- LHS 1140 b
- List of potentially habitable exoplanets
- Proxima Centauri b
- TRAPPIST-1 e
