= Planet Patrol (astronomy) =

NASA science project

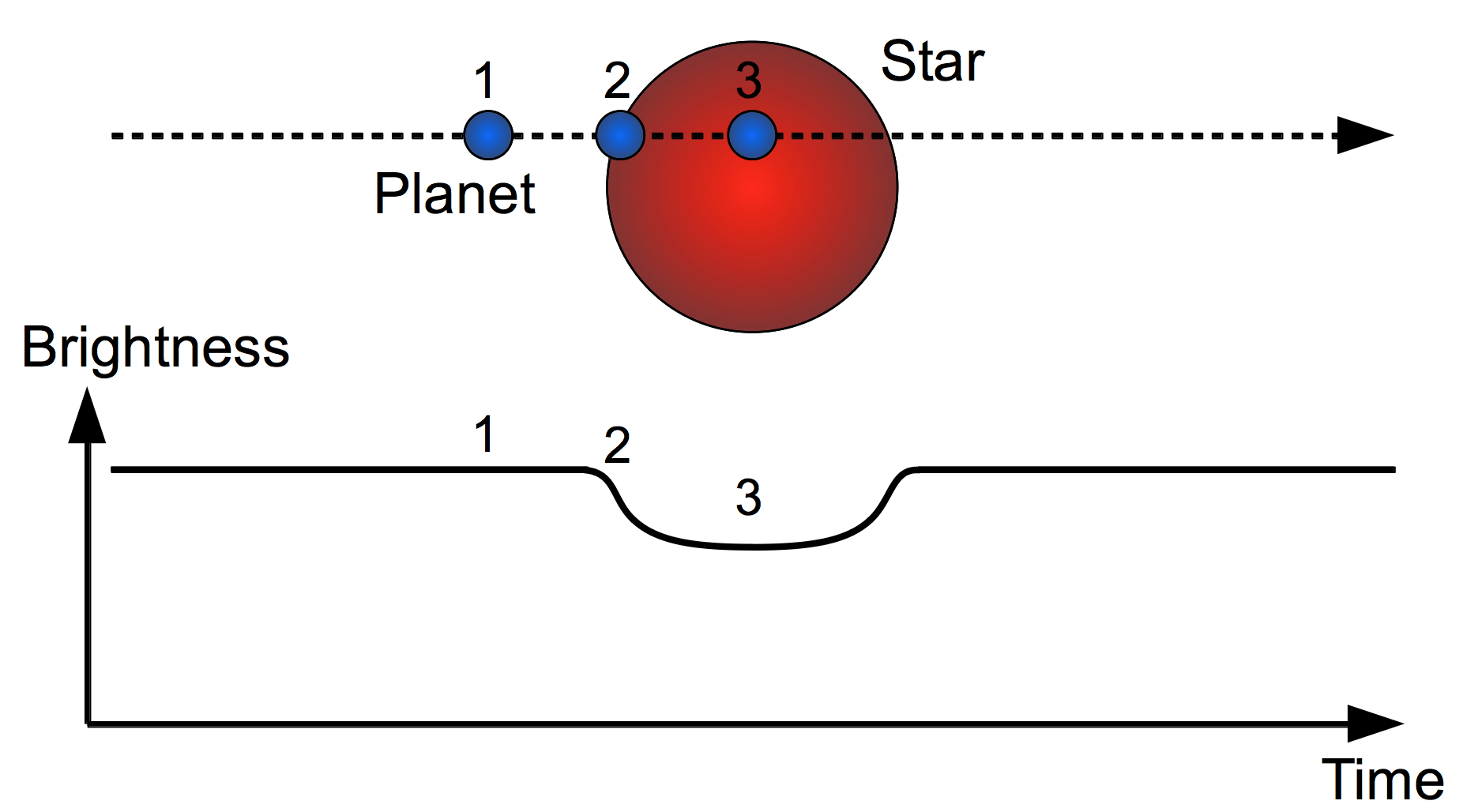
Exoplanet transit detection

Planet Patrol is a NASA citizen science project available in Zooniverse and aimed at discovering new exoplanets with data from the TESS telescope.

The project is built on results produced by a computer algorithm. The algorithm measures the center-of-light of the images and automatically compares it to the catalog position of the corresponding star.

The main difference with Planet Hunters is that Planet Patrol looks at objects that represent a detected planet candidate in TESS data, whereas Planet Hunters searches through all the stars in the TESS databases and asks humans to find such candidates.

As of September 2020, there were 1370 volunteers and 72,938 classifications have been done.

The images representing a possible exoplanet transit show a single bright source near the middle of the image with a dot at the center.

== Results ==
Two papers were published by Planet Patrol, vetting 1998 TESS Objects of Interest (TOIs). Of these TOIs 1461 passed as planet candidates, 286 were ruled out as false-positive and 251 were labelled as potential false-positives. The resulting catalog is named TESS Triple 9 (TT9), named after the number of vetted TOIs in each paper being 999.

The second TT9 paper describes interesting planet candidates, such as TIC 396720998.01 (TOI 709.01), a sub-Jovian around a hot subdwarf, named LB 1721. The planet candidate produces a V-shaped transit, which is different from the U-shaped transits that most planets produce. TOI 709.01 was previously classified as a false-positive by TRICERATOPS, another vetting tool. Because this tool uses pre-existing knowledge of its host star and transit shape, this tool might have been confused by the small size of the host star and the resulting V-shape of a transit. TOI 709.01 would be the second transiting planet around a degenerate star if confirmed. The first transiting planet around a white dwarf was WD 1856+534 b.

The paper also describes two planet candidates in the habitable zone: TOI 715.01 and the already confirmed TOI 1227 b.

== See also ==
- Planet Hunters
- Exoplanet Explorers
