= Transiting Exoplanet Survey Satellite =

NASA satellite of the Explorer program

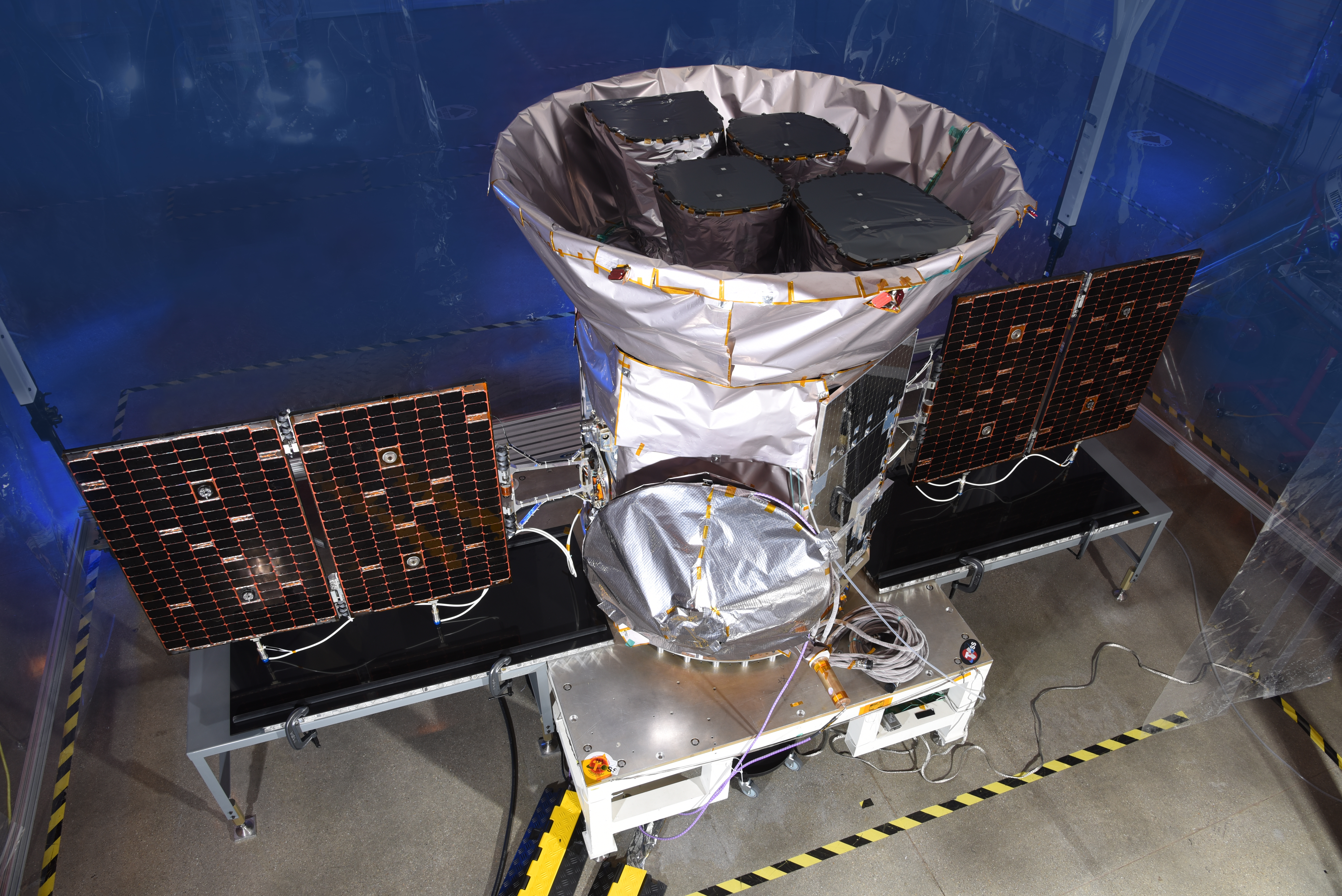
- TESS satellite
- Names: Explorer 95; TESS; MIDEX-7
- Mission type: Space observatory
- Operator: NASA / MIT
- COSPAR ID: 2018-038A
- SATCAT no.: 43435
- Website: tess.gsfc.nasa.gov tess.mit.edu
- Mission duration: 2 years (planned); 8 years, 7 months, 1 day (in progress)

Spacecraft properties
- Spacecraft: Explorer XCV
- Spacecraft type: Transiting Exoplanet Survey Satellite
- Bus: LEOStar-2/750
- Manufacturer: Orbital ATK
- Launch mass: 362 kg (798 lb)
- Dimensions: 3.7 × 1.2 × 1.5 m (12.1 × 3.9 × 4.9 ft)
- Power: 530 watts

Start of mission
- Launch date: 18 April 2018, 22:51:30 UTC
- Rocket: Falcon 9 Block 4 B1045-1
- Launch site: Cape Canaveral, SLC-40
- Contractor: SpaceX
- Entered service: 25 July 2018

Orbital parameters
- Reference system: Geocentric orbit
- Regime: Highly elliptical orbit
- Perigee altitude: 108,000 km (67,000 mi)
- Apogee altitude: 375,000 km (233,000 mi)
- Inclination: 5.145°
- Period: 27.322 days
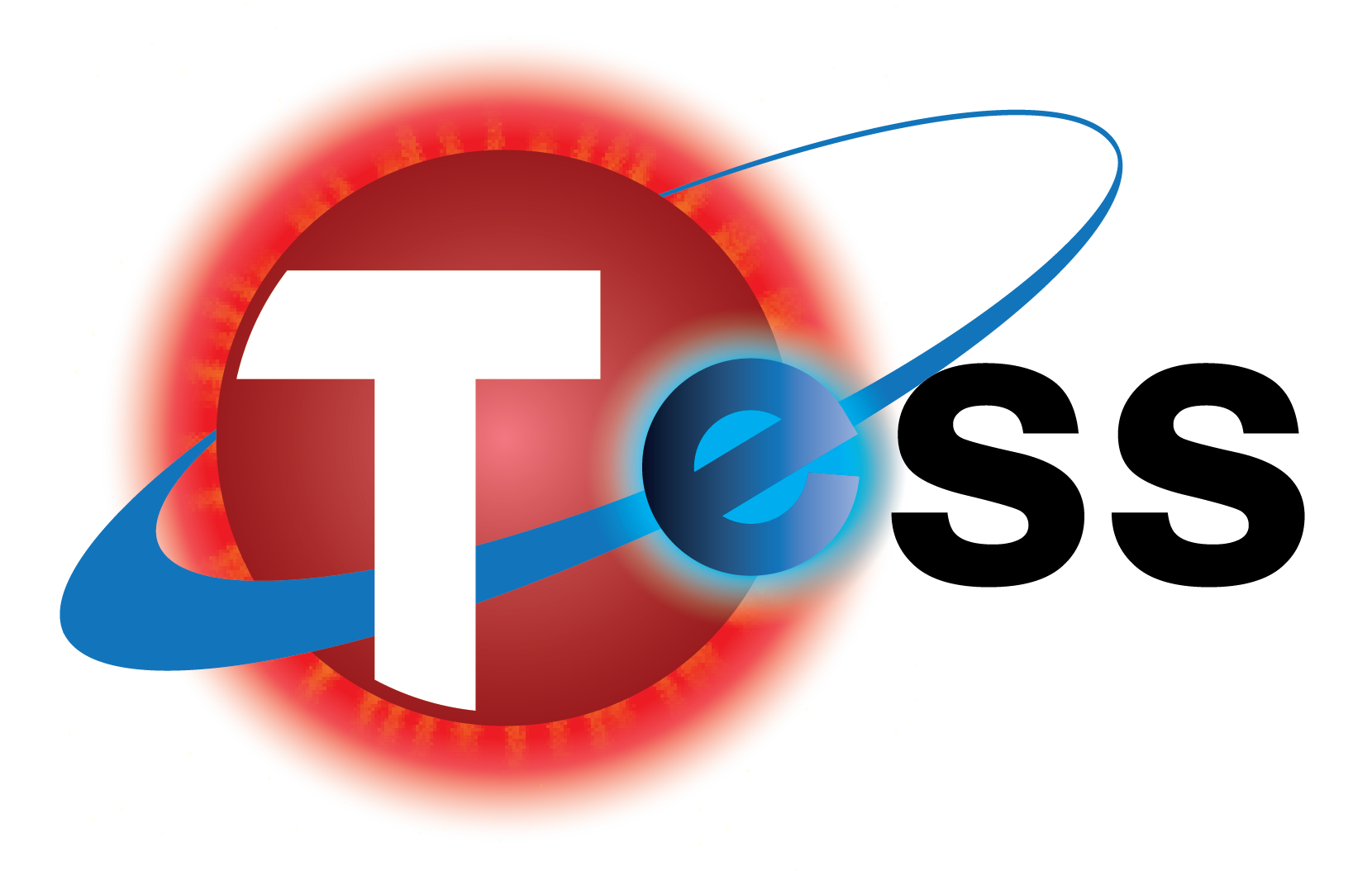
- TESS satellite mission patch Explorer program

The Transiting Exoplanet Survey Satellite (TESS) is a space telescope for NASA's Explorer program, designed to search for exoplanets using the transit method in an area 400 times larger than that covered by the Kepler mission. It was launched on 18 April 2018, atop a Falcon 9 launch vehicle and was placed into a highly elliptical 13.70-day orbit around the Earth. The first light image from TESS was taken on 7 August 2018, and released publicly on 17 September 2018.

In the two-year primary mission, TESS was expected to detect about 1,250 transiting exoplanets orbiting the targeted stars, and an additional 13,000 orbiting stars not targeted but observed. After the end of the primary mission around 4 July 2020, scientists continued to search its data for more planets, while the extended missions acquire additional data. As of 14 October 2026, TESS had identified 8,148 candidate exoplanets, of which 1,008 had been confirmed.

The primary mission objective for TESS was to survey the brightest stars near the Earth for transiting exoplanets over a two-year period. The TESS satellite uses an array of wide-field cameras to perform a survey of 85% of the sky. With TESS, it is possible to study the mass, size, density and orbit of a large cohort of small planets, including a sample of rocky planets in the habitable zones of their host stars. TESS provides prime targets for further characterization by the James Webb Space Telescope (JWST), as well as other large ground-based and space-based telescopes of the future. While previous sky surveys with ground-based telescopes have mainly detected giant exoplanets and the Kepler space telescope has mostly found planets around distant stars that are too faint for characterization, TESS finds many small planets around the nearest stars in the sky. TESS records the nearest and brightest main sequence stars hosting transiting exoplanets, which are the most favorable targets for detailed investigations. Detailed information about such planetary systems with hot Jupiters makes it possible to better understand the architecture of such systems.

The program is led by the Massachusetts Institute of Technology (MIT) with seed funding from Google. On 5 April 2013, it was announced that TESS, along with the Neutron Star Interior Composition Explorer (NICER), had been selected by NASA for launch. On 18 July 2019, after the first year of operation, the southern portion of the survey was completed, and the northern survey was started. The primary mission ended with the completion of the northern survey on 4 July 2020, which was followed by the first extended mission. The first extended mission concluded in September 2022 and the spacecraft entered its second extended mission which should last for another three years.

== History ==
The concept of TESS was first discussed in 2005 by the Massachusetts Institute of Technology (MIT) and the Smithsonian Astrophysical Observatory (SAO). The genesis of TESS was begun during 2006, when a design was developed from private funding by individuals, Google, and The Kavli Foundation. In 2008, MIT proposed that TESS become a full NASA mission and submitted it for the Small Explorer program at Goddard Space Flight Center, but it was not selected. It was resubmitted in 2010 as an Explorer program mission, and was approved in April 2013 as a Medium Explorer mission. TESS passed its critical design review (CDR) in 2015, allowing production of the satellite to begin. While Kepler had cost US$640 million at launch, TESS cost only US$200 million (plus US$87 million for launch). The mission will find exoplanets that periodically block part of the light from their host stars, events called transits. TESS will survey 200,000 of the brightest stars near the Sun to search for transiting exoplanets. TESS was launched on 18 April 2018, aboard a SpaceX Falcon 9 launch vehicle.

In July 2019, an Extended Mission 2020 to 2022 was approved. On 3 January 2020, NASA reported that TESS had discovered its first potentially habitable Earth-sized planet, TOI-700 d. On the week of 8 October 2026, TESS crossed the one-thousand confirmed exoplanets milestone.

== Mission overview ==
TESS is designed to carry out the first spaceborne all-sky transiting exoplanet survey. It is equipped with four wide-angle telescopes and associated charge-coupled device (CCD) detectors. Science data are transmitted to Earth every two weeks. Full-frame images with an effective exposure time of two hours are transmitted as well, enabling scientists to search for unexpected transient phenomena, such as the optical counterparts to gamma-ray bursts. TESS also hosts a Guest Investigator program, allowing scientists from other organizations to use TESS for their own research. The resources allocated to Guest programs allow an additional 20,000 celestial bodies to be observed.

TESS - Southern Sky panorama (video (3:30); 18 July 2019)

=== Orbital dynamics ===
TESS uses a novel highly elliptical orbit around the Earth with an apogee approximately at the distance of the Moon and a perigee of 108,000 km (67,000 mi). TESS orbits Earth twice during the time the Moon orbits once, a 2:1 resonance with the Moon. The orbit is expected to remain stable for a minimum of ten years.

In order to obtain unobstructed imagery of both the northern and southern hemispheres of the sky, TESS utilizes a 2:1 lunar resonant orbit called P/2, an orbit that has never been used before (although Interstellar Boundary Explorer (IBEX) uses a similar P/3 orbit). The highly elliptical orbit has a 375,000 km (233,000 mi) apogee, timed to be positioned approximately 90° away from the position of the Moon to minimize its destabilizing effect. This orbit should remain stable for decades and will keep TESS's cameras in a stable temperature range. The orbit is entirely outside the Van Allen belts to avoid radiation damage to TESS, and most of the orbit is spent far outside the belts. Every 13.70 days at its perigee of 108,000 km (67,000 mi), TESS transmits the data it collected during its most recent orbit back to earth via its downlink. This transmission occurs over a period of approximately three hours.

=== Science objectives ===
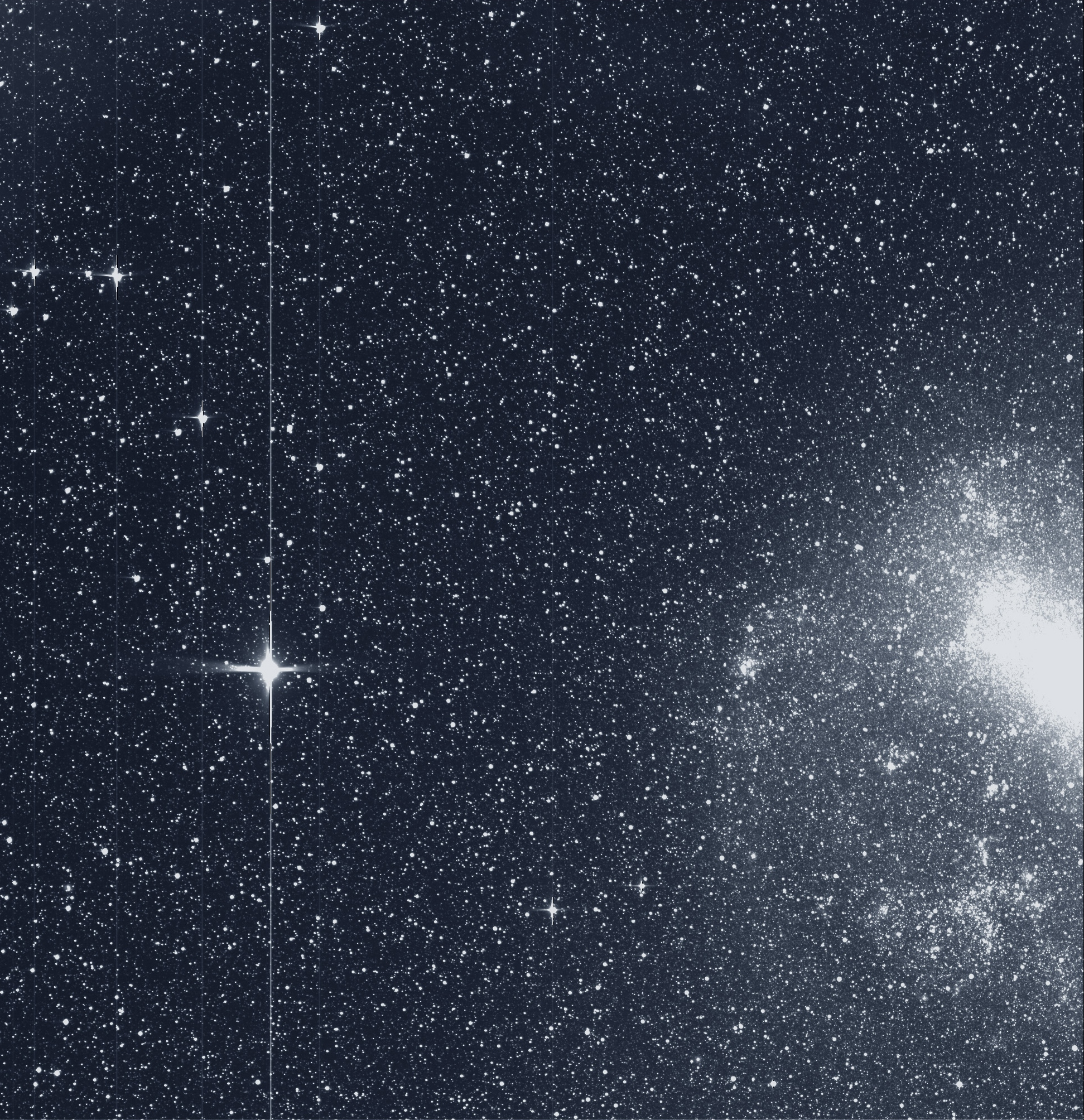
TESS – first light (7 August 2018)

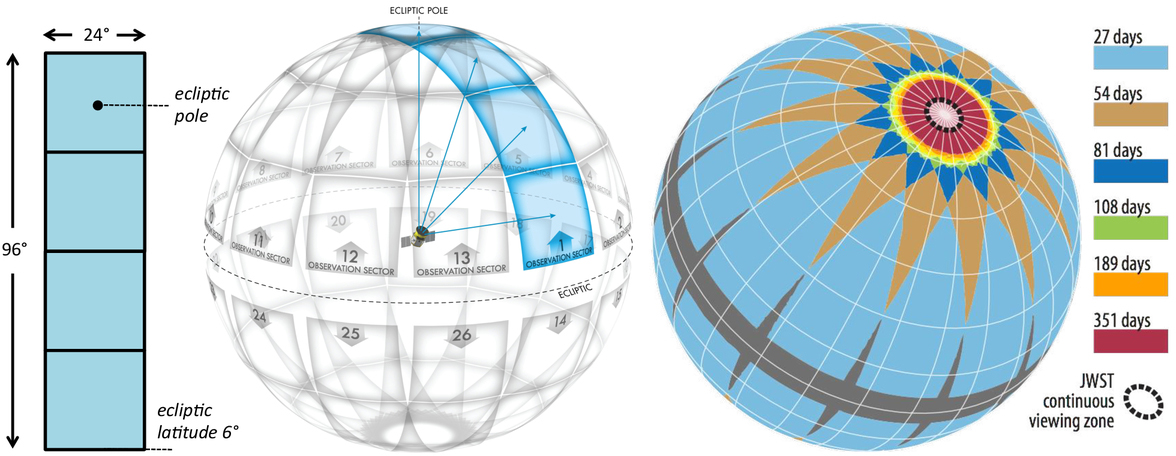
The 26 observation sectors of the sky planned for TESS

TESS's two-year all-sky survey would focus on nearby G-, K-, and M-type stars with apparent magnitudes brighter than magnitude 12. Approximately 500,000 stars were to be studied, including the 1,000 closest red dwarfs across the whole sky, an area 400 times larger than that covered by the Kepler mission. TESS was expected to find more than 3,000 transiting exoplanet candidates, including 500 Earth-sized planets and super-Earths. Of those discoveries, an estimated 20 were expected to be super-Earths located in the habitable zone around a star. The stated goal of the mission was to determine the masses of at least 50 Earth-sized planets (at most 4 times Earth radius). Most detected exoplanets are expected to be between 30 and 300 light-years away.

The survey was broken up into 26 observation sectors, each sector being 24° × 96°, with an overlap of sectors at the ecliptic poles to allow additional sensitivity toward smaller and longer-period exoplanets in that region of the celestial sphere. The spacecraft will spend two 13.70-day orbits observing each sector, mapping the southern hemisphere of sky in its first year of operation and the northern hemisphere in its second year. The cameras actually take images every 2 seconds, but all the raw images would represent much more data volume than can be stored or downlinked. To deal with this, cutouts around 15,000 selected stars (per orbit) will be coadded over a 2-minute period and saved on board for downlink, while full-frame images will also be coadded over a 30-minute period and saved for downlink. The actual data downlinks will occur every 13.70 days near perigee. This means that during the 2 years, TESS will continuously survey 85% of the sky for 27 days, with certain parts being surveyed across multiple runs. The survey methodology was designed such that the area that will be surveyed, essentially continuously, over an entire year (351 observation days) and makes up about 5% of the entire sky, will encompass the regions of sky (near the ecliptic poles) which will be observable at any time of year with the James Webb Space Telescope (JWST).

In October 2019, Breakthrough Listen started a collaboration with scientists from the TESS team to look for signs of advanced extraterrestrial life. Thousands of new planets found by TESS will be scanned for "technosignatures" by Breakthrough Listen partner facilities across the globe. Data from TESS monitoring of stars will also be searched for anomalies.

=== Asteroseismology ===
The TESS team also plans to use a 30-minute observation cadence for full-frame images, which has been noted for imposing a hard Nyquist limit that can be problematic for asteroseismology of stars. Asteroseismology is the science that studies the internal structure of stars by the interpretation of their frequency spectra. Different oscillation modes penetrate to different depths inside the star. The Kepler and PLATO observatories are also intended for asteroseismology.

=== Extended missions ===
During the 27 month First Extended Mission, July 2020 to Sept 2022, data collection was slightly changed:

- A new set of target stars will be selected
- The number of stars monitored at 2-minute cadence was increased from 15,000 to 20,000 per observing sector.
- Up to 1000 stars per sector will be monitored at a new fast 20-second cadence.
- The full-frame image cadence will be increased from every 30 minutes to every 10 minutes.
- The pointings and gaps in coverage will be slightly different during the extended mission.
- Regions near the ecliptic (omitted in the primary mission) will be covered.

During the 3 year Second Extended Mission, Sept 2022 to Nov 2025, the full-frame image cadence will be further increased from every 10 minutes to every 200 seconds, number of 2-minute cadence targets reduced to ~8000 per sector, and number of 20-second cadence targets increased to ~2000 per sector.

== Launch ==
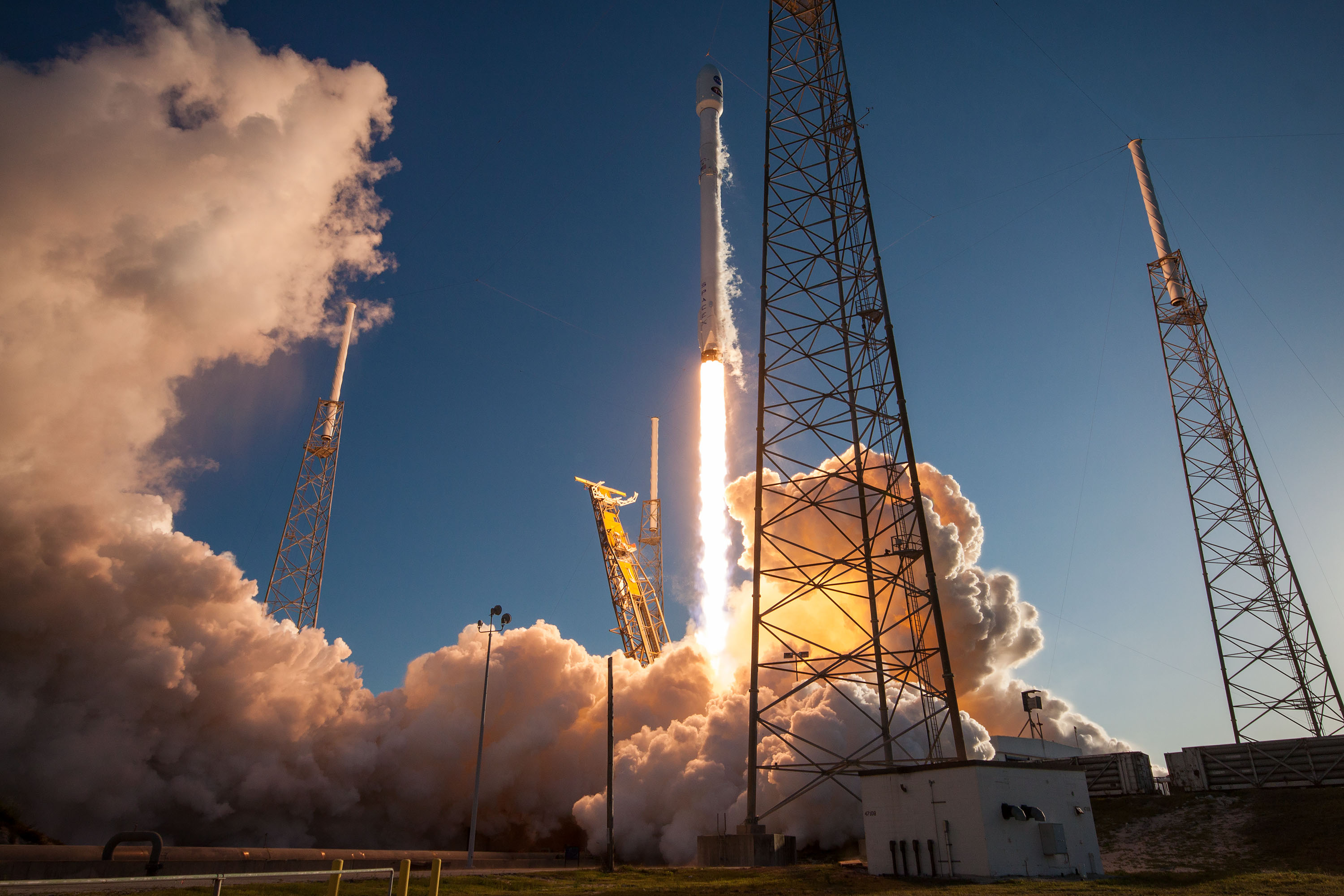
Falcon 9 launch vehicle carrying TESS, launching from Space Launch Complex 40 at Cape Canaveral in April 2018

In December 2014, SpaceX was awarded the contract to launch TESS in August 2017, for a total contract value of US$87 million. The 362 kg (798 lb) spacecraft was originally scheduled to launch on 20 March 2018, but this was pushed back by SpaceX to allow additional time to prepare the launch vehicle and meet NASA launch service requirements. A static fire of the Falcon 9 rocket was completed on 11 April 2018, at approximately 18:30 UTC. The launch was postponed again from 16 April 2018, and TESS was eventually launched on a SpaceX Falcon 9 launch vehicle from the SLC-40 launch site at Cape Canaveral Air Force Station (CCAFS) on 18 April 2018.

The Falcon 9 launch sequence included a 149-second burn by the first stage, followed by a 6-minute second stage burn. Meanwhile, the first-stage booster performed controlled-reentry maneuvers and successfully landed on the autonomous drone ship Of Course I Still Love You. An experimental water landing was performed for the fairing, as part of SpaceX's attempt to develop fairing reusability.

After coasting for 35 minutes, the second stage performed a final 54-second burn that placed TESS into a supersynchronous transfer orbit of 200 × 270,000 km (120 × 167,770 mi) at an inclination of 28.50°. The second stage released the payload, after which the stage itself was placed in a heliocentric orbit.

== Spacecraft ==
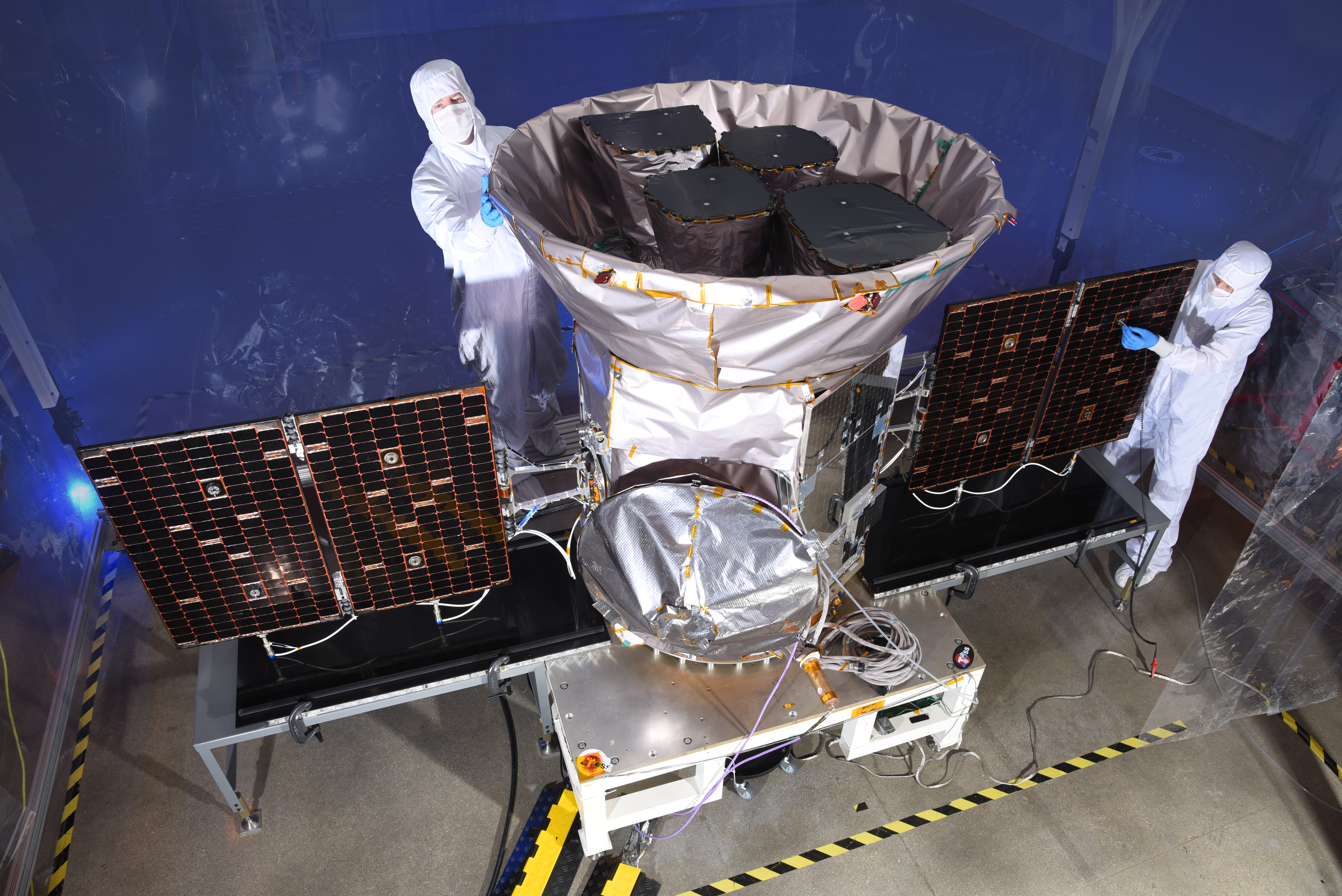
TESS spacecraft before launch

In 2013, Orbital Sciences Corporation received a four-year, US$75 million contract to build TESS for NASA. TESS uses an Orbital Sciences LEOStar-2 satellite bus, capable of three-axis stabilization using four hydrazine thrusters plus four reaction wheels providing better than three arcsecond fine spacecraft pointing control. Power is provided by two single-axis solar arrays generating 400 watts. A Ka-band dish antenna provides a 100 Mbit/s science downlink.

=== Operational orbit ===
Animation of Transiting Exoplanet Survey Satellite's trajectory from 18 April 2018 to 18 December 2019 Transiting Exoplanet Survey Satellite · Earth · Moon

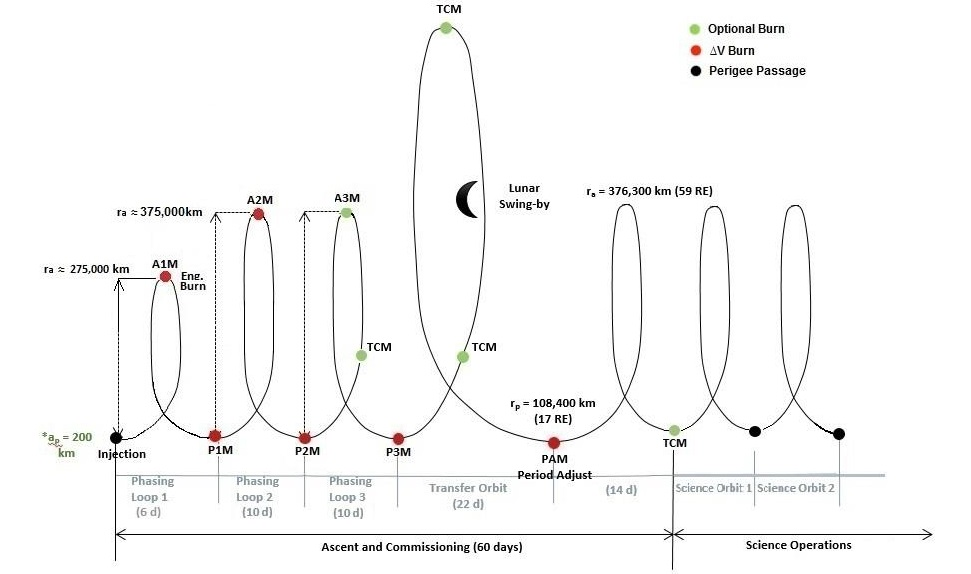
Planned orbital maneuvers after release from Falcon 9's second stage. Horizontal axis schematically represents longitude relative to the Moon, vertical axis is altitude. A1M = Apogee 1 manoeuvre, P1M = Perigee 1 manoeuvre, etc., TCM = trajectory correction manoeuvre (optional), PAM = period adjustment manoeuvre.

Once injected into the initial orbit by the Falcon 9 second stage, the spacecraft performed four additional independent burns that placed it into a lunar flyby orbit. On 17 May 2018, the spacecraft underwent a gravity assist by the Moon at 8,253.5 km (5,128.5 mi) above the surface, and performed the final period adjustment burn on 30 May 2018. It achieved an orbital period of 13.65 days in the desired 2:1 resonance with the Moon, at 90° phase offset to the Moon at apogee, which is expected to be a stable orbit for at least 20 years, thus requiring very little fuel to maintain. The entire maneuvering phase was expected to take a total of two months, and put the craft in an eccentric orbit (17–75 R_{🜨}) at a 37° inclination. The total delta-v budget for orbit maneuvers was 215 m/s (710 ft/s), which is 80% of the mission's total available reserves. If TESS receives an on-target or slightly above nominal orbit insertion by the Falcon 9, a theoretical mission duration in excess of 15 years would be possible from a consumables standpoint.

=== Project timeline ===
The first light image was made on 7 August 2018, and released publicly on 17 September 2018.

TESS completed its commissioning phase at the end of July and the science phase officially started on 25 July 2018.

For the first two years of operation TESS monitored both the southern (year 1) and northern (year 2) celestial hemispheres. During its nominal mission TESS tiles the sky in 26 separate segments, with a 27.4-day observing period per segment. The first southern survey was completed in July 2019. The first northern survey finished in July 2020.

A 27-month First Extended mission ran until September 2022. A second extended mission will run approximately additional three years.

== Instruments ==
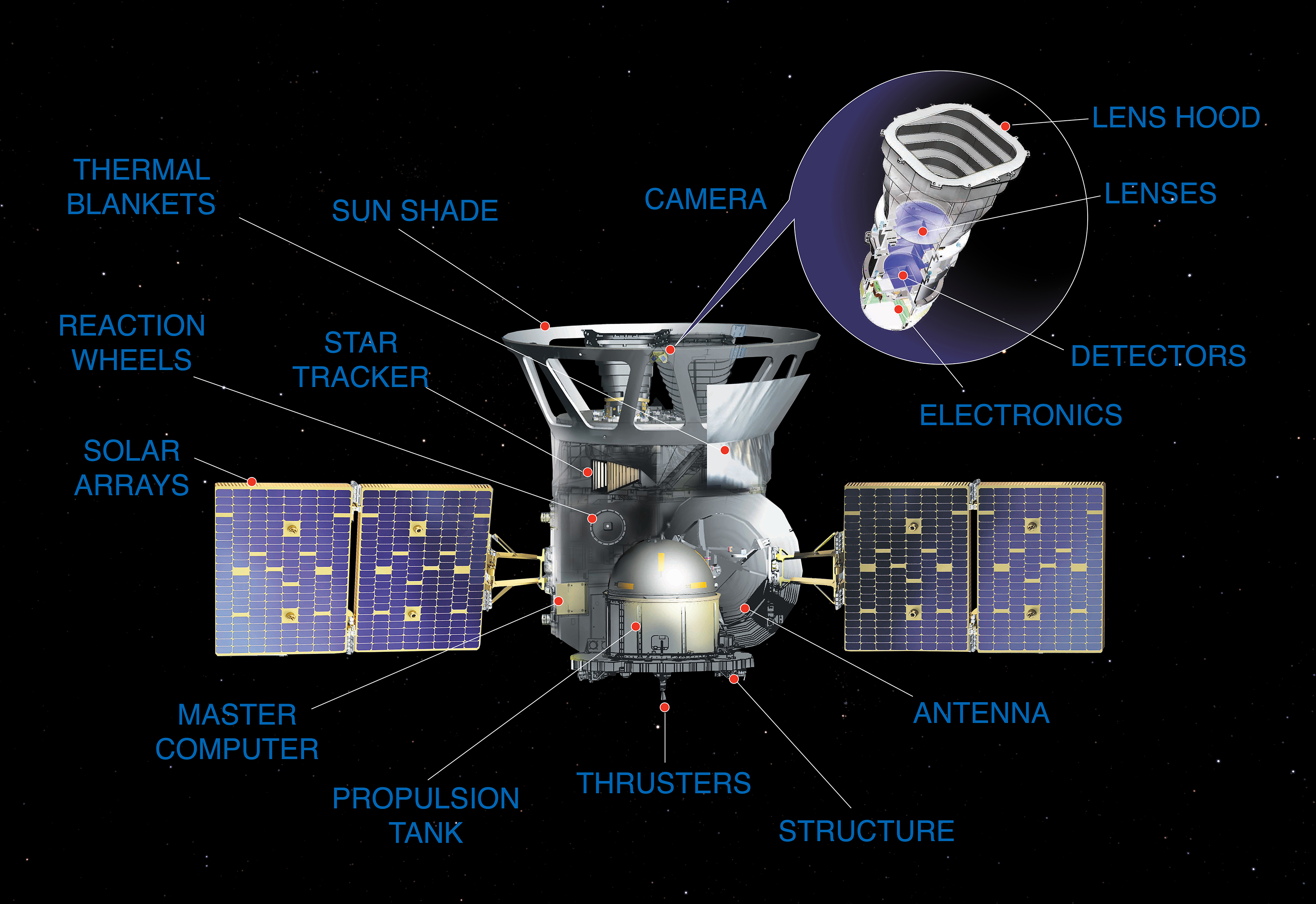
Instruments on TESS

The sole instrument on TESS is a package of four wide-field-of-view charge-coupled device (CCD) cameras. Each camera features four low-noise, low-power 4 megapixel CCDs created by MIT Lincoln Laboratory. The four CCDs are arranged in a 2 x 2 detector array for a total of 16 megapixels per camera and 16 CCDs for the entire instrument. Each camera has a 24° × 24° field of view, a 100 mm (3.9 in) effective pupil diameter, a lens assembly with seven optical elements, and a bandpass range of 600 nm (orange) to 1000 (NIR) nm. The TESS lenses have a combined field of view of 24° × 96° (2300 deg^{2}, around 5% of the entire sky) and a focal ratio of f/1.4. The ensquared energy, the fraction of the total energy of the point-spread function that is within a square of the given dimensions centered on the peak, is 50% within 15 × 15 μm and 90% within 60 × 60 μm. For comparison, Kepler's primary mission only covered an area of the sky measuring 105 deg^{2}, though the K2 extension has covered many such areas for shorter times.

The four telescopes in the assembly each have a 10.5-cm diameter lens entrance aperture, with a f/1.4 focal ratio, with a total of seven lenses in the optical train.

== Ground operations ==
The TESS ground system is divided between eight sites around the United States. These include Space Network and the Jet Propulsion Laboratory's NASA Deep Space Network for command and telemetry, Orbital ATK's Mission Operations Center, Massachusetts Institute of Technology's Payload Operations Center, the Ames Research Center's Science Processing Operations Center, The Goddard Space Flight Center's Flight Dynamics Facility, the Smithsonian Astrophysical Observatory's TESS Science Office, and the Mikulski Archive for Space Telescopes (MAST).

== Stable light source for tests ==
One of the issues facing the development of this type of instrument is having an ultra-stable light source to test on. In 2015, a group at the University of Geneva made a breakthrough in the development of a stable light source. While this instrument was created to support ESA's CHEOPS exoplanet observatory, one was also ordered by the TESS program. Although both observatories plan to look at bright nearby stars using the transit method, CHEOPS is focused on collecting more data on known exoplanets, including those found by TESS and other survey missions.

== Results ==
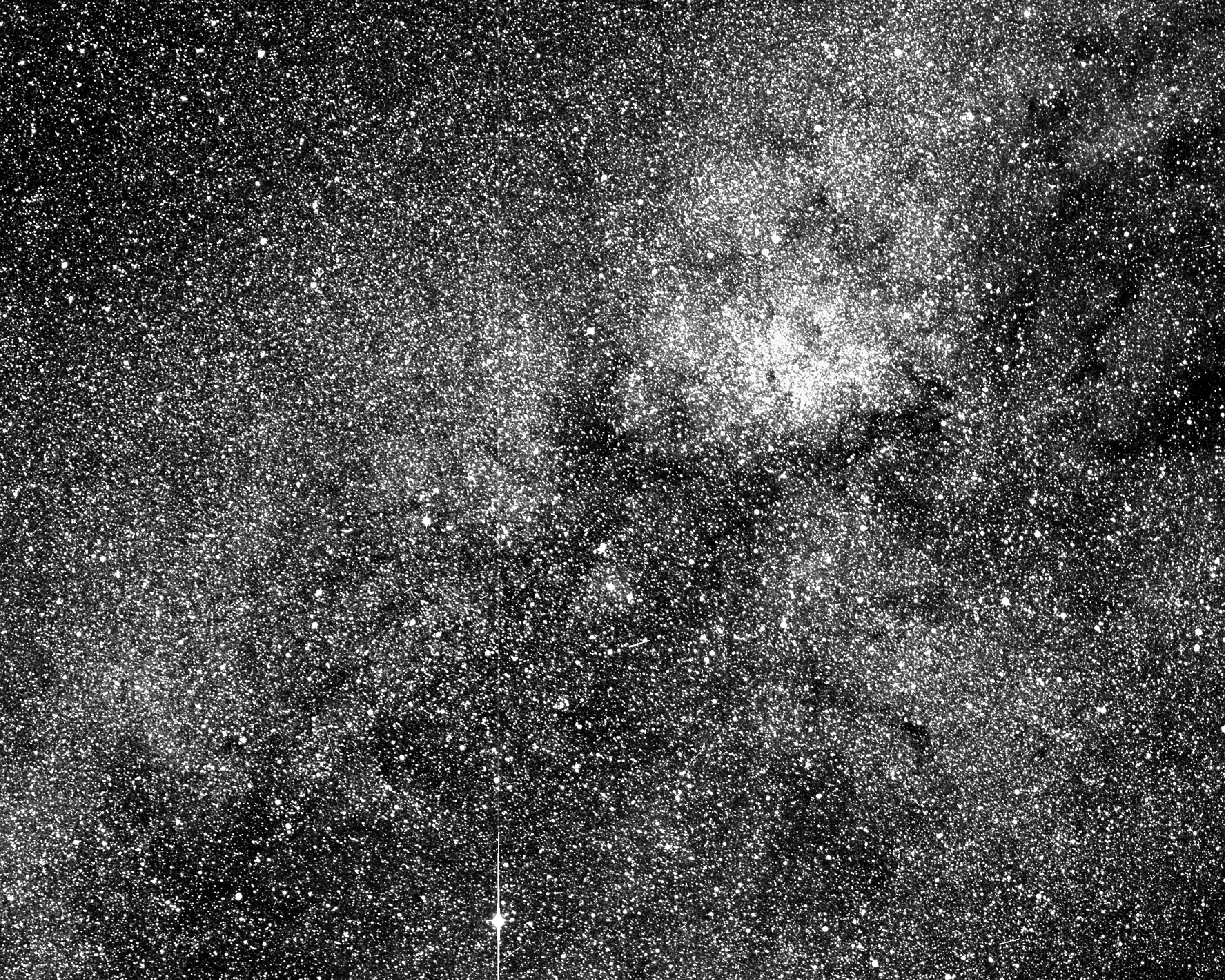
Test image taken before the start of science operations. The image is centered on the constellation Centaurus. In the top right corner the edge of the Coalsack Nebula can be seen. The bright star in the bottom left is Beta Centauri.

Current mission results as of 08 October 2026: 1008 confirmed exoplanets discovered by TESS, with 8148 candidate-planets that are still awaiting confirmation or rejection as false positive by the scientific community. TESS team partners include the Massachusetts Institute of Technology, the Kavli Institute for Astrophysics and Space Research, NASA's Goddard Space Flight Center, MIT's Lincoln Laboratory, Orbital ATK, NASA's Ames Research Center, the Harvard-Smithsonian Center for Astrophysics, and the Space Telescope Science Institute.

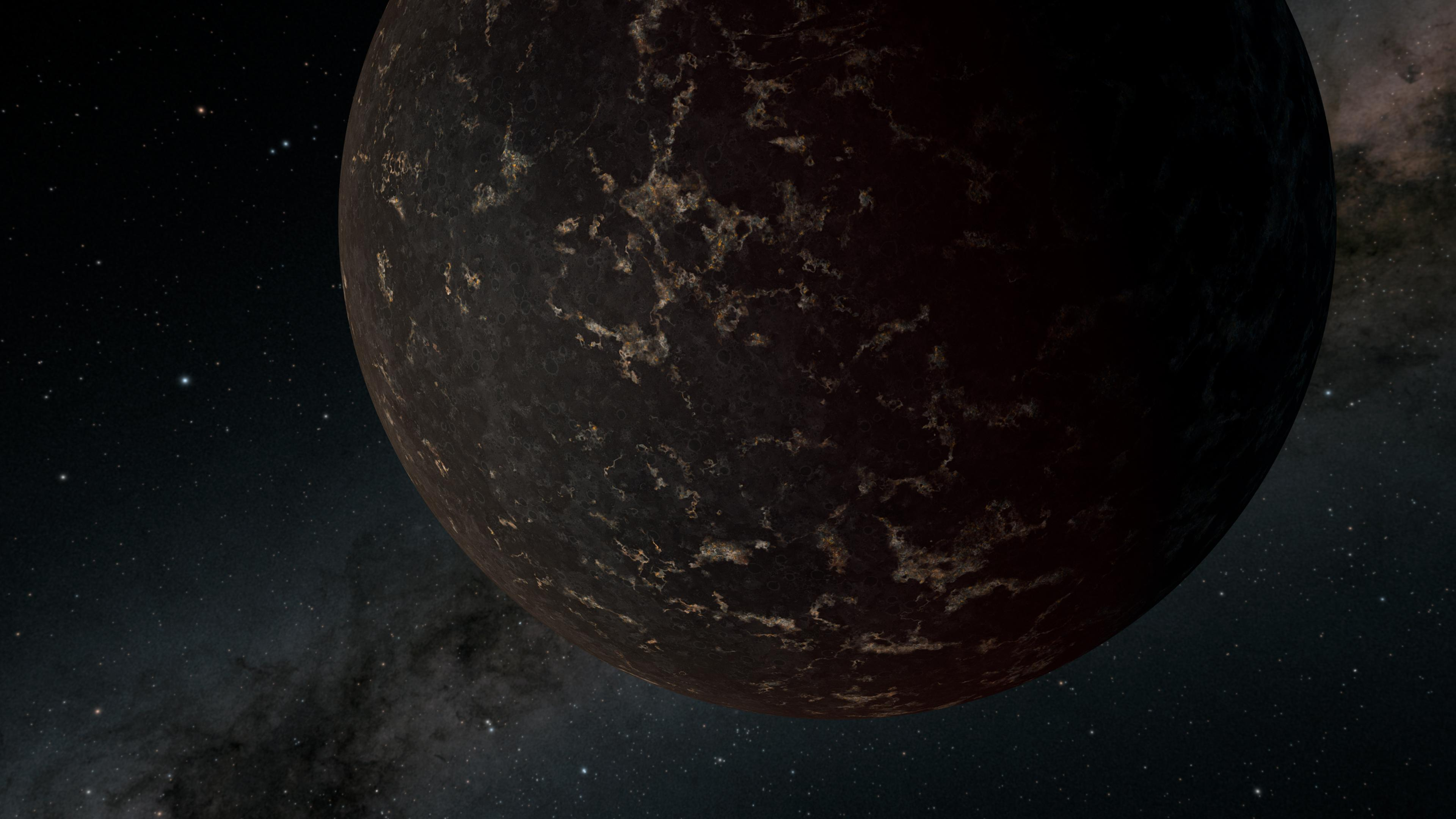
Exoplanet LHS 3844 b (artist concept)

=== C/2018 N1 ===
TESS started science operations on 25 July 2018. The first announced finding from the mission was the observation of comet C/2018 N1.

=== Pi Mensae ===
The first exoplanet detection announcement was on 18 September 2018, announcing the discovery of a super-Earth in the Pi Mensae system orbiting the star every 6 days, adding to a known Super-Jupiter orbiting the same star every 5.9 years.

=== LHS 3844 b ===
On 20 September 2018, the discovery of an ultra-short period planet was announced, slightly larger than Earth, orbiting the red dwarf LHS 3844. With an orbital period of 11 hours, LHS 3844 b is one of the planets with the shortest known period. It orbits its star at a distance of 932,000 km (579,000 mi). LHS 3844 b is also one of the closest known exoplanets to Earth, at a distance of 14.9 parsecs.

=== HD 202772 Ab ===
TESS's third discovered exoplanet is HD 202772 Ab, a hot Jupiter orbiting the brighter component of the visual binary star HD 202772, located in the constellation Capricornus at a distance of about 480 light-years from Earth. The discovery was announced on 5 October 2018. HD 202772 Ab orbits its host star once every 3.3 days. It is an inflated hot Jupiter, and a rare example of hot Jupiters around evolved stars. It is also one of the most strongly irradiated planets known, with an equilibrium temperature of 2,100 K (1,830 °C; 3,320 °F).

=== HD 21749 ===
On 15 April 2019, TESS' first discovery of an earth-sized planet was reported. HD 21749 c is a planet described as "likely rocky", with about 89% of Earth's diameter and orbits the K-type main sequence star HD 21749 in about 8 days. The planet's surface temperature is estimated to be as high as 427 °C. Both known planets in the system, HD 21749 b and HD 21749 c, were discovered by TESS. HD 21749 c represents the 10th confirmed planet discovery by TESS.

=== MAST Data collaboration ===
Data on exoplanet candidates continue to be made available at MAST. As of 20 April 2019, the total number of candidates on the list was up to 335. Besides candidates identified as previously discovered exoplanets, this list also includes ten newly discovered exoplanets, including the five mentioned above. Forty-four of the candidates from Sector 1 in this list were selected for follow-up observations by the TESS Follow-Up Program (TFOP), which aims to aid the discovery of 50 planets with a planetary radius of R < 4 R_{E} through repeated observations. The list of candidate exoplanets continues to grow as additional results are being published on the same MAST page.

=== Changing to the Northern Sky ===
On 18 July 2019, after the first year of operation the southern portion of the survey was completed, it turned its cameras to the Northern Sky. As of this time it has discovered 21 planets and has over 850 candidate exoplanets.

=== DS Tucanae Ab ===
On 23 July 2019, the discovery of the young exoplanet DS Tucanae Ab (HD 222259 Ab) in the ~45 Myr old Tucana-Horologium young moving group was published in a paper. TESS first observed the planet in November 2018 and it was confirmed in March 2019. The young planet is larger than Neptune, but smaller than Saturn. The system is bright enough to follow up with radial velocity and transmission spectroscopy. ESA's CHEOPS mission will observe the transits of the young exoplanet DS Tuc Ab. A team of scientists got 23.4 orbits approved in the first Announcement of Opportunity (AO-1) for the CHEOPS Guest Observers (GO) Programme to characterize the planet.

=== Gliese 357 ===
On 31 July 2019, the discovery of exoplanets around the M-type dwarf star Gliese 357 at a distance of 31 light years from Earth was announced. TESS directly observed the transit of GJ 357 b, a hot earth with an equilibrium temperature of around 250 °C. Follow-up ground observations and analyses of historic data lead to the discovery of GJ 357 c and GJ 357 d. While GJ 357 b and GJ 357 c are too close to the star to be habitable, GJ 357 d resides at the outer edge of the star's habitable zone and may possess habitable conditions if it has an atmosphere. With at least 6.1 M_{E} it is classified as a Super-Earth.

=== Count of exoplanets in 2019 ===
As of September 2019, over 1000 TESS Objects of Interest (ToI) have been listed in the public database, at least 29 of which are confirmed planets, about 20 of which within the stated goal of the mission of Earth-sized (<4 Earth radii).

=== ASASSN-19bt ===
On 26 September 2019, it was announced that TESS observed its first tidal disruption event (TDE), called ASASSN-19bt. The TESS data revealed that ASASSN-19bt began to brighten on 21 January 2019, ~8.3 days before the discovery by ASAS-SN.

=== TOI-700 ===
TOI-700 system

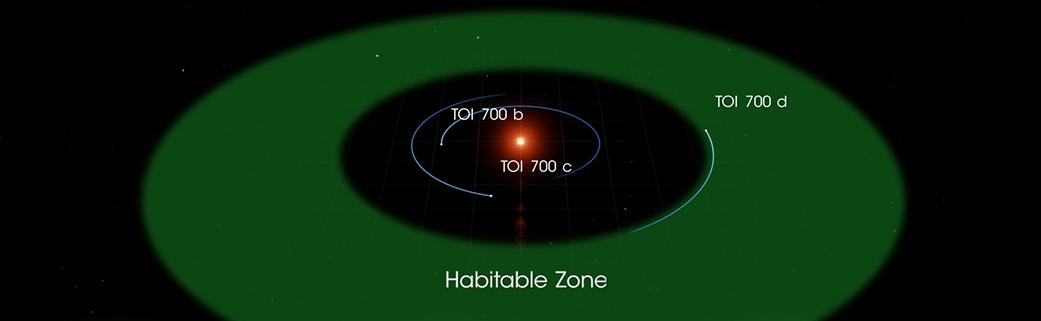
TOI-700 multiplanetary system

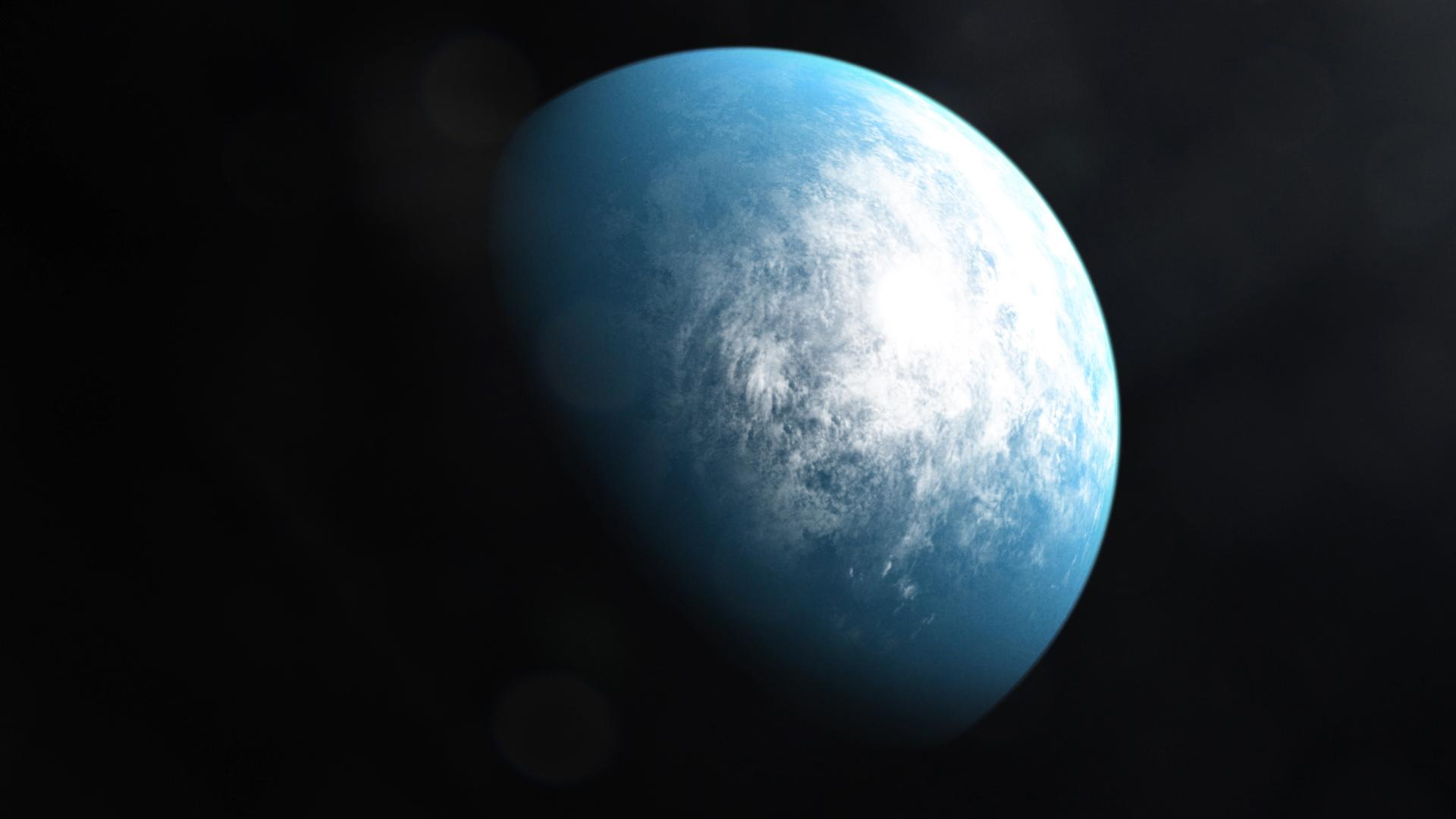
Exoplanet TOI-700 d (artist concept)

On 6 January 2020, NASA reported the discovery of TOI-700 d, the first Earth-sized exoplanet in the habitable zone discovered by the TESS. The exoplanet orbits the star TOI-700 100 light-years away in the constellation Dorado. The TOI-700 system contains two other planets: TOI-700 b, another Earth-sized planet, and TOI-700 c, a super-Earth. This system is unique in that the larger planet is found between the two smaller planets. It is currently unknown how this arrangement of planets came to be, whether these planets formed in this order or if the larger planet migrated to its current orbit. On the same day, NASA announced that astronomers used TESS data to show that Alpha Draconis is an eclipsing binary star.

=== TOI-1338 ===
NASA also announced the discovery of TOI-1338 b, the first circumbinary planet discovered by TESS. TOI-1338 b is around 6.9 times larger than Earth, or between the sizes of Neptune and Saturn. It lies in a system 1,300 light-years away in the constellation Pictor. The stars in the system make an eclipsing binary, which occurs when the stellar companions circle each other in our plane of view. One is about 10% more massive than the Sun, while the other is cooler, dimmer and only one-third the Sun's mass. TOI-1338 b's transits are irregular, between every 93 and 95 days, and vary in depth and duration thanks to the orbital motion of its stars. TESS only sees the transits crossing the larger star — the transits of the smaller star are too faint to detect. Although the planet transits irregularly, its orbit is stable for at least the next 10 million years.

=== HD 108236 ===
On 25 January 2021, a team led by astrochemist Tansu Daylan, with the help of two high school interns as part of the Science Research Mentoring Program at Harvard & MIT, discovered and validated four extrasolar planets — composed of one super-Earth and three sub-Neptunes - hosted by the bright, nearby, Sun-like star HD 108236. The two high schoolers, 18 year old Jasmine Wright of Bedford High School in Bedford, Massachusetts, and 16 year old Kartik Pinglé of Cambridge Ringe And Latin School, of Cambridge, Massachusetts, are reported to be the youngest individuals in history to discover a planet, let alone four.

=== TIC 168789840 ===
On 27 January 2021, several news agencies reported that a team using TESS had determined that TIC 168789840, a stellar system with six stars in three binary pairs was oriented so astronomers could observe the eclipses of all the stars. It is the first six star system of its kind.

=== Count of exoplanets in 2021 ===
In March 2021, NASA announced that TESS found 2200 exoplanet candidates. By the end of 2021, TESS had discovered over 5000 candidates.

=== TOI-1231 b ===
On 17 May 2021, an international team of scientists, including researchers from NASA's Jet Propulsion Laboratory and the University of New Mexico, reported, and confirmed by a ground based telescope, the space telescope's first discovery of a Neptune-sized exoplanet, TOI-1231 b, inside a habitable zone. The planet orbits a nearby red dwarf star, 90 light-years away in the constellation Vela.

=== Exoplanet search programs ===
The TESS Objects of Interest (TOI) are assigned by the TESS team and the Community TOIs (CTOI) are assigned by independent researchers. The primary mission of TESS produced 2241 TOIs. Other small and large collaborations of researchers try to confirm the TOIs and CTOIs, or try to find new CTOIs.

Some of the collaborations with names that are searching exclusively for TESS planets are:

- The citizen science project Planet Hunters: TESS (PHT)
- TESS Hunt for Young and Maturing Exoplanets (THYME)
- The TESS-Keck Survey (TKS)
- TESS Giants Transiting Giants (TESS GTG)

Collaborations with currently a smaller amount of discovery papers:

- Warm gIaNts with tEss collaboration (WINE)
- The TESS Grand Unified Hot Jupiter Survey

The TESS community is also producing software and programs to help validate the planet candidates, such as TRICERATOPS, DAVE, Lightkurve, Eleanor and Planet Patrol.

=== Stellar rotations ===
TESS can estimate stellar rotation rates (which correlate with age), to find populations of similar age stars that likely formed together.

== In popular culture ==
TESS is featured accurately in the 2018 film Clara.

== See also ==
- ARIEL, 2029 exoplanet atmospheres observatory
- CHEOPS, 2019 exoplanet observatory
- CoRoT, 2006–2012 exoplanet observatory
- Kepler, 2009–2018 exoplanet observatory
- MOST, 2003–2019 asteroseismology and exoplanet observatory
- PLATO, 2026 exoplanet observatory
- SWEEPS, 2006 Hubble Space Telescope exoplanet survey
- TOI-2119
- List of transiting exoplanets
